= 2009 Saitama Seibu Lions season =

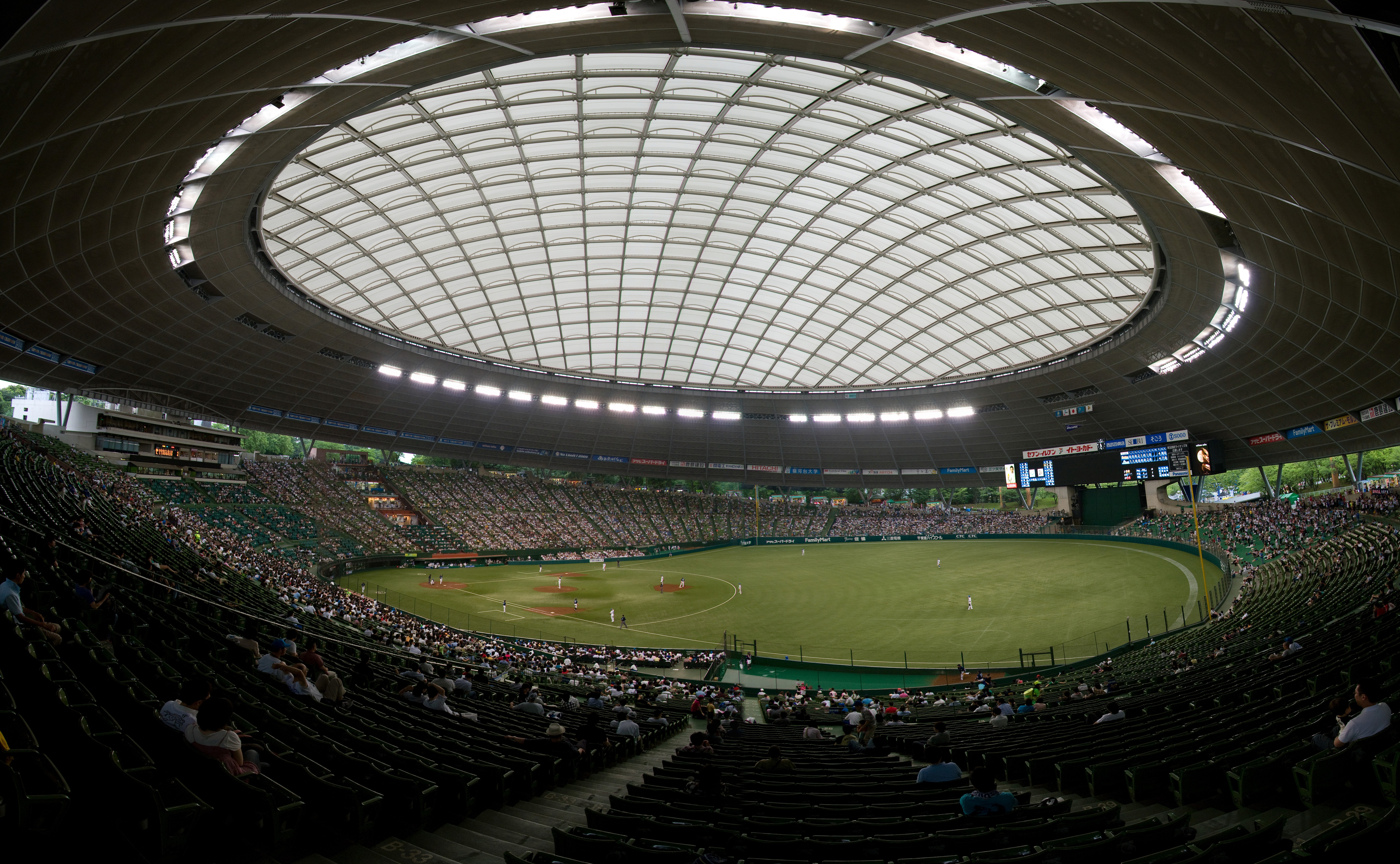
Seibu stadium

The 2009 Saitama Seibu Lions season features the Lions quest to win back-to-back Japan Series titles.

== Regular season ==
=== Standings ===
2009 Pacific League regular season standings
Pos	Team	Pld	W	L	T	GB	PCT	Home	Away
1	Hokkaido Nippon-Ham Fighters	144	82	60	2	—	.576	46–25–1	36–35–1
2	Tohoku Rakuten Golden Eagles	144	77	66	1	6.5	.538	39–32–1	38–34–0
3	Fukuoka SoftBank Hawks	144	74	65	5	3.5	.531	40–28–4	34–37–1
4	Saitama Seibu Lions	144	70	70	4	9	.500	38–32–2	32–38–2
5	Chiba Lotte Marines	144	62	77	5	15.5	.448	37–31–4	25–46–1
6	Orix Buffaloes	144	56	86	2	26	.396	32–40–0	24–46–2

=== Game log ===
2009 Game Log
April

#	Date	Opponent	Score	Win	Loss	Save	Attendance	Record
1	April 3	@Marines	2 - 5	Wakui (1-0)	Shimizu (0-1)	Graman (1)	30,041	1-0-0
2	April 4	@Marines	10 - 5	Komiyama (1-0)	Hoashi (0-1)		26,819	1-1-0
3	April 5	@Marines	6 - 5	Sikorski (1-0)	Graman (0-1)		24,313	1-2-0
4	April 7	Buffaloes	8 - 3	Kishi (1-0)	Kaneko (0-1)		24,011	2-2-0
5	April 8	Buffaloes	2 - 10	Yamamoto (1-0)	Ishii (0-1)		10,001	2-3-0
6	April 9	Buffaloes	13 - 6	Nishiguchi (1-0)	Hirano (0-1)		9,813	3-3-0
7	April 10	@Eagles	0 - 6	Wakui (2-0)	Iwakuma (1-1)		15,990	4-3-0
8	April 11	@Eagles	2 - 5	Onodera (1-0)	Hasebe (0-1)	Graman (2)	17,835	5-3-0
9	April 12	@Eagles	4 - 1	Rasner (1-0)	Wasdin (0-1)		17,477	5-4-0
10	April 14	@Hawks	3 - 5	Kishi (2-0)	Loe (0-2)	Graman (3)	14,451	6-4-0
11	April 15	@Hawks	2 - 2 (12)	Game tied after 12 innings			26,498	6-4-1
12	April 16	@Hawks	5 - 12	Nishiguchi (2-0)	Otonari (0-2)	Hirano (1)	25,538	7-4-1
13	April 17	Fighters	2 - 4	Darvish (2-1)	Wakui (2-1)	Takeda (2)	15,181	7-5-1
14	April 18	Fighters	4 - 6	Tanimoto (1-0)	Shotsu (0-1)	Takeda (3)	28,525	7-6-1
15	April 19	Fighters	6 - 8	Miyanishi (1-0)	Onodera (1-1)	Takeda (4)	22,315	7-7-1
16	April 21	@Buffaloes	1 - 7	Kishi (3-0)	Kaneko (1-2)		10,326	8-7-1
17	April 22	@Buffaloes	6 - 3	Yamamoto (2-0)	Ishii (0-2)		10,805	8-8-1
18	April 23	@Buffaloes	2 - 1	Kato (1-0)	Onuma (0-1)		10,586	8-9-1
19	April 24	Marines	3 - 1	Wakui (3-1)	Karakawa (1-2)		12,618	9-9-1
20	April 25	Marines	2 - 3	Naruse (1-0)	Hoashi (0-2)	Ogino (2)	23,147	9-10-1
21	April 26	Marines	5 - 11	Omine (1-0)	Wasdin (0-2)		23,647	9-11-1
22	April 28	Hawks	5 - 4	Kishi (4-0)	Loe (0-3)	Onodera (1)	16,151	10-11-1
23	April 29	Hawks	7 - 2	Ishii (1-2)	Houlton (2-1)		28,855	11-11-1
24	April 30	Hawks	5 - 8	Mizuta (1-0)	Doi (0-1)	Mahara (4)	15,720	11-12-1

May

#	Date	Opponent	Score	Win	Loss	Save	Attendance	Record
25	May 1	@Fighters	1 - 2 (12)	Onuma (1-1)	Tateyama (1-2)	Nogami (1)	28,007	12-12-1
26	May 2	@Fighters	7 - 6 (11)	Takeda (1-0)	Nogami (0-1)		34,711	12-13-1
27	May 3	@Fighters	6 - 5 (12)	Tanimoto (2-0)	Onodera (1-2)		40,754	12-14-1
28	May 4	Eagles	8 - 3	Kishi (5-0)	Kawai (0-2)		33,911	13-14-1
29	May 5	Eagles	3 - 7	Isaka (1-0)	Ishii (1-3)		33,908	13-15-1
30	May 6	Eagles	3 - 6	Hasebe (2-2)	Nishiguchi (2-1)		31,440	13-16-1
31	May 8	@Hawks	4 - 3	Settsu (1-2)	Graman (0-2)		29,611	13-17-1
32	May 9	@Hawks	1 - 9	Hoashi (1-2)	Arakaki (0-2)		30,863	14-17-1
33	May 10	@Hawks	8 - 1	Sugiuchi (4-1)	Nogami (0-2)		30,337	14-18-1
34	May 12	@Buffaloes	5 - 6	Kishi (6-0)	Kondo (3-2)	Onodera (2)	10,502	15-18-1
35	May 13	@Buffaloes	3 - 8	Ishii (2-3)	Yamamoto (2-2)		10,454	16-18-1
36	May 14	@Buffaloes	1 - 3	Nishiguchi (3-1)	Kaneko (3-3)	Onodera (3)	10,229	17-18-1
37	May 15	@Marines	0 - 18	Wakui (4-1)	Watanabe (1-4)		17,567	18-18-1
38	May 16	@Marines	6 - 4	Ito (2-1)	Onuma (1-2)	Ogino (5)	20,074	18-19-1
39	May 17	@Marines	8 - 5	Ono (2-3)	Hirano (0-1)	Ogino (6)	14,363	18-20-1
40	May 19	Dragons	5 - 7	Asakura (4-2)	Onuma (1-3)	Iwase (9)	18,110	18-21-1
41	May 20	Dragons	2 - 1 (10)	Nogami (1-2)	Asao (3-5)		19,203	19-21-1
42	May 22	BayStars	5 - 15	Miura (5-2)	Wakui (4-2)		16,323	19-22-1
43	May 23	BayStars	10 - 6	Hoashi (2-2)	Glynn (2-5)		24,471	20-22-1
44	May 24	@Carp	7 - 5	Komatsu (1-0)	Nishiguchi (3-2)	Nagakawa (12)	28,309	20-23-1
45	May 25	@Carp	3 - 0	Otake (4-1)	Kishi (6-1)	Nagakawa (13)	24,558	20-24-1
46	May 27	@Tigers	4 - 1	Shimoyanagi (4-2)	Ishii (2-4)	Fujikawa (4)	46,160	20-25-1
47	May 28	@Tigers	4 - 6	Wakui (5-2)	Ando (3-4)	Onodera (4)	44,395	21-25-1
48	May 30	Giants	2 - 2 (12)	Game tied after 12 innings			33,778	21-25-2
49	May 31	Giants	3 - 2 (10)	Onodera (2-2)	Kroon (0-1)		33,173	22-25-2

June

#	Date	Opponent	Score	Win	Loss	Save	Attendance	Record
50	June 2	Swallows	7 - 3	Wasdin (1-2)	Ishikawa (6-3)		16,001	23-25-2
51	June 3	Swallows						
52	June 5	@BayStars						
53	June 6	@BayStars						
54	June 7	@Dragons						
55	June 8	@Dragons						
56	June 10	Tigers						
57	June 11	Tigers						
58	June 13	Carp						
59	June 14	Carp						
60	June 16	@Giants						
61	June 17	@Giants						
62	June 20	@Swallows						
63	June 21	@Swallows						
64	June 26	Hawks						
65	June 27	Hawks						
66	June 28	Hawks						
67	June 30	Marines						

July

#	Date	Opponent	Score	Win	Loss	Save	Attendance	Record
68	July 1	Marines						
69	July 2	Marines						
70	July 3	@Eagles						
71	July 4	@Eagles						
72	July 5	@Eagles						
73	July 7	Fighters						
74	July 8	Fighters						
75	July 9	Fighters						
76	July 10	Buffaloes						
77	July 11	Buffaloes						
78	July 12	Buffaloes						
79	July 14	Eagles						
80	July 15	Eagles						
81	July 16	Eagles						
82	July 18	@Fighters						
83	July 19	@Fighters						
84	July 20	Buffaloes						
85	July 21	Buffaloes						
86	July 22	Buffaloes						
87	July 28	@Eagles						
88	July 29	@Eagles						
89	July 31	@Buffaloes						

August

#	Date	Opponent	Score	Win	Loss	Save	Attendance	Record
90	August 1	@Buffaloes						
91	August 2	@Buffaloes						
92	August 4	Fighters						
93	August 5	Fighters						
94	August 6	Fighters						
95	August 7	Hawks						
96	August 8	Hawks						
97	August 9	Hawks						
98	August 11	@Marines						
99	August 12	@Marines						
100	August 13	@Marines						
101	August 14	@Fighters						
102	August 15	@Fighters						
103	August 16	@Fighters						
104	August 18	@Hawks						
105	August 19	@Hawks						
106	August 20	@Hawks						
107	August 21	Marines						
108	August 22	Marines						
109	August 23	Marines						
110	August 25	Eagles						
111	August 26	Eagles						
112	August 27	Eagles						
113	August 28	@Buffaloes						
114	August 29	@Buffaloes						
115	August 30	@Buffaloes						

September

#	Date	Opponent	Score	Win	Loss	Save	Attendance	Record
116	September 1	@Eagles						
117	September 2	@Eagles						
118	September 3	@Eagles						
119	September 4	@Hawks						
120	September 5	@Hawks						
121	September 6	@Hawks						
122	September 8	Fighters						
123	September 9	Fighters						
124	September 10	Fighters						
125	September 11	Buffaloes						
126	September 12	Buffaloes						
127	September 13	Buffaloes						
128	September 15	@Marines						
129	September 16	@Marines						
130	September 17	@Marines						
131	September 18	Hawks						
132	September 19	Hawks						
133	September 20	Hawks						
134	September 21	@Fighters						
135	September 22	@Fighters						
136	September 23	@Fighters						
137	September 25	Eagles						
138	September 26	Eagles						
139	September 27	Eagles						
140	September 29	Marines						
141	September 30	Marines						

October

#	Date	Opponent	Score	Win	Loss	Save	Attendance	Record
142	October 1	Marines						
143	October 3	@Eagles						
144	October 5	@Fighters						

== Player stats ==
=== Batting ===
Player	G	AB	H	Avg.	HR	RBI	SB

=== Pitching ===
Player	G	GS	IP	W	L	SV	ERA	SO
