= 2009 Chiba Lotte Marines season =

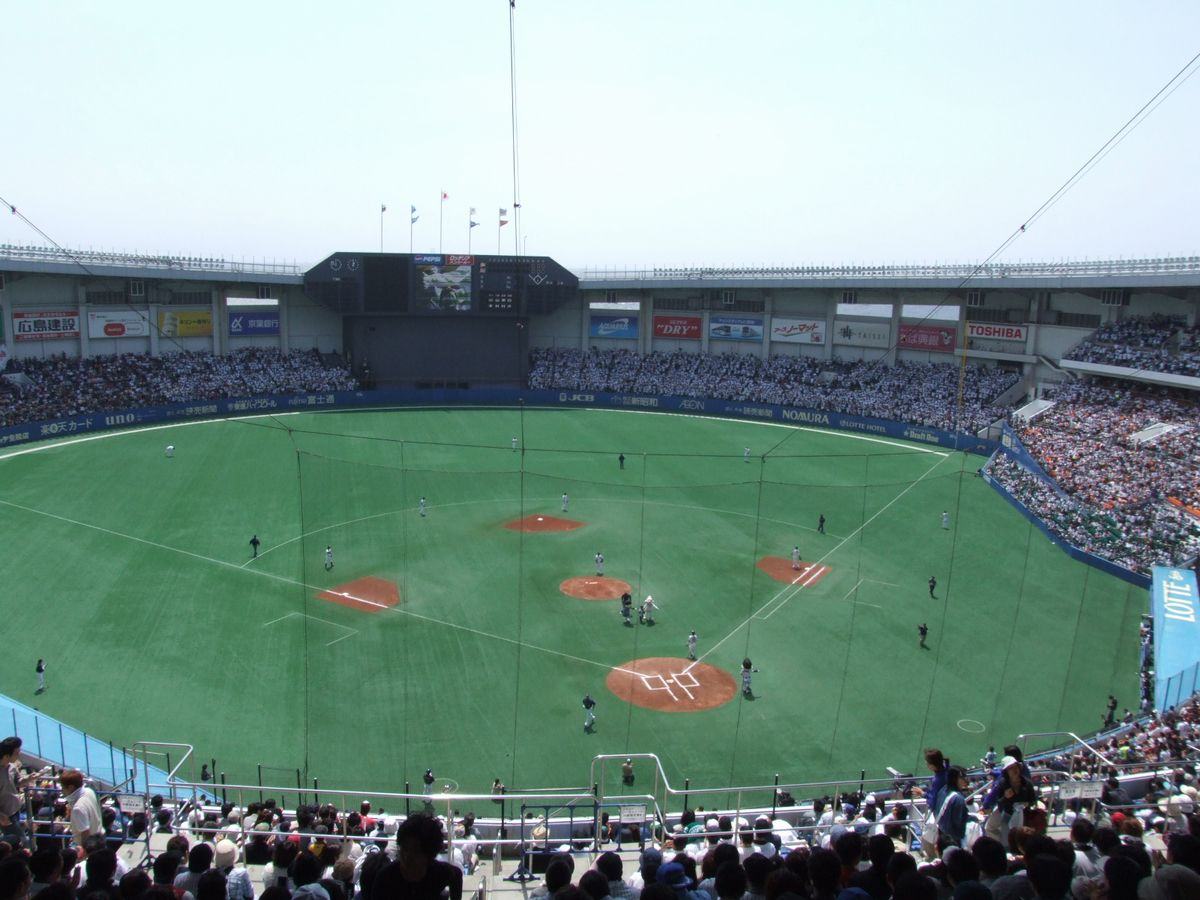
Chiba Marine Stadium

The 2009 Chiba Lotte Marines season features the Marines quest to win their first Pacific League title since 2005. This was the final season that Bobby Valentine managed the Marines.

== Regular season ==
=== Standings ===
2009 Pacific League regular season standings
Pos	Team	Pld	W	L	T	GB	PCT	Home	Away
1	Hokkaido Nippon-Ham Fighters	144	82	60	2	—	.576	46–25–1	36–35–1
2	Tohoku Rakuten Golden Eagles	144	77	66	1	6.5	.538	39–32–1	38–34–0
3	Fukuoka SoftBank Hawks	144	74	65	5	3.5	.531	40–28–4	34–37–1
4	Saitama Seibu Lions	144	70	70	4	9	.500	38–32–2	32–38–2
5	Chiba Lotte Marines	144	62	77	5	15.5	.448	37–31–4	25–46–1
6	Orix Buffaloes	144	56	86	2	26	.396	32–40–0	24–46–2

=== Game log ===
2009 Game Log
April

#	Date	Opponent	Score	Win	Loss	Save	Attendance	Record
1	April 3	Lions	2 - 5	Wakui (1-0)	Shimizu (0-1)	Graman (1)	30,041	0-1-0
2	April 4	Lions	10 - 5	Komiyama (1-0)	Hoashi (0-1)		26,819	1-1-0
3	April 5	Lions	6 - 5	Sikorski (1-0)	Graman (0-1)		24,313	2-1-0
4	April 7	@Fighters	9 - 1	Tadano (1-0)	Karakawa (0-1)		17,568	2-2-0
5	April 8	@Fighters	8 - 7	Tateyama (1-0)	Sikorski (1-1)	Takeda (1)	18,853	2-3-0
6	April 10	@Buffaloes	10 - 8	Katsuki (1-0)	Shimizu (0-2)		27,827	2-4-0
7	April 11	@Buffaloes	5 - 2	Kondo (2-0)	Kobayashi (0-1)	Kato (2)	30,444	2-5-0
8	April 12	@Buffaloes	4 - 1	Kishida (1-0)	Ono (0-1)	Kato (3)	31,597	2-6-0
9	April 14	Eagles	1 - 2	Tanaka (2-0)	Watanabe (0-1)		9,247	2-7-0
10	April 15	Eagles	7 - 1	Karakawa (1-1)	Asai (0-2)		16,235	3-7-0
11	April 16	Eagles	11 - 7 (10)	Sikorski (2-1)	Koyama (0-1)		13,984	4-7-0
12	April 17	Hawks	2 - 1 (11)	Ogino (1-0)	Settsu (0-1)		10,367	5-7-0
13	April 18	Hawks	4 - 7	Kume (1-0)	Ito (0-1)	Mahara (2)	23,225	5-8-0
14	April 19	Hawks	5 - 12	Sugiuchi (2-0)	Kobayashi (0-2)		25,537	5-9-0
—	April 21	@Eagles	Postponed (rained out)					
15	April 22	@Eagles	2 - 0	Tanaka (3-0)	Watanabe (0-2)		12,909	5-10-0
16	April 23	@Eagles	2 - 5	Ono (1-1)	Hasebe (0-2)	Ogino (1)	11,444	6-10-0
17	April 24	@Lions	3 - 1	Wakui (3-1)	Karakawa (1-2)		12,618	6-11-0
18	April 25	@Lions	2 - 3	Naruse (1-0)	Hoashi (0-2)	Ogino (2)	23,147	7-11-0
19	April 26	@Lions	5 - 11	Omine (1-0)	Wasdin (0-2)		23,647	8-11-0
20	April 28	Buffaloes	3 - 4	Kato (2-0)	Sikorski (2-2)		13,198	8-12-0
21	April 29	Buffaloes	3 - 5	Kaneko (2-2)	Watanabe (0-3)	Kato (5)	24,756	8-13-0
22	April 30	Buffaloes	5 - 2	Ito (1-1)	Kikuchihara (0-1)		12,212	9-13-0

May

#	Date	Opponent	Score	Win	Loss	Save	Attendance	Record
23	May 1	@Hawks	6 - 2	Wada (2-2)	Ono (1-2)		26,830	9-14-0
24	May 2	@Hawks	4 - 9	Karakawa (2-2)	Arakaki (0-1)		30,239	10-14-0
25	May 3	@Hawks	7 - 2	Sugiuchi (3-1)	Naruse (1-1)		34,040	10-15-0
26	May 4	Fighters	7 - 10	Tadano (2-2)	Omine (1-1)	Takeda (6)	30,058	10-16-0
27	May 5	Fighters	0 - 2 (5)	Yagi (2-0)	Kobayashi (0-3)		22,726	10-17-0
28	May 6	Fighters	7 - 3	Watanabe (1-3)	Sweeney (0-3)		23,139	11-17-0
29	May 8	Eagles	4 - 3	Shimizu (1-2)	Nagai (3-1)	Ogino (3)	13,263	12-17-0
30	May 9	Eagles	2 - 6	Iwakuma (4-1)	Ono (1-3)		24,668	12-18-0
31	May 10	Eagles	6 - 0	Karakawa (3-2)	Rasner (2-2)		24,023	13-18-0
32	May 12	@Hawks	1 - 2	Naruse (2-1)	Houlton (2-3)	Ogino (4)	25,231	14-18-0
33	May 13	@Hawks	0 - 7	Omine (2-1)	Otonari (1-3)		16,242	15-18-0
34	May 14	@Hawks	5 - 4	Falkenborg (1-0)	Ogino (1-1)		29,671	15-19-0
35	May 15	Lions	0 - 18	Wakui (4-1)	Watanabe (1-4)		17,567	15-20-0
36	May 16	Lions	6 - 4	Ito (2-1)	Onuma (1-2)	Ogino (5)	20,074	16-20-0
37	May 17	Lions	8 - 5	Ono (2-3)	Hirano (0-1)	Ogino (6)	14,363	17-20-0
38	May 19	BayStars	2 - 1	Karakawa (4-2)	Ishii (0-5)		16,387	18-20-0
39	May 20	BayStars	1 - 4	Walrond (3-3)	Naruse (2-2)	Yamaguchi (2-2)	17,019	18-21-0
40	May 22	Dragons	1 - 4	Yoshimi (4-2)	Omine (2-2)	Iwase (10)	14,660	18-22-0
41	May 23	Dragons	2 - 1	Sikorski (3-2)	Hirai (0-1)		28,117	19-22-0
—	May 24	@Tigers	No game (called after 4 innings)					
42	May 25	@Tigers	4 - 3	Kubo (1-2)	Shimizu (1-3)	Fujikawa (3)	43,474	19-23-0
43	May 26	@Tigers	2 - 3	Sikorski (4-2)	Fujikawa (1-3)	Ogino (7)	26,680	20-23-0
44	May 27	@Carp	8 - 3	Maeda (3-5)	Karakawa (4-3)		22,513	20-24-0
45	May 28	@Carp	4 - 3	Lewis (3-2)	Kobayashi (0-4)	Nagakawa (14)	12,048	20-25-0
46	May 30	Swallows	6 - 3	Naruse (3-2)	Tanaka (0-1)		15,431	21-25-0
47	May 31	Swallows	1 - 7	Kawashima (4-3)	Omine (2-3)		27,310	21-26-0

June

#	Date	Opponent	Score	Win	Loss	Save	Attendance	Record
48	June 2	Giants	0 - 0 (12)	Game tied after 12 innings			25,249	21-26-1
49	June 3	Giants						
50	June 5	@Dragons						
51	June 6	@Dragons						
52	June 7	@BayStars						
53	June 8	@BayStars						
54	June 10	Carp						
55	June 11	Carp						
56	June 13	Tigers						
57	June 14	Tigers						
58	June 17	@Swallows						
59	June 18	@Swallows						
60	June 20	@Giants						
61	June 21	@Giants						
62	June 26	Fighters						
63	June 27	Fighters						
64	June 28	Fighters						
65	June 30	@Lions						

== Player stats ==
=== Batting ===
Player	G	AB	H	Avg.	HR	RBI	SB

=== Pitching ===
Player	G	GS	IP	W	L	SV	ERA	SO
