= 2009 Tohoku Rakuten Golden Eagles season =

Professional sports season in Nippon Professional Baseball

2009 Tohoku Rakuten Golden Eagles
- Climax Series berth
- 5th anniversary logo
- League: Pacific League
- Ballpark: Kleenex Stadium Miyagi
- Record: 77–66–1 (.538)
- League place: 2nd
- Parent company: Rakuten
- President: Toru Shimada
- Manager: Katsuya Nomura
- Average attendance: 16,711

The 2009 Tohoku Rakuten Golden Eagles season features the Eagles quest to win their first Pacific League title.

== Regular season ==
=== Standings ===
2009 Pacific League regular season standings
Pos	Team	Pld	W	L	T	GB	PCT	Home	Away
1	Hokkaido Nippon-Ham Fighters	144	82	60	2	—	.576	46–25–1	36–35–1
**2**	Tohoku Rakuten Golden Eagles	**144**	**77**	**66**	**1**	**6.5**	.538	**39–32–1**	**38–34–0**
3	Fukuoka SoftBank Hawks	144	74	65	5	3.5	.531	40–28–4	34–37–1
4	Saitama Seibu Lions	144	70	70	4	9	.500	38–32–2	32–38–2
5	Chiba Lotte Marines	144	62	77	5	15.5	.448	37–31–4	25–46–1
6	Orix Buffaloes	144	56	86	2	26	.396	32–40–0	24–46–2

=== Game log ===
2009 game log: 77–66–1 (Home: 39–32–1; Away: 38–34–0)
April: 4–4–0 (Home: 2–0–0; Away: 2–4–0)

#	Date	Opponent	Score	Win	Loss	Save	Stadium	Attendance	Record	Streak
1	April 3	@Fighters	1 - 3	**Iwakuma** (1-0)	Darvish (0-1)	**Arime** (1)	42,328	1-0-0		
2	April 4	@Fighters	5 - 6	**Gwyn** (1-0)	Fujii (0-1)	**Kawagishi** (1)	36,316	2-0-0		
3	April 5	@Fighters	6 - 9 (11)	**Kawagishi** (1-0)	Sakamoto (0-1)		34,252	3-0-0		
4	April 7	Hawks	6 - 0	**Tanaka** (1-0)	Loe (0-1)		17,281	4-0-0		
5	April 8	Hawks	0 - 7	Houlton (1-0)	**Asai** (0-1)		13,373	4-1-0		
6	April 9	Hawks	2 - 1	**Nagai** (1-0)	Otonari (0-1)	**Koyama** (1)	12,418	5-1-0		
7	April 10	Lions	0 - 6	Wakui (2-0)	**Iwakuma** (1-1)		15,990	5-2-0		
8	April 11	Lions	2 - 5	Onodera (1-0)	**Hasebe** (0-1)	Graman (2)	17,835	5-3-0		
9	April 12	Lions	4 - 1	**Rasner** (1-0)	Wasdin (0-1)		17,477	6-3-0		
10	April 14	@Marines	1 - 2	**Tanaka** (2-0)	Watanabe (0-1)		9,247	7-3-0		
11	April 15	@Marines	7 - 1	Karakawa (1-1)	**Asai** (0-2)		16,235	7-4-0		
12	April 16	@Marines	11 - 7 (10)	Sikorski (2-1)	**Koyama** (0-1)		13,984	7-5-0		
13	April 18	@Buffaloes	0 - 7	**Iwakuma** (2-1)	Kondo (2-1)		20,598	8-5-0		
14	April 19	@Buffaloes	15 - 0	Kishida (2-0)	**Rasner** (1-1)		21,561	8-6-0		
—	April 21	Marines	Postponed (rained out)							
15	April 22	Marines	2 - 0	**Tanaka** (3-0)	Watanabe (0-2)		12,909	9-6-0		
16	April 23	Marines	2 - 5	Ono (1-1)	**Hasebe** (0-2)	Ogino (1)	11,444	9-7-0		
17	April 24	@Hawks	2 - 3	**Nagai** (2-0)	Wada (1-2)	**Gwyn** (1)	27,568	10-7-0		
18	April 25	@Hawks	5 - 4 (11)	Mahara (1-0)	**Asai** (0-3)		31,021	10-8-0		
19	April 26	@Hawks	0 - 4	**Rasner** (2-1)	Sugiuchi (2-1)	**Koyama** (2)	31,787	11-8-0		
20	April 28	Fighters	2 - 4	Yagi (1-0)	**Kawai** (0-1)	Takeda (5)	13,326	11-9-0		
21	April 29	Fighters	2 - 1	**Tanaka** (4-0)	Takeda (1-1)		20,381	12-9-0		
22	April 30	Fighters	4 - 2	**Hasebe** (1-2)	Sweeney (0-2)	**Arime** (2)	11,239	13-9-0		

May: 4–4–0 (Home: 2–0–0; Away: 2–4–0)

#	Date	Opponent	Score	Win	Loss	Save	Stadium	Attendance	Record	Streak
23	May 1	Buffaloes	12 - 2	**Nagai** (3-0)	Nakayama (0-2)		12,262	14-9-0		
24	May 2	Buffaloes	7 - 3	**Iwakuma** (3-1)	Komatsu (0-3)		20,246	15-9-0		
25	May 3	Buffaloes	8 - 4	**Koyama** (1-1)	Kishida (3-1)		20,619	16-9-0		
26	May 4	@Lions	8 - 3	Kishi (5-0)	**Kawai** (0-2)		33,911	16-10-0		
27	May 5	@Lions	3 - 7	**Isaka** (1-0)	Ishii (1-3)		33,908	17-10-0		
28	May 6	@Lions	3 - 6	**Hasebe** (2-2)	Nishiguchi (2-1)		31,440	18-10-0		
29	May 8	@Marines	4 - 3	Shimizu (1-2)	**Nagai** (3-1)	Ogino (3)	13,263	18-11-0		
30	May 9	@Marines	2 - 6	**Iwakuma** (4-1)	Ono (1-3)		24,668	19-11-0		
31	May 10	@Marines	6 - 0	Karakawa (3-2)	**Rasner** (2-2)		24,023	19-12-0		
32	May 12	Fighters	1 - 8	Yagi (3-0)	**Isaka** (1-1)		10,231	19-13-0		
33	May 13	Fighters	7 - 3	**Tanaka** (5-0)	Sakamoto (0-2)		13,983	20-13-0		
34	May 14	Fighters	0 - 7	Sweeney (1-3)	**Hasebe** (2-3)		10,677	20-14-0		
35	May 15	Hawks	2 - 4	Falkenborg (2-0)	**Koyama** (1-2)	Mahara (5)	11,338	21-14-0		
36	May 16	Hawks	1 - 2	**Iwakuma** (5-1)	Kamiuchi (2-1)		17,768	21-15-0		
—	May 17	Hawks	Postponed (rained out)							
37	May 19	Swallows	3 - 7	Ishikawa (6-1)	**Rasner** (2-3)		12,691	21-16-0		
38	May 20	Swallows	2 - 0	**Tanaka** (6-0)	Sato (2-3)		19,295	22-16-0		
39	May 22	Giants	2 - 12	Gonzalez (4-0)	**Nagai** (3-2)		20,170	22-17-0		
40	May 23	Giants	1 - 7	Utsumi (1-3)	**Iwakuma** (5-2)		20,599	22-18-0		
41	May 24	@BayStars	2 - 5	**Hasebe** (3-3)	Kobayashi (1-4)	**Aoyama** (1)	18,041	23-18-0		
42	May 25	@BayStars	6 - 5	Kudoh (1-1)	**Aoyama** (0-1)		18,696	23-19-0		
43	May 27	@Dragons	2 - 3	**Tanaka** (7-0)	Takahashi (1-1)	**Aoyama** (2)	32,208	24-19-0		
44	May 28	@Dragons	2 - 1 (10)	Nagamine (1-0)	**Aoyama** (0-2)		28,262	24-20-0		
—	May 30	Carp	Postponed (rained out)							
45	May 31	Carp	4 - 5	Otake (5-1)	**Iwakuma** (5-3)	Nagakawa (15)	18,015	24-21-0		

June: 4–4–0 (Home: 2–0–0; Away: 2–4–0)

#	Date	Opponent	Score	Win	Loss	Save	Stadium	Attendance	Record	Streak
46	June 1	Carp	0 - 2	Saito (3-3)	**Hasebe** (3-4)	Nagakawa (16)	10,402	24-22-0		
47	June 2	Tigers								
48	June 3	Tigers								
49	June 5	@Swallows								
50	June 6	@Swallows								
51	June 7	@Giants								
52	June 8	@Giants								
53	June 10	Dragons								
54	June 11	Dragons								
55	June 13	BayStars								
56	June 14	BayStars								
57	June 17	@Carp								
58	June 18	@Carp								
59	June 20	@Tigers								
60	June 21	@Tigers								
61	June 26	@Buffaloes								
62	June 27	@Buffaloes								
63	June 28	@Buffaloes								
64	June 30	@Fighters								

July: 4–4–0 (Home: 2–0–0; Away: 2–4–0)

#	Date	Opponent	Score	Win	Loss	Save	Stadium	Attendance	Record	Streak
65	July 1	@Fighters								
66	July 2	@Fighters								
67	July 3	Lions								
68	July 4	Lions								
69	July 5	Lions								
70	July 7	Marines								
71	July 8	Marines								
72	July 9	Marines								
73	July 10	@Hawks								
74	July 11	@Hawks								
75	July 12	@Hawks								
76	July 14	@Lions								
77	July 15	@Lions								
78	July 16	@Lions								
79	July 17	Buffaloes								
80	July 18	Buffaloes								
81	July 19	Buffaloes								
82	July 20	@Hawks								
83	July 21	@Hawks								
84	July 22	@Hawks								
85	July 28	Lions								
86	July 29	Lions								
87	July 31	@Marines								

August: 4–4–0 (Home: 2–0–0; Away: 2–4–0)

#	Date	Opponent	Score	Win	Loss	Save	Stadium	Attendance	Record	Streak
88	August 1	@Marines								
89	August 2	@Marines								
90	August 4	@Buffaloes								
91	August 5	@Buffaloes								
92	August 6	@Buffaloes								
93	August 7	Fighters								
94	August 8	Fighters								
95	August 9	Fighters								
96	August 11	Hawks								
97	August 12	Hawks								
98	August 13	Hawks								
99	August 14	Marines								
100	August 15	Marines								
101	August 16	Marines								
102	August 18	@Fighters								
103	August 19	@Fighters								
104	August 20	@Fighters								
105	August 21	Buffaloes								
106	August 22	Buffaloes								
107	August 23	Buffaloes								
108	August 25	@Lions								
109	August 26	@Lions								
110	August 27	@Lions								
111	August 28	@Marines								
112	August 29	@Marines								
113	August 30	@Marines								

September: 4–4–0 (Home: 2–0–0; Away: 2–4–0)

#	Date	Opponent	Score	Win	Loss	Save	Stadium	Attendance	Record	Streak
114	September 1	Lions								
115	September 2	Lions								
116	September 3	Lions								
117	September 4	Fighters								
118	September 5	Fighters								
119	September 6	Fighters								
120	September 8	@Buffaloes								
121	September 9	@Buffaloes								
122	September 10	@Buffaloes								
123	September 11	@Hawks								
124	September 12	@Hawks								
125	September 13	@Hawks								
126	September 15	@Fighters								
127	September 16	@Fighters								
128	September 17	@Fighters								
129	September 18	Marines								
130	September 19	Marines								
131	September 20	Marines								
132	September 21	Buffaloes								
133	September 22	Buffaloes								
134	September 23	Buffaloes								
135	September 25	@Lions								
136	September 26	@Lions								
137	September 27	@Lions								
138	September 29	Hawks								
139	September 30	Hawks								

October: 4–4–0 (Home: 2–0–0; Away: 2–4–0)

#	Date	Opponent	Score	Win	Loss	Save	Stadium	Attendance	Record	Streak
140	October 1	Hawks								
141	October 3	Lions								
142	October 5	@Buffaloes								

Win | Loss | Tie | Postponement | = Interleague play
**Bold** = Eagles team member

== Player stats ==
=== Batting ===
Player	G	AB	H	Avg.	HR	RBI	SB

=== Pitching ===
Player	G	GS	IP	W	L	SV	ERA	SO
