= 2009 Orix Buffaloes season =

The 2009 Orix Buffaloes season features the Buffaloes quest to win their first Pacific League title under their current franchise configuration.

== Regular season ==
=== Standings ===
2009 Pacific League regular season standings
Pos	Team	Pld	W	L	T	GB	PCT	Home	Away
1	Hokkaido Nippon-Ham Fighters	144	82	60	2	—	.576	46–25–1	36–35–1
2	Tohoku Rakuten Golden Eagles	144	77	66	1	6.5	.538	39–32–1	38–34–0
3	Fukuoka SoftBank Hawks	144	74	65	5	3.5	.531	40–28–4	34–37–1
4	Saitama Seibu Lions	144	70	70	4	9	.500	38–32–2	32–38–2
5	Chiba Lotte Marines	144	62	77	5	15.5	.448	37–31–4	25–46–1
6	Orix Buffaloes	144	56	86	2	26	.396	32–40–0	24–46–2

=== Game log ===
2009 Game Log
April

#	Date	Opponent	Score	Win	Loss	Save	Attendance	Record
1	April 3	@Hawks	8 - 0	Wada (1-0)	Komatsu (0-1)		30,106	0-1-0
2	April 4	@Hawks	2 - 5	Kondo (1-0)	Oba (0-1)	Kato (1)	28,827	1-1-0
3	April 5	@Hawks	2 - 1 (10)	Kamiuchi (1-0)	Kawagoe (0-1)		29,576	1-2-0
4	April 7	@Lions	8 - 3	Kishi (1-0)	Kaneko (0-1)		24,011	1-3-0
5	April 8	@Lions	2 - 10	Yamamoto (1-0)	Ishii (0-1)		10,001	2-3-0
6	April 9	@Lions	13 - 6	Nishiguchi (1-0)	Hirano (0-1)		9,813	2-4-0
7	April 10	Marines	10 - 8	Katsuki (1-0)	Shimizu (0-2)		27,827	3-4-0
8	April 11	Marines	5 - 2	Kondo (2-0)	Kobayashi (0-1)	Kato (2)	30,444	4-4-0
9	April 12	Marines	4 - 1	Kishida (1-0)	Ono (0-1)	Kato (3)	31,597	5-4-0
10	April 14	@Fighters	7 - 8	Kaneko (1-1)	Tadano (1-1)	Kato (4)	17,548	6-4-0
11	April 15	@Fighters	11 - 5	Kikuchi (1-0)	Motoyanagi (0-1)		17,579	6-5-0
12	April 16	@Fighters	7 - 1	Takeda (1-0)	Nakayama (0-1)		20,702	6-6-0
13	April 18	Eagles	0 - 7	Iwakuma (2-1)	Kondo (2-1)		20,598	6-7-0
14	April 19	Eagles	15 - 0	Kishida (2-0)	Rasner (1-1)		21,561	7-7-0
15	April 21	Lions	1 - 7	Kishi (3-0)	Kaneko (1-2)		10,326	7-8-0
16	April 22	Lions	6 - 3	Yamamoto (2-0)	Ishii (0-2)		10,805	8-8-0
17	April 23	Lions	2 - 1	Kato (1-0)	Onuma (0-1)		10,586	9-8-0
18	April 24	Fighters	0 - 11	Darvish (3-1)	Komatsu (0-2)		18,724	9-9-0
—	April 25	Fighters	Postponed (rained out)					
19	April 26	Fighters	11 - 3	Kishida (3-0)	Sakakibara (0-1)		13,223	10-9-0
20	April 28	@Marines	3 - 4	Kato (2-0)	Sikorski (2-2)		13,198	11-9-0
21	April 29	@Marines	3 - 5	Kaneko (2-2)	Watanabe (0-3)	Kato (5)	24,756	12-9-0
22	April 30	@Marines	5 - 2	Ito (1-1)	Kikuchihara (0-1)		12,212	12-10-0

May

#	Date	Opponent	Score	Win	Loss	Save	Attendance	Record
23	May 1	@Eagles	12 - 2	Nagai (3-0)	Nakayama (0-2)		12,262	12-11-0
24	May 2	@Eagles	7 - 3	Iwakuma (3-1)	Komatsu (0-3)		20,246	12-12-0
25	May 3	@Eagles	8 - 4	Koyama (1-1)	Kishida (3-1)		20,619	12-13-0
26	May 4	Hawks	8 - 5	Kondo (3-1)	Loe (0-4)	Kato (6)	30,252	13-13-0
27	May 5	Hawks	2 - 1	Kaneko (3-2)	Houlton (2-2)		31,639	14-13-0
28	May 6	Hawks	1 - 5	Otonari (1-2)	Yamamoto (2-1)		30,960	14-14-0
29	May 8	@Fighters	10 - 1	Darvish (4-1)	Nakayama (0-3)		26,638	14-15-0
30	May 9	@Fighters	3 - 2	Fujii (2-1)	Komatsu (0-4)	Takeda (7)	26,308	14-16-0
31	May 10	@Fighters	7 - 2	Takeda (2-1)	Yoshino (0-1)		28,156	14-17-0
32	May 12	Lions	5 - 6	Kishi (6-0)	Kondo (3-2)	Onodera (2)	10,502	14-18-0
33	May 13	Lions	3 - 8	Ishii (2-3)	Yamamoto (2-2)		10,454	14-19-0
34	May 14	Lions	1 - 3	Nishiguchi (3-1)	Kaneko (3-3)	Onodera (3)	10,229	14-20-0
35	May 15	Fighters	2 - 4	Darvish (5-1)	Nakayama (0-4)	Takeda (8)	11,405	14-21-0
36	May 16	Fighters	3 - 7	Fujii (3-1)	Komatsu (0-5)	Takeda (9)	21,965	14-22-0
37	May 17	Fighters	6 - 0	Mitsuhara (1-0)	Takeda (2-2)		19,467	15-22-0
38	May 19	Carp	1 - 9	Otake (3-1)	Kondo (3-3)		9,887	15-23-0
39	May 20	Carp	10 - 3	Yamamoto (3-2)	Maeda (2-5)		11,107	16-23-0
40	May 22	Tigers	8 - 3	Kaneko (4-3)	Ando (3-3)	Kato (7)	23,433	17-23-0
41	May 23	Tigers	3 - 7	Atchison (3-1)	Vogelsong (0-1)		28,031	17-24-0
42	May 24	@Giants	6 - 8	Hirano (1-1)	Tono (2-3)		42,110	18-24-0
43	May 25	@Giants	6 - 2	Takahashi (3-1)	Kondo (3-4)		40,057	18-25-0
44	May 27	@Swallows	5 - 4	Matsuoka (3-0)	Katsuki (1-1)	Lim (15)	12,014	18-26-0
45	May 28	@Swallows	4 - 0	Tateyama (6-0)	Mitsuhara (1-1)		7,348	18-27-0
46	May 30	BayStars	6 - 4	Kaneko (5-3)	Glynn (2-6)	Kato (8)	11,217	19-27-0
47	May 31	BayStars	3 - 0	Hirano (2-1)	Kobayashi (1-5)		14,857	20-27-0

June

#	Date	Opponent	Score	Win	Loss	Save	Attendance	Record
48	June 2	Dragons						
49	June 3	Dragons						
50	June 5	@Tigers						
51	June 6	@Tigers						
52	June 7	@Carp						
53	June 8	@Carp						
54	June 10	Giants						
55	June 11	Giants						
56	June 13	Swallows						
57	June 14	Swallows						
58	June 16	@BayStars						
59	June 17	@BayStars						
60	June 20	@Dragons						
61	June 21	@Dragons						
62	June 26	Eagles						
63	June 27	Eagles						
64	June 28	Eagles						
65	June 30	@Hawks						

== Player stats ==
=== Batting ===
Player	G	AB	H	Avg.	HR	RBI	SB

=== Pitching ===
Player	G	GS	IP	W	L	SV	ERA	SO
