= Yoshihiro Doi =

Japanese baseball pitcher

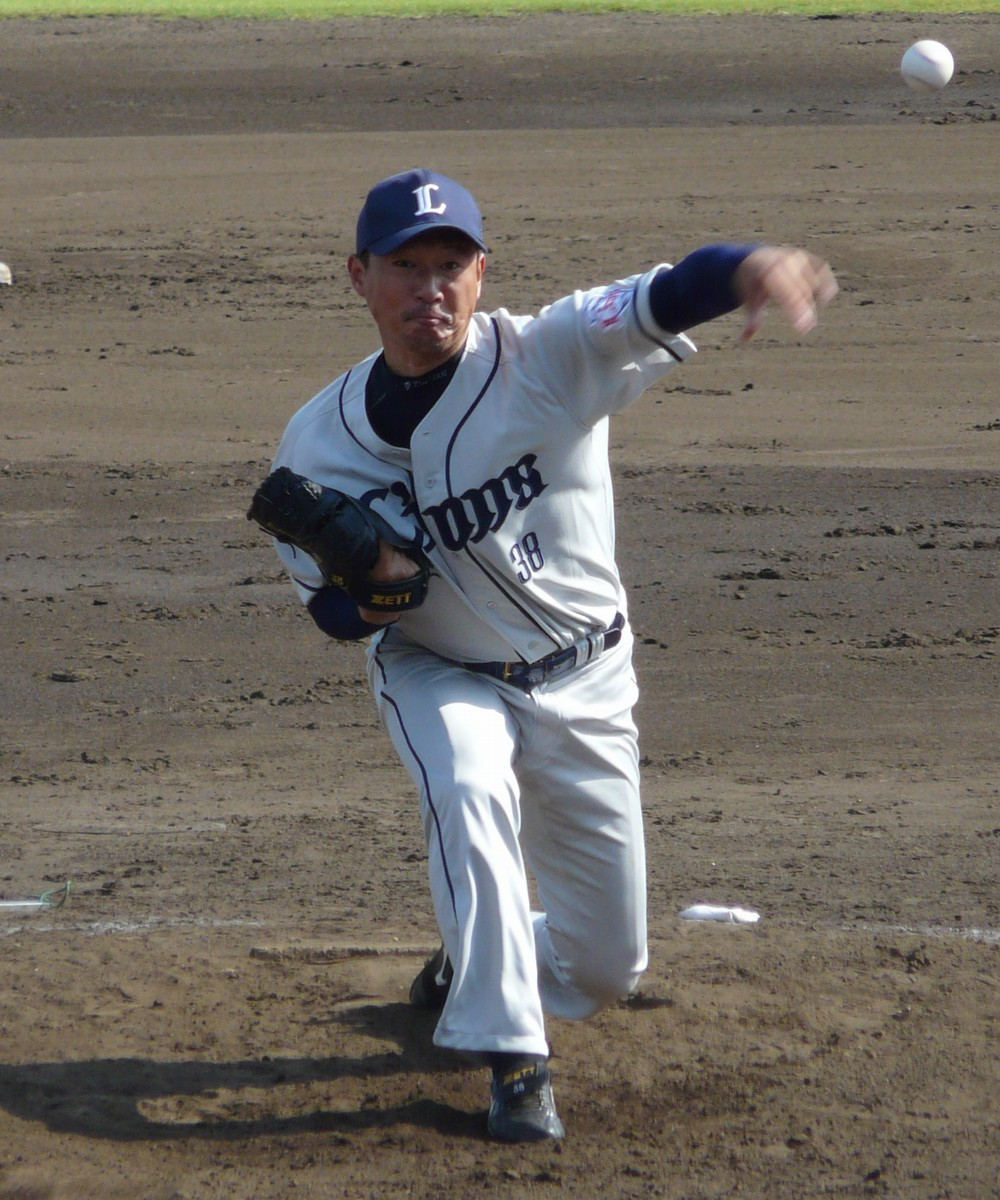
- Doi with the Saitama Seibu Lions

Saitama Seibu Lions – No. 72
- Pitcher / Pitching Coach
- Born: September 1, 1976 (age 49); Saitama, Japan
- Batted: Left Threw: Left

NPB debut
- May 19, 1998, for the Seibu Lions

Last NPB appearance
- October 9, 2010, for the Saitama Seibu Lions

Career statistics
- Win–loss record: 31-45
- Earned Run Average: 4.30
- Strikeouts: 437
- Saves: 1
- Holds: 7
- Stats at Baseball Reference

Teams
- As player: Seibu Lions (1998–2003); Yokohama BayStars (2004–2008); Saitama Seibu Lions (2009–2010); Na Koa Ikaika Maui (2012); As coach: Na Koa Ikaika Maui (2012); Saitama Seibu Lions (2015–2018, 2025–)

Yoshihiro Doi (土肥 義弘, Doi Yoshihiro) (born September 1, 1976 in Saitama, Japan) is a Japanese baseball pitcher. He pitched for the Saitama Seibu Lions and Yokohama BayStars of Nippon Professional Baseball from 1998 through 2010.
