= Ryoma Nogami =

Japanese baseball player

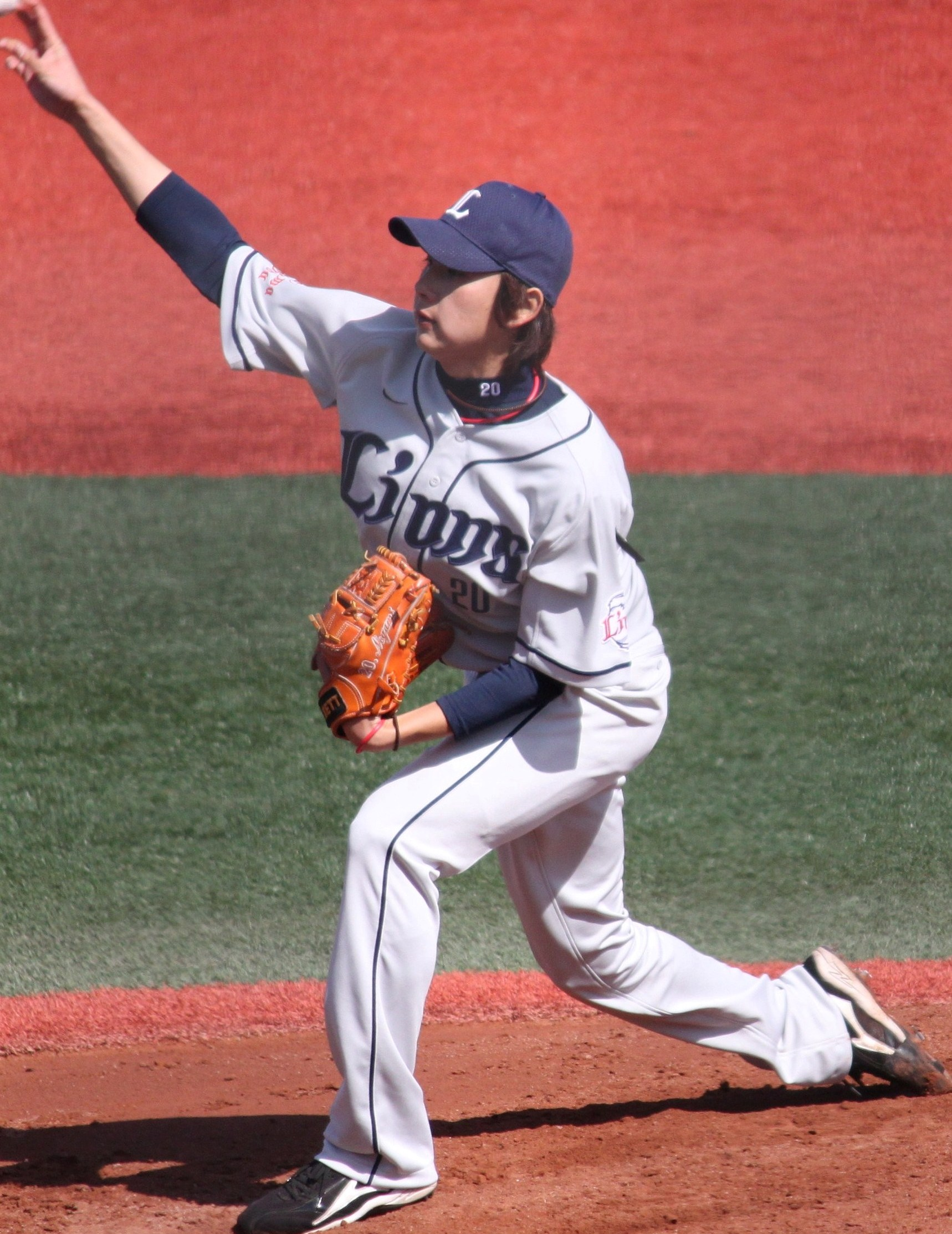
- Nogami with the Saitama Seibu Lions

Yomiuri Giants – No. 104
- Pitcher/Coach
- Born: June 15, 1987 (age 38); Dazaifu, Fukuoka
- Batted: Right Threw: Right

NPB debut
- April 30, 2009, for the Saitama Seibu Lions

Last NPB appearance
- May 24, 2021, for the Yomiuri Giants

NPB statistics (through 2021 season)
- Win–loss: 58–63
- Earned run average: 4.03
- Strikeouts: 623
- Saves: 4
- Holds: 15
- Stats at Baseball Reference

Teams
- As player: Saitama Seibu Lions (2009–2017); Yomiuri Giants (2018–2021); As coach: Yomiuri Giants (2024–present)

Ryoma Nogami (野上 亮磨, Nogami Ryoma; born June 15, 1987 in Dazaifu, Fukuoka, Japan) is a Nippon Professional Baseball pitcher for the Yomiuri Giants in Japan's Central League.

His wife is Japanese idol Rika Ishikawa.
