= Masamitsu Hirano =

Japanese baseball player

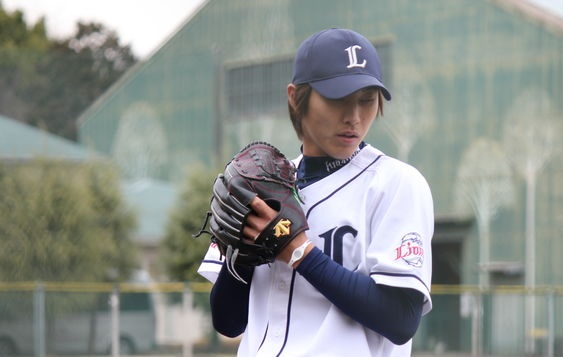
- Hirano with the Saitama Seibu Lions
- Pitcher
- Born: June 28, 1983 (age 42); Saitama, Japan
- Bats: Right Throws: Right

debut
- May 3, 2008, for the Saitama Seibu Lions
- Stats at Baseball Reference

Teams
- Saitama Seibu Lions (2008 – 2015)

Masamitsu Hirano (平野 将光, Hirano Masamitsu; born June 28, 1983 in Saitama, Saitama) is a Nippon Professional Baseball pitcher.
