= Fumiya Nishiguchi =

Japanese baseball player (born 1972)

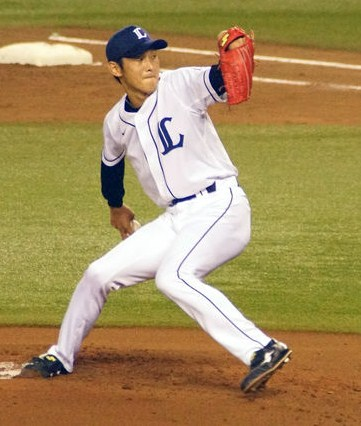
- Nishiguchi with the Saitama Seibu Lions

Saitama Seibu Lions – No. 74
- Pitcher/Coach/Manager
- Born: September 26, 1972 (age 53)
- Batted: Right Threw: Right

NPB debut
- August 16, 1995, for the Seibu Lions

Last NPB appearance
- September 28, 2015, for the Saitama Seibu Lions

NPB statistics
- Win–loss: 182–118
- ERA: 3.73
- Strikeouts: 2,082

Teams
- As player: Seibu Lions/Saitama Seibu Lions (1995–2015); As coach: Saitama Seibu Lions (2017–2024); As manager: Saitama Seibu Lions (2025–present)

Career highlights and awards
- 1997 Pacific League MVP; 4× NPB All-Star (1996, 1997, 1999, 2005); 2× Pacific League Win Champion (1997, 1998); 2× Pacific League Strikeout Champion (1997, 1998); 1× Eiji Sawamura Award (1997); 2× Pacific League Best Nine Award (1997, 1998); 3× Pacific League Golden Glove (1997, 1998, 2002); 2× Japan Series champion (2004, 2008)

Fumiya Nishiguchi (西口 文也, Nishiguchi Fumiya), (born September 26, 1972) is a Japanese former professional baseball right-handed pitcher and current manager for the Saitama Seibu Lions of Nippon Professional Baseball (NPB). He played 21 seasons in NPB, all for the Lions.

== Career ==
On September 23, 2024, Nishiguchi was announced as the new manager for the Saitama Seibu Lions.

=== Career statistics ===
Nippon Professional Baseball
Year	Age	Team	W	L	W%	GS	CG	SHO	IP	H	R	ER	HR	BB	K	ERA	WHIP
1995	22	Seibu	2	0	1.000	4	1	1	45.1	43	15	10	2	10	34	1.99	1.18
1996	23	Seibu	16	10	.615	27	**13**	2	210.1	172	77	74	21	74	173	3.17	1.18
1997	24	Seibu	**15**	5	**.750**	26	10	0	207.2	187	85	72	20	68	**192**	3.12	1.25
1998	25	Seibu	**13**	12	.520	25	8	**5**	181.0	160	80	68	16	73	**148**	3.38	1.31
1999	26	Seibu	14	10	.583	27	7	**3**	**179.1**	141	72	68	20	55	141	3.41	1.11
2000	27	Seibu	11	5	.688	20	4	**2**	145.2	136	62	61	22	59	131	3.77	1.36
2001	28	Seibu	14	9	.609	28	1	0	165.1	156	85	80	18	85	143	4.35	1.50
2002	29	Seibu	15	10	.600	29	3	2	182.0	166	76	71	25	51	180	3.51	1.22
2003	30	Seibu	6	3	.667	14	0	0	76.1	85	60	58	19	31	69	6.84	1.56
2004	31	Seibu	10	5	.667	21	0	0	117.1	97	50	42	19	56	112	3.22	1.34
2005	32	Seibu	17	5	.773	25	3	1	172.0	157	55	53	13	34	137	2.77	1.16
2006	33	Seibu	9	9	.500	26	2	0	177.1	175	76	70	**22**	65	154	3.55	1.41
2007	34	Seibu	9	11	.450	25	0	0	153.2	149	78	73	18	44	103	4.28	1.30
2008	35	Seibu	8	6	.571	21	0	0	116.1	125	69	65	18	48	92	5.03	1.52
2009	36	Seibu	4	4	.500	16	0	0	93.1	110	55	53	14	38	60	5.11	1.59
2010	37	Seibu	3	2	.600	12	0	0	57.1	65	36	35	8	27	43	5.49	1.61
2011	38	Seibu	11	7	.611	22	2	1	140.0	104	44	40	5	41	104	2.57	1.04
2012	39	Seibu	5	2	.714	14	0	0	81.2	77	35	34	4	29	44	3.75	1.30
2013	40	Seibu	0	2	.000	4	0	0	10.2	18	10	10	2	9	7	8.44	2.53
**Career**			**182**	**117**	**.609**	**386**	**54**	**17**	**2512.2**	**2323**	**1120**	**1037**	**286**	**897**	**2067**	**3.71**	**1.28**

Bold indicates league leader; statistics current as of December 25, 2013
