= Tsuyoshi Kikuchihara =

Japanese baseball player (born 1975)

Hiroshima Toyo Carp – No. 86
- Pitcher / Coach
- Born: March 7, 1975 (age 50); Sagamihara, Kanagawa, Japan
- Batted: Left Threw: Left

Professional debut
- CPBL: July 11, 1995, for the China Times Eagles
- NPB: May 30, 1997, for the Hiroshima Toyo Carp

Last appearance
- CPBL: August 31, 1995, for the China Times Eagles
- NPB: October 2, 2013, for the Hiroshima Toyo Carp

NPB statistics
- Win–loss record: 0–2
- Earned run average: 5.46
- Strikeouts: 16

NPB statistics
- Win–loss record: 15–26
- Earned run average: 4.51
- Strikeouts: 327

Teams
- As player: China Times Eagles (1995); Hiroshima Toyo Carp (1997–2004); Orix Buffaloes (2005–2010); Hiroshima Toyo Carp (2011–2013); As coach: Hiroshima Toyo Carp (2014–present)

Career highlights and awards
- Pacific League Best Relief Pitcher Award (2005); NPB All-Star (2006)

Tsuyoshi Kikuchihara (菊地原 毅, Kikuchihara Tsuyoshi; born March 7, 1975) is a Japanese former professional baseball pitcher. He played in the Chinese Professional Baseball League (CPBL) for the China Times Eagles, and in Nippon Professional Baseball (NPB) for the Hiroshima Toyo Carp and Orix Buffaloes.
