= Alex Graman =

American baseball player (born 1977)

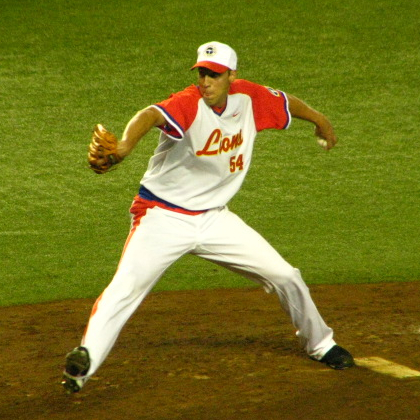
- Relief pitcher
- Born: November 17, 1977 (age 48); Huntingburg, Indiana, U.S.
- Bats: Left Throws: Left

Professional debut
- MLB: April 20, 2004, for the New York Yankees
- NPB: March 29, 2006, for the Seibu Lions

MLB statistics
- Win–loss record: 0–0
- Earned run average: 18.47
- Strikeouts: 4

NPB statistics
- Win–loss record: 13–18
- Earned run average: 3.82
- Strikeouts: 160
- Stats at Baseball Reference

Teams
- New York Yankees (2004–2005); Seibu Lions / Saitama Seibu Lions (2006–2011)

Career highlights and awards
- Asia Series champion (2008); Japan Series champion (2008)

Alex Joseph Graman (born November 17, 1977) is an American former professional baseball pitcher. He played in Major League Baseball (MLB) for the New York Yankees, and in Nippon Professional Baseball for the Seibu Lions / Saitama Seibu Lions. He bats and throws left-handed.

== Amateur career ==
Graman was a three-time letterman for coach Bob Warn at Indiana State University from 1997 to 1999. He finished his career as a second team All-MVC in 1998. Graman ranks fourth in Indiana State history with five games of 10+ strikeouts in a career and is seventh on the school's single season strikeout list with 112.

== Professional career ==
=== New York Yankees ===
==== Minor leagues ====
Graman was drafted in the third round (111th overall) of the 1999 Major League Baseball draft by the New York Yankees.

Graman spent six seasons in the New York Yankees system; 1999 with the Staten Island Yankees, where he went 6-3 and was named the Top Prospect in the New York–Penn League. In 2000, he was with the Tampa Yankees of the Florida State League, compiled a record of 8-9 and was promoted to Double-A with the Norwich Navigators of the Eastern League. he spent 2001 and part of 2002 with the Navigators as he went 17-11 and earned another promotion to Triple-A with the Columbus Clippers of the International League in 2002. He spent the next four seasons (2002–2005) in Columbus, going 31–31, and New York. In 2004, he led the International League in strikeouts (129) and was selected as an All-Star for the Clippers.

Minor League Career Pitching
G	GS	CG	W	L	ERA	K	BB	IP
177	167	8	64	56	3.73	820	352	963.1

==== Major leagues ====
Graman made his MLB debut with the Yankees in 2004, after six seasons in the Yankee farm system. In his first start against the Chicago White Sox, he gave up five runs in 2 2/3 innings pitched. In his next start against the Tampa Bay Devil Rays, he only lasted a third of an inning, giving up five earned runs, but avoided a loss in both appearances. He was removed from the 40-man roster and sent outright to the Columbus after the game. Graman finished the year with a 19.80 ERA.

In 2005, he fared only slightly better, giving up 2 earned runs in one and a third innings before being designated for assignment by the Yankees and later released. In five Major League games, all with the Yankees, he has pitched in 6 1/3 innings and given up 17 hits and 13 runs all earned for an ERA of 18.47.

=== Cincinnati Reds ===
On August 10, 2005, Graman signed with the Cincinnati Reds. He pitched in five games for their Triple-A affiliate, the Louisville Bats, but despite having a 3.09 ERA, Graman was released on September 12.

=== Seibu Lions / Saitama Seibu Lions ===
On January 15, 2006, Graman signed a one-year, 50 million yen (about US$467,000) contract with the Seibu Lions of Nippon Professional Baseball. Graman re-signed with the Lions after the season. Beginning in 2007, he replaced Chikara Onodera as the closer.

Graman came into his own as a closer, finishing 2008 with a 3–3 record, 31 saves, and a 1.42 ERA. He helped the Lions win the Pacific League championship and the Climax Series before saving Games 1 and 7 of the Japan Series as Seibu beat the Yomiuri Giants 4 games to 3. Graman tossed the final two innings of Game 7, allowing no hits or walks while striking out two. He finished the postseason by allowing two earned runs in five innings, but did not allow a run in three Japan Series frames.

Opening day 2009 found Alex with the defending champions, the Saitama Seibu Lions for his fourth season in the Japanese Pacific League.

Graman's development as a pitcher while in Japan, led many in baseball to believe he would return to the Major Leagues as a set-up man or long reliever.

On January 16, 2012, Graman signed a contract with a bonus of $50,000 with Kia Tigers of the KBO League. However, he failed the medical test and the pitching workout. Tigers decided not to sign Graman on February 5.

== Coaching career ==
Following his retirement, Graman began a career in youth baseball; spending 4 years with the Indiana Bulls travel team and a similar tenure with Zionsville High School. He is also an instructor at a sports development academy near Indianapolis.
