= Hideaki Wakui =

Japanese baseball player (born 1986)

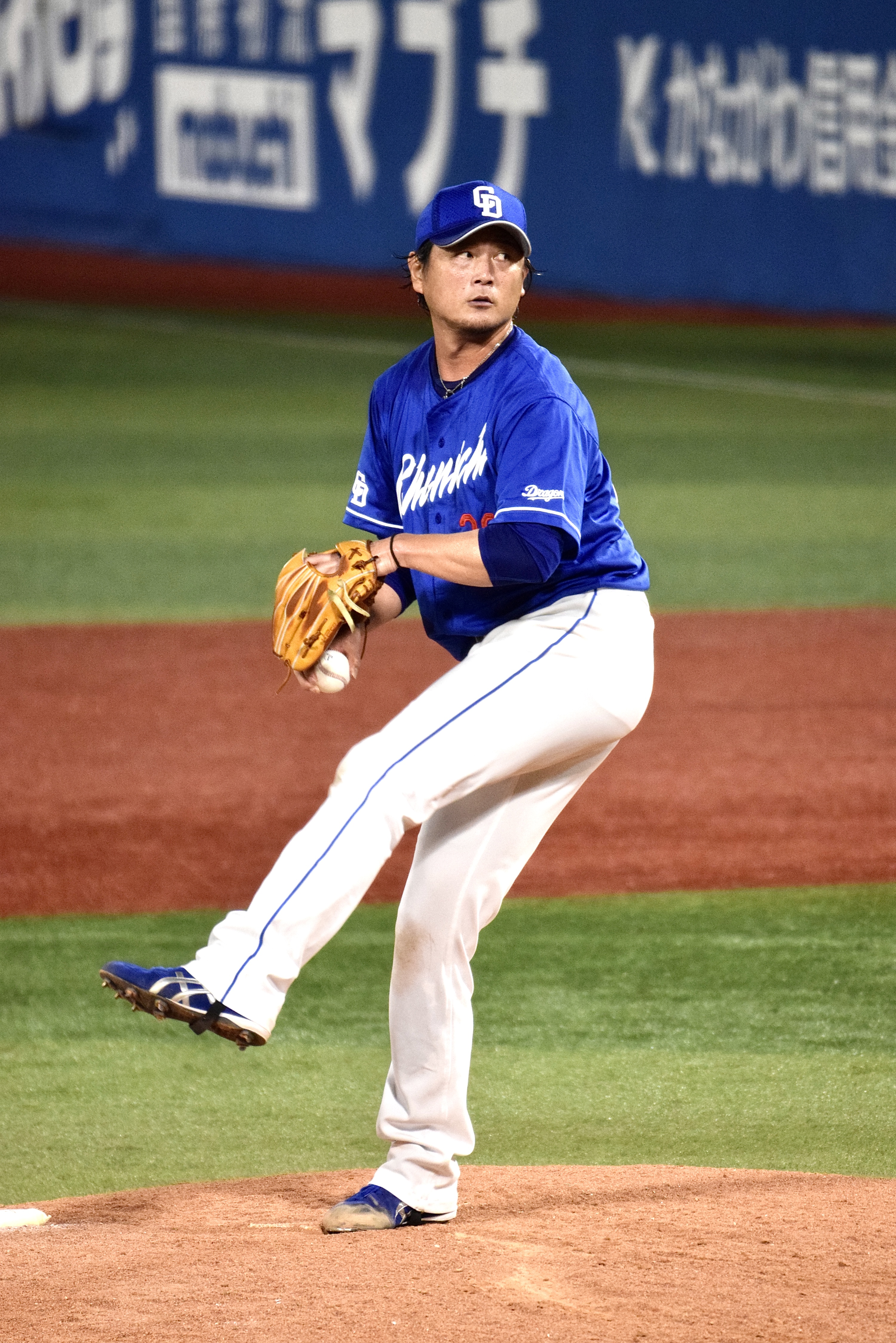
- Wakui with the Chunichi Dragons in 2023

Chunichi Dragons – No. 20
- Starting pitcher
- Born: June 21, 1986 (age 40); Matsudo, Chiba, Japan
- Bats: Right Throws: Right

NPB debut
- March 29, 2005, for the Seibu Lions

NPB statistics (through July 25, 2026)
- Win–loss record: 168-168
- Earned run average: 3.58
- Strikeouts: 2,112
- Stats at Baseball Reference

Teams
- Seibu Lions / Saitama Seibu Lions (2005–2013); Chiba Lotte Marines (2014–2019); Tohoku Rakuten Golden Eagles (2020–2022); Chunichi Dragons (2023–present)

Career highlights and awards
- Eiji Sawamura Award (2009); Pacific League Climax Series MVP (2008); 3× Pacific League wins leader (2007, 2009, 2015); Japan Series champion (2008); 4× Pacific League Mitsui Golden Glove Award (2009–2010, 2015-2016); 6× NPB All-Star (2006–2007, 2009–2010, 2015-2016)
Medals
Representing Japan
Men's baseball
World Baseball Classic
Gold medal – first place	2009 Los Angeles	Team
Asian Baseball Championship
Gold medal – first place	2007 Taichung	Team
World Junior Baseball Championship
Silver medal – second place	2004 Taipei	Team

Hideaki Wakui (涌井 秀章, Wakui Hideaki; born June 21, 1986) is a Japanese professional baseball pitcher for the Chunichi Dragons of Nippon Professional Baseball (NPB). He has previously played in NPB for the Seibu Lions / Saitama Seibu Lions, Chiba Lotte Marines, and Tohoku Rakuten Golden Eagles.

Wakui pitched for the Japanese national team in the 2008 Beijing Olympics and 2009 World Baseball Classic.

His wife is a Japanese model Moe Oshikiri.

== Early life and high school ==
=== Early life ===
Wakui was born in Matsudo, a large city in Chiba Prefecture. He played softball in elementary school and began playing baseball in junior high for Matsudo Senior.

=== 2002–2003 ===
Wakui went on to Yokohama Senior High School, the alma mater of former Boston Red Sox pitcher Daisuke Matsuzaka and a baseball powerhouse that had sent more players to the pros than any other high school in Japan except PL Gakuen Senior High. There, he played in the 75th National High School Baseball Invitational Tournament in 2003 alongside then-ace and current Chiba Lotte Marines left-hander Yoshihisa Naruse (who was a year older than Wakui) in the spring of his second year (the equivalent of eleventh grade in the United States). Wakui was chosen to start in the tournament finals despite having pitched only in relief up until then, but gave up six runs in just 3 2/3 innings to Koryo High School, who, led by current Yomiuri Giants pitcher Kentaro Nishimura, won in a 15–3 rout.

=== Summer 2004 ===
In 2004, Wakui led his team to another berth in a national tournament in his senior year, this time the 86th National High School Baseball Championship held in the summer at Koshien Stadium. He pitched a 10-strikeout complete game win in Yokohama Senior High's first-round match against Hōtoku Gakuen High School; an 11-inning, 14-strikeout complete game shutout in a thrilling 1–0 win in extra innings over Kyoto Gaidai Nishi High School (an affiliate school of Kyoto University of Foreign Studies) in the second round; and a 12-strikeout complete game win over Meitoku Gijuku Senior High School in the third round, clocking speeds as high as 147 km/h (91 mph) with his fastball. However, he was no match for Komazawa University Tomakomai High School in the quarter-finals, giving up 14 hits and six runs (five earned) and allowing second baseman Yuya Hayashi to hit for the cycle en route to a 6–1 loss.

=== Fall 2004 ===
In the Sainokuni Magokoro National Sports Festival held that fall, the last national tournament of his high school career, Wakui avenged his earlier loss against Tomakomai High by pitching a 14-strikeout complete game win in the first round. Yokohama Senior High went on to become the tournament champions.

== Professional career ==
=== Seibu Lions / Saitama Seibu Lions ===
Wakui was picked in the first round of the 2004 NPB amateur draft by the Seibu Lions and later given the uniform number 16. His repertoire at the time included a 148 km/h (92 mph) fastball and a hard slider.

Wakui was named to the Lions' ichigun (Japanese equivalent of "major league") roster for their season opener in his rookie season (2005), earning the first win of his professional career on June 18 in the last interleague game of the season against the Yakult Swallows. However, he finished the year with just a 1–6 record and a 7.32 ERA, giving up 11 home runs in 55 1/3 innings.

On March 26, 2006, his first start of the season, Wakui earned a win against the Orix Buffaloes with Ginjiro Sumitani behind the plate (an 18-year-old rookie catcher straight out of high school), marking the first time a pitcher and catcher both in their teens had won a game in Japanese professional baseball since Tadanori Ishii (now Takuro Ishii) and Motonobu Tanishige accomplished the feat for the Yokohama Taiyo Whales in 1989. The two combined for another win on April 23 against the Tohoku Rakuten Golden Eagles, the first complete game win as well as the first shutout of Wakui's career.

Wakui finished his sophomore season with a respectable 12–8 record, 3.24 ERA and 136 strikeouts in 178 innings pitched. He went 3–1 in June, earning Pacific League Most Valuable Player honors for that month, and made his first All-Star Game appearance via manager selection.

On April 3, 2007, in the fifth inning of a regular season game against the Fukuoka SoftBank Hawks, Wakui became just the 12th pitcher in NPB history to accomplish the unusual feat of striking out four batters in one inning.

He finished the season with a 17–10 record, leading the league in wins for the first time. He also led both Pacific and Central leagues in innings pitched (213) and hits allowed (199) and came second to only Hokkaido Nippon-Ham Fighters ace Yu Darvish in complete games (11).

That year, Wakui was named to the Japanese national team to play in the 2007 Asian Baseball Championship (which also functioned as the Asian qualifying tournament for the 2008 Beijing Olympics). He and fellow 21-year-old Darvish, who had both been chosen to the national team for the first time, were the youngest members of the team. Wakui started in the Japan's first game against the Philippines and held them to just one hit over six shutout innings (Japan won the game 10–0 in seven innings as per the mercy rule).

In 2008, Wakui was named the starter for the Lions' season opener for the first time in his career. He took the mound in their season opener against the Buffaloes on March 20, but incurred the loss despite throwing 140 pitches and holding the Buffaloes to two runs over eight innings.

Wakui was selected to the national team to play in the Olympics, starting in the game against Chinese Taipei in the group stage on August 14 and holding them to one run over six innings in earning the win. He followed up the effort with a two-hit, complete game (seven innings due to mercy rule) shutout against China on August 19. However, he had a down year overall, going just 10–11 in the regular season and posting an ERA (3.90) and WHIP (1.29) that were both worse than that of his 2007 season.

Nevertheless, Wakui took the hill in Game 1 and Game 5 of the Pacific League Climax Series (playoffs) against the Fighters, winning both starts and giving up just one run over 15 combined innings. In particular, he did not allow a single baserunner until two outs in the seventh inning in the latter game, finishing with a three-hit, complete game shutout and clinching a berth in the Japan Series for the Lions. He was named the Pacific League Climax Series MVP. He pitched in three games in the Japan Series, starting Game 1 and Game 5 and even coming on in relief in Game 7 on two days' rest to a key role in the Lions' championship (though he gave up six runs in 16 1/3 innings).

Wakui accepted the team's offer to change his uniform number from 16 to 18 during the off-season, a number that denotes the team's ace pitcher in Japan. The last player to wear the number for the Lions was Matsuzaka, who pitched for the team between 1999 and 2006.The number change also allowed teammate Kazuhisa Ishii to change from #61(which he wore in 2008) to the #16 he wore for his entire career with the Yakult Swallows.

Wakui was named to the national team to play in the 2009 World Baseball Classic. He pitched in three games as a middle reliever, going 1–0 with a 2.70 ERA and contributing to Japan's second consecutive tournament title. He carried over his performance into the 2009 regular season, going 3–1 with a 2.10 ERA in the month of April. In particular, he held the Marines to one run while going the distance in a 12-strikeout, complete game win on April 24, striking out every batter in the Marines' lineup at least once and recording at least one strikeout in every inning (the first time in league history that a pitcher had accomplished the two feats in the same game). He allowed just four hits en route to his first complete game shutout in two years on May 15 against the Marines.

=== Chiba Lotte Marines ===
Wakui joined the Chiba Lotte Marines in 2014 as a free agent after playing nine seasons with the Lions, his original team. He signed a four-year contract worth 1.6 billion yen with the Marines, who hoped to bolster their rotation with his experience and leadership. In his first season with the Marines, Wakui posted a 13-11 record with a 3.38 ERA and 164 strikeouts in 28 games. He also threw two complete games and one shutout, earning his fifth All-Star selection and his first Best Nine award.

In 2015, Wakui continued to pitch well for the Marines, recording a 14-8 record with a 3.06 ERA and 151 strikeouts in 27 games. He led the Pacific League in wins and innings pitched (194.1), and ranked second in ERA and strikeouts. He also threw four complete games and two shutouts, including a no-hitter against the Orix Buffaloes on July 9. He was named to his sixth All-Star team and won his second Best Nine award.

Wakui's performance declined slightly in 2016, as he finished with a 10-8 record and a 3.99 ERA in 25 games. He struck out 122 batters and walked 51, while throwing two complete games and one shutout. He also suffered from some injuries that limited his innings to 158.2, the lowest since his rookie year. He did not make the All-Star team or win any individual awards that year.

In 2017, Wakui bounced back with a solid season for the Marines, going 11-7 with a 3.81 ERA and 139 strikeouts in 26 games. He threw three complete games and one shutout, and logged 172 innings on the mound. He was selected to his seventh All-Star team and won his third Best Nine award.

Wakui had another good year in 2018, posting a 12-8 record with a 3.69 ERA and 144 strikeouts in 27 games. He threw four complete games and one shutout, and pitched 181 innings for the Marines. He was named to his eighth All-Star team and won his fourth Best Nine award.

In his final season with the Marines in 2019, Wakui struggled with inconsistency and injuries, finishing with a 7-11 record and a 4.47 ERA in 23 games. He struck out 108 batters and walked 59, while throwing one complete game and no shutouts. He pitched only 136 innings, the lowest since his second year with the Lions. He did not make the All-Star team or win any individual awards that year.

=== Tohoku Rakuten Golden Eagles ===
On December 19, 2019, the Marines traded Wakui to the Tohoku Rakuten Golden Eagles for cash. On December 23, 2019, the team held a press conference announcing his signing.

=== Chunichi Dragons ===
On November 18, 2022, the Eagles traded Wakui to the Chunichi Dragons in exchange for Toshiki Abe.

== Pitching style ==
Wakui is a 185 cm (6 ft 1 in), 85 kg (187 lb) right-handed pitcher with a three-quarters delivery. While his mechanics are well-balanced and mostly conventional, one unique trait in his delivery is how he completely straightens his left leg in a diagonal direction after raising it (and before dropping and driving towards the plate).

Wakui throws an only average fastball, a mostly four-seamer that usually sits in 140 to 146 km/h (87 to 91 mph) and tops out at 152 km/h (94 mph). However, he complements it with a wide assortment of secondary pitches, including a slider, cutter, curveball, splitter, changeup, and a solid shuuto (two-seamer/sinker). He also has decent command, posting a BB/9 (walks per nine innings rate) of 2.7 in his NPB career.
