= Takashi Kawai =

Japanese baseball player

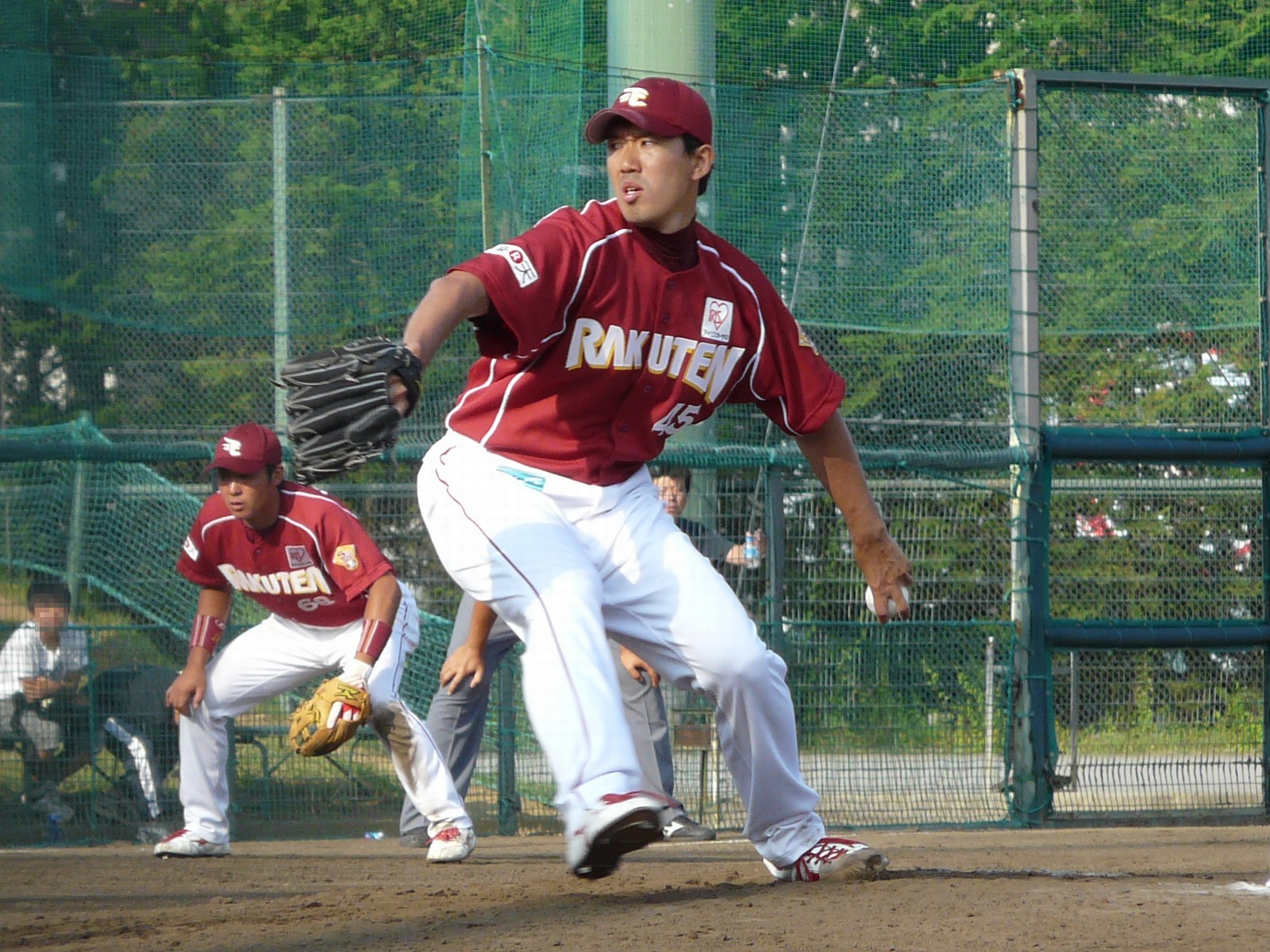
- Kawai with the Tohoku Rakuten Golden Eagles
- Pitcher
- Born: September 16, 1976 (age 49); Sumiyoshi-ku, Osaka, Japan
- Batted: Left Threw: Left

debut
- April 6, 1999, for the Chiba Lotte Marines

Last NPB appearance
- September 14, 2016, for the Tohoku Rakuten Golden Eagles

NPB statistics
- Win–loss record: 28-36
- Earned run average: 4.51
- Strikeouts: 385
- Saves: 0
- Holds: 3
- Stats at Baseball Reference

Teams
- Chiba Lotte Marines (1999 – 2005); Tohoku Rakuten Golden Eagles (2006 – 2016)

Career highlights and awards
- Japan Series champion (2013)

Takashi Kawai (川井 貴志, Kawai Takashi; born September 16, 1976 in Osaka, Japan) is a Japanese Nippon Professional Baseball pitcher for the Tohoku Rakuten Golden Eagles in Japan's Pacific League.

He attended Osaka Tōin High School and Josai University before being drafted by the Chiba Lotte Marines in the third round of the 1998 draft.
