= Shinichiro Koyama =

Japanese baseball player and coach

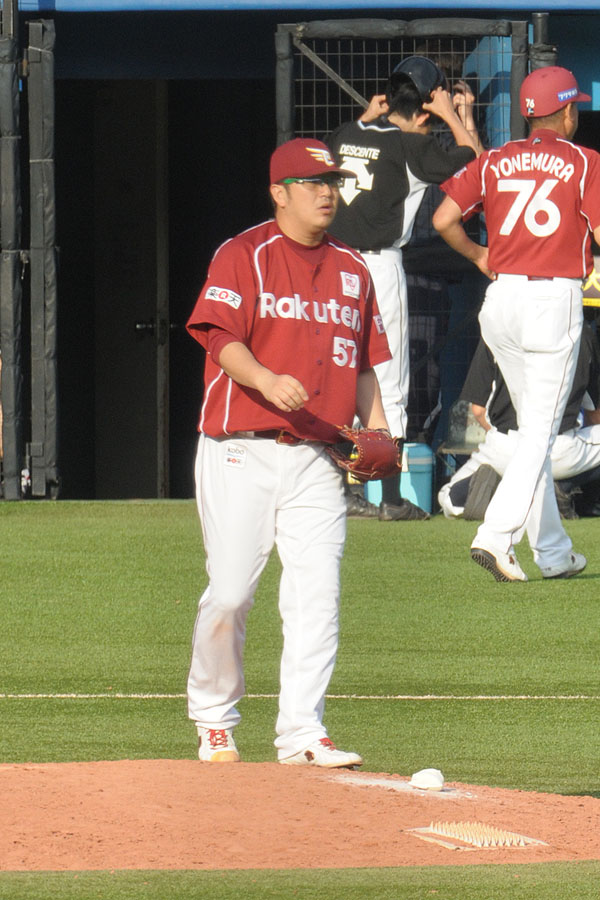
- Koyama with the Tohoku Rakuten Golden Eagles

Chunichi Dragons – No. 77
- Pitcher / Coach
- Born: June 13, 1978 (age 48); Mie, Japan
- Batted: Right Threw: Right

NPB debut
- June 9, 1999, for the Chunichi Dragons

Last NPB appearance
- October 6, 2015, for the Tohoku Rakuten Golden Eagles

NPB statistics
- Win–loss record: 28–36
- Earned run average: 3.87
- Strikeouts: 521
- Saves: 36
- Holds: 84
- Stats at Baseball Reference

Teams
- As player: Chunichi Dragons (1997–2004); Tohoku Rakuten Golden Eagles (2005–2015); As coach: Tohoku Rakuten Golden Eagles (2016–2024); Chunichi Dragons (2025–Present)

Career highlights and awards
- Japan Series champion (2013)

Shinichiro Koyama (小山 伸一郎, Koyama Shinichiro; born June 13, 1978) is a former pitcher and now who played for the Chunichi Dragons and the Tohoku Rakuten Golden Eagles. He is currently a pitching coach for the Chunichi Dragons of Japan's Nippon Professional Baseball.
