= Yuki Karakawa =

Japanese baseball player (born 1989)

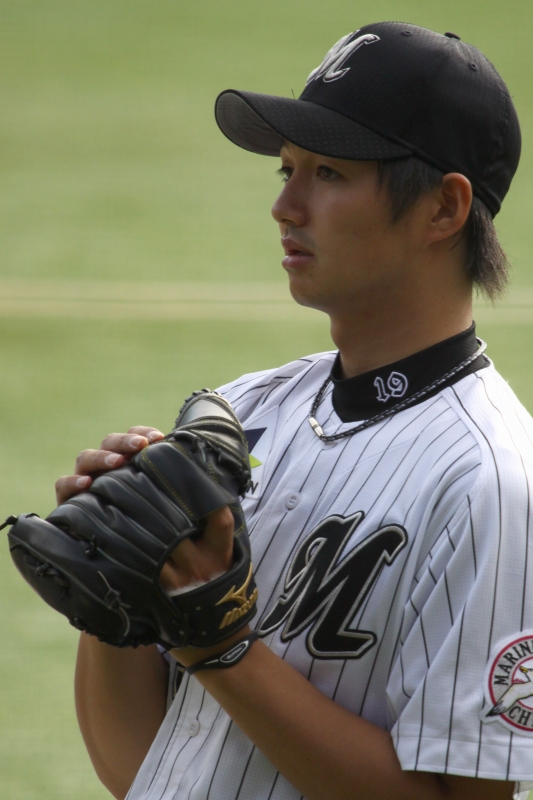

Chiba Lotte Marines – No. 19
- Pitcher
- Born: July 5, 1989 (age 37); Narita, Chiba, Japan
- Bats: Right Throws: Right

NPB debut
- April 26, 2008, for the Chiba Lotte Marines

NPB statistics (through 2024 season)
- Win–loss record: 81-76
- Earned run average: 3.69
- Strikeouts: 851
- Saves: 0
- Holds: 64
- Stats at Baseball Reference

Teams
- Chiba Lotte Marines (2008–2026)

Yuki Karakawa (唐川 侑己, Karakawa Yūki; born July 5, 1989 in Narita, Chiba, Japan) is a Japanese Nippon Professional Baseball pitcher with the Chiba Lotte Marines in Japan's Pacific League.
