= Kōhei Hasebe (baseball) =

Japanese baseball player

Kohei Hasebe
- Pitcher
- Born: May 21, 1985 (age 41); Seki, Japan
- Batted: Left Threw: Left

NPB debut
- May 15, 2008, for the Tohoku Rakuten Golden Eagles

Last NPB appearance
- September 26, 2016, for the Tohoku Rakuten Golden Eagles

Career statistics
- Win–loss record: 11-19
- Earned Run Average: 5.37
- Strikeouts: 205
- Saves: 3
- Holds: 11
- Stats at Baseball Reference

Teams
- Tohoku Rakuten Golden Eagles (2008 – 2016)

Career highlights and awards
- Japan Series champion (2013)

Kohei Hasebe (長谷部 康平, Hasebe Kohei; born May 21, 1985) is a Japanese Nippon Professional Baseball pitcher. He is currently with the Tohoku Rakuten Golden Eagles in Japan's Pacific League.
