= Darrell Rasner =

American baseball player (born 1981)

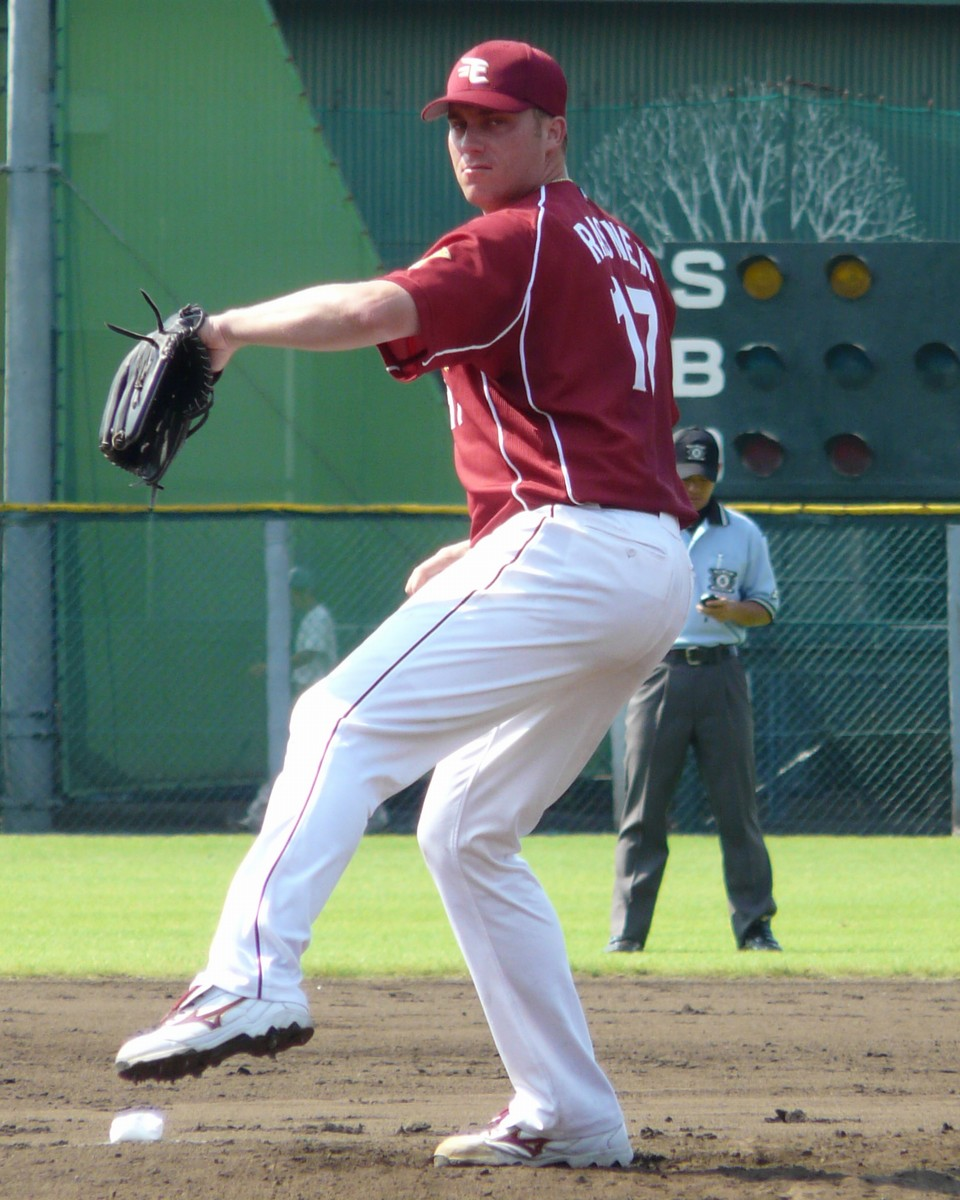
- Rasner with the Tohoku Rakuten Golden Eagles
- Pitcher
- Born: January 13, 1981 (age 45); Carson City, Nevada, U.S.
- Batted: Right Threw: Right

Professional debut
- MLB: September 6, 2005, for the Washington Nationals
- NPB: 2009, for the Tohoku Rakuten Golden Eagles

Last appearance
- MLB: September 28, 2008, for the New York Yankees
- NPB: August 24, 2013, for the Tohoku Rakuten Golden Eagles

MLB statistics
- Win–loss record: 9–15
- Earned run average: 5.00
- Strikeouts: 93

NPB statistics
- Win–loss record: 14–27
- Earned run average: 4.17
- Strikeouts: 288
- Stats at Baseball Reference

Teams
- Washington Nationals (2005); New York Yankees (2006–2008); Tohoku Rakuten Golden Eagles (2009–2013)

Darrell Wayne Rasner, Jr. (born January 13, 1981) is an American former professional baseball pitcher. He played in Major League Baseball (MLB) for the Washington Nationals and New York Yankees and in Nippon Professional Baseball (NPB) for the Tohoku Rakuten Golden Eagles.

== Career ==
=== Amateur career ===
Rasner attended the University of Nevada, Reno, where he played college baseball for the Nevada Wolf Pack. He earned Freshman All-American honors in 2000, with a record of 14-2, 3.52 ERA in 18 appearances. When drafted, he held records for most wins (28) and strikeouts (302) by a Nevada pitcher. In 2015, Rasner was inducted into the Wolf Pack's Hall of Fame.

Rasner was selected by the Montreal Expos with the 5th pick in the second round (46th overall) of the 2002 Major League Baseball draft.

Rasner also has a cousin, Jacob Rasner, who played professional baseball. Jacob was drafted in the 2005 Major League Baseball draft and played for the Double-A Birmingham Barons, an affiliate of the Chicago White Sox.

=== Professional career ===
==== Major League Baseball ====
Rasner began his major league career with the Washington Nationals, pitching in a few games late in the 2005 season. He was claimed off waivers by the New York Yankees on February 11, 2006.

Rasner recorded his first major league win on September 3, 2006, in a game he started for the Yankees against the Minnesota Twins. Rasner went six innings, allowing four hits, one earned run, two strikeouts and no walks in a 10-1 victory.

On May 19, 2007, in a start against the New York Mets, Rasner was struck on the right hand by a ball hit by Endy Chávez, a former teammate with the Nationals. He fractured his right index finger and did not pitch in the major leagues again that season, though he pitched at several levels of the minor leagues on rehab assignments.

Rasner was not offered a new contract by the Yankees and became a free agent on December 12, 2007, but was re-signed a few days later on December 18 to a minor league deal.

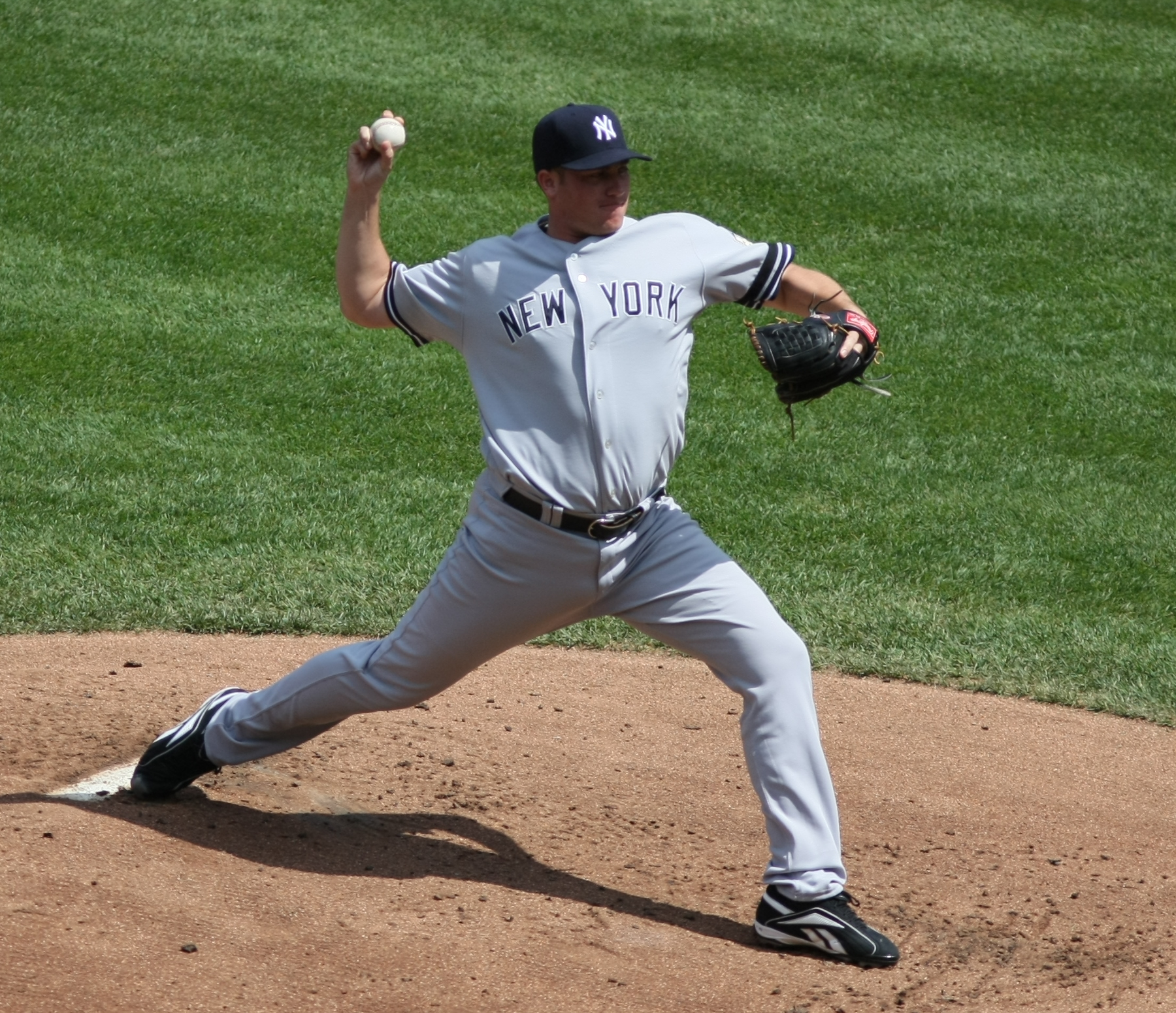
Rasner pitching for the New York Yankees on August 24, 2008.

On May 4, 2008, Rasner was recalled by the Yankees, and made his season debut against the Seattle Mariners. Rasner worked six innings, allowing only two runs and stayed in the Yankee rotation until September, when he was replaced by Alfredo Aceves.

==== Nippon Professional Baseball ====
On November 15, 2008, the Yankees sold Rasner to the Tohoku Rakuten Golden Eagles for $1 million. Rasner signed a two-year deal with the Golden Eagles. Rasner was traveling with his teammates on a shinkansen when he felt the 2011 Tōhoku earthquake. He played with the Golden Eagles for five years (2009-2013), the last three as a closer and setup man, before going down with an elbow injury that required Tommy John surgery.

He won the 2013 Japan Series championship as a member of the Rakuten Golden Eagles with former Yankees Andruw Jones and Casey McGehee. The team's ace was Masahiro Tanaka, who would sign with the New York Yankees in the 2013 offseason. After finishing his playing career, Rasner went on to become an international scout for the Eagles.
