= Mamoru Kishida =

Japanese baseball player (born 1981)

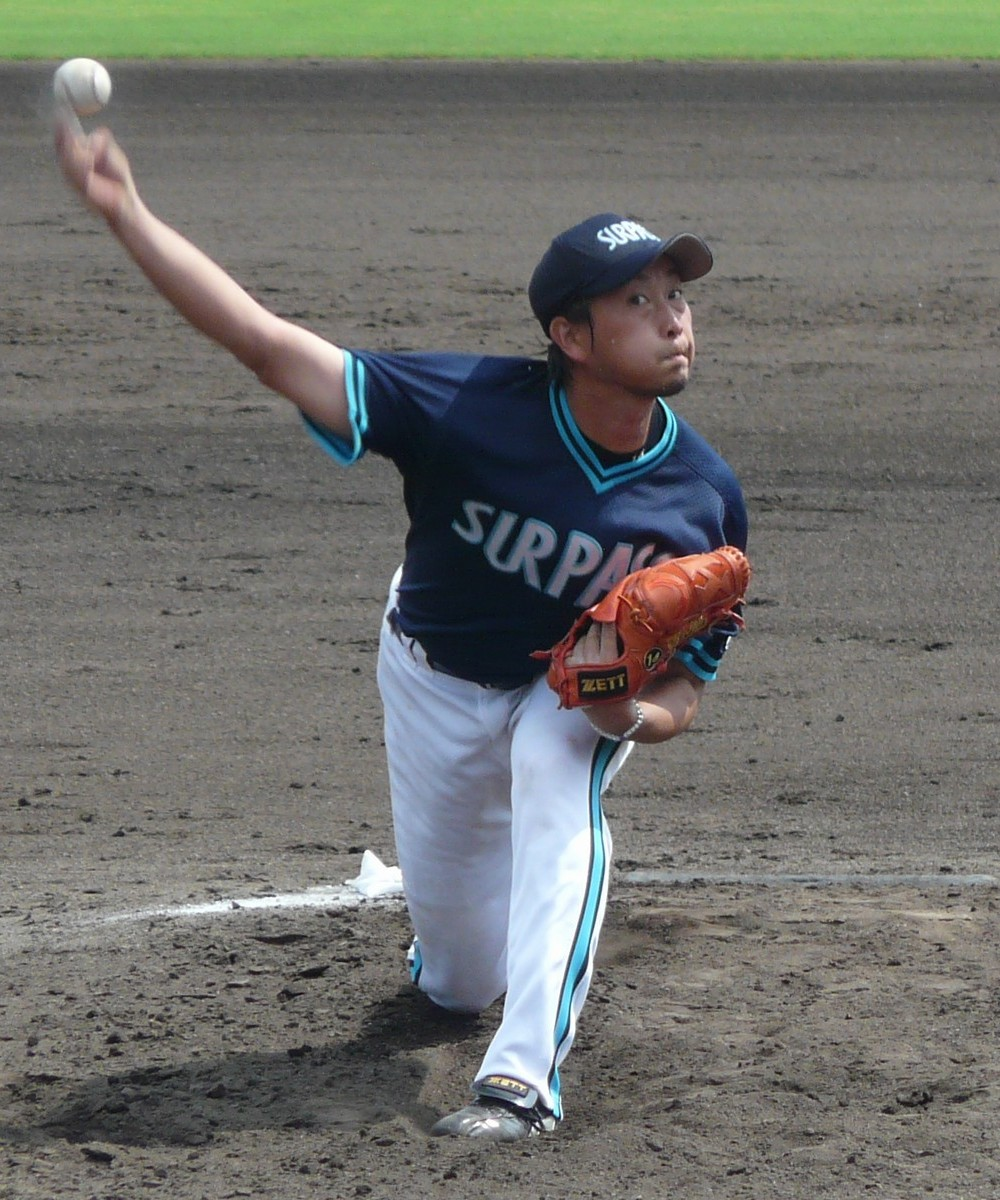
- Kishida with the Surpass

Orix Buffaloes – No. 71
- Pitcher / Coach / Manager
- Born: May 10, 1981 (age 45); Suita, Osaka, Japan
- Batted: Right Threw: Right

NPB debut
- May 30, 2006, for the Orix Buffaloes

Last NPB appearance
- September 29, 2019, for the Orix Buffaloes

NPB statistics
- Win–loss: 44–30
- ERA: 2.99
- Strikeouts: 730
- Saves: 63
- Holds: 63
- Stats at Baseball Reference

Teams
- As player: Orix Buffaloes (2006–2019); As coach: Orix Buffaloes (2020–2024); As manager: Orix Buffaloes (2025–present)
- Last updated on: 17 November 2024

Mamoru Kishida (岸田 護, Kishida Mamoru; born May 10, 1981) is a Japanese former professional baseball starting pitcher who currently serves as the manager for the Orix Buffaloes of Nippon Professional Baseball (NPB). He played in NPB for Orix from 2006 to 2019.

== Career ==
Kishida spent five seasons as the pitching coach for the Orix Buffaloes of Nippon Professional Baseball from 2020 to 2024. On October 9, 2024, it was announced that Kishida would be the new manager for the Buffaloes.
