= 2009 Nippon Professional Baseball season =

2009 NPB season
- League: Nippon Professional Baseball
- Sport: Baseball
- Duration: April 3 – November 7

Central League pennant
- League champions: Yomiuri Giants
- Runners-up: Chunichi Dragons
- Season MVP: Alex Ramírez (Yomiuri)

Pacific League pennant
- League champions: Hokkaido Nippon-Ham Fighters
- Runners-up: Tohoku Rakuten Golden Eagles
- Season MVP: Yu Darvish (Nippon Ham)

Climax Series
- CL champions: Yomiuri Giants
- CL runners-up: Chunichi Dragons
- PL champions: Hokkaido Nippon-Ham Fighters
- PL runners-up: Tohoku Rakuten Golden Eagles

Japan Series
- Venue: Sapporo Dome, Sapporo, Hokkaidō; Tokyo Dome, Bunkyō, Tokyo
- Champions: Yomiuri Giants
- Runners-up: Hokkaido Nippon-Ham Fighters
- Finals MVP: Shinnosuke Abe (Yomiuri)

NPB seasons
- ← 2008 2010 →

The 2009 Nippon Professional Baseball season was the 60th season since the NPB was reorganized in 1950

== Regular season standings ==
=== Central League ===
2009 Central League regular season standings
Team	Pld	W	L	T	PCT	GB
Yomiuri Giants	144	89	46	9	.649	—
Chunichi Dragons	144	81	62	1	.566	12
Tokyo Yakult Swallows	144	71	72	1	.497	22
Hanshin Tigers	144	67	73	4	.479	24.5
Hiroshima Carp	144	65	75	4	.465	26.5
Yokohama BayStars	144	51	93	0	.354	42.5

=== Pacific League ===
2009 Pacific League regular season standings
Pos	Team	Pld	W	L	T	GB	PCT	Home	Away
1	Hokkaido Nippon-Ham Fighters	144	82	60	2	—	.576	46–25–1	36–35–1
2	Tohoku Rakuten Golden Eagles	144	77	66	1	6.5	.538	39–32–1	38–34–0
3	Fukuoka SoftBank Hawks	144	74	65	5	3.5	.531	40–28–4	34–37–1
4	Saitama Seibu Lions	144	70	70	4	9	.500	38–32–2	32–38–2
5	Chiba Lotte Marines	144	62	77	5	15.5	.448	37–31–4	25–46–1
6	Orix Buffaloes	144	56	86	2	26	.396	32–40–0	24–46–2

== Climax Series ==
Note: All of the games that are played in the first two rounds of the Climax Series are held at the higher seed's home stadium. The team with the higher regular-season standing also advances if the round ends in a tie.

First stage
Central League
2	Chunichi Dragons	2
3	Tokyo Yakult Swallows	1
Pacific League
2	Tohoku Rakuten Golden Eagles	2
3	Fukuoka SoftBank Hawks	0

Final stage
1	Yomiuri Giants	4
2	Chunichi Dragons	1
1	Hokkaido Nippon-Ham Fighters	4
2	Tohoku Rakuten Golden Eagles	1

Japan Series
CL1	Yomiuri Giants	4
PL1	Hokkaido Nippon-Ham Fighters	2

=== Central League first stage ===
Chunichi Dragons win the series, 2-1

Game	Score	Date	Location	Attendance
1	Chunichi Dragons 2 – 3 Tokyo Yakult Swallows	October 17	Nagoya Dome	38,391
2	Chunichi Dragons 3 – 2 Tokyo Yakult Swallows	October 18	Nagoya Dome	38,171
3	Chunichi Dragons 7 – 4 Tokyo Yakult Swallows	October 19	Nagoya Dome	32,897

=== Central League second stage ===
Yomiuri Giants have one-win advantage

Game	Score	Date	Location	Attendance
1	Yomiuri Giants 2 – 7 Chunichi Dragons	October 21	Tokyo Dome	41,259
2	Yomiuri Giants 6 – 4 Chunichi Dragons	October 22	Tokyo Dome	40,452
3	Yomiuri Giants 5 – 4 Chunichi Dragons	October 23	Tokyo Dome	45,409
4	Yomiuri Giants 8 – 2 Chunichi Dragons	October 24	Tokyo Dome	46,535

Yomiuri Giants win the series, 4-1

=== Pacific League first stage ===
Tohoku Rakuten Golden Eagles win the series, 2-0

Game	Score	Date	Location	Attendance
1	Tohoku Rakuten Golden Eagles 11 – 4 Fukuoka SoftBank Hawks	October 16	Miyagi Baseball Stadium	21,303
2	Tohoku Rakuten Golden Eagles 4 – 1 Fukuoka SoftBank Hawks	October 17	Miyagi Baseball Stadium	21,388

=== Pacific League second stage ===
Hokkaido Nippon-Ham Fighters have one-win advantage

Game	Score	Date	Location	Attendance
1	Hokkaido Nippon-Ham Fighters 9 – 8 Tohoku Rakuten Golden Eagles	October 21	Sapporo Dome	38,235
2	Hokkaido Nippon-Ham Fighters 3 – 1 Tohoku Rakuten Golden Eagles	October 22	Sapporo Dome	32,713
3	Hokkaido Nippon-Ham Fighters 2 – 3 Tohoku Rakuten Golden Eagles	October 23	Sapporo Dome	42,328
4	Hokkaido Nippon-Ham Fighters 9 – 4 Tohoku Rakuten Golden Eagles	October 24	Sapporo Dome	42,328

Hokkaido Nippon-Ham Fighters win the series, 4-1

== Japan Series ==
CL Yomiuri Giants (4) vs. PL Hokkaido Nippon-Ham Fighters (2)

Game	Date	Score	Location	Time	Attendance
1	October 31	Yomiuri Giants 4 Hokkaido Nippon-Ham Fighters 3	Sapporo Dome	3:18	40,650
2	November 1	Yomiuri Giants 2 Hokkaido Nippon-Ham Fighters 4	Sapporo Dome	2:52	40,718
3	November 3	Hokkaido Nippon-Ham Fighters 4 Yomiuri Giants 7	Tokyo Dome	3:11	45,150
4	November 4	Hokkaido Nippon-Ham Fighters 8 Yomiuri Giants 4	Tokyo Dome	3:38	45,133
5	November 5	Hokkaido Nippon-Ham Fighters 2 Yomiuri Giants 3	Tokyo Dome	2:57	45,160
6	November 7	Yomiuri Giants 2 Hokkaido Nippon-Ham Fighters 0	Sapporo Dome	3:02	40,714

== See also ==
- 2009 Korea Professional Baseball season
- 2009 Major League Baseball season
