= Daisuke Kato (baseball) =

Japanese baseball player

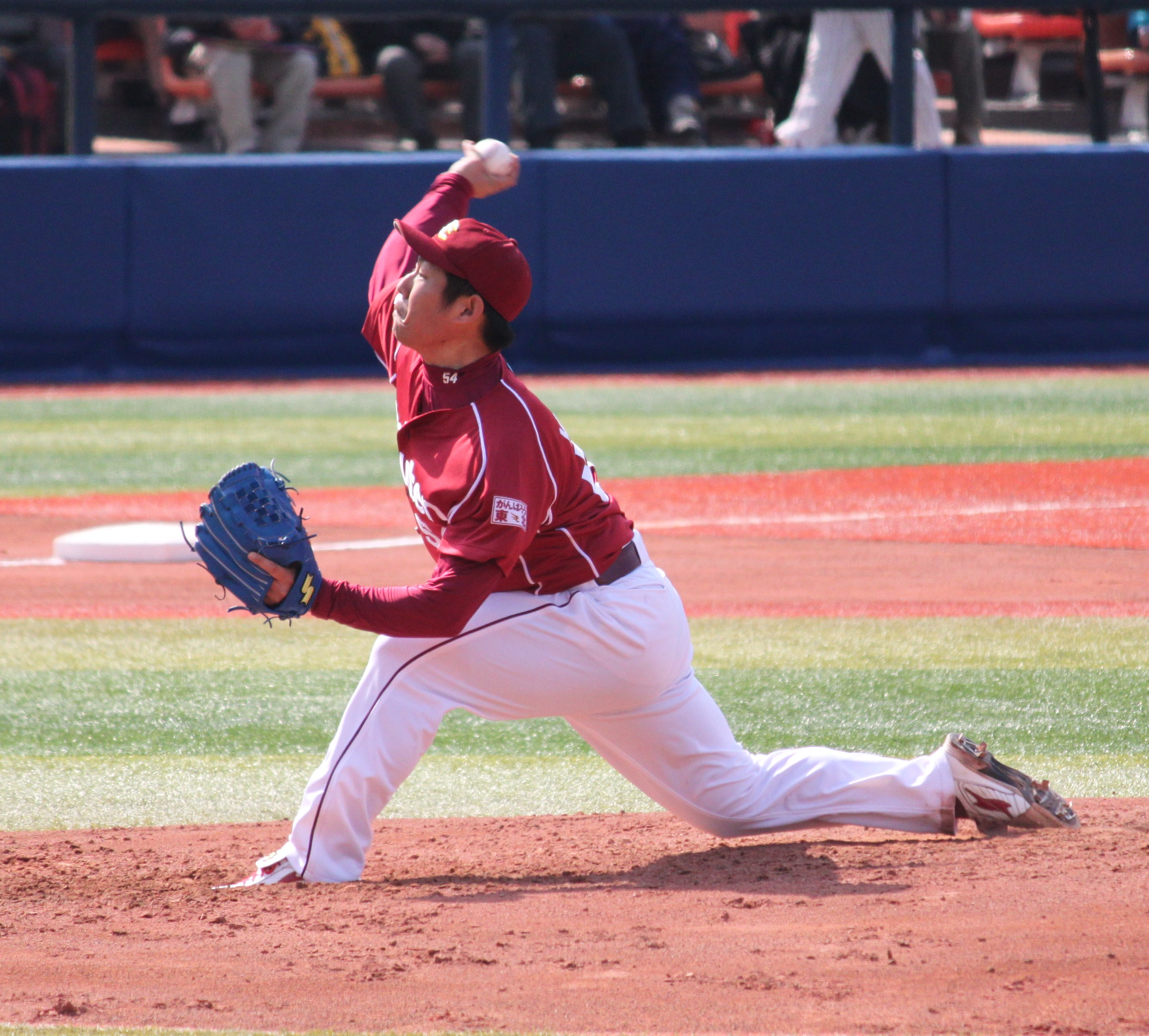
- Pitcher
- Born: July 27, 1980 (age 45); Fukuoka, Japan
- Batted: Right Threw: Right

NPB debut
- April 8, 2003, for the Orix BlueWave

Last appearance
- October 3, 2013, for the Tohoku Rakuten Golden Eagles

NPB statistics (through 2013)
- Win–loss record: 22–28
- Earned run average: 3.73
- Strikeouts: 446
- Saves: 87

Teams
- Orix BlueWave Orix Buffaloes (2003–2011); Tohoku Rakuten Golden Eagles (2012–2013)

Career highlights and awards
- 1× Pacific League Saves Champion (2008); 2× NPB All-Star (2007, 2008)

Daisuke Kato (加藤 大輔, Katō Daisuke; born July 27, 1980) is a former Nippon Professional Baseball pitcher for the Tohoku Rakuten Golden Eagles in Japan's Pacific League.
