= Yoshihiro Ito (baseball) =

Japanese baseball player (1982–2025)

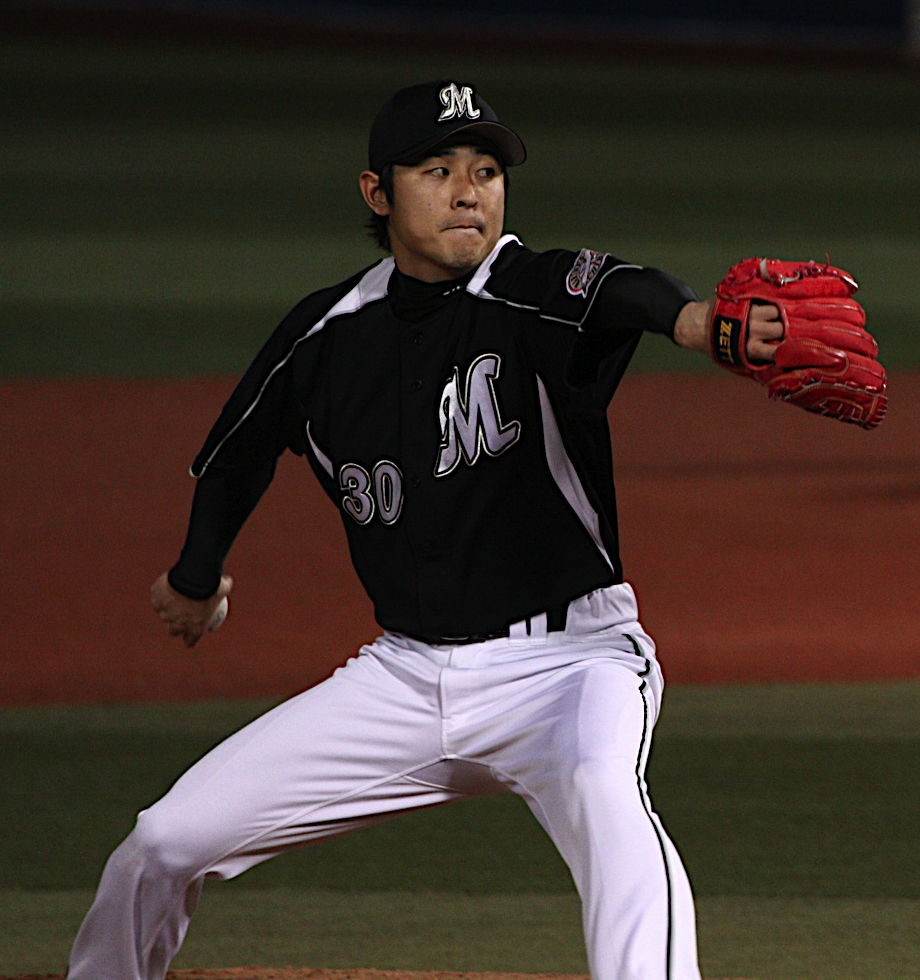
- Ito with the Chiba Lotte Marines in 2010
- Pitcher
- Born: June 2, 1982; Fukuoka, Japan
- Died: October 6, 2025 (aged 43); Fukuoka, Japan
- Batted: Right Threw: Right

NPB debut
- 2008, for the Chiba Lotte Marines

Last NPB appearance
- July 3, 2015, for the Chiba Lotte Marines

NPB statistics
- Win–loss record: 6–13
- Earned run average: 3.83
- Strikeouts: 249
- Stats at Baseball Reference

Teams
- Chiba Lotte Marines (2008–2015)

Career highlights and awards
- Japan Series champion (2010)

Yoshihiro Ito (伊藤 義弘, Ito Yoshihiro; June 2, 1982 – October 6, 2025) was a Japanese professional baseball pitcher. He played in Nippon Professional Baseball (NPB) from 2008 to 2015 for the Chiba Lotte Marines.

== Death ==
Ito died on October 6, 2025, at the age of 43, after the motorcycle he was riding collided with a taxi in Fukuoka. He was pronounced dead two hours later in the hospital.
