= Brian Sikorski =

American baseball player (born 1974)

- Pitcher
- Born: July 27, 1974 (age 52); Detroit, Michigan, U.S.
- Batted: Right Threw: Right

Professional debut
- MLB: August 16, 2000, for the Texas Rangers
- NPB: July 11, 2001, for the Chiba Lotte Marines

Last appearance
- MLB: September 29, 2006, for the Cleveland Indians
- NPB: May 1, 2011, for the Saitama Seibu Lions

MLB statistics
- Win–loss record: 4–5
- Earned run average: 5.40
- Strikeouts: 70

NPB statistics
- Win–loss record: 37–34
- Earned run average: 3.10
- Strikeouts: 598
- Stats at Baseball Reference

Teams
- Texas Rangers (2000); Chiba Lotte Marines (2001–2003); Yomiuri Giants (2004–2005); San Diego Padres (2006); Cleveland Indians (2006); Tokyo Yakult Swallows (2007); Chiba Lotte Marines (2008–2009); Saitama Seibu Lions (2010–2011)

Brian Patrick Sikorski (born July 27, 1974) is an American former professional baseball pitcher.

== Playing career ==
Although Sikorski made his MLB debut in 2000, he didn't play another game in the big leagues until 2006. He played professional baseball in Japan for five years, until 2005 for the Yomiuri Giants.

Sikorski played college baseball at Western Michigan University for the Broncos. He was named the Mid-American Conference Baseball Pitcher of the Year in 1995, an award he shared with Mike Nartker of Kent State. Sikorski was drafted in the fourth round of the 1995 amateur entry draft by the Houston Astros.

The Cleveland Indians acquired Sikorski in a trade July 18, 2006, by sending right-handed pitcher Mike Adams to the San Diego Padres. On May 17, 2007, Sikorski's contract was sold to the Tokyo Yakult Swallows. He signed to play for the Chiba Lotte Marines in 2008. After two more seasons with the Marines, Sikorski signed a contract with the Saitama Seibu Lions to be the team's closer in 2010. Securing the closer spot for the first time in his Japanese career, Sikorski responded, as of August 29, 2010, he leads the Pacific League in saves with 30, and he did not blow a save until August 20 against the Hokkaido Nippon-Ham Fighters. Until the 2010 season, Sikorski's record for saves was 15; this was broken on May 25 against the Hiroshima Toyo Carp.

Like many pitchers, Sikorski is known for his strict adherence to his pre-pitching routine. Two of his most noticeable routines are how he vigorously swings his right (pitching) arm in a windmill-style circle, both forwards and backwards before throwing his warmup pitches. Also, after getting the third out of the inning, he sprints off the mound and jumps over the foul line on the way to his team's dugout, resulting in him usually being the first one in.

== Post-playing career ==
In 2016, Sikorski was listed as a member of the Texas Rangers' professional scouting staff, based in Fraser, Michigan. After the 2019 season, he left the Rangers organization to become a scout for the Miami Marlins.

== Personal life ==
In 2018, his son, Easton, signed a national letter of intent to play baseball at Western Michigan.
