= Chihiro Kaneko =

Japanese baseball player

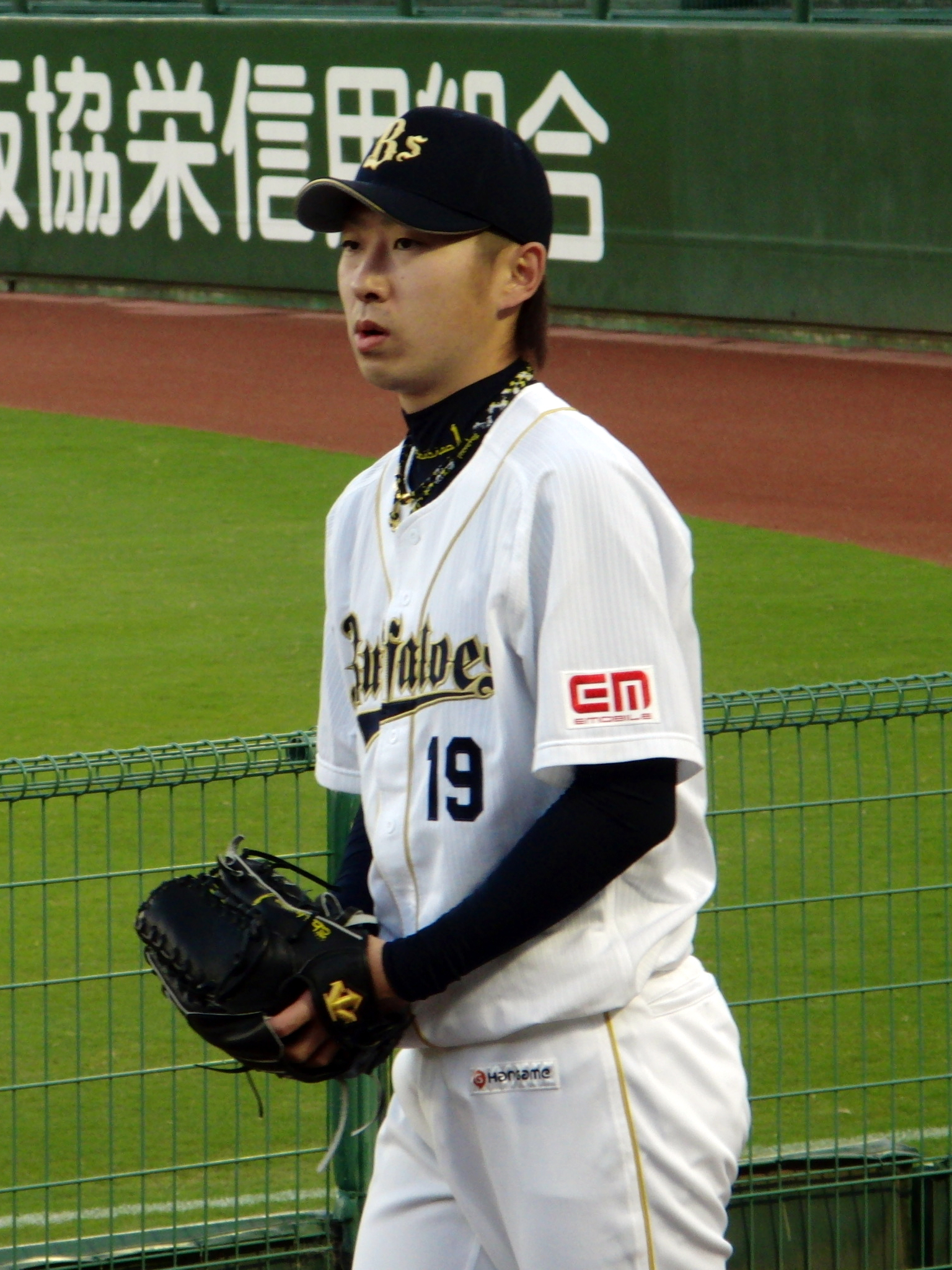
- Kaneko with the Orix Buffaloes

Hokkaido Nippon-Ham Fighters – No. 91
- Pitcher / Coach
- Born: November 8, 1983 (age 42); Sanjo, Niigata, Japan
- Batted: Left Threw: Right

NPB debut
- April 12, 2006, for the Orix Buffaloes

Last NPB appearance
- May 22, 2022, for the Hokkaido Nippon-Ham Fighters

Career statistics
- Win–loss record: 130-94
- Earned run average: 3.08
- Strikeouts: 1,721
- Stats at Baseball Reference

Teams
- As player: Orix Buffaloes (2005–2018); Hokkaido Nippon-Ham Fighters (2019–2022); As coach: Hokkaido Nippon-Ham Fighters (2024–present)

Career highlights and awards
- Pacific League MVP (2014); Eiji Sawamura Award (2014); 2× Pacific League Wins Champion (2010, 2014); Pacific League ERA Champion (2014); Pacific League Strikeout Champion (2013); Pacific League Best Nine Award (2014); Pacific League Golden Glove Award (2014); 3× NPB All-Star (2009, 2014, 2017)

Chihiro Kaneko (金子 千尋, Kaneko Chihiro; born November 8, 1983) is a Japanese former professional baseball pitcher. He played in Nippon Professional Baseball (NPB) for the Orix Buffaloes and Hokkaido Nippon-Ham Fighters.

== Career ==
Kaneko pitched for the Orix Buffaloes. He won the Pacific League Most Valuable Player Award and the Eiji Sawamura Award in 2014. He became a free agent after the 2018 season, and signed with the Hokkaido Nippon-Ham Fighters.

On October 19, 2019, Kaneko signed a 1-year extension to remain with the Fighters.
