= Tadahiro Ogino =

Japanese baseball player

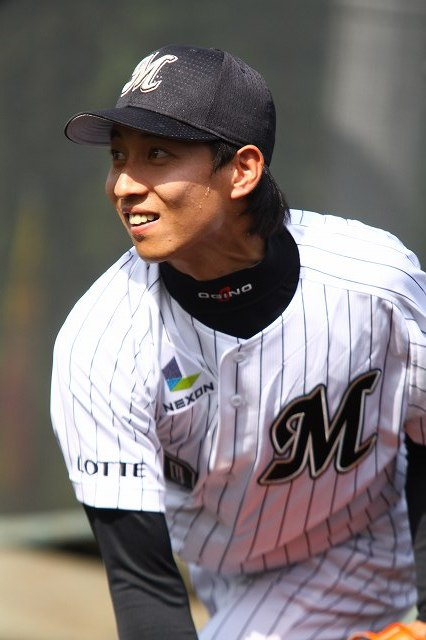
- Pitcher
- Born: April 26, 1982 (age 44); Tokyo, Japan
- Bats: Right Throws: Right

NPB debut
- April 17, 2007, for the Chiba Lotte Marines

NPB statistics (through 2008 season)
- Win–loss: 6–8
- ERA: 2.34
- Strikeouts: 76
- Stats at Baseball Reference

Teams
- Chiba Lotte Marines (2007 – 2014)
- Last updated on: December 20, 2013

Tadahiro Ogino (荻野 忠寛, Ogino Tadahiro; born April 26, 1982 in Tokyo, Japan) is a Japanese Nippon Professional Baseball with the Chiba Lotte Marines in Japan's Pacific League.
