= Shunsuke Watanabe =

Japanese baseball player (born 1976)

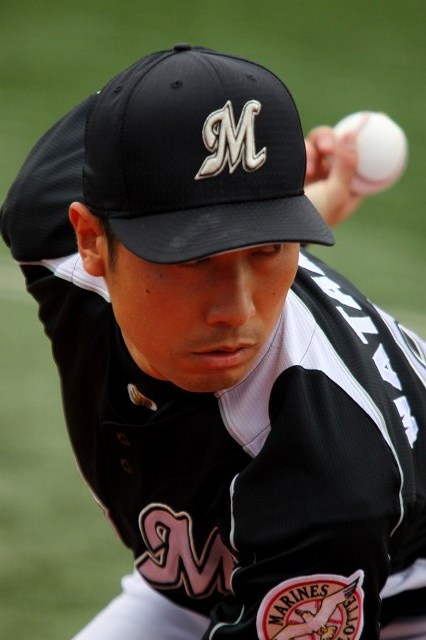
- Watanabe with the Chiba Lotte Marines
- Pitcher
- Born: August 27, 1976 (age 50); Tochigi, Japan
- Bats: Right Throws: Right

NPB debut
- April 25, 2001, for the Chiba Lotte Marines

NPB statistics
- Win–loss record: 87–77
- Earned run average: 3.64
- Strikeouts: 835
- Stats at Baseball Reference

Teams
- Chiba Lotte Marines (2001–2013)

Career highlights and awards
- 2× NPB All-Star (2004, 2005); 2x Japan Series champion (2005, 2010); Asia Series champion (2005)
Medals
Representing Japan
Men's baseball
World Baseball Classic
Gold medal – first place	2006 San Diego	Team
Gold medal – first place	2009 Los Angeles	Team

Shunsuke Watanabe (渡辺 俊介, Watanabe Shunsuke; born August 27, 1976) is a Japanese former professional baseball pitcher. He played in Nippon Professional Baseball (NPB) for the Chiba Lotte Marines from 2001 to 2013.

His submarine pitching form was noted during the 2006 World Baseball Classic.

== Amateur career ==
Watanabe began baseball at age 6, and began throwing underhanded during middle school at the suggestion of his father. Watanabe attracted little attention through high school and college, and joined the Kazusa Magic amateur baseball team in 1999 after graduating from college. He was finally noticed by professional scouts when he was chosen as a member of the 2000 Sydney Olympics Japanese national team, where he marked a win in a game against Italy.

He pitched in the Japanese national amateur baseball tournament in late 2000 and was drafted in the 4th round by the Chiba Lotte Marines that year.

== Professional career ==
=== Chiba Lotte Marines ===
Watanabe made his debut in April 2001, starting a game against the Orix BlueWave. He won his first professional game with a complete-game shutout, and ended the season with 2 wins. In 2002, he pitched in 6 games and had a record of 0–3. In 2003, he gave up 8 runs in his first start, and became a part of the starting rotation at the middle of the year, going 9–4 with a 3.66 ERA. He won 12 games the following year, won 15 games in 2005 with a 2.17 ERA. The Marines won their first championship in 31 years in 2005, and Watanabe pitched in the second game of the Japanese championship series against the Hanshin Tigers, giving up 4 hits in a shutout victory.

He was chosen as a member of the World Baseball Classic team in 2006, but pitched poorly during the season, ending up with a 5–11 record, and a 4.35 ERA. He also led the league in hit batsmen (14).

He holds the Japanese record for skipping stones, recorded on a show on Nippon Television. Chiba Lotte Marines manager Bobby Valentine made an appearance on the show as well.

On November 6, 2004 David Ortiz of the Boston Red Sox hit a 525-foot home run off Watanabe when the United States Major League Baseball team faced the Nippon Professional Baseball team in the second game of the traditional Japan All-Star Series. This blast by "Big Papi" has been recorded as the longest home run ever hit at the Tokyo Dome.

Watanabe was released by Lotte on November 4, 2013.

=== Lancaster Barnstormers ===
Shunsuke Watanabe pitching for the Lancaster Barnstormers on September 13, 2015 in Bridgewater, NJ

On December 13, 2013, Watanabe signed a minor league contract with Major League Baseball's Boston Red Sox. He was released by the Red Sox on March 30, 2014.

On April 14, 2014, Watanabe signed with the Lancaster Barnstormers of the Atlantic League of Professional Baseball. He made 39 appearances (16 starts) for the Barnstormers, posting an 8-2 record and 3.37 ERA with 91 strikeouts and one save across 120 1/3 innings pitched.

Watanabe returned to Lancaster for the 2015 season, compiling a 7-5 record and 2.94 ERA with 75 strikeouts in 110 1/3 innings pitched across 21 games (18 starts).

== Pitching style ==
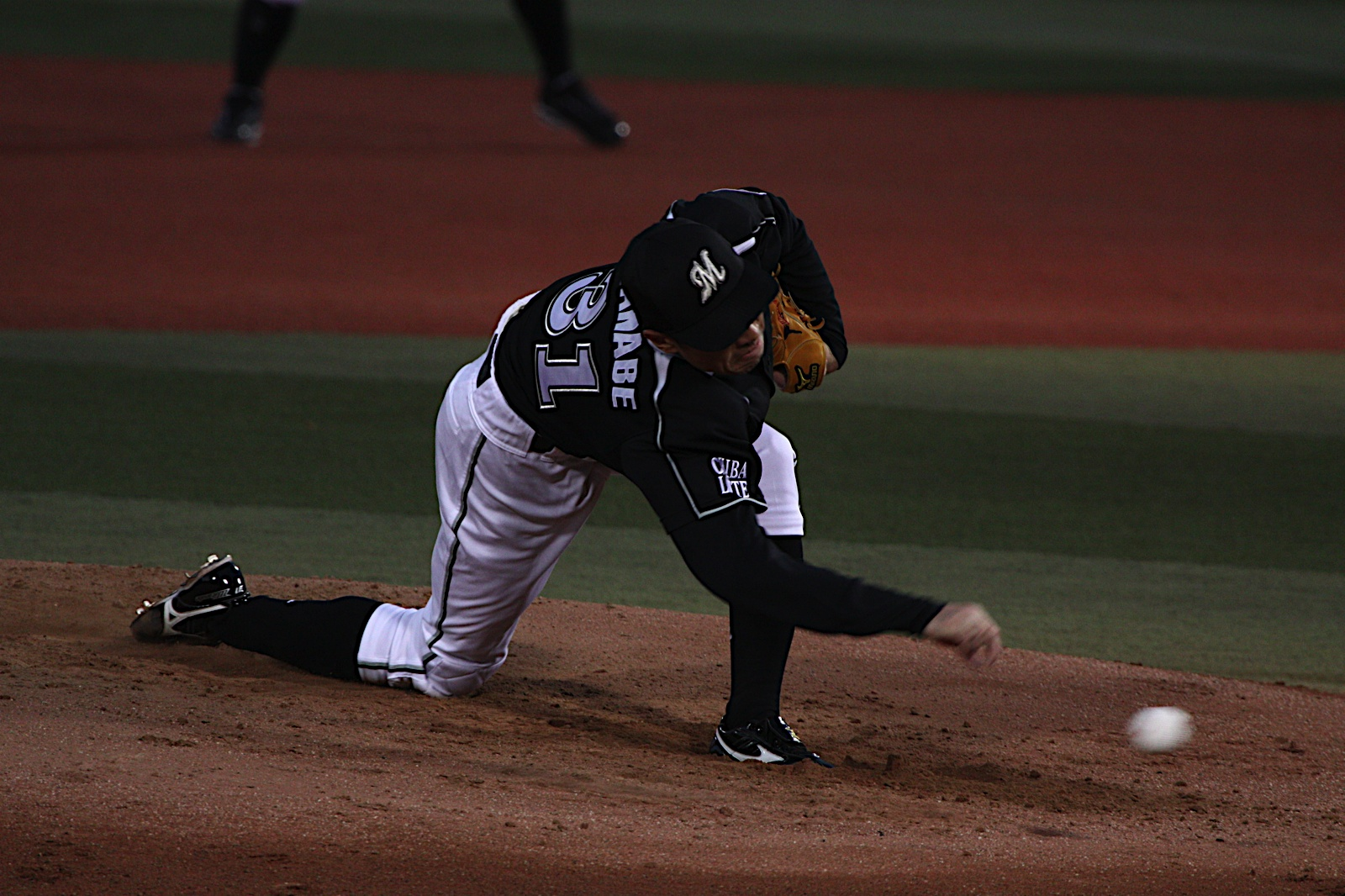
Watanabe's famous pitching style during a game in 2010

Watanabe was known for having the world's lowest release point, letting go of the ball only about 2 inches above the ground, and his hand sometimes brushes against the ground as he throws. His body is much closer to the ground than other submarine pitchers, and his right knee has bled during games because it skids against the mound. He put a pad on the inside of his uniform around the knee to prevent himself from bleeding. Watanabe's form is truly one of a kind, as there is no other pitcher in the world who throws from the same arm angle. Batters have trouble timing their swings against Watanabe, because his pitches seemed to come in at completely different speeds compared to those of conventional pitchers.

Watanabe relied on his distinct pitching form and timing to get batters out. In addition to changing speeds with his pitches, he sometimes changed the time he took to windup and release the ball. He did not have precise control, but was consistent in the lower part of the strike zone. Watanabe was not known to strike out batters, (only 101 strikeouts in 187 innings in 2005) and relied on forcing batters to hit themselves into outs. His underhanded form required less energy than a conventional pitching form, and he was able to pitch into later innings.

Watanabe threw four main pitches; a fastball, sinker, gyroball, and a slider. Being a submarine pitcher, Watanabe's fastball was slow, sitting in mid to high-70s mph and topping out at low-80s mph, with movements. The sinker was probably his best pitch, as he fooled batters by throwing it at the same speed as his fastball, or sometimes even faster. His slider was about 8–9 mph slower than his fastball, and breaks downward. Watanabe's gyroball was very slow, clocking around 60 mph, somewhat similar to the curveball of Washington Nationals pitcher Liván Hernández (which actually was more like an eephus pitch). He often experimented with the gyroball, changing grips to make it resemble a change-up more than a gyroball. Watanabe's gyroball (thought to be a slow non-breaking curveball) was held with a two-seam grip. Watanabe's control over the gyroball was below average, but he did get looking strikes and groundballs with it.

== See also ==
- World Baseball Classic
- List of Japanese baseball players
