= Shingo Ono =

Japanese baseball player

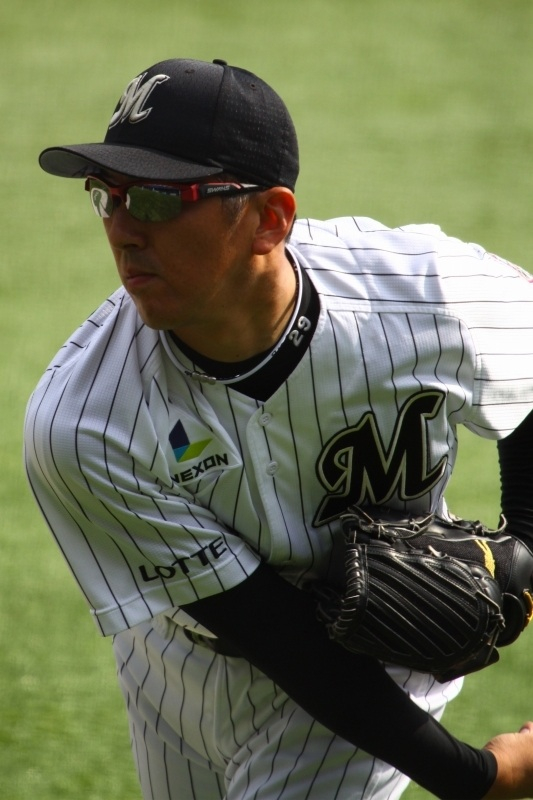

Chiba Lotte Marines – No. 82
- Pitcher/Coach
- Born: April 7, 1975 (age 50); Shizuoka, Japan
- Bats: Right Throws: Right

debut
- October 10, 1997, for the Chiba Lotte Marines

Teams
- As player: Chiba Lotte Marines (1994 – 2013); As coach: Chiba Lotte Marines (2016 – present)

Shingo Ono (小野 晋吾, Ono Shingo; born April 7, 1975 in Nagaizumi, Shizuoka, Japan) is a Nippon Professional Baseball pitcher for the Chiba Lotte Marines in Japan's Pacific League.
