= Kazuki Kondoh =

Japanese baseball player

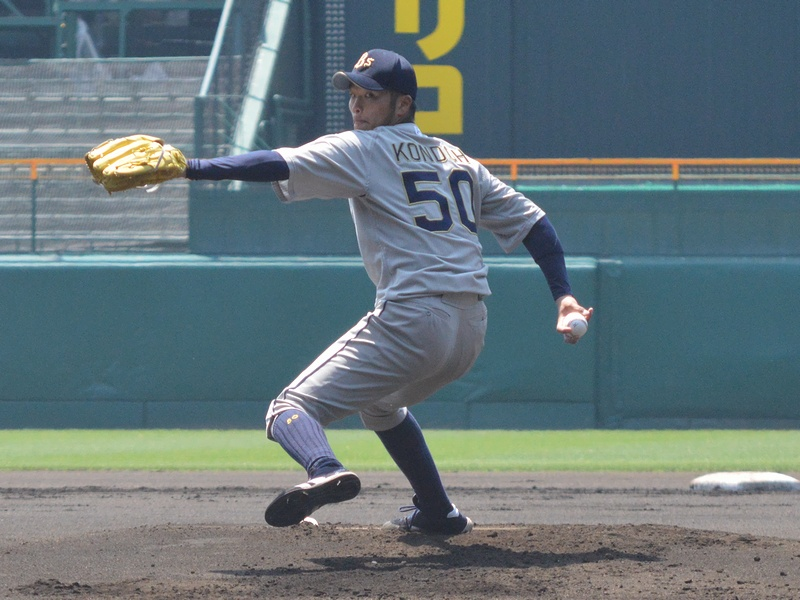
- Kondoh with the Orix Buffaloes

Kagawa Olive Guyners – No. 65
- Pitcher / Coach
- Born: July 8, 1983 (age 43); Sagamihara, Kanagawa Prefecture
- Bats: Right Throws: Right

NPB debut
- October 7, 2003, for the Osaka Kintetsu Buffaloes

NPB statistics (through 2020 season)
- Win–loss: 43–57
- ERA: 4.50
- Strikeouts: 657
- Saves: 4
- Holds: 71
- Stats at Baseball Reference

Teams
- Osaka Kintetsu Buffaloes (2002–2004); Orix Buffaloes (2005–2016); Tokyo Yakult Swallows (2016–2020)

Career highlights and awards
- Central League Most Valuable Setup Pitcher (2018)

Kazuki Kondoh (近藤 一樹, born July 8, 1983) is a Japanese professional baseball pitcher for the Kagawa Olive Guyners of the Shikoku Island League Plus. He has played in Nippon Professional Baseball (NPB) for the Osaka Kintetsu Buffaloes, Orix Buffaloes and Tokyo Yakult Swallows.

== Career ==
Osaka Kintetsu Buffaloes selected Kondoh with the seventh selection in the 2001 NPB draft.

On December 2, 2020, he became free agent.

On January 4, 2021, Kondoh signed with Kagawa Olive Guyners of the Shikoku Island League Plus, as a player-coach.
