= Chikara Onodera =

Japanese baseball player (born 1980)

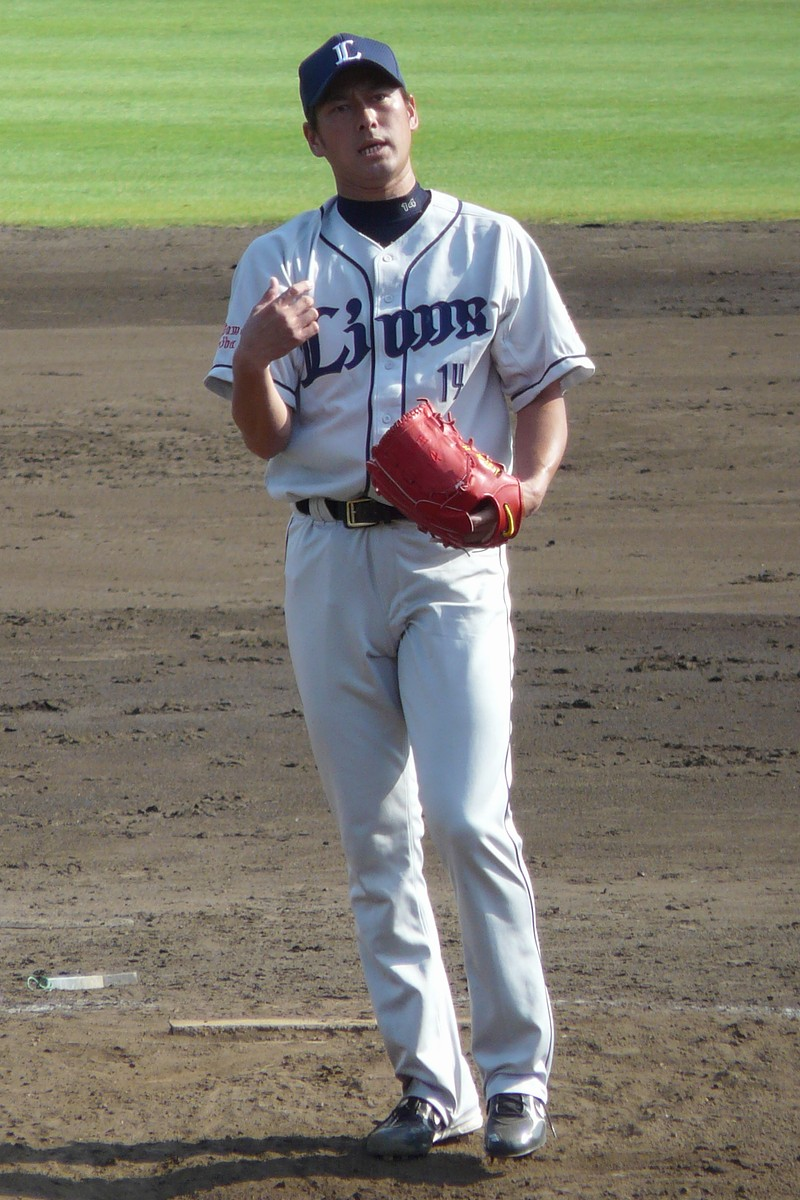

Tohoku Rakuten Golden Eagles – No. 92
- Pitcher / Coach
- Born: November 26, 1980 (age 45)
- Batted: Right Threw: Right

NPB debut
- August 27, 2003, for the Seibu Lions

Last NPB appearance
- May 28, 2012, for the Tokyo Yakult Swallows

NPB statistics
- Win–loss record: 23-24
- Earned run average: 4.05
- Strikeouts: 272
- Stats at Baseball Reference

Teams
- As player: Seibu Lions / Saitama Seibu Lions (2003–2011); Tokyo Yakult Swallows (2011–2012); As coach: Saitama Seibu Lions (2016); Tokyo Yakult Swallows (2017–2025); Tohoku Rakuten Golden Eagles (2026-present)

Chikara Onodera (小野寺 力, Onodera Chikara; born November 26, 1980) is a Japanese former professional baseball closing pitcher. He played in Nippon Professional Baseball (NPB) for the Seibu Lions / Saitama Seibu Lions and Tokyo Yakult Swallows from 2003 to 2012. On the Lions he was a peer and teammate to Daisuke Matsuzaka.
