= 2009 Hokkaido Nippon-Ham Fighters season =

2009 Hokkaido Nippon-Ham Fighters
- Pacific League champions
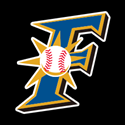
- League: Pacific League
- Ballpark: Sapporo Dome
- Record: 82–60–2 (.577)
- League place: 1st
- Parent company: Nippon Ham
- President: Junichi Fujii
- Manager: Masataka Nashida
- Captain: Atsunori Inaba

The 2009 Hokkaido Nippon-Ham Fighters season was the 64th season for the Hokkaido Nippon-Ham Fighters franchise.

== Regular season ==
=== Standings ===
2009 Pacific League regular season standings
Pos	Team	Pld	W	L	T	GB	PCT	Home	Away
**1**	Hokkaido Nippon-Ham Fighters	**144**	**82**	**60**	**2**	—	.576	**46–25–1**	**36–35–1**
2	Tohoku Rakuten Golden Eagles	144	77	66	1	6.5	.538	39–32–1	38–34–0
3	Fukuoka SoftBank Hawks	144	74	65	5	3.5	.531	40–28–4	34–37–1
4	Saitama Seibu Lions	144	70	70	4	9	.500	38–32–2	32–38–2
5	Chiba Lotte Marines	144	62	77	5	15.5	.448	37–31–4	25–46–1
6	Orix Buffaloes	144	56	86	2	26	.396	32–40–0	24–46–2

=== Record vs. opponents ===
**Pacific League**
Chiba Lotte Marines	18–6–1
Fukuoka SoftBank Hawks	11–12–1
Orix Buffaloes	16–8–0
Saitama Seibu Lions	12–12–0
Tohoku Rakuten Golden Eagles	13–11–0
**Central League**
Chunichi Dragons	1–3–0
Hanshin Tigers	2–1–1
Hiroshima Toyo Carp	2–2–0
Tokyo Yakult Swallows	2–2–0
Yokohama BayStars	3–1–0
Yomiuri Giants	2–2–0
Interleague total	12–11–1
**Total**	**82–60–2**

=== Game log ===
Legend
	Fighters win
	Fighters loss
	Fighters tie
	Postponement
**Bold**	Fighters team member

2009 Game Log
April

#	Date	Opponent	Score	Win	Loss	Save	Attendance	Record
1	April 3	Eagles	3–1	Iwakuma (1–0)	**Darvish** (0–1)	Arime (1)	42,328	0–1–0
2	April 4	Eagles	6–5	Gwyn (1–0)	**Fujii** (0–1)	Kawagishi (1)	36,316	0–2–0
3	April 5	Eagles	9–6 (11)	Kawagishi (1–0)	**Sakamoto** (0–1)		34,252	0–3–0
4	April 7	Marines	1–9	**Tadano** (1–0)	Karakawa (0–1)		17,568	1–3–0
5	April 8	Marines	7–8	**Tateyama** (1–0)	Sikorski (1–1)	**H. Takeda** (1)	18,853	2–3–0
6	April 10	@ Hawks	9–1	**Darvish** (1–1)	Wada (1–1)		26,940	3–3–0
7	April 11	@ Hawks	9–0	**Fujii** (1–1)	Takahashi (0–1)		28,306	4–3–0
8	April 12	@ Hawks	4–5	Sugiuchi (1–0)	**Sweeney** (0–1)	Mahara (1)	28,296	4–4–0
9	April 14	Buffaloes	8–7	Kaneko (1–1)	**Tadano** (1–1)	Kato (4)	17,548	4–5–0
10	April 15	Buffaloes	5–11	**Kikuchi** (1–0)	Motoyanagi (0–1)		17,579	5–5–0
11	April 16	Buffaloes	1–7	**M. Takeda** (1–0)	Nakayama (0–1)		20,702	6–5–0
12	April 17	@ Lions	4–2	**Darvish** (2–1)	Wakui (2–1)	**H. Takeda** (2)	15,181	7–5–0
13	April 18	@ Lions	6–4	**Tanimoto** (1–0)	Shotsu (0–1)	**H. Takeda** (3)	28,525	8–5–0
14	April 19	@ Lions	8–6	**Miyanishi** (1–0)	Onodera (1–1)	**H. Takeda** (4)	22,315	9–5–0
15	April 21	Hawks	10–5	Kamiuchi (2–0)	**Tadano** (1–2)		17,486	9–6–0
16	April 22	Hawks	3–2	Houlton (2–0)	**Tateyama** (1–1)	Mahara (3)	19,138	9–7–0
17	April 23	Hawks	6–7	**Miyanishi** (2–0)	Settsu (0–2)		18,364	10–7–0
18	April 24	@ Buffaloes	11–0	**Darvish** (3–1)	Komatsu (0–2)		18,724	11–7–0
—	April 25	@ Buffaloes	Game postponed due to rain					
19	April 26	@ Buffaloes	3–11	Kishida (3–0)	**Sakakibara** (0–1)		13,223	11–8–0
20	April 28	@ Eagles	4–2	**Yagi** (1–0)	Kawai (0–1)	**H. Takeda** (5)	13,326	12–8–0
21	April 29	@ Eagles	1–2	Tanaka (4–0)	**M. Takeda** (1–1)		20,381	12–9–0
22	April 30	@ Eagles	2–4	Hasebe (1–2)	**Sweeney** (0–2)	Arime (2)	11,239	12–10–0

May

#	Date	Opponent	Score	Win	Loss	Save	Attendance	Record
23	May 1	Lions	2–1 (12)	Onuma (1–1)	**Tateyama** (1–2)	Nogami (1)	28,007	12–11–0
24	May 2	Lions	6–7 (11)	**H. Takeda** (1–0)	Nogami (0–1)		34,711	13–11–0
25	May 3	Lions	5–6 (12)	**Tanimoto** (2–0)	Onodera (1–2)		40,754	14–11–0
26	May 4	@ Marines	10–7	**Tadano** (2–2)	Omine (1–1)	**H. Takeda** (6)	30,058	15–11–0
27	May 5	@ Marines	2–0 (5)	**Yagi** (2–0)	Kobayashi (0–3)		22,726	16–11–0
28	May 6	@ Marines	3–7	Watanabe (1–3)	**Sweeney** (0–3)		23,139	16–12–0
29	May 8	Buffaloes	1–10	**Darvish** (4–1)	Nakayama (0–3)		26,638	17–12–0
30	May 9	Buffaloes	2–3	**Fujii** (2–1)	Komatsu (0–4)	**H. Takeda** (7)	26,308	18–12–0
31	May 10	Buffaloes	2–7	**M. Takeda** (2–1)	Yoshino (0–1)		28,156	19–12–0
32	May 12	@ Eagles	8–1	**Yagi** (3–0)	Isaka (1–1)		10,231	20–12–0
33	May 13	@ Eagles	3–7	Tanaka (5–0)	**Sakamoto** (0–2)		13,983	20–13–0
34	May 14	@ Eagles	7–0	**Sweeney** (1–3)	Hasebe (2–3)		10,677	21–13–0
35	May 15	@ Buffaloes	4–2	**Darvish** (5–1)	Nakayama (0–4)	**H. Takeda** (8)	11,405	22–13–0
36	May 16	@ Buffaloes	7–3	**Fujii** (3–1)	Komatsu (0–5)	**H. Takeda** (9)	21,965	23–13–0
37	May 17	@ Buffaloes	0–6	Mitsuhara (1–0)	**M. Takeda** (2–2)		19,467	23–14–0
38	May 19	Giants	6–16	**Yagi** (4–0)	Takahashi (2–1)		33,050	24–14–0
39	May 20	Giants	5–6	**Hayashi** (1–0)	Greisinger (5–3)	**H. Takeda** (10)	33,602	25–14–0
40	May 22	Swallows	3–2	Tateyama (5–0)	**Fujii** (3–2)	Lim (14)	20,932	25–15–0
41	May 23	Swallows	0–3	**Darvish** (6–1)	Barrett (0–1)		31,288	26–15–0
42	May 24	@ Dragons	0–1	Kawai (3–0)	**M. Takeda** (2–3)	Iwase (11)	31,711	26–16–0
43	May 25	@ Dragons	4–10	Asakura (5–2)	**Itokazu** (0–1)		29,051	26–17–0
44	May 27	@ BayStars	4–5	Kizuka (1–0)	**Kikuchi** (1–1)	Yamaguchi (3)	13,062	26–18–0
—	May 28	@ BayStars	Game postponed due to rain					
45	May 29	@ BayStars	7–1	**Fujii** (4–2)	Miura (5–3)		7,349	27–18–0
46	May 30	Tigers	2–8	**Darvish** (7–1)	Fukuhara (2–4)		42,328	28–18–0
47	May 31	Tigers	4–4 (12)	Game tied after 12 innings			42,051	28–18–1

June

#	Date	Opponent	Score	Win	Loss	Save	Attendance	Record
48	June 2	Carp	2–1	Maeda (4–5)	**Itokazu** (0–2)	Nagakawa (17)	20,252	28–19–1
49	June 3	Carp	2–7	**Tateyama** (2–2)	Yokoyama (1–3)		22,257	29–19–1
50	June 5	@ Giants	2–5	Gonzalez (6–0)	**Fujii** (4–3)	Kroon (9)	44,242	29–20–1
51	June 6	@ Giants	2–3	Utsumi (2–3)	**Darvish** (7–2)	Kroon (10)	44,887	29–21–1
52	June 7	@ Swallows	3–0	**M. Takeda** (3–3)	Kawashima (4–4)	**H. Takeda** (11)	20,032	30–21–1
53	June 8	@ Swallows	3–4	Lim (1–0)	**Tateyama** (2–3)		12,515	30–22–1
54	June 10	BayStars	3–5	**Miyanishi** (3–0)	Walrond (3–5)	**H. Takeda** (12)	10,977	31–22–1
55	June 11	BayStars	3–9	**Sweeney** (2–3)	Oyamada (0–1)		22,582	32–22–1
56	June 13	Dragons	1–9	**Darvish** (8–2)	Yamamoto (0–2)		35,699	33–22–1
57	June 14	Dragons	11–10	Kawai (5–0)	**Itokazu** (0–3)	Iwase (15)	33,086	33–23–1
58	June 16	@ Tigers	3–4	Kubo (2–4)	**M. Takeda** (3–4)	Fujikawa (6)	21,310	33–24–1
59	June 17	@ Tigers	10–5	**Yagi** (5–0)	Shimoyanagi (5–4)		23,543	34–24–1
60	June 20	@ Carp	5–1	**Darvish** (9–2)	Saito (4–5)		30,993	35–24–1
61	June 21	@ Carp	5–7	Maeda (5–5)	**M. Takeda** (3–5)	Nagakawa (20)	30,486	35–25–1
62	June 26	@ Marines	5–0	**Darvish** (10–2)	Kobayashi (1–5)		28,367	36–25–1
63	June 27	@ Marines	5–4	**Yagi** (6–0)	Karakawa (4–4)	**H. Takeda** (13)	23,513	37–25–1
64	June 28	@ Marines	2–3 (7)	Ono (4–4)	**Sweeney** (2–4)		18,184	37–26–1
65	June 30	Eagles	1–3	**Itokazu** (1–3)	Hasebe (4–6)	**H. Takeda** (14)	23,248	38–26–1

July

#	Date	Opponent	Score	Win	Loss	Save	Attendance	Record
66	July 1	Eagles	5–10	**M. Takeda** (4–5)	Fujiwara (0–2)		23,374	39–26–1
67	July 2	Eagles	3–6	**Hayashi** (2–0)	Arime (0–1)	**H. Takeda** (15)	25,442	40–26–1
68	July 4	Hawks	7–3	Sugiuchi (9–1)	**Yagi** (6–1)		18,086	40–27–1
69	July 5	Hawks	3–2	Houlton (6–3)	**Sweeney** (2–5)	Mahara (14)	18,660	40–28–1
70	July 7	@ Lions	4–6	Kishi (9–1)	**Itokazu** (1–4)		12,525	40–29–1
71	July 8	@ Lions	3–4	Iwasaki (2–0)	**Darvish** (10–3)	Onodera (10)	12,525	40–30–1
72	July 9	@ Lions	2–8	Wakui (10–3)	**M. Takeda** (4–6)		12,625	40–31–1
73	July 10	Marines	0–4	**Tadano** (3–2)	Kobayashi (1–7)		25,690	41–31–1
74	July 11	Marines	5–6	**Ejiri** (1–0)	Kawasaki (1–1)	**H. Takeda** (16)	37,116	42–31–1
75	July 12	Marines	6–7 (12)	**Miyanishi** (4–0)	Ito (2–2)		34,764	43–31–1
76	July 14	@ Hawks	1–2	Otonari (4–4)	**Fujii** (4–4)	Mahara (16)	31,262	43–32–1
77	July 15	@ Hawks	9–1	**Darvish** (11–3)	Fujioka (3–4)		33,031	44–32–1
78	July 16	@ Hawks	3–2	**Kikuchi** (2–1)	Sugiuchi (9–2)	**H. Takeda** (17)	33,549	45–32–1
—	July 18	Lions	Game postponed due to rain					
—	July 19	Lions	Game postponed due to rain					
79	July 20	Marines	3–4	**Fujii** (5–4)	Omine (2–5)	**H. Takeda** (18)	22,004	46–32–1
80	July 21	Marines	3–7	**Tadano** (4–2)	Matsumoto (0–1)		18,742	47–32–1
81	July 22	Marines	1–2	**Darvish** (12–3)	Naruse (4–5)		23,547	48–32–1
All-Star Break: CL and PL split series, 1–1
82	July 28	@ Marines	5–1	**Yagi** (7–1)	Kobayashi (2–8)		24,558	49–32–1
83	July 29	@ Marines	6–5	**Ejiri** (2–0)	Sikorski (5–5)	**H. Takeda** (19)	17,878	50–32–1
84	July 30	@ Marines	7–6	**Miyanishi** (5–0)	Ogino (2–2)	**H. Takeda** (20)	15,137	51–32–1
85	July 31	Hawks	1–5	**Darvish** (13–3)	Germano (4–2)		29,525	52–32–1

August

#	Date	Opponent	Score	Win	Loss	Save	Attendance	Record
86	August 1	Hawks	2–1	Houlton (8–4)	**Tateyama** (2–4)	Mahara (21)	33,543	52–33–1
87	August 2	Hawks	1–7	**M. Takeda** (5–6)	Sugiuchi (9–3)		35,639	53–33–1
88	August 4	@ Lions	5–1	**Yagi** (8–1)	Wakui (12–4)		20,473	54–33–1
89	August 5	@ Lions	2–5	Ishii (5–7)	**Kikuchi** (2–2)	Onodera (16)	18,510	54–34–1
90	August 6	@ Lions	7–4	**Tateyama** (3–4)	Iwasaki (2–4)	**H. Takeda** (21)	19,360	55–34–1
91	August 7	@ Eagles	1–3	Tanaka (9–4)	**Darvish** (13–4)	Gwyn (4)	20,226	55–35–1
92	August 8	@ Eagles	8–6	**Fujii** (6–4)	Nagai (7–5)	**H. Takeda** (22)	20,542	56–35–1
93	August 9	@ Eagles	4–1	**M. Takeda** (6–6)	Hasebe (4–6)	**H. Takeda** (23)	16,077	57–35–1
94	August 11	Buffaloes	3–4 (12)	**Hayashi** (3–0)	Okubo (2–1)		20,013	58–35–1
95	August 12	Buffaloes	8–2	Kondo (6–7)	**Sunaga** (2–1)		21,884	58–36–1
96	August 13	Buffaloes	4–8	**Sweeney** (3–5)	Hirano (2–8)		33,823	59–36–1
97	August 14	Lions	2–3	**Darvish** (14–4)	Onuma (2–4)	**H. Takeda** (24)	34,095	60–36–1
98	August 15	Lions	0–2	**Kikuchi** (3–2)	Kishi (11–2)	**H. Takeda** (25)	33,567	61–36–1
99	August 16	Lions	6–7 (10)	**Miyanishi** (6–0)	Onodera (2–5)		30,399	62–36–1
100	August 18	Eagles	6–3	Iwakuma (10–5)	**Yagi** (8–2)		15,105	62–37–1
—	August 19	Eagles	Game postponed due to rain					
101	August 20	Eagles	4–1	Nagai (8–6)	**Tadano** (4–3)	Fukumori (3)	24,010	62–38–1
102	August 21	@ Hawks	2–6	Otonari (6–7)	**Darvish** (14–5)		34,374	62–39–1
103	August 22	@ Hawks	3–4	Houlton (9–6)	**Ejiri** (2–1)	Mahara (26)	32,511	62–40–1
104	August 23	@ Hawks	1–3	Sugiuchi (12–3)	**M. Takeda** (6–7)		33,648	62–41–1
105	August 25	@ Buffaloes	10–11 (10)	Shimizu (1–2)	**Tateyama** (3–5)		12,381	62–42–1
106	August 26	@ Buffaloes	6–2	**Itokazu** (2–4)	Kondo (7–8)		20,360	63–42–1
107	August 27	@ Buffaloes	3–1	**Tadano** (5–3)	Hirano (2–10)	**H. Takeda** (26)	9,412	64–42–1
108	August 28	Hawks	1–3	**Miyanishi** (7–0)	Otonari (6–8)	**H. Takeda** (27)	23,402	65–42–1
109	August 29	Hawks	3–5	**Kikuchi** (4–2)	Mise (0–1)	**H. Takeda** (28)	29,648	66–42–1
110	August 30	Hawks	3–2	Sugiuchi (13–3)	**Miyanishi** (7–1)	Mahara (27)	28,483	66–43–1

September

#	Date	Opponent	Score	Win	Loss	Save	Attendance	Record
111	September 1	@ Marines	2–9	Omine (4–5)	**Itokazu** (2–5)		10,134	66–44–1
112	September 2	@ Marines	3–1	**Sweeney** (4–5)	Kobayashi (3–12)	**H. Takeda** (29)	16,542	67–44–1
113	September 3	@ Marines	1–7	Naruse (8–5)	**Tadano** (5–4)		10,167	67–45–1
114	September 4	@ Eagles	9–2	**Kikuchi** (5–2)	Kawagishi (2–3)		13,930	68–45–1
115	September 5	@ Eagles	10–3	**M. Takeda** (7–7)	Aoyama (1–4)		19,781	69–45–1
116	September 6	@ Eagles	3–4	Fukumori (6–0)	**Tateyama** (3–6)		19,533	69–46–1
117	September 8	@ Lions	0–5	Wakui (14–5)	**Sweeney** (4–6)		15,346	69–47–1
118	September 9	@ Lions	4–7	Ishii (8–8)	**Tadano** (5–5)	Bayliss (1)	14,018	69–48–1
119	September 10	@ Lions	4–5	Fujita (2–0)	**Tateyama** (3–7)	Matsunaga (1)	15,160	69–49–1
120	September 11	Marines	3–2	Shimizu (5–6)	**Fujii** (6–5)	Sikorski (11)	29,449	69–50–1
121	September 12	Marines	4–2	Karakawa (5–6)	**Yagi** (8–3)	Sikorski (12)	38,307	69–51–1
122	September 13	Marines	1–3	**Darvish** (15–5)	Ono (7–7)	**H. Takeda** (30)	42,069	70–51–1
123	September 15	Eagles	2–5	**M. Takeda** (8–7)	Iwakuma (12–6)	**H. Takeda** (31)	20,351	71–51–1
124	September 16	Eagles	7–3	Nagai (11–6)	**Sweeney** (4–7)		20,446	71–52–1
125	September 17	Eagles	7–3	**Tateyama** (4–7)	**Satake** (0–1)	**H. Takeda** (32)	21,636	72–52–1
126	September 18	@ Buffaloes	7–6 (11)	**H. Takeda** (2–0)	Kaneko (11–8)		13,684	73–52–1
127	September 19	@ Buffaloes	4–1	**Itokazu** (3–5)	Hirano (3–11)		18,914	74–52–1
128	September 20	@ Buffaloes	2–7	Vogelsong (1–4)	**Miyanishi** (7–2)		24,208	74–53–1
129	September 21	Lions	5–3	Wakui (15–5)	**M. Takeda** (8–8)		38,165	74–54–1
130	September 22	Lions	5–2	Hsu (1–1)	**Sweeney** (4–8)		34,214	74–55–1
131	September 23	Lions	6–1	Nishiguchi (4–3)	**Yoshikawa** (0–1)		26,955	74–56–1
132	September 25	@ Hawks	0–0 (12)	Game tied after 12 innings			31,278	74–56–2
133	September 26	@ Hawks	5–4 (12)	**H. Takeda** (3–0)	Fujioka (5–8)		32,312	75–56–2
134	September 27	@ Hawks	2–4	Otonari (8–9)	**M. Takeda** (8–9)	Mahara (29)	33,300	75–57–2
135	September 29	Buffaloes	3–12	**Sweeney** (5–8)	Ihara (0–3)		19,576	76–57–2
136	September 30	Buffaloes	2–3	**Itokazu** (4–5)	Kondo (8–12)	**H. Takeda** (33)	17,352	77–57–2

October

#	Date	Opponent	Score	Win	Loss	Save	Attendance	Record
137	October 1	Buffaloes	6–5	Kishida (9–4)	**Hayashi** (3–1)	Kaneko (3)	19,784	77–58–2
138	October 3	Marines	1–11	**Yagi** (9–3)	Omine (5–6)		34,228	78–58–2
139	October 4	Hawks	2–4	**M. Takeda** (9–9)	Otonari (8–10)	**H. Takeda** (34)	41,698	79–58–2
140	October 5	Lions	10–5	Onodera (3–5)	**Hayashi** (3–2)	Fujita (3)	41,999	79–59–2
141	October 6	Lions	4–5 (12)	**Tateyama** (5–7)	Nishiguchi (4–4)		35,442	80–59–2
142	October 7	Lions	3–8	**Fujii** (7–5)	Kimura (0–4)		17,623	81–59–2
143	October 8	@ Buffaloes	1–11	Kishida (10–4)	**Yoshikawa** (0–2)		15,297	81–60–2
144	October 10	Eagles	1–7	**M. Takeda** (10–9)	Aoyama (3–5)		36,257	82–60–2

=== Roster ===
2009 Hokkaido Nippon-Ham Fighters
**Roster**
**Pitchers**: 11 Yu Darvish; 27 Shintaro Ejiri; 18 Shugo Fujii; 19 Masanori Hayashi; 60 Takeshi Ito; 20 Keisaku Itokazu; 59 Takayuki Kanamori; 47 Kazumasa Kikuchi; 17 Ken Miyamoto; 25 Naoki Miyanishi; 15 Ryo Sakakibara; 30 Yataro Sakamoto; 13 Hideki Sunaga; 42 Brian Sweeney; 16 Kazuhito Tadano; 21 Hisashi Takeda; 38 Masaru Takeda; 48 Keisuke Tanimoto; 22 Yoshinori Tateyama; 46 Yusuke Uemura; 29 Tomoya Yagi; 44 Kazunori Yamamoto; 34 Mitsuo Yoshikawa	**Catchers**: 32 Satoshi Nakajima; 28 Shota Ono; 64 Shinya Tsuruoka; **Infielders**: 39 Jason Botts; 4 Yuji Iiyama; 45 Takahiro Imanami; 5 Naoto Inada; 14 Luis Jiménez; 8 Makoto Kaneko; 31 Eiichi Koyano; 6 Sho Nakata; 23 Tomohiro Nioka; 2 Shinji Takahashi; 9 Tomoyuki Oda; 58 Takayuki Takaguchi; 3 Kensuke Tanaka; 24 Dai-Kang Yang	**Outfielders**: 41 Atsunori Inaba; 26 Yoshio Itoi; 52 Toshimasa Konta; 1 Hichori Morimoto; 51 Kazuya Murata; 55 Yoshihiro Sato; 10 Terrmel Sledge; 7 Tomochika Tsuboi	**Manager**: 88 Masataka Nashida

== Postseason ==
=== Climax Series ===
==== Stage 2 ====
Game 1

Team	1	2	3	4	5	6	7	8	9	R	H	E
Rakuten	0	1	0	2	0	0	3	0	2	8	12	0
Nippon-Ham	1	0	0	0	0	0	0	3	5	9	13	0
WP: Masanori Hayashi (1–0) LP: Kazuo Fukumori (0–1); Home runs: RAK: Teppei Tsuchiya (1); NIP: Terrmel Sledge (1)

Game 2

Team	1	2	3	4	5	6	7	8	9	R	H	E
Rakuten	0	0	0	1	0	0	0	0	0	1	10	1
Nippon-Ham	0	0	0	1	0	0	2	0	X	3	9	0
WP: Keisaku Itokazu (1–0) LP: Hisashi Iwakuma (0–1) Sv: Hisashi Takeda (1); Home runs: RAK: Fernando Seguignol (1); NIP: None

Game 3

Team	1	2	3	4	5	6	7	8	9	R	H	E
Rakuten	0	0	0	3	0	0	0	0	0	3	7	0
Nippon-Ham	0	1	0	0	0	0	0	1	0	2	6	0
WP: Masahiro Tanaka (1–0) LP: Tomoya Yagi (0–1); Home runs: RAK: Naoto Watanabe (1); NIP: Shinji Takahashi (1)

Game 4

Team	1	2	3	4	5	6	7	8	9	R	H	E
Rakuten	0	0	0	3	0	0	0	1	0	4	9	0
Nippon-Ham	1	3	0	0	0	0	2	3	X	9	14	0
WP: Shugo Fujii (1–0) LP: Hiromichi Fujiwara (0–1); Home runs: RAK: None; NIP: Hichori Morimoto (1), Terrmel Sledge (2)

=== Japan Series ===
==== Game 1 ====
Team	1	2	3	4	5	6	7	8	9	R	H	E
Yomiuri	0	1	0	0	2	0	1	0	0	4	8	0
Nippon-Ham	0	1	0	0	0	1	0	0	1	3	12	0
WP: Dicky Gonzalez (1–0) LP: Masaru Takeda (0–1) Sv: Marc Kroon (1); Home runs: YOM: Yoshitomo Tani (1); NIP: Terrmel Sledge (1)

==== Game 2 ====
Team	1	2	3	4	5	6	7	8	9	R	H	E
Yomiuri	0	0	0	2	0	0	0	0	0	2	8	0
Nippon-Ham	0	0	4	0	0	0	0	0	x	4	12	0
WP: Yu Darvish (1–0) LP: Tetsuya Utsumi (0–1) Sv: Hisashi Takeda (1); Home runs: YOM: Yoshiyuki Kamei (1); NIP: Atsunori Inaba (1)

==== Game 3 ====
Team	1	2	3	4	5	6	7	8	9	R	H	E
Nippon-Ham	1	1	0	0	1	0	0	1	0	4	4	0
Yomiuri	0	2	1	0	2	0	0	2	X	7	8	3
WP: Wirfin Obispo (1–0) LP: Keisaku Itokazu (0–1) Sv: Marc Kroon (2); Home runs: NIP: Atsunori Inaba (2), Eiichi Koyano (1), Kensuke Tanaka (1); YOM: Lee Seung-Yeop (1), Shinnosuke Abe (1), Michihiro Ogasawara (1)

==== Game 4 ====
Team	1	2	3	4	5	6	7	8	9	R	H	E
Nippon-Ham	0	0	4	0	1	0	2	1	0	8	11	1
Yomiuri	0	0	1	0	0	0	0	3	0	4	13	0
WP: Yagi (1–0) LP: Takahashi (0–1) Sv: Takeda (2); Home runs: NIP: Shinji Takahashi (1); YOM: Ramírez (1)

==== Game 5 ====
Team	1	2	3	4	5	6	7	8	9	R	H	E
Nippon-Ham	0	1	0	0	0	0	0	0	1	2	4	1
Yomiuri	0	0	0	0	0	0	0	1	2	3	7	2
WP: Yamaguchi, (1-0) LP: H. Takeda, (0-1); Home runs: NIP: Takahashi (2); YOM: Kamei (2), Abe (2)

==== Game 6 ====
Team	1	2	3	4	5	6	7	8	9	R	H	E
Yomiuri	0	1	0	0	0	1	0	0	0	2	6	0
Nippon-Ham	0	0	0	0	0	0	0	0	0	0	11	1
WP: Tetsuya Utsumi (1–1) LP: Masaru Takeda (0-2) Sv: Marc Kroon (3)

== Awards ==
Various Fighters players won awards for their regular season performances. Five players were selected for the Best Nine Award: Yu Darvish, Shinji Takahashi, Kensuke Tanaka, Atsunori Inaba and Yoshio Itoi. Shinya Tsuruoka and Eiichi Koyano joined Best Nine winners Takahashi, Tanaka, Inaba and Itoi to take seven of the nine available PL Golden Glove Awards. Darvish was voted the PL Most Valuable Player as well as the PL Most Valuable Pitcher.

== Player statistics ==
=== Batting ===
Player	G	AB	R	H	2B	3B	HR	RBI	AVG	SB
Jason Botts	11	21	4	5	3	0	1	6	.238	0
Yu Darvish	23	5	0	0	0	0	0	0	.000	0
Shugo Fujii	22	3	0	1	0	0	0	0	.333	0
Yuji Iiyama	76	36	14	12	0	0	0	1	.333	2
Takahiro Imanami	5	4	0	1	0	0	0	0	.250	0
Atsunori Inaba	135	500	78	150	37	4	17	85	.300	5
Naoto Inada	65	65	4	18	3	0	0	7	.277	1
Yoshio Itoi	131	425	74	130	40	3	15	58	.306	24
Keisaku Itokazu	13	5	0	1	0	0	0	0	.200	0
Luis Jiménez	39	121	13	28	5	0	5	14	.231	0
Makoto Kaneko	136	454	58	138	31^{*}	5	14	66	.304	6
Kazumasa Kikuchi	58	1	0	0	0	0	0	0	.000	0
Toshimasa Konta	56	65	11	15	2	1	0	4	.231	2
Eiichi Koyano	138	530	65	157	33	4	11	82	.296	7
Hichori Morimoto	107	316	50	78	14	4	1	29	.247	9
Kazuya Murata	44	55	15	16	1	2	0	5	.291	8
Satoshi Nakajima	3	3	1	1	0	0	0	0	.333	0
Sho Nakata	22	36	3	10	2	0	0	1	.278	0
Tomohiro Nioka	69	170	25	43	5	0	4	25	.253	0
Tomoyuki Oda	1	1	0	1	0	0	0	0	1.000	0
Shota Ono	77	154	19	32	9	0	3	15	.208	0
Yoshihiro Sato	10	15	3	3	0	0	2	2	.200	1
Terrmel Sledge	117	418	53	111	27	1	27	88	.266	1
Brian Sweeney	21	2	0	0	0	0	0	0	.000	0
Takayuki Takaguchi	3	5	0	0	0	0	0	0	.000	0
Shinji Takahashi	134	508	66	157	22	1	8	75	.309	7
Masaru Takeda	24	4	0	0	0	0	0	0	.000	0
Kensuke Tanaka	144	575	93	163	34	4	3	49	.283	31
Tomochika Tsuboi	84	146	13	39	8	0	0	15	.267	0
Shinya Tsuruoka	122	263	25	58	14	1	1	29	.221	1
Tomoya Yagi	20	3	0	0	0	0	0	0	.000	0
Yang Dai-Kang	15	11	2	2	0	0	0	0	.182	0

Indicates PL leader in the category
^* Makoto Kaneko set a NPB record on April 14, 2009, by hitting at least one double in seven consecutive games.

=== Pitching ===
Player	W	L	ERA	G	Win%	SV	IP	R	ER	BB	K
Yu Darvish	15	5	1.73	23	.750	0	182	36	35	45	167
Shintaro Ejiri	2	1	3.20	45	.667	0	45	16	16	25	39
Shugo Fujii	7	5	3.53	22	.583	0	114 2/3	45	45	48	63
Masanori Hayashi	3	2	3.33	46	.600	0	46	17	17	25	42
Takeshi Ito	0	0	0.00	1	.000	0	1/3	0	0	0	1
Keisaku Itokazu	4	5	4.56	13	.444	0	71	40	36	27	43
Takayuki Kanamori	0	0	0.84	18	.000	0	21 1/3	2	2	8	9
Kazumasa Kikuchi	5	2	3.67	58	.714	0	61 1/3	25	25	11	62
Ken Miyamoto	0	0	3.07	12	.000	0	14 2/3	6	5	7	3
Naoki Miyanishi	7	2	2.89	58	.778	0	46 2/3	15	15	15	55
Ryo Sakakibara	0	1	6.08	10	.000	0	26 2/3	19	18	8	23
Yataro Sakamoto	0	2	5.97	19	.000	0	28 2/3	19	19	13	11
Hideki Sunaga	0	1	8.50	9	.000	0	18	17	17	8	7
Brian Sweeney	5	8	5.32	21	.385	0	118 1/3	73	70	52	58
Kazuhito Tadano	5	5	5.76	13	.500	0	70 1/3	45	45	27	46
Hisashi Takeda	3	0	1.20	55	1.000	34	60	10	8	14	38
Masaru Takeda	10	9	3.55	24	.526	0	144 1/3	58	57	20	99
Keisuke Tanimoto	2	0	5.53	24	1.000	0	27 2/3	18	17	20	20
Yoshinori Tateyama	5	7	3.78	46	.417	0	47 2/3	24	20	15	43
Yusuke Uemura	0	0	15.00	1	.000	0	3	5	5	4	2
Tomoya Yagi	9	3	2.88	20	.750	0	122	41	39	40	76
Kazunori Yamamoto	0	0	7.71	3	.000	0	2 1/3	2	2	1	3
Mitsuo Yoshikawa	0	2	6.61	3	.000	0	16 1/3	17	12	10	18

Indicates PL leader in the category
