= 2010 Hokkaido Nippon-Ham Fighters season =

2010 Hokkaido Nippon-Ham Fighters
- League: Pacific League
- Ballpark: Sapporo Dome
- Record: 74–67–3 (.524)
- League place: 6
- Owners: Nippon Ham
- Manager: Masataka Nashida

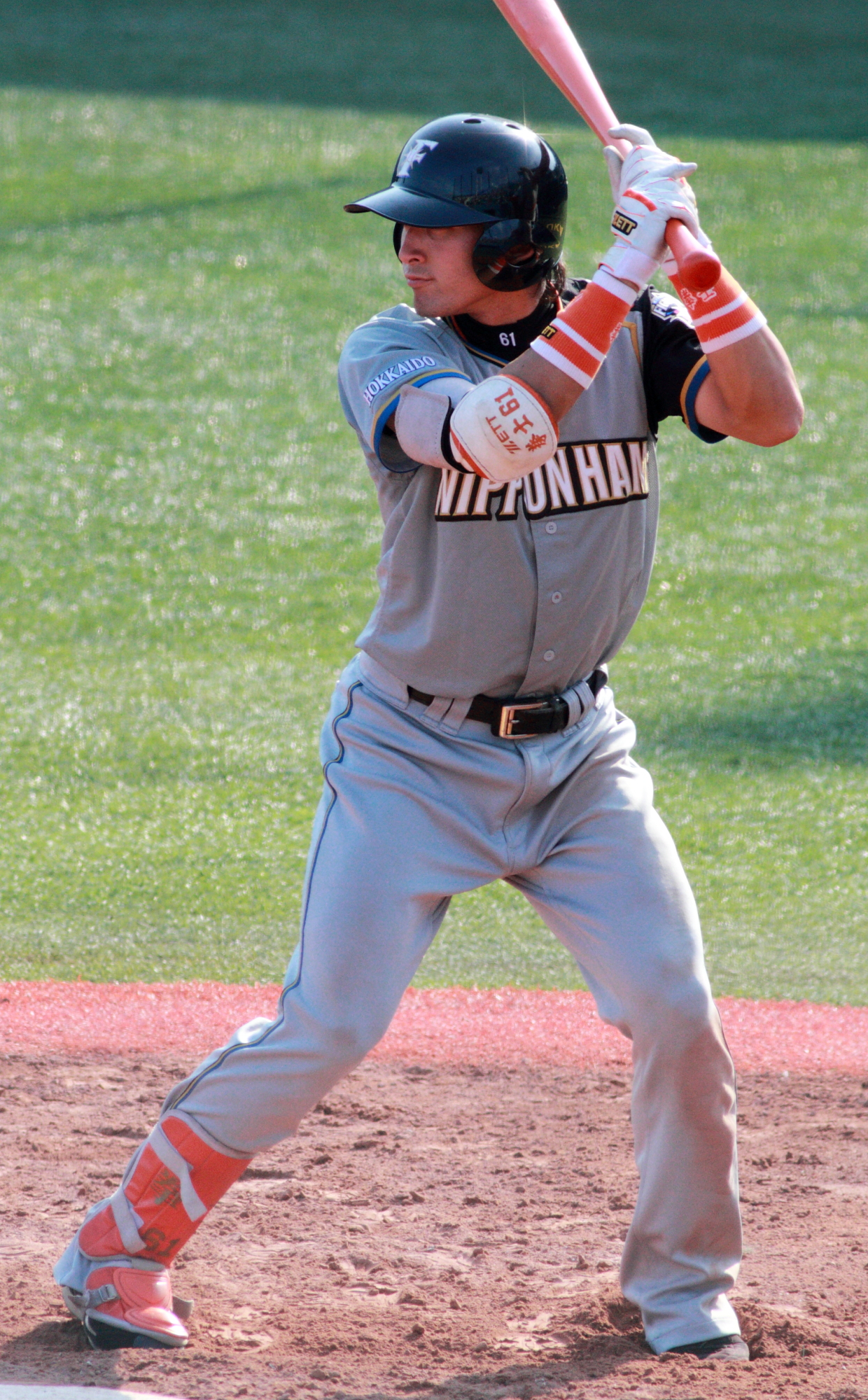
Kenshi Sugiya, infielder of the Hokkaido Nippon-Ham Fighters, at Yokosuka Stadium on September 18, 2010

The 2010 Hokkaido Nippon-Ham Fighters season was the 65th season for the Hokkaido Nippon-Ham Fighters franchise.

== Regular season ==
=== Standings ===
2010 Pacific League standings
Team	Pld	W	L	T	PCT	GB
Fukuoka SoftBank Hawks	144	76	63	5	.545	—
Saitama Seibu Lions	144	78	65	1	.545	—
Chiba Lotte Marines	144	75	67	2	.528	2.5
Hokkaido Nippon-Ham Fighters	**144**	**74**	**67**	**3**	.524	**3**
Orix Buffaloes	144	69	71	4	.493	7.5
Tohoku Rakuten Golden Eagles	144	62	79	3	.441	15

Source: https://npb.jp/bis/eng/2010/stats/

=== Record vs. opponents ===
**Pacific League**
Chiba Lotte Marines	––
Fukuoka SoftBank Hawks	––
Orix Buffaloes	––
Saitama Seibu Lions	––
Tohoku Rakuten Golden Eagles	––
**Central League**
Chunichi Dragons	––
Hanshin Tigers	––
Hiroshima Toyo Carp	––
Tokyo Yakult Swallows	––
Yokohama BayStars	––
Yomiuri Giants	––
Interleague total	––
**Total**	––

=== Game log ===
Legend
	Fighters win
	Fighters loss
	Fighters tie
	Postponement
**Bold**	Fighters team member

2010 Game Log
March

#	Date	Opponent	Score	Win	Loss	Save	Attendance	Record
1	March 20	Hawks	5–3	Sugiuchi (1–0)	**Darvish** (0–1)	Mahara (1)	42,002	0–1–0
2	March 21	Hawks	2–1 (11)	Falkenborg (1–0)	**H. Takeda** (0–1)	Mahara (2)	37,125	0–2–0
3	March 22	Hawks	5–16	**Kida** (1–0)	Houlton (0–1)		33,021	1–2–0
4	March 26	@ Marines	1–9	Naruse (1–1)	**Yagi** (0–1)		24,277	1–3–0
5	March 27	@ Marines	3–3 (12)	Game tied after 12 innings			27,031	1–3–1
6	March 28	@ Marines	5–6	Ito (1–0)	**H. Takeda** (0–2)		23,194	1–4–1
7	March 30	Buffaloes	8–4	Kishida (2–0)	**Itokazu** (0–1)		17,588	1–5–1
8	March 31	Buffaloes	3–2	Yamamoto (1–0)	**Wolfe** (0–1)	Leicester (2)	18,429	1–6–1

April

#	Date	Opponent	Score	Win	Loss	Save	Attendance	Record
9	April 2	Lions	6–4	Fujita (1–0)	**H. Takeda** (0–3)	Sikorski (4)	19,740	1–7–1
10	April 3	Lions	1–2	**Darvish** (1–1)	Hsu (0–1)	**Wolfe** (1)	30,225	2–7–1
11	April 4	Lions	4–0	Hoashi (1–1)	**M. Takeda** (0–1)		28,830	2–8–1

=== Roster ===
2010 Hokkaido Nippon-Ham Fighters
**Roster**
**Pitchers**: 12 Buddy Carlyle; 11 Yu Darvish; 66 Romash Tasuku Dass; 27 Shintaro Ejiri; 19 Masanori Hayashi; 27 Yuya Ishii; 20 Keisaku Itokazu; 59 Takayuki Kanamori; 49 Takeharu Kato; 31 Bob Keppel; 42 Masao Kida; 47 Kazumasa Kikuchi; 35 Tatsuo Kinoshita; 43 Hirotoshi Masui; 30 Takahiro Matsuka; 17 Ken Miyamoto; 25 Naoki Miyanishi; 21 Hisashi Takeda; 38 Masaru Takeda; 22 Yoshinori Tateyama; 10 Brian Wolfe; 29 Tomoya Yagi	**Catchers**: 60 Yuji Arahari; 62 Ryota Imanari; 32 Satoshi Nakajima; 28 Shota Ono; 64 Shinya Tsuruoka; **Infielders**: 50 Suguru Ichikawa; 4 Yuji Iiyama; 45 Takahiro Imanami; 40 Manabu Iwadate; 8 Makoto Kaneko; 39 Masayoshi Kato; 31 Eiichi Koyano; 56 Takuya Nakashima; 6 Sho Nakata; 23 Tomohiro Nioka; 58 Takayuki Takaguchi; 2 Shinji Takahashi; 3 Kensuke Tanaka; 24 Yang Dai-Kang	**Outfielders**: 41 Atsunori Inaba; 26 Yoshio Itoi; 52 Toshimasa Konta; 1 Hichori Morimoto; 51 Kazuya Murata; 54 Seiichi Ohira; 7 Tomochika Tsuboi	**Manager**: 88 Masataka Nashida
