= 2009 Pacific League Climax Series =

Japanese baseball series

First stage
Team (Wins)		Manager	Season
Tohoku Rakuten Golden Eagles (2)		Katsuya Nomura	77–66–1 (.538), 5½ GB
Fukuoka SoftBank Hawks (0)		Koji Akiyama	74–65–5 (.532), 6½ GB
- Dates: October 16–17

Second stage
Team (Wins)		Manager	Season
Hokkaido Nippon-Ham Fighters (4)		Masataka Nashida	82–60–2 (.577), 5½ GA
Tohoku Rakuten Golden Eagles (1)		Katsuya Nomura	77–66–1 (.538), 5½ GB
- Dates: October 21–24
- MVP: Terrmel Sledge (Nippon-Ham)

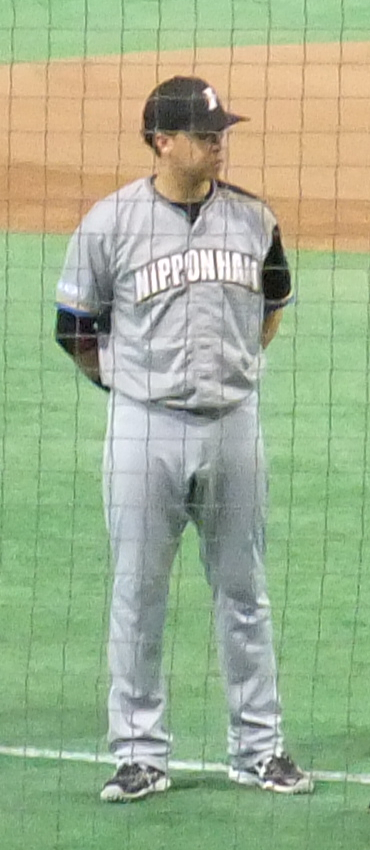
Terrmel Sledge, outfielder of the Hokkaido Nippon-Ham Fighters, at Tokyo Dome, 2009

The 2009 Pacific League Climax Series (PLCS) consisted of two consecutive series, Stage 1 being a best-of-three series and Stage 2 being a best-of-six with the top seed being awarded a one-win advantage. The winner of the series advanced to the 2009 Japan Series, where they competed against the 2009 Central League Climax Series winner. The top three regular-season finishers played in the two series. The PLCS began on with the first game of Stage 1 on October 16 and ended with the final game of Stage 2 on October 24.

== First stage ==
=== Summary ===
Tohoku Rakuten Golden Eagles won the series, 2–0.

Game	Date	Score	Location	Time	Attendance
1	October 16	Fukuoka SoftBank Hawks – 4, Tohoku Rakuten Golden Eagles – 11	Kleenex Stadium	3:00	21,303
2	October 17	Fukuoka SoftBank Hawks – 1, Tohoku Rakuten Golden Eagles – 4	Kleenex Stadium	2:47	21,388

=== Game 1 ===
Friday, October 16, 2009 at Nippon Paper Kleenex Stadium Miyagi in Sendai, Miyagi Prefecture
Team	1	2	3	4	5	6	7	8	9	R	H	E
SoftBank	0	0	0	4	0	0	0	0	0	4	6	2
Rakuten	3	0	4	0	0	3	1	0	X	11	12	1
WP: Hisashi Iwakuma (1–0) LP: Toshiya Sugiuchi (0–1); Home runs: SOF: None; RAK: Yosuke Takasu (1), Fernando Seguignol (1), Toshiya Nakashima (1), Takeshi Yamasaki (1)

=== Game 2 ===
Saturday, October 17, 2009 at Nippon Paper Kleenex Stadium Miyagi in Sendai, Miyagi Prefecture
Team	1	2	3	4	5	6	7	8	9	R	H	E
SoftBank	0	0	0	0	0	0	0	1	0	1	7	0
Rakuten	0	0	0	1	3	0	0	0	X	4	8	1
WP: Masahiro Tanaka (1–0) LP: Dennis Houlton (0–1); Home runs: SOF: None; RAK: Takeshi Yamasaki (2)

== Second stage ==
=== Summary ===
Hokkaido Nippon-Ham Fighters won the series, 4–1*.

Game	Date	Score	Location	Time	Attendance
1	October 21	Tohoku Rakuten Golden Eagles – 8, Hokkaido Nippon-Ham Fighters – 9	Sapporo Dome	3:28	38,235
2	October 22	Tohoku Rakuten Golden Eagles – 1, Hokkaido Nippon-Ham Fighters – 3	Sapporo Dome	3:19	32,713
3	October 23	Tohoku Rakuten Golden Eagles – 3, Hokkaido Nippon-Ham Fighters – 2	Sapporo Dome	2:48	42,328
4	October 24	Tohoku Rakuten Golden Eagles – 4, Hokkaido Nippon-Ham Fighters – 9	Sapporo Dome	3:43	42,328

* The Pacific League regular season champion is given a one-game advantage in the Second Stage.

=== Game 1 ===
Wednesday, October 21, 2009 at Sapporo Dome in Sapporo, Hokkaido
Team	1	2	3	4	5	6	7	8	9	R	H	E
Rakuten	0	1	0	2	0	0	3	0	2	8	12	0
Nippon-Ham	1	0	0	0	0	0	0	3	5	9	13	0
WP: Masanori Hayashi (1–0) LP: Kazuo Fukumori (0–1); Home runs: RAK: Teppei Tsuchiya (1); NIP: Terrmel Sledge (1)

=== Game 2 ===
Thursday, October 22, 2009 at Sapporo Dome in Sapporo, Hokkaido
Team	1	2	3	4	5	6	7	8	9	R	H	E
Rakuten	0	0	0	1	0	0	0	0	0	1	10	1
Nippon-Ham	0	0	0	1	0	0	2	0	X	3	9	0
WP: Keisaku Itokazu (1–0) LP: Hisashi Iwakuma (0–1) Sv: Hisashi Takeda (1); Home runs: RAK: Fernando Seguignol (1); NIP: None

=== Game 3 ===
Friday, October 23, 2009 at Sapporo Dome in Sapporo, Hokkaido
Team	1	2	3	4	5	6	7	8	9	R	H	E
Rakuten	0	0	0	3	0	0	0	0	0	3	7	0
Nippon-Ham	0	1	0	0	0	0	0	1	0	2	6	0
WP: Masahiro Tanaka (1–0) LP: Tomoya Yagi (0–1); Home runs: RAK: Naoto Watanabe (1); NIP: Shinji Takahashi (1)

=== Game 4 ===
Saturday, October 24, 2009 at Sapporo Dome in Sapporo, Hokkaido
Team	1	2	3	4	5	6	7	8	9	R	H	E
Rakuten	0	0	0	3	0	0	0	1	0	4	9	0
Nippon-Ham	1	3	0	0	0	0	2	3	X	9	14	0
WP: Shugo Fujii (1–0) LP: Hiromichi Fujiwara (0–1); Home runs: RAK: None; NIP: Hichori Morimoto (1), Terrmel Sledge (2)
