= Shōta Ōno =

Japanese baseball player

Shōta Ōno 大野 奨太
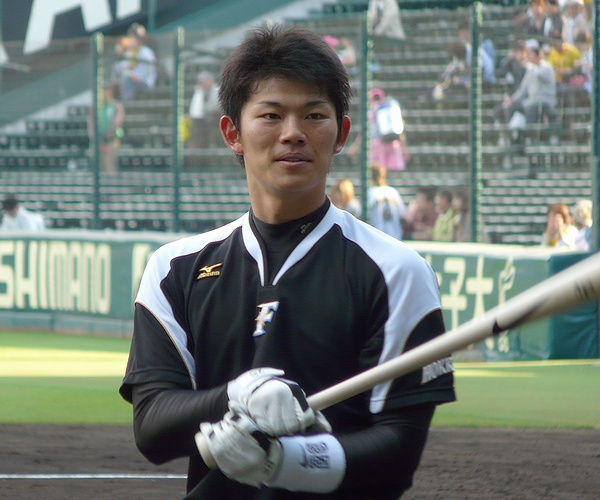
- Ohno with the Hokkaido Nippon-Ham Fighters

Chunichi Dragons – No. 72
- Catcher/Coach
- Born: January 13, 1987 (age 39); Ōgaki, Gifu, Japan
- Batted: Right Threw: Right

NPB debut
- 5 April, 2009, for the Hokkaido Nippon-Ham Fighters

Last NPB appearance
- 3 October, 2023, for the Chunichi Dragons

NPB statistics
- Batting average: .214
- Home runs: 31
- RBI: 168
- Stats at Baseball Reference

Teams
- As player: Hokkaido Nippon-Ham Fighters (2009–2017); Chunichi Dragons (2018-2023); As coach: Chunichi Dragons (2024-Present)

Career highlights and awards
- Japan Series winner (2016); Golden Glove Award (2016); Pacific League Battery Award, with Shohei Ohtani (2015); NPB All-Star (2014)

Shōta Ōno (大野 奨太, born January 13, 1987, in Ōgaki, Gifu) is a current coach and former Japanese professional baseball catcher for the Chunichi Dragons in Japan's Nippon Professional Baseball. He previously played for the Hokkaido Nippon Ham Fighters.

== Early career ==
As an elementary school student in Gifu Prefecture, Ōno played for local team Arasaki Baseball boys where he was a catcher, pitcher and third baseman. In middle school, he played as a third baseman for Seinō Boys where he was selected in the representative team for Gifu prefecture. From middle school, it was Ōno's dream to play for Gifu powerhouse, Gifu Commercial High School, but as many of his Gifu representative teammates were thinking the same thing, Ōno entered Gifu Sōgō Gakuen High School instead.

From his first year of high school, Ōno was a regular at third base. In fall, the team's catcher damaged his shoulder and Ōno converted to catcher. Two years in a row, Ōno was able to help lead his team to an appearance in the final of the Gifu prefectural tournament, but both times they would be bundled out with the final team he faced being Gifu Commercial High School. Throughout his high school career, Ōno hit 29 homeruns.

Following graduation from high school, Ōno enrolled at Toyo University where he was on the bench in his first spring behind junior year catcher, Daisuke Tanaka. From spring of his sophomore year, Ōno became the regular catcher for the team and helped the team to its fourth consecutive season win and second consecutive Meiji Jingu Baseball Tournament win. In spring of his senior year, he was named the first catcher in 22 years to be named MVP and was named in the best 9 for 4 straight season from spring of his sophomore year. In the Tohto University Baseball League, Ōno played in 55 games racking up 43 hits, a batting average of .259 with 6 homeruns and 19 RBIs.

On 30 October 2008, Ōno was the first round pick for the Hokkaido Nippon Ham Fighters at the 2008 NPB Draft and signed a provisional contract with a ¥100 million sign-on bonus and a ¥13 million yearly salary. It was the first time the Fighters had selected a catcher in the first round since 1998 and only the second in their history.

== Professional career ==
=== Nippon Ham Fighters ===
==== Rookie Year ====
Ōno was assigned to the first team in 2009 spring training and stayed that way up to opening day. On April 5, he made his debut against the Tohoku Rakuten Golden Eagles. On April 11, he made his starting debut against the Fukuoka SoftBank Hawks and helped lead Shugo Fujii to keeping runs off the board. From then on, Ōno became the preferred catcher for Fujii and aside from starts from Tomoya Yagi and Yu Darvish who preferred Shinya Tsuruoka, he started in more games. In August, Ōno caught influenza and was absent for the team for a short time. Over the course of his rookie season, Ōno was not deregistered from the team even once. On November 5, he became the first rookie catcher to start in the 2009 Japan Series.

==== 2010–2013 ====
In 2010, Ōno would once again battle with Tsuruoka for the first-team mask. Even though Fujii had moved to the Yomiuri Giants in the off-season, Ōno became the main catcher for southpaws and that year, 14-winner Masaru Takeda allowing him to make even more appearances. Also, different from his rookie year, Ōno was given starts to catch for Yagi and Darvish.

In 2011, as Tsuruoka suffered injury before the start of the season, Ōno played in all games until his return. But once Tsuruoka did make his return he tended to be more favoured and Ōno's chances were harder to come by. On October 15, due to back pain, he experienced his first ever de-registration from the first team but made his comeback in the first game of the Pacific League Climax Series. Compared to previous seasons, Ōno's performance with the bat dropped considerably but he led the league in runners thrown out percentage with .323.

The following year, Ōno would once again share time behind the plate with Tsuruoka acting as the primary catcher for Brian Wolfe and Takeda, but due to poor batting form and Tsuruoka's good form, Tsuruoka would take over as the primary catcher. As a result, on July 4, Ōno was deregistered from the first team for the first time not related to injury. Ten days later on July 14, Ōno would return to the top team but would only catch for Wolfe and Keisuke Tanimoto leading to his poorest yearly statistics up until that point. In the off-season, Ōno would change his number to 2 as worn by club legends Shinji Takahashi and Michihiro Ogasawara.

In 2013, competition with Tsuruoka would continue but with injury sidelining Tsuruoka in June, Ōno's appearances increased over the tail end of the season. He would hit over .250 with an OPS of over .700 to mark his best batting totals to date while on the defensive side he was the only catcher in NPB to have throw runners out with over a 40% success rate at .421.

==== 2014–2017 ====
With Tsuruoka's departure to the Fukuoka SoftBank Hawks via free agency in the 2013 off-season, Ōno was given the starting day mask for the first time since 2011. But due to poor hitting once more, May addition from the Giants, Yuya Ichikawa saw more time behind the plate but following the end of May, competition would return to normal with Ōno and Ichikawa sharing duties. On May 17 in a game against the Chiba Lotte Marines with the scores tied at 1–1 in the 11th inning, Ōno hit his career first walk-off home run off Takahiro Matsunaga. Over the course of the season, Ōno played in a career high of 105 games with a personal best 6 homeruns.

In 2015, Ōno started the season on the farm after suffering from elbow pain but returned to the first team on April 28, making his first appearance on May 4. 2014's back-up catcher, Ichikawa also underwent surgery for a hernia problem leaving no senior catcher with the top team. In the first team, Ryō Ishikawa and Kensuke Kondō filled in behind the plate, with Ōno playing a support role until he returned to fill fitness. From June, Ōno's appearances increased while in July, Kondō was made designated hitter due to his batting prowess. With the return of Ichikawa, Ōno went back to sharing the plate. For the first time since turning pro, Ōno ended the season with zero homeruns. At the end of the season, he was made captain of the team after Naoki Miyanishi stepped down. He would also give up the 2 jersey to Kenshi Sugiya while changing to the 27 left open by the retirement of Satoshi Nakajima.

The following year, Ōno would have one of his most successful seasons and returned as starting day catcher for the first time in two years. He would proceed to hit his first homer in two years against Kodai Senga on April 23 against the SoftBank Hawks. On July 8 against the Lotte Marines, he would hit homers in back-to-back plate appearances and would otherwise end his season with personal best hitting figures.

In 2017, Ōno would play in 83 games, however due to a right elbow injury, only batted .221 with 3 homeruns and 13 RBI including a .098 percentage of runners thrown out. With the team finishing the season 5th, on October 16 underwent endoscopic elbow surgery which was ultimately successful. Ōno, eligible for free agency, would elect to explore the market on November 9 with negotiations with the Fighters ongoing. At this point, hometown team, Chunichi Dragons entered the race for his services after making public their desire to improve their catching stocks and on December 9, the move was finalised.

=== Chunichi Dragons ===
==== 2018–Present ====
On December 9, 2017, the Dragons revealed they had captured Ōno's signature having agreed to a 3-year, ¥250 million deal and receiving the 27 jersey previously worn by Motonobu Tanishige.

In the 2018 season, Ōno's shoulder flared up, restricting him to only 50 appearances with Masato Matsui taking over as main catcher for the majority of season.

In 2019, Ōno was on the starting day roster but due to the rise of Takuma Katō and the re-occurrence of his right elbow pain, he was de-registered from the first team on May 31. On August 25, Ōno returned to the first team but ended the season with a career low of 34 games.

== International career ==
On October 18, 2016, Ōno was called up to the Japanese national baseball team for exhibition games against the Netherlands and Mexico. On November 12, he would hit a walk-off single to win the game.

Ōno was selected for the 2017 World Baseball Classic however only played in one game against China in the first round.

== Play style ==
Fighters pitching coach Kazuyuki Atsuzawa described Ōno's ability to lead in comparison to Shinya Tsuruoka as similar to motherly figure, Kakaadenka.

While providing excellent lead from behind the plate, Ōno's biggest weapon is his pop-time and his flat throws. In addition to his strong arm, his "catching ability is good" so that makes his throw-out percentage high. However, from 2017 onwards with his elbow injury in the background, his ability to throw out runners has significantly decreased.
