= 2002 Japan Series =

Team (Wins)	Managers	Season
Yomiuri Giants (4)	Tatsunori Hara	86–52–2 (.623), 11 GA
Seibu Lions (0)	Haruki Ihara	90–49–1 (.647), 16½ GA
- Dates: October 26–30
- MVP: Tomohiro Nioka (Yomiuri)
- FSA: Alex Cabrera (Seibu)

Broadcast
- Television: NTV (Game 1, 2), TV Asahi (Game 3), TBS (Game 4)

The 2002 Japan Series was the championship series of Nippon Professional Baseball for the 2002 season. The 53rd edition of the Series, it was a best-of-seven playoff that matched the Central League champion Yomiuri Giants against the Pacific League champion Seibu Lions. The Giants swept the Lions in four games to win their 20th Japan Series championship.

== Summary ==
CL Yomiuri Giants (4) vs. PL Seibu Lions (0)

Game	Date	Score	Location	Time	Attendance
1	October 26	Seibu Lions – 1, Yomiuri Giants – 4	Tokyo Dome	2:55	45,107
2	October 27	Seibu Lions – 4, Yomiuri Giants – 9	Tokyo Dome	3:16	45,223
3	October 29	Yomiuri Giants – 10, Seibu Lions – 2	Seibu Dome	3:15	30,933
4	October 30	Yomiuri Giants – 6, Seibu Lions – 2	Seibu Dome	3:12	31,072

== Game summaries ==
=== Game 1 ===
Saturday, October 26, 2002, 6:02 pm (JST) at Tokyo Dome in Bunkyō, Tokyo
Team	1	2	3	4	5	6	7	8	9	R	H	E
Seibu	0	0	0	0	0	0	0	0	1	1	6	1
Yomiuri	0	0	4	0	0	0	0	0	X	4	6	0
WP: Koji Uehara (1–0) LP: Daisuke Matsuzaka (0–1); Home runs: SEI: Alex Cabrera (1); YOM: Takayuki Shimizu (1), Kazuhiro Kiyohara (1)

=== Game 2 ===
Sunday, October 27, 2002, 6:01 pm (JST) at Tokyo Dome in Bunkyō, Tokyo
Team	1	2	3	4	5	6	7	8	9	R	H	E
Seibu	0	0	0	0	0	1	0	2	1	4	9	0
Yomiuri	1	0	6	0	0	0	2	0	X	9	13	0
WP: Masumi Kuwata (1–0) LP: Takashi Ishii (0–1); Home runs: SAI: Alex Cabrera (2); YOM: None

=== Game 3 ===
Tuesday, October 29, 2002, 6:22 pm (JST) at Seibu Dome in Tokorozawa, Saitama
Team	1	2	3	4	5	6	7	8	9	R	H	E
Yomiuri	0	1	2	4	0	0	1	2	0	10	13	0
Seibu	1	0	0	0	0	0	0	1	0	2	8	0
WP: Kimiyasu Kudo (1–0) LP: Chang Chih-chia (0–1); Home runs: YOM: Kazuhiro Kiyohara (2), Tomohiro Nioka (1), Yoshinobu Takahashi (1); SEI: Kazuo Matsui (1)

Tomohiro Nioka hit a grand slam to open the floodgates for the Giants in a victory that saw them on the brink of winning the championship.

=== Game 4 ===
Wednesday, October 30, 2002, 6:21 pm (JST) at Seibu Dome in Tokorozawa, Saitama
Team	1	2	3	4	5	6	7	8	9	R	H	E
Yomiuri	0	2	0	0	0	3	1	0	0	6	6	1
Seibu	0	0	0	0	2	0	0	0	0	2	4	1
WP: Hisanori Takahashi (1–0) LP: Daisuke Matsuzaka (0–2); Home runs: YOM: Takayuki Saito (1); SEI: Tom Evans (1)

With the game tied in the sixth inning, Koji Goto delivered a pinch-hit two-run triple to break the game open for the Giants, who rode off a complete game from Hisanori Takahashi, who struck out Tom Evans to end the game and the series.

Tomohiro Nioka was named MVP for his efforts in the series, which saw him collect nine hits in four games. The Giants were just the sixth team to win the Japan Series in a sweep. Two days later, Giants slugger Hideki Matsui announced his desire to play in Major League Baseball, which he would do in 2003.

== See also ==
- 2002 World Series
