= Wirfin Obispo =

American baseball player (born 1984)

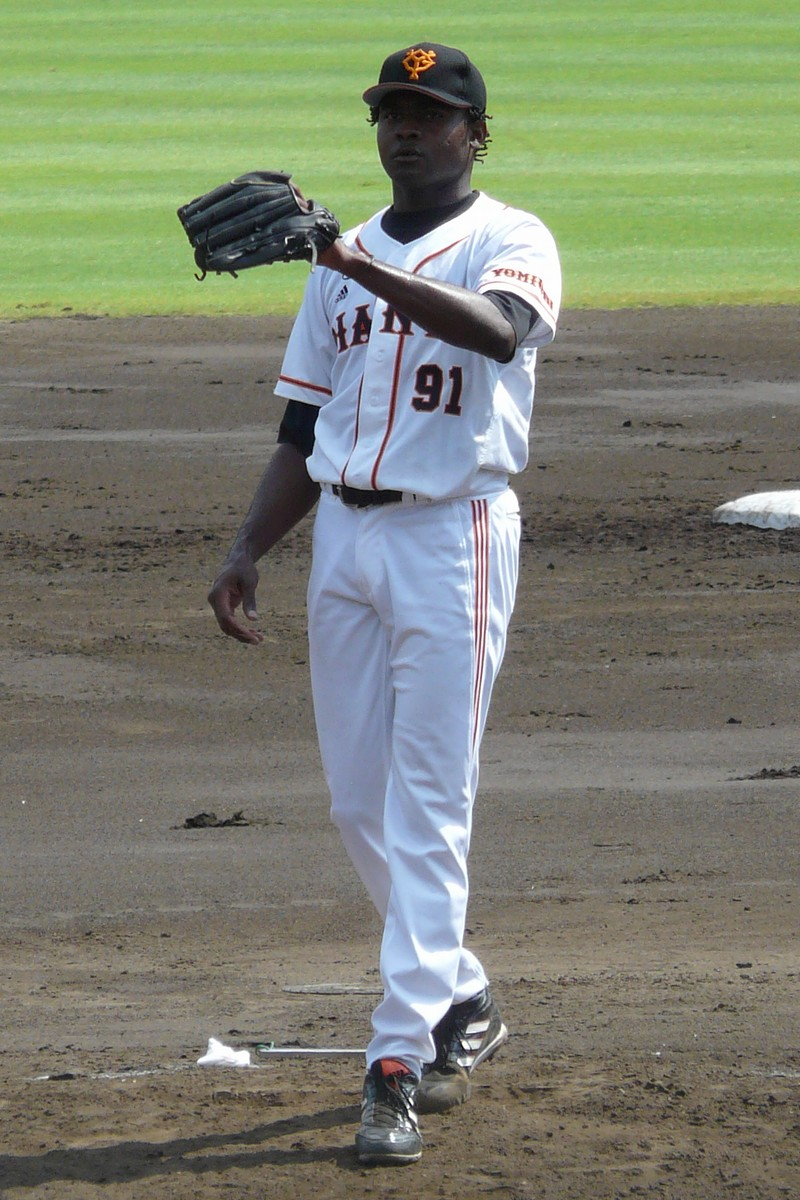
- Obispo with the Yomiuri Giants

Free agent
- Pitcher
- Born: September 26, 1984 (age 41); San Pedro de Macorís, Dominican Republic
- Bats: Right Throws: Right

NPB debut
- August 14, 2007, for the Yomiuri Giants

NPB statistics (through 2011 season)
- Win–loss record: 8–4
- Earned run average: 4.13
- Strikeouts: 71
- Stats at Baseball Reference

Teams
- Yomiuri Giants (2007–2010); Hokkaido Nippon Ham Fighters (2011)

Career highlights and awards
- Japan Series champion (2009)

Wirfin Yobany Obispo Vargas (born September 26, 1984) is a Dominican professional baseball pitcher who is currently a free agent. He has previously played in Nippon Professional Baseball (NPB) for the Yomiuri Giants of the Central League (2007–2010) and Hokkaido Nippon Ham Fighters of the Pacific League (2011).

== Career ==
=== Boston Red Sox ===
Obispo was originally signed by the Boston Red Sox as an international free agent on January 20, 2002. He played in the Dominican Summer League with the DSL Red Sox as a shortstop before being released on November 3, 2003.

=== Cincinnati Reds ===
On January 23, 2004, Obispo signed a minor league contract with the Cincinnati Reds organization. Obispo appeared in 14 games for the Dominican Summer League Reds in 2006, recording a 4–5 record and 2.04 ERA.

=== Yomiuri Giants ===
Obispo signed with the Yomiuri Giants of Nippon Professional Baseball for the 2007 season, but only made 2 appearances for the club, pitching a scoreless inning in total. In 2008, Obispo appeared in 37 games for Yomiuri's minor league club, recording a 4.24 ERA with 41 strikeouts, but did not play with the main team. In 2009, Obispo pitched in 14 games for Yomiuri, registering a 6–1 record and 2.45 ERA with 48 strikeouts. Obispo won the 2009 Japan Series with the Giants that year. In 2010, Obispo pitched to a 5.21 ERA with 22 strikeouts in 14 games for the Giants.

=== Hokkaido Nippon-Ham Fighters ===
On November 6, 2010, Obispo was traded to the Hokkaido Nippon-Ham Fighters in exchange for outfielder Toshimasa Konta and southpaw Hideki Sunaga. Obispo only made two appearances for the Fighters in 2011, allowing six runs in one inning of work.

=== Cincinnati Reds (second stint) ===
On February 2, 2012, Obispo signed a minor league contract with the Cincinnati Reds organization. He split the 2012 season between the Triple-A Louisville Bats and the Double-A Pensacola Blue Wahoos, where he pitched to a 5–3 record with a 3.00 ERA in 35 games, 13 of them starts.

=== Atlanta Braves ===
On November 5, 2012, Obispo signed a minor league deal with the Atlanta Braves organization that included an invitation to spring training. He spent the 2013 season with the Triple-A Gwinnett Braves, registering a 2–4 record and 3.53 ERA in 54 games. The Braves added him to their 40-man roster on November 1, 2013. On May 31, 2014, Obispo was designated for assignment by the Braves following the promotion of Shae Simmons.

=== Pittsburgh Pirates ===
On June 1, 2014, Obispo was claimed off waivers by the Pittsburgh Pirates and was assigned to the Triple-A Indianapolis Indians. On August 13, Obispo was designated for assignment by the Pirates after they claimed Ramon Cabrera off waivers. On August 21, Obispo was outrighted to Indianapolis.

=== Milwaukee Brewers ===
On December 2, 2014, Obispo signed a minor league contract with the Milwaukee Brewers organization. He was assigned to the Double-A Biloxi Shuckers to begin the season. He pitched to a 1.99 ERA in 24 games for Biloxi and the Triple-A Colorado Springs Sky Sox before being released on July 25, 2015.

=== Sultanes de Monterrey ===
On February 2, 2016, Obispo signed with the Sultanes de Monterrey of the Mexican League. He was named an All-Star that season after pitching to a 6–5 record with a 3.15 ERA in 48 games. Obispo was again an All-Star in 2017, after recording a stellar 2.12 ERA and a 7–5 record with 99 strikeouts in 57 appearances. Obispo was an All-Star for a third straight year in 2018, striking out 77 in 52 games. Obispo earned his fourth LMB All-Star nod in 2019, after he pitched to a 2.62 ERA and 6–5 record with 77 strikeouts. Obispo did not play in a game in 2020 due to the cancellation of the Mexican League season because of the COVID-19 pandemic. In 16 games with Monterrey in 2021, Obispo logged a 1–3 record and 3.86 ERA.

=== Pericos de Puebla ===
On July 2, 2021, Obispo was traded to the Pericos de Puebla of the Mexican League. In two appearances, he registered a 13.50 ERA and gave up three runs (one earned).

=== Acereros de Monclova ===
On July 12, 2021, Obispo was traded to the Acereros de Monclova of the Mexican League in exchange for pitchers David Richardson and Adam Quintana.

In 2023, Obispo made 35 appearances for Monclova, posting a 1.91 ERA with 38 strikeouts and 15 saves across 37 2/3 innings pitched.

=== Olmecas de Tabasco ===
On February 3, 2024, Obispo was traded to the Olmecas de Tabasco in exchange for Luis Escobar. In 9 games for Tabasco, he recorded a 1.80 ERA with 15 strikeouts across 10 innings pitched. On May 7, Obispo was suspended by the LMB for the remainder of the season following an incident in which he assaulted a fan.

Obispo made 30 appearances for Tabasco in 2025, logging a 3-1 record and 7.01 ERA with 26 strikeouts across 25 2/3 innings pitched.

=== Caliente de Durango ===
On July 10, 2025, Obispo was traded alongside Randy Romero to the Tigres de Quintana Roo of the Mexican League in exchange for Leonardo Reginatto. However, Obispo and Romero were immediately traded to the Caliente de Durango in exchange for David Hensley. He made nine appearances for Durango, logging an 0-1 record and 10.13 ERA with nine strikeouts across eight innings pitched. Obispo was released by the Caliente on November 9.

=== Piratas de Campeche ===
On January 30, 2026, Obispo signed with the Piratas de Campeche of the Mexican League. He did not make the opening day roster and was released.

== Legal issues ==
On November 23, 2020, Obispo was arrested in the Dominican Republic after confronting police with a shotgun when he was out past curfew.
