= Ryo Sakakibara =

Japanese baseball player

- Pitcher
- Born: August 4, 1985 (age 40)
- Bats: Right Throws: Right

NPB debut
- 2009, for the Hokkaido Nippon-Ham Fighters

Career statistics (through 2015)
- Win–loss record: 11-6
- ERA: 2.87
- Strikeouts: 146
- Stats at Baseball Reference

Teams
- Hokkaido Nippon-Ham Fighters (2009–2013); Orix Buffaloes (2014–2015)

Ryo Sakakibara (榊原 諒, born August 4, 1985, in Takahama, Aichi) is a Japanese former professional baseball pitcher in Japan's Nippon Professional Baseball. He played for the Hokkaido Nippon-Ham Fighters from 2009 to 2013 and the Orix Buffaloes from 2014 to 2015.
