= Atsushi Kizuka =

Japanese baseball player and coach

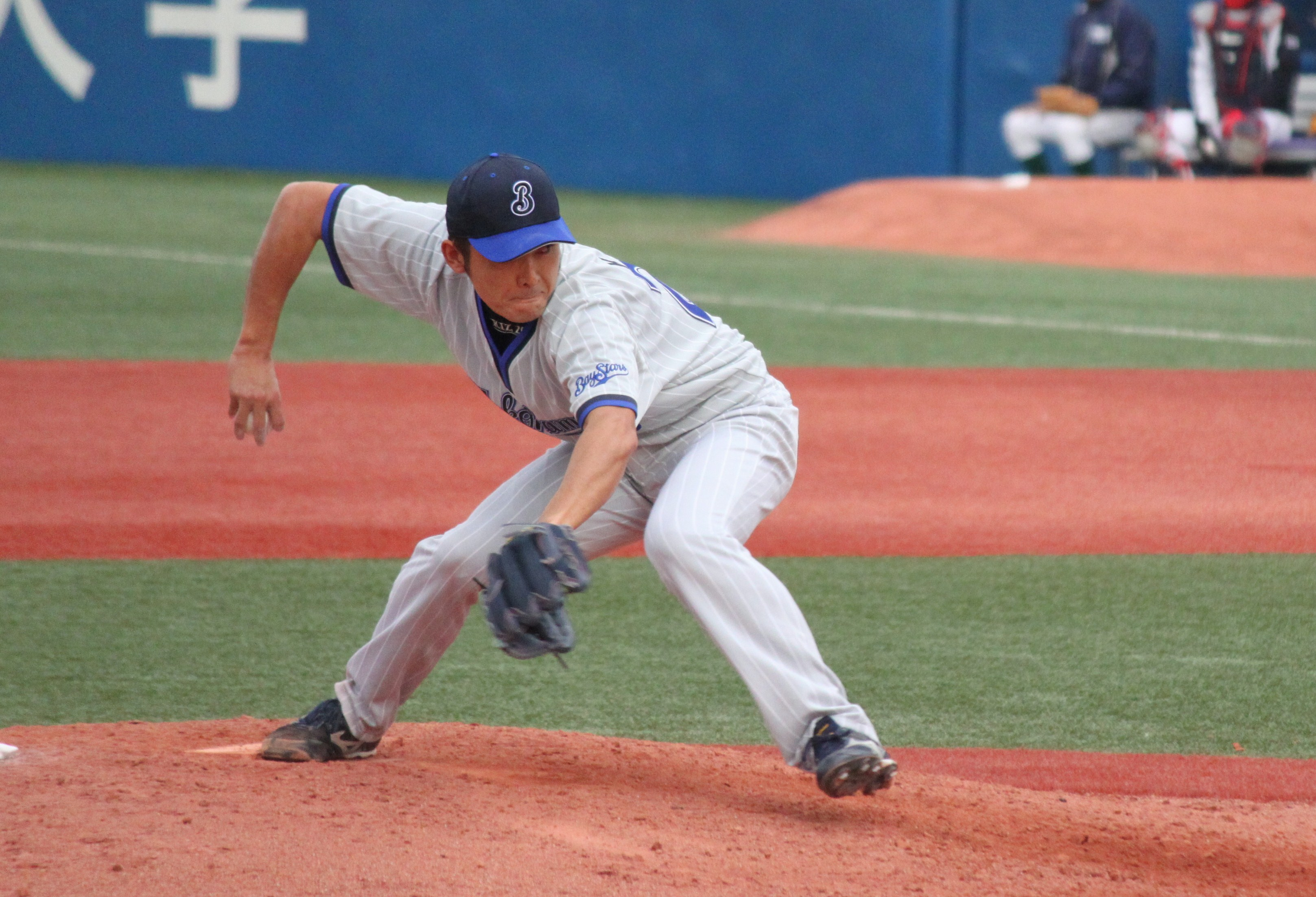
- Pitcher / Coach
- Born: July 19, 1977 (age 49); Urawa, Saitama, Saitama, Japan
- Batted: Right Threw: Right

NPB debut
- March 31, 2000, for the Yokohama BayStars

Last NPB appearance
- October 6, 2010, for the Yokohama BayStars

NPB statistics (through 2010)
- Win–loss record: 35-25
- Saves: 24
- ERA: 3.35
- Strikeouts: 367
- Stats at Baseball Reference

Teams
- As player: Yokohama BayStars (2000–2010); As coach: Yokohama BayStars/Yokohama DeNA BayStars (2011–2014, 2016–2023)

Career highlights and awards
- 1× NPB All-Star (2007); 1× Central League Middle Reliever of the Year (2001)
- Last updated on: 7 January 2024

Atsushi Kizuka (木塚 敦志, born July 19, 1977) is a former Nippon Professional Baseball pitcher. In 1998 he played for the Japan College Stars in a game against Team USA in Arizona.
