= Kōji Gotō =

Japanese baseball player and coach (born 1969)

Doosan Bears – No. 89
- Infielder / Outfielder / Coach
- Born: May 14, 1969; Ichinomiya, Aichi, Japan
- Batted: Left Threw: Right

NPB debut
- April 7, 1991, for the Yomiuri Giants

Last appearance
- October 5, 2005, for the Yomiuri Giants

NPB statistics (through 2005)
- Batting average: .263
- Hits: 332
- Home runs: 30
- Runs batted in: 119
- Stolen base: 20

Teams
- As player: Yomiuri Giants (1988–2005); As manager: Niigata Albirex Baseball Club (2007); As coach: Yomiuri Giants (2014–2017, 2020–2022); Doosan Bears (2018, 2023–present)
- Last updated on: 2 July 2024

Kōji Gotō (後藤 孝志, Gotō Kōji; born May 14, 1969) is a Japanese former Nippon Professional Baseball infielder.
