= Kodai Matsumoto =

Japanese baseball player

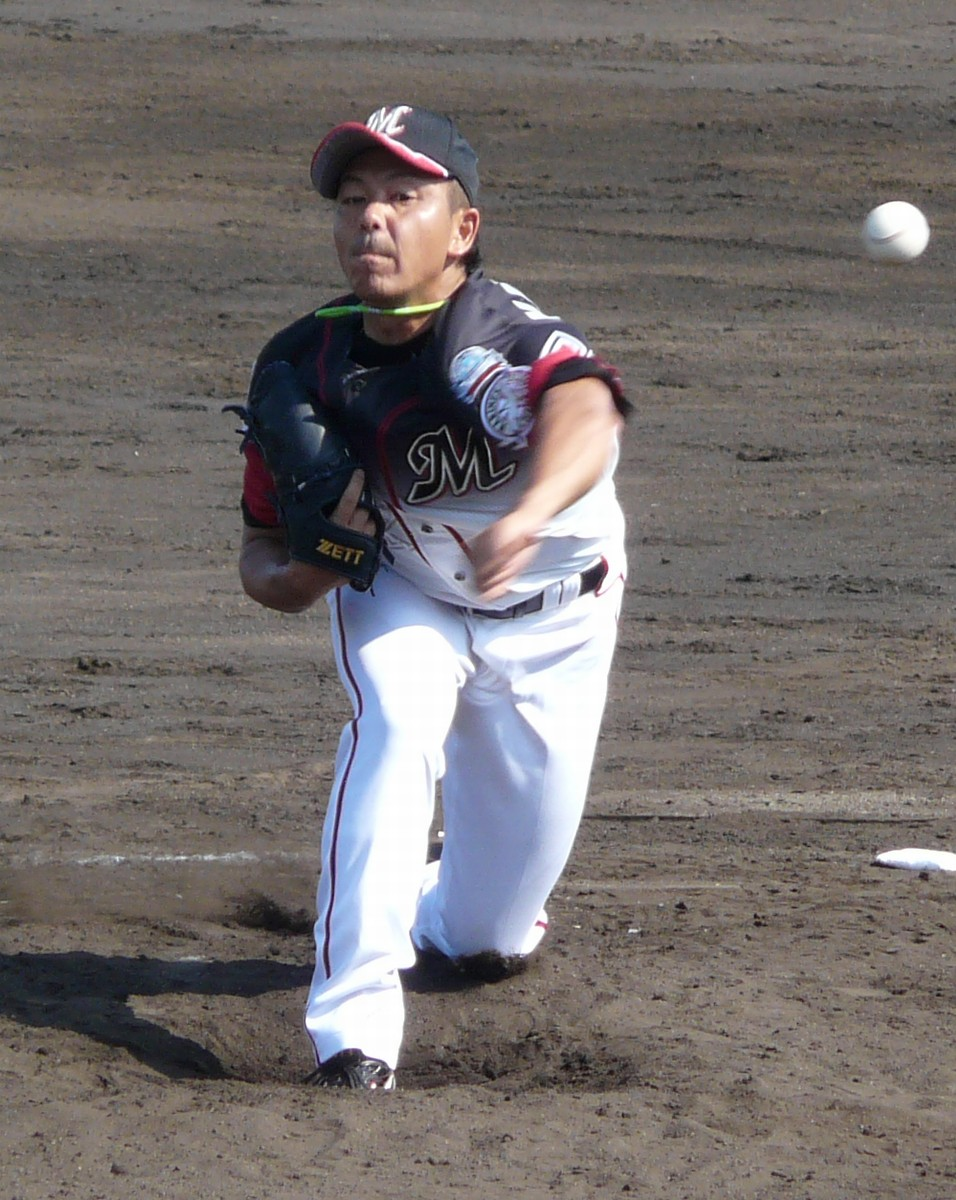
- Pitcher
- Born: December 23, 1980 (age 45)
- Batted: Left Threw: Left

NPB debut
- 2008, for the Chiba Lotte Marines

Last appearance
- 2013, for the Orix Buffaloes

NPB statistics
- Win–loss record: 1–1
- ERA: 39.90
- Strikeouts: 23
- Stats at Baseball Reference

Teams
- Chiba Lotte Marines (2008–2010, 2012); Orix Buffaloes (2013)

Kodai Matsumoto (松本 幸大, Matsumoto Kōdai; born December 23, 1980) is a Japanese former professional baseball pitcher. He played with the Chiba Lotte Marines and the Orix Buffaloes in Japan's Nippon Professional Baseball from 2008 to 2013.
