= Sho Nakata =

Japanese baseball player (born 1989)

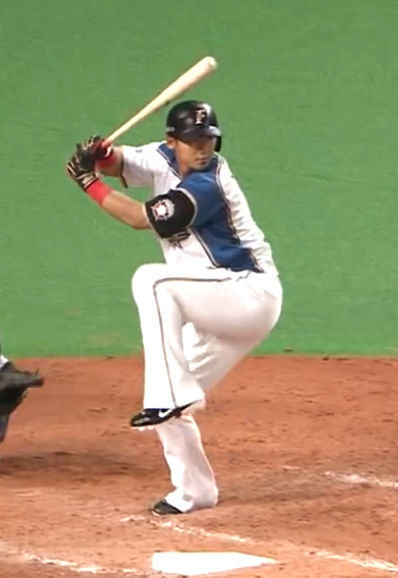
- Nakata with the Hokkaido Nippon-Ham Fighters
- First baseman, Outfielder
- Born: April 22, 1989 (age 36); Hiroshima, Hiroshima, Japan
- Batted: Right Threw: Right

NPB debut
- May 23, 2009, for the Hokkaido Nippon-Ham Fighters

Last NPB appearance
- September 19, 2025, for the Chunichi Dragons

NPB statistics
- Batting average: .248
- Hits: 1,579
- Home runs: 309
- Runs batted in: 1,087
- Stats at Baseball Reference

Teams
- Hokkaido Nippon-Ham Fighters (2009–2021); Yomiuri Giants (2021–2023); Chunichi Dragons (2024–2025)

Career highlights and awards
- NPB: 3× Pacific League RBI leader (2014, 2016, 2020); 5× Pacific League Best Nine Award (2013–2016, 2020); 5× Mitsui Golden Glove Award (2015–2016, 2018, 2020, 2022); 10× NPB All-Star (2011–2018, 2022, 2023); 2016 PLCS MVP; International: WBSC Premier12 All-World Team (2015)
Medals
Men's baseball
Representing Japan
2015 WBSC Premier12
| Bronze medal – third place | 2015 Tokyo | Team |

Sho Nakata (中田 翔, Nakata Shō; born April 22, 1989, in Hiroshima), nicknamed "Sho Time", is a Japanese professional baseball player playing for the Chunichi Dragons of the Nippon Professional Baseball (NPB). He previously played for the Yomiuri Giants and Hokkaido Nippon-Ham Fighters. He plays outfield and first base.

== Career ==
=== Early baseball career ===
As a high school student, he played as a pitcher for Osaka Toin High School and his fastball was clocked at 94 mph. In 2006, he took part in Japan's National High School Baseball Championship, but he was defeated by his opponent Yuki Saito in his second game.

Nakata was a highly hyped prospect out of high school, hitting a total of 87 home runs, a Japanese record. On November 3, 2006, during a prefectural tournament game, the 17-year-old cracked a home run that was estimated to have traveled 550' out of the park then over a couple houses before landing across the street. That shattered the old record for the park, 425' by future NPB regular Osamu Hamanaka. The Minnesota Twins, New York Mets and Seattle Mariners all expressed interest, with Seattle offering $2.5 million. Nakata turned all of them down to play in Nippon Pro Baseball.

=== Nippon-Ham Fighters ===
He was in the first pick by Hokkaido Nippon-Ham Fighters in the 2007 draft (High School Players). He succeeds the number 6, previously belongs to "Mr. Fighters" Yukio Tanaka.

He struggled in his first spring training in 2008, and was sent down to ni-gun for seasoning. He fared well, hitting .255/.339/.464 with 11 HR in 196 AB. He was five homers behind Eastern League leader Yohei Kaneko despite missing the last two months after knee surgery.

Nakata starred in the minors in 2009, tying the Eastern League RBI record (95, previously set by Corey Paul) and setting a new homer record (30, also held by Paul). He made it into 22 official games, debuting on May 23 and singling off Ricky Barrett in his first at-bat in Nippon Pro Baseball. He was 10 for 36 with two doubles, three runs, one RBI, one walk and 15 whiffs for Nippon Ham.

Nakata was moved to the outfield in 2010, but once again missed two months due to knee surgery. He hit .233/.291/.395 with 9 HR but 61 strikeouts in 210 at-bats. His first NPB homer came off Yuta Omine on July 20. He got six votes for the 2010 Pacific League Rookie of the Year Award, well back of Ryo Sakakibara's 87. He also trailed Keisuke Katto, Masahiko Morifuku and Takashi Ogino.

As a regular in 2011, Nakata hit .237/.283/.408 with 32 doubles, 18 home runs and 91 RBI. In a low-offense season, he ranked among the Pacific League leaders in many departments. He was third in RBI (behind Takeya Nakamura and Hiroyuki Nakajima), second in doubles (to Kazuo Matsui), tied for third in homers (with Aarom Baldiris, trailing Nakamura by 30 and Nobuhiro Matsuda by 7), tied for 5th in total bases (215, even with Mitsutaka Gotoh), second in sacrifice flies (8, behind Nakajima), third in strikeouts (133, one behind co-leaders Chung-Shou Yang and Nakamura), tied for 6th in double play grounders (12, even with Baldiris) and 9th in slugging (between Goto and Atsunori Inaba).

He is the first Fighters player to hit at least 20 homers over three consecutive seasons since Michihiro Ogasawara (now the 2nd team coach of the Chunichi Dragons). Together with then-rookie pitcher Shohei Ohtani, the duo were dubbed the "O-N tandem of the Heisei Era", referencing Sadaharu Oh and Shigeo Nagashima's "O-N cannon" back in their prime with the Yomiuri Giants.

Nakata was named the most valuable player of the 2016 Pacific League Climax Series.

He was selected for the 2018 NPB All-Star game.

On August 11, 2021, Nakata was suspended indefinitely for committing violence against his teammates.

=== Yomiuri Giants ===
On August 20, 2021, Nakata was traded to the Yomiuri Giants in a gratuitous trade. This trade lifted his suspension.

=== Chunichi Dragons ===
On December 3, it was reported that Nakata had signed a 2-year deal with the Chunichi Dragons.

== International career ==
Nakata played for the Japan national baseball team in the 2013 World Baseball Classic, 2013 exhibition series against Chinese Taipei, 2014 MLB Japan All-Star Series, 2015 exhibition series against Europe, 2015 WBSC Premier12, and 2017 World Baseball Classic.
