= Kazumasa Kikuchi =

Japanese baseball player

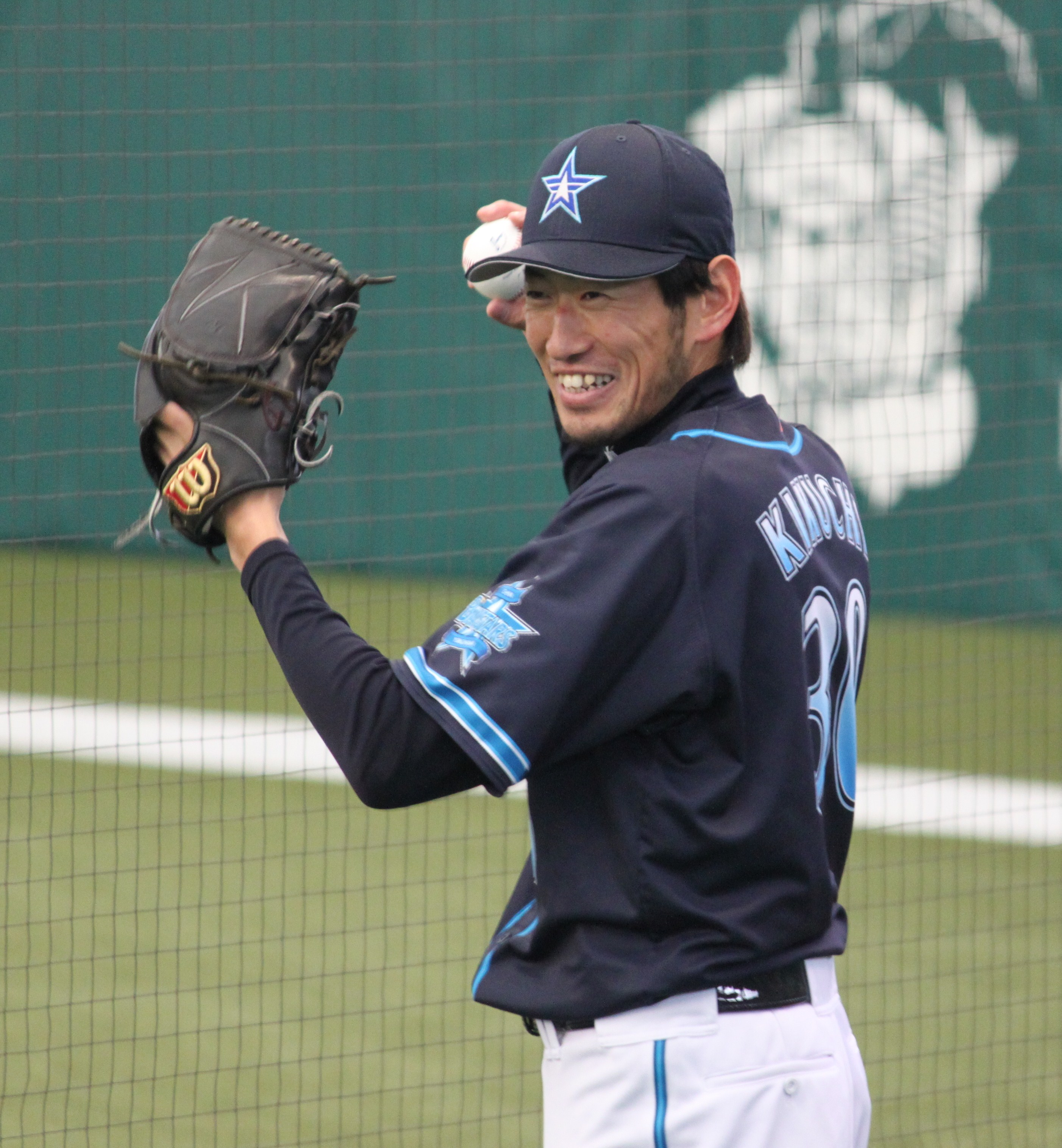
- Kikuchi with the Yokohama DeNA BayStars
- Pitcher
- Born: June 27, 1982 (age 43); Takasaki, Gunma, Japan
- Batted: Right Threw: Right

NPB debut
- September 25, 2005, for the Hokkaido Nippon-Ham Fighters

Last NPB appearance
- April 9, 2014, for the Yokohama DeNA BayStars

NPB statistics
- Win–loss record: 9–7
- Earned run average: 3.54
- Strikeouts: 114

Teams
- Hokkaido Nippon-Ham Fighters (2005–2011); Yokohama DeNA BayStars (2012–2014)

Kazumasa Kikuchi (菊地 和正, Kikuchi Kazumasa; born June 27, 1982) is a Japanese former professional baseball pitcher. He played in Nippon Professional Baseball (NPB) for the Hokkaido Nippon-Ham Fighters and Yokohama DeNA BayStars.
