= Shintaro Ejiri =

Japanese baseball player

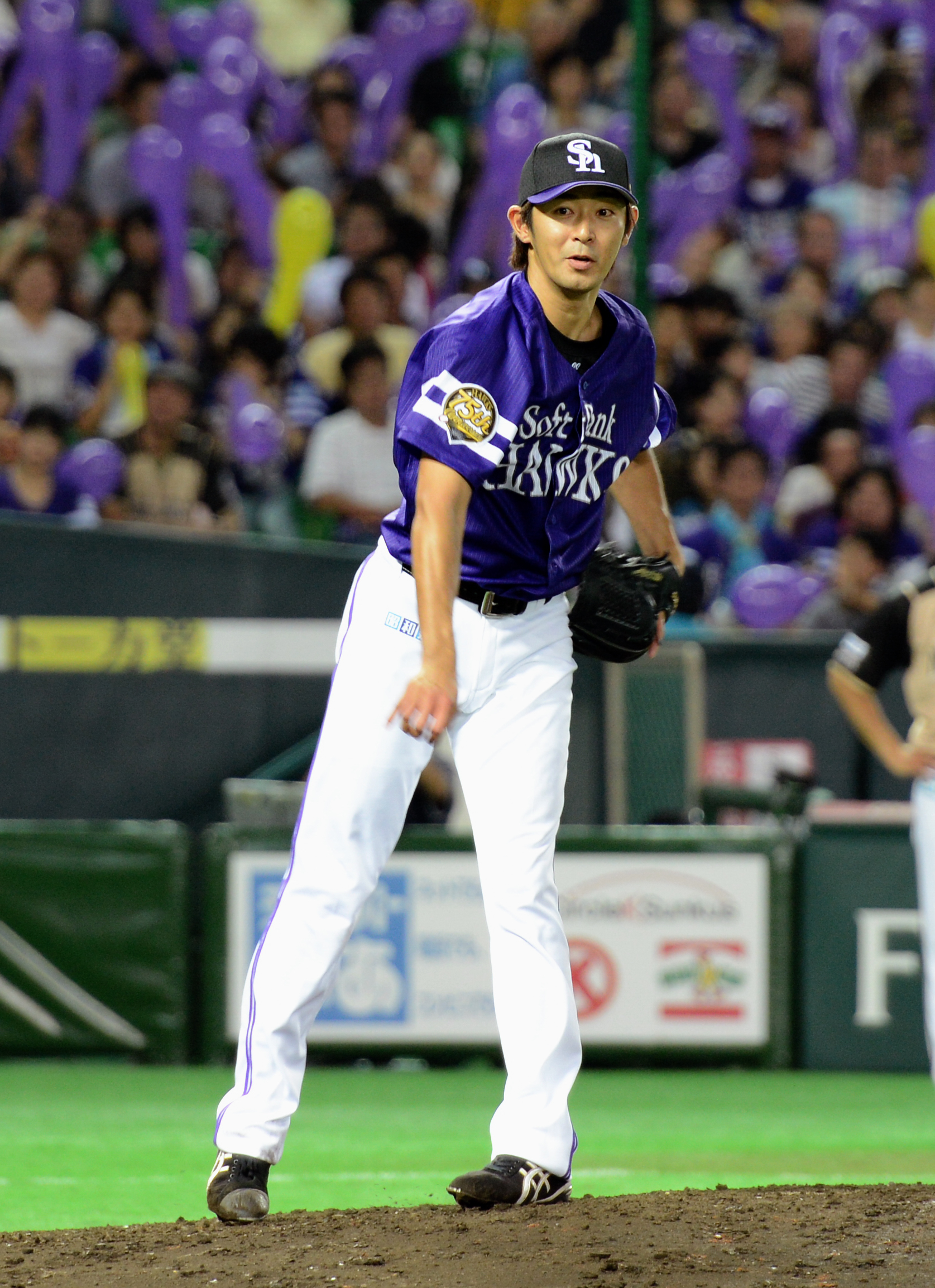
- pitcher
- Born: April 30, 1977 (age 48); Sendai, Miyagi, Japan
- Batted: Right Threw: Right

debut
- October 5, 2002, for the Nippon-Ham Fighters

Last appearance
- August 15, 2014, for the Fukuoka SoftBank Hawks

NPB statistics (through 2014 season)
- Win–loss record: 28-20
- ERA: 4.38
- Strikeouts: 278
- Saves: 1
- Holds: 53

Teams
- Nippon-Ham Fighters/Hokkaido Nippon-Ham Fighters (2002–2010); Yokohama BayStars/Yokohama DeNA BayStars (2010–2012); Fukuoka SoftBank Hawks (2013–2014)

Shintaro Ejiri (江尻 慎太郎, Ejiri Shintaro; born April 30, 1977 in Sendai, Miyagi, Japan) is a professional Japanese baseball player. He plays pitcher for the Fukuoka SoftBank Hawks.
