= Yoshinori Tateyama =

Japanese baseball player (born 1975)

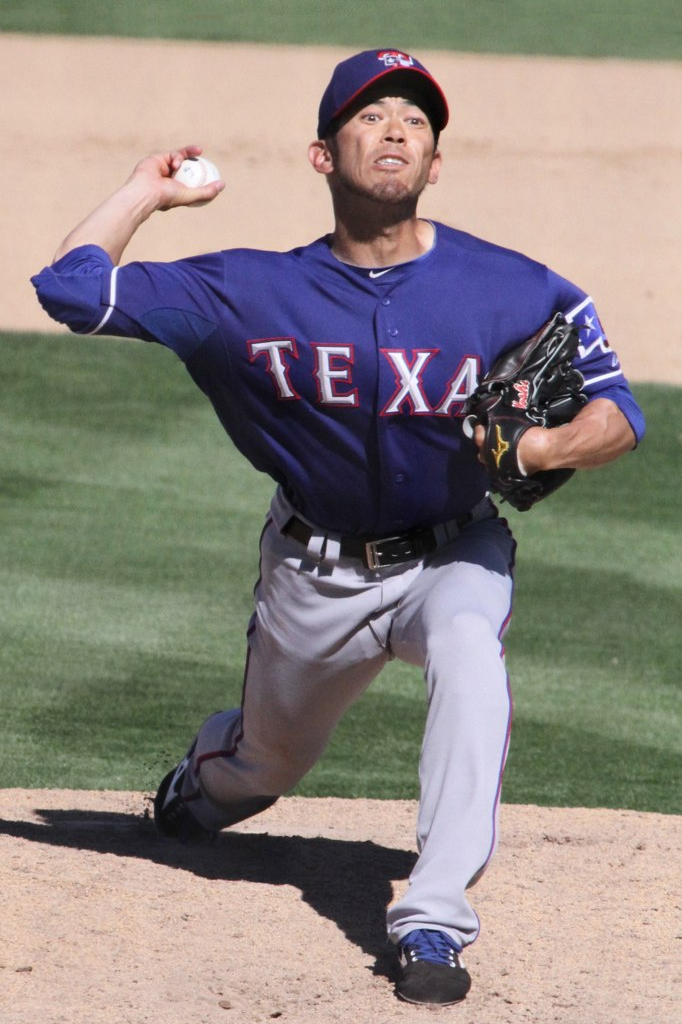
- Tateyama with the Texas Rangers in 2013
- Pitcher / Coach
- Born: December 26, 1975 (age 50); Daitō, Osaka, Japan
- Batted: Right Threw: Right

Professional debut
- NPB: May 3, 1999, for the Nippon-Ham Fighters
- MLB: May 24, 2011, for the Texas Rangers

Last appearance
- NPB: August 14, 2014, for the Hanshin Tigers
- MLB: September 26, 2012, for the Texas Rangers

NPB statistics
- Win–loss record: 35–43
- Earned run average: 3.43
- Strikeouts: 491

MLB statistics
- Win–loss record: 3–0
- Earned run average: 5.75
- Strikeouts: 61
- Stats at Baseball Reference

Teams
- As player: Nippon-Ham Fighters / Hokkaido Nippon-Ham Fighters (1999–2010); Texas Rangers (2011–2012); Hanshin Tigers (2014); As coach: Hokkaido Nippon-Ham Fighters (2023–2024); Chiba Lotte Marines (2025)

Yoshinori Tateyama (建山 義紀, Tateyama Yoshinori; born December 26, 1975) is a Japanese former professional baseball pitcher. He played in Major League Baseball (MLB) for the Texas Rangers, and in Nippon Professional Baseball (NPB) for the Hokkaido Nippon-Ham Fighters and the Hanshin Tigers.

== Playing career ==
=== Hokkaido Nippon-Ham Fighters ===
Tateyama began his professional career in 1999 with the Hokkaido Nippon-Ham Fighters of Nippon Professional Baseball, pitching for the team through the 2010 season. In 438 appearances for the team mainly in relief, he tossed 661 2/3 innings, compiling a 35–43 record and 3.43 ERA with 488 strikeouts.

=== Texas Rangers ===
On November 30, 2010, Tateyama signed as a free agent with the Texas Rangers. After starting 2011 with the Triple–A Round Rock Express, he was called up to the major leagues on May 23, 2011, and made his major league debut the following day. Tateyama struck out Carlos Quentin swinging for his first major league strikeout. On May 28, Tateyama recorded his one and only MLB save during a 10–1 Rangers victory over the Kansas City Royals.

Koji Uehara was his teammate in high school. In that time, Tateyama was an ace pitcher and Uehara was an outfielder. In the 2011–2012 offseason, the Rangers signed Japan's best starting pitcher Yu Darvish to a 5-year deal. Tateyama and Darvish were previously teammates for 5 seasons on the Hokkaido Nippon-Ham Fighters. Tateyama made 14 appearances for the Rangers in 2012, struggling to a 9.00 ERA with 18 strikeouts over 17 innings pitched. He became a free agent on October 30, 2012, when the Rangers declined his option for the 2013 season.

On December 20, 2012, Tateyama re–signed with the Rangers on a minor league contract. He was released prior to the season on March 21, 2013, and re–signed with the organization on a minor league contract two days later. In 23 appearances for Triple–A Round Rock, Tateyama compiled a 4.24 ERA with 44 strikeouts across 34 innings of work.

=== New York Yankees ===
On June 21, 2013, Tateyama was traded to the New York Yankees in exchange for future considerations. In 21 games for the Triple–A Scranton/Wilkes-Barre RailRiders, he worked to a 2–2 record and 1.70 ERA with 42 strikeouts over 42 1/3 innings pitched. Tateyama elected free agency following the season on November 4, 2013.

On December 25, 2013, Tateyama re–signed with the Yankees organization on a minor league contract. He made 9 appearances for Scranton in 2014, recording a 6.08 ERA with 17 strikeouts across 13 1/3 innings. On May 9, 2014, Tateyama was released by the Yankees organization.

=== Hanshin Tigers ===
Tateyama subsequently returned to Japan to sign with the Hanshin Tigers of Nippon Professional Baseball on June 25, 2014. He made 8 appearances for the Tigers, registering a 3.68 ERA with 3 strikeouts across 7 1/3 innings pitched. On November 1, Tateyama announced his retirement from professional baseball.

== Coaching career ==
After his retirement, Tateyama became Japan national baseball team pitching coach at the 2017 Asia Professional Baseball Championship, 2018 exhibition game against Australia, 2018 U-23 Baseball World Cup and 2018 MLB Japan All-Star Series.

== Pitching style ==
A sidearm pitcher, Tateyama relied chiefly on a sinking fastball that averaged 87–88 mph and a curveball in the low 70s. He also featured two other off-speed pitches, a changeup (74–78 mph) and a screwball (68–71 mph), that were used mostly against left-handed batters. The screwball is thrown with a "Vulcan" grip. He was one of only two relief pitchers to have thrown even a single screwball in the 2012 MLB season.

While his strikeout totals were average, he got hitters out with his control (career 2.11 BB/9 in NPB).
