= Taiyo Fujita =

Japanese baseball player (born 1979)

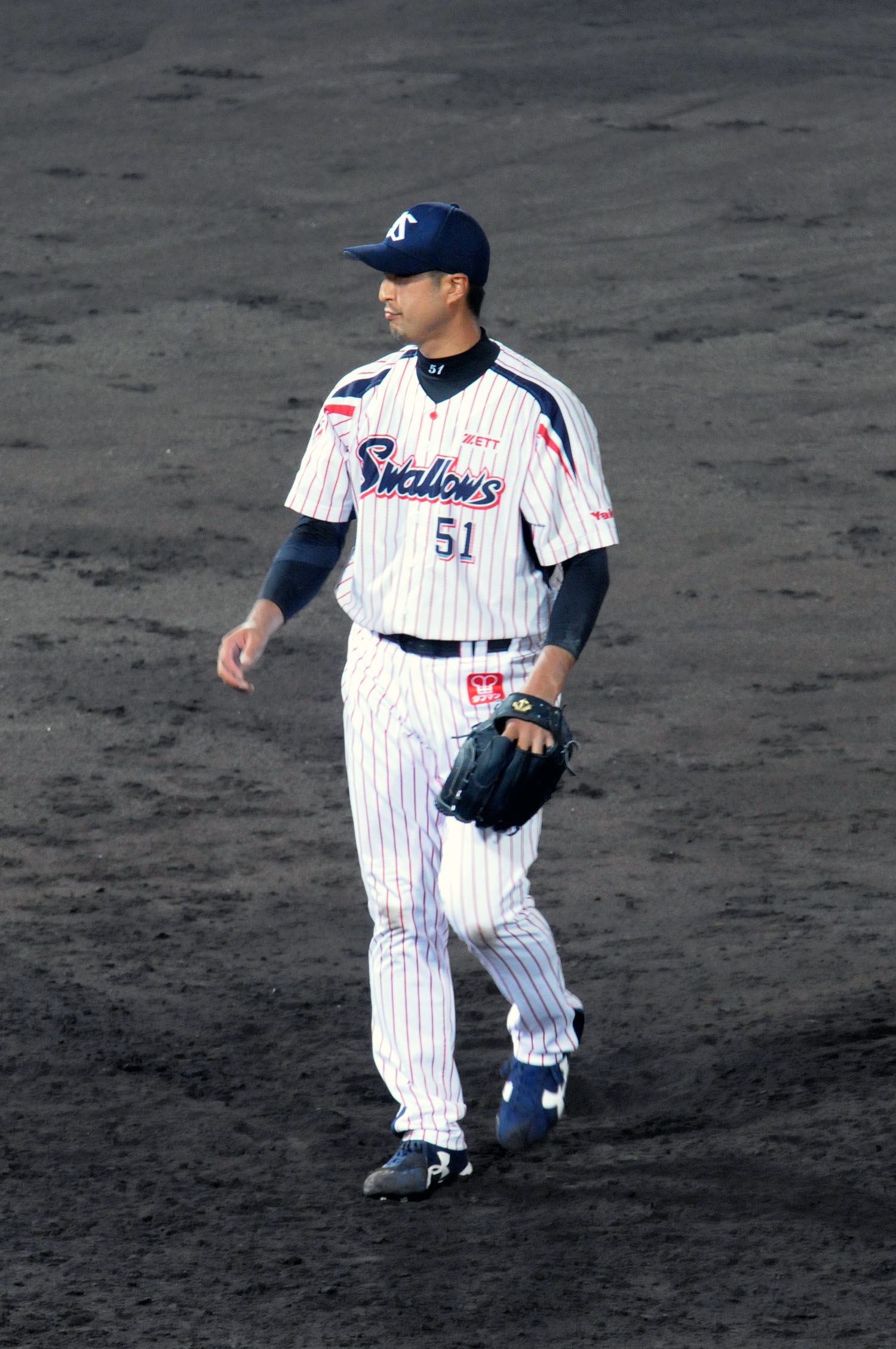
- Pitcher
- Born: November 1, 1979 (age 46); Akita, Akita, Japan
- Bats: Right Throws: Right

debut
- March 30, 2001, for the Hanshin Tigers

Teams
- Hanshin Tigers (2001–2009); Saitama Seibu Lions (2009–2012); Tokyo Yakult Swallows (2013)

Taiyo Fujita (藤田 太陽, Fujita Taiyō; born November 1, 1979 in Akita, Akita, Japan) is a professional Japanese baseball player.
