= Hideki Sunaga =

Japanese baseball player

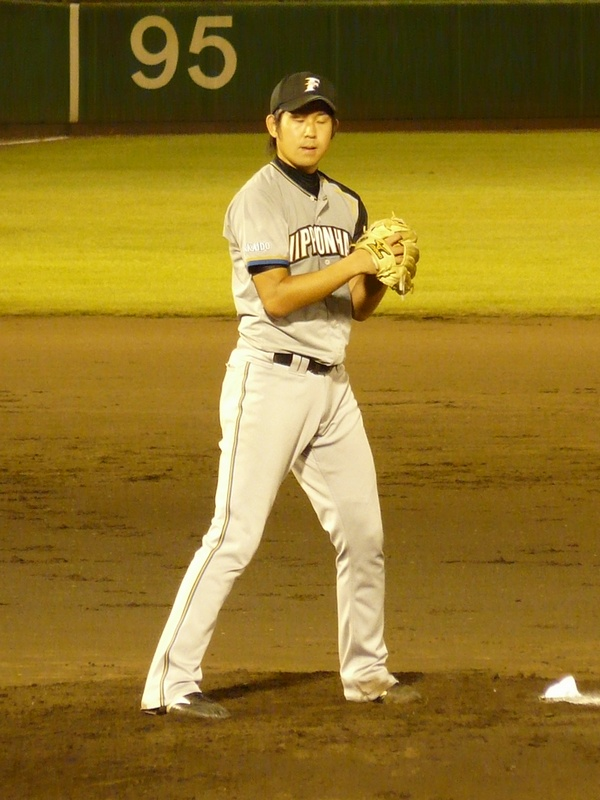
- Pitcher
- Born: October 28, 1985 (age 41); Arakawa, Tokyo, Japan
- Bats: Left Throws: Left

debut
- June 6, 2004, for the Hokkaido Nippon-Ham Fighters
- Stats at Baseball Reference

Teams
- Hokkaido Nippon-Ham Fighters (2004–2010, 2015–2016); Yomiuri Giants (2011–2015)

Hideki Sunaga (須永 英輝, Sunaga Hideki; born October 28, 1985) is a professional Japanese baseball player. He plays pitcher for the Hokkaido Nippon-Ham Fighters.
