= Tomohiro Nioka =

Japanese baseball player (born 1976)

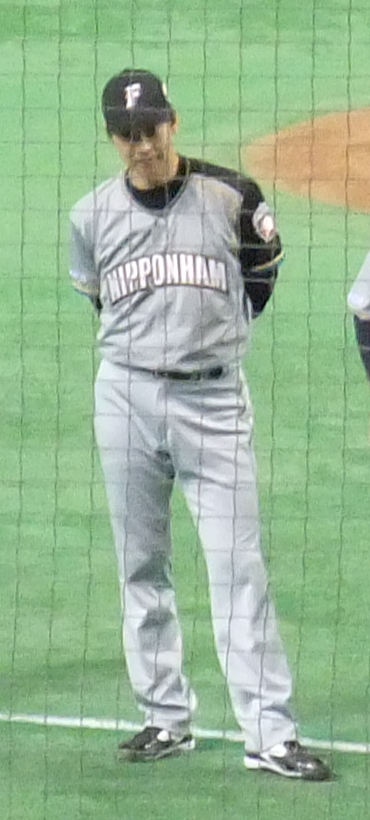
- Infielder/Coach
- Batted: Right Threw: Right

debut
- April 2, 1999, for the Yomiuri Giants

Last appearance
- September 1, 2013, for the Hokkaido Nippon-Ham Fighters

Career statistics
- Batting average: .282
- Home runs: 173
- Runs batted in: 622
- Stats at Baseball Reference

Teams
- As player: Yomiuri Giants (1999–2008); Hokkaido Nippon-Ham Fighters (2009–2013); As manager: Toyama GRN Thunderbirds (2019); As coach: Yomiuri Giants (2016–2018, 2020–2025)

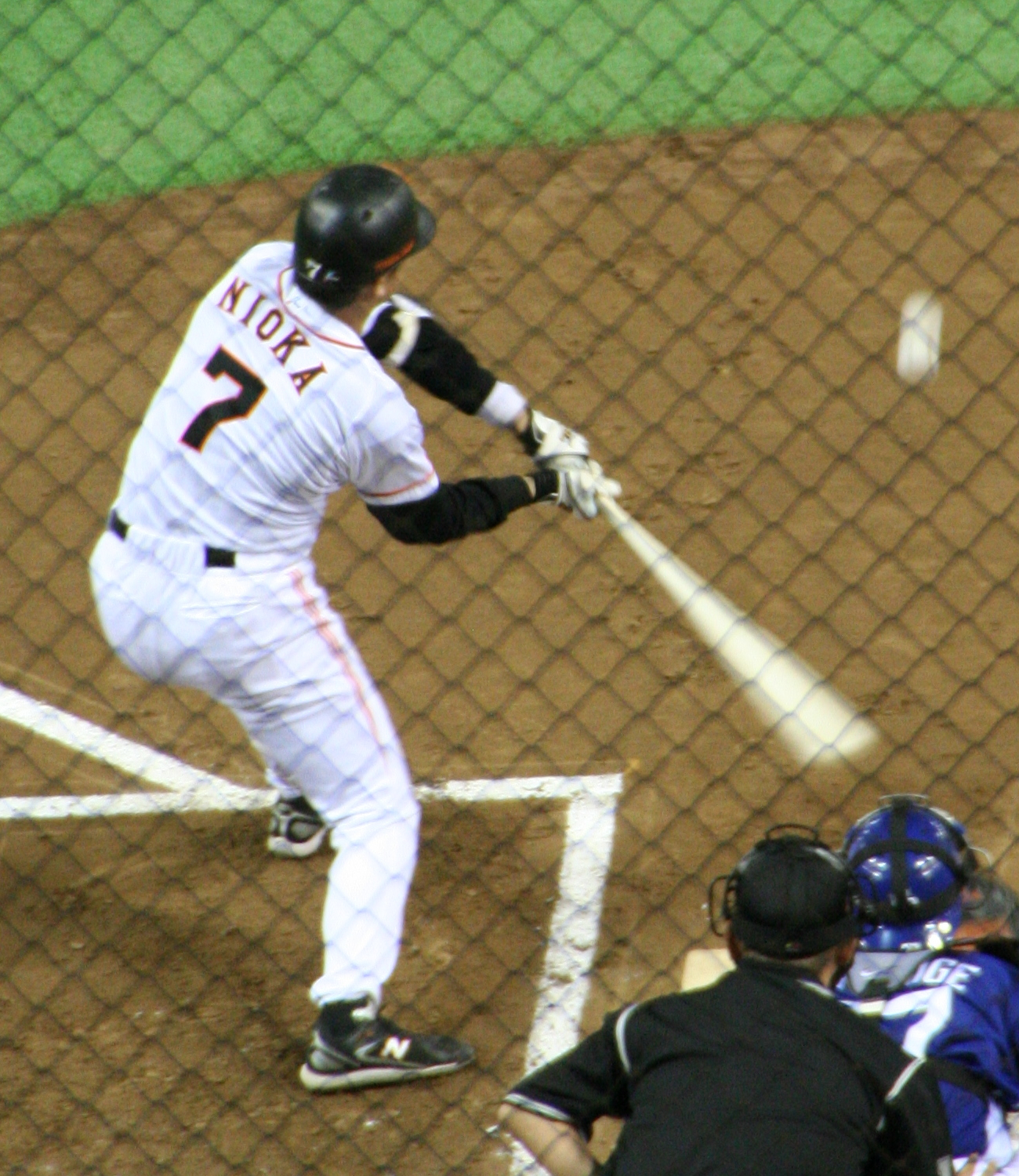
Nioka batting for the Yomiuri Giants in 2007.

Tomohiro Nioka (二岡 智宏, born April 29, 1976, in Miyoshi, Hiroshima, Japan) is a Japanese former professional baseball player. He previously played for the Yomiuri Giants and Hokkaido Nippon-Ham Fighters. Nioka batted and threw right-handed.

== Japanese career ==
=== Early career ===
Tomohiro Nioka was the second draft pick of the Yomiuri Giants in 1999. He made his pro debut that year, playing in 126 games and hitting .289. The following season he played in 119 games, hit 10 home runs, and collected 32 runs batted in. Nioka played in only 86 games in 2001, and played in 112 in 2002. He hit 24 homers (which set a Giants record for his position) and compiled a .281 average in the 2002 season. The Giants won the championship in 2002, and Nioka won the Japan Series Most Valuable Player Award.

=== Career year ===
Tomohiro had a career season in 2003. He played in 140 games, and hit .300, the first .300 season of his career. Nioka also recorded career highs in hits (172), home runs (29), stolen bases (14) and runs scored (88). Nioka played a large part in keeping the Giants out of the cellar that year by hitting many home runs that helped snap losing skids, including a home run on September 18 that helped the Giants win, 5 to 3, and end a 9-game losing streak. The Giants tied for 3rd place in 2003.

=== 2004-2013 ===
In 2004, Tomohiro appeared in only 91 games, but still managed to collect 88 hits. He had a strong comeback year in 2005, hitting 16 dingers and driving in 58 runs. Nioka hit .301 in 2005, a new career high. In 2006, he reached the 20-home run mark for the third time by sending 25 over the fence.

In 2007, Nioka hit .295, hit 20 home runs, and set a career high in RBI with 83. He played at both short and third base in '07.

On November 14, 2008, Nioka and Masanori Hayashi were acquired by the Hokkaido Nippon Ham Fighters for Takahito Kudo and Micheal Nakamura.

== MLB rumors ==
It was rumored over the 2007 Major League Baseball offseason that Nioka, a free agent after the '07 season, was interested in playing in the big leagues. He was quoted as saying "I'd most definitely consider playing in the Major Leagues" in 2003. It was reported that possible destinations for Nioka might be the Chicago White Sox, Toronto Blue Jays, Tampa Bay Rays, San Francisco Giants, or St. Louis Cardinals.

== Love hotel scandal ==
In July 2008, the Japanese tabloid weekly Josei Seven reported, with pictures, that Nioka, who is married, had gone to a love hotel with TV announcer Mona Yamamoto. The two met by chance at a gay bar in Shinjuku ni-chōme, Tokyo and, according to the newspaper, traveled to the hotel after drinking and conversing for several hours. The incident received widespread press attention in Japan.
