= Keisuke Tanimoto =

Japanese baseball player

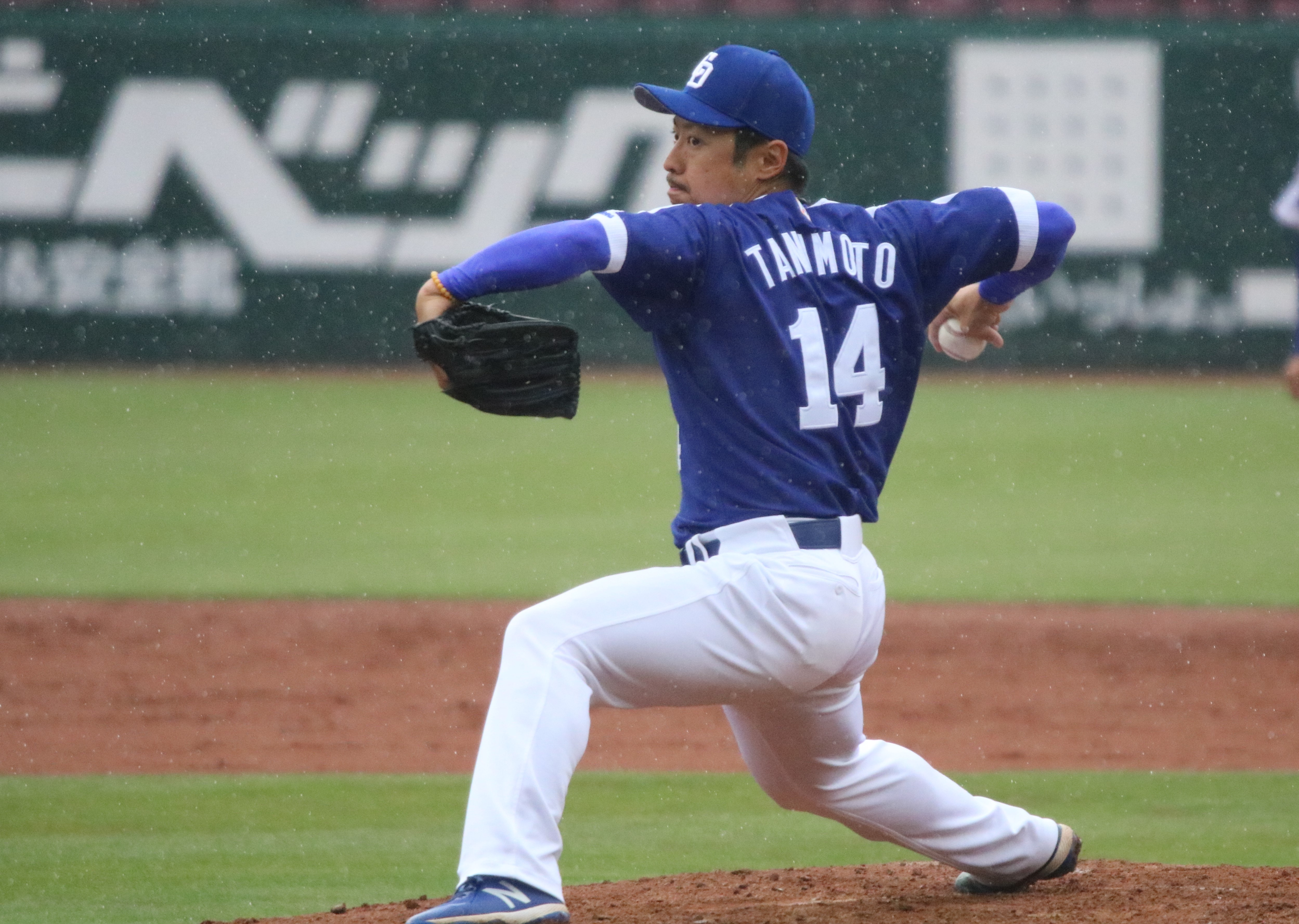
- Pitcher
- Born: January 28, 1985 (age 41); Suzuka, Mie, Japan
- Batted: Right Threw: Right

NPB debut
- April 4, 2009, for the Hokkaido Nippon-Ham Fighters

Last NPB appearance
- October 3, 2023, for the Chunichi Dragons

NPB statistics
- Win–loss record: 28-25
- ERA: 3.57
- Strikeouts: 455
- Holds: 154
- Saves: 7
- Stats at Baseball Reference

Teams
- Hokkaido Nippon-Ham Fighters (2009–2017); Chunichi Dragons (2017–2023)

Keisuke Tanimoto (谷元 圭介, Tanimoto Keisuke; born January 1, 1985) is a Japanese Nippon Professional Baseball pitcher for the Chunichi Dragons in Japan's Central League.

He previously played at the Hokkaido Nippon Ham Fighters and was traded to the Dragons on the 31 July 2017 for cash considerations.
