= Ricky Barrett =

American baseball player (born 1981)

- Relief pitcher
- Born: March 9, 1981 (age 45); Sacramento, California, U.S.
- Batted: Left Threw: Left

NPB debut
- April 15, 2009, for the Tokyo Yakult Swallows

Last NPB appearance
- August 14, 2009, for the Tokyo Yakult Swallows

NPB statistics
- Win–loss record: 0–1
- Earned run average: 7.15
- Strikeouts: 5
- Stats at Baseball Reference

Teams
- Tokyo Yakult Swallows (2009)

William Domingos Barrett (born March 9, 1981) is an American former professional baseball pitcher. He was selected by the Minnesota Twins in the 7th round (212th overall) of the 2002 Major League Baseball draft. He bats and throws left-handed.

He pitched for McClatchy High School (Sacramento) in the Sac-Joaquin section championship game in 1998, his junior year, defeating Vallejo High School and future major league pitching star, then a high school senior, CC Sabathia, to win the championship. Barrett went on to attend the University of California, San Diego and the University of San Diego. In 2000, he played collegiate summer baseball with the Yarmouth–Dennis Red Sox of the Cape Cod Baseball League. He was selected by Minnesota in the 7th round of the 2002 MLB draft.

Barrett spent three years working his way up through Rookie leagues and Single-A. In 2005, he pitched most of the season for the Rochester Red Wings, the Twins Triple-A affiliate. In 2006, he pitched in 27 games putting up a record of 5-1 and an ERA of 3.42. In 2007, Barrett pitched in 22 games, starting 1, going 2-1 with a 4.11 ERA. He became a free agent at the end of the 2008 season.

Barrett signed with the Tokyo Yakult Swallows of Japan's Central League for the 2009 season. He last played for the Southern Maryland Blue Crabs of the Atlantic League of Professional Baseball in 2012.
