= Hisashi Takeda =

Japanese baseball player

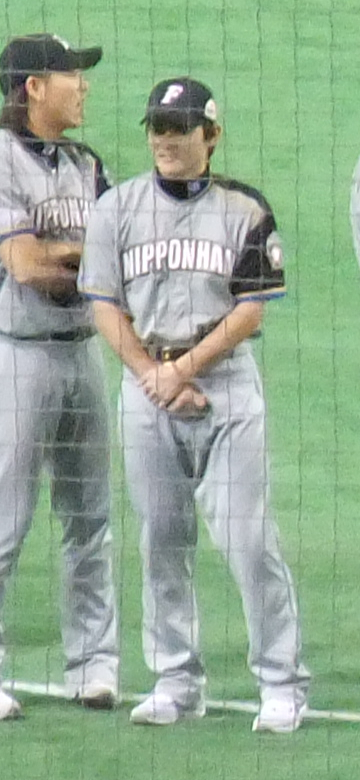
- Takeda with the Hokkaido Nippon Ham Fighters

Hokkaido Nippon-Ham Fighters – No. 73
- Pitcher / Coach
- Born: October 14, 1978 (age 47); Tokushima, Japan
- Batted: Left Threw: Right

NPB debut
- April 27, 2003, for the Nippon-Ham Fighters

Last appearance
- May 5, 2017, for the Hokkaido Nippon-Ham Fighters

NPB statistics (through 2017)
- Win–loss record: 31–30
- Earned run average: 2.61
- Strikeouts: 368
- Saves: 167
- Stats at Baseball Reference

Teams
- As player: Nippon-Ham Fighters/Hokkaido Nippon-Ham Fighters (2003–2017); As coach': Japan Express; Tokai REX Japan Steel; Hokkaido Nippon-Ham Fighters (2024–present)

Career highlights and awards
- 1× Pacific League Middle Reliever of the Year (2006); 3× Pacific League Saves Champion (2009, 2011, 2012); 2× Japan Series champion (2006, 2016); 6× NPB All-Star (2006-2009, 2011, 2012)

Hisashi Takeda (武田 久, Takeda Hisashi; born October 14, 1978) is a Japanese Nippon Professional Baseball pitcher with the Hokkaido Nippon-Ham Fighters in Japan's Pacific League.
