= Naoki Miyanishi =

Japanese baseball player (born 1985)

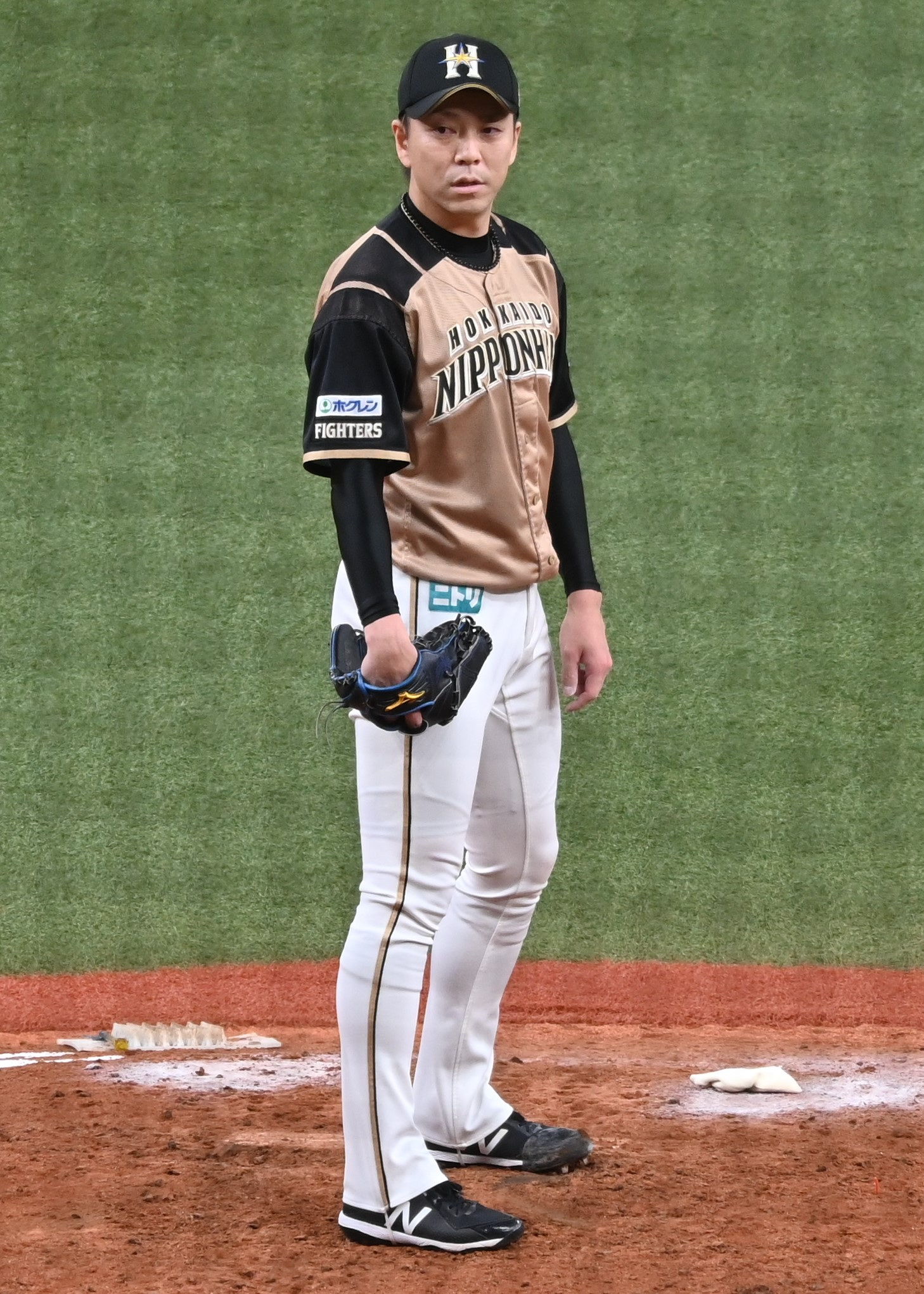

Hokkaido Nippon Ham Fighters – No. 25
- Pitcher
- Born: June 2, 1985 (age 41); Nishinomiya, Japan
- Bats: Left Throws: Left

NPB debut
- March 25, 2008, for the Hokkaido Nippon-Ham Fighters

NPB statistics (through 2025 season)
- Win–loss record: 38–42
- Earned run average: 2.51
- Strikeouts: 684
- Holds: 424
- Saves: 13
- Stats at Baseball Reference

Teams
- Hokkaido Nippon-Ham Fighters (2008–present)

Career highlights and awards
- 3× NPB All-Star (2015, 2018, 2019); 3× Pacific League Most Valuable Setup Pitcher (2016, 2018, 2019)
Medals
Representing Japan
Men's baseball
Asian Games
Silver medal – second place	2006 Doha	Team

Naoki Miyanishi (宮西 尚生, Miyanishi Naoki; born June 2, 1985 in Nishinomiya, Japan) is a Japanese professional baseball pitcher for the Hokkaido Nippon-Ham Fighters of Nippon Professional Baseball (NPB).

== Career ==
Miyanashi was selected to play in the 2018 NPB All-Star game.

On August 4, 2024, Miyanishi became the first pitcher in Nippon Professional Baseball history to reach 400 holds.
