= Shugo Fujii =

Japanese baseball player (born 1977)

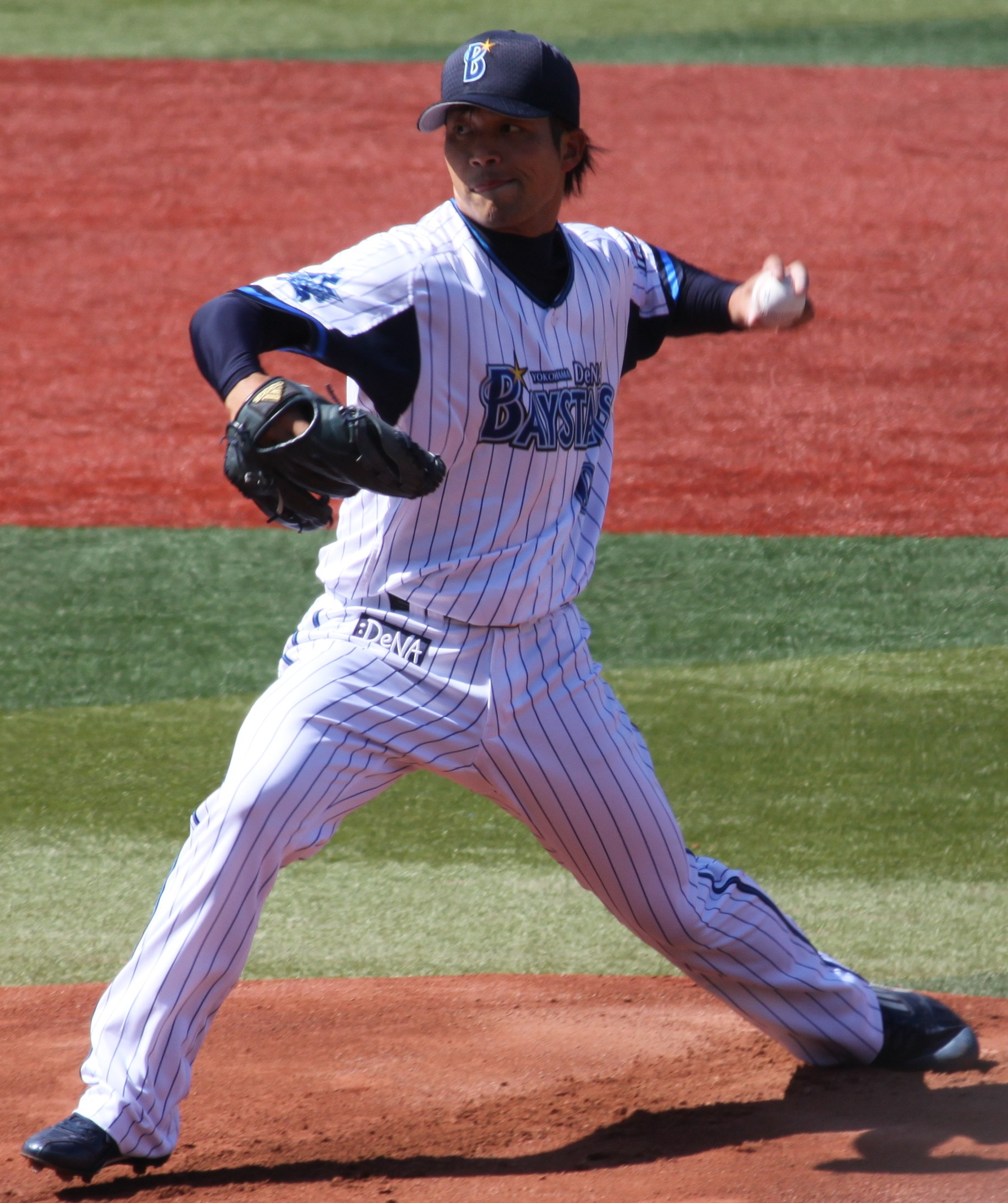
- Pitcher
- Born: May 12, 1977 (age 48); Iyo, Ehime, Japan
- Batted: Left Threw: Left

NPB debut
- April 1, 2000, for the Yakult Swallows

Last NPB appearance
- 2013, for the Yokohama DeNA BayStars

NPB statistics (through 2014)
- Win–loss record: 83-81
- Saves: 0
- ERA: 3.77
- Strikeouts: 1064

Teams
- Yakult Swallows/Tokyo Yakult Swallows (2000–2007); Hokkaido Nippon-Ham Fighters (2008–2009); Yomiuri Giants (2010–2011); Yokohama DeNA BayStars (2012–2014)

Career highlights and awards
- 2001 Central League Win Champion; 2001 Central League MVP for Pitcher; 2001 NPB Best Nine Award; Japan Series champion (2001); 2× NPB All-Star (2001, 2005)

Shugo Fujii (藤井 秀悟, Fujii Shūgo; born May 12, 1977 in Iyo, Ehime, Japan) is a former Nippon Professional Baseball pitcher.
