= Keisaku Itokazu =

Japanese baseball player

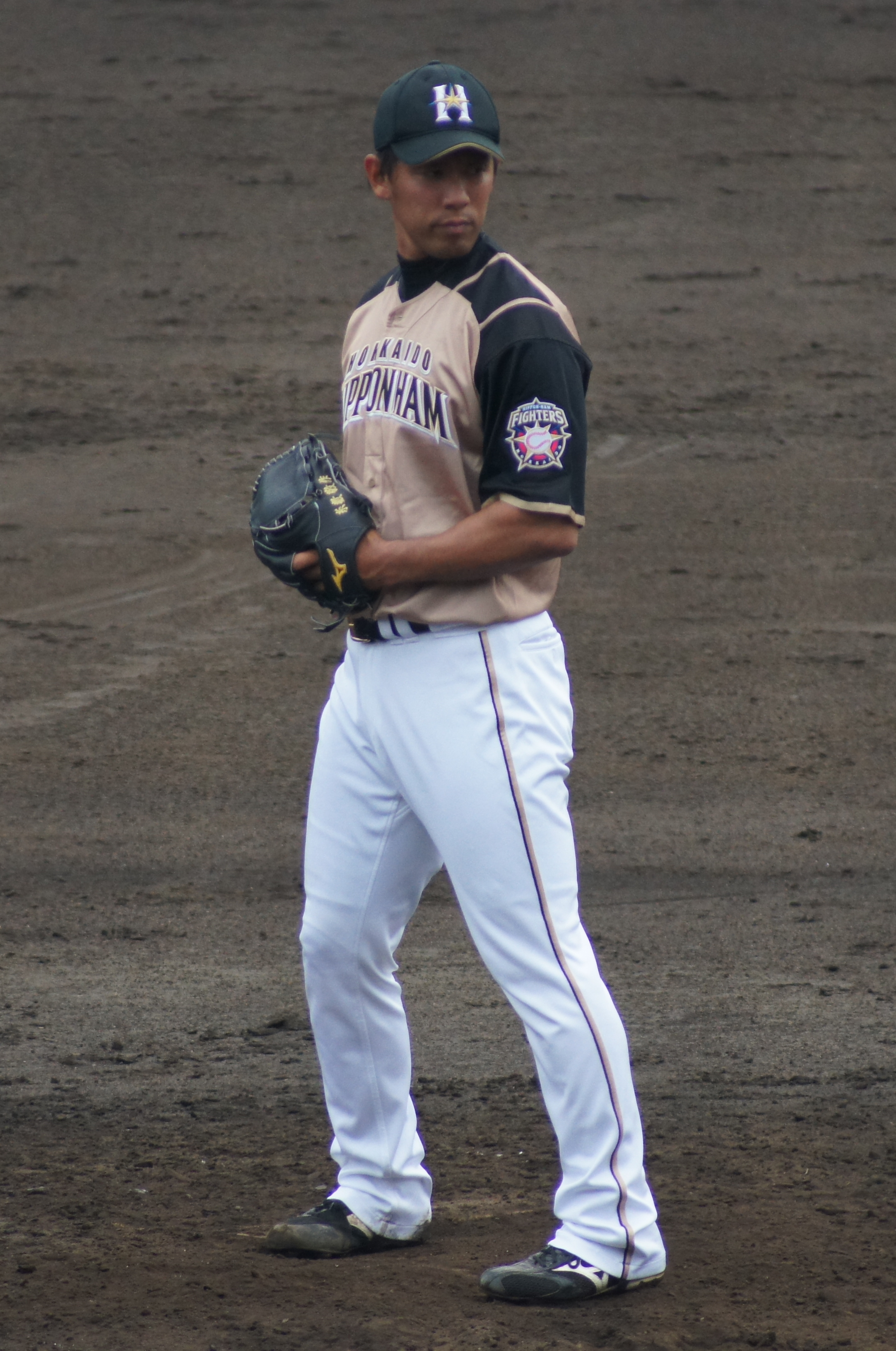
- Pitcher
- Born: November 7, 1984 (age 41)
- Bats: Right Throws: Right

NPB debut
- 2009, for the Hokkaido Nippon-Ham Fighters

Career statistics (through 2012)
- Win–loss record: 8–8
- ERA: 5.12
- Strikeouts: 74
- Stats at Baseball Reference

Teams
- Hokkaido Nippon-Ham Fighters (2009–2012)

Keisaku Itokazu (糸数 敬作, born November 7, 1984) is a Japanese former professional baseball pitcher in Japan's Nippon Professional Baseball. He played for the Hokkaido Nippon-Ham Fighters from 2009 to 2012.
