= Masaru Takeda =

Japanese baseball player (born 1978)

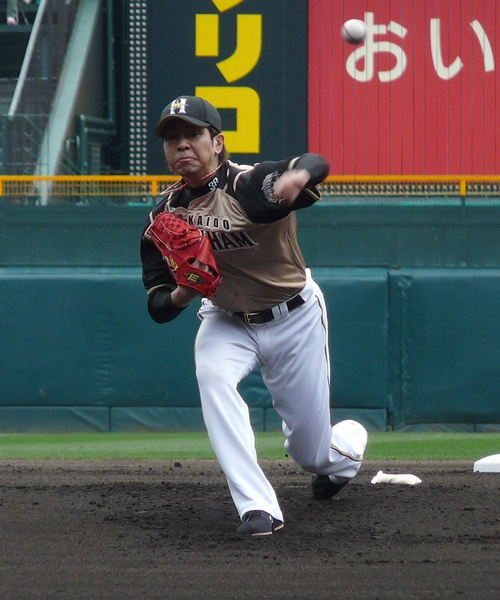

Oisix Niigata Albirex – No. 38
- Pitcher / Coach
- Born: July 10, 1978 (age 47); Nagoya, Japan
- Batted: Left Threw: Left

NPB debut
- March 26, 2006, for the Hokkaido Nippon-Ham Fighters

Last NPB appearance
- September 30, 2016, for the Hokkaido Nippon-Ham Fighters

Career statistics
- Win–loss record: 82–61
- ERA: 3.02
- Strikeouts: 701
- Stats at Baseball Reference

Teams
- As player: Hokkaido Nippon-Ham Fighters (2006–2016); As manager: Ishikawa Million Stars (2017–2019); As coach: Hokkaido Nippon-Ham Fighters (2020–2022)

Masaru Takeda (武田 勝, born July 10, 1978, in Nagoya) is a Japanese former professional baseball pitcher and coach. He played in Nippon Professional Baseball (NPB) for the Hokkaido Nippon-Ham Fighters from 2006 to 2016.
