= Tomoya Yagi =

Japanese baseball player

- Pitcher
- Born: November 7, 1983 (age 42); Hodogaya-ku, Yokohama, Kanagawa, Japan
- Bats: Left Throws: Left

NPB debut
- 2006, for the Hokkaido Nippon-Ham Fighters

Career statistics (through 2016)
- Win–loss record: 39-34
- ERA: 3.69
- Strikeouts: 361
- Stats at Baseball Reference

Teams
- Hokkaido Nippon-Ham Fighters (2006–2012); Orix Buffaloes (2013–2014); Chunichi Dragons (2015–2017)

Career highlights and awards
- 2006 Central League Rookie of the Year; 1× NPB All-Star (2006)
- Last updated on: 6 October 2016

Tomoya Yagi (八木 智哉, born November 7, 1983, in Yokohama) is a Japanese former professional baseball pitcher in Japan's Nippon Professional Baseball. He won the Pacific League Rookie of the Year Award in 2006. He played for the Hokkaido Nippon-Ham Fighters, Orix Buffaloes, and Chunichi Dragons from 2006 to 2017.
