= Masanori Hayashi =

Japanese baseball player

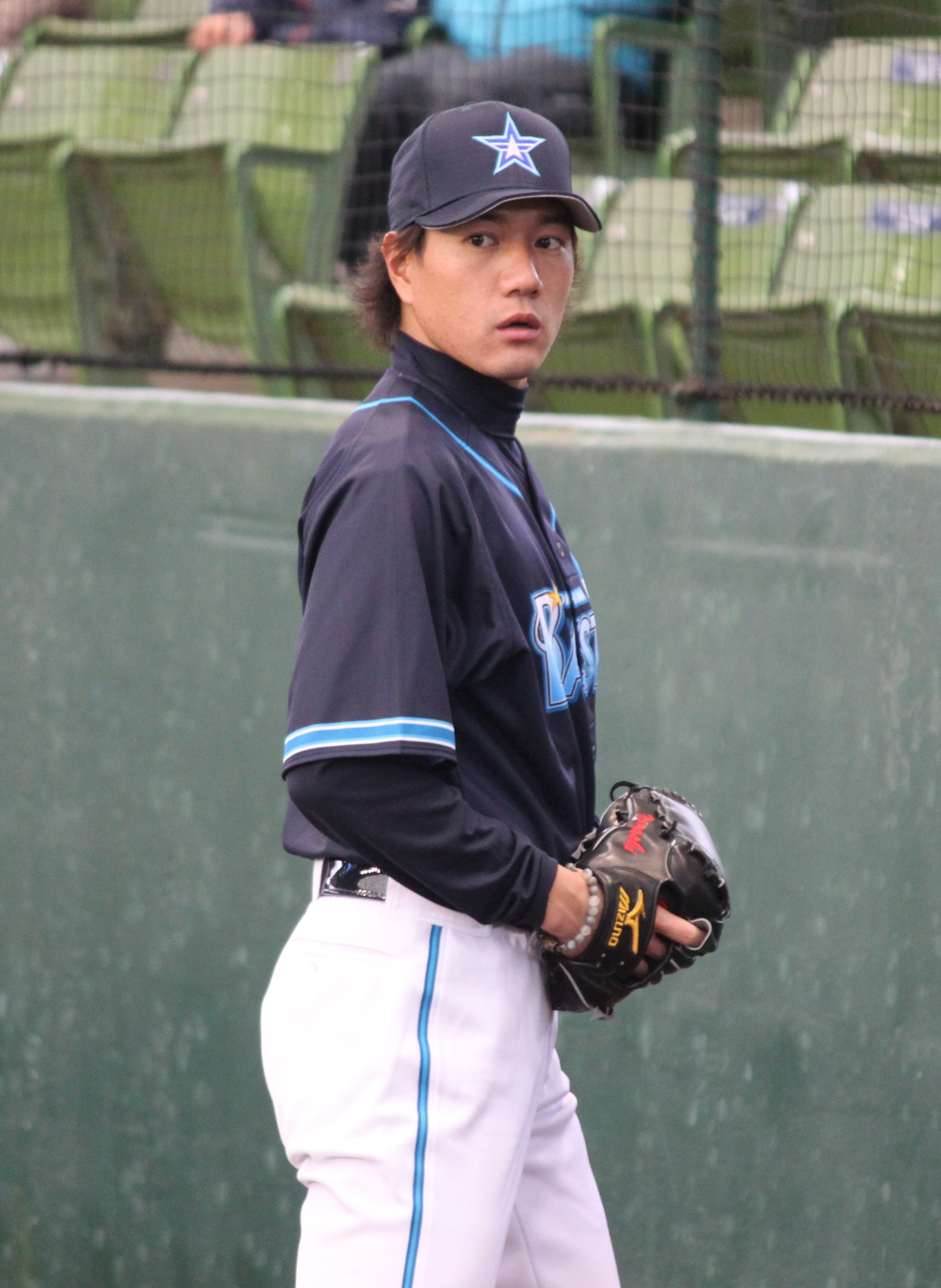
- Hayashi with the Yokohama DeNA BayStars
- Pitcher
- Born: September 19, 1983 (age 42); Funabashi, Chiba, Japan
- Batted: Left Threw: Left

NPB debut
- June 28, 2003, for the Yomiuri Giants

Last NPB appearance
- July 21, 2015, for the Yokohama DeNA BayStars

Career statistics
- Win–loss record: 22–26
- Earned run average: 3.49
- Strikeouts: 502
- Stats at Baseball Reference

Teams
- Yomiuri Giants (2002–2008); Hokkaido Nippon-Ham Fighters (2009–2011); Yokohama DeNA BayStars (2012–2015)

Masanori Hayashi (林 昌範, Hayashi Masanori; born September 19, 1983) is a former professional Japanese baseball player. He played as a pitcher in Nippon Professional Baseball (NPB) for the Yomiuri Giants (2002–2008), the Hokkaido Nippon-Ham Fighters (2009–2011) and the Yokohama DeNA BayStars (2012–2017).
