= Shinji Takahashi (baseball) =

Japanese baseball player and coach

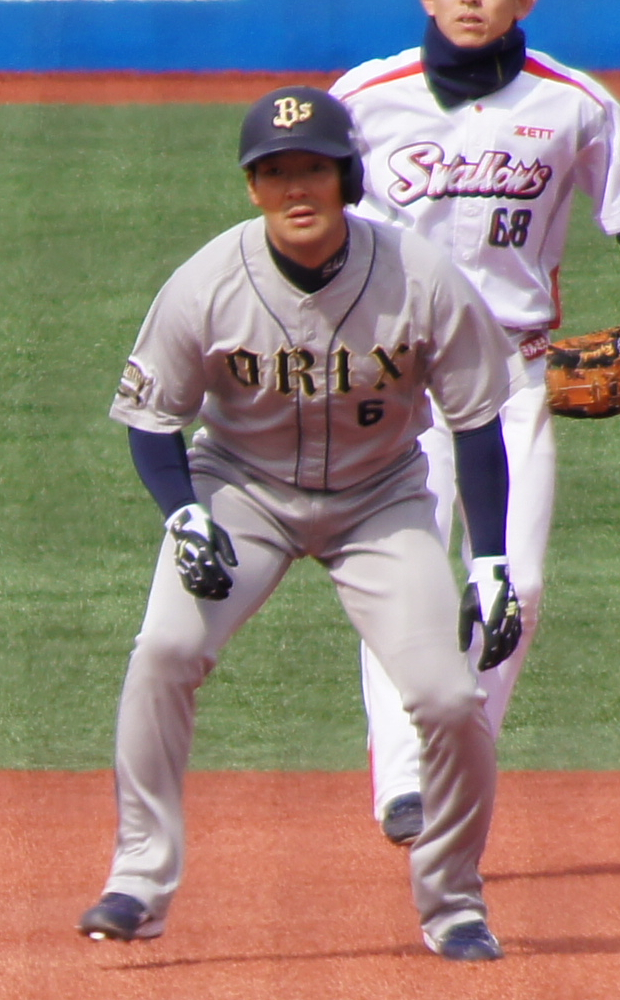

Orix Buffaloes – No. 85
- Catcher, First baseman, Coach
- Born: August 7, 1978 (age 47); Tsuyama, Okayama Japan
- Batted: Right Threw: Right

NPB debut
- October 8, 2000, for the Nippon-Ham Fighters

Last NPB appearance
- May 4, 2014, for the Orix Buffaloes

NPB statistics (through 2014 season)
- Batting average: .266
- Home runs: 82
- RBI: 416
- Stats at Baseball Reference

Teams
- As player: Nippon Ham Fighters/Hokkaido Nippon Ham Fighters (1997–2011); Yomiuri Giants (2011); Orix Buffaloes (2012–2014); As coaach: Hokkaido Nippon-Ham Fighters (2016–2021); Orix Buffaloes (2022–present)

Career highlights and awards
- 2009 Pacific League Best Nine Award; 2009 Pacific League Golden Glove Award; 1x Japan Series champion (2006); 3x NPB All-Star selection (2004, 2007, 2009)

Shinji Takahashi (髙橋 信二, Takahashi Shinji; born August 7, 1978 in Tsuyama, Okayama, Japan) is a Nippon Professional Baseball catcher for the Orix Buffaloes in Japan's Pacific League.
