= 2008 Saitama Seibu Lions season =

2008 Saitama Seibu Lions
- Pacific League champions
- League: Pacific League
- Ballpark: Seibu Dome
- Record: 76–64–4 (.543)
- League place: 1st
- Parent company: Seibu Holdings
- Manager: Hisanobu Watanabe

The 2008 Saitama Seibu Lions season was the 59th season of the Saitama Seibu Lions franchise. The Lions played their home games at Seibu Dome in the city of Tokorozawa, Saitama as members of Nippon Professional Baseball's Pacific League. The team was led by Hisanobu Watanabe on his first season as team manager.

Seibu finished the season in first place with a record of 76–64–4, winning the team its 21st PL pennant and qualifying them for the Climax Series. In the 2008 Pacific League Climax Series, the Lions defeated the Hokkaido Nippon-Ham Fighters in the Second Stage and went on to win the 2008 Japan Series, its thirteenth, as well as the 2008 Asia Series.

== Regular season ==
=== Standings ===
Pacific League regular season standings
| Pos | Team | Pld | W | L | T | GB | PCT | Home | Away |
|---|---|---|---|---|---|---|---|---|---|
| **1** | Saitama Seibu Lions | **144** | **76** | **64** | **4** | — | .542 | **44–27–1** | **32–37–3** |
| 2 | Orix Buffaloes | 144 | 75 | 68 | 1 | 5.5 | .524 | 41–31–0 | 34–37–1 |
| 3 | Hokkaido Nippon-Ham Fighters | 144 | 73 | 69 | 2 | 6 | .514 | 41–30–1 | 32–39–1 |
| 4 | Chiba Lotte Marines | 144 | 73 | 70 | 1 | 7.5 | .510 | 41–30–1 | 32–40–0 |
| 5 | Tohoku Rakuten Golden Eagles | 144 | 65 | 76 | 3 | 12.5 | .462 | 37–34–1 | 28–42–2 |
| 6 | Fukuoka SoftBank Hawks | 144 | 64 | 77 | 3 | 13.5 | .455 | 36–33–3 | 28–44–0 |

=== Interleague ===
| Team | Pld | HW | HL | AW | AL | GB | PCT |
|---|---|---|---|---|---|---|---|
| Fukuoka SoftBank Hawks | 24 | 10 | 2 | 5 | 7 | — | .625 |
| Hanshin Tigers | 24 | 10 | 2 | 5 | 7 | — | .625 |
| Hokkaido Nippon-Ham Fighters | 24 | 8 | 4 | 6 | 6 | 1 | .583 |
| Yomiuri Giants | 24 | 9 | 3 | 5 | 7 | 1 | .583 |
| Tohoku Rakuten Golden Eagles | 24 | 6 | 6 | 7 | 5 | 2 | .542 |
| Hiroshima Toyo Carp | 24 | 6 | 6 | 7 | 5 | 2 | .542 |
| Chunichi Dragons | 24 | 8 | 4 | 4 | 8 | 3 | .500 |
| Orix Buffaloes | 24 | 6 | 6 | 5 | 7 | 4 | .458 |
| Tokyo Yakult Swallows | 24 | 4 | 8 | 7 | 5 | 4 | .458 |
| Chiba Lotte Marines | 24 | 6 | 6 | 4 | 8 | 5 | .417 |
| Saitama Seibu Lions | **24** | **7** | **5** | **3** | **9** | **5** | .417 |
| Yokohama BayStars | 24 | 5 | 7 | 1 | 11 | 9 | .250 |

Updated to match(es) played on compute. Source:
Rules for classification: Whenever multiple teams have same number of wins, the team having better standings in last year's interleague games will have advantage, thus Fukuoka SoftBank Hawks won the interleague title, despite Hanshin Tigers beating the Hawks 3 out of 4 games. A similar rule applies to other teams tied in wins.

=== Record vs. opponents ===
2008 record vs. opponents
| Team | Central League opponents | | | | | | Pacific League opponents | | | | | |
| Team | BayStars | Carp | Dragons | Giants | Swallows | Tigers | Buffaloes | Eagles | Fighters | Hawks | Lions | Marines |
|---|---|---|---|---|---|---|---|---|---|---|---|---|
| BayStars | — | 11–13 | 7–17 | 5–18–1 | 9–15 | 10–13–1 | 1–3 | 0–4 | 1–3 | 0–4 | 2–2 | 2–2 |
| Carp | 13–11 | — | 9–13–2 | 12–10–2 | 12–11–1 | 10–14 | 2–2 | 2–2 | 2–2 | 1–3 | 3–1 | 3–1 |
| Dragons | 17–7 | 13–9–2 | — | 14–10 | 9–13–2 | 6–17–1 | 1–3 | 2–2 | 1–3 | 2–2 | 3–1 | 3–1 |
| Giants | 18–5–1 | 10–12–2 | 10–14 | — | 18–6 | 14–10 | 3–1 | 2–2 | 3–1 | 1–3 | 1–3 | 4–0 |
| Swallows | 15–9 | 11–12–1 | 13–9–2 | 6–18 | — | 10–13–1 | 3–1 | 2–2 | 1–3 | 2–2 | 2–2 | 1–3 |
| Tigers | 13–10–1 | 14–10 | 17–6–1 | 10–14 | 13–10–1 | — | 3–1 | 3–1 | 2–2 | 3–1 | 3–1 | 1–3 |
| Buffaloes | 3–1 | 2–2 | 3–1 | 1–3 | 1–3 | 1–3 | — | 13–10–1 | 13–11 | 14–10 | 10–14 | 14–10 |
| Eagles | 4–0 | 2–2 | 2–2 | 2–2 | 2–2 | 1–3 | 10–13–1 | — | 13–10–1 | 12–12 | 10–14 | 7–16–1 |
| Fighters | 3–1 | 2–2 | 3–1 | 1–3 | 3–1 | 2–2 | 11–13 | 10–13–1 | — | 17–7 | 9–14–1 | 12–12 |
| Hawks | 4–0 | 3–1 | 2–2 | 3–1 | 2–2 | 1–3 | 10–14 | 12–12 | 7–17 | — | 10–11–3 | 10–14 |
| Lions | 2–2 | 1–3 | 1–3 | 3–1 | 2–2 | 1–3 | 14–10 | 14–10 | 14–9–1 | 11–10–3 | — | 13–11 |
| Marines | 2–2 | 1–3 | 1–3 | 0–4 | 3–1 | 3–1 | 10–14 | 16–7–1 | 12–12 | 14–10 | 11–13 | — |

=== Opening Day roster ===
Thursday, March 20, 2008 vs. Orix Buffaloes

| Order | Player | Pos. |
|---|---|---|
| 1 | Yasuyuki Kataoka | 2B |
| 2 | Takumi Kuriyama | DH |
| 3 | Hiroyuki Nakajima | SS |
| 4 | Craig Brazell | 1B |
| 5 | G. G. Sato | RF |
| 6 | Takeya Nakamura | 3B |
| 7 | Hiram Bocachica | CF |
| 8 | Toru Hosokawa | C |
| 9 | Kenta Matsusaka | LF |
| — | Hideaki Wakui | P |

=== Game log ===
2008 game log: 76–64–4 (Home: 44–27–1; Away: 32–37–3)
March: 4–5–0 (Home: 3–3–0; Away: 1–2–0)

| # | Date | Opponent | Score | Win | Loss | Save | Stadium | Attendance | Record | Streak |
|---|---|---|---|---|---|---|---|---|---|---|
| 1 | March 20 | Buffaloes | 1–2 | Kaneko (1–0) | **Wakui** (0–1) | Kato (1) | Seibu Dome | 27,137 | 0–1–0 | L1 |
| 2 | March 22 | Buffaloes | 6–0 | **Ishii** (1–0) | Nakayama (0–1) | — | Seibu Dome | 12,288 | 1–1–0 | W1 |
| 3 | March 23 | Buffaloes | 1–2 | Kondo (1–0) | **Kinney** (0–1) | Kato (2) | Seibu Dome | 12,632 | 1–2–0 | L1 |
| 4 | March 25 | @ Fighters | 1–9 | Takeda (1–0) | **Nishiguchi** (0–1) | — | Sapporo Dome | 16,410 | 1–3–0 | L2 |
| 5 | March 26 | @ Fighters | 8–0 | **Kishi** (1–0) | Yoshikawa (0–1) | — | Sapporo Dome | 19,206 | 2–3–0 | W1 |
| 6 | March 27 | @ Fighters | 0–1 (10) | Takeda (1–0) | **Wakui** (0–2) | — | Sapporo Dome | 25,011 | 2–4–0 | L1 |
| 7 | March 28 | Hawks | 2–3 | Sugiuchi (1–0) | **Onodera** (0–1) | Nitkowski (1) | Seibu Dome | 9,184 | 2–5–0 | L2 |
| 8 | March 29 | Hawks | 10–4 | **Ishii** (2–0) | Standridge (0–1) | — | Seibu Dome | 16,044 | 3–5–0 | W1 |
| 9 | March 30 | Hawks | 5–1 | **Kinney** (1–1) | Oba (1–1) | — | Seibu Dome | 18,059 | 4–5–0 | W2 |

April: 14–7–1 (Home: 10–2–1; Away: 4–5–0)

| # | Date | Opponent | Score | Win | Loss | Save | Stadium | Attendance | Record | Streak |
|---|---|---|---|---|---|---|---|---|---|---|
| 10 | April 1 | @ Buffaloes | 6–10 | Yamamoto (1–0) | **Nishiguchi** (0–2) | — | Skymark Stadium | 10,751 | 4–6–0 | L1 |
| 11 | April 2 | @ Buffaloes | 5–1 | **Kishi** (2–0) | Takagi (1–1) | — | Kyocera Dome | 8,616 | 5–6–0 | W1 |
| 12 | April 3 | @ Buffaloes | 4–3 | **Hoshino** (1–0) | Motoyanagi (0–1) | **Graman** (1) | Kyocera Dome | 9,163 | 6–6–0 | W2 |
| 13 | April 4 | Eagles | 4–2 | **Hoashi** (1–0) | Lin (0–1) | **Graman** (2) | Shikishima Stadium | 17,599 | 7–6–0 | W3 |
| 14 | April 5 | Eagles | 4–2 | **Ishii** (3–0) | Tanaka (1–1) | **Onuma** (1) | Seibu Dome | 23,902 | 8-6-0 | W4 |
| 15 | April 6 | Eagles | 4–3 | **Kinney** (2–1) | Asai (1–2) | **Graman** (3) | Seibu Dome | 18,213 | 9–6–0 | W5 |
| 16 | April 8 | Marines | 4–3 | **Onodera** (1–1) | Ogino (1–1) | — | Seibu Dome | 8,818 | 10–6–0 | W6 |
| 17 | April 9 | Marines | 1–10 | Shimizu (1–2) | **Kishi** (2–1) | — | Seibu Dome | 10,541 | 10–7–0 | L1 |
| 18 | April 10 | Marines | 15–5 | **Wakui** (1–2) | Kubo (1–2) | — | Seibu Dome | 7,702 | 11–7–0 | W1 |
| 19 | April 11 | @ Hawks | 8–3 | **Onuma** (1–0) | Sugiuchi (1–1) | **Graman** (4) | Yahoo Dome | 28,721 | 12–7–0 | W2 |
| 20 | April 12 | @ Hawks | 5–8 | Ogura (1–0) | **Onodera** (1–2) | Houlton (1) | Yahoo Dome | 29,692 | 12–8–0 | L1 |
| 21 | April 13 | @ Hawks | 4–5 | Kume (3–0) | **Onuma** (1–1) | — | Yahoo Dome | 29,545 | 12–9–0 | L2 |
| 22 | April 15 | Fighters | 3–3 (12) | Game tied after 12 innings | | | Seibu Dome | 8,397 | 12–9–1 | T1 |
| 23 | April 16 | Fighters | 4–2 | **Wakui** (2–2) | Yoshikawa (1–3) | **Graman** (5) | Seibu Dome | 11,263 | 13–9–1 | W1 |
| — | April 19 | @ Eagles | Postponed (rain) – Makeup date: October 4 | | | | Kleenex Stadium | — | — | — |
| 24 | April 20 | @ Eagles | 4–3 (10) | **Iwasaki** (1–0) | Aoyama (1–1) | **Graman** (6) | Kleenex Stadium | 19,601 | 14–9–1 | W2 |
| 25 | April 22 | @ Marines | 1–8 | Watanabe (3–1) | **Ishii** (3–1) | — | Chiba Marine Stadium | 16,856 | 14–10–1 | L1 |
| 26 | April 23 | @ Marines | 1–2 | Ono (2–0) | **Wakui** (2–3) | Ogino (5) | Chiba Marine Stadium | 16,059 | 14–11–1 | L2 |
| — | April 24 | @ Marines | Postponed (rain) – Makeup date: October 1 | | | | Chiba Marine Stadium | — | — | — |
| 27 | April 25 | Buffaloes | 9–5 (11) | **Graman** (1–0) | Junge (0–1) | — | Seibu Dome | 7,417 | 15–11–1 | W1 |
| 28 | April 26 | Buffaloes | 10–8 | **Mitsui** (1–0) | Yoshino (0–1) | **Graman** (7) | Seibu Dome | 20,130 | 16–11–1 | W2 |
| 29 | April 27 | Buffaloes | 10–3 | **Hoashi** (2–0) | Kondo (2–3) | — | Seibu Dome | 16,472 | 17–11–1 | W3 |
| 30 | April 29 | Hawks | 7–10 (12) | Houlton (1–0) | **Mitsui** (1–1) | — | Seibu Dome | 26,619 | 17–12–1 | L1 |
| 31 | April 30 | Hawks | 6–2 | **Ishii** (4–1) | Otonari (2–4) | — | Seibu Dome | 12,497 | 18–12–1 | W1 |

May: 15–9–0 (Home: 7–2–0; Away: 8–7–0)

| # | Date | Opponent | Score | Win | Loss | Save | Stadium | Attendance | Record | Streak |
|---|---|---|---|---|---|---|---|---|---|---|
| 32 | May 1 | Hawks | 5–4 | **Wakui** (3–3) | Houlton (1–1) | — | Seibu Dome | 14,659 | 19–12–1 | W2 |
| 33 | May 2 | @ Marines | 5–0 | **Kishi** (3–1) | Shimizu (3–3) | — | Chiba Marine Stadium | 9,659 | 20–12–1 | W3 |
| 34 | May 3 | @ Marines | 1–10 | Karakawa (2–0) | **Nishiguchi** (0–3) | — | Chiba Marine Stadium | 30,014 | 20–13–1 | L1 |
| 35 | May 4 | @ Marines | 4–0 | **Hoashi** (3–0) | Kobayashi (1–5) | — | Chiba Marine Stadium | 30,023 | 21–13–1 | W1 |
| 36 | May 5 | Fighters | 8–6 | **Onodera** (2–2) | Takeda (2–2) | **Graman** (8) | Seibu Dome | 34,783 | 22–13–1 | W2 |
| 37 | May 6 | Fighters | 3–1 | **Ishii** (5–1) | Miyanishi (0–2) | — | Seibu Dome | 27,340 | 23–13–1 | W3 |
| 38 | May 7 | Fighters | 4–3 | **Hoshino** (2–0) | Darvish (5–1) | — | Seibu Dome | 15,574 | 24–13–1 | W4 |
| 39 | May 9 | @ Buffaloes | 3–2 | **Kishi** (4–1) | Ortiz (0–2) | **Graman** (9) | Kyocera Dome | 14,670 | 25–13–1 | W5 |
| — | May 10 | @ Buffaloes | Postponed (rain) – Makeup date: September 5 | | | | Skymark Stadium | — | — | — |
| 40 | May 11 | @ Buffaloes | 9–0 | **Hoashi** (4–0) | Kaneko (2–4) | — | Skymark Stadium | 12,678 | 26–13–1 | W6 |
| 41 | May 13 | @ Hawks | 2–4 | Wada (4–0) | **Ishii** (5–2) | Houlton (5) | Sun Marine Stadium | 20,606 | 26–14–1 | L1 |
| 42 | May 14 | @ Hawks | 11–4 | **Wakui** (4–3) | Guttormson (1–2) | — | Yahoo Dome | 33,629 | 27–14–1 | W1 |
| 43 | May 15 | @ Hawks | 10–3 | **Nishiguchi** (1–3) | Powell (1–2) | — | Yahoo Dome | 31,793 | 28–14–1 | W2 |
| 44 | May 16 | @ Eagles | 2–8 | Iwakuma (6–2) | **Kishi** (4–2) | — | Kleenex Stadium | 12,057 | 28–15–1 | L1 |
| 45 | May 17 | @ Eagles | 2–3 (12) | Kawagishi (1–1) | **Okamoto** (0–1) | — | Kleenex Stadium | 14,265 | 28–16–1 | L2 |
| 46 | May 18 | @ Eagles | 7–3 | **Hsu** (1–0) | Tanaka (4–3) | — | Kleenex Stadium | 20,253 | 29–16–1 | W1 |
| 47 | May 21 | Swallows | 4–5 | Rios (2–5) | **Onodera** (2–3) | Lim (13) | Seibu Dome | 15,683 | 29–17–1 | L1 |
| 48 | May 22 | Swallows | 7–2 | **Wakui** (5–3) | Muranaka (3–5) | — | Seibu Dome | 14,236 | 30–17–1 | W1 |
| 49 | May 23 | Giants | 10–1 | **Kishi** (5–2) | Greisinger (5–2) | — | Seibu Dome | 24,137 | 31–17–1 | W2 |
| 50 | May 24 | Giants | 4–2 | **Hoashi** (5–0) | Nomaguchi (1–2) | **Graman** (10) | Seibu Dome | 34,432 | 32–17–1 | W3 |
| 51 | May 25 | @ Tigers | 1–5 | Kubota (2–1) | **Onodera** (2–4) | — | Koshien Stadium | 43,516 | 32–18–1 | L1 |
| 52 | May 26 | @ Tigers | 1–2 (11) | Watanabe (2–0) | **Graman** (1–1) | — | Koshien Stadium | 41,970 | 32–19–1 | L2 |
| 53 | May 28 | @ Carp | 5–3 | **Ishii** (6–2) | Oshima (0–2) | **Graman** (11) | Fukuyama Stadium | 7,041 | 33–19–1 | W1 |
| 54 | May 29 | @ Carp | 1–3 | Lewis (7–4) | **Wakui** (5–4) | Nagakawa (6) | Hiroshima Stadium | 15,267 | 33–20–1 | L1 |
| 55 | May 31 | Dragons | 3–4 | Kawakami (3–3) | **Onuma** (1–2) | Iwase (16) | Seibu Dome | 32,788 | 33–21–1 | L2 |

June: 8–10–0 (Home: 6–4–0; Away: 2–6–0)

| # | Date | Opponent | Score | Win | Loss | Save | Stadium | Attendance | Record | Streak |
|---|---|---|---|---|---|---|---|---|---|---|
| 56 | June 1 | Dragons | 10–3 | **Hoashi** (6–0) | Nakata (4–4) | — | Seibu Dome | 33,157 | 34–21–1 | W1 |
| 57 | June 3 | BayStars | 7–3 | **Nishiguchi** (2–3) | Oyamada (1–3) | — | Seibu Dome | 11,477 | 35–21–1 | W2 |
| 58 | June 4 | BayStars | 2–1 | **Ishii** (7–2) | Kuwahara (0–1) | **Graman** (12) | Seibu Dome | 13,416 | 36–21–1 | W3 |
| 59 | June 6 | @ Swallows | 1–7 | Tateyama (5–1) | **Wakui** (5–5) | — | Iwaki Green Stadium | 7,733 | 36–22–1 | L1 |
| 60 | June 7 | @ Swallows | 5–3 | **Kishi** (6–2) | Kawashima (1–2) | **Graman** (13) | Hitachinaka Stadium | 11,232 | 37–22–1 | W1 |
| 61 | June 8 | @ Giants | 0–4 | Utsumi (4–4) | **Hsu** (1–1) | — | Tokyo Dome | 43,051 | 37–23–1 | L1 |
| 62 | June 9 | @ Giants | 9–3 | **Nishiguchi** (3–3) | Greisinger (6–4) | — | Tokyo Dome | 44,284 | 38–23–1 | W1 |
| 63 | June 11 | Tigers | 4–6 | Uezono (2–0) | **Ishii** (7–3) | Fujikawa (23) | Seibu Dome | 32,383 | 38–24–1 | L1 |
| 64 | June 12 | Tigers | 6–3 | **Wakui** (6–5) | Iwata (5–3) | — | Seibu Dome | 28,456 | 39–24–1 | W1 |
| 65 | June 14 | Carp | 1–8 | Hasegawa (3–5) | **Kishi** (6–3) | — | Seibu Dome | 30,374 | 39–25–1 | L1 |
| 66 | June 15 | Carp | 2–4 | Lewis (10–4) | **Hoashi** (6–1) | Nagakawa (11) | Seibu Dome | 28,657 | 39–26–1 | L2 |
| 67 | June 17 | @ Dragons | 4–5 | Iwase (2–2) | **Okamoto** (0–1) | — | Ishikawa Stadium | 10,944 | 39–27–1 | L3 |
| 68 | June 18 | @ Dragons | 2–3 | Ogasawara (7–4) | **Wakui** (6–6) | Iwase (21) | Alpen Stadium | 13,632 | 39–28–1 | L4 |
| 69 | June 21 | @ BayStars | 4–5 (10) | Terahara (3–5) | **Graman** (1–2) | — | Yokohama Stadium | 14,165 | 39–29–1 | L5 |
| — | June 22 | @ BayStars | Postponed (rain) – Makeup date: June 23 | | | | Yokohama Stadium | — | — | — |
| 70 | June 23 | @ BayStars | 5–10 | Wood (1–6) | **Ishii** (7–4) | — | Yokohama Stadium | 8,251 | 39–30–1 | L6 |
| 71 | June 27 | Marines | 4–1 | **Hoashi** (7–1) | Naruse (4–4) | **Graman** (14) | Omiya Stadium | 20,289 | 40–30–1 | W1 |
| 72 | June 28 | Marines | 3–11 | Watanabe (6–4) | **Kishi** (6–4) | — | Seibu Dome | 29,507 | 40–31–1 | L1 |
| 73 | June 29 | Marines | 9–5 | **Nishiguchi** (4–3) | Kobayashi (2–8) | — | Seibu Dome | 25,666 | 41–31–1 | W1 |

July: 13–10–0 (Home: 5–4–0; Away: 8–6–0)

| # | Date | Opponent | Score | Win | Loss | Save | Stadium | Attendance | Record | Streak |
|---|---|---|---|---|---|---|---|---|---|---|
| 74 | July 1 | @ Fighters | 12–7 | **Onodera** (3–4) | Miyanishi (2–3) | — | Sapporo Dome | 22,125 | 42–31–1 | W2 |
| 75 | July 2 | @ Fighters | 8–6 | **Wakui** (7–6) | Glynn (3–11) | **Graman** (15) | Sapporo Dome | 17,682 | 43–31–1 | W3 |
| 76 | July 3 | @ Fighters | 4–6 | Darvish (9–3) | **Hoashi** (7–2) | Nakamura (14) | Sapporo Dome | 24,420 | 43–32–1 | L1 |
| 77 | July 5 | Eagles | 3–2 | **Kishi** (7–4) | Tanaka (6–5) | **Graman** (16) | Seibu Dome | 29,719 | 44–32–1 | W1 |
| 78 | July 6 | Eagles | 5–7 | Aoyama (2–2) | **Hsu** (1–2) | Kawagishi (1) | Seibu Dome | 25,654 | 44–33–1 | L1 |
| 79 | July 8 | Hawks | 2–5 | Sugiuchi (7–5) | **Ishii** (7–5) | — | Seibu Dome | 13,486 | 44–34–1 | L2 |
| 80 | July 9 | Hawks | 2–7 | Guttormson (4–4) | **Wakui** (7–7) | — | Seibu Dome | 15,674 | 44–35–1 | L3 |
| 81 | July 11 | @ Buffaloes | 12–4 | **Hoashi** (8–2) | Ortiz (3–6) | — | Skymark Stadium | 15,296 | 45–35–1 | W1 |
| 82 | July 12 | @ Buffaloes | 4–2 | **Shotsu** (1–0) | Kato (1–3) | **Graman** (17) | Skymark Stadium | 13,321 | 46–35–1 | W2 |
| 83 | July 13 | @ Buffaloes | 1–4 | Kaneko (5–6) | **Nishiguchi** (4–4) | Kato (19) | Kyocera Dome | 13,312 | 46–36–1 | L1 |
| 84 | July 15 | @ Hawks | 4–13 | Sugiuchi (8–5) | **Ishii** (7–6) | — | Yahoo Dome | 35,706 | 46–37–1 | L2 |
| 85 | July 16 | @ Hawks | 5–6 (12) | Mise (2–0) | **Hoshino** (2–1) | — | Yahoo Dome | 35,674 | 46–38–1 | L3 |
| 86 | July 18 | @ Marines | 8–6 | **Hoashi** (9–2) | Karakawa (5–2) | **Graman** (18) | Chiba Marine Stadium | 17,394 | 47–38–1 | W1 |
| 87 | July 19 | @ Marines | 17–10 | **Hoshino** (3–1) | Naruse (6–5) | **Onodera** (1) | Chiba Marine Stadium | 25,823 | 48–38–1 | W2 |
| 88 | July 20 | @ Marines | 0–16 | Watanabe (8–4) | **Nishiguchi** (4–5) | — | Chiba Marine Stadium | 26,365 | 48–39–1 | L1 |
| 89 | July 21 | Eagles | 6 - 4 | **Shotsu** (2-0) | Koyama (2-5) | **Graman** (19) | Seibu Dome | 25,431 | 49–39–1 | W1 |
| 90 | July 22 | Eagles | 14–2 | **Wakui** (8–7) | Hasebe (0–2) | — | Seibu Dome | 16,103 | 50–39–1 | W2 |
| 91 | July 23 | Eagles | 14–5 | **Hirano** (1–0) | Guzmán (2–6) | — | Seibu Dome | 17,028 | 51–39–1 | W3 |
| 92 | July 25 | @ Fighters | 1–2 | Tadano (6–3) | **Hoashi** (9–3) | Nakamura (18) | Sapporo Dome | 23,323 | 51–40–1 | L1 |
| 93 | July 26 | @ Fighters | 6–3 | **Iwasaki** (2–0) | Kanamori (0–1) | **Graman** (20) | Sapporo Dome | 33,538 | 52–40–1 | W1 |
| 94 | July 27 | @ Fighters | 3–2 (10) | **Graman** (2–2) | Takeda (3–4) | — | Sapporo Dome | 36,064 | 53–40–1 | W2 |
| 95 | July 28 | Buffaloes | 2–6 | Komatsu (7–3) | **Wakui** (8–8) | — | Seibu Dome | 14,768 | 53–41–1 | L1 |
| 96 | July 29 | Buffaloes | 4–2 | **Ishii** (8–6) | Yoshino (1–3) | **Graman** (21) | Seibu Dome | 17,016 | 54–41–1 | W1 |
All-Star Break: CL and PL split series, 1–1

August: 12–7–3 (Home: 10–4–0; Away: 2–3–3)

| # | Date | Opponent | Score | Win | Loss | Save | Stadium | Attendance | Record | Streak |
|---|---|---|---|---|---|---|---|---|---|---|
| 97 | August 3 | Marines | 3–4 | Watanabe (9–4) | **Hirano** (1–1) | Ogino (16) | Nagano Olympic | 14,134 | 54–42–1 | L1 |
| 98 | August 4 | Marines | 16 –2 | **Kishi** (8–4) | Shimizu (8–7) | — | Nagano Olympic | 11,355 | 55–42–1 | W1 |
| 99 | August 10 | Fighters | 11–2 | **Hoashi** (10–3) | Tadano (6–5) | — | Seibu Dome | 30,024 | 56–42–1 | W2 |
| 100 | August 11 | Fighters | 3–0 | **Kishi** (9–4) | Takeda (6–4) | **Graman** (22) | Seibu Dome | 19,260 | 57–42–1 | W3 |
| 101 | August 12 | Fighters | 8–4 | **Onodera** (4–4) | Takeda (3–5) | — | Seibu Dome | 19,055 | 58–42–1 | W4 |
| 102 | August 13 | @ Eagles | 7–11 | Nagai (6–6) | **Ishii** (8–7) | — | Kleenex Stadium | 20,405 | 58–43–1 | L1 |
| 103 | August 14 | @ Eagles | 8–2 | **Nishiguchi** (5–5) | Aoyama (2–6) | — | Kleenex Stadium | 19,227 | 59–43–1 | W1 |
| 104 | August 15 | @ Eagles | 4–9 | Asai (8–7) | **Hirano** (1–2) | — | Kleenex Stadium | 19,981 | 59–44–1 | L1 |
| 105 | August 16 | Buffaloes | 8–7 (10) | **Graman** (3–2) | Shimizu (4–1) | — | Seibu Dome | 27,363 | 60–44–1 | W1 |
| 106 | August 17 | Buffaloes | 4–1 | **Kishi** (10–4) | Yamamoto (8–3) | — | Seibu Dome | 19,027 | 61–44–1 | W2 |
| 107 | August 18 | Buffaloes | 4–7 | Katsuki (2–0) | **Okamoto** (0–2) | Kato (26) | Seibu Dome | 12,160 | 61–45–1 | L1 |
| 108 | August 19 | Hawks | 12–3 | **Ishii** (9–7) | Houlton (4–4) | — | Seibu Dome | 16,161 | 62–45–1 | W1 |
| 109 | August 20 | Hawks | 7–1 | **Nishiguchi** (6–5) | Arakaki (0–4) | — | Seibu Dome | 17,513 | 63–45–1 | W2 |
| 110 | August 21 | Hawks | 5–9 | Powell (2–6) | **Okamoto** (0–2) | — | Seibu Dome | 18,195 | 63–46–1 | L1 |
| 111 | August 24 | @ Fighters | 3–9 | Tadano (7–5) | **Hoashi** (10–4) | — | Starffin Stadium | 22,583 | 63–47–1 | L2 |
| 112 | August 25 | @ Fighters | 4–3 | **Onodera** (5–4) | Takeda (3–7) | **Graman** (23) | Sapporo Dome | 21,840 | 64–47–1 | W1 |
| 113 | August 26 | Eagles | 2–7 | Iwakuma (17–3) | **Kinney** (2–2) | — | Seibu Dome | 13,491 | 64–48–1 | L1 |
| 114 | August 27 | Eagles | 7–2 | **Ishii** (10–7) | Asai (8–8) | **Graman** (24) | Seibu Dome | 17,760 | 65–48–1 | W1 |
| 115 | August 28 | Eagles | 5–4 | **Nishiguchi** (7–5) | Kitani (0–1) | **Graman** (25) | Seibu Dome | 16,555 | 66–48–1 | W2 |
| 116 | August 29 | @ Hawks | 4–4 (12) | Game tied after 12 innings | | | Yahoo Dome | 32,998 | 66–48–2 | T1 |
| 117 | August 30 | @ Hawks | 2–2 (12) | Game tied after 12 innings | | | Yahoo Dome | 33,051 | 66–48–3 | T2 |
| 118 | August 31 | @ Hawks | 0–0 (12) | Game tied after 12 innings | | | Yahoo Dome | 33,288 | 66–48–4 | T3 |

September: 9–15–0 (Home: 3–8–0; Away: 6–7–0)

| # | Date | Opponent | Score | Win | Loss | Save | Stadium | Attendance | Record | Streak |
|---|---|---|---|---|---|---|---|---|---|---|
| 119 | September 2 | @ Marines | 5–8 | Watanabe (12–5) | **Ishii** (10–8) | — | Chiba Marine Stadium | 14,269 | 66–49–4 | L1 |
| 120 | September 3 | @ Marines | 2–0 | **Nishiguchi** (8–5) | Kubo (2–7) | **Graman** (26) | Chiba Marine Stadium | 17,361 | 67–49–4 | W1 |
| 121 | September 4 | @ Marines | 3–4 | Kawasaki (2–4) | **Wakui** (8–9) | Ogino (22) | Chiba Marine Stadium | 16,534 | 67–50–4 | L1 |
| 122 | September 5 | @ Buffaloes | 3–8 | Kishida (3–0) | **Hoashi** (10–5) | — | Skymark Stadium | 11,284 | 67–51–4 | L2 |
| 123 | September 6 | @ Buffaloes | 7–1 | **Kishi** (11–4) | Yamamoto (9–5) | — | Kyocera Dome | 16,385 | 68–51–4 | W1 |
| 124 | September 7 | @ Buffaloes | 2–6 | Kaneko (10–8) | **Kinney** (2–3) | — | Kyocera Dome | 18,431 | 68–52–4 | L1 |
| 125 | September 9 | Fighters | 1–4 | Darvish (13–4) | **Ishii** (10–9) | Nakamura (24) | Seibu Dome | 14,554 | 68–53–4 | L2 |
| 126 | September 10 | Fighters | 5–6 | Sakamoto (4–1) | **Nishiguchi** (8–6) | Nakamura (25) | Seibu Dome | 14,292 | 68–54–4 | L3 |
| 127 | September 11 | Fighters | 5–3 | **Wakui** (9–9) | Sweeney (11–4) | **Graman** (27) | Seibu Dome | 14,016 | 69–54–4 | W1 |
| 128 | September 13 | @ Eagles | 12–0 | **Hoashi** (11–5) | Katayama (2–6) | — | Kleenex Stadium | 17,909 | 70–54–4 | W2 |
| 129 | September 14 | @ Eagles | 4–5 | Arime (2–2) | **Onodera** (5–5) | Gwyn (3) | Kleenex Stadium | 19,956 | 70–55–4 | L1 |
| 130 | September 15 | @ Eagles | 6–5 | **Shotsu** (3–0) | Gwyn (1–1) | **Graman** (28) | Kleenex Stadium | 17,188 | 71–55–4 | W1 |
| 131 | September 16 | Marines | 4–3 | **Ishii** (11–9) | Watanabe (12–7) | **Graman** (29) | Seibu Dome | 14,250 | 72–55–4 | W2 |
| 132 | September 17 | Marines | 5–4 (10) | **Onuma** (2–2) | Kawasaki (2–5) | — | Seibu Dome | 14,493 | 73–55–4 | W3 |
| 133 | September 18 | Marines | 3–6 | Shimizu (12–9) | **Wakui** (9–10) | Ogino (26) | Seibu Dome | 14,075 | 73–56–4 | L1 |
| 134 | September 20 | @ Hawks | 1–0 (10) | **Hoshino** (4–1) | Wada (8–6) | **Graman** (30) | Yahoo Dome | 29,788 | 74–56–4 | W1 |
| 135 | September 21 | @ Hawks | 10–5 | **Kishi** (12–4) | Guttormson (4–7) | **Graman** (31) | Yahoo Dome | 32,108 | 75–56–4 | W2 |
| 136 | September 22 | Eagles | 1–6 | Iwakuma (20–3) | **Ishii** (11–10) | — | Seibu Dome | 26,361 | 75–57–4 | L1 |
| 137 | September 23 | Eagles | 7–10 | Kawagishi (3–3) | **Graman** (3–3) | — | Seibu Dome | 33,229 | 75–58–4 | L2 |
| 138 | September 24 | Marines | 1–9 | Kubo (3–7) | **Wakui** (9–11) | — | Seibu Dome | 28,613 | 75–59–4 | L3 |
| 139 | September 26 | @ Fighters | 0–2 | Sweeney (12–5) | **Hoashi** (11–6) | Tateyama (2) | Sapporo Dome | 28,331 | 75–60–4 | L4 |
| 140 | September 27 | @ Fighters | 4–5 | Glynn (7–14) | **Hsu** (1–3) | Nakamura (28) | Sapporo Dome | 35,460 | 75–61–4 | L5 |
| 141 | September 28 | Buffaloes | 2–7 | Komatsu (5–3) | **Kinney** (2–4) | — | Seibu Dome | 33,229 | 75–62–4 | L6 |
| 142 | September 29 | Buffaloes | 3–4 (10) | Katsuki (4–0) | **Onuma** (2–3) | — | Seibu Dome | 27,611 | 75–63–4 | L7 |

October: 1–1–0 (Home: 0–0–0; Away: 1–1–0)

| # | Date | Opponent | Score | Win | Loss | Save | Stadium | Attendance | Record | Streak |
|---|---|---|---|---|---|---|---|---|---|---|
| 143 | October 1 | @ Marines | 9–5 | **Wakui** (10–11) | Watanabe (13–8) | — | Chiba Marine Stadium | 24,752 | 76–63–4 | W1 |
| 144 | October 4 | @ Eagles | 3–4 (10) | Kawagishi (4–3) | **Onuma** (2–4) | — | Kleenex Stadium | 14,063 | 76–64–4 | L1 |

Legend: = Win = Loss = Tie = Postponement
Bold = Lions team member

== Postseason ==
=== Game log ===
2008 postseason game log: 4–3–0 (Home: 0–0–0; Away: 4–3–0)
Climax Series Second Stage: 3–2–0 (Home: 3–2–0; Away: 0–0–0)

| # | Date | Opponent | Score | Win | Loss | Save | Stadium | Attendance | Record | Streak |
|---|---|---|---|---|---|---|---|---|---|---|
| 1 | October 17 | Fighters | 10–3 | **Wakui** (1–0) | Glynn (0–1) | — | Omiya Stadium | 20,500 | 1–0–0 | W1 |
| 2 | October 18 | Fighters | 0–5 | Darvish (1–0) | **Kishi** (0–1) | — | Seibu Dome | 30,918 | 1–1–0 | L1 |
| 3 | October 19 | Fighters | 4–7 | Takeda (1–0) | **Hoashi** (0–1) | — | Seibu Dome | 33,078 | 1–2–0 | L2 |
| 4 | October 21 | Fighters | 9–4 | **Ishii** (1–0) | Sweeney (0–1) | — | Seibu Dome | 18,704 | 2–2–0 | W1 |
| 5 | October 22 | Fighters | 9–4 | **Wakui** (2–0) | Glynn (0–2) | — | Seibu Dome | 21,731 | 3–2–0 | W2 |

Japan Series: 4–3–0 (Home: 1–2–0; Away: 3–1–0)

| # | Date | Opponent | Score | Win | Loss | Save | Stadium | Attendance | Record | Streak |
|---|---|---|---|---|---|---|---|---|---|---|
| 1 | November 1 | @ Giants | 2–1 | **Wakui** (1–0) | Uehara (0–1) | **Graman** (1) | Tokyo Dome | 44,757 | 1–0–0 | W1 |
| 2 | November 2 | @ Giants | 2–3 | Ochi (1–0) | **Okamoto** (0–1) | — | Tokyo Dome | 44,814 | 1–1–0 | L1 |
| 3 | November 4 | Giants | 4–6 | Utsumi (1–0) | **Ishii** (0–1) | Kroon (1) | Seibu Dome | 24,495 | 1–2–0 | L2 |
| 4 | November 5 | Giants | 5–0 | **Kishi** (1–0) | Greisinger (0–1) | — | Seibu Dome | 27,930 | 2–2–0 | W1 |
| 5 | November 6 | Giants | 3–7 | Nishimura (1–0) | **Wakui** (1–1) | — | Seibu Dome | 28,763 | 2–3–0 | L1 |
| 6 | November 8 | @ Giants | 4–1 | **Kishi** (2–0) | Takahashi (0–1) | — | Tokyo Dome | 44,749 | 3–3–0 | W1 |
| 7 | November 9 | @ Giants | 3–2 | **Hoshino** (1–0) | Ochi (1–1) | **Graman** (2) | Tokyo Dome | 44,737 | 4–3–0 | W2 |

Asia Series: 3–1–0 (Home: 2–0–0; Away: 1–1–0)

| # | Date | Opponent | Score | Win | Loss | Save | Stadium | Attendance | Record | Streak |
|---|---|---|---|---|---|---|---|---|---|---|
| 1 | November 13 | @ Wyverns | 3–4 | Lee (1–0) | **Hoashi** (0–1) | — | Tokyo Dome | 9,277 | 0–1–0 | L1 |
| 2 | November 14 | Lions | 2–1 | **Kishi** (1–0) | Pan (0–1) | **Onodera** (1) | Tokyo Dome | 8,443 | 1–1–0 | W1 |
| 3 | November 15 | @ Lions | 16–2 (7) | **Onuma** (1–0) | Wei (0–2) | — | Tokyo Dome | 8,478 | 2–1–0 | W2 |
| 4 | November 16 | Lions | 1–0 | **Okamoto** (1–0) | Pan (0–2) | — | Tokyo Dome | 18,370 | 3–1–0 | W3 |

Legend: = Win = Loss = Tie = Postponement
Bold = Lions team member

== Roster ==
2008 Saitama Seibu Lions
Roster
| Pitchers: 54 Alex Graman; 19 Masamitsu Hirano; 47 Kazuyuki Hoashi; 26 Tomoki Hoshino; 23 Hsu Ming-chieh; 61 Kazuhisa Ishii; 35 Tetsuya Iwasaki; 40 Matt Kinney; 11 Takayuki Kishi; 29 Koji Mitsui; 13 Fumiya Nishiguchi; 30 Atsushi Okamoto; 12 Shinya Okamoto; 14 Chikara Onodera; 15 Koji Onuma; 34 Shuichiro Osada; 25 Eiji Shotsu; 69 Shinji Taninaka; 16 Hideaki Wakui; 36 Minoru Yamagishi; 17 Satoshi Yamazaki | Catchers: 27 Toru Hosokawa; 22 Kosuke Noda; 37 Ginjiro Sumitani; 49 Tatsuyuki Uemoto; Infielders: 42 Craig Brazell; 33 Akira Eto; 6 Taketoshi Goto; 43 Takuya Hara; 8 Hiroshi Hirao; 52 Hidekazu Hoshi; 5 Yoshihito Ishii; 7 Yasuyuki Kataoka; 56 Haruki Kurose; 45 Keisuke Mizuta; 3 Hiroyuki Nakajima; 60 Takeya Nakamura; 4 Hiroyuki Takagi | Outfielders: 9 Shogo Akada; 55 Hiram Bocachica; 1 Takumi Kuriyama; 58 Kenta Matsusaka; 53 Taka Miura; 0 Yutaro Osaki; 51 Hiroyuki Oshima; 46 G. G. Sato; 10 Tomoaki Sato; 44 Hisashi Takayama | Manager: 99 Hisanobu Watanabe; Coaches: 81 Yukinobu Kuroe (head); 80 Kazuyoshi Ono (pitching); 86 Tetsuya Shiozaki (pitching); 96 Hiromoto Okubo (hitting); 78 Toru Kumazawa (assistant hitting); 82 Takanori Okamura (defensive/base running); 85 Masakazu Seike (defensive/base running); 88 Katsuya Soma (battery); 98 Koichi Osako (training) |

== Player statistics ==
=== Batting ===
2008 Saitama Seibu Lions batting statistics
| Player | G | AB | R | H | 2B | 3B | HR | RBI | SB | BB | K | AVG | OBP | SLG | TB |
|---|---|---|---|---|---|---|---|---|---|---|---|---|---|---|---|
| Shogo Akada | 68 | 160 | 29 | 39 | 7 | 1 | 2 | 13 | 2 | 14 | 37 | .244 | .305 | .338 | 54 |
| Hiram Bocachica | 78 | 239 | 43 | 60 | 13 | 0 | 20 | 47 | 3 | 24 | 76 | .251 | .344 | .556 | 133 |
| Craig Brazell | 130 | 471 | 59 | 110 | 19 | 0 | 27 | 87 | 0 | 30 | 139 | .234 | .294 | .446 | 210 |
| Akira Eto | 42 | 97 | 9 | 20 | 1 | 0 | 7 | 17 | 0 | 13 | 21 | .206 | .297 | .433 | 42 |
| Taketoshi Goto | 49 | 166 | 34 | 50 | 14 | 0 | 12 | 27 | 0 | 16 | 31 | .301 | .370 | .602 | 100 |
| Takuya Hara | 3 | 6 | 1 | 3 | 1 | 0 | 0 | 0 | 0 | 1 | 2 | .500 | .571 | .667 | 4 |
| Hiroshi Hirao | 55 | 93 | 15 | 24 | 4 | 0 | 2 | 9 | 1 | 3 | 23 | .258 | .293 | .366 | 34 |
| Kazuyuki Hoashi | 27 | 5 | 0 | 0 | 0 | 0 | 0 | 0 | 0 | 0 | 5 | .000 | .000 | .000 | 0 |
| Hidekazu Hoshi | 3 | 7 | 0 | 0 | 0 | 0 | 0 | 0 | 0 | 0 | 3 | .000 | .000 | .000 | 0 |
| Toru Hosokawa | 133 | 404 | 42 | 96 | 20 | 1 | 16 | 58 | 0 | 12 | 129 | .238 | .263 | .411 | 166 |
| Hsu Ming-chieh | 17 | 1 | 0 | 0 | 0 | 0 | 0 | 0 | 0 | 0 | 1 | .000 | .000 | .000 | 0 |
| Kazuhisa Ishii | 25 | 2 | 0 | 0 | 0 | 0 | 0 | 0 | 0 | 0 | 1 | .000 | .000 | .000 | 0 |
| Yoshihito Ishii | 108 | 306 | 31 | 85 | 21 | 1 | 4 | 29 | 0 | 25 | 53 | .278 | .328 | .392 | 120 |
| Yasuyuki Kataoka | 139 | 582 | 85 | 167 | 25 | 6 | 4 | 46 | 50 | 24 | 57 | .287 | .322 | .371 | 216 |
| Takayuki Kishi | 26 | 3 | 0 | 0 | 0 | 0 | 0 | 0 | 0 | 0 | 2 | .000 | .000 | .000 | 0 |
| Takumi Kuriyama | 138 | 527 | 76 | 167 | 31 | 3 | 11 | 72 | 17 | 49 | 61 | .317 | .376 | .450 | 237 |
| Haruki Kurose | 18 | 38 | 7 | 8 | 2 | 0 | 1 | 5 | 0 | 4 | 5 | .211 | .302 | .342 | 13 |
| Kenta Matsusaka | 55 | 91 | 11 | 24 | 6 | 3 | 1 | 12 | 2 | 2 | 29 | .264 | .316 | .429 | 39 |
| Taka Miura | 8 | 7 | 1 | 2 | 0 | 0 | 0 | 1 | 0 | 1 | 2 | .286 | .375 | .286 | 2 |
| Keisuke Mizuta | 17 | 0 | 2 | 0 | 0 | 0 | 0 | 0 | 0 | 1 | 0 | — | 1.00 | — | 0 |
| Hiroyuki Nakajima | 124 | 486 | 75 | 161 | 32 | 0 | 21 | 81 | 25 | 55 | 96 | .331 | .410 | .527 | 256 |
| Takeya Nakamura | 143 | 524 | 90 | 128 | 24 | 4 | 46 | 101 | 2 | 53 | 162 | .244 | .320 | .569 | 298 |
| Fumiya Nishiguchi | 22 | 4 | 1 | 1 | 0 | 0 | 0 | 0 | 0 | 1 | 2 | .250 | .400 | .250 | 1 |
| Kosuke Noda | 9 | 9 | 1 | 1 | 0 | 0 | 0 | 0 | 0 | 0 | 4 | .111 | .111 | .111 | 1 |
| Koji Onuma | 52 | 1 | 0 | 0 | 0 | 0 | 0 | 0 | 0 | 0 | 1 | .000 | .000 | .000 | 0 |
| Yutaro Osaki | 5 | 9 | 0 | 1 | 1 | 0 | 0 | 0 | 0 | 0 | 4 | .111 | .111 | .222 | 2 |
| Hiroyuki Oshima | 38 | 74 | 6 | 18 | 4 | 0 | 2 | 7 | 0 | 10 | 14 | .243 | .333 | .378 | 28 |
| G. G. Sato | 105 | 388 | 62 | 117 | 30 | 1 | 21 | 62 | 1 | 31 | 62 | .302 | .368 | .546 | 212 |
| Tomoaki Sato | 59 | 126 | 23 | 38 | 8 | 1 | 1 | 11 | 4 | 6 | 23 | .302 | .341 | .405 | 51 |
| Ginjiro Sumitani | 46 | 64 | 5 | 8 | 4 | 0 | 0 | 5 | 0 | 2 | 30 | .125 | .149 | .188 | 12 |
| Hiroyuki Takagi | 1 | 1 | 0 | 0 | 0 | 0 | 0 | 0 | 0 | 0 | 0 | .000 | .000 | .000 | 0 |
| Hisashi Takayama | 25 | 42 | 6 | 10 | 2 | 0 | 0 | 3 | 0 | 1 | 10 | .238 | .256 | .286 | 12 |
| Tatsuyuki Uemoto | 17 | 14 | 1 | 1 | 1 | 0 | 0 | 0 | 0 | 0 | 4 | .071 | .071 | .143 | 2 |
| Hideaki Wakui | 25 | 5 | 0 | 0 | 0 | 0 | 0 | 0 | 0 | 0 | 4 | .000 | .000 | .000 | 0 |
| Total：34 players | 1,810 | 4,952 | 715 | 1,339 | 270 | 21 | 198 | 693 | 107 | 378 | 1,093 | .270 | .330 | .453 | 2,245 |

^{†}Denotes player joined the team mid-season. Stats reflect time with the Lions only.
^{‡}Denotes player left the team mid-season. Stats reflect time with the Lions only.
Bold/italics denotes best in the league

=== Pitching ===
2008 Saitama Seibu Lions pitching statistics
| Player | W | L | ERA | G | GS | SV | IP | H | R | ER | BB | K |
|---|---|---|---|---|---|---|---|---|---|---|---|---|
| Alex Graman | 3 | 3 | 1.42 | 55 | 0 | 31 | 57 | 47 | 12 | 9 | 13 | 42 |
| Masamitsu Hirano | 1 | 2 | 8.28 | 11 | 3 | 0 | 25 | 41 | 29 | 23 | 11 | 21 |
| Kazuyuki Hoashi | 11 | 6 | 2.63 | 27 | 26 | 0 | 174.2 | 169 | 59 | 51 | 38 | 115 |
| Tomoki Hoshino | 4 | 1 | 2.38 | 63 | 0 | 0 | 34 | 22 | 9 | 9 | 15 | 23 |
| Hsu Ming-chieh | 1 | 3 | 5.12 | 17 | 2 | 0 | 31.2 | 37 | 21 | 18 | 22 | 11 |
| Kazuhisa Ishii | 11 | 10 | 4.32 | 25 | 25 | 0 | 135.1 | 150 | 78 | 65 | 40 | 108 |
| Tetsuya Iwasaki | 2 | 0 | 5.57 | 20 | 0 | 0 | 21 | 32 | 16 | 13 | 4 | 10 |
| Matt Kinney | 2 | 4 | 4.48 | 17 | 15 | 0 | 80.1 | 87 | 47 | 40 | 35 | 64 |
| Takayuki Kishi | 12 | 4 | 3.42 | 26 | 26 | 0 | 168.1 | 151 | 65 | 64 | 48 | 138 |
| Koji Mitsui | 1 | 1 | 7.50 | 23 | 0 | 0 | 24 | 33 | 20 | 20 | 10 | 12 |
| Fumiya Nishiguchi | 8 | 6 | 5.03 | 22 | 21 | 0 | 116.1 | 125 | 69 | 65 | 48 | 92 |
| Atsushi Okamoto | 0 | 2 | 5.51 | 14 | 1 | 0 | 16.1 | 30 | 16 | 10 | 10 | 9 |
| Shinya Okamoto | 0 | 2 | 3.83 | 47 | 0 | 0 | 42.1 | 38 | 18 | 18 | 21 | 42 |
| Chikara Onodera | 5 | 5 | 3.56 | 50 | 0 | 1 | 55.2 | 54 | 26 | 22 | 22 | 38 |
| Koji Onuma | 2 | 4 | 3.69 | 52 | 0 | 1 | 83 | 79 | 34 | 34 | 36 | 64 |
| Shuichiro Osada | 0 | 0 | 0.00 | 1 | 0 | 0 | 1.1 | 1 | 0 | 0 | 0 | 1 |
| Eiji Shotsu | 3 | 0 | 2.35 | 32 | 0 | 0 | 30.2 | 26 | 11 | 8 | 13 | 16 |
| Shinji Taninaka | 0 | 0 | 2.77 | 11 | 0 | 0 | 13 | 14 | 4 | 4 | 3 | 11 |
| Hideaki Wakui | 10 | 11 | 3.90 | 25 | 25 | 0 | 173 | 173 | 80 | 75 | 51 | 122 |
| Minoru Yamagishi | 0 | 0 | 5.40 | 4 | 0 | 0 | 8.1 | 9 | 8 | 5 | 2 | 2 |
| Satoshi Yamazaki | 0 | 0 | 6.35 | 3 | 0 | 0 | 5.2 | 6 | 4 | 4 | 7 | 3 |
| Total：21 players | 76 | 64 | 3.86 | 545 | 144 | 33 | 1,297 | 1,324 | 626 | 556 | 449 | 944 |

^{†}Denotes player joined the team mid-season. Stats reflect time with the Lions only.
^{‡}Denotes player left the team mid-season. Stats reflect time with the Lions only.
Bold/italics denotes best in the league

== Awards and honors ==
Nippon Life Monthly MVP Award

- Takayuki Kishi - August (pitcher)
- G. G. Sato - May (batter)
- Craig Brazell - June (batter)

Best Nine Award

- Toru Hosokawa - catcher
- Yasuyuki Kataoka - second baseman
- Takeya Nakamura - third baseman
- Hiroyuki Nakajima - shortstop
- Takumi Kuriyama - outfielder

Climax Series Second Stage MVP

- Hideaki Wakui

Japan Series MVP

- Takayuki Kishi

Matsutaro Shoriki Award

- Hisanobu Watanabe

Mitsui Golden Glove Award

- Toru Hosokawa - catcher
- Hiroyuki Nakajima - shortstop

All-Star Series selections

- Kazuyuki Hoashi - pitcher
- Toru Hosokawa - catcher
- Yasuyuki Kataoka - second baseman
- Takeya Nakamura - third baseman
- Hiroyuki Nakajima - infielder
- G. G. Sato - outfielder

JA Zen-Noh Go-Go Awards

Most Doubles and Triples Award (August)
- Takumi Kuriyama
Strong Shoulder Award (September)
- G. G. Sato

== Farm team ==
Eastern League regular season standings
| Team | G | W | L | T | Win% | GB | Home | Away |
|---|---|---|---|---|---|---|---|---|
| Tokyo Yakult Swallows | 96 | 55 | 34 | 7 | .618 | — | 35–10–3 | 20–24–4 |
| Yomiuri Giants | 96 | 58 | 36 | 2 | .617 | — | 29–15–1 | 29–21–1 |
| Shonan Searex | 96 | 50 | 43 | 3 | .538 | 7 | 23–24–1 | 27–19–2 |
| Tohoku Rakuten Golden Eagles | 96 | 46 | 45 | 5 | .505 | 10 | 24–21–3 | 22–24–2 |
| Saitama Seibu Lions | 96 | 42 | 51 | 3 | .452 | 15 | 23–25–2 | 19–26–1 |
| Chiba Lotte Marines | 96 | 37 | 53 | 6 | .411 | 18½ | 21–24–3 | 16–29–3 |
| Hokkaido Nippon-Ham Fighters | 96 | 33 | 61 | 2 | .351 | 24½ | 22–26–1 | 11–35–1 |

== Nippon Professional Baseball draft ==
2008 Saitama Seibu Lions Draft selections
| Round | Name | Position | Affiliation | Signed? |
|---|---|---|---|---|
| 1 | Yuta Nakazaki | Pitcher | Nichinan Gakuen High School | yes |
| 2 | Ryoma Nogami | Pitcher | Nissan | yes |
| 3 | Hideto Asamura | Infielder | Osaka Toin High School | yes |
| 4 | Ryo Sakata | Outfielder | Hakodate University | yes |
| 5 | Tatsuya Takeno | Catcher | Fukuoka University | yes |
| 6 | Kazuki Miyata | Pitcher | Koka Health and Medical College | yes |
