= Yūtarō =

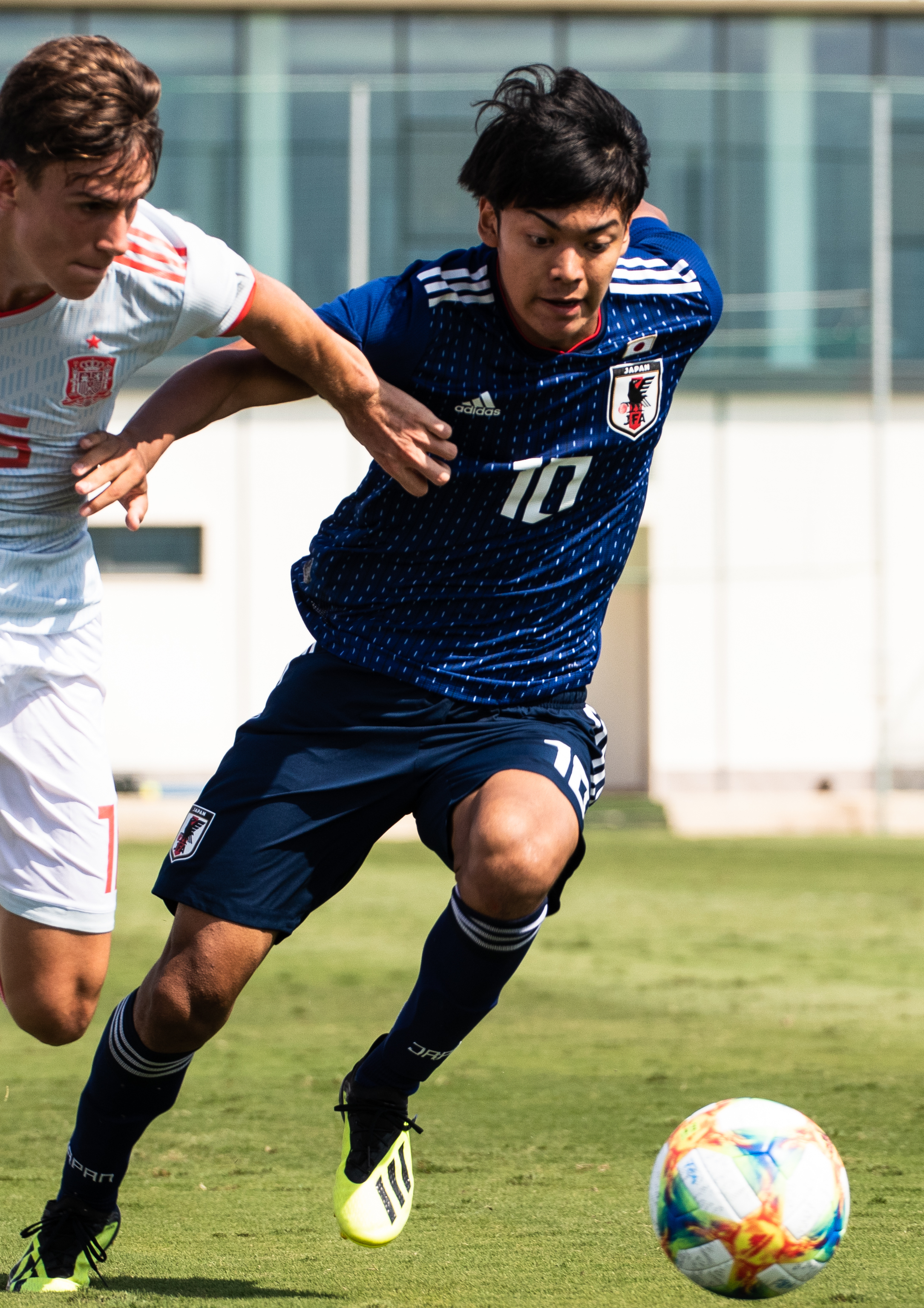
- Yutaro Oda, Japanese footballer
- Pronunciation: jɯɯtaɾoɯ (IPA)
- Gender: Male

Origin
- Origin: Japanese
- Meaning: Different meanings depending on the kanji used

Other names
- Alternative spelling: Yutaro (Kunrei-shiki) Yutaro (Nihon-shiki) Yūtarō, Yutaro, Yuutarou (Hepburn)

Yūtarō is a common Japanese given name for males.

== Written forms ==
Yūtarō can be written using different combinations of kanji characters. Here are some examples:

The characters used for "taro" (太郎) literally means "thick (big) son" and usually used as a suffix to a masculine name, especially for the first son. The "yu" part of the name can use a variety of characters, each of which will change the meaning of the name ("勇" for bravery, "優" for kindness, "悠" and so on).

- 勇太郎, "bravery, big son"
- 友太郎, "friend, big son"
- 優太郎, "kindness, big son"
- 雄太郎, "male, big son"
- 悠太郎, "calm, big son"
- 裕太郎, "abundant, big son"

Other combinations...

- 勇太朗, "bravery, thick, bright"
- 勇多朗, "bravery, many, bright"
- 勇汰朗, "bravery, excessive, bright"
- 雄太朗, "male, thick, bright"
- 悠太朗, "calm, thick, bright"

The name can also be written in hiragana ゆうたろう or katakana ユウタロウ.

== Notable people with the name ==
- Yutaro Abe (阿部 祐大朗; born 1984), Japanese footballer for Gainare Tottori
- Yutaro Chinen (知念 雄太朗; born 1993), Japanese football player
- Yutaro Hara (原 裕太郎; born 1990), Japanese footballer for Sanfrecce Hiroshima
- Yutaro Hakamata (袴田 裕太郎; born 1996), Japanese professional footballer
- Yutaro Itayama (板山 祐太郎; born 1994), Japanese baseball player
- Yutaro Miura (三浦 祐太朗; born 1984), Japanese singer-songwriter
- Yutaro Oda (小田 裕太郎; born 2001), Japanese footballer
- Yutaro Ohsaki (大﨑 雄太朗; born 1984), Japanese baseball player
- Yutaro Shin (新 裕太朗; born 1990), Japanese football player
- Yutaro Sugimoto (杉本 裕太郎; born 1991), Japanese baseball player
- Yutaro Yanagi (柳 雄太郎; born 1995), Japanese football player
- Yutaro Watanabe (渡邉 勇太朗; born 2000), Japanese baseball player
- Yutaro Takahashi (高橋 祐太郎; born 1987), Japanese footballer

== Fictional characters ==
- Yutaro Tsukayama (塚山 由太郎), a character in Rurouni Kenshin manga and anime.
- Yutaro Kindaichi (金田一 勇太郎), a character in Haikyu!! with the position of middle blocker from Aoba Johsai High
