= Osaki (disambiguation) =

Osaki is a type of spirit possession of a fox told about in legends of Japan.

Osaki, Ōsaki or Ohsaki may also refer to:

- 3626 Ohsaki, a main-belt asteroid
- Ōsaki, Kagoshima, Japan
- Ōsaki, Miyagi, Japan
- Ōsaki, Tokyo, a neighborhood in Shinagawa, Tokyo, Japan
- Ōsaki (surname), a Japanese surname
- Ōsaki Station, a railway station in Shinagawa, Tokyo, Japan
