= Koji Mitsui =

Japanese baseball player (born 1973)

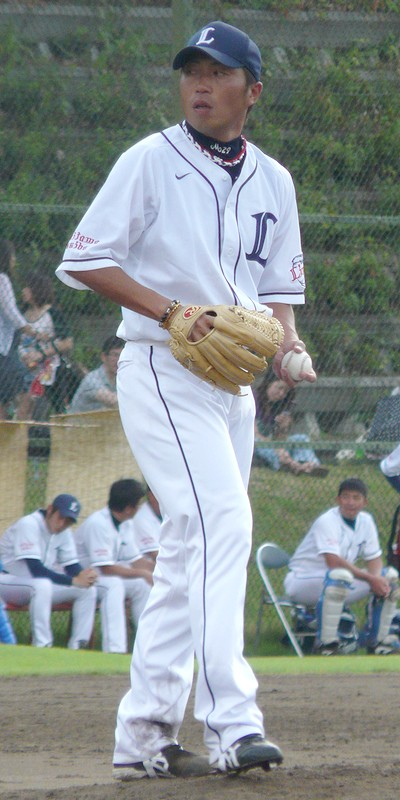
- Pitcher
- Born: September 15, 1973 (age 52); Ashoro, Hokkaido, Japan
- Bats: Left Throws: Left
- Stats at Baseball Reference

Teams
- Seibu / Saitama Seibu Lions (2001–2009)

Career highlights and awards
- 1× NPB All-Star (2002)

Koji Mitsui (三井 浩二, Mitsui Kōji; born September 15, 1973) is a Japanese retired professional baseball pitcher. He played in Nippon Professional Baseball for the Seibu / Saitama Seibu Lions from 2001 through 2009.

== Career ==
Mitsui was drafted in the 4th round of the 1991 NPB draft by the Fukuoka SoftBank Hawks, but opted not to sign. He pitched for Nippon Steel Hirohata for most of the decade. In 2000, the Seibu Lions took him in the 2nd round. He debuted in 2001, going 3–3 with a 5.22 ERA as a swingman. In 2002, he improved to 10–2, 3.15 in 16 starts and 25 relief appearances. He was 5th in the Pacific League in ERA behind Masahiko Kaneda, Koo Dae-sung, Nate Minchey and Kenichi Wakatabe. He made the Pacific League All-Star team. Mitsui had a 3.18 ERA in 3 games in the 2002 Japan Series.

In 2003, Mitsui was 11–5 with a 5.22 ERA. He was second on Seibu in wins, behind Daisuke Matsuzaka. In 2004, Mitsui was limited to 9 games, with a 7.69 ERA and 67 hits in 45 2/3 innings pitched. He was 2–3. He allowed one run in two innings in the 2004 Japan Series.

Koji moved to relief in 2005 and was 1–2 with a 4.95 ERA. The next year, Mitsui was 4–1 with a save in 45 games; he had a 1.73 ERA, best on the club. He pitched in the MLB-NPB All-Star Series that winter. In 2007, he remained effective with a 4–2, 2.22 record in 47 outings. Only Eiji Shotsu had a lower ERA on the Lions.

Mitsui struggled in 2008 as the veteran faded to 1–1, 7.50 and allowed 33 hits in 24 innings. He allowed one run in 1 1/3 innings in the 2008 Japan Series, which Seibu won.

Mitsui requested to be posted by the Lions to Major League Baseball twice in the 2008–09 offseason, but attracted no bids on either occasion.
