= Guttormson =

Guttormson is a surname. Notable people with the surname include:

- Elman Guttormson (1929–2000), Canadian politician
- Rick Guttormson (born 1977), American baseball player
