= Ōsaki (surname) =

Ōsaki, Osaki, Oosaki or Ohsaki (written: 大崎, 大﨑, or 桜咲) is a Japanese surname. Notable people with the surname include:

- Junya Osaki (大﨑 淳矢; born 1991), Japanese footballer
- Leo Osaki (大崎 玲央; born 1991), Japanese-born American soccer player
- Makoto Osaki, developer and supervisor at Sega AM2, involved with the Shenmue, Out Run, and Virtua Fighter games, among others
- Sakae Osaki (大崎 栄; born 1964), Japanese long-distance runner
- Yoshihiko Osaki (大崎 剛彦; 1939–2015), Japanese swimmer
- Yutaro Ohsaki (大﨑 雄太朗; born 1984), Japanese baseball player
- Shotaro (rapper), full name Shōtarō Ōsaki (大崎 将太郎; born 2000), Japanese rapper, singer and dancer

== Fictional characters ==
- Nana Osaki (大崎 ナナ), a character in the manga series Nana
- Akane Osaki (桜咲 朱音), a character in the manga series Akane-banashi
