= Takayuki Kishi =

Japanese baseball player (born 1984)

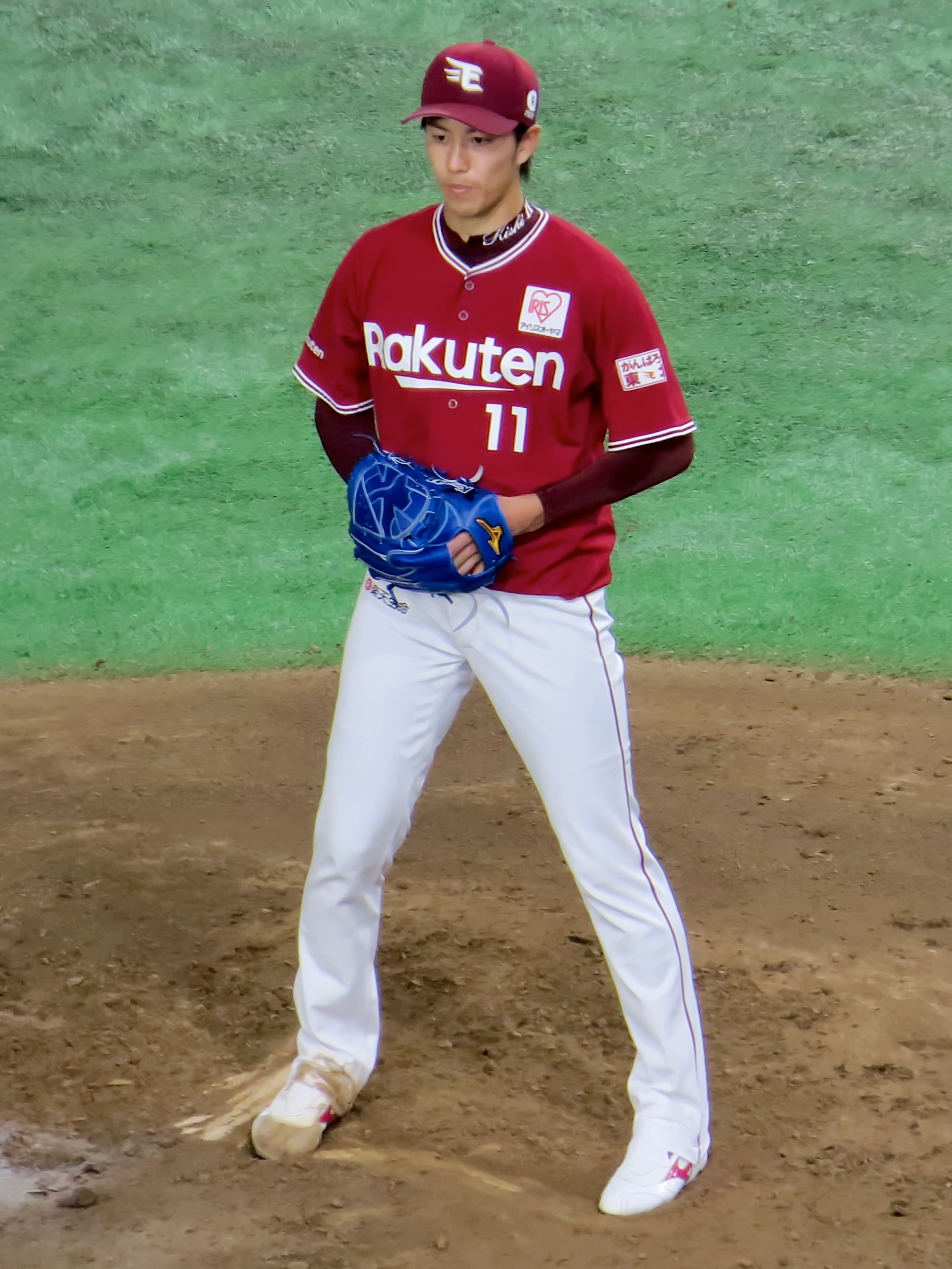
- Kishi with the Tohoku Rakuten Golden Eagles

Tohoku Rakuten Golden Eagles – No. 11
- Pitcher
- Born: December 4, 1984 (age 40); Sendai, Miyagi, Japan
- Bats: Right Throws: Right

NPB debut
- March 30, 2007, for the Seibu Lions

NPB statistics (through 2025 season)
- Win–loss record: 170–126
- Earned run average: 3.11
- Strikeouts: 2,200

Teams
- Seibu Lions/Saitama Seibu Lions (2007–2016); Tohoku Rakuten Golden Eagles (2017–present)

Career highlights and awards
- Pacific League Special Award (2007); 2008 Japan Series MVP; 5× NPB All-Star (2009, 2012, 2014, 2018, 2022); Pacific League ERA champion (2018); Mitsui Golden Glove Award (2018); Pitched a no-hitter on May 2, 2014
Medals
Men's baseball
Representing Japan
WBSC Premier12
Gold medal – first place	2019 Tokyo	Team

Takayuki Kishi (Japanese: 岸 孝之, born December 4, 1984, in Taihaku-ku, Sendai) is a Japanese professional baseball pitcher for the Tohoku Rakuten Golden Eagles of the Nippon Professional Baseball (NPB). He has previously played in NPB for the Saitama Seibu Lions. He was the 2008 Japan Series MVP.

== Career ==
=== Saitama Seibu Lions ===
In his first three seasons as a professional, Kishi has recorded at least 10 wins every season, thrown at least 2 complete games every season, and has multiple shutouts in two of his first three seasons. With an overhand delivery Kishi throws a four-seam fastball in high 80s (tops out at 93 mph), changeup, slider and a solid-average curveball around 70 mph.

==== 2008 Japan Series ====
Kishi showed that even though he was young, he could handle the atmosphere of the Japan Series, and also demonstrated his rubber arm. His first appearance in the Series was when he started Game 4 at the Seibu Dome. The second-year pro dominated the heavily favored Yomiuri Giants for a complete-game shutout, striking out at least one batter every inning and throwing a whopping 147 pitches in the process. Kishi also became the second pitcher ever to have at least one strikeout every inning in a complete game effort. In an ironic twist, the first was former Giants pitcher Takashi Nishimoto in the 1981 Japan Series against the Nippon-Ham Fighters. Kishi also became the 12th pitcher to throw a complete-game shutout in his first career Japan Series start, with the last one before him being Shunsuke Watanabe in the 2005 Japan Series against the Hanshin Tigers.

In Game 6 two days later, Kishi was called upon again, this time to save the Lions' season. He replaced Lions starter Kazuyuki Hoashi and, on just two days' rest, threw 91 pitches in 5 2/3 scoreless innings as Seibu rallied to force Game 7. Kishi got the win in relief and also set a new Series record for consecutive scoreless innings at 14 2/3.

=== Tohoku Rakuten Golden Eagles ===
He was selected 2018 NPB All-Star game.

== International career ==
Kishi represented the Japan national baseball team in the 2018 MLB Japan All-Star Series and 2019 WBSC Premier12.

On October 10, 2018, he was selected at the 2018 MLB Japan All-Star Series.

On October 1, 2019, he was selected at the 2019 WBSC Premier12.
