= Hisashi Takayama =

Japanese baseball player and coach

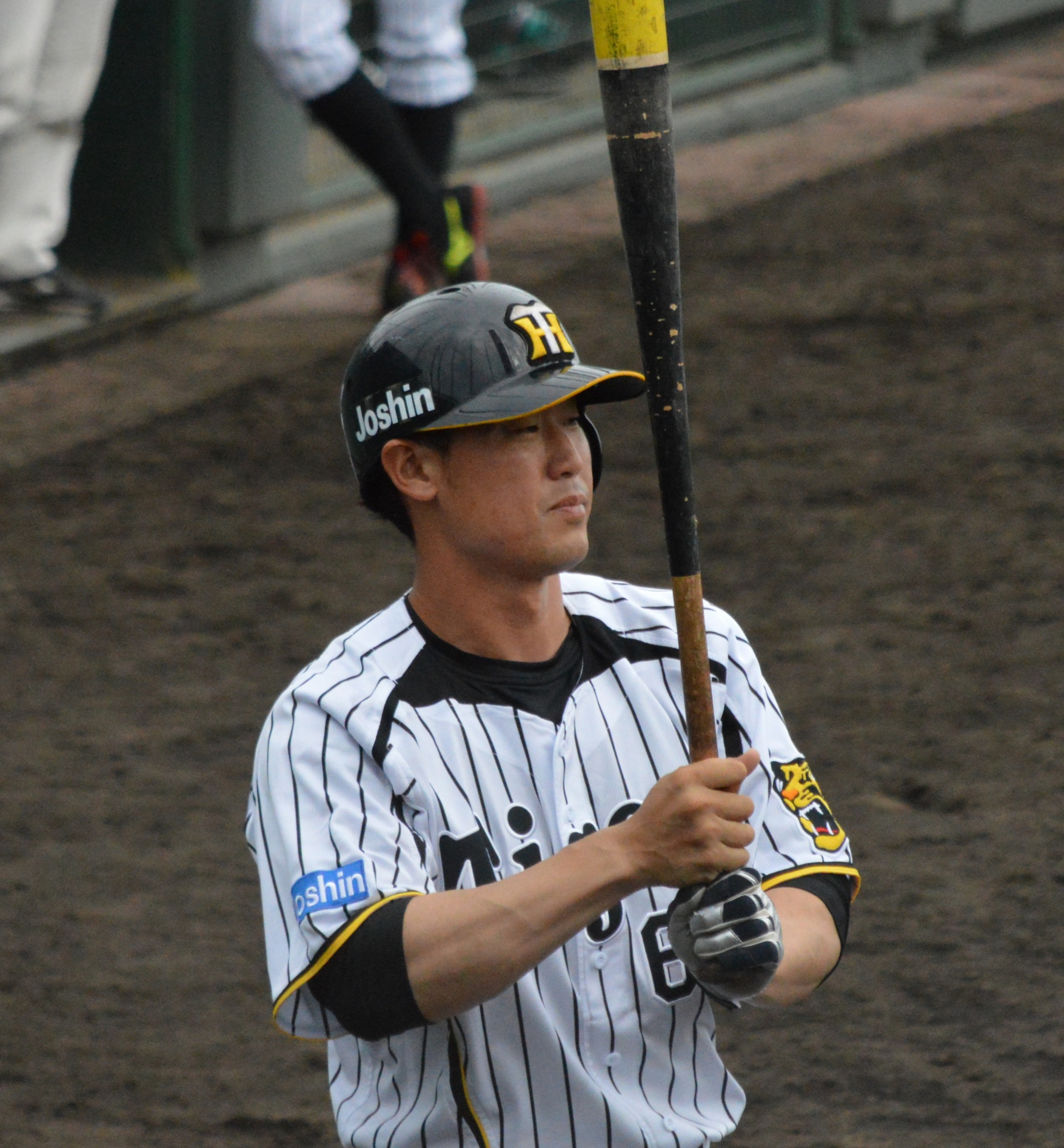

Saitama Seibu Lions – No. 91
- Outfielder / Coach
- Born: November 16, 1981 (age 43); Kumamoto, Kumamoto, Japan
- Batted: Right Threw: Right

NPB debut
- April 15, 2000, for the Seibu Lions

Last NPB appearance
- July 13, 2013, for the Hanshin Tigers

NPB statistics
- Batting average: .250
- Hits: 227
- Home runs: 25
- RBI: 108
- Stolen bases: 8

Teams
- As player: Seibu Lions / Saitama Seibu Lions (2000–2013); Hanshin Tigers (2013–2014); As coach: Saitama Seibu Lions (2021–present)

Career highlights and awards
- 2× Japan Series Champion (2004, 2008)

Hisashi Takayama (高山 久, Takayama Hisashi; born November 16, 1981) is a former baseball player from Japan. He played for Saitama Seibu Lions and Hanshin Tigers.
