= Yasuyuki Kataoka =

Japanese baseball player

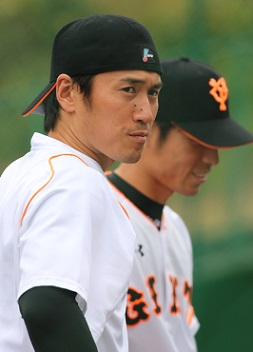
- Kataoka with the Yomiuri Giants
- Infielder/Coach
- Born: February 17, 1983 (age 42); Chiba, Japan
- Bats: Right Throws: Right

NPB debut
- March 26, 2005, for the Seibu Lions

NPB statistics (through 2016 season)
- Batting average: .266
- Hits: 1174
- RBIs: 389
- Stolen bases: 320

Teams
- As player: Seibu Lions (2005–2013); Yomiuri Giants (2014–2017); As coach: Yomiuri Giants (2018–2021)

Career highlights and awards
- 4× Pacific League stolen base champion (2007 – 2010); 2008 Pacific League Best Nine Award; Japan Series champion (2008); 2× NPB All-Star selection (2008, 2010)
Medals
Representing Japan
Men's baseball
World Baseball Classic
| Gold medal – first place | 2009 Los Angeles | Team |

Yasuyuki Kataoka (片岡 保幸, Kataoka Yasuyuki; born February 17, 1983 in Hanamigawa-ku, Chiba, Japan) is a Japanese former Nippon Professional Baseball player. He played for the Seibu Lions in Japan’s Pacific League and the Yomiuri Giants in the Central League.

His wife is Japanese talent artist Becky. On 17 March 2020 the couple announced the birth of their first child, and their second child was born on 20 August 2021.
