= Toyama Municipal Baseball Stadium Alpen Stadium =

Multi-purpose stadium in Toyama, Japan

Coordinates: 36°43′51″N 137°15′43″E

Toyama Municipal Baseball Stadium (富山市民球場アルペンスタジアム, Toyama Shimin Kyūjō Arupen Sutajiamu) is a multi-purpose stadium in Toyama, Japan. Built in 1992, it holds 30,000 people and is currently used mostly for baseball matches.

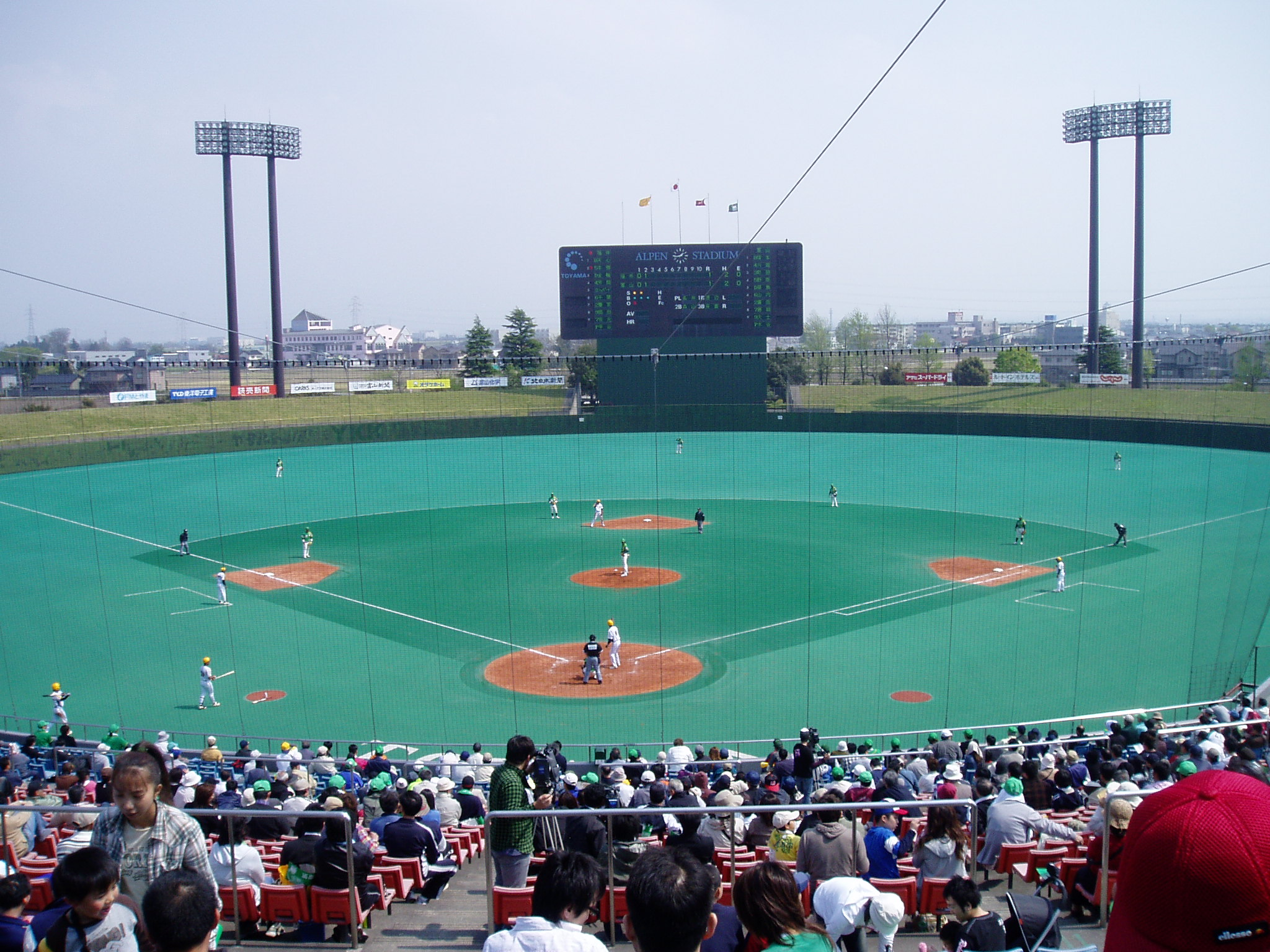
