= Atsushi Okamoto =

Japanese baseball player

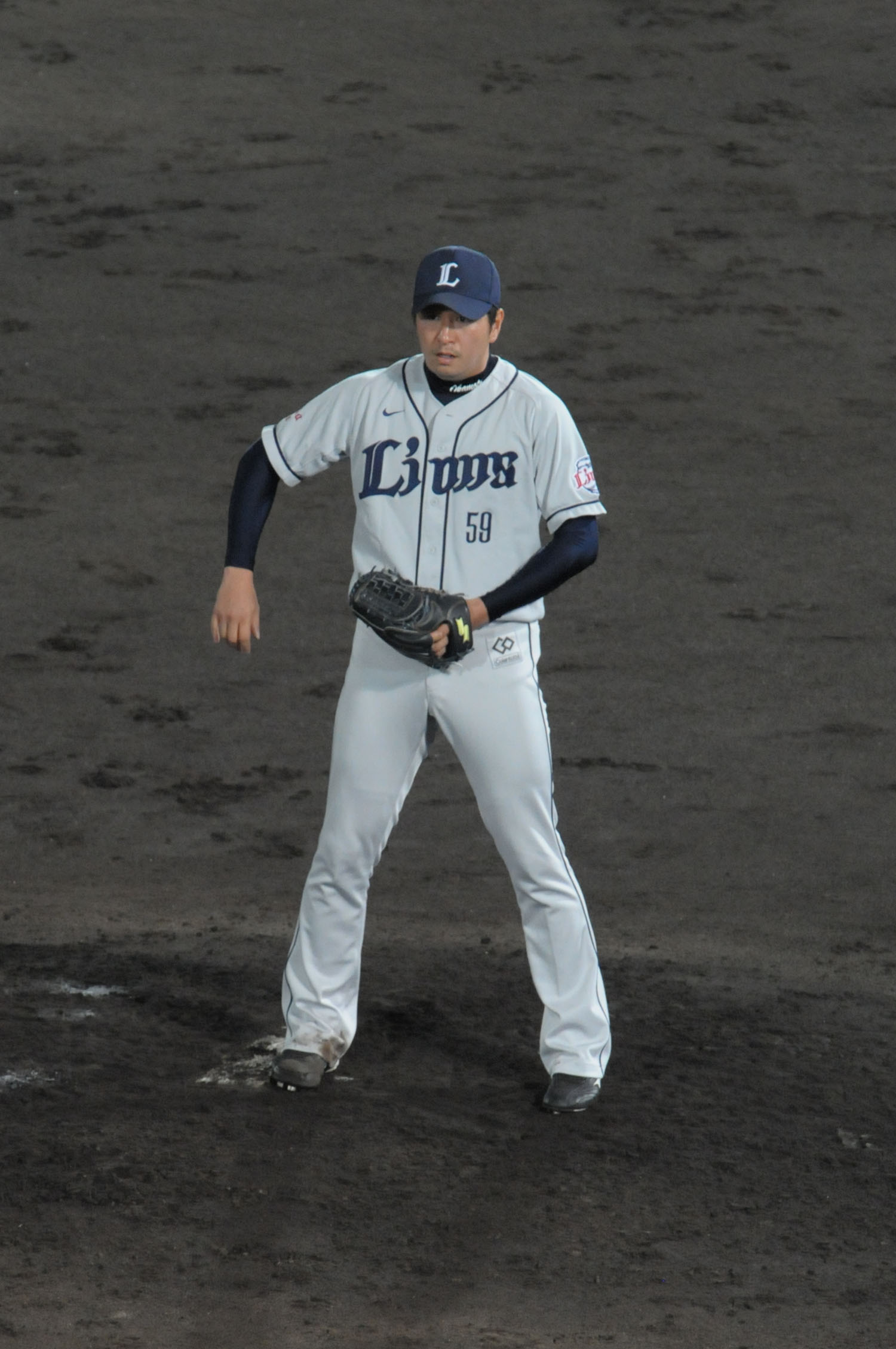
- Okamoto with the Saitama Seibu Lions
- Pitcher
- Born: May 20, 1981 (age 44); Mie, Japan
- Bats: Right Throws: Right

NPB debut
- June 12, 2004, for the Seibu Lions

NPB statistics (through 2008 season)
- Win–loss: 1–4
- ERA: 8.90
- Strikeouts: 42

Teams
- Seibu Lions/Saitama Seibu Lions (2004–2016)
- Last updated on: April 16, 2020

Atsushi Okamoto (岡本 篤志, Okamoto Atsushi; born May 20, 1981) is a Japanese former professional Nippon Professional Baseball player. He played his entire career for the Saitama Seibu Lions in Japan's Pacific League.
