= Satoshi Yamazaki =

Japanese baseball player

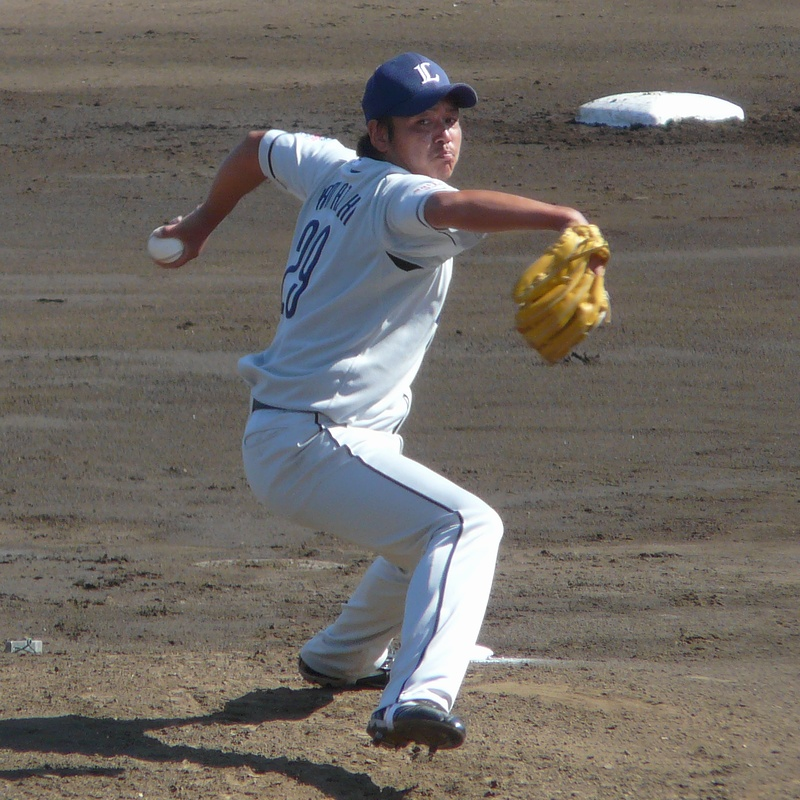
- Pitcher
- Born: April 8, 1981 (age 45); Gunma, Japan
- Bats: Left Throws: Left

NPB debut
- May 8, 2004, for the Seibu Lions

NPB statistics (through 2008 season)
- Win–loss: 6–4
- ERA: 5.15
- Strikeouts: 90
- Stats at Baseball Reference

Teams
- Seibu Lions/Saitama Seibu Lions (2004–2011)

Satoshi Yamazaki (山崎 敏, Yamazaki Satoshi; born in Gunma, Japan) is a Japanese professional Nippon Professional Baseball player. He is 5 ft 6 in (168 cm) in height and currently with the Saitama Seibu Lions in Japan's Pacific League.
