= Craig Brazell =

American baseball player (born 1980)

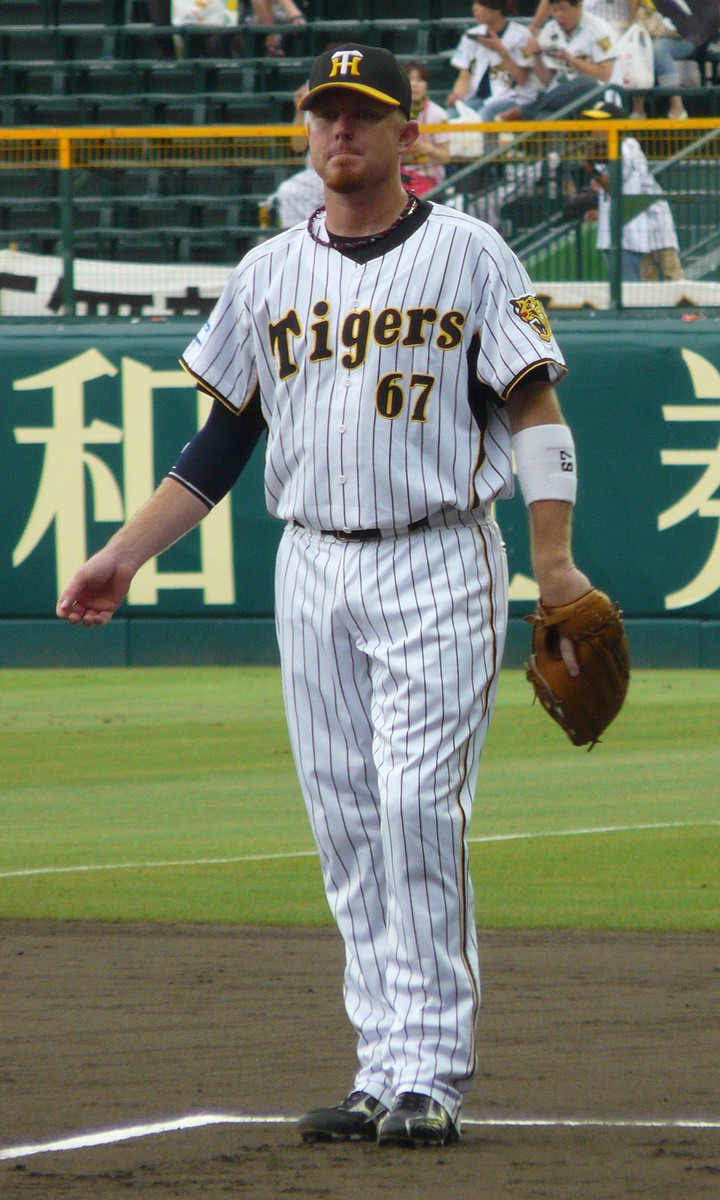
- First baseman
- Born: May 10, 1980 (age 46); Montgomery, Alabama, U.S.
- Bats: Left Throws: Right

Professional debut
- MLB: August 17, 2004, for the New York Mets
- NPB: 2008, for the Saitama Seibu Lions

MLB statistics
- Batting average: .265
- Home runs: 1
- Runs batted in: 3

NPB statistics
- Batting average: .269
- Home runs: 133
- Runs batted in: 412
- Stats at Baseball Reference

Teams
- New York Mets (2004); Kansas City Royals (2007); Saitama Seibu Lions (2008); Hanshin Tigers (2009–2012); Chiba Lotte Marines (2013–2014)

Craig Walter Brazell (born May 10, 1980) is an American former professional baseball player, where he played as a first baseman.

== Early life ==
Brazell attended Jefferson Davis High School in Montgomery, Alabama. He hit .536 in his senior year to capture the All-Metro batting championship. He was drafted out of high school by the New York Mets as the 154th overall pick in the 5th round of the 1998 Major League Baseball draft.

== Baseball career ==
Brazell played in Rookie ball from 1998 to 1999. He began playing in Single-A in 2000 and did not get promoted to Double-A until 2002. He was promoted to Triple-A in 2003.

Brazell made his major league debut on August 17, 2004, for the New York Mets. He played first base and played a total of 24 games, mainly as a pinch hitter. He hit his first and only major league home run on September 25, an 11th inning walk-off home run that significantly crippled the Chicago Cubs hopes of returning to the playoffs. In 2005, he only played in Triple-A for the Norfolk Tides and was released after the season.

He signed a minor league contract with the Los Angeles Dodgers for the 2006 season. He played for the Jacksonville Suns, their Double-A affiliate, for the whole season. He hit just .249 with 21 home runs in 421 at-bats for the Suns. He was released following the 2006 season.

He signed a minor league contract with the Kansas City Royals for the 2007 season. He began playing for the Wichita Wranglers, the Royals Double-A affiliate, in the 2007 season. He played 30 games and batted .349 with 7 home runs in 109 at-bats before being promoted to the Omaha Royals, the Royals Triple-A team. He made the Pacific Coast League All-Star team and finished the season with Omaha batting .307 with 32 home runs. His combined 39 home runs led the minor leagues in 2007, as he won the Joe Bauman Home Run Award. He was released by the Royals on November 28, 2007.

On December 6, 2007, Brazell agreed to a contract with the Saitama Seibu Lions of Japan's Nippon Professional Baseball. He was released after hitting .234 with 27 home runs and 87 RBI.

On January 15, 2009, he signed a minor league contract with the Baltimore Orioles, only to be released in April 2009.

After a short stint with the St. Paul Saints of the American Association, an independent league, Brazell signed with the Hanshin Tigers of Nippon Professional Baseball on May 28, 2009. After four seasons in Japan, on February 7, 2013, he signed a new contract with the St. Paul Saints. He went back to Japan after signing a contract with Chiba Lotte Marines in June 2013. He retired at the end of 2014.
