= Tsuyoshi Kawagishi =

Japanese baseball player & coach (born 1979)

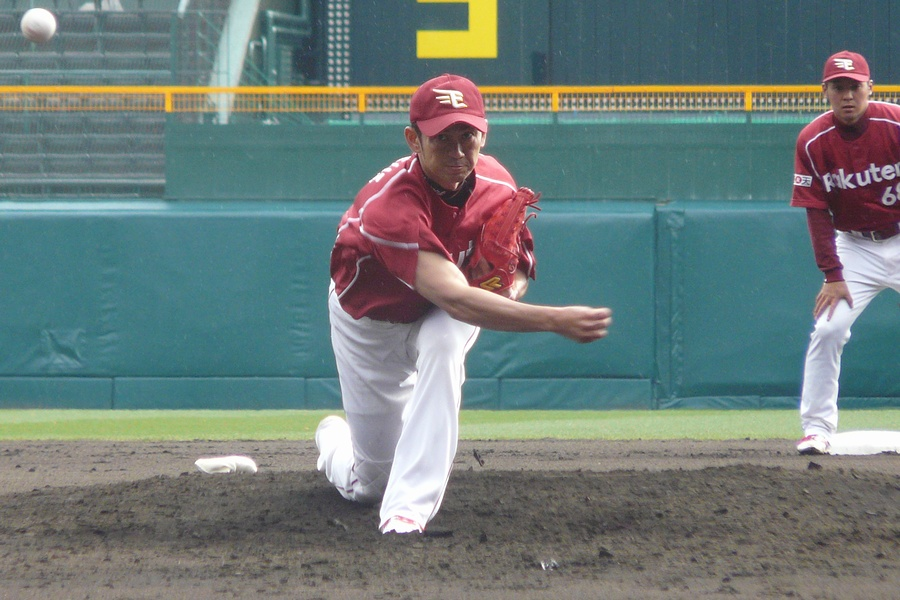

Rakuten Monkeys – No. 73
- Pitcher / Coach
- Born: September 12, 1979 (age 46); Sagamihara, Kanagawa, Japan
- Batted: Right Threw: Right

NPB debut
- April 2, 2004, for the Chunichi Dragons

Last NPB appearance
- August 25, 2011, for the Tohoku Rakuten Golden Eagles

NPB statistics
- Win–loss record: 12-14
- Earned run average: 4.27
- Strikeouts: 163
- Stats at Baseball Reference

Teams
- As player: Chunichi Dragons (2004–2006); Tohoku Rakuten Golden Eagles (2007–2012); As coach: Rakuten Monkeys (2022–present)

Career highlights and awards
- As coach: Taiwan Series champion (2025)

Tsuyoshi Kawagishi (川岸 強, Kawagishi Tsuyoshi; born September 12, 1979) is a Japanese former professional baseball pitcher who currently serves as the pitching coach for the Rakuten Monkeys of the Chinese Professional Baseball League (CPBL). He played in Nippon Professional Baseball (NPB) for the Chunichi Dragons and Tohoku Rakuten Golden Eagles.

== Career ==
On October 5, 2021, Kawagishi was named as a coach for the Rakuten Monkeys of the Chinese Professional Baseball League.
