= Ryo Sakata =

Japanese baseball player (born 1986)

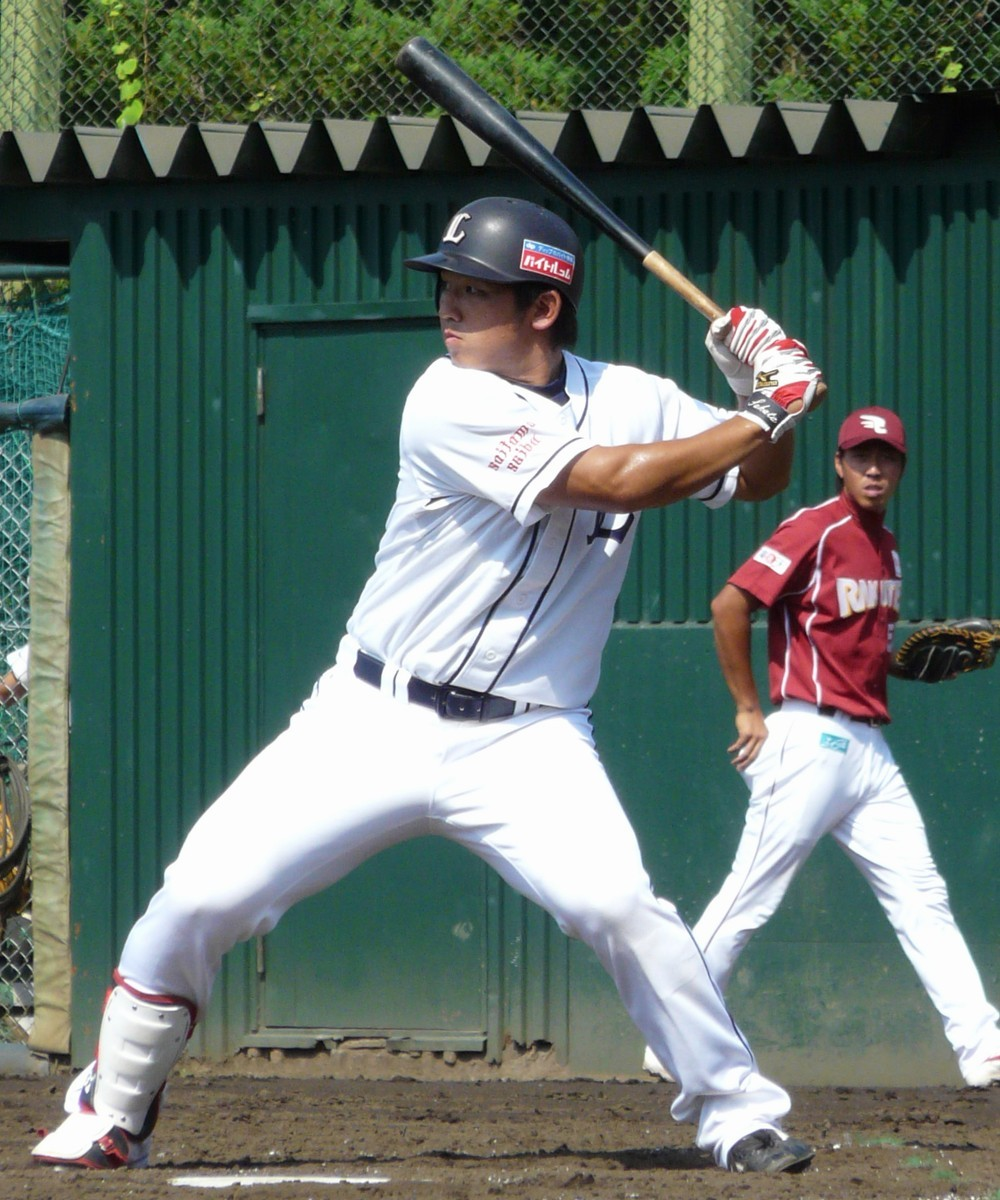
- Sakata with the Saitama Seibu Lions
- Outfielder
- Born: October 2, 1986 (age 40)
- Bats: Left Throws: Right

NPB debut
- May 6, 2009, for the Saitama Seibu Lions

NPB statistics (through 2016 season)
- Batting average: .239
- Home runs: 19
- RBI: 95
- Stats at Baseball Reference

Teams
- Saitama Seibu Lions (2009–2018)

Ryo Sakata (坂田 遼, born October 2, 1986, in Yokosuka, Kanagawa) is a Japanese professional baseball outfielder for the Saitama Seibu Lions in Japan's Nippon Professional Baseball.
