= Shogo Akada =

Japanese baseball player (born 1980)

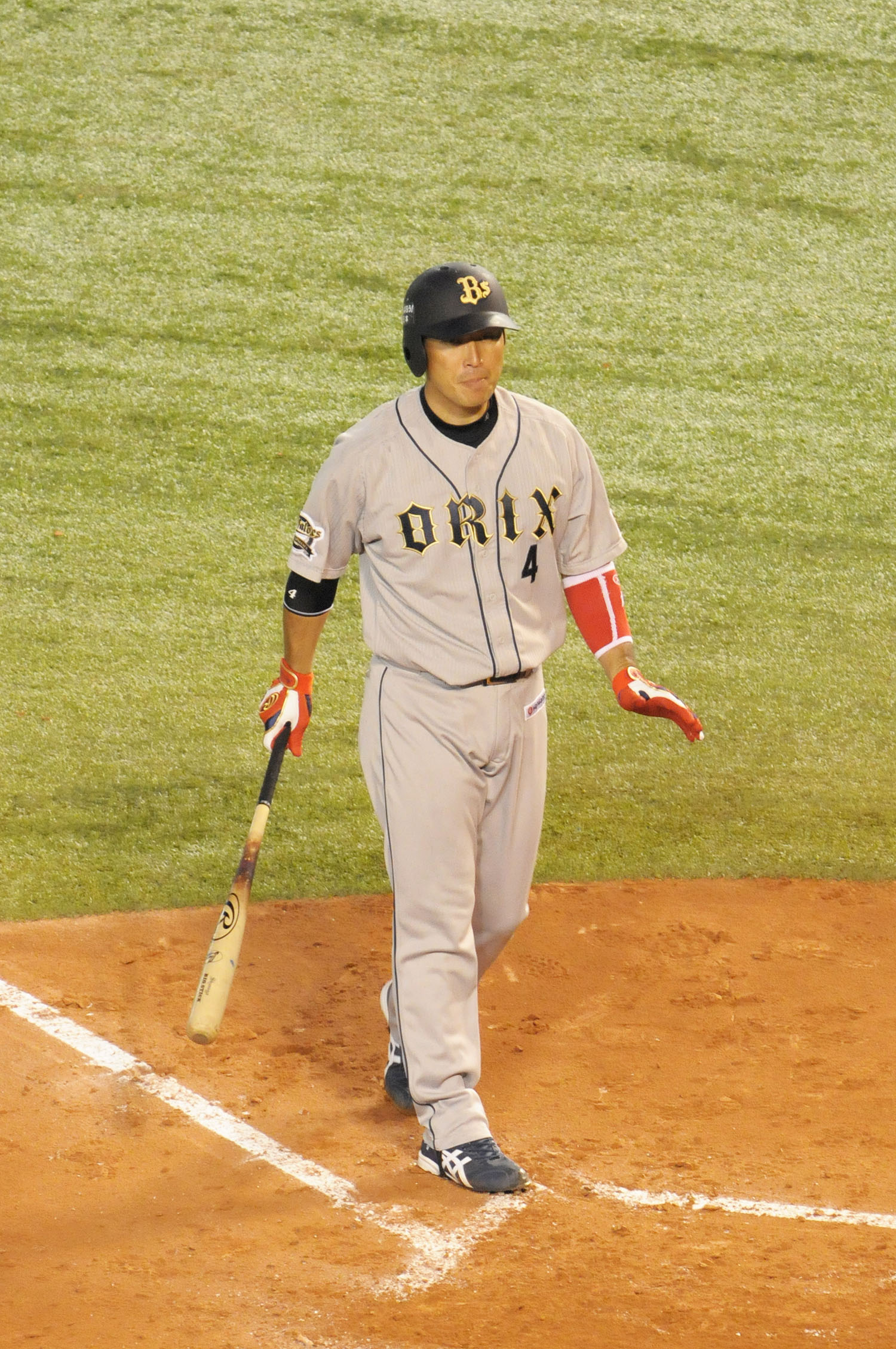
- Akada with the Orix Buffaloes

Saitama Seibu Lions – No. 77
- Outfielder / Coach
- Born: September 1, 1980 (age 45); Kagoshima, Japan
- Batted: Switch Threw: Right

NPB debut
- August 20, 1999, for the Seibu Lions

Last NPB appearance
- October 20, 2014, for the Hokkaido Nippon-Ham Fighters

NPB statistics (through 2014 season)
- At bats: 2525
- Hits: 643
- RBIs: 211
- Batting average: .255
- Home runs: 30
- Stolen bases: 75

Teams
- As player: Seibu Lions/Saitama Seibu Lions (1999–2009); Orix Buffaloes (2010–2012); Hokkaido Nippon-Ham Fighters (2013–2014); As coach: Saitama Seibu Lions (2015–present)
- Last updated on: December 19, 2013

Shogo Akada (赤田 将吾, Akada Shogo; born in Kagoshima, Japan) is a former professional Nippon Professional Baseball player.
