= Koji Onuma =

Japanese baseball player

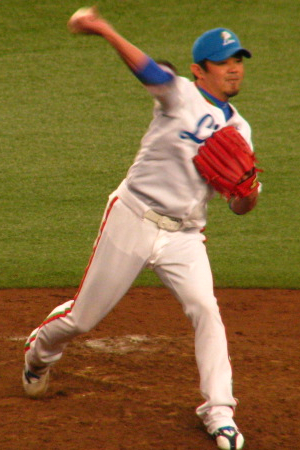
- Onuma with the Saitama Seibu Lions in 2009
- Pitcher
- Born: July 3, 1979 (age 46); Higashiōsaka, Osaka, Japan
- Batted: Right Threw: Right

NPB debut
- May 6, 2001, for the Seibu Lions

Last NPB appearance
- October 13, 2012, for the Yokohama DeNA BayStars

NPB statistics
- Win–loss record: 18–30
- Earned run average: 5.46
- Strikeouts: 334
- Stats at Baseball Reference

Teams
- Seibu Lions / Saitama Seibu Lions (2001–2010); Yokohama BayStars / Yokohama DeNA BayStars (2011–2012)

Koji Onuma (大沼 幸二, Ōnuma Kōji; born July 3, 1979) is a Japanese former professional baseball pitcher who most recently played in Nippon Professional Baseball for the Yokohama DeNA BayStars in Japan's Central League.
