= Shinsuke Ogura =

Japanese baseball player (born 1980)

- Pitcher
- Born: August 1, 1980 (age 45); Fukuoka, Japan
- Bats: Left Throws: Left

NPB debut
- October 3, 2001, for the Fukuoka Daiei Hawks

Teams
- Fukuoka Daiei Hawks/Fukuoka SoftBank Hawks (1999–2012)

Shinsuke Ogura (小椋 真介, Ogura Shinsuke; born 1 August 1980, Fukuoka, Fukuoka-ken) is a Japanese baseball player. He has been with the Fukuoka SoftBank Hawks since 1999, and plays as pitcher, wearing number 16.
