= Takuya Hara (baseball) =

Japanese baseball player (born 1984)

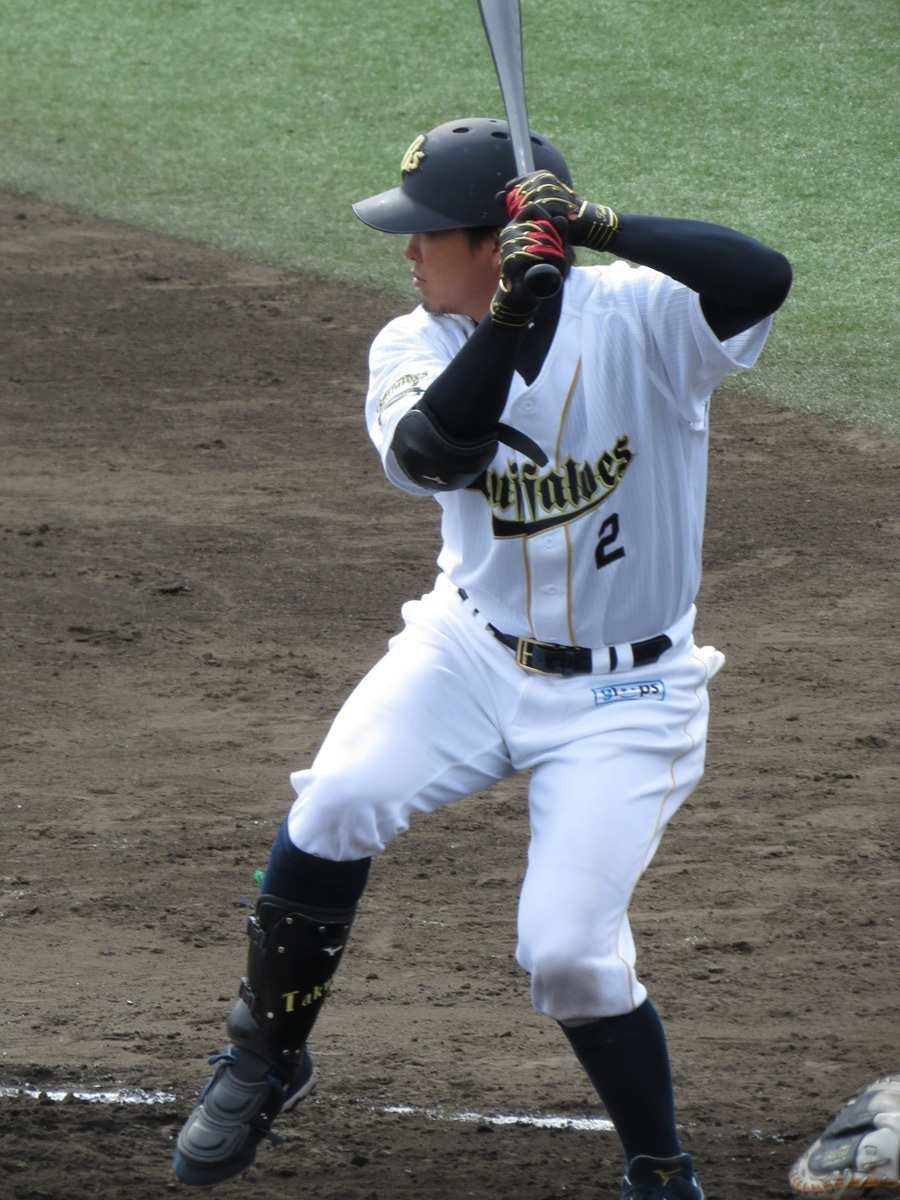
- Hara with the Orix Buffaloes
- Infielder
- Born: May 18, 1984 (age 41); Yokohama, Kanagawa, Japan
- Bats: Left Throws: Right

NPB debut
- June 13, 2007, for the Seibu Lions

NPB statistics (through 2016)
- Batting average: .223
- Home runs: 6
- RBI: 76
- Stats at Baseball Reference

Teams
- Seibu Lions/Saitama Seibu Lions (2007–2012); Orix Buffaloes (2013–2016)

Takuya Hara (原 拓也, Hara Takuya; born May 18, 1984 in Yokohama, Kanagawa, Japan) is a Japanese professional baseball infielder for the Orix Buffaloes in Japan's Nippon Professional Baseball.
