= Ryo Watanabe (pitcher) =

Japanese baseball player

Ryo Watanabe 渡辺 亮
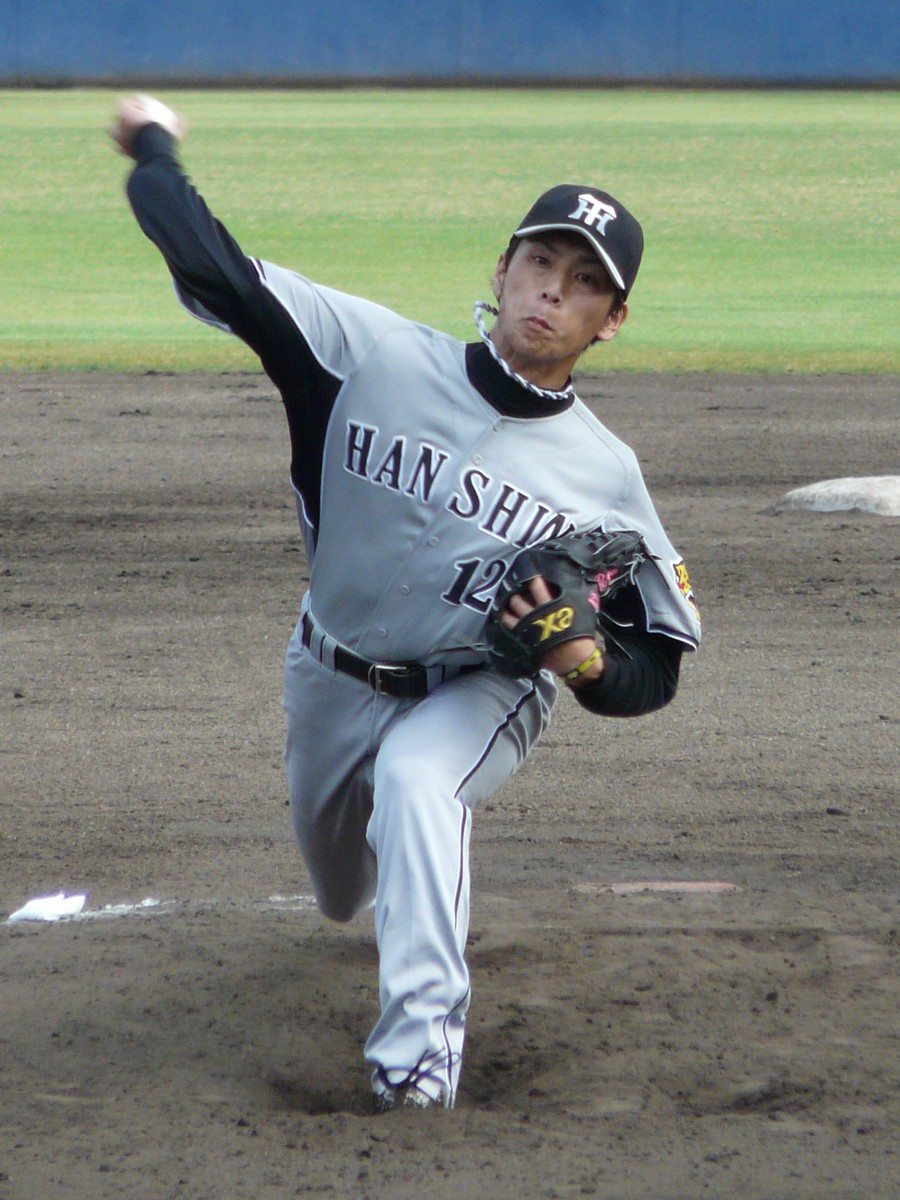
- Watanabe with the Hanshin Tigers

Hanshin Tigers – No. 89
- Pitcher
- Born: February 10, 1982 (age 44); Naruto, Tokushima, Japan
- Bats: Right Throws: Right

NPB debut
- April 22, 2007, for the Hanshin Tigers

NPB statistics (through 2015)
- Games: 362
- Win–loss: 15–6
- ERA: 2.64
- Stats at Baseball Reference

Teams
- As player: Hanshin Tigers (2006–2015); As coach: Hanshin Tigers (2024–present)

Ryo Watanabe (渡辺 亮, Watanabe Ryō; real name: 渡邊 亮, born February 10, 1982, in Naruto, Tokushima, Japan) is a retired Nippon Professional Baseball pitcher who spent 10 years with the Hanshin Tigers in Japan's Central League.

== Professional career ==
Watanabe joined the Hanshin Tigers after being picked in the fourth round of the 2005 university/adult draft. After spending his first season with the Tigers' farm team, he enjoyed relative success as a reliever, appearing in at least 45 matches between the years 2007 and 2012, earning a total 14 wins, 6 losses and 53 hold points from 332 appearances with an ERA of 2.53. He was used less starting from the 2013 season and only made one first-team appearance in 2015, pitching one scoreless inning.
