= Tatsuyuki Uemoto =

Japanese baseball player (born 1980)

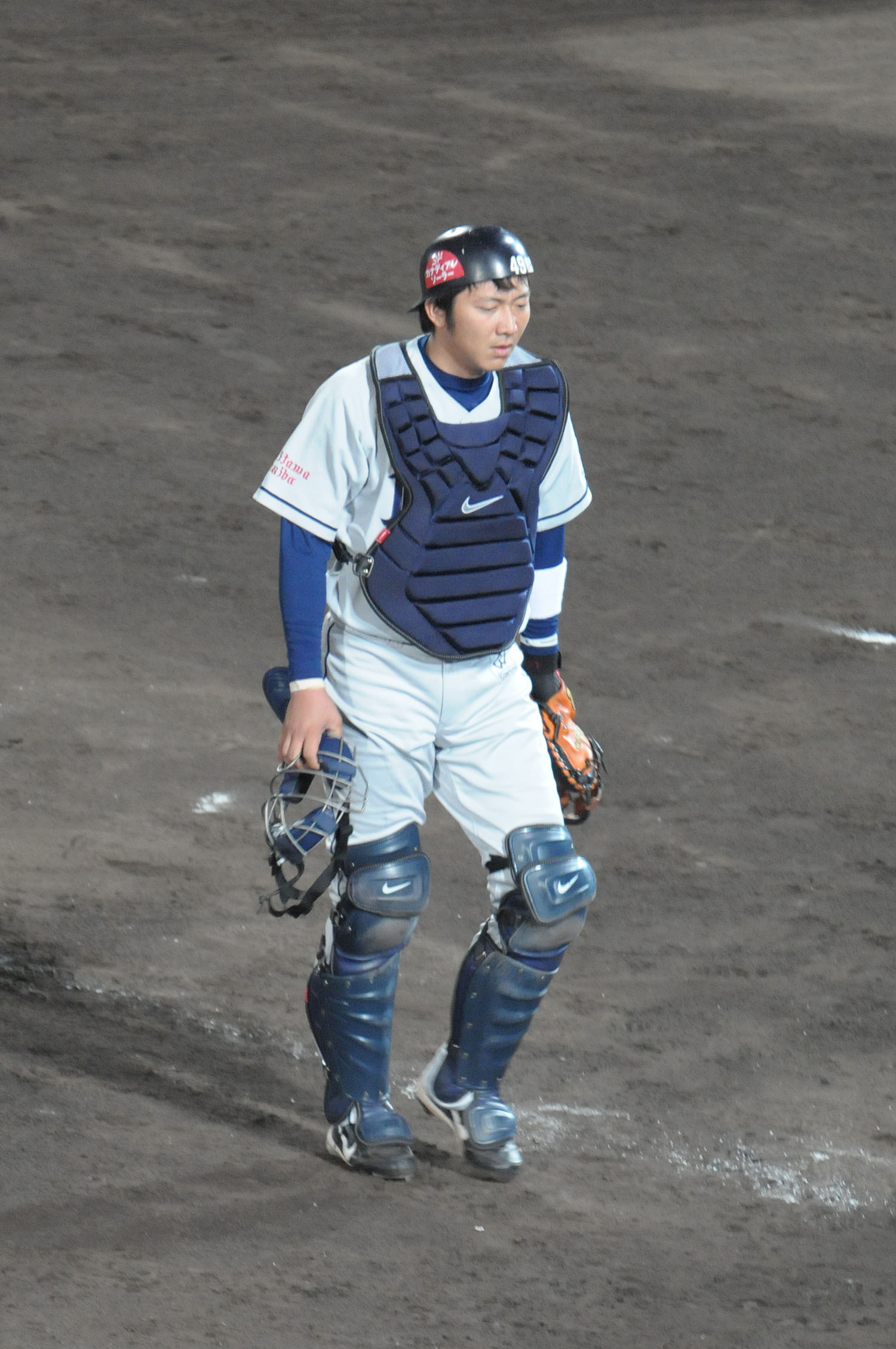
- Catcher / Coach
- Born: November 8, 1980 (age 45)
- Batted: Left Threw: Right

NPB debut
- August 18, 2005, for the Seibu Lions

Last NPB appearance
- 2017, for the Saitama Seibu Lions

NPB statistics (through 2017 season)
- Batting average: .226
- Home runs: 13
- RBI: 78

Teams
- As player: Seibu Lions/Saitama Seibu Lions (2003–2017); As coach: Saitama Seibu Lions (2020–2022)

Tatsuyuki Uemoto (上本 達之, born November 8, 1980, in Ube, Yamaguchi) is a Japanese professional baseball catcher for the Saitama Seibu Lions in Japan's Nippon Professional Baseball.
