= Hiroyuki Oshima (baseball) =

Japanese baseball player (born 1981)

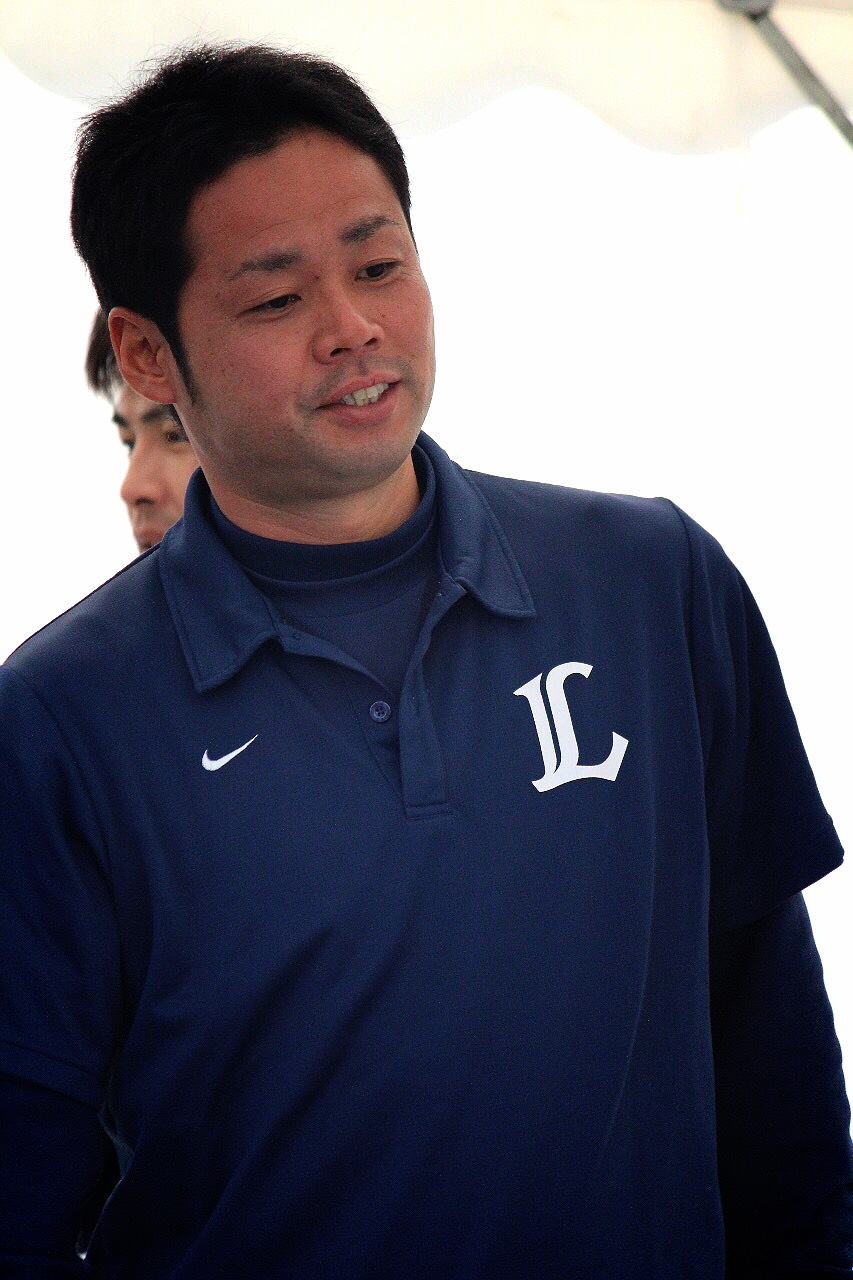

Saitama Seibu Lions – No. 88
- Outfielder / Coach
- Born: June 15, 1981 (age 44); Saitama, Saitama, Japan
- Batted: Right Threw: Right

NPB debut
- April 14, 2002, for the Seibu Lions

Last appearance
- June 28, 2012, for the Saitama Seibu Lions

NPB statistics
- Batting average: .253
- Hits: 232
- Home runs: 23
- Runs batted in: 106
- Stolen base: 3

Teams
- As player: Seibu Lions/Saitama Seibu Lions (2000–2012); As coach: Saitama Seibu Lions (2023–present)

Hiroyuki Ōshima (大島 裕行, Ōshima Hiroyuki; born June 15, 1981 in Saitama, Saitama) is a retired Japanese professional outfielder.
