= Tomoki Hoshino =

Japanese baseball player

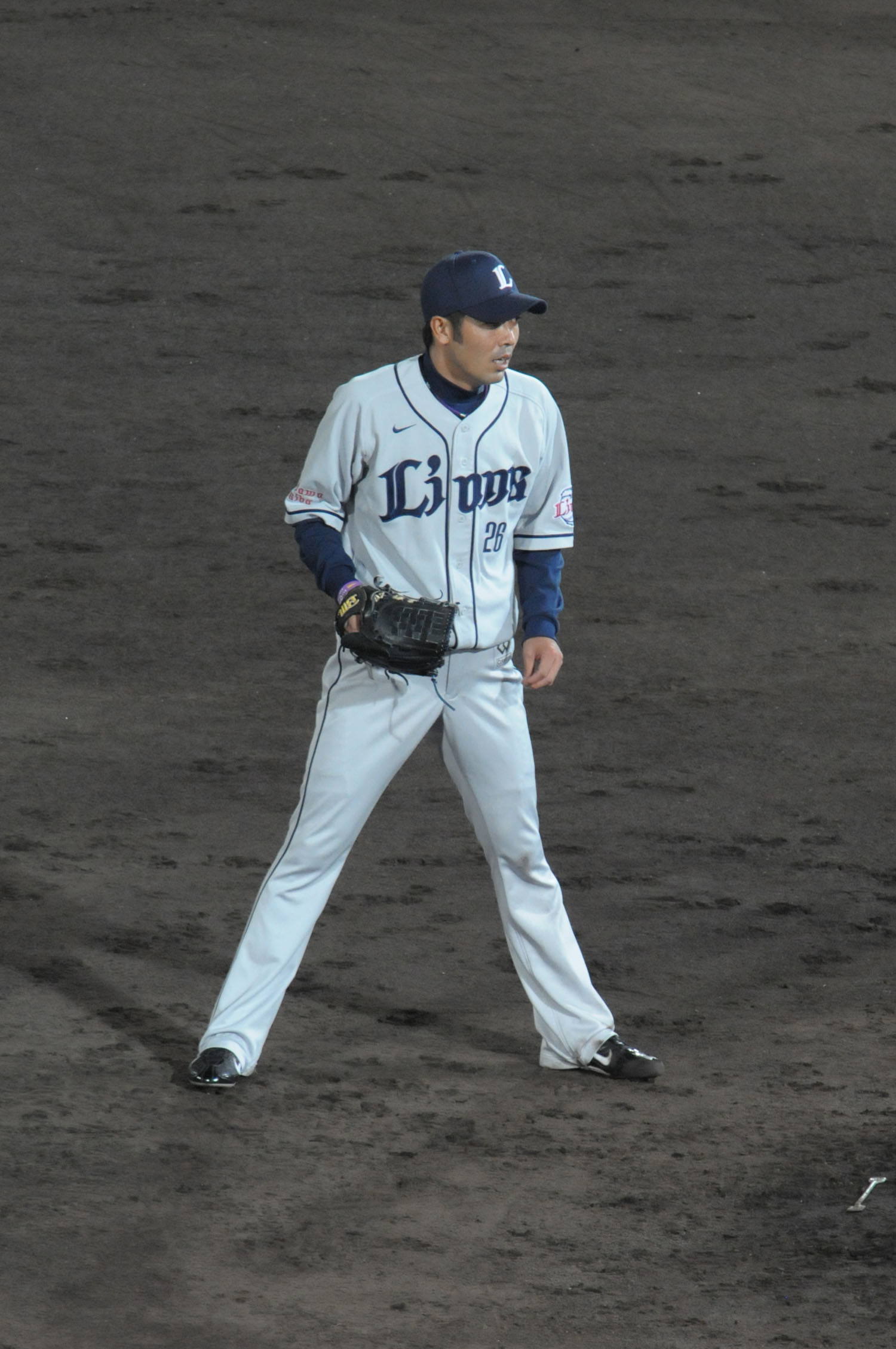
- Pitcher
- Born: July 29, 1977 (age 48); Mie, Japan
- Bats: Left Throws: Left

NPB debut
- April 6, 1999, for the Seibu Lions

NPB statistics (through 2008 season)
- ERA: 3.49
- Win–loss–tie: 13–13–1
- Strikeouts: 244
- Stats at Baseball Reference

Teams
- Seibu Lions/Saitama Seibu Lions (1999–2012); Tohoku Rakuten Golden Eagles (2013)
- Last updated on: 26 January 2009

Tomoki Hoshino (星野 智樹, Hoshino Tomoki; born in Mie, Japan) is a professional Japanese Nippon Professional Baseball player. He is currently with the Tohoku Rakuten Golden Eagles in Japan's Pacific League.
