= Eiji Shotsu =

Japanese baseball player

- Pitcher
- Born: November 13, 1972 (age 53); Fukui, Japan
- Bats: Right Throws: Right

NPB debut
- April 3, 1998, for the Chunichi Dragons

NPB statistics (through 2008 season)
- ERA: 3.39
- Win–loss: 25–9
- Strikeouts: 291

Teams
- Chunichi Dragons (1998–2004); Seibu Lions/Saitama Seibu Lions (2005–2009)
- Last updated on: 26 January 2009

Eiji Shotsu (正津 英志, Shotsu Eiji; born November 13, 1972) is a Japanese professional Nippon Professional Baseball player. He is currently with the Saitama Seibu Lions in Japan's Pacific League.
