= Rick Guttormson =

American baseball player (born 1977)

- Starting pitcher
- Born: January 11, 1977 (age 48); Torrance, California, U.S.
- Batted: Right Threw: Right

Professional debut
- NPB: May 22, 2005, for the Yakult Swallows
- KBO: April 9, 2009, for the Kia Tigers

Last appearance
- NPB: September 28, 2008, for the Fukuoka SoftBank Hawks
- KBO: September 25, 2009, for the Kia Tigers

NPB statistics
- Win–loss record: 27–29
- Earned run average: 3.52
- Strikeouts: 329

KBO statistics
- Win–loss record: 13–4
- Earned run average: 3.24
- Strikeouts: 95

Teams
- Yakult Swallows (2005–2006); Fukuoka SoftBank Hawks (2007–2008); Kia Tigers (2009)

Career highlights and awards
- NPB: Pitched a no-hitter on May 25, 2006; KBO: Korean Series champion (2009)

Rick Lee Guttormson (リック・ガトームソン, 릭 구톰슨) (born January 11, 1977) is an American former professional baseball starting pitcher.

He became the first pitcher to throw a no-hitter in the history of interleague play in Japanese baseball, doing so against the Tohoku Rakuten Golden Eagles on May 25, 2006. He was the last foreign pitcher to throw a no hitter in Nippon Professional Baseball (NPB) until 2022, when Cody Ponce of the Hokkaido Nippon-Ham Fighters did so against the Fukuoka SoftBank Hawks on the 27th of August.

On July 13, 2007, he tested positive for finasteride, which was banned by NPB due to its use as a masking agent, and suspended for 20 days.
