= 2008 Japan Series =

Team (Wins)	Managers	Season
Saitama Seibu Lions (4)	Hisanobu Watanabe	76–64–4, (.543), GA: 2.5
Yomiuri Giants (3)	Tatsunori Hara	84–57–3, (.596), GA: 2
- Dates: November 1–9
- MVP: Takayuki Kishi (Saitama)
- FSA: Alex Ramírez (Yomiuri)

Broadcast
- Television: Japan: NTV (Games 1, 6, 7); TV Asahi (Games 2, 3, 4, 5); South Korea: SBS Sports Channel
- TV announcers: Ryo Kawamura, Shunsuke Shimizu, Takao Nakayama

The 2008 Japan Series was the 59th edition of Nippon Professional Baseball's championship series. The best-of-seven playoff between the respective champions of the Central League's and the Pacific League's Climax Series (postseason) began on Saturday, November 1, 2008, and went the full seven games. The deciding Game 7 took place on Sunday, November 9.

== Climax Series ==
First Stage
Central League
2	Hanshin Tigers	1
3	Chunichi Dragons	2
Pacific League
2	Orix Buffaloes	0
3	Hokkaido Nippon-Ham Fighters	2

Second Stage
1	Yomiuri Giants	3
3	Chunichi Dragons	1
1	Saitama Seibu Lions	4
3	Hokkaido Nippon-Ham Fighters	2

Japan Series
CL1	Yomiuri Giants	3
PL1	Saitama Seibu Lions	4

== Summary ==
Saitama Seibu Lions won the series, 4–3.

Game	Date	Score	Location	Time	Attendance
1	November 1	Saitama Seibu Lions – 2, Yomiuri Giants – 1	Tokyo Dome	2:45	44,757
2	November 2	Saitama Seibu Lions – 2, Yomiuri Giants – 3	Tokyo Dome	3:18	44,814
3	November 4	Yomiuri Giants – 6, Saitama Seibu Lions – 4	Seibu Dome	3:14	24,495
4	November 5	Yomiuri Giants – 0, Saitama Seibu Lions – 5	Seibu Dome	2:53	27,930
5	November 7	Yomiuri Giants – 7, Saitama Seibu Lions – 3	Seibu Dome	3:31	28,763
6	November 8	Saitama Seibu Lions – 4, Yomiuri Giants – 1	Tokyo Dome	3:24	44,749
7	November 9	Saitama Seibu Lions – 3, Yomiuri Giants – 2	Tokyo Dome	3:20	44,737

== Game summaries ==
=== Game 1 ===
Saturday, November 1, 2008, 6:15 pm (JST) at Tokyo Dome in Bunkyō, Tokyo
Team	1	2	3	4	5	6	7	8	9	R	H	E
Saitama Seibu	0	0	0	0	1	1	0	0	0	2	6	1
Yomiuri	0	0	0	1	0	0	0	0	0	1	2	0
WP: Hideaki Wakui LP: Koji Uehara Sv: Alex Graman; Home runs: SEI: Taketoshi Gotoh (1), Hiroyuki Nakajima (1); YOM: None; Boxscore

=== Game 2 ===
Sunday, November 2, 2008, 6:17 pm (JST) at Tokyo Dome in Bunkyō, Tokyo
Team	1	2	3	4	5	6	7	8	9	R	H	E
Saitama Seibu	0	0	0	2	0	0	0	0	0	2	3	0
Yomiuri	0	1	0	0	0	1	0	0	1	3	8	0
WP: Daisuke Ochi LP: Shinya Okamoto; Home runs: SEI: Hiroyuki Nakajima (2); YOM: Alex Ramírez (1); Boxscore

=== Game 3 ===
Tuesday, November 4, 2008, 6:18 pm (JST) at Seibu Dome in Tokorozawa, Saitama Prefecture
Team	1	2	3	4	5	6	7	8	9	R	H	E
Yomiuri	1	3	0	0	0	1	0	1	0	6	8	0
Saitama Seibu	0	0	0	0	0	4	0	0	0	4	7	0
WP: Tetsuya Utsumi LP: Kazuhisa Ishii Sv: Marc Kroon; Home runs: YOM: Takahiro Suzuki (1), Alex Ramírez (2), Michihiro Ogasawara (1); SEI: Takeya Nakamura (1); Boxscore

=== Game 4 ===
Wednesday, November 5, 2008, 6:18 pm (JST) at Seibu Dome in Tokorozawa, Saitama Prefecture
Team	1	2	3	4	5	6	7	8	9	R	H	E
Yomiuri	0	0	0	0	0	0	0	0	0	0	4	0
Saitama Seibu	1	0	0	2	0	2	0	0	x	5	7	0
WP: Takayuki Kishi LP: Seth Greisinger; Home runs: YOM: None; SEI: Takeya Nakamura (2, 3); Boxscore

Takayuki Kishi tossed a 147-pitch, complete-game shutout, striking out 10 Giants in the process. His opponent, Seth Greisinger, gave up 5 runs in as many innings, continuing his season-long struggles against the Lions. Tempers flared in the 4th when Greisinger hit Seibu shortstop Hiroyuki Nakajima on the elbow with a pitch. The two started shouting at each other, and the benches cleared. No punches were thrown, but the next batter, Takeya Nakamura, crushed his first home run of the day to extend Seibu's lead to 3-0. Nakamura would strike again in the 6th off Greisinger with another 2-run blast to end the scoring.

=== Game 5 ===
Friday, November 7, 2008, 6:17 pm (JST) at Seibu Dome in Tokorozawa, Saitama Prefecture
Team	1	2	3	4	5	6	7	8	9	R	H	E
Yomiuri	0	1	0	0	0	0	4	0	2	7	10	2
Saitama Seibu	1	0	1	0	0	0	0	0	1	3	13	0
WP: Kentaro Nishimura (1–0) LP: Hideaki Wakui (1–1); Home runs: YOM: Shinnosuke Abe (1); SEI: Hiroshi Hirao (1); Boxscore

=== Game 6 ===
Saturday, November 8, 2008, 6:15 pm (JST) at Tokyo Dome in Bunkyō, Tokyo
Team	1	2	3	4	5	6	7	8	9	R	H	E
Saitama Seibu	3	0	0	0	1	0	0	0	0	4	10	0
Yomiuri	0	1	0	0	0	0	0	0	0	1	10	0
WP: Takayuki Kishi LP: Hisanori Takahashi; Home runs: SEI: Hiroshi Hirao (2); YOM: None; Boxscore

Kishi came through again with 5 2/3 innings of shutout ball in relief of Seibu starter Kazuyuki Hoashi after Hoashi got into trouble in the 4th. The unsung hero of the Series, Hiroshi Hirao, crushed a 3-run home run to give the Lions a 3–0 lead off veteran lefty starter Hisanori Takahashi in the first. Takahashi only lasted 2 innings, giving up 3 runs on 5 hits, walking 2 and striking out 2.

=== Game 7 ===
Sunday, November 9, 2008, 6:16 pm (JST) at Tokyo Dome in Bunkyō, Tokyo
Team	1	2	3	4	5	6	7	8	9	R	H	E
Saitama Seibu	0	0	0	0	1	0	0	2	0	3	6	0
Yomiuri	0	1	1	0	0	0	0	0	0	2	2	0
WP: Tomoki Hoshino LP: Daisuke Ochi Sv: Alex Graman; Home runs: SEI: Hiram Bocachica (1); YOM: Hayato Sakamoto (1); Boxscore

The critical inning was the 8th. Daisuke Ochi came in for the Giants to keep the Lions at bay, but Ochi got off to a bad start by hitting Kataoka. Kataoka then stole second, and he was sacrificed to 3rd. Hiroyuki Nakajima then hit a slow ground ball to 3rd, and Kataoka's speed allowed him to beat the throw home, tying the game up at 2. Ochi then proceeded to walk the next two batters, then Hiroshi Hirao, on a 3-1 pitch, lined a breaking ball back up the middle to score Takeya Nakamura and give Seibu the lead. Alex Graman closed out the Giants in the 9th to give the Lions their first Japan Series Championship since 2004.

== See also ==
- 2008 Korean Series
- 2008 World Series
