= Yutaro Ohsaki =

Japanese baseball player (born 1984)

Yutaro Ohsaki 大﨑 雄太朗
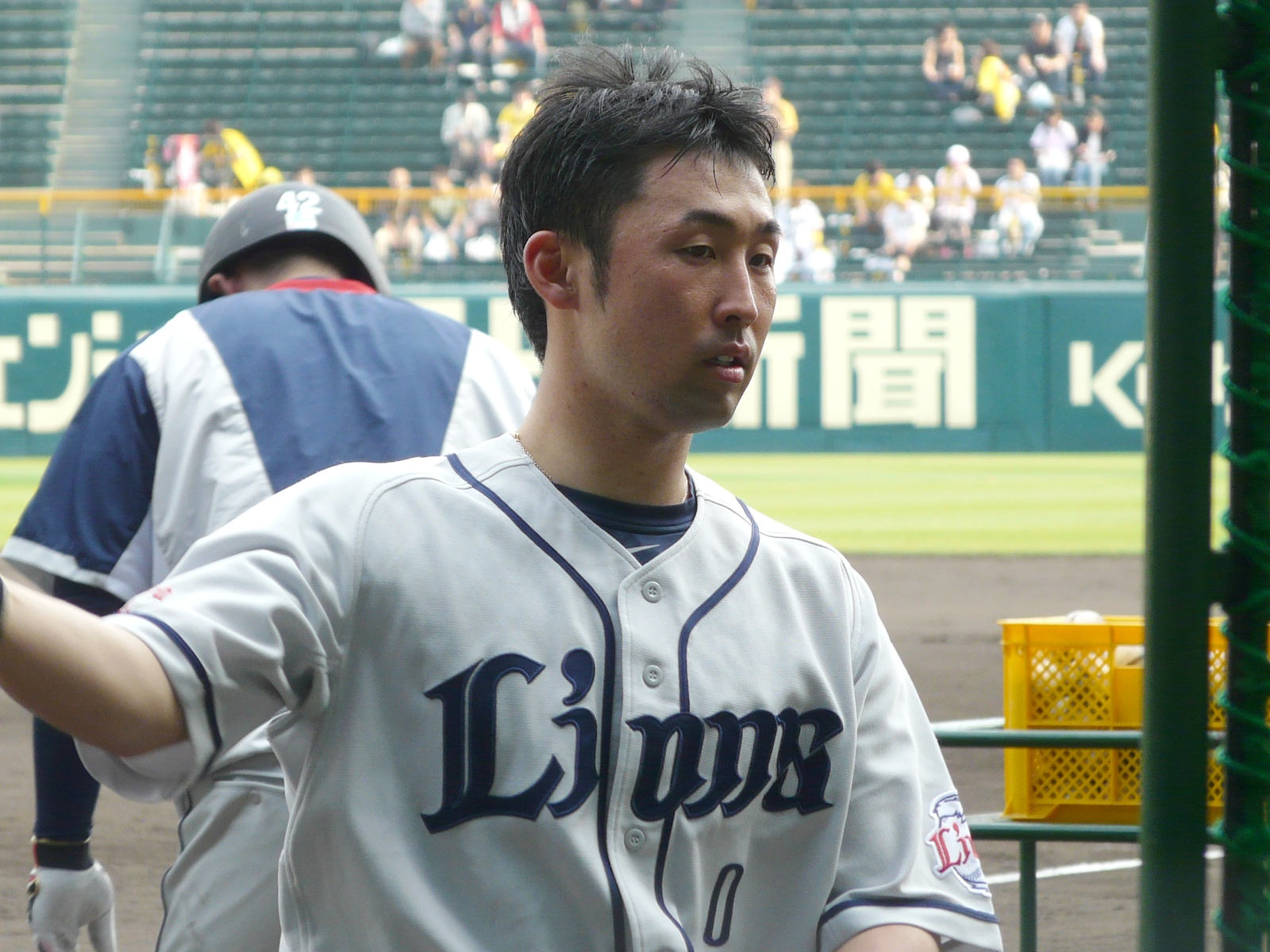
- Ohsaki with the Saitama Seibu Lions
- Outfielder
- Born: October 18, 1984 (age 41); Ibaraki, Japan
- Bats: Left Throws: Right

NPB debut
- 2007, for the Saitama Seibu Lions

NPB statistics (through 2016)
- Batting average: .257
- Home runs: 5
- Runs batted in: 77
- Stats at Baseball Reference

Teams
- Seibu Lions/Saitama Seibu Lions (2007–2017)
- Last updated on: December 21, 2017

Yutaro Ohsaki (大﨑 雄太朗, Ohsaki Yutaro; born October 18, 1984 in Ibaraki, Japan) is a Japanese professional baseball player for the Saitama Seibu Lions in Japan's Nippon Professional Baseball.
