= Kazuyuki Hoashi =

Japanese baseball player

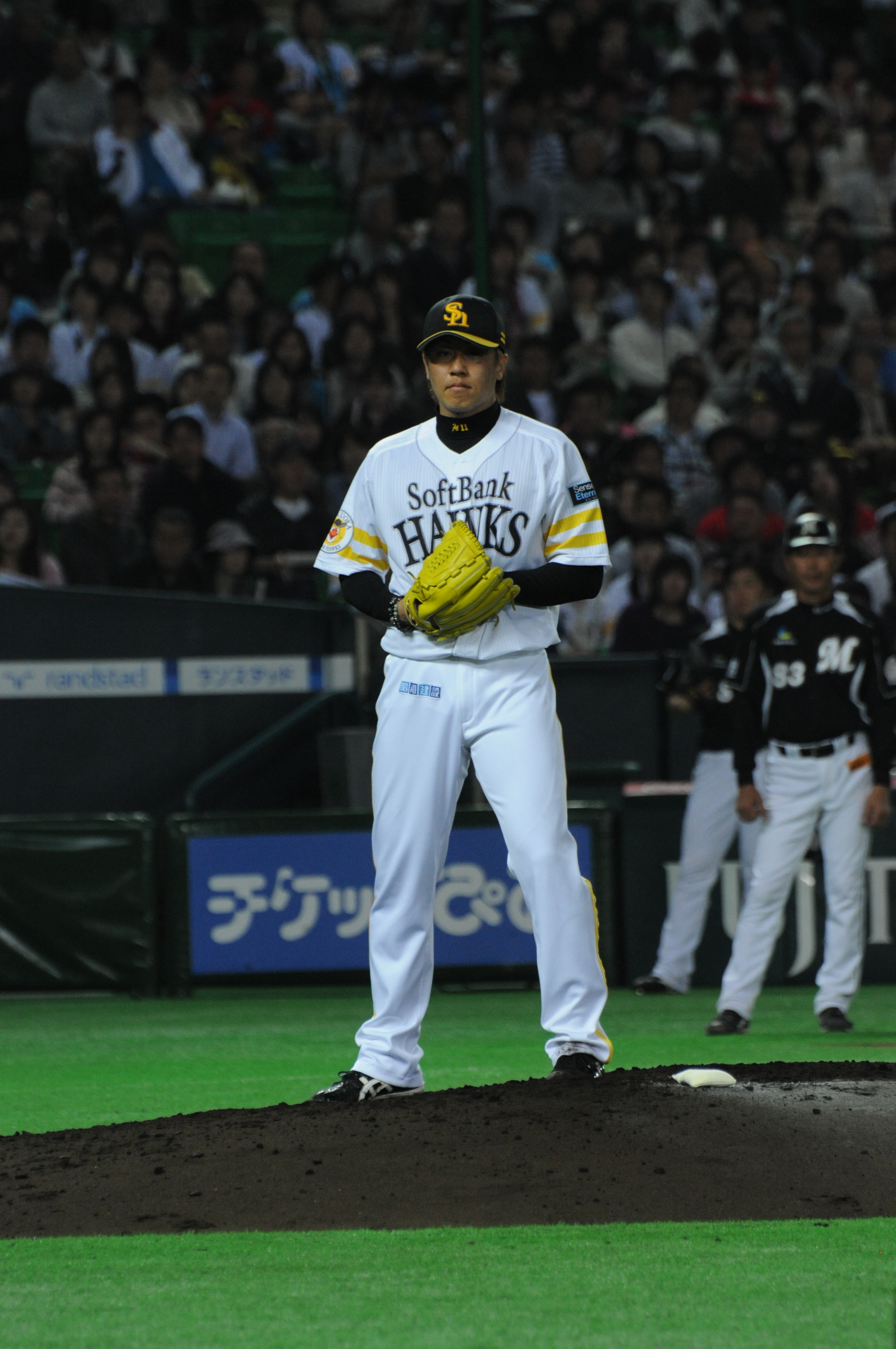
- Hoashi with the Fukuoka SoftBank Hawks
- Pitcher
- Born: July 15, 1979 (age 46); Fukuoka, Japan
- Bats: Left Throws: Left

debut
- March 27, 2001, for the Seibu Lions

Teams
- Seibu Lions/Saitama Seibu Lions (2001–2011); Fukuoka SoftBank Hawks (2012–2015)

Kazuyuki Hoashi (帆足 和幸, Hoashi Kazuyuki; born July 15, 1979) is a Japanese Nippon Professional Baseball pitcher.
