= 2007 Hokkaido Nippon-Ham Fighters season =

2007 Hokkaido Nippon-Ham Fighters
- Pacific League champions
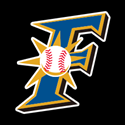
- League: Pacific League
- Ballpark: Sapporo Dome
- Record: 79–60–5 (.568)
- League place: 1st
- Parent company: Nippon Ham
- President: Junichi Fujii
- Manager: Trey Hillman
- Captain: Makoto Kaneko

The 2007 Hokkaido Nippon-Ham Fighters season was the 62nd season for the Hokkaido Nippon-Ham Fighters franchise.

== Regular season ==
=== Standings ===
2007 Pacific League standings
Team	Pld	W	L	T	PCT	GB
Hokkaido Nippon-Ham Fighters	**144**	**79**	**60**	**5**	.566	—
Chiba Lotte Marines	144	76	61	7	.552	2
Fukuoka SoftBank Hawks	144	73	66	5	.524	6
Tohoku Rakuten Golden Eagles	144	67	75	2	.472	13.5
Seibu Lions	144	66	76	2	.465	14.5
Orix Buffaloes	144	62	77	5	.448	17

=== Record vs. opponents ===
**Pacific League**
Chiba Lotte Marines	11–11–2
Fukuoka SoftBank Hawks	9–14–1
Orix Buffaloes	14–10–0
Saitama Seibu Lions	12–11–1
Tohoku Rakuten Golden Eagles	15–9–1
**Central League**
Chunichi Dragons	3–1–0
Hanshin Tigers	4–0–0
Hiroshima Toyo Carp	4–0–0
Tokyo Yakult Swallows	3–1–0
Yokohama BayStars	1–2–1
Yomiuri Giants	3–1–0
Interleague total	18–5–1
**Total**	**79–60–5**

=== Game log ===
Legend
	Fighters win
	Fighters loss
	Fighters tie
	Postponement
**Bold**	Fighters team member

2008 Game Log
March

#	Date	Opponent	Score	Win	Loss	Save	Attendance	Record
1	March 24	@ Marines	4–4 (7)	Game tied after 6 innings			30,062	0–0–1
2	March 25	@ Marines	0–0 (12)	Game tied after 12 innings			22,114	0–0–2
3	March 27	@ Buffaloes	2–5	Davey (1–0)	**Kanemura** (0–1)	Carter (1)	12,055	0–1–2
4	March 28	@ Buffaloes	3–2	**Yagi** (1–0)	Hirano (0–1)	**Nakamura** (1)	8,245	1–1–2

=== Roster ===
2008 Hokkaido Nippon-Ham Fighters
**Roster**
**Pitchers**: 11 Yu Darvish; 27 Shintaro Ejiri; 14 Ryan Glynn; 19 Jun Hagiwara; 33 Yoshitaka Hashimoto; 60 Takeshi Ito; 59 Takayuki Kanamori; 28 Takehito Kanazawa; 16 Satoru Kanemura; 12/51 Tatsuo Kato; 47 Kazumasa Kikuchi; 35 Tatsuo Kinoshita; 36 Micheal Nakamura; 61 Takehiko Oshimoto; 13 Hideki Sunaga; 42 Brian Sweeney; 21 Hisashi Takeda; 38 Masaru Takeda; 22 Yoshinori Tateyama; 29 Tomoya Yagi; 44 Kazunori Yamamoto; 34 Mitsuo Yoshikawa	**Catchers**: 32 Satoshi Nakajima; 30 Shinji Takahashi; 64 Shinya Tsuruoka; **Infielders**: 4 Andy Green; 57 Yuji Iiyama; 54 Naoto Inada; 15 Mitch Jones; 8 Makoto Kaneko; 10 Kuniyuki Kimoto; 31 Eiichi Koyano; 9 Tomoyuki Oda; 5 Fernando Seguignol; 58 Takayuki Takaguchi; 3 Kensuke Tanaka; 6 Yukio Tanaka; 24 Yang Dai-Kang	**Outfielders**: 41 Atsunori Inaba; 26 Yoshio Itoi; 40 Yohei Kaneko; 39 Keizo Kawashima; 52 Toshimasa Konta; 53 Takahito Kudo; 1 Hichori Morimoto; 7 Tomochika Tsuboi	**Manager**: 88 Trey Hillman

== Postseason ==
=== Climax Series ===
==== Stage 2 ====
Game 1

Team	1	2	3	4	5	6	7	8	9	R	H	E
Lotte	0	1	1	0	0	0	0	0	0	2	5	0
Nippon-Ham	0	4	0	0	1	0	0	0	X	5	13	0
WP: Yu Darvish (1–0) LP: Yasutomo Kubo (0–1)

Game 2

Team	1	2	3	4	5	6	7	8	9	R	H	E
Lotte	0	4	0	0	1	0	0	1	2	8	13	1
Nippon-Ham	1	0	0	0	0	0	0	0	0	1	4	0
WP: Koji Takagi (1–0) LP: Masaru Takeda (0–1); Home runs: LOT: Tomoya Satozaki (2), José Ortiz (1), Saburo Ohmura (1), Daisuke Hayakawa (1); NIP: None

Game 3

Team	1	2	3	4	5	6	7	8	9	R	H	E
Lotte	0	0	0	0	0	0	0	0	0	0	6	0
Nippon-Ham	0	0	0	1	0	0	6	0	X	7	13	0
WP: Ryan Glynn (1–0) LP: Shunsuke Watanabe (0–1)

Game 4

Team	1	2	3	4	5	6	7	8	9	R	H	E
Lotte	0	0	0	0	0	2	0	0	3	5	14	0
Nippon-Ham	0	0	0	0	1	0	0	0	0	1	11	0
WP: Yusuke Kawasaki (1–0) LP: Masaru Takeda (0–2); Home runs: LOT: Tomoya Satozaki (3); NIP: None

Game 5

Team	1	2	3	4	5	6	7	8	9	R	H	E
Lotte	0	0	0	0	0	1	0	0	1	2	8	0
Nippon-Ham	0	0	3	1	2	0	0	0	X	6	11	0
WP: Yu Darvish (2–0) LP: Yoshihisa Naruse (0–1); Home runs: LOT: None; NIP: Fernando Seguignol (1)

=== Japan Series ===
==== Game 1 ====
Team	1	2	3	4	5	6	7	8	9	R	H	E
Chunichi	0	0	0	0	0	1	0	0	0	1	4	0
Nippon-Ham	3	0	0	0	0	0	0	0	0	3	2	0
WP: Yu Darvish (1–0) LP: Kenshin Kawakami (0–1); Home runs: CHU: None; NIP: Fernando Seguignol (1)

==== Game 2 ====
Team	1	2	3	4	5	6	7	8	9	R	H	E
Chunichi	1	0	0	3	0	2	2	0	0	8	8	0
Nippon-Ham	0	0	0	1	0	0	0	0	0	1	4	0
WP: Kenichi Nakata (1–0) LP: Ryan Glynn (0–1); Home runs: CHU: Lee Byung-Kyu (1), Masahiko Morino (1); NIP: Fernando Seguignol (2)

==== Game 3 ====
Team	1	2	3	4	5	6	7	8	9	R	H	E
Nippon-Ham	0	1	0	0	0	0	0	0	0	1	9	0
Chunichi	7	2	0	0	0	0	0	0	X	9	12	0
WP: Kenta Asakura (1–0) LP: Masaru Takeda (0–1)

==== Game 4 ====
Team	1	2	3	4	5	6	7	8	9	R	H	E
Nippon-Ham	0	0	0	1	1	0	0	0	0	2	7	1
Chunichi	2	0	0	0	1	0	1	0	X	4	5	1
WP: Yoshihiro Suzuki (1–0) LP: Mitsuo Yoshikawa (0–1) Sv: Hitoki Iwase (1)

==== Game 5 ====
Team	1	2	3	4	5	6	7	8	9	R	H	E
Nippon-Ham	0	0	0	0	0	0	0	0	0	0	0	0
Chunichi	0	1	0	0	0	0	0	0	X	1	5	0
WP: Daisuke Yamai (1–0) LP: Yu Darvish (1–1) Sv: Hitoki Iwase (2)

== Player statistics ==
=== Batting ===
Player	G	AB	R	H	2B	3B	HR	RBI	AVG	SB
Yu Darvish	26	8	0	0	0	0	0	0	.000	0
Shintaro Ejiri	42	1	0	0	0	0	0	0	.000	0
Ryan Glynn	24	7	0	0	0	0	0	0	.000	0
Andy Green	18	61	2	12	5	0	0	3	.197	0
Yuji Iiyama	105	49	16	15	3	0	0	7	.306	3
Atsunori Inaba	137	527	61	176	39	0	17	87	.334	6
Naoto Inada	83	160	15	44	2	1	0	14	.275	0
Yoshio Itoi	7	11	1	1	0	0	0	0	.091	1
Mitch Jones	30	94	3	15	6	1	1	7	.160	1
Makoto Kaneko	132	419	34	102	15	4	4	53	.243	9
Yohei Kaneko	33	62	4	8	2	0	3	10	.129	1
Keizo Kawashima	10	18	2	4	1	0	0	0	.222	1
Kuniyuki Kimoto	18	35	2	3	0	0	0	1	.086	0
Tatsuo Kinoshita	5	1	0	0	0	0	0	0	.000	0
Toshimasa Konta	94	57	14	14	2	1	0	5	.246	7
Eiichi Koyano	113	364	39	92	12	1	5	37	.253	5
Takahito Kudo	72	215	23	62	6	4	0	17	.288	9
Hichori Morimoto	144	584	91	175	27	3	3	44	.300	31
Satoshi Nakajima	60	15	1	1	0	0	1	3	.067	0
Tomoyuki Oda	34	73	3	12	4	0	0	3	.164	0
Takehiko Oshimoto	36	1	0	0	0	0	0	0	.000	0
Fernando Seguignol	134	470	50	117	21	0	21	68	.249	0
Takayuki Takaguchi	3	7	0	0	0	0	0	0	.000	0
Shinji Takahashi	112	385	38	98	23	0	10	43	.255	2
Hisashi Takeda	64	1	0	0	0	0	0	0	.000	0
Masaru Takeda	35	10	0	1	0	0	0	0	.100	0
Kensuke Tanaka	144	526	66	134	24	7	3	31	.255	27
Yukio Tanaka	65	135	16	30	4	0	5	19	.222	0
Tomochika Tsuboi	100	276	26	78	7	2	0	23	.283	6
Shinya Tsuruoka	57	133	7	27	2	1	0	13	.203	0
Yang Dai-Kang	55	109	12	26	8	2	0	10	.239	3
Mitsuo Yoshikawa	20	6	0	0	0	0	0	0	.000	0

Indicates PL leader in the category

=== Pitching ===
Player	W	L	ERA	G	Win%	SV	IP	R	ER	BB	K
Yu Darvish	15	5	1.82	26	.750	0	207 2/3	48	42	49	210
Shintaro Ejiri	7	4	3.33	42	.636	1	48 2/3	21	18	10	38
Ryan Glynn	9	8	2.21	24	.529	0	155	43	38	33	111
Jun Hagiwara	1	0	5.63	5	1.000	0	8	5	5	4	5
Yoshitaka Hashimoto	0	0	3.38	5	.000	0	8	3	3	3	4
Takeshi Ito	0	0	6.60	11	.000	0	15	11	11	3	8
Takayuki Kanamori	4	1	2.35	15	.800	0	23	6	6	3	9
Takehito Kanazawa	1	1	8.46	10	.500	0	22 1/3	21	21	12	9
Satoru Kanemura	5	6	4.73	13	.455	0	78	44	41	30	33
Tatsuo Kato	0	0	1.86	11	.000	0	9 2/3	2	2	3	6
Kazumasa Kikuchi	0	0	0.00	1	.000	0	2	0	0	1	3
Tatsuo Kinoshita	2	1	2.40	5	.667	0	30	8	8	7	11
Micheal Nakamura	1	1	2.16	56	.500	34	58 1/3	15	14	14	49
Takehiko Oshimoto	2	1	4.60	36	.667	0	47	25	24	23	49
Hideki Sunaga	0	0	54.00	3	.000	0	1 1/3	8	8	2	0
Brian Sweeney	6	8	3.70	21	.429	0	109 1/3	47	45	36	56
Hisashi Takeda	7	6	2.42	64	.538	2	74 1/3	20	20	16	53
Masaru Takeda	9	4	2.54	35	.692	0	149	42	42	17	101
Yoshinori Tateyama	2	4	4.17	7	.333	0	41	20	19	9	31
Tomoya Yagi	4	6	4.54	15	.400	0	85 1/3	45	43	20	36
Kazunori Yamamoto	0	1	6.75	12	.000	0	21 1/3	16	16	12	15
Mitsuo Yoshikawa	4	3	3.66	19	.571	0	93 1/3	39	38	46	52

Indicates PL leader in the category
