= List of Nippon Professional Baseball players (K) =

The following is a list of Nippon Professional Baseball players with the last name starting with K, retired or active.

== K ==
Name	Debut	Final Game	Position	Teams	Ref
Ken Kadokura			Starting Pitcher	Chunichi Dragons, Yokohama BayStars, Osaka Kintetsu Buffaloes, Yomiuri Giants, SK Wyverns, Samsung Lions	
Hiromitsu Kadota			Outfielder		
Takuma Kadowaki					
Masaru Kageura					
Masahito Kai					
Masahide Kaizuka					
Kazutaka Kajihara					
Ryuichi Kajimae			Outfielder	Yomiuri Giants	
Takao Kajimoto	1954	1973	Pitcher	Hankyu Braves, Orix BlueWave, Chunichi Dragons	
Tatsuya Kajimoto					
Yusuke Kajimoto					
Takayuki Kajitani					
Koji Kajiwara					
Masayuki Kakefu					
Yujiro Kakei					
Tetsuya Kakiuchi					
Genji Kaku					
Taigen Kaku					
Katsuya Kakunaka					
Tateo Kakuri					
Masaya Kakuzen					
Yuya Kamada					
Ken Kamakura					
Masaaki Kamanaka					
Keiji Kamata					
Yoshiyuki Kamei					
Tsutomu Kameyama					
Taichiro Kamisaka					
Takashi Kamishima					
Yasushi Kamiuchi					
Takashi Kamoshida					
Eiji Kanamori					
Hisatomo Kanamori					
Takahiro Kanamori					
Takayuki Kanamori					
Takeshi Kanaya					
Takehito Kanazawa					
Takeshi Kanazawa					
Tsugio Kanazawa					
Daisuke Kanda					
Yoshihide Kanda					
Masahiko Kaneda					
Masaichi Kaneda					
Masayasu Kaneda					
Akihito Kaneishi					
Naoki Kanekawa					
Chihiro Kaneko					
Keisuke Kaneko					
Makoto Kaneko					
Seiichi Kaneko					
Takahiro Kaneko					
Yohei Kaneko					
Akihiro Kanemoto					
Tomoaki Kanemoto					
Daiyu Kanemura					
Kohei Kanemura					
Satoru Kanemura					
Yoshiaki Kanemura					
Norihito Kaneto					
Keisuke Kanoh					
Gabe Kapler					
Yuki Karakawa					
Hisanori Karita					
Eiichi Kasahara					
Minoru Kasai					
Toshihiro Kase					
Satoshi Kashibuchi					
Tadashi Kashima					
Takashi Kashiwada					
Shinsuke Kasuga					
Atsushi Kataoka					
Yasuyuki Kataoka					
Kiyotoshi Katase					
Daiki Katayama					
Fumio Katayama					
Hiroshi Katayama					
Akihiko Katoh					
Daisuke Katoh					
Hiroto Katoh					
Hisayuki Katoh					
Ken Katoh					
Kosuke Katoh					
Masato Katoh					
Mikinori Katoh					
Mitsunori Katoh					
Noriyuki Katoh					
Ryota Katoh					
Shinichi Katoh					
Takayuki Katoh					
Takeharu Katoh					
Tatsuhito Katoh					
Tatsuo Katoh					
Yoshitaka Katori					
Ryota Katsuki					
Ikuro Katsuragi					
Keisuke Kattoh					
Kazuaki Kawabata					
Ryu Kawabata					
Shingo Kawabata					
Yasuhiro Kawabata					
Yuichi Kawabata					
Tadayoshi Kawabe					
Yusuke Kawada					
Tsuyoshi Kawagishi					
Hidetaka Kawagoe					
Toru Kawagoe					
Kazuhisa Kawaguchi					
Kenshi Kawaguchi					
Tomoya Kawaguchi					
Yosuke Kawaguchi					
Junichi Kawahara					
Ryuichi Kawahara					
Masahiro Kawai					
Susumu Kawai					
Takashi Kawai					
Tetsuro Kawajiri					
Kenshin Kawakami					
Tetsuharu Kawakami					
Hiroaki Kawamata					
Yonetoshi Kawamata					
Daisuke Kawamoto					
Ryohei Kawamoto					
Yasuyuki Kawamoto					
Takeo Kawamura					
Shinichi Kawana					
Mototsugu Kawanaka					
Masato Kawano					
Ryo Kawano					
Kenjiro Kawasaki					
Munenori Kawasaki					
Tokuji Kawasaki					
Yasuo Kawasaki					
Yoshifumi Kawasaki					
Yusuke Kawasaki					
Keizoh Kawashima					
Ryo Kawashima					
Hisashi Kawata					
Takaya Kawauchi					
Masahiro Kawazoe					
Hideto Kawazu					
Daisuke Kayajima					
Naoyuki Kazaoka					
Alejandro Kesada					
Go Kida					
Masao Kida					
Shouichi Kida					
Akinari Kidachi					
Katsuhiko Kido					
Ryuma Kidokoro					
Takuya Kikoh					
Kazumasa Kikuchi					
Masanori Kikuchi					
Toshio Kikuchi					
Yasunori Kikuchi					
Tsuyoshi Kikuchihara					
Kuniyuki Kimoto					
Fumikazu Kimura					
Keiji Kimura					
Koichiro Kimura					
Masahiro Kimura					
Ryuji Kimura					
Shigeru Kimura					
Shogo Kimura					
Shota Kimura					
Takuya Kimura					
Suzunosuke Kinjoh					
Tatsuhiko Kinjoh					
Mike Kinkade					
Matt Kinney					
Fuminobu Kinoshita					
Tatsuo Kinoshita					
Sachio Kinugasa					
Atsushi Kinugawa					
Yukio Kinugawa					
Toshinori Kira					
Hiroshi Kisanuki					
Ichiro Kishi					
Takayuki Kishi					
Mamoru Kishida					
Katsuya Kishikawa					
Takatoshi Kishikawa					
Yuji Kishikawa					
Hideki Kishimoto					
Atsushi Kita					
Takashi Kita					
Hirotoshi Kitagawa					
Susumu Kitagawa					
Tetsuya Kitagawa					
Tomonori Kitagawa					
Toshiyuki Kitagawa					
Taiji Kitahara					
Shoji Kitamura					
Shunsuke Kitamura					
Hisashi Kitani					
Katsunori Kitano					
Yoshiharu Kitano					
Makoto Kitoh					
Seiichi Kitoh					
Daiki Kiyohara					
Kazuhiro Kiyohara					
Yuichi Kiyohara					
Eiji Kiyokawa					
Atsushi Kizuka					
Brandon Knight					
Takeshi Koba					
Tadayoshi Kobashi					
Koji Kobayakawa					
Takehiko Kobayakawa					
Akinori Kobayashi					
Atsushi Kobayashi					
Futoshi Kobayashi					
Hiroshi Kobayashi					
Hiroyuki Kobayashi					
Kanei Kobayashi					
Kenji Kobayashi					
Masahide Kobayashi					
Masato Kobayashi					
Noriyuki Kobayashi					
Ryokan Kobayashi					
Satoshi Kobayashi					
Shigeru Kobayashi					
Takumi Kobe					
Akitoshi Kodama					
Shinji Koh					
Shigeyori Koharazawa					
Isao Kohda					
Masahito Kohiyama					
Yoshikazu Kohmura					
Hirofumi Kohno					
Yuki Kohno					
Kazuyoshi Kohyama					
Hideo Koike					
Masaaki Koike					
Takuichi Koike					
Kiyotaka Koishizawa					
Daisaku Kojima					
Hiromu Kojima					
Keiichi Kojima					
Masaya Kojima					
Shinjiro Kojima					
Tatsuya Kojima					
Yoshihiro Kojima					
Hiroki Kokubo					
Tetsuya Kokubo					
Norihiro Komada					
Teppei Komai					
Yuichi Komaki					
Satoshi Komatsu					
Satoru Komiyama					
Shinji Komiyama					
Takanori Komori					
Tetsuya Komori					
Akihito Kondoh					
Kazuki Kondoh					
Sadao Kondoh					
Yoshihisa Kondoh					
Hiroki Kongoh					
Tokuro Konishi					
Toshimasa Konta					
Dae-Sung Koo					
John Koronka					
Yusuke Kosai					
Makoto Kosaka					
Masahiro Kouda					
Masaaki Koyama					
Shinichiro Koyama					
Yoshio Koyama					
Eiichi Koyano					
Ben Kozlowski					
Makoto Kozuru					
Marc Kroon					
Jeff Kubenka					
Atsuhiro Kubo					
Mitsuhiro Kubo					
Yasuo Kubo					
Yasutomo Kubo					
Yuuya Kubo					
Atsushi Kubota					
Satoshi Kubota					
Tomoyuki Kubota					
Kimiyasu Kudoh					
Takahito Kudo					
Teruyoshi Kuji					
Toru Kumazawa					
Yuki Kume					
Gohta Kuniki					
Yoshikazu Kura					
Hidenori Kuramoto					
Shinya Kuramoto					
Shinji Kurano					
Shigenori Kuremoto					
Kenta Kurihara					
Yusuke Kurita					
Satoshi Kuriyama					
Takumi Kuriyama					
Toshiki Kurobane					
Hiroki Kuroda					
Kazuhiro Kuroda					
Satoshi Kuroda					
Yusuke Kuroda					
Junji Kuroki					
Tomohiro Kuroki					
Haruki Kurose					
Masato Kurotaki					
Daisuke Kusano					
Kentaro Kuwahara					
Yoshiyuki Kuwahara					
Masumi Kuwata					
