= Matsuzaka Generation =

The Matsuzaka Generation (松坂世代, Matsuzaka Sedai) is a term used to collectively describe the (usually Japanese) baseball players that belong to former Chunichi Dragons and Saitama Seibu Lions starting pitcher Daisuke Matsuzaka's age group. As per Japanese laws on how children are to be divided into grade levels, this term refers to players born between April 2, 1980, and April 1, 1981.

The term was coined by the Japanese media as the age group that came to be known as one of the deepest and most talented in Nippon Professional Baseball (NPB) history.

== Background ==
=== Precursor ===
In 1980, then-Waseda Jitsugyo High School pitcher Daisuke Araki rose to national stardom for his sensational performance in the 62nd National High School Baseball Championship despite being in only his first year of high school. Araki went on to pitch in five consecutive national tournaments (spring and summer), including the National High School Baseball Invitational Tournament. His popularity, particularly among women, became such a cultural phenomenon that studies showed that Daisuke (with the kanji "大輔") was the most popular name given to male newborn infants in Japan from 1979 to 1986.

Four of the players belonging to the Matsuzaka Generation (namely, Daisuke Matsuzaka, Orix Buffaloes pitcher Daisuke Katoh and former Chunichi Dragons pitchers Daisuke Sakai and Daisuke Ue) were given this name and Kanji.

=== Origin ===
Although the year 1998 is often associated with Matsuzaka's stellar performance as the ace pitcher for Yokohama Senior High School in the 80th National High School Baseball Championship, it was also the final year of high school for many players who would go on to play in the NPB. Some went on to the pros immediately after high school, while others did so after playing in college or the industrial leagues.

The media coined the term "Matsuzaka Generation" to describe those born between 2 April 1980 and 1 April 1981 for a number of reasons; namely, that an exceedingly high number of players who played in the 80th National High School Baseball Tournament succeeded at the professional level; that many who went on to play at some of the highest levels of Japanese college baseball like the Tokyo Big6 and Tohto University leagues became ace pitchers for their teams as freshmen and sophomores; and that many prominent Japanese athletes as well as celebrities were born during this span as well. (It can also be said, in turn, that Matsuzaka was able to enjoy an exceptional career in the pros despite being surrounded by such a concentration of talent.) The name is thus not attributed to any particular team or organization and is said to have occurred naturally.

While other age groups seen to consist of many talented players have since been given similar names—those born between 2 April 1988 and 1 April 1989 are sometimes referred to as the Handkerchief Generation (ハンカチ世代, Hankachi Sedai) or Saito Generation (斎藤世代, Saitō Sedai) in reference to Waseda University pitcher Yuki Saito or, alternatively, the Tanaka Generation (田中世代, Tanaka Sedai) in reference to New York Yankees pitcher Masahiro Tanaka—Matsuzaka's age group was the first to be given the name "世代", meaning "generation". No single age group has produced players who have collectively succeeded at the professional level to the extent Matsuzaka's has.

==== MBS Documentary ====
On March 3, 2003, major Japanese television network Mainichi Broadcasting System ran a special feature titled "Matsuzaka Generation – Spring, For Each of the 22-Year-Olds" (using the "ジェネレーション", the literal katakana syllabary for "Generation", instead of the Japanese word "世代", or sedai) on its popular documentary television series Jounetsu Tairiku. It covered the lives of various players who belonged to the group, some who had gone on to the pros (Nagisa Arakaki), some who still hoped to be drafted (Katsumi Higaki) and some who had decided to pursue other careers altogether (Satoshi Kamishige), nearly five years after the now-legendary 80th National High School Baseball Championship.

=== Criticism ===
The term "Matsuzaka Generation" is often used to describe players belonging to this age group more so for its sheer simplicity rather than to recognize the accomplishments of Matsuzaka himself. Despite this, players' reactions to this name being used have been mixed: the Yomiuri Giants organization is famous for rejecting the name altogether and announcing, "Please refer to the players that belong to the Matsuzaka Generation on our team as the '80's' (Eighties)." Hanshin Tigers pitcher Tomoyuki Kubota once remarked, "It makes it sound like Matsuzaka is the only one who makes this group relevant. The only thing we have in common is that we're the same age." Likewise, Fukuoka SoftBank Hawks pitcher Nagisa Arakaki has said, "Someday I'll make them call it the 'Arakaki Generation'". The Yokohama BayStars once referred to the age group as the "Koike Generation" for then-BayStars outfielder Masaaki Koike (now with the Chunichi Dragons) within the team.

=== "The Last Star" ===
While all of the players belonging to the group were naturally born within a one-year span, they entered the pros in different years depending on how many years they had spent in college, the industrial and/or the independent leagues (if at all). As the term "Matsuzaka Generation" became more commonplace, the media began to refer to a player who was drafted into the NPB in later years because he had enjoyed an established career at the amateur level prior to going pro as The Last Star of the Matsuzaka Generation (松坂世代最後の大物, Matsuzaka Sedai Saigo no Ōmono).

There is no record of any member of this group who went pro straight after high school or spent four years in college (and was thus drafted in 2003) ever being referred to as "The Last Star". The first player known to have been called by this name is Yasutomo Kubo, who spent six years in the industrial leagues before being drafted in 2005 despite being a well-known draft prospect since high school who once led his team to the finals of the 80th National High School Baseball Championship (losing to Yokohama Senior High).

Shortstop Eishin Soyogi was also referred to as "The Last Star of the Matsuzaka Generation" when he played well in his rookie season with the Hiroshima Carp in 2006, though the title failed to catch on. (The name has only been used for players with established track records at the amateur level, explaining why players like shortstop Naoto Watanabe were not called "The Last Star" when they were drafted in 2007.)

In 2007, Triple-A Sacramento pitcher Kazuhito Tadano was again referred to as "The Last Star of the Matsuzaka Generation" upon being drafted, though his situation differed in that he was not a true "rookie", having played for the major league team Cleveland Indians from 2004 to 2005. (His situation was complicated due to an appearance in a gay porn film that caused NPB teams to blackball him, forcing him to play in the United States.)

The last actual player belonging to this age group to go pro is shortstop/third baseman Jobu Morita, who played for Mitsubishi Motors Okazaki of the Japanese industrial leagues, the Elmira Pioneers of the New York Collegiate Baseball League, and the Kagawa Olive Guyners of the independent Shikoku-Kyushu Island League before being drafted by the Golden Eagles in 2008.

=== Major League Baseball players ===
The term is typically only used in reference to Japanese players, but the Japanese media has, at times, referred to other (non-Japanese) major leaguers born during the aforementioned span as belonging to the "Matsuzaka Generation", most notably former Red Sox pitchers Josh Beckett and Jonathan Papelbon. Many other established major leaguers belong to this age group, including C.C. Sabathia, Dan Haren, Curtis Granderson, Brett Myers, Shane Victorino, Alex Ríos, Hank Blalock, Nick Swisher and Mark Prior.

== Players ==
A total of 94 players belonging to the Matsuzaka Generation have been on one of the twelve professional baseball teams' rosters.

Additionally, Matsuzaka and Kazuhito Tadano have played for teams in Major League Baseball.

Below is a partial list of said players. It includes only those for which English Wikipedia pages exist (as of October 9, 2010).

=== Nippon Professional Baseball ===
==== Central League ====
- Hanshin Tigers
  - Kyuji Fujikawa - retired as of 2020
  - Tomoyuki Kubota - retired as of 2014
- Hiroshima Toyo Carp
  - Hirotaka Egusa - retired as of 2017
  - Akihiro Higashide - retired as of 2015, currently Hiroshima batting coach
  - Katsuhiro Nagakawa - retired as of 2019, currently Hiroshima pitching coach
  - Eishin Soyogi - retired as of 2017, currently Orix coach
- Yomiuri Giants
  - Ken Katoh - retired as of 2016, currently Yomiuri battery coach
  - Shuichi Murata - retired as of 2018, currently Yomiuri batting coach
  - Toshiya Sugiuchi - retired as of 2018, currently Yomiuri pitching coach
- Yokohama DeNA BayStars
  - Taketoshi Gotoh - retired as of 2018, currently Rakuten batting coach
  - Yasutomo Kubo - retired as of 2017, currently playing at Atlantic League
  - Shuichiro Osada - retired as of 2016
- Tokyo Yakult Swallows
  - Nagisa Arakaki - retired as of 2016
  - Chikara Onodera - retired as of 2012, currently Yakult pitching coach
  - Shohei Tateyama - retired as of 2019, currently Rakuten pitching coach
- Chunichi Dragons
  - Yudai Kawai - retired as of 2016
  - Masato Kobayashi - retired as of 2014
  - Takahito Kudo - retired as of 2018, currently Chunichi outfield and base-running coach

==== Pacific League ====
- Chiba Lotte Marines
  - Ryotaro Doi - retired as of 2007
  - Kentaro Hashimoto - retired as of 2012
- Fukuoka SoftBank Hawks
  - Shinsuke Ogura - retired as of 2012
  - Tsuyoshi Wada - retired as of 2024
- Hokkaido Nippon-Ham Fighters
  - Hiroshi Kisanuki - retired as of 2015, currently Yomiuri pitching coach
  - Toshimasa Konta - retired as of 2012, currently Nippon-Ham outfield and base-running coach
  - Kazuhito Tadano - retired as of 2014
  - Kenji Yano - retired as of 2018, currently Nippon-Ham outfield and batting coach
  - Kazunari Sanematsu - retired as of 2019, currently Yomiuri battery coach
- Orix Buffaloes
  - Shogo Akada - retired as of 2014, currently Seibu batting coach
  - Eiichi Koyano - retired as of 2018, currently Orix batting coach
- Saitama Seibu Lions
  - Matsuzaka Daisuke - retired as of 2021
  - Hichori Morimoto - retired as of 2015
  - Naotaka Takehara - retired as of 2016
  - Tatsuyuki Uemoto - retired as of 2017, currently Seibu battery coach
  - Shogo Kimura - retired as of 2018, currently playing cricket
- Tohoku Rakuten Golden Eagles
  - Yosuke Hiraishi - retired as of 2011, currently SoftBank batting coach
  - Daisuke Kato - retired as of 2013
  - Yuya Kubo - retired as of 2020
  - Jobu Morita - retired as of 2011
  - Toshiya Nakashima - retired as of 2014
  - Keiji Oyama - retired as of 2015
  - Naoto Watanabe - retired as of 2020
  - Koji Yamasaki - retired as of 2015

== Other figures ==
Japanese media have sometimes applied the appellation of Matsuzaka Generation to other athletes and celebrities born in the same time span who played in high school or college competition with other members of the Matsuzaka Generation cohort, even if they did not eventually become professional baseball players themselves.

Below is a partial list of such figures.

- Daiki Tanaka, sportscaster and journalist
- Satoshi Kamishige, sportscaster and television host
- Daisuke Sekimoto, professional wrestler
