= Kyuji Fujikawa =

Japanese baseball player (born 1980)

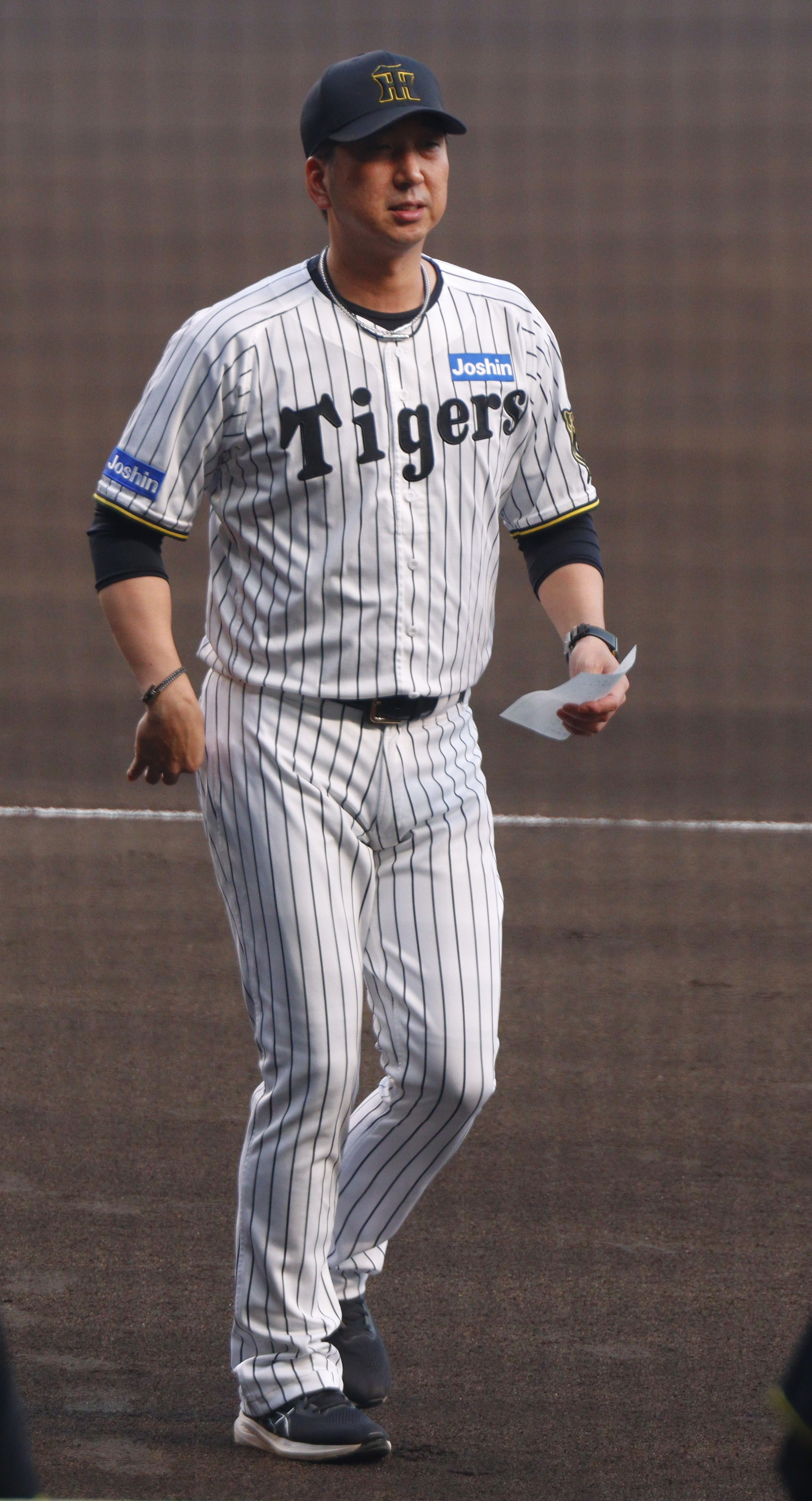
- Fujikawa as manager in Hanshin Tigers, at Hanshin Koshien Stadium

Hanshin Tigers – No. 22
- Pitcher/Manager
- Born: July 21, 1980 (age 46); Kōchi, Kōchi, Japan
- Batted: Left Threw: Right

Professional debut
- NPB: March 31, 2000, for the Hanshin Tigers
- MLB: April 1, 2013, for the Chicago Cubs

Last appearance
- MLB: May 14, 2015, for the Texas Rangers
- NPB: November 10, 2020, for the Hanshin Tigers

NPB statistics
- Win–loss record: 60–38
- Earned run average: 2.08
- Strikeouts: 1,220
- Saves: 243
- Holds: 163

MLB statistics
- Win–loss record: 1–1
- Earned run average: 5.74
- Strikeouts: 32
- Saves: 2
- Holds: 1
- Stats at Baseball Reference

Teams
- As player: Hanshin Tigers (2000–2012); Chicago Cubs (2013–2014); Texas Rangers (2015); Hanshin Tigers (2016–2020); As manager: Hanshin Tigers (2025–present)

Career highlights and awards
- 2× Central League Save Leader (2007, 2011); 2× Central League Most Valuable Setup Pitcher (2005–2006); Most Valuable Battery (2005); Most Valuable Battery Special Award (2008); 5× NPB All-Star (2005–2008, 2019); Central League Manager of the Year (2025)
Medals
Men's baseball
Representing Japan
World Baseball Classic
Gold medal – first place	2006 San Diego	Team
Gold medal – first place	2009 Los Angeles	Team
Asian Baseball Championship
Gold medal – first place	2007 Taichung	Team

Kyuji Fujikawa (藤川 球児, Fujikawa Kyūji; born July 21, 1980) is a Japanese former professional baseball relief pitcher who currently serves as the manager for the Hanshin Tigers of Nippon Professional Baseball (NPB). He played in NPB for the Hanshin Tigers from 2000 to 2012 and 2016 to 2020, and in Major League Baseball (MLB) for the Chicago Cubs and Texas Rangers from 2013 to 2015. As of 2026, Fujikawa ranks in NPB's top ten in both career saves and career holds, a distinction shared only with Naoya Masuda.

Fujikawa was a member of the gold-medal Japanese teams in the 2006 World Baseball Classic, the 2007 Asian Baseball Championship, and the 2009 World Baseball Classic and represented Japan at the 2008 Beijing Olympics. Known for the movement on his four-seam fastball and his success as a setup man and closer, he was elected to the Meikyukai, one of Japan's two baseball halls of fame, in 2022.

== Early life ==
Fujikawa was born in Kōchi, Kōchi, in 1980, making him a member of the so-called Matsuzaka Generation. His given name literally means "baseball kid" in Japanese, and is often used as part of the phrase kōkō-kyūji (高校球児) to refer to high school baseball players in Japan. The name was chosen by his father because he had thrown a no-hitter in a rubber-ball baseball game the day before Fujikawa was born. He began playing baseball for the Little League team "Kodakasa White Wolf", first as a shortstop, then as a pitcher.

Fujikawa went on to Kōchi Commercial High School, and in his second year he both pitched and played right field in the 1997 National High School Baseball Championship. His older brother Jun'ichi was the team's starting catcher. While his team lost in the second round to Heian High School, Fujikawa's fastball was clocked at 144 km/h (89 mph) in the regional Kochi Tournament and he was regarded as one of the better high school prospects in the country. The following year, news reports revealed that the Hanshin Tigers were planning to select Fujikawa in the first round of the 1998 NPB draft. Although the Yomiuri Giants contacted Fujikawa to ask him to reject Hanshin's selection so that they could choose him in the third round of the draft and give him a larger signing bonus, Fujikawa chose to accept being drafted by Hanshin. Fujikawa was among five players selected in the first round of this draft who would go on to play in Major League Baseball, along with Daisuke Matsuzaka, Koji Uehara, Kosuke Fukudome, and Masahide Kobayashi.

During spring training before his first season with Hanshin, Fujikawa was forced to miss some team workouts to attend remedial classes at his high school. This was possible because the Tigers' spring training site in Aki, Kōchi was relatively close to Fujikawa's high school. Fujikawa pitched in three Western League farm games during the 1999 season, but was not called up to Hanshin's ichigun ("major league") team.

== Professional career ==
=== Hanshin Tigers (first stint) ===
==== Early years: 2000–2004 ====
Fujikawa made his professional debut in the first game of the 2000 season, coming on in relief in the Hanshin Tigers' season opener against the Yokohama BayStars. While he appeared in 19 games with Hanshin in 2000, he did not make any appearances in 2001. Fujikawa was used as a starting pitcher in 2002 and earned his first career win on September 11, holding the Yakult Swallows to one run over eight innings. He finished the season with a 1–5 record and a 3.71 ERA, and he was returned to a relief role in 2003.

Relegated to Hanshin's Western League team for rehabilitation from a shoulder injury in early 2004, Fujikawa decided to rebuild his pitching mechanics on the advice of pitching coach Takashi Yamaguchi. Fujikawa returned to Hanshin's ichigun team in the second half of the season and worked as a middle relief pitcher, appearing in 26 games, striking out 35 batters in 31 innings with a 2.61 ERA.

==== Setup man: 2005–2006 ====
Fujikawa became a setup pitcher for the Tigers during a breakout season in 2005. The frequently used relief pitching trio of Fujikawa, Jeff Williams, and closer Tomoyuki Kubota came to be referred to by the nickname "JFK", short for "Jeff, Fujikawa, and Kubota". As part of this bullpen, Fujikawa played an integral role in the Tigers' Central League title, striking out 139 batters in 92 1/3 innings for a 13.55 strikeout rate and holding opposing teams to a 1.36 ERA. He recorded his first career save on September 9.

Fujikawa received several awards in 2005, when he was named the Central League Most Valuable Player for the month of June and received the most fan votes for Central League relief pitcher (excluding closers) for the NPB All-Star Game. For the season, he set a then-NPB record for games pitched in a single season with 80 and led the league with 46 holds, winning the Central League Most Valuable Setup Pitcher award. He came in second in the voting for the NPB Most Valuable Player Award, behind teammate Tomoaki Kanemoto.

In 2006, Fujikawa was named to the Japanese national team to play in the inaugural World Baseball Classic. He began the regular season as the Tigers' eighth-inning setup man and set a new NPB record by pitching 38 consecutive games pitched without allowing a run and a franchise record for most consecutive scoreless innings pitched at 47 2/3. Fujikawa appeared in 63 games that year, striking out 122 in 79 1/3 innings (for a strikeout rate of 13.84) with a meagre 0.68 ERA. He led the league in holds for the second straight year with 30 despite also recording 17 saves as the closer in the latter half of the season after he was promoted to closer when Kubota missed playing time due to injury. Fujikawa himself suffered a neck injury in August, but returned to the team and earned a win in relief on August 27, shedding tears in his post-game interview.

Fujikawa was named to the Central League All-Star team for the second straight year, commenting before the All-Star Series that he wanted to "create a baseball world like the one you see in comic books." He came on in relief in Game 1 (held July 21) at Meiji Jingu Stadium, playfully indicating to then-Seibu Lions slugger Alex Cabrera that he would throw nothing but fastballs by showing him his grip from the mound. He then proceeded to strike out Cabrera (on four pitches, a ball followed by three swing-and-misses) as well as then-Hokkaido Nippon Ham Fighters first baseman Michihiro Ogasawara (after he fouled off several pitches). In Game 2, held at Sun Marine Stadium Miyazaki on July 23, he again came on in relief, striking out Orix Buffaloes slugger Kazuhiro Kiyohara swinging and causing Kiyohara to remark after the game, "I give up... he was throwing a fireball out there."

==== Closer: 2007–2012 ====
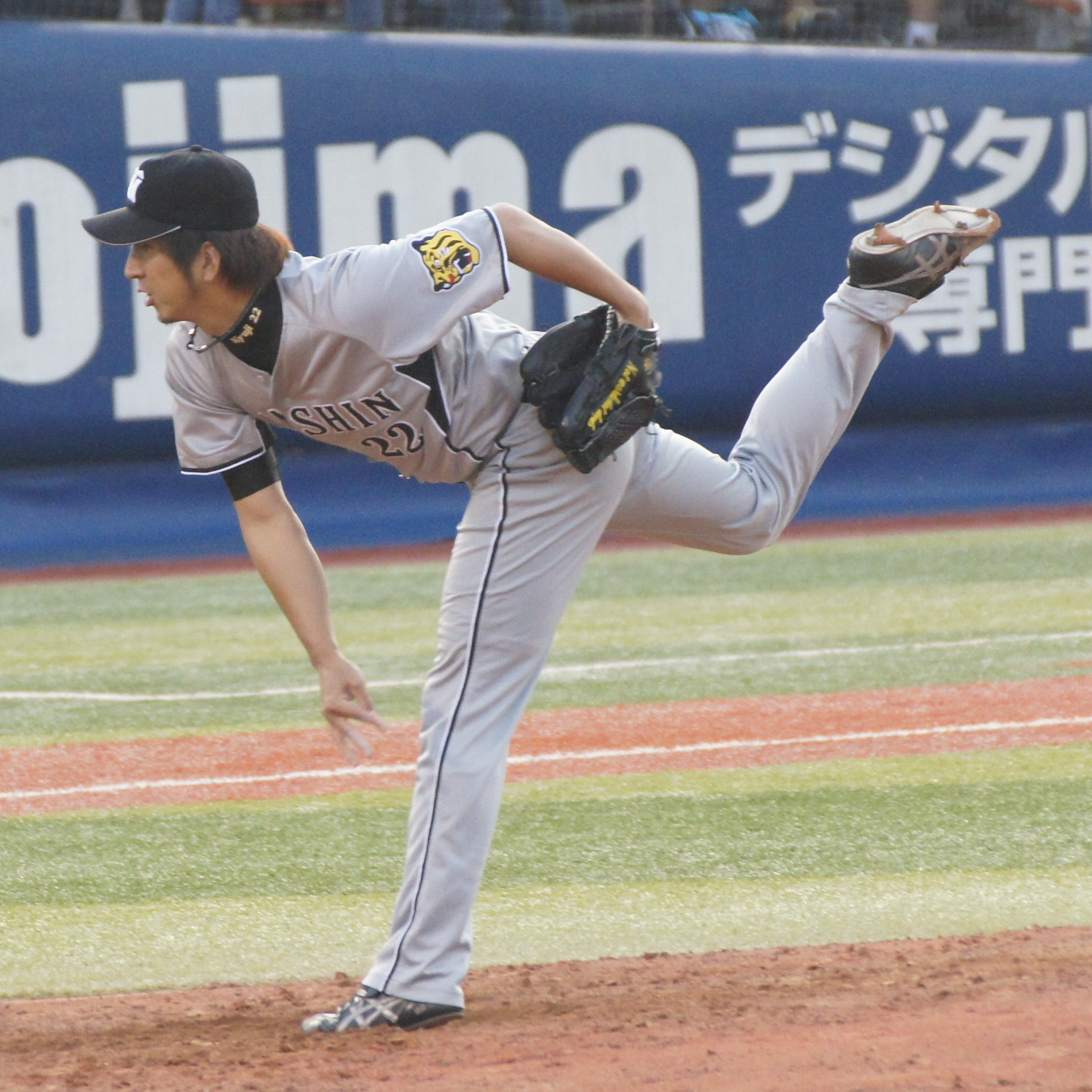
Fujikawa pitching for the Hanshin Tigers at Yokohama Stadium in 2011.

Fujikawa was officially appointed the team's closer for the start of the 2007 season. He was consistent throughout the season, making his third consecutive All-Star appearance (striking out two and closing the game for the Central League team in Game 1) and recorded his 100th strikeout of the season on September 7 in a game against the Giants, the first time a pitcher had ever recorded 100 strikeouts as a reliever in three consecutive seasons in Japan. During the Tigers' 10-game win streak in the second half of the season, he pitched in all 10 games, setting a Central League record for most consecutive games pitched and earning two wins and seven saves in that span. Fujikawa and Chunichi Dragons closer Hitoki Iwase each recorded 46 saves for the season, tying the NPB record . He put up a 5–5 record in 71 appearances with a 1.63 ERA, striking out 115 in 83 1/3 innings.

In 2008 Fujikawa set a franchise record for consecutive save conversions to begin the season with 11, and earned 30 saves by the All-Star break. He was chosen to the Japanese national team to play in the 2008 Beijing Olympics and named one of the team's three closers (along with Iwase and then-Giants right-hander Koji Uehara). However, Fujikawa gave up the tying run after coming on in the seventh inning of the semifinals against South Korea, failing to lead the team to a medal. Fujikawa pitched well after returning to the Tigers despite often being called on to pitch two innings or when the game was tied. He recorded his 100th career save against the BayStars on September 25, finishing the year with an 8–1 record, 38 saves, 90 strikeouts, and a career-best 0.67 ERA in 67 2/3 innings (63 appearances).

In 2009 Fujikawa was named to the national team to play in the World Baseball Classic, his second time playing in the tournament. By this time, Western media projected that Fujikawa could become a successful closer in the MLB. Though he did not allow a run in his four appearances in the first or second rounds, manager Tatsunori Hara opted to appoint Yu Darvish the closer for the semifinal and final, declining to use Fujikawa at all in Japan's last two games of the tournament. Fujikawa instead provided Darvish advice regarding how to prepare for the closer role. Fujikawa saw limited appearances the first month of the regular season, and he reported pain in his right elbow and was briefly removed from the active roster in May. For the season he earned 25 saves in 49 appearances with a 1.25 ERA.

In 2010 Fujikawa earned 28 saves with a 2.01 ERA. In 2011 he led the league with 41 saves and had a 1.24 ERA, with 80 strikeouts in 51 innings pitched. In 2012 he served as the team's co-captain along with Takashi Toritani and earned his 200th save. For the year he had 24 saves in 48 appearances and 1.32 ERA. After the season he exercised his right to become a free agent eligible to sign with teams outside of Japan, and he hired Arn Tellem as his agent; he received as many as ten offers from MLB teams. Fujikawa had reportedly requested to be posted to the MLB in previous years.

=== Chicago Cubs ===
On December 2, 2012, Fujikawa agreed to terms on a two-year contract with a vesting option for a third year with the Chicago Cubs of Major League Baseball. Fujikawa was introduced by the Cubs on December 6, and expressed enthusiasm about the challenge of playing in the MLB and the similarity between the Cubs' home stadium of Wrigley Field and the home park of the Hanshin Tigers, Koshien Stadium.

Fujikawa earned a save in his MLB debut on opening day in 2013. A week later he was named the Cubs' closer and earned his second save. In his next appearance, he blew a save but received the win when the Cubs won on a game-ending hit in the bottom of the ninth. Fujikawa had already been injured before this game, and following it he was put on the disabled list with a forearm strain.

Fujikawa returned to the Cubs roster in May and gave up one run on three hits with ten strikeouts in 7 2/3 innings pitched in seven appearances. However, he suffered an elbow injury in a game on May 26. An MRI revealed a ruptured ulnar collateral ligament in his right elbow, and he underwent Tommy John surgery in a procedure performed by James Andrews on June 11. Fujikawa missed the remainder of the 2013 season and most of the 2014 season due to this injury. Upon his return in August 2014, Fujikawa made fifteen appearances for the Cubs, compiling a 4.85 ERA with seventeen strikeouts. His 2015 club option was declined by the Cubs on October 30, making him a free agent.

=== Texas Rangers ===
In December 2014, Fujikawa agreed to a one-year, $1.1 million contract with the Texas Rangers with a team option for a second year. He was injured before the season began and made only two appearances with the Rangers, giving up 3 runs in 1 2/3 innings, before being released by the organization on May 22, 2015.

=== Kochi Fighting Dogs ===
After being released by the Texas Rangers, Fujikawa was contacted by the Hanshin Tigers about a new contract, but he chose instead to join his hometown team, the Kochi Fighting Dogs of the Shikoku Island League. In six appearances with the Fighting Dogs during 2015, Fujikawa posted a 2–1 record and 0.82 ERA in 33 innings, including two complete games and a shutout.

=== Hanshin Tigers (second stint) ===
On November 14, 2015, Fujikawa agreed to a two-year, 300-million-yen deal to return to the Hanshin Tigers.

In 2016 Fujikawa was briefly used as a starter, but then returned to a relief role, ending the season with 5 wins, 6 losses, 3 saves, and 10 holds. In 2017 he had 3 wins and no losses with 6 holds in 52 appearances, collecting 71 strikeouts and earning a 2.22 ERA. On May 30 he earned his 1000th NPB strikeout after 771 2/3 total career innings pitched, making him the fastest to reach this threshold in NPB history. In 2018 his usage in high-leverage situations increased, and he had 5 wins, 3 losses, 21 holds, and 2 saves in 53 appearances, with 67 strikeouts and a 2.32 ERA. In 2019 Fujikawa was sometimes used in his former role as a closer, and he finished the season with 4 wins, 1 loss, 16 saves, and 23 holds in 56 appearances, with 83 strikeouts and a 1.77 ERA.

In 2020 Fujikawa appeared in games more rarely, and on August 31, 2020, Fujikawa announced he would retire at the conclusion of the 2020 season. He pitched a scoreless inning in his final game on November 10.

== Coaching career ==
Fujikawa was appointed a special assistant for the Hanshin Tigers after his retirement in 2020, and he was promoted to an administrative position with the team in 2023. During his time as a special assistant, he released a book on baseball philosophy and his own career titled Four-Seam Fireball: Professional Mindset (火の玉ストレート プロフェッショナルの覚悟, Hi no tama sutorēto purofesshonaru no kakugo) and served as a color commentator for baseball broadcasts on television stations including NHK. He was also elected to the Meikyukai, one of the two Japanese baseball halls of fame.

Fujikawa became Hanshin's manager after Akinobu Okada's contract expired at the end of the 2024 season. In Fujikawa's first season as manager in 2025, the Hanshin Tigers went 85–54–4 and became the fastest team in Central League history to clinch the league championship on September 7. The team also swept the 2025 Central League Climax Series over the Yokohama DeNA BayStars, but lost the 2025 Japan Series to the Fukuoka SoftBank Hawks, 4 games to 1. Following the season, Fujikawa was named the Central League Manager of the Year.

In April 2026 Fujikawa reached 100 managerial wins in his 167th game with Hanshin, tying a Central League record set by Tatsunori Hara for the fewest games required to reach this mark. Hanshin won consecutive Central League titles for the first time in team history in the 2026 season, and Fujikawa became the first person in Central League history to lead his team to championships in each of his first two seasons as manager.

== Pitching style ==
Fujikawa pitched right-handed with a conventional overhand delivery. His motion included a momentary hesitation after raising his left leg and loading his hips. Though he increasingly used a variety of offspeed pitches later in his career, Fujikawa was best known for his four-seam fastball.

=== Fastball ===
Fujikawa's four-seam fastball, which usually clocked 148 to 152 km/h (92 to 94 mph) but topped out at 156 km/h (97 mph), is often described in Japan using the term hi-no-tama sutorēto (火の玉ストレート), which literally means "fireball fastball". Fujikawa's fastball was notable for the late life at the end of its trajectory that made it appear to "hop" in front of hitters and seem faster than radar gun readings would suggest.

In November 2006, TV Asahi aired a documentary on Fujikawa's fastball as part of a series on professional baseball on its popular news program "Hōdō Station" (報道ステーション). Through the use of high speed cameras, the program found that Fujikawa's fastball had a particularly high spin rate of 45 revolutions per second (2700 rpm). Moreover, they found that while the spin axis of the average four-seam fastball is tilted approximately 30 degrees relative to its trajectory to the plate, the spin axis of Fujikawa's was only five degrees.

According to the principles of the Magnus effect, the faster an object spins and the less it is tilted about its vertical axis, the more lift it will create, causing the ball to travel in a trajectory more closely modeling a straight line than a typical fastball would. The program hypothesized that Fujikawa's fastball, if thrown from an identical release point at exactly the same target, would cross home plate a full 30 cm (12 in) higher than the average fastball, and posited that this could explain why Fujikawa's fastball appeared to rise to hitters as it approached the plate.

=== Secondary pitches ===
In addition to the fastball, Fujikawa often threw a forkball and curveball, as well as rarely throwing a cutter and a changeup. During Fujikawa's early period of success beginning in 2004, a majority of his pitches were fastballs, but he later utilized a larger share of forkballs and curveballs.

== Entrance music ==
It was customary for fans to sing along with Fujikawa's entrance music, the song "every little thing every precious thing" by the rock band Lindberg, when Fujikawa entered home games at Koshien Stadium or Kyocera Dome Osaka. Fujikawa has said that the song has had special meaning for him and his wife since before they got married.

== See also ==
- List of Major League Baseball players from Japan
