= Tatsuhito =

- Gender: Male

Origin
- Origin: Japanese
- Meaning: Different meanings depending on the kanji used

Tatsuhito (written: 達人, 竜人 or 竜一) is a masculine Japanese given name. Notable people with the name include:

- Tatsuhito Katoh (加藤 竜人; born 1976), Japanese baseball player
- Tatsuhito Senga (千賀 達人), Japanese professional wrestler
- Tatsuhito Takaiwa (高岩 竜一; born 1972), Zainichi-Korean professional wrestler
