= Yuji Iiyama =

Japanese baseball player

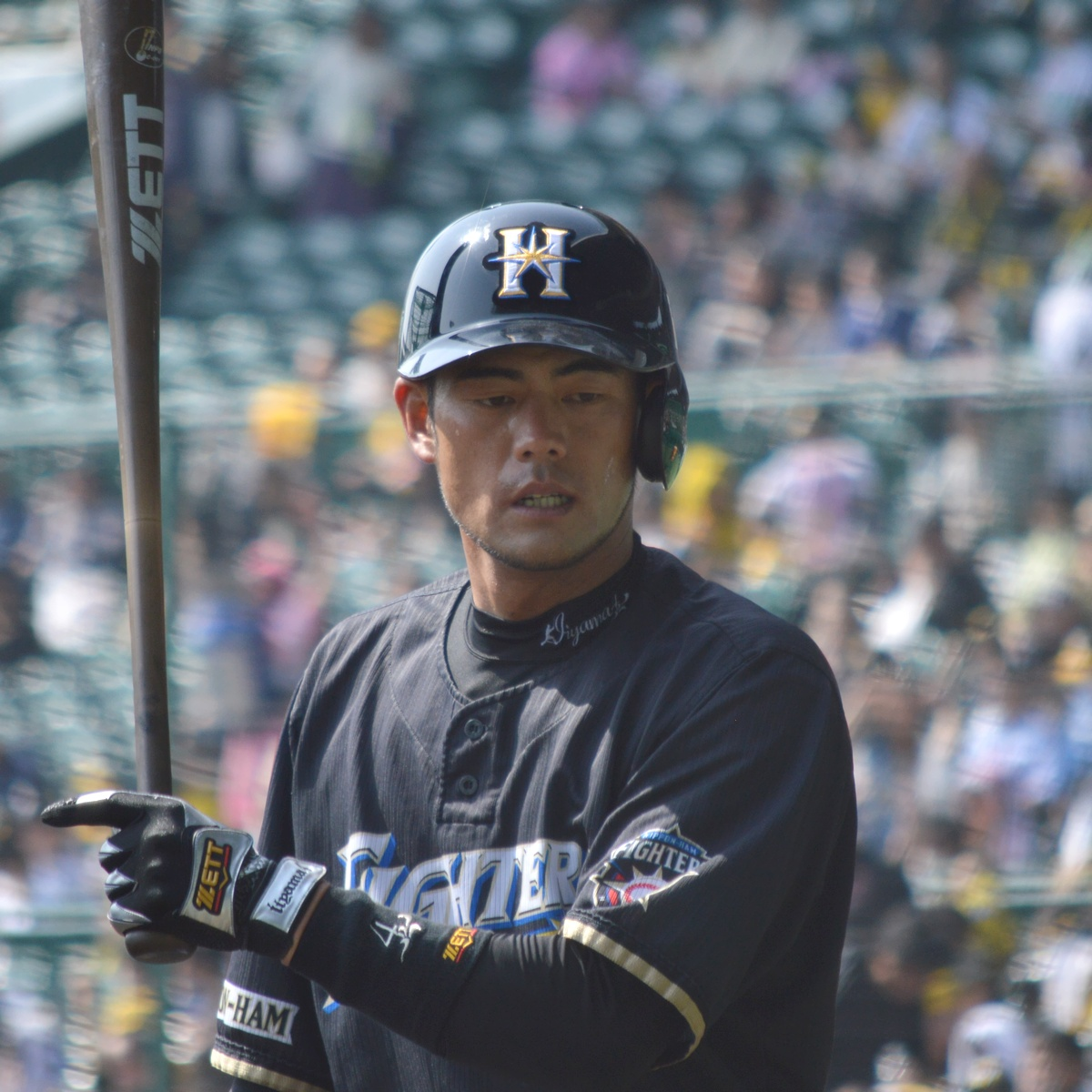
- Iiyama with the Hokkaido Nippon-Ham Fighters

Chunichi Dragons – No. 74
- Infielder/Coach
- Born: July 13, 1979 (age 46)
- Batted: Right Threw: Right

NPB debut
- July 31, 2001, for the Nippon-Ham Fighters

Last NPB appearance
- October 3, 2017, for the Hokkaido Nippon-Ham Fighters

NPB statistics (through 2017)
- Batting average: .202
- Home runs: 1
- RBI: 45
- Stats at Baseball Reference

Teams
- As player: Nippon-Ham Fighters/Hokkaido Nippon-Ham Fighters (2001, 2003, 2005–2017); As coach: Hokkaido Nippon-Ham Fighters (2018–2023); Chunichi Dragons (2025–Present)

Yuji Iiyama (飯山 裕志, born July 13, 1979, in Ichikikushikino, Kagoshima) is a Japanese former professional baseball infielder and current coach for the Chunichi Dragons in Japan's Nippon Professional Baseball. He played his entire professional career with the Hokkaido Nippon Ham Fighters and served as a coach after retirement in 2017.

== Early life and amateur career ==
Iiyama began playing baseball in elementary school with the boys' league team "Yoshino Buffalo." As a sixth-grader, he participated in the national tournament as both a pitcher and catcher. During middle school, he developed into a versatile utility player, playing pitcher, catcher, shortstop, and center fielder positions.

At Reimei High School, Iiyama participated in the Meiji Jingu Tournament during the fall of his first year. In his third year, he was a member of the Kagoshima Prefecture team that reached the semifinals and traveled to Shanghai for international competition.

== Professional career ==
=== Draft and early years (1997-2004) ===
Iiyama was selected fourth overall by the Nippon Ham Fighters in the 1997 draft as a shortstop. He spent several years developing in the minor leagues, where he demonstrated strong defensive skills but struggled with consistent offensive production.

In 2003, he recorded his best minor league season with a .328 batting average, 11 home runs, and a .578 slugging percentage, ranking third in the Eastern League. Despite these impressive numbers, his overall batting performance prevented promotion to the major league level.

=== Breakthrough and utility role (2005-2009) ===
Iiyama made his first opening day roster appearance in 2005, recording his first RBI and first professional hit. He established himself as a valuable utility player, capable of playing second base, shortstop, third base, outfield positions, and even catching in limited appearances.

In 2006, due to an injury to third baseman Kuniyuki Kimoto, Iiyama earned his first opening day start in nine years. He completed his first full season without demotion to the minor leagues. His defensive versatility led to him forming a "super sub-combination" with Toshimasa Konda, alongside pitchers Hisashi Takeda, Michael Nakamura, and Satoshi Nakajima.

The 2007 season marked a career highlight, as Iiyama appeared in a career-high 105 games and posted a .306 batting average. He proved particularly effective against left-handed pitching, maintaining a batting average above .500 in those matchups. On October 2, 2007, against the Tohoku Rakuten Golden Eagles, he recorded his first four-hit game and four RBIs in a single contest.

=== Mid-career struggles and resilience (2010-2012) ===
After experiencing difficulties in 2008, Iiyama rebounded in 2009, leading the league in defensive appearances for the third consecutive year and batting .333 in limited opportunities.

The 2010 season brought both challenges and a memorable highlight. Despite defensive struggles early in the season, Iiyama achieved a career milestone on August 20, hitting his first professional home run off Brian Sikorski in the bottom of the ninth inning against the Seibu Lions. The dramatic three-run homer tied the game, and Nippon-Ham eventually won in extra innings for their 500th victory since moving to Hokkaido.

In 2012, Iiyama acquired domestic free agency rights on October 24. He delivered another clutch performance in the Japan Series, hitting a walk-off home run off Kentaro Nishimura in the 12th inning of Game 4 on October 31.

=== Final playing years (2013-2017) ===
Iiyama's later playing years were marked by reduced playing time but continued contributions as a defensive specialist. In 2016, he was limited to 36 games due to a right thigh injury but chose not to exercise his free agency rights, expressing his commitment to the organization.

The 2017 season began with a left biceps femoris strain that kept him in the minor leagues until August 9. On September 14, he announced his decision to retire at the end of the season. His retirement game took place on October 3, 2017, against the Orix Buffaloes at Sapporo Dome, where he played shortstop and completed his final career play by fielding a grounder from Koji Oshiro.

== Coaching career ==
Following his retirement, Iiyama was appointed as the Nippon-Ham Fighters' second-division infield defense coach in December 2017. He was promoted to first-division infield defense coach in 2020 and later expanded his role to include baserunning instruction in 2022-2023.

After a brief stint as a scout in 2024, Iiyama joined the Chunichi Dragons as position player coordinator for the 2025 season, wearing uniform number 74. His appointment came at the request of manager Kazuki Inoue, who praised Iiyama's coaching abilities.

== Playing style ==
Iiyama was renowned as a defensive specialist and utility player capable of playing all infield positions competently. He earned nicknames including "defensive master" and "defensive closer" for his late-game defensive contributions. His career was notable for the rarity of spending most of his professional tenure as a defensive replacement player.

== Career statistics ==
=== Batting ===
Year	Team	G	PA	AB	R	H	2B	3B	HR	RBI	SB	CS	BB	SO	AVG	OBP	SLG	OPS
2001	Nippon Ham	7	3	3	0	0	0	0	0	0	1	0	0	1	.000	.000	.000	.000
2003	Nippon Ham	4	1	1	1	0	0	0	0	0	0	0	0	0	.000	.000	.000	.000
2005	Nippon Ham	42	33	31	3	7	3	0	0	2	1	0	1	11	.226	.242	.323	.565
2006	Nippon Ham	86	107	92	12	13	1	0	0	3	2	3	7	26	.141	.218	.152	.370
2007	Nippon Ham	105	55	49	16	15	3	0	0	7	3	0	4	14	.306	.352	.367	.719
2008	Nippon Ham	74	54	49	3	8	2	0	0	2	0	0	3	13	.163	.212	.204	.416
2009	Nippon Ham	76	41	36	14	12	0	0	0	1	2	0	1	5	.333	.351	.333	.685
2010	Nippon Ham	72	160	137	12	30	0	0	1	12	2	1	5	40	.219	.241	.241	.482
2011	Nippon Ham	99	194	169	9	31	0	2	0	7	3	2	2	35	.183	.192	.207	.399
2012	Nippon Ham	85	74	68	7	12	1	0	0	2	1	0	1	17	.176	.200	.191	.391
2013	Nippon Ham	56	29	26	6	4	1	0	0	1	0	0	1	9	.154	.179	.192	.371
2014	Nippon Ham	84	62	51	10	11	2	0	0	4	0	0	5	15	.216	.286	.255	.541
2015	Nippon Ham	75	29	24	4	6	2	0	0	4	0	1	1	6	.250	.280	.333	.613
2016	Nippon Ham	36	3	3	1	1	1	0	0	0	0	0	0	2	.333	.333	.667	1.000
2017	Nippon Ham	10	4	4	0	0	0	0	0	0	0	0	0	2	.000	.000	.000	.000
Career		911	849	743	98	150	16	2	1	45	15	7	31	196	.202	.235	.233	.468

== Notable achievements ==
First professional home run: August 20, 2010, vs. Saitama Seibu Lions (Brian Sikorski)

Japan Series walk-off home run: October 31, 2012, vs. Yomiuri Giants (Kentaro Nishimura)

Jersey numbers: 57 (1998-2007), 4 (2008-2017), 71 (2018-2023), 74 (2025-present)
