= Yoshio Itoi =

Japanese baseball player (born 1981)

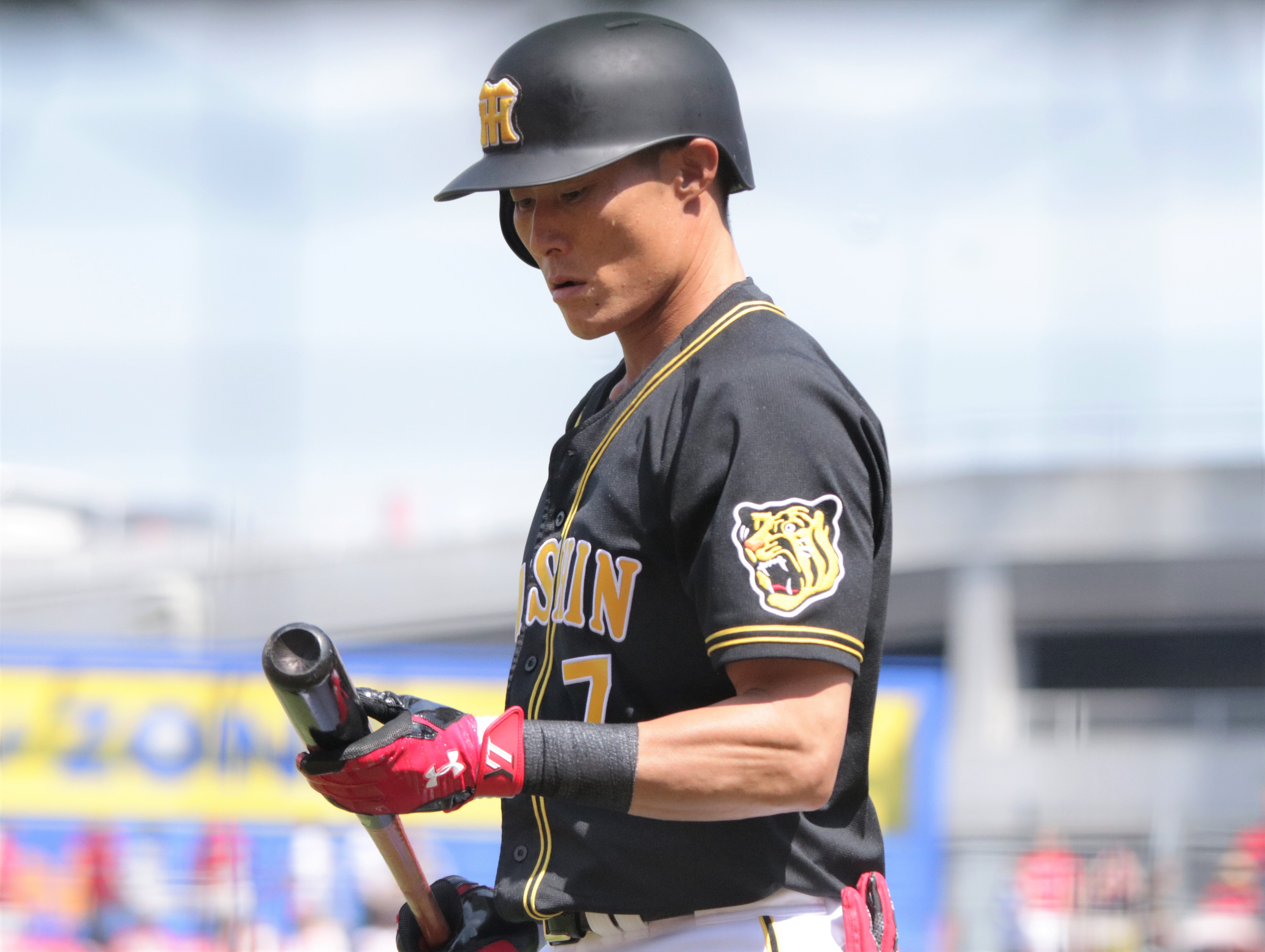
- Itoi with the Hanshin Tigers
- Outfielder
- Born: July 31, 1981 (age 45); Kyoto Prefecture, Japan
- Batted: Left Threw: Right

NPB debut
- March 27, 2007, for the Hokkaido Nippon-Ham Fighters

Last NPB appearance
- September 21, 2022, for the Hanshin Tigers

NPB statistics
- Batting average: .297
- Home runs: 171
- Runs batted in: 765
- Stolen bases: 300
- Stats at Baseball Reference

Teams
- Hokkaido Nippon-Ham Fighters (2004–2012); Orix Buffaloes (2013–2016); Hanshin Tigers (2017–2022)

Career highlights and awards
- 2012 PLCS MVP; Pacific League Batting Leader (2014); Pacific League stolen base leader (2016); 3× Pacific League OBP Leader (2011, 2012, 2014); 5× Best Nine Award (2009, 2011, 2012, 2014, 2016); 7× Pacific League Golden Glove Award (2009–2014, 2016); 10× NPB All-Star (2009–2018)

Yoshio Itoi (糸井 嘉男, Itoi Yoshio; born July 31, 1981) is a Japanese former professional baseball outfielder. He played in Nippon Professional Baseball (NPB) for the Hokkaido Nippon-Ham Fighters, the Orix Buffaloes, and the Hanshin Tigers. Itoi bats left-handed and throws right-handed. He played for team Japan in WBC 2013, and hit for Japan in games against Brazil (4th batter) and China (5th batter).

== Career ==
=== Early life ===
Itoi was a pitcher during his time as a student, and was the ace pitcher for Kinki University during his 4th year, where he finished the spring league with a 5–0 record with 2 shutouts, and won the MVP and Best Pitcher award. He was also included in the Best Nine. He finished his university career with a 9–1 record.

=== Nippon Ham Fighters ===
Itoi was drafted into the Fighters in the fall of 2003, and was considered a power pitcher, being able to pitch 151 km/h (94 mph) fastball but had control problems and was unable to muster up decent breaking balls. He was also marred with injury and spent 2 years in the ni-gun (Japanese equivalent of the minor league).

Although Itoi had problems developing as a good pitcher in the pros, his outstanding batting sense, running speed (50m in 5 seconds), and strong throwing arm prompted Fighters GM Shigeru Takada to convert him into an outfielder. Just 5 months after converting into an outfielder, Itoi won the Eastern League's Monthly MVP award, hitting .397 in September 2006.

Itoi collected his first hit and stolen base in Ichigun level in the 2007 season, but spent most time in Niggun, having only played 7 games at Ichigun level. In 2008, Itoi was the Opening Day's starting left fielder, but injury again put him out of action. He bounced back near the end of the season, however, and hit his first home run soon after. He was the lead off batter for Fighters during that year's Climax Series, and was defensively outstanding.

In 2009, Itoi replaced Hichori Morimoto as Fighter's everyday starting center field. He moved up the batting order as the season progress, hitting in the two-hole and even as the third batter when Atsunori Inaba was absent. Itoi won the Monthly MVP award in June, and was selected for the first time to play in the All Star Game. He ended the year hitting .306 with 15 home runs, 24 stolen bases, and a league high 40 doubles, and won his first Golden Glove award.

Itoi continued to be an integral part of the Fighters, winning his second Golden Glove in 2010 and ended the year hitting .309 with 15 home runs and 26 stolen bases.

After the NPB switched the official game ball into the pitcher friendly ball that lead to a league-wide fall in batting statistics, Itoi continued to flourish in the 2011 season, hitting .319 with 11 home runs and 31 stolen bases, and a league high .411 OBP (the only player with OBP of more than .400 that year in whole of NPB) mainly as the third batter. He won his third straight Golden Glove that year.

In 2012, Itoi switched from center field to right field as Taiwanese Dai-Kang Yang was slotted into center field. Itoi was not in his best during the first half of the season, hitting .289 with 2 home runs. He started to pick up in the second half of the season, hitting .380 with 3 home runs in September to win the Monthly MVP award. He ended the year with .304 batting average, 9 homers, 22 stolen base, and second straight year of league high .404 OBP, also winning his fourth Golden Glove. Itoi expressed interest at the end of the season to be posted to the Major Leagues, but was instead traded to the Orix Buffaloes in a 5 player deal on January 25, 2013.

=== Orix Buffaloes ===
Itoi was involved in a surprising 5 player trade at the end of the 2012 season, which saw him moving to Pacific League rivals Orix Buffaloes. He hit a homer against his former club Fighters on 11 May 2013 to join the ranks of players to have hit at least a home run against each NPB team. During his time at Orix, he won the Best Nine Award twice, in 2014 and 2016. He was the Batting Champion in 2014, and the stolen base champion in 2016. He was an NPB All-Star in all four years, and he won the Pacific League Golden Glove Award in 2014 and 2016.

In 2013, Orix Fans started waving rainbow-themed flags with Itoi's name and number during his at-bat. It is a reference to the seven colors in a rainbow, which is the equal amount to Itoi's seven jersey number. This ritual carried onto Hanshin Tigers fans after his move to the mentioned team.

At the end of the 2016 season, Itoi announced his decision to test the free agent market. The Hanshin Tigers were the most persistent team, and after 9 days of negotiations, he agreed to leave his former club and move to the Central League.

=== Hanshin Tigers ===
He was selected for the 2017 and 2018 NPB All-Star Games. Itoi performed strongly from 2017 to 2019, but slowed down significantly in the 2020 season. After an 18-year professional baseball career, Itoi officially announced his retirement on September 13, 2022, and played a retirement game against the Hiroshima Toyo Carp on September 21.

== International career ==
Itoi was selected to play for Japan national baseball team in the 2013 World Baseball Classic, and started all 3 games as right fielder in the first pool round, batting cleanup in the first 2 games. He is amongst the most consistent batters for Team Japan, getting a hit in each game. During the second pool round, Itoi replaced the ineffective Hisayoshi Chono in center field and continued his batting consistency, hitting a double against Chinese Taipei (Also Team Japan's only second extra base hit up until that moment, with the other also provided by Itoi) and hit a 3-run home run in the defeat of Netherlands. In the semifinal round, however, they lost to upstart Puerto Rico 3–1, thus preventing the team from advancing to the Championship round.

== Television ==
He won Netflix's Final Draft TV series, Netflix's first Japanese-produced physical survival series, which premiered on August 12, 2025. He won the prize of 27 million yen. He then competed as part of Team Japan on Physical: Asia.

== Filmography ==
=== Web shows ===
Year	Title	Role	Notes	Ref.
2025	Final Draft	Winner	Netflix	
2025	Physical: Asia	Contestant	Netflix	
