= Keizo Kawashima =

Japanese baseball player

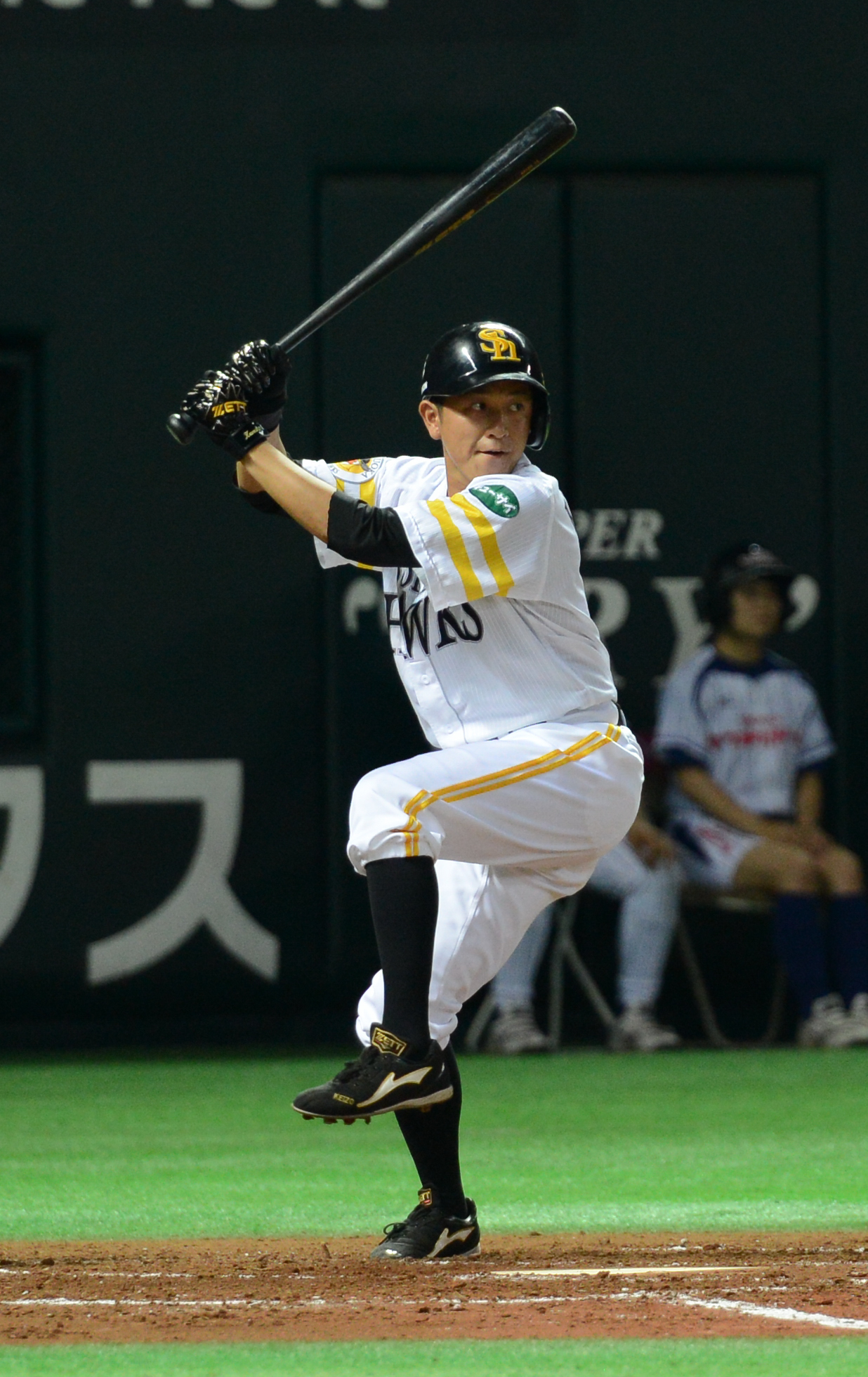
- Kawashima with the Fukuoka SoftBank Hawks

Orix Buffaloes – No. 82
- infielder / Coach
- Born: October 5, 1983 (age 43); Sasebo, Nagasaki, Japan
- Batted: Right Threw: Right

NPB debut
- April 2, 2006, for the Hokkaido Nippon-Ham Fighters

Last NPB appearance
- July 23, 2022, for the Tohoku Rakuten Golden Eagles

NPB statistics (through 2022 season)
- Batting average: .251
- Home runs: 38
- RBI: 185
- Hits: 483
- Stolen base: 59
- Sacrifice bunt: 79
- Stats at Baseball Reference

Teams
- As player: Hokkaido Nippon-Ham Fighters (2006–2007); Tokyo Yakult Swallows (2008–2014); Fukuoka SoftBank Hawks (2014–2021); Tohoku Rakuten Golden Eagles (2022); As coach: Tohoku Rakuten Golden Eagles (2023–2024); Orix Buffaloes (2025–present)

Career highlights and awards
- 5× Japan Series Champion (2015, 2017–2020)

Keizo Kawashima (川島 慶三, Kawashima Keizō; born October 5, 1983) is a Japanese professional baseball player. He plays infielder for the Tohoku Rakuten Golden Eagles.

== Professional career ==
On November 18, 2005, Kawashima was drafted by the Hokkaido Nippon-Ham Fighters in the 2005 Nippon Professional Baseball draft.

=== Hokkaido Nippon-Ham Fighters ===
On April 2, 2006, Kawashima debuted in the Pacific League against the Orix Buffaloes. And He recorded his first RBI on April 15 and his first hit on April 16. In 2006 season, Kawashima played 24 games in the Pacific League.

In 2007 season, Kawashima has been registered as an outfielder. he played in only 10 games in the Pacific League. But he was selected as the Japan Series roster in the 2007 Japan Series.

On January 11, 2008, Kawashima was traded to the Tokyo Yakult Swallows.

=== Tokyo Yakult Swallows ===
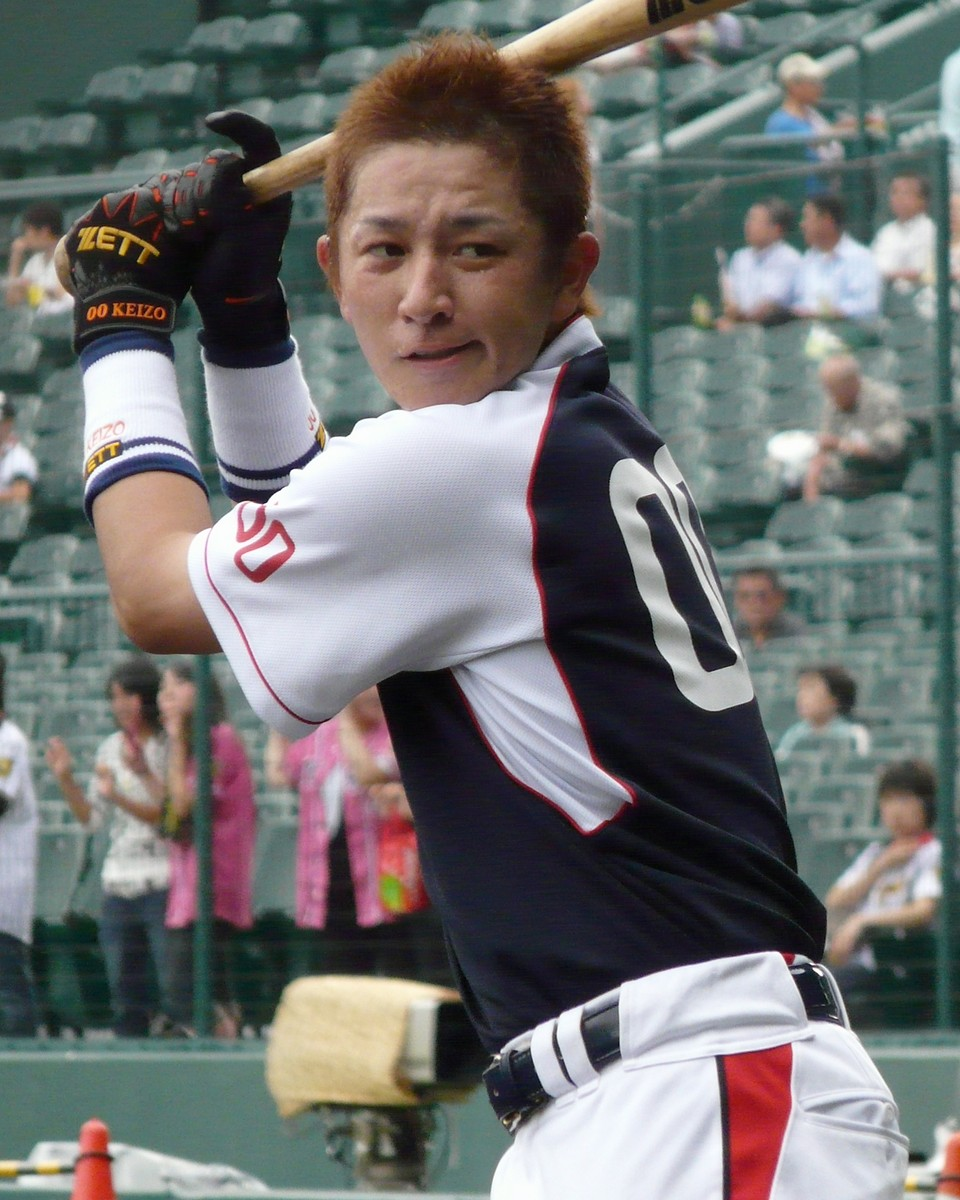
Kawashima with the Tokyo Yakult Swallows.

In 2008 season, Kawashima has been registered as an infielder. On April 27, he recorded his first home run. In 2008 season, he finished the regular season in 121 games with a batting average of .255, a 4 home runs, RBI of 35, and a 20 stolen bases.

In 2009 season, Kawashima finished the regular season in 118 games with a batting average of .255, a 12 home runs, and a RBI of 43, and a 8 stolen bases. However, on September 19, he left the team due to pain in his right elbow. He chose conservative therapy without surgery, but his recovery was poor.

On March 4, 2010, Kawashima had surgery on his right elbow. And he spent the 2010 season rehabilitating his right elbow.

In 2011 season, Kawashima recovered from the injury to the team, but broke his middle finger on April 12, the first game he returned to, on a hit by pitch. He recovered from his fracture on July 30, but was only able to play 40 games, partly because of that. Kawashima had a recurrence of pain in his right elbow and underwent Tommy John surgery on October 20.

In 2012 season, Kawashima spent the season in rehabilitation.

In 2013 season, Kawashima finished the regular season in 101 games with a batting average of .213, a 4 home runs, and a RBI of 14.

On July 11, 2014, Kawashima was traded to the Fukuoka SoftBank Hawks.

=== Fukuoka SoftBank Hawks ===
On July 25, Kawashima entered the game for the first time at the Hawks. In 2014 season, Kawashima finished the regular season in 29 games with a batting average of .233, and a RBI of 2.

In 2015 season, Kawashima finished the regular season in 77 games with a batting average of .274, a 2 home runs, and a RBI of 20. In the 2015 Japan Series against the Tokyo Yakult Swallows, he recorded his first RBI hit in the Japan Series and contributed to the team's second consecutive victory.

In the match against Nippon-Ham Fighters on April 3, 2016, Kawashima crossed with runner Kensuke Tanaka on the second base and injured his right lower leg. As a result, he played only 20 games in the 2016 season.

In 2017 season, Kawashima finished the regular season in 81 games with a batting average of .264, a 5 home runs, and a RBI of 13. In particular, he had a batting average of .313 against the left pitcher as of September 3.

In the 2017 Japan Series against the Yokohama DeNA BayStars, Kawashima hit the game-winning run batted in single in Game 6, deciding the team's Japan Series champion.

In 2018 season, Kawashima finished the regular season in 91 games with a batting average of .268, a 3 home runs, and a RBI of 16. And in the 2018 Japan Series against the Hiroshima Toyo Carp, Kawashima hit Game 1 and contributed to the team's second consecutive Japan Series champion.

In 2019 season, Kawashima played only 47 games due to left shoulder pain, but recorded a batting average of .364. He recorded a high average batting average of .396 (48-19) against the left-handed pitcher. In the 2019 Japan Series, against the Yomiuri Giants, he recorded stolen bases and contributed to the team's third consecutive Japan Series champion.

In 2020 season, Kawashima finished the regular season in 59 games with a batting average of .263, a 4 home runs, and a RBI of 9. In the 2020 Japan Series against the Yomiuri Giants, he contributed to the team's fourth consecutive Japan Series champions.
