= Yasuo Kubo =

Japanese baseball player and coach

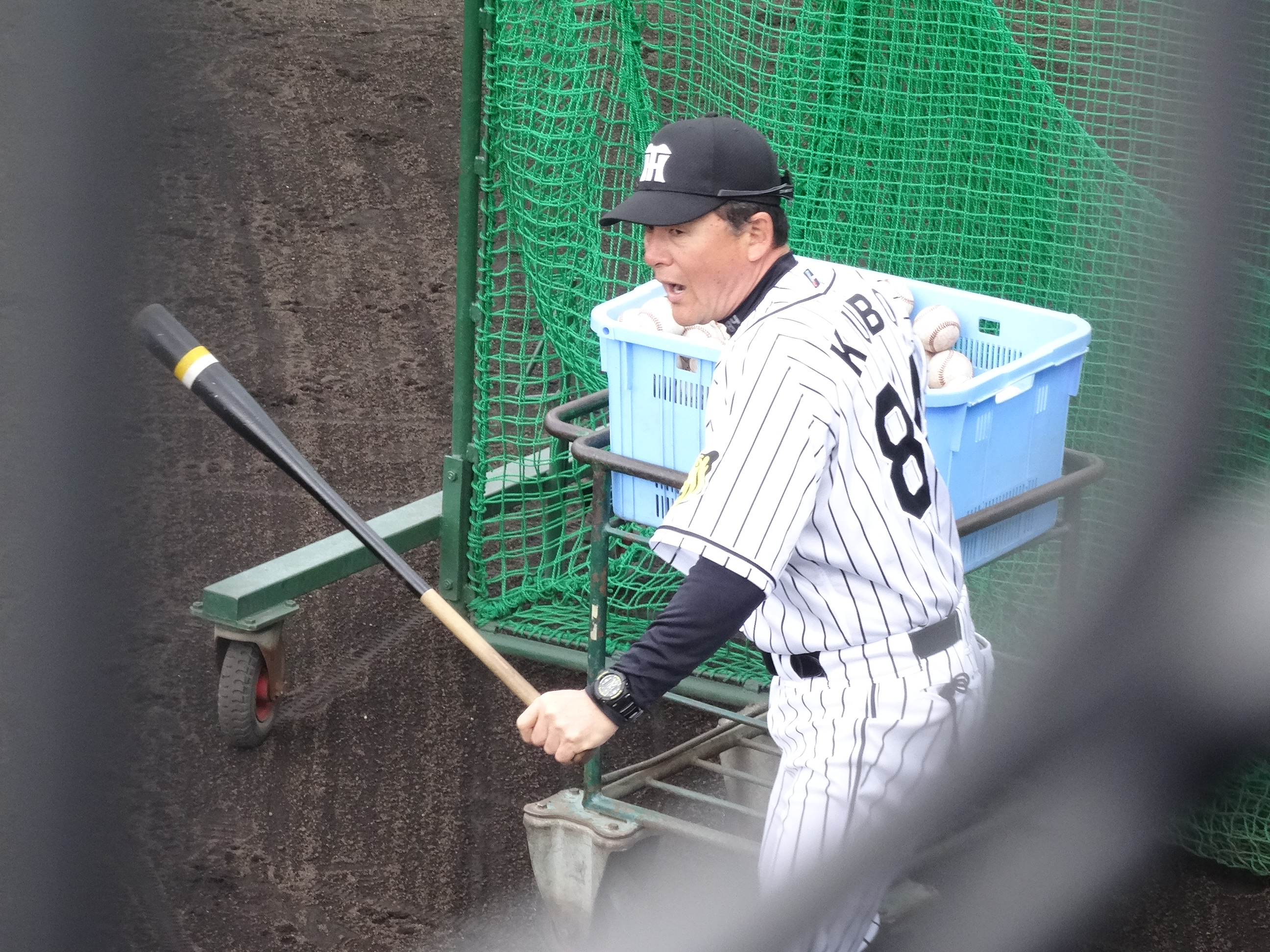

Yomiuri Giants – No. 84
- Pitcher / Coach
- Born: April 8, 1958; Iizuka, Fukuoka, Japan
- Batted: Right Threw: Right

NPB debut
- July 18, 1978, for the Kintetsu Buffaloes

Last appearance
- 1997, for the Kintetsu Buffaloes

NPB statistics (through 1997)
- Win–loss record: 71–62
- Earned run average: 4.32
- Strikeouts: 847
- Saves: 30
- Stats at Baseball Reference

Teams
- As player: Kintetsu Buffaloes (1977–1988, 1996–1997); Hanshin Tigers (1988–1996); As coach: Kintetsu Buffaloes/Osaka Kintetsu Buffaloes (1998–2004); Hanshin Tigers (2005–2011, 2013–2017); Fukuoka SoftBank Hawks (2018–2020); Yomiuri Giants (2023–)

Yasuo Kubo (久保 康生, Kubo Yasuo; born April 8, 1958 in Iizuka, Fukuoka, Japan) is a Japanese former Nippon Professional Baseball pitcher.
