= Kazunori Yamamoto =

Japanese baseball player

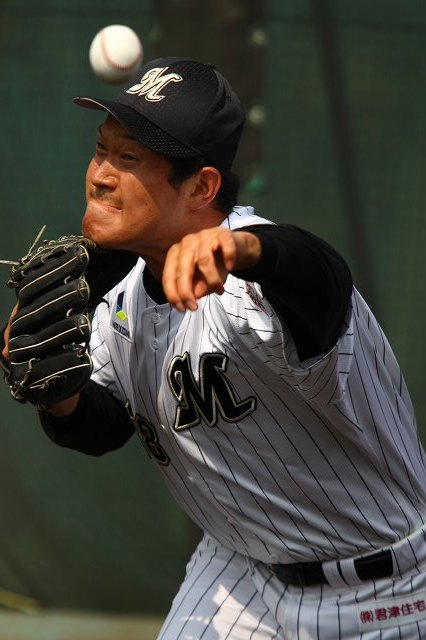
- Pitcher
- Born: June 13, 1983 (age 43)
- Bats: Left Throws: Left

NPB debut
- 2007, for the Hokkaido Nippon-Ham Fighters

NPB statistics (through 2011)
- Win–loss record: 1–1
- ERA: 5.29
- Strikeouts: 39
- Stats at Baseball Reference

Teams
- Hokkaido Nippon-Ham Fighters (2007–2010); Chiba Lotte Marines (2011)

Kazunori Yamamoto (山本 一徳, born June 13, 1983) is a Japanese former professional baseball pitcher in Japan's Nippon Professional Baseball. He played for the Hokkaido Nippon-Ham Fighters in 2007, and from 2009 to 2010 and with the Chiba Lotte Marines in 2011.
