= Jobu Morita =

Japanese baseball player (born 1980)

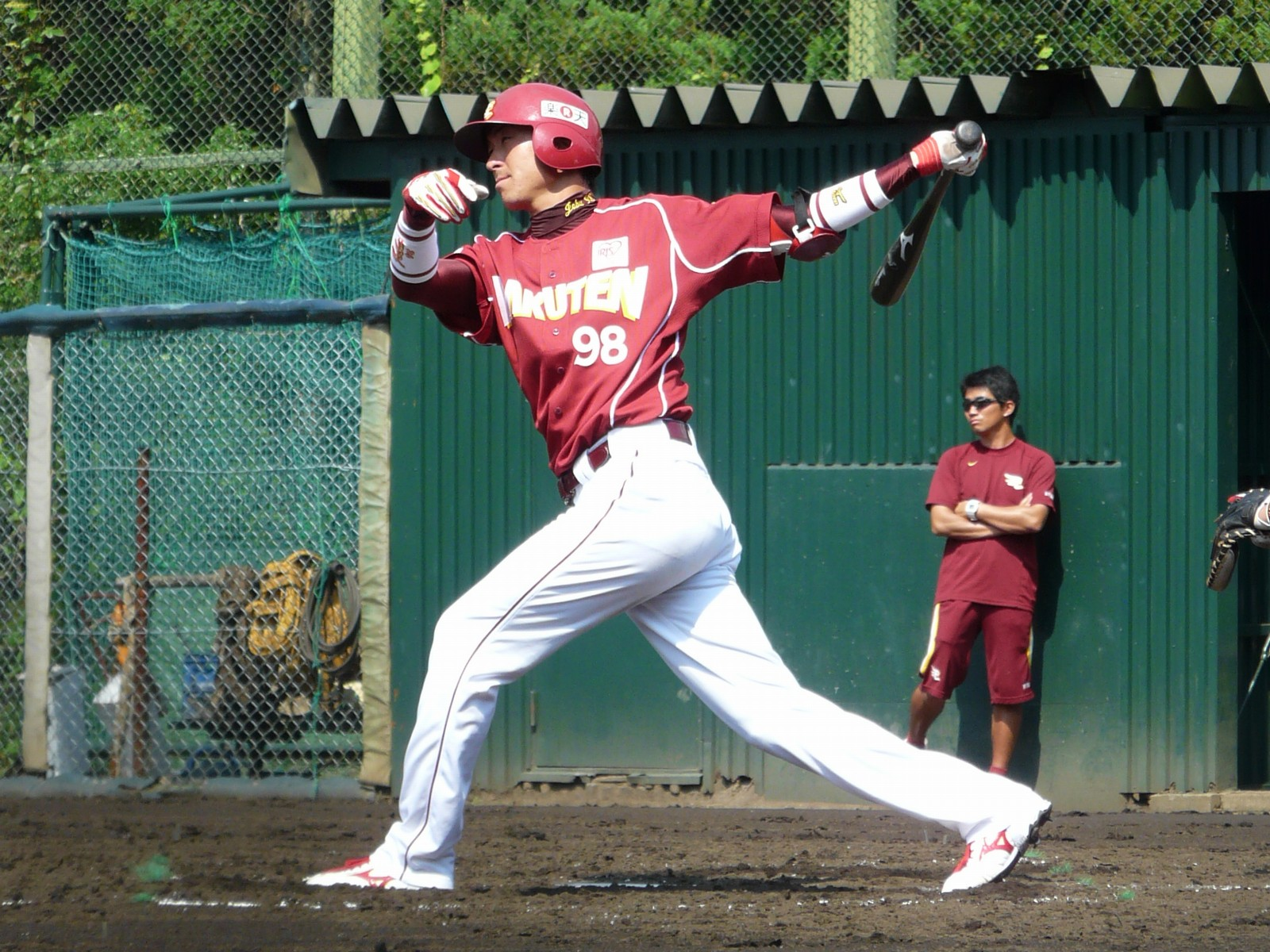
- Utility player
- Born: November 29, 1980 (age 45); Tsukuba, Ibaraki Japan
- Batted: Right Threw: Right

debut
- 2009, for the Tohoku Rakuten Golden Eagles

Last appearance
- 2011, for the Tohoku Rakuten Golden Eagles

Career statistics
- Batting average: .222
- Home runs: 0
- RBI: 4

Teams
- Tohoku Rakuten Golden Eagles (2008 – 2011)

Jobu Morita (森田 丈武, Morita Jōbu; born November 29, 1980) is a former baseball utility player who played for the Tohoku Rakuten Golden Eagles of Nippon Professional Baseball from 2009 to 2011.

Morita attended Yamanashi Gakuindai Fuzoku High School. Before playing professionally in Japan, Morita played for the Elmira Pioneers of the independent Northeast League in 2004, hitting .271 with 55 hits in 68 games. He returned to Elmira - now of the Can-Am Association - for 2005, and hit .263 with 65 hits in 71 games. During his time with Elmira, he played all over the diamond, but spent considerable time at second base and in the outfield. Overall, he hit .267 with 120 hits in 139 games.

He joined the Kagawa Olive Guyners of the independent Shikoku-Kyūshū Island League in 2006, where he remained through 2008. The Golden Eagles took him as their first pick in the 2008 developmental draft. He made his NPB debut in 2009, hitting .300 with 6 hits (including 4 doubles) in 9 games. He played a total of four games with the Golden Eagles in 2010 and 2011 and went hitless in 7 at-bats. Overall, he hit .222 with 6 hits in 13 games.
