= Takayuki Takaguchi =

Japanese baseball player and coach (born 1983)

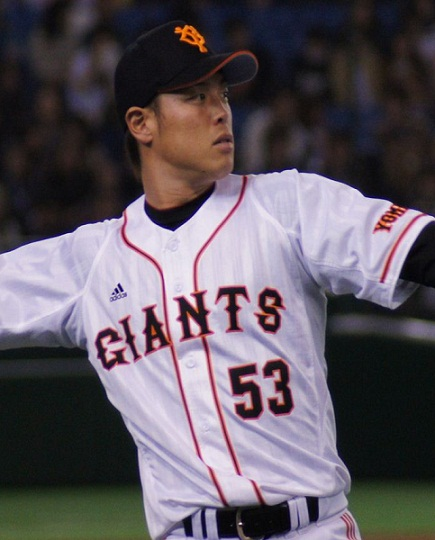
- Shortstop / Coach
- Born: August 23, 1983 (age 42); Edogawa, Tokyo, Japan
- Batted: Right Threw: Right

NPB debut
- September 30, 2007, for the Hokkaido Nippon-Ham Fighters

Last NPB appearance
- August 22, 2013, for the Yomiuri Giants

NPB statistics
- Batting average: .177
- Home runs: 2
- RBI: 19
- Stats at Baseball Reference

Teams
- As player: Hokkaido Nippon-Ham Fighters (2007–2010); Chiba Lotte Marines (2011); Yomiuri Giants (2012–2013); As coach: Orix Buffaloes (2020–2021)

Takayuki Takaguchi (高口 隆行, born August 23, 1983, in Edogawa, Tokyo) is a Japanese former professional baseball shortstop in Japan's Nippon Professional Baseball. He played for the Hokkaido Nippon-Ham Fighters from 2007 to 2010, the Chiba Lotte Marines in 2011 and for the Yomiuri Giants in 2012 and 2013. He later coached with the Orix Buffaloes in 2020 and 2021.
