= Tomoyuki Oda =

Japanese baseball player and coach (born 1979)

Hokkaido Nippon Ham Fighters – No. 75
- Infielder / Coach
- Born: May 19, 1979 (age 47); Hamamatsu, Shizuoka, Japan
- Batted: Left Threw: Right

NPB debut
- October 1, 2001, for the Nippon-Ham Fighters

Last NPB appearance
- October 10, 2009, for the Hokkaido Nippon-Ham Fighters

NPB statistics
- Batting average: .274
- Hits: 221
- RBIs: 88
- Stolen bases: 5
- Stats at Baseball Reference

Teams
- As player: Nippon-Ham Fighters/Hokkaido Nippon-Ham Fighters (1998–2009); As coach: Hokkaido Nippon-Ham Fighters (2013–2021, 2024-present)
- Last updated on: October 9, 2026

Tomoyuki Oda (小田 智之, Oda Tomoyuki; born May 19, 1979 in Hamamatsu, Shizuoka, Japan) is a former Nippon Professional Baseball infielder and the current coach of the Hokkaido Nippon-Ham Fighters.
