= Kensuke Tanaka =

Japanese baseball player (born 1981)

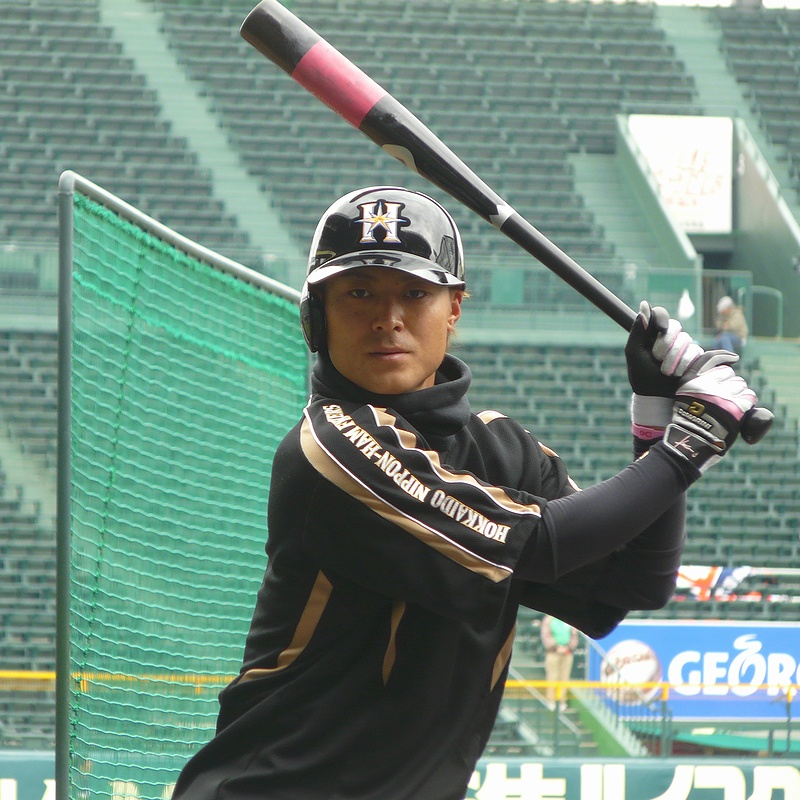
- Tanaka with the Hokkaido Nippon-Ham Fighters in 2012
- Second baseman / Left fielder
- Born: May 20, 1981 (age 45); Fukuoka, Japan
- Batted: Left Threw: Right

Professional debut
- NPB: 2000, for the Hokkaido Nippon-Ham Fighters
- MLB: July 9, 2013, for the San Francisco Giants

Last appearance
- NPB: 2019, for the Hokkaido Nippon-Ham Fighters
- MLB: July 28, 2013, for the San Francisco Giants

NPB statistics
- Batting average: .282
- Home runs: 46
- Runs batted in: 462

MLB statistics
- Batting average: .267
- Home runs: 0
- Runs batted in: 2
- Stats at Baseball Reference

Teams
- Nippon-Ham Fighters/Hokkaido Nippon-Ham Fighters (2000–2012); San Francisco Giants (2013); Hokkaido Nippon-Ham Fighters (2015–2019)

Career highlights and awards
- 2× Japan Series champion (2006, 2016)

Kensuke Tanaka (田中 賢介, born May 20, 1981) is a Japanese former professional baseball second baseman and left fielder. He played in Nippon Professional Baseball (NPB) for the Hokkaido Nippon-Ham Fighters, and in Major League Baseball (MLB) for the San Francisco Giants.

== Career ==
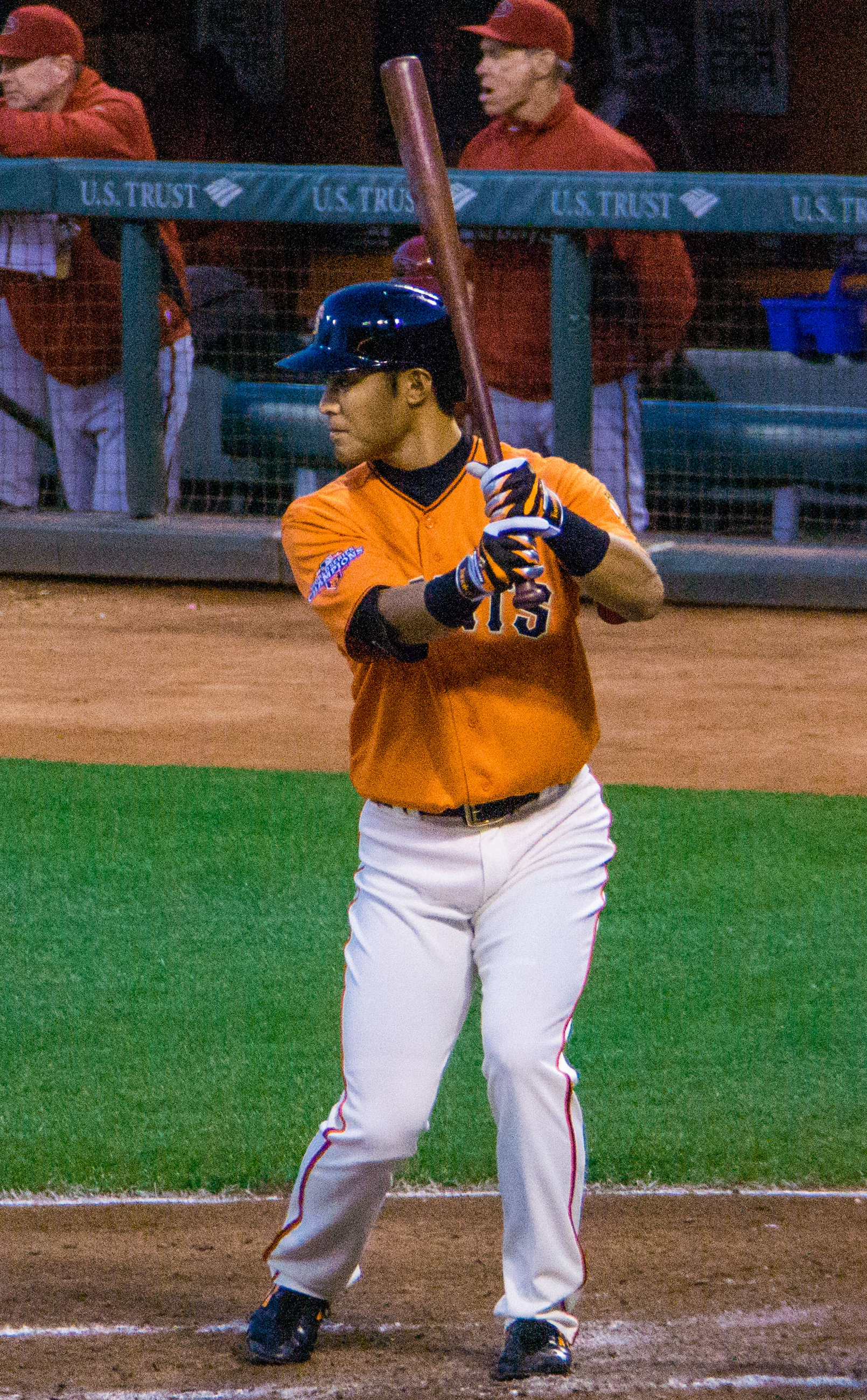
Tanaka batting for the San Francisco Giants in 2013

=== Hokkaido Nippon-Ham Fighters ===
Tanaka played for the Hokkaido Nippon-Ham Fighters of Nippon Professional Baseball (NPB) from 2000 through 2012.

=== San Francisco Giants ===
Tanaka made his Major League debut with the San Francisco Giants, in left field, on July 9, 2013, against the New York Mets despite playing almost exclusively second base with the Hokkaido Nippon-Ham Fighters and the Giants' Triple–A affiliate, the Fresno Grizzlies. He was designated for assignment by San Francisco on September 3, and released the next day.

=== Texas Rangers ===
Tanaka signed a minor league contract with the Texas Rangers on December 20, 2013. He played in 62 games for the Triple–A Round Rock Express in 2014, batting .258/.340/.371 with four home runs, 27 RBI, and 12 stolen bases. Tanaka was released by the Rangers organization on July 20, 2014.

== Personal life ==
Tanaka is married to Japanese Sapporo TV reporter Chiho Nishimori (西森千芳).
