= Takayuki Kanamori =

Japanese baseball player

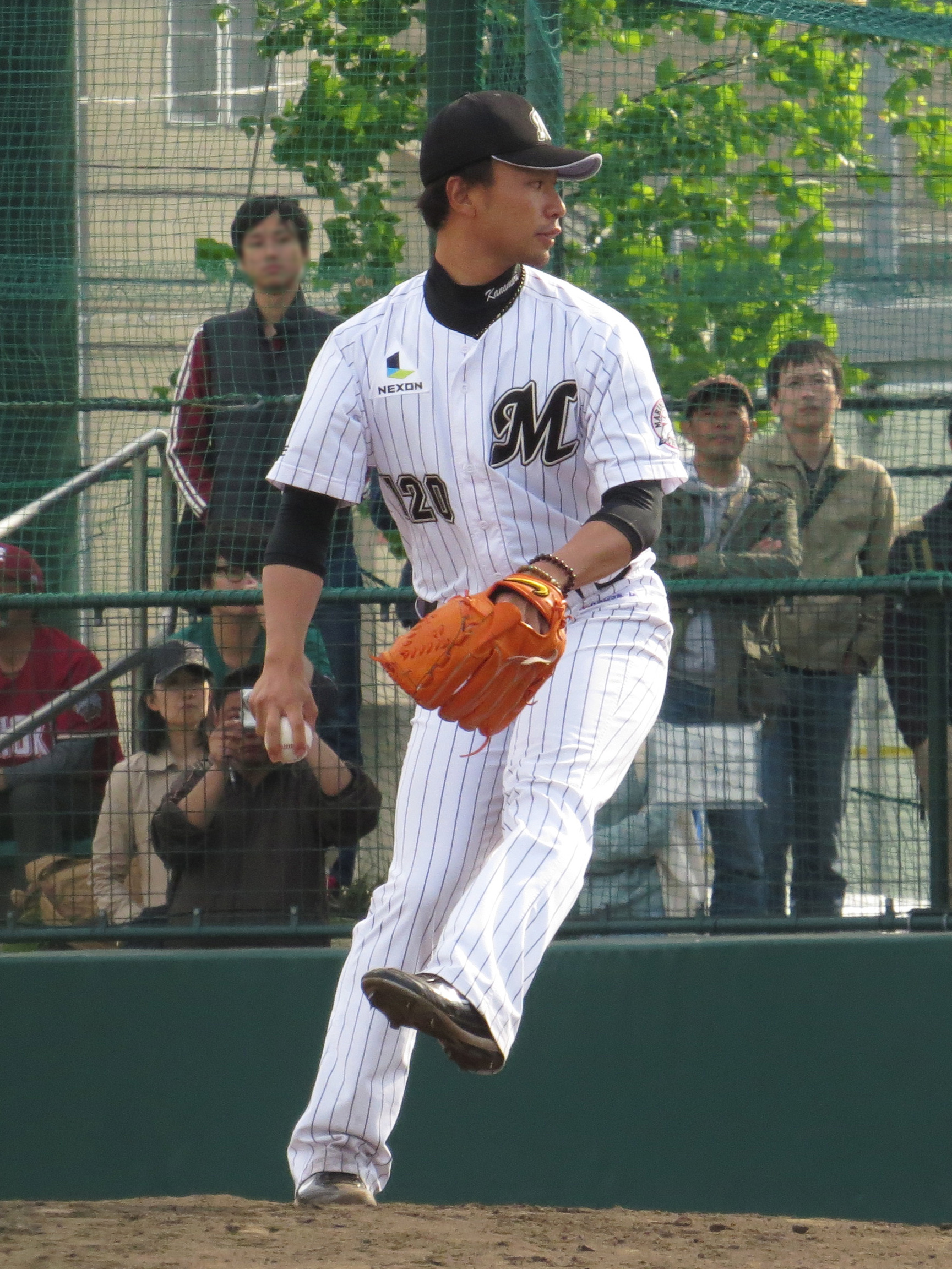
- Kanamori with the Chiba Lotte Marines
- Pitcher
- Born: July 24, 1985 (age 40)
- Bats: Right Throws: Right

NPB debut
- 2007, for the Hokkaido Nippon-Ham Fighters

NPB statistics (through 2016)
- Win–loss record: 6–3
- ERA: 4.92
- Strikeouts: 68
- Stats at Baseball Reference

Teams
- Hokkaido Nippon-Ham Fighters (2007–2010); Chiba Lotte Marines (2014–2016)

Takayuki Kanamori (金森 敬之, born July 24, 1985, in Fujiidera, Osaka) is a Japanese former professional baseball pitcher. He played for the Hokkaido Nippon-Ham Fighters from 2007 to 2010 and the Chiba Lotte Marines from 2013 to 2016.
