= Eiichi Koyano =

Japanese baseball player (born 1980)

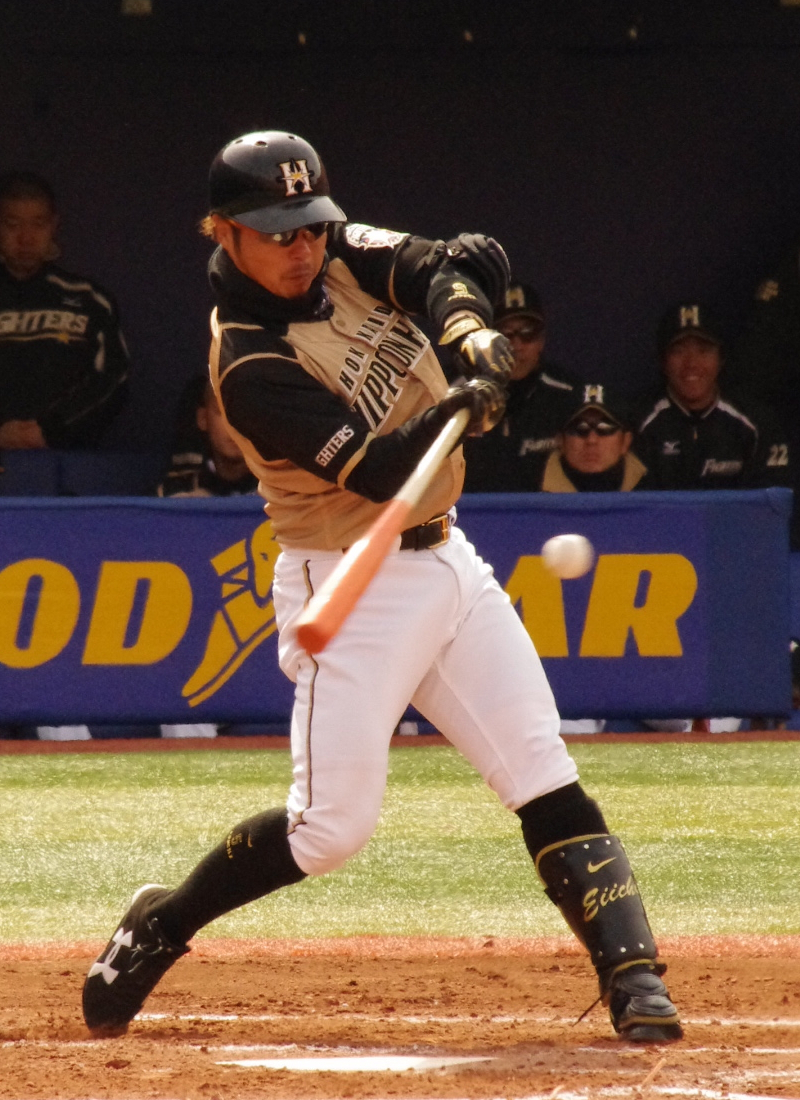
- Koyano with the Hokkaido Nippon Ham Fighters

Hanshin Tigers – No. 83
- Third baseman, First baseman, Left fielder, Batting coach
- Born: October 10, 1980 (age 46); Edogawa, Tokyo, Japan
- Batted: Right Threw: Right

NPB debut
- September 25, 2003, for the Nippon-Ham Fighters

Last NPB appearance
- October 5, 2018, for the Orix Buffaloes

NPB statistics
- Batting average: .264
- Home runs: 71
- Hits: 1,260
- Run batted ins: 566
- Stats at Baseball Reference

Teams
- As player: Nippon Ham Fighters/Hokkaido Nippon Ham Fighters (2003–2014); Orix Buffaloes (2015–2018); As coach: Tohoku Rakuten Golden Eagles (2019); Orix Buffaloes (2020-2024); Hanshin Tigers (2025-present)

Career highlights and awards
- 1× Leader of RBI in Pacific League (2010); 1× Pacific League Best Nine Award (2010); 3× Pacific League Golden Glove Award (2009-2010, 2012); 1× Japan Series champion (2006)

Eiichi Koyano (小谷野 栄一, Koyano Eīchi; born October 10, 1980) is a Japanese former professional baseball player (infielder) and currently the hitting coach for the Hanshin Tigers of Nippon Professional Baseball (NPB). He is a native of Edogawa, Tokyo, Japan. Koyano is considered a member of the Matsuzaka Generation.
