= Tatsuhito Katoh =

Japanese baseball player

- Pitcher
- Born: August 11, 1976 (age 49); Yoshinogawa, Tokushima, Japan
- Bats: Left Throws: Left

debut
- July 27, 2001, for the Nippon-Ham Fighters

NPB statistics (through 2005)
- Win–loss record: 3-5
- ERA: 3.99
- Strikeouts: 106

Teams
- Nippon-Ham Fighters/Hokkaido Nippon-Ham Fighters (2001–2005)

Tatsuhito Katoh (加藤 竜人, Katō Tatsuhito; born August 11, 1976 in Yoshinogawa, Tokushima, Japan) is a former professional Japanese baseball player.
