= Masato Kobayashi (baseball) =

Japanese baseball player

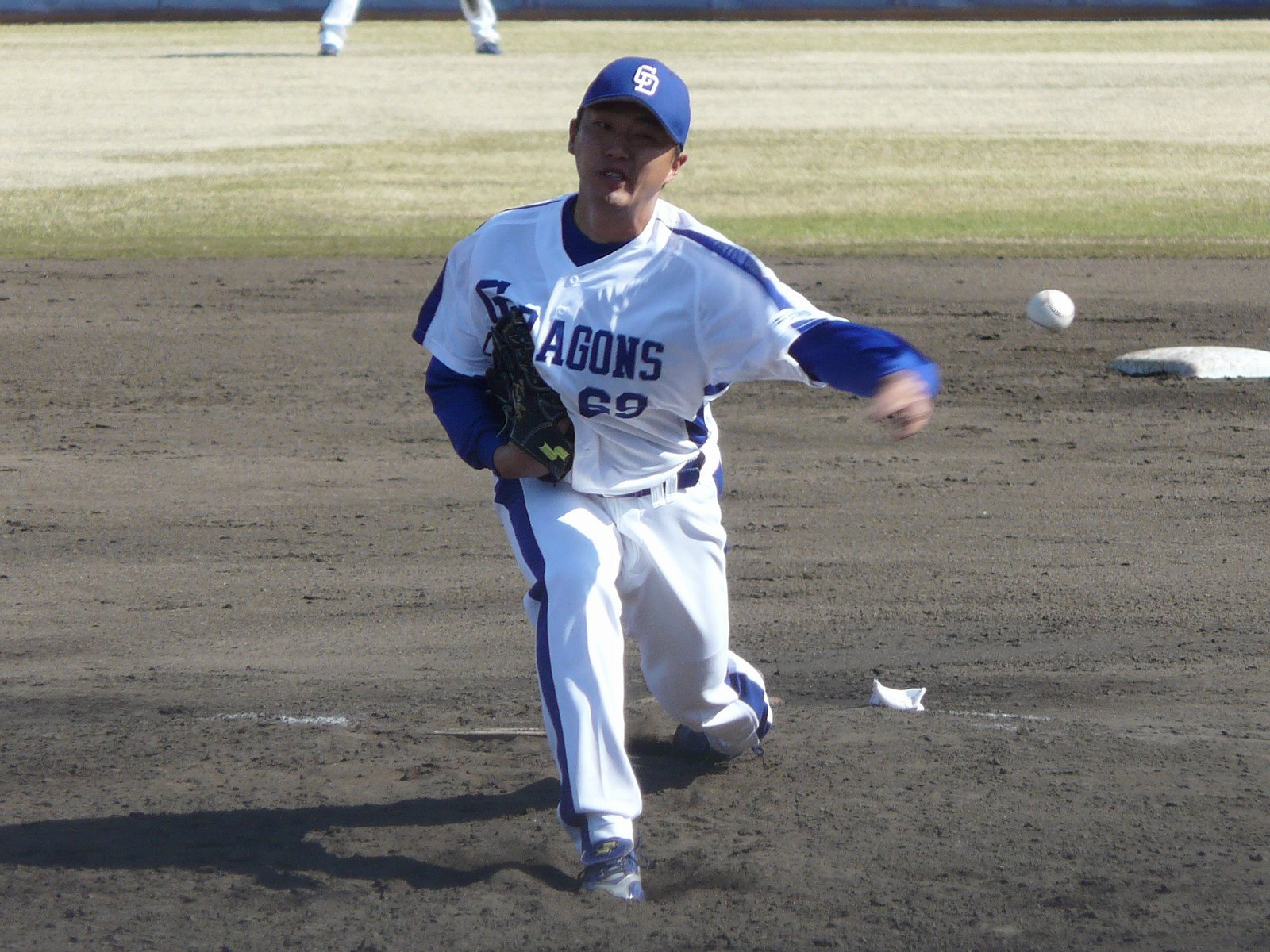

Chunichi Dragons – No. 86
- Pitcher / Coach
- Born: August 21, 1980 (age 45); Tsumagoi, Gunma Prefecture
- Batted: Left Threw: Left

NPB debut
- September 1, 2005, for the Chunichi Dragons

Last NPB appearance
- October 1, 2014, for the Chunichi Dragons

NPB statistics (through 2014)
- Win–loss record: 11-4
- ERA: 2.90
- Strikeouts: 134
- Saves: 1
- Holds: 62
- Stats at Baseball Reference

Teams
- As player: Chunichi Dragons (2003–2014); As coach: Chunichi Dragons (2025–Present)

Masato Kobayashi (小林 正人, Kobayashi Masato; born August 21, 1980 in Tsumagoi, Gunma, Japan) is a Japanese former professional baseball pitcher. Kobayashi played for the Chunichi Dragons in Japan's Nippon Professional Baseball from 2005 to 2014. He is currently a development coach for the Chunichi Dragons farm team.
