= Yusuke Kawasaki =

Japanese baseball player

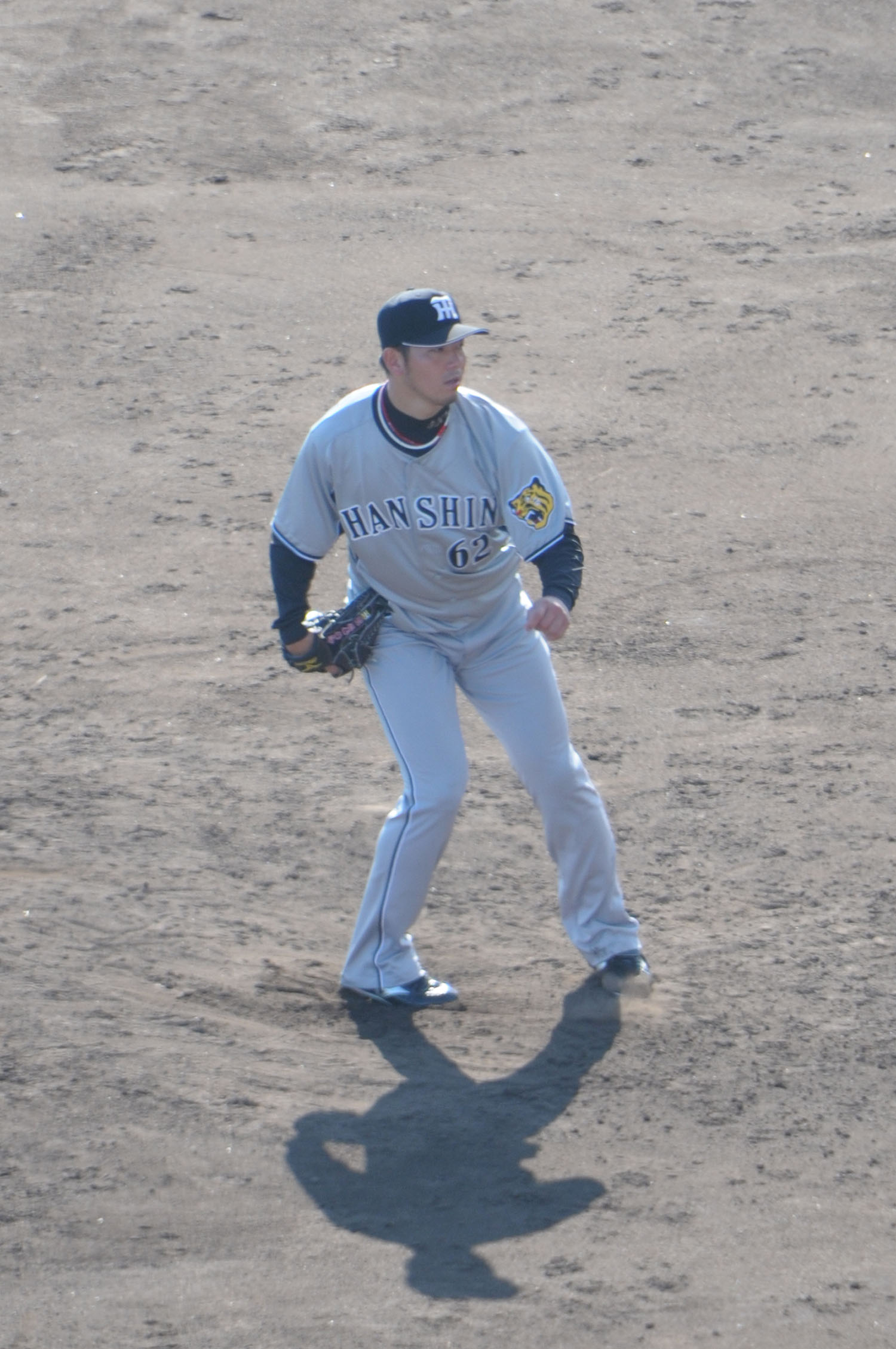
- Pitcher
- Born: February 17, 1982 (age 43); Miyazaki, Japan
- Bats: Left Throws: Left

debut
- April 19, 2006, for the Chiba Lotte Marines

Career statistics (through 2013 season)
- WHIP: 3.000
- ERA: 9.00
- SO: 2

Teams
- Chiba Lotte Marines (2006–2010); Hanshin Tigers (2010–2013); Saitama Seibu Lions (2013–2014)

Yusuke Kawasaki (川崎 雄介, Kawasaki Yūsuke) is a Japanese professional baseball pitcher. He was born on February 17, 1982, in Miyazaki, Japan. He is currently playing for the Saitama Seibu Lions of the NPB.
