= Tatsuo Kinoshita =

Japanese baseball player

Tatsuo Kinoshita 木下 達生
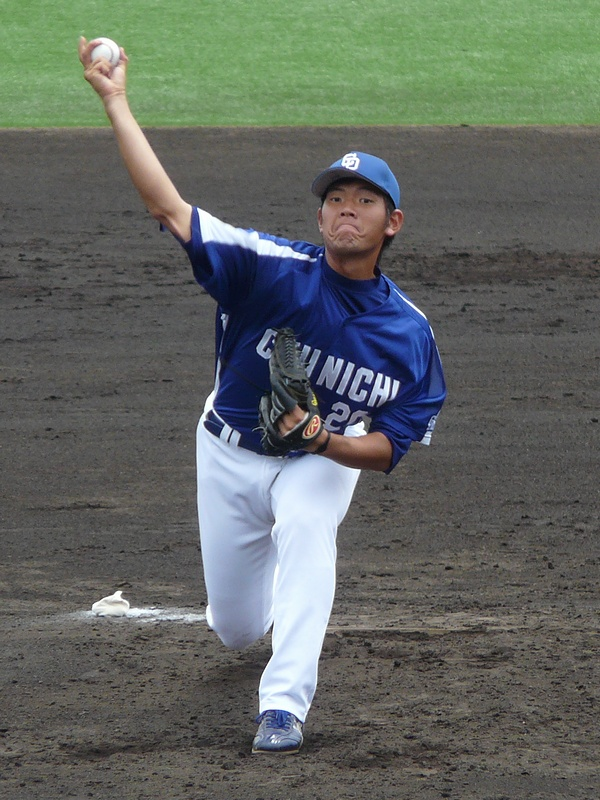
- Pitcher
- Born: November 28, 1987 (age 38); Nagoya, Japan
- Bats: Right Throws: Right

NPB debut
- August 6, 2006, for the Hokkaido Nippon-Ham Fighters
- Stats at Baseball Reference

Teams
- Hokkaido Nippon-Ham Fighters (2006–2007); Chunichi Dragons (2011)

Tatsuo Kinoshita (木下 達生, born November 28, 1987) is a Japanese former professional baseball pitcher in Nippon Professional Baseball. He played for the Hokkaido Nippon-Ham Fighters in 2006 and 2007 and the Chunichi Dragons in 2011.
