= Satoru Kanemura =

Japanese baseball player and coach

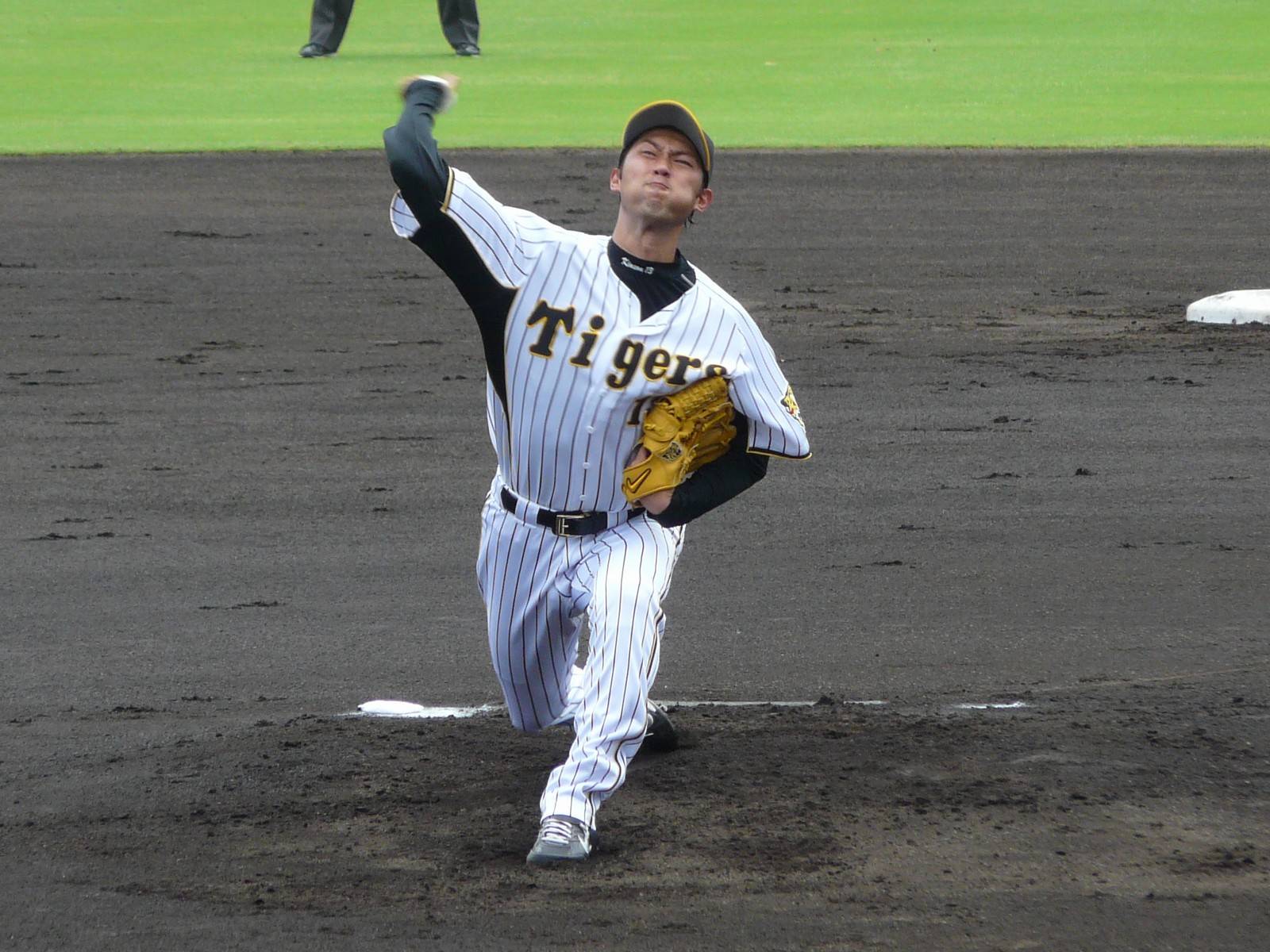

Lotte Giants – No. 81
- Pitcher / Coach
- Born: April 19, 1976 (age 50); Kesennuma, Miyagi, Japan
- Batted: Right Threw: Right

NPB debut
- 1995, for the Nippon Ham Fighters

Last NPB appearance
- 2010, for the Hanshin Tigers

NPB statistics
- Win–loss: 89-81
- Strikeouts: 662
- ERA: 3.89
- Stats at Baseball Reference

Teams
- As player: Nippon-Ham Fighters/Hokkaido Nippon-Ham Fighters (1995–2007); Hanshin Tigers (2008–2010); Shinano Grandserows (2011); As coach: Hanshin Tigers (2016–2022, 2025); Lotte Giants (2026-present)

Career highlights and awards
- 1× Pacific League ERA Champion (1998); 1× Japan Series champion (2006); 3× NPB All-Star selection (1998, 2004, 2005)

Satoru Kanemura (金村 曉, Kanemura Satoru) is a Japanese former professional baseball pitcher.

Kanemura pitched for the Hokkaido Nippon-Ham Fighters during Game 4 when they won the 2006 Japan Series against the Chunichi Dragons.
