= Hichori Morimoto =

Japanese baseball player of Korean descent

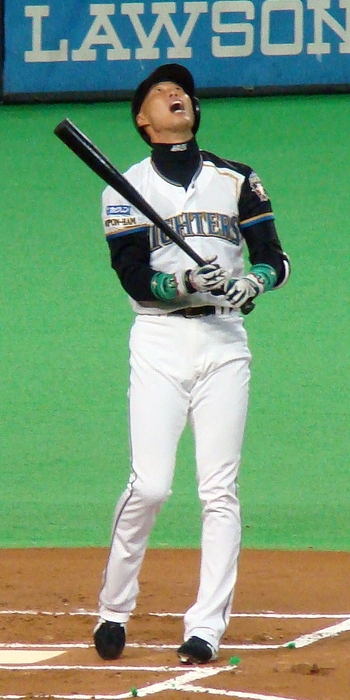
- Morimoto with the Hokkaido Nippon Ham Fighters (2009)

Hokkaido Nippon Ham Fighters – No. 80
- Outfielder / Coach
- Born: January 31, 1981 (age 44); Tokyo, Japan
- Batted: Right Threw: Right

NPB debut
- August 2, 2000, for the Nippon Ham Fighters

Last NPB appearance
- September 27, 2015, for the Saitama Seibu Lions

NPB statistics (through 2015 season)
- Batting average: .259
- Hits: 904
- RBIs: 267

Teams
- As player: Nippon Ham Fighters/Hokkaido Nippon Ham Fighters (1999 – 2010); Yokohama BayStars/Yokohama DeNA BayStars (2011 – 2013); Saitama Seibu Lions (2014 – 2015); As coach: Hokkaido Nippon-Ham Fighters (2023 - )
- Last updated on: Nov 18, 2022

Hichori Morimoto (Japanese: 森本 稀哲, Korean: 이희철, Hanja: 李稀哲, born January 31, 1981) is a Japanese professional baseball player of Korean descent for the Saitama Seibu Lions. He was the number 4 draft pick for the Fighters in 1999. For years, he was the backup for the most popular player in the league, Tsuyoshi Shinjo. After the 2006 season in which the Fighters won the Japan Series, SHINJO (registered name with capital letters) announced his retirement, in which Morimoto then took over SHINJO's center field spot, and also his number 1 (Morimoto had worn number 46 when SHINJO was playing). Morimoto has alopecia areata, an autoimmune disease that causes loss of body hair.
