= Takahito Kudo =

Japanese baseball player (born 1981)

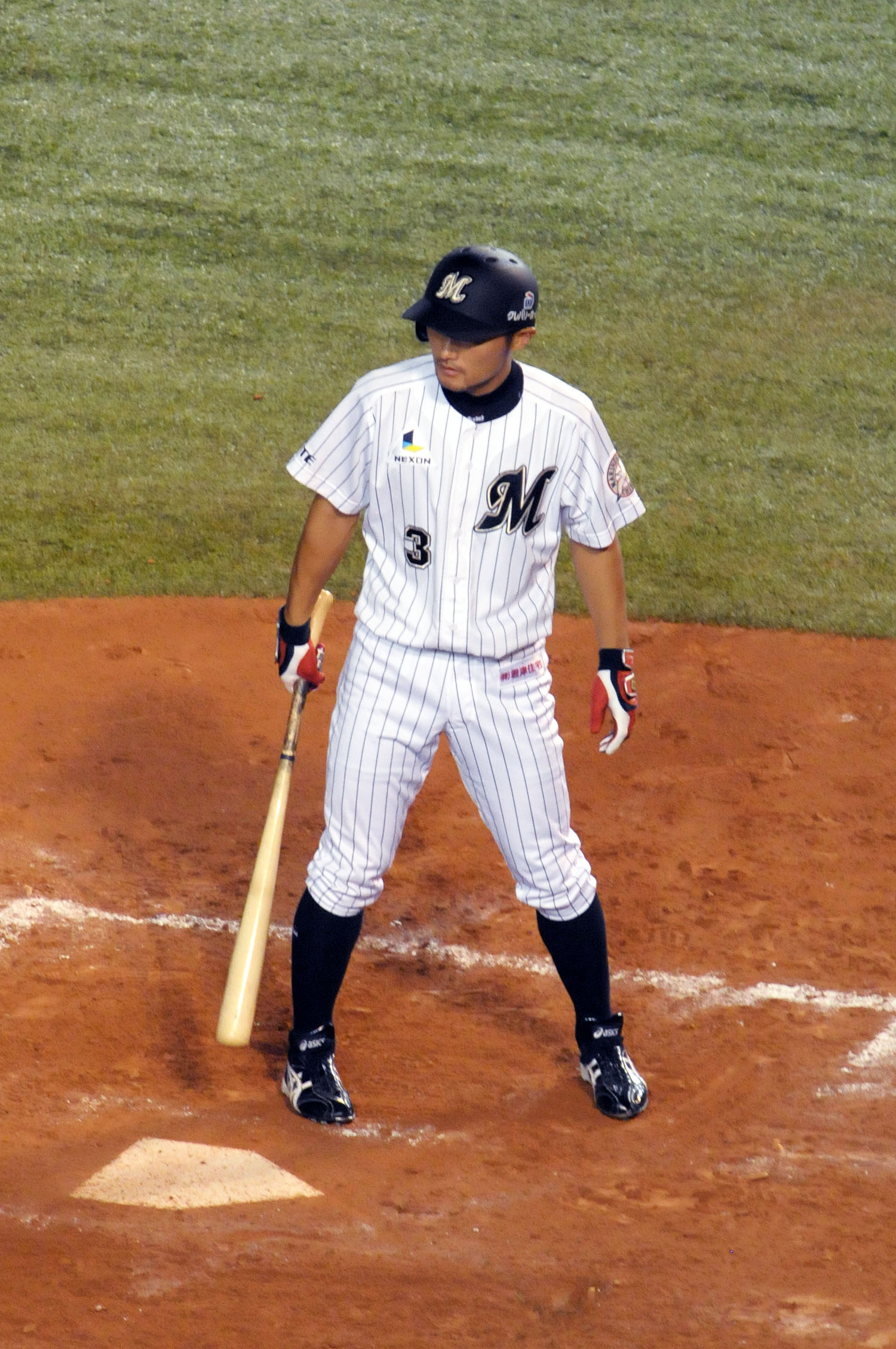

Hanshin Tigers – No. 76
- Outfielder/Outfield Coach
- Born: March 30, 1981 (age 45); Kuroishi, Aomori
- Bats: Left Throws: Left

NPB debut
- September 22, 2005, for the Hokkaido Nippon-Ham Fighters

NPB statistics (through 2016)
- Batting average: .258
- Hits: 185
- RBIs: 48
- Stats at Baseball Reference

Teams
- As player: Hokkaido Nippon-Ham Fighters (2005–2008); Yomiuri Giants (2009–2011); Chiba Lotte Marines (2011–2013); Chunichi Dragons (2014–2018); As coach: Chunichi Dragons (2019 – 2021); Hanshin Tigers (2022-present)

Career highlights and awards
- 2009 Japan Series champion
- Last updated on: February 11, 2022

Takahito Kudo (工藤 隆人, Kudo Takahito; born March 30, 1981 in Kuroishi, Aomori) is a retired Nippon Professional Baseball player. He played for the Hokkaido Nippon-Ham Fighters, Yomiuri Giants, Chiba Lotte Marines and Chunichi Dragons over a 14-year professional career.
