= Tomoyuki Kubota =

Japanese baseball player

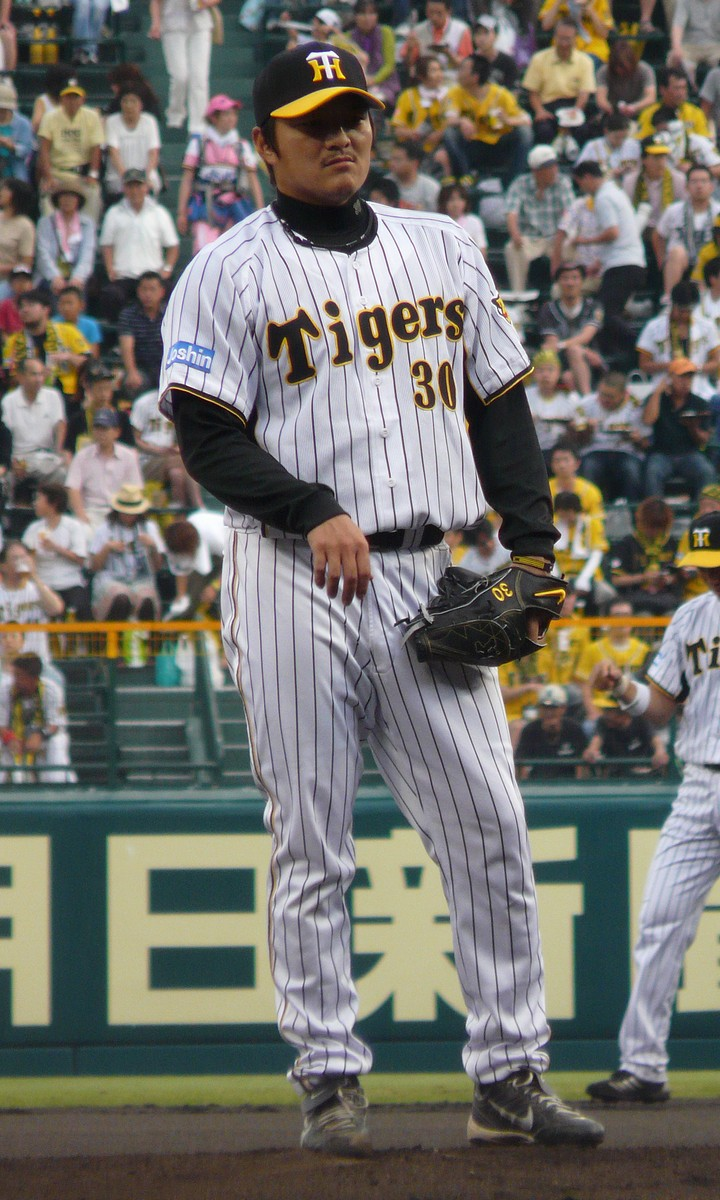

Hanshin Tigers – No. 90
- Pitcher / Coach
- Born: January 30, 1981 (age 45); Yoshimi, Saitama, Japan
- Batted: Right Threw: Right

NPB debut
- May 11, 2003, for the Hanshin Tigers

Last NPB appearance
- September 28, 2013, for the Hanshin Tigers

NPB statistics
- Win–loss record: 41–34
- Earned run average: 3.16
- Strikeouts: 612

Teams
- As player: Hanshin Tigers (2003–2014); As coach: Hanshin Tigers (2021–present)

Career highlights and awards
- 2× Central League Most Valuable Setup Pitcher (2007, 2008)
Medals
Representing Japan
Men's baseball
World Baseball Classic
Gold medal – first place	2006 San Diego	Team

Tomoyuki Kubota (久保田 智之; born January 30, 1981) is a Japanese pitcher for the Hanshin Tigers in Japan's Nippon Professional Baseball. He was selected as a member in the 2006 World Baseball Classic.
