= Toshimasa Konta =

Japanese baseball player (born 1980)

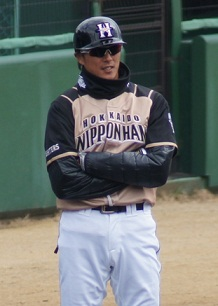

Hokkaido Nippon Ham Fighters – No. 76
- Outfielder / Coach
- Born: August 12, 1980 (age 45); Tonami, Toyama, Japan
- Batted: Left Threw: Right

NPB debut
- September 30, 2003, for the Nippon-Ham Fighters

Last NPB appearance
- June 5, 2011, for the Yomiuri Giants

NPB statistics (through 2012 season)
- Batting average: .249
- Hits: 97
- RBIs: 22
- Stolen bases: 31
- Stats at Baseball Reference

Teams
- As player: Nippon-Ham Fighters/Hokkaido Nippon-Ham Fighters (2003–2010, 2012); Yomiuri Giants (2011); As coach: Hokkaido Nippon-Ham Fighters (2013–present)
- Last updated on: September 24, 2018

Toshimasa Konta (紺田 敏正, Konta Toshimasa; born August 12, 1980 in Tonami, Toyama, Japan) is a former Nippon Professional Baseball outfielder and the current coach of the Hokkaido Nippon-Ham Fighters.
