= Kawahara =

Kawahara (written: 川原, 河原 or かわはら in hiragana) is a Japanese surname. Notable people with the surname include:

- Hiroyuki Kawahara (川原 弘之, born 1991), Japanese baseball player
- Kazuhisa Kawahara (河原 和寿, born 1987), Japanese footballer
- Kazune Kawahara, Japanese manga artist
- Keiga Kawahara (川原慶賀, 1786–1860?), Japanese painter
- Masatoshi Kawahara (川原 正敏, born 1960), Japanese manga artist
- Masayuki Kawahara (川原 正行, born 1956), Japanese speed skater
- Nozomi Kawahara (born 1970), Japanese golfer
- Reki Kawahara (川原 礫, born 1974), Japanese writer
- Sarah Kawahara, Canadian figure skater and choreographer
- Satoru Kawahara (河原 智), Japanese table tennis player
- Shigeto Kawahara (川原 繁人, born 1980), Japanese linguist
- Shugo Kawahara (川原 周剛, born 1980), Japanese footballer
- Tatsuya Kawahara (footballer) (川原 達也, born 1985), Japanese footballer
- Yumiko Kawahara (川原 由美子, born 1960), Japanese manga artist

== See also ==
- Kawahara Station, a railway station in Yazu District, Tottori Prefecture, Japan
- Kawahara Shrine, a Shinto shrine in Nagoya, Japan
- Kawahara, Tottori, a former town in Yazu District, Tottori, Japan
