= Keisuke Katto =

Japanese baseball player

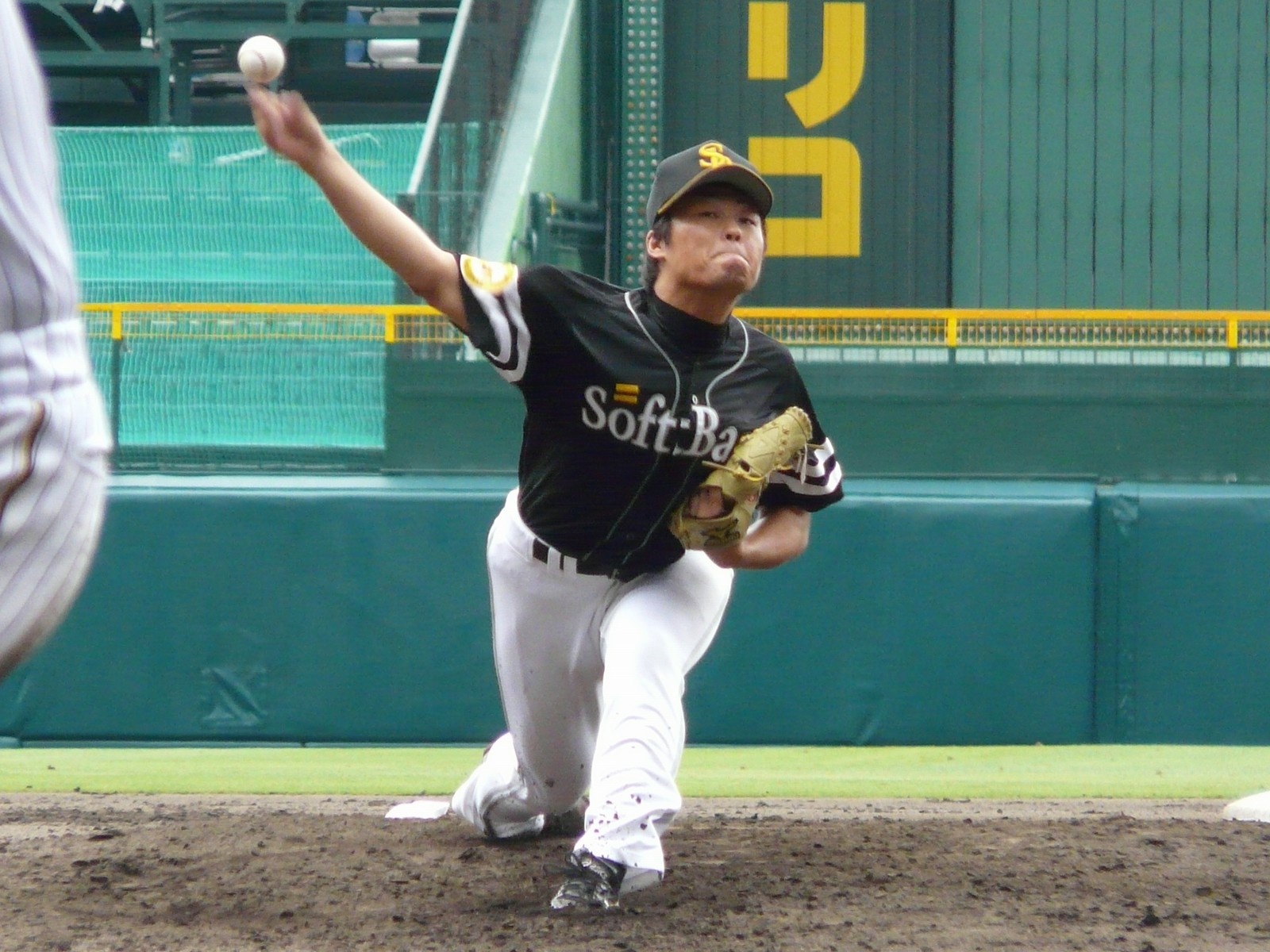
- Pitcher
- Born: November 12, 1983 (age 42)
- Bats: Right Throws: Right

NPB debut
- 2007, for the Fukuoka SoftBank Hawks

NPB statistics (through 2012)
- Win–loss record: 2–2
- ERA: 3.23
- Strikeouts: 94
- Stats at Baseball Reference

Teams
- Fukuoka SoftBank Hawks (2007–2013); Orix Buffaloes (2013–2014)

Keisuke Katto (甲藤 啓介) was born November 12, 1983. He is a Japanese former professional baseball pitcher in Japan's Nippon Professional Baseball. He played for the Fukuoka SoftBank Hawks from 2007 to 2012.
