= Tomoyuki Uchiyama =

Japanese baseball player

- Pitcher
- Born: August 15, 1968 (age 56); Minokamo-gun, Gifu Japan
- Batted: Left Threw: Right

debut
- 1992, for the Seibu Lions

Last appearance
- 1997, for the Fukuoka Daiei Hawks

Career statistics
- Pitching record: 15-21
- ERA: 4.32
- Strikeouts: 221

Teams
- Seibu Lions (1992 – 1993); Fukuoka Daiei Hawks (1994 – 1997)

Tomoyuki Uchiyama (born August 15, 1968) is a former pitcher who played for the Seibu Lions and Fukuoka Daiei Hawks of Nippon Professional Baseball from 1992 to 1997.

Born in Minokamo-gun, Gifu Japan, Uchiyama attended Minokamo High School and then Osaka Keio University prior to playing in NPB. With Seibu in 1992, he was 0-1 with a 3.00 ERA in 11 relief appearances and in 1993, also with the Lions, he went 3-4 with a 3.01 ERA in 31 games (six starts), allowing only 62 hits in 83 2/3 innings pitched.

From 1994 to 1997, he played for the Hawks. In 1994, he went 6-11 with three complete games a 5.22 ERA in 24 games (22 starts), walking 31 batters in 112 frames. In 1995, he was 2-3 with a 4.83 ERA in 14 games (11 starts) and in 1996, he went 3-2 with a 4.33 mark in 28 games (six starts). To finish his NPB career, he was 1-0 with a 4.71 ERA in 17 relief appearances in 1997.

Overall, Uchiyama was 15-21 with a 4.32 ERA in 125 games (45 starts) over six seasons in NPB. In 373 innings, he allowed 389 hits, walked 128 batters and had 221 strikeouts.

For the 1998 campaign, he pitched for the Reading Phillies in the Philadelphia Phillies organization. In 43 games (five starts), he was 5-6 with a 3.94 ERA. In 118 2/3 innings, he allowed 129 hits and 49 walks while striking out 96 batters.
