= Shingo Tatsumi =

Japanese baseball player

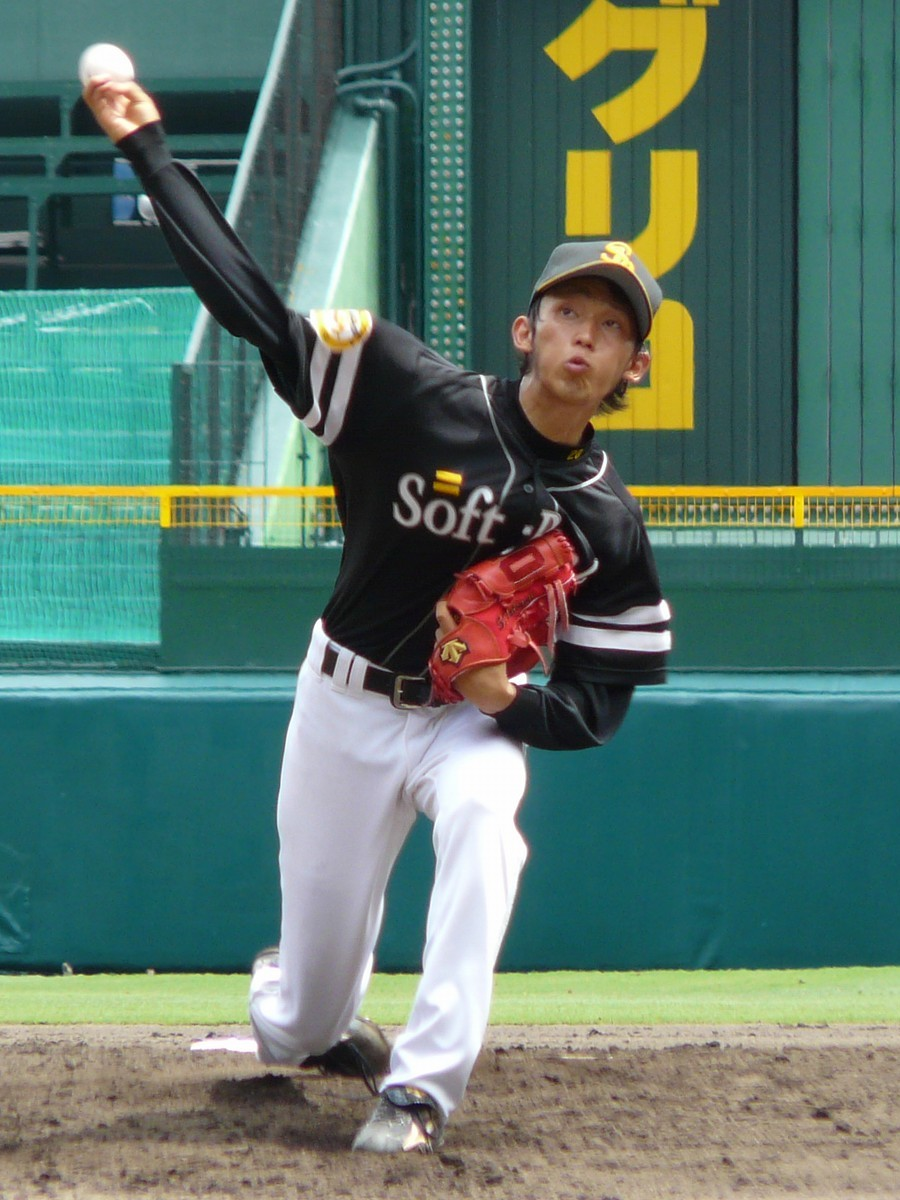
- Tatsumi with the Fukuoka SoftBank Hawks
- Pitcher
- Born: January 10, 1987 (age 39)
- Bats: Right Throws: Right

NPB debut
- 2007, for the Fukuoka SoftBank Hawks

NPB statistics (through 2015)
- Win–loss record: 1–4
- ERA: 7.50
- Strikeouts: 39
- Stats at Baseball Reference

Teams
- Fukuoka SoftBank Hawks (2009–2015)

Shingo Tatsumi (巽 真悟, born January 10, 1987, in Higashimuro District, Wakayama) is a Japanese former professional baseball pitcher in Japan's Nippon Professional Baseball. He played for the Fukuoka SoftBank Hawks from 2009 to 2015.
