= Hiroyuki Mori =

Japanese baseball player (born 1965)

Fukuoka SoftBank Hawks – No. 022
- Catcher / Coach
- Born: February 4, 1965 (age 61); Sennan, Osaka, Japan
- Batted: Right Threw: Right

NPB debut
- October 11, 1987, for the Nankai Hawks

Last appearance
- July 28, 1990, for the Fukuoka Daiei Hawks

NPB statistics
- Batting average: .108
- Home runs: 2
- Run batted in: 6

Teams
- As player: Nankai Hawks / Fukuoka Daiei Hawks (1987–1991); As coach and manager: Fukuoka Daiei Hawks / Fukuoka SoftBank Hawks (1993–2002, 2009–2012, 2017–present)

Career highlights and awards
- As coach: Japan Series champion (2025)

Hiroyuki Mori (森浩之, Mori Hiroyuki; born February 4, 1965) is a Japanese former professional baseball catcher, and current the battery coordinator for the Fukuoka SoftBank Hawks of Nippon Professional Baseball (NPB).

He previously played for the Nankai / Fukuoka Daiei Hawks. His registered name during his active career was 森 広之(Mori Hiroyuki).

== Early baseball career ==
Mori went on to PL Gakuen High School, where he won the Japanese High School Baseball Invitational Tournament in the springs of his sophomore and junior years.

He won the Japan National Collegiate Baseball Championship as a senior at Toyo University and was captain of the 1986 USA vs. Japan Collegiate All-Star Series.

== Professional career ==
=== Active player era ===
On November 20, 1986, Mori was drafted by the Nankai Hawks in the 1986 Nippon Professional Baseball draft.

He was active for only five seasons, totaling 28 games, four hits, six runs batted in, and a .108 batting average.

=== After retirement ===
Mori began his experience as a bullpen catcher in the 1992 season, served as the coach in charge of the bullpen from the 1993 season to 2002, and was a noncoaching bullpen from the 2003 season to the 2008 season.

He also served as the coach in the second squad in the charge of the bullpen again from the 2009 to 2012 seasons and as a scorer from the 2013 to 2016 seasons.

He then served as the first squad operations coach for the 2017-2018 season, the first squad head coach for the 2019 to 2020 season, the third squad manager for the 2021 season, the first squad head coach again for the 2022 season.

On December 2, 2023, he was transferred to the fourth squad battery coordinator.

Mori has served the team as a coach and team staff since his retirement to the present.
