= Masahiro Sakumoto =

Japanese baseball player and coach

- Pitcher / Coach
- Born: July 15, 1974; Nakagami, Okinawa, Japan
- Batted: Left Threw: Left

NPB debut
- April 2, 1996, for the Fukuoka Daiei Hawks

Last appearance
- June 4, 2006, for the Yokohama BayStars

NPB statistics (through 2007)
- Win–loss record: 19-24
- Earned Run Average: 4.67
- Strikeouts: 222
- Saves: 4

Teams
- As player: Fukuoka Daiei Hawks (1996–2002); Hanshin Tigers (2003–2005); Yokohama BayStars (2006–2007); As coach: Fukuoka SoftBank Hawks (2015–2024)

Career highlights and awards
- 1× Japan Series champion (1999)
- Last updated on: 3 December 2024

Masahiro Sakumoto (佐久本 昌広, Sakumoto Masahiro; born July 15, 1974) is a Japanese former Nippon Professional Baseball pitcher, and current the third squad pitching coach for the Fukuoka SoftBank Hawks of Nippon Professional Baseball (NPB).

He previously played for the Fukuoka Daiei Hawks, the Hanshin Tigers, and the Yokohama BayStars.

== Professional career ==
=== Active player era ===
On November 22, 1995, Sakumoto was drafted fourth round pick by the Fukuoka Daiei Hawks in the 1995 Nippon Professional Baseball draft.

Sakumoto had been active as a setup man since his rookie year, pitched in 73 games in the 1996 and 1997 seasons.

In 1998 season, Sakumoto pitched as a starting pitcher and recorded a record of 6-2 win–loss record and a one Saves.

He played seven seasons with the Hawks, but was traded to the Hanshin Tigers exchange to Masashi Matsuda in the off-season of 2002.

He pitched in only 10 games in three seasons with the Tigers and was released in the off-season of 2005.

In 2006 season, Sakumoto transferred to the Yokohama BayStars and pitched in 21 games as a relief pitcher, recorded 0–0 win–loss record, and an ERA of 3.86.

In 2007 season, Sakumoto announced his retirement.

Sakumoto pitched in 183 games in 11 seasons overall, compiling with a 19–24 win–loss record, a 4 saves, and a 4.67 ERA.

=== After retirement ===
After his retirement, Sakumoto worked as a team staff member for the Yokohama BayStars from the 2008 season to the 2011 season and served as a batting practice pitcher.

After that, he worked as a company employee in his hometown of Okinawa until 2014.

On November 7, 2014, Sakumoto was appointed as the third squad pitching coach of the Fukuoka SoftBank Hawks.

He served as the fourth squad pitching coach starting in the 2023 season.

On December 2, 2023, Sakumoto was transferred to the third squad pitching coach.
