= Shotaro Ide =

Japanese baseball player (born 1983)

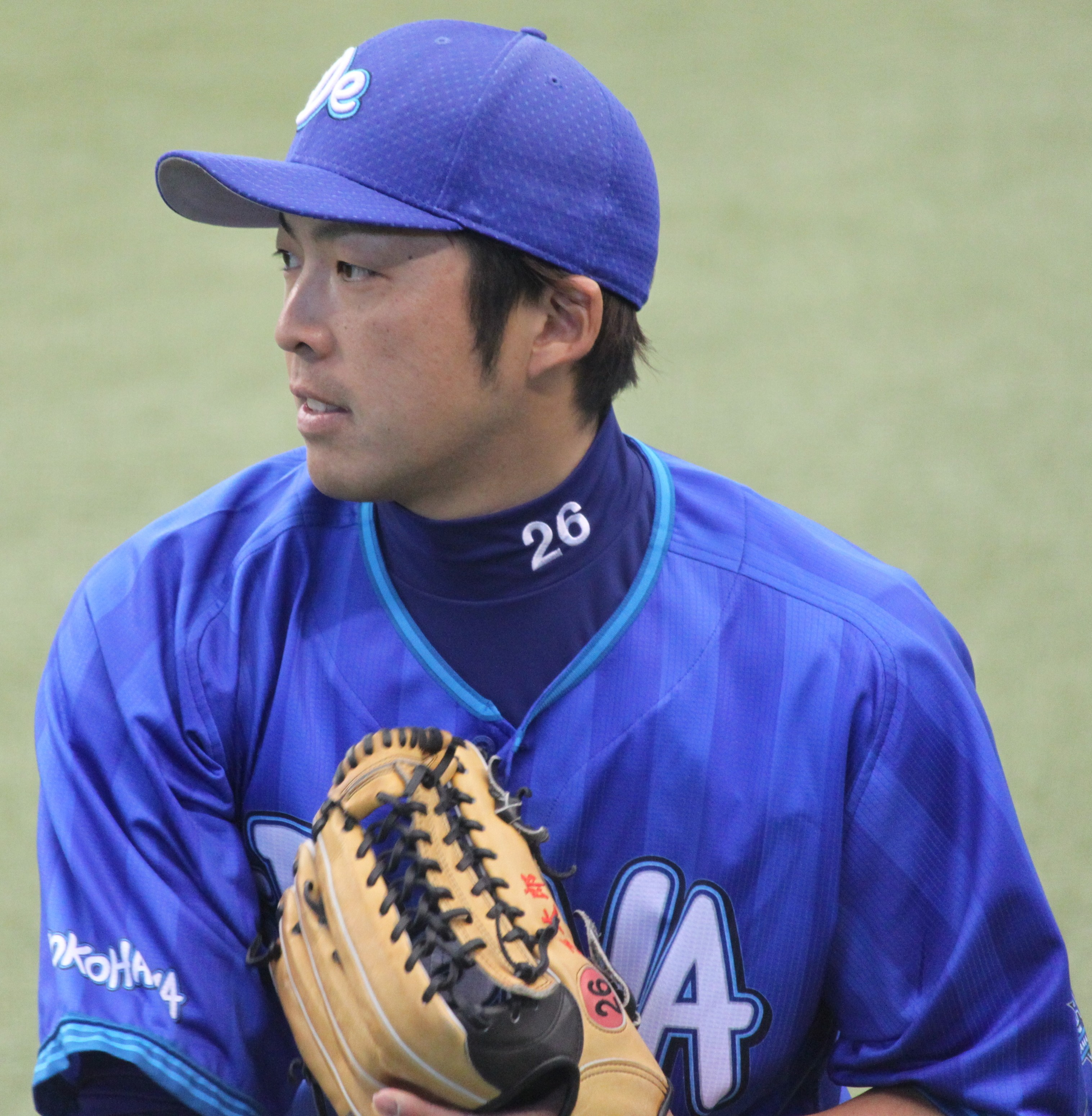
- Ide with the Yokohama DeNA BayStars

Ryukyu Blue Oceans
- Outfielder
- Born: October 10, 1983 (age 42); Nishimorokata District, Miyazaki, Japan
- Bats: Right Throws: Left

debut
- March 27, 2004, for the Fukuoka Daiei Hawks
- Stats at Baseball Reference

Teams
- As player: Fukuoka SoftBank Hawks/Fukuoka Daiei Hawks (2002–2010); Yokohama BayStars/Yokohama DeNA BayStars (2010–2016); As coach: Ryukyu Blue Oceans (2020-present)

Shotaro Ide (井手 正太郎, Ide Shotaro; born October 10, 1983 in Nishimorokata District, Miyazaki, Japan) is a retired professional Japanese baseball player. He played for the Fukuoka SoftBank Hawks and the Yokohama DeNA BayStars. He is currently the hitting coach for the Ryukyu Blue Oceans.
