= Ryo Yoshimoto =

Japanese baseball player and coach (born 1980)

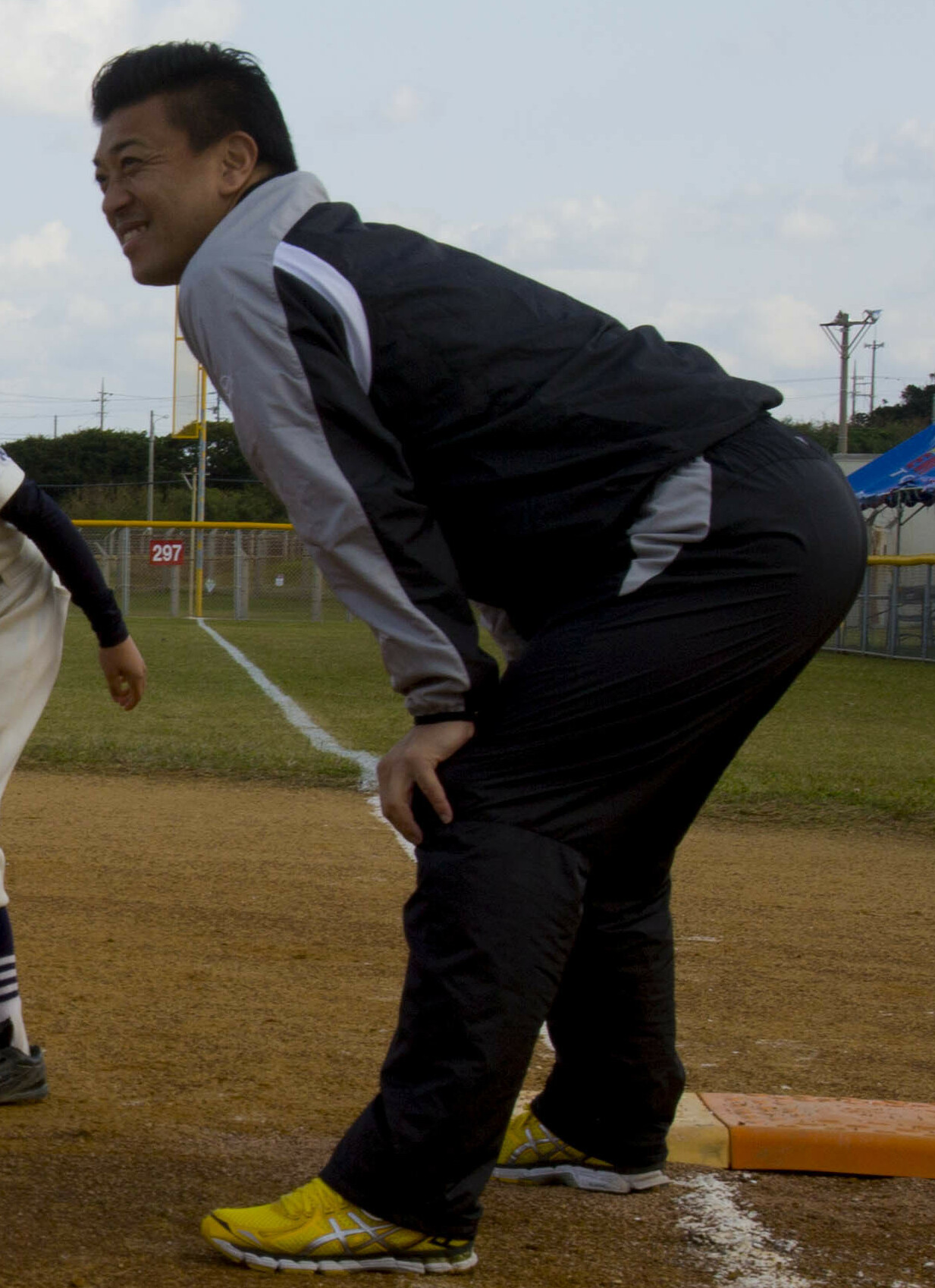
- Yoshimoto in 2017
- Infielder / Coach
- Born: May 8, 1980; Uki, Kumamoto, Japan
- Batted: Right Threw: Right

NPB debut
- September 30, 2001, for the Fukuoka Daiei Hawks

Last appearance
- July 3, 2010, for the Tokyo Yakult Swallows

NPB statistics (through 2011)
- Batting average: .227
- Hits: 54
- Home runs: 1
- Runs batted in: 34
- Stolen base: 1
- Stats at Baseball Reference

Teams
- As player: Fukuoka Daiei Hawks / Fukuoka SoftBank Hawks (1999–2008); Tokyo Yakult Swallows (2009–2011); As coach: Fukuoka SoftBank Hawks (2018–2024)

Ryo Yoshimoto (吉本 亮, Yoshimoto Ryo; born May 8, 1980) is a Japanese former Nippon Professional Baseball infielder, and current second squad hitting coach for the Fukuoka SoftBank Hawks of Nippon Professional Baseball (NPB). He previously played for the Fukuoka Daiei Hawks and the Tokyo Yakult Swallows.

== Early baseball career ==
Yoshimoto went on to Kyushu Gakuin High School, where he participated in the 80th Japanese High School Baseball Championship in the summer of his junior year with Hisashi Takayama, a year below him.

== Professional career ==
=== Active player era ===
On November 20, 1998, Yoshimoto was drafted by the Fukuoka Daiei Hawks in the 1998 Nippon Professional Baseball draft.

He played only 95 games in his 10 seasons with the Hawks. And he became a free agent in the offseason of 2008 and moved to the Tokyo Yakult Swallows in the 2009 season.

He played 54 games in three seasons with the Swallows but decided to retire as a free agent after the 2011 season.

Yoshimoto had a total of 149 games played as an active player with a .227 batting average, 54 hits, one home run, and 34 RBI.

=== After retirement ===
Yoshimoto served on the team operations staff of the Fukuoka SoftBank Hawks from the 2012-2017 season and became the hitting coach for the third squad in the 2018 season.

He has served as second squad hitting coach since the 2022 season, and the first squad hitting coach since the 2023 season.

On December 2, 2023, he was transferred to the second squad hitting coach.
