= Ryuma Kidokoro =

Japanese baseball player (born 1985)

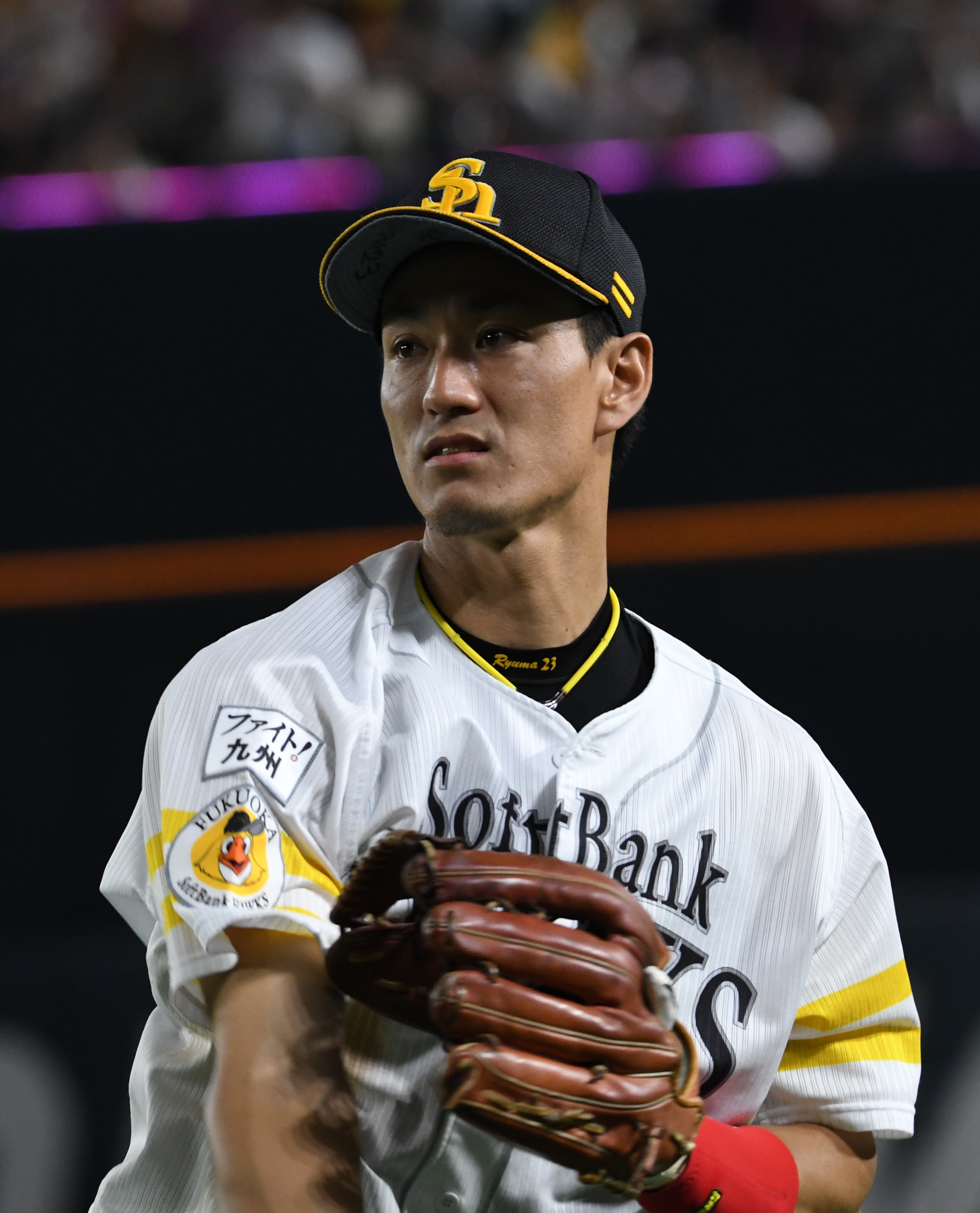
- Kidokoro with the Fukuoka SoftBank Hawks.

Fukuoka SoftBank Hawks – No. 96
- Outfielder / Coach
- Born: September 24, 1985 (age 40); Ichinomiya, Aichi, Japan
- Batted: Left Threw: Right

NPB debut
- August 30, 2005, for the Fukuoka SoftBank Hawks

Last NPB appearance
- June 15, 2018, for the Fukuoka SoftBank Hawks

NPB statistics
- Batting average: .196
- Home runs: 8
- Run batted in: 42
- Stolen bases: 65
- Stats at Baseball Reference

Teams
- As player: Fukuoka Daiei Hawks/Fukuoka SoftBank Hawks (2004–2018); As coach: Fukuoka SoftBank Hawks (2022–present)

Career highlights and awards
- As player: Interleague play (NPB) MVP (2016); 3× Japan Series champion (2011, 2014, 2017); As coach: Japan Series champion (2025)

Ryuma Kidokoro (城所 龍磨, Kidokoro Ryūma; born September 24, 1985) is a Japanese former professional baseball outfielder, and current second squad outfield defense and base running coach for the Fukuoka SoftBank Hawks of Nippon Professional Baseball (NPB). He played in NPB for the Hawks from 2004 to 2018.

== Professional career ==
On November 19, 2003, Kidokoro was drafted third round pick by the Fukuoka Daiei Hawks in the 2003 Nippon Professional Baseball draft.

Kidokoro contributed to the team for a long time as an outfielder and a baserunning specialist.

In the interleague play at 2016 season, Kidokoro was the batting leader with a batting average of .415. He had only hit one home run in his 12-season career, but he hit five home runs in 15 games in interleague play. He also recorded 12 RBI and 6 stolen bases, and was awarded the MVP of the interleague play.

Kidokoro played 14 seasons, appearing in 716 games and a batting average of .196, a 8 home runs, a 91 hits, a RBI of 42, a 65 stolen bases, and a 14 sacrifice bunts.

=== After retirement ===
Kidokoro had been working as a team staff member for the Fukuoka SoftBank Hawks since 2019.

On November 3, 2021, Kidokoro was appointed as the third squad outfield defense and base running coach of the Fukuoka SoftBank Hawks.

On December 2, 2023, he was transferred to the second squad outfield defense and base running coach.
