= Kim Mu-young =

South Korean baseball player

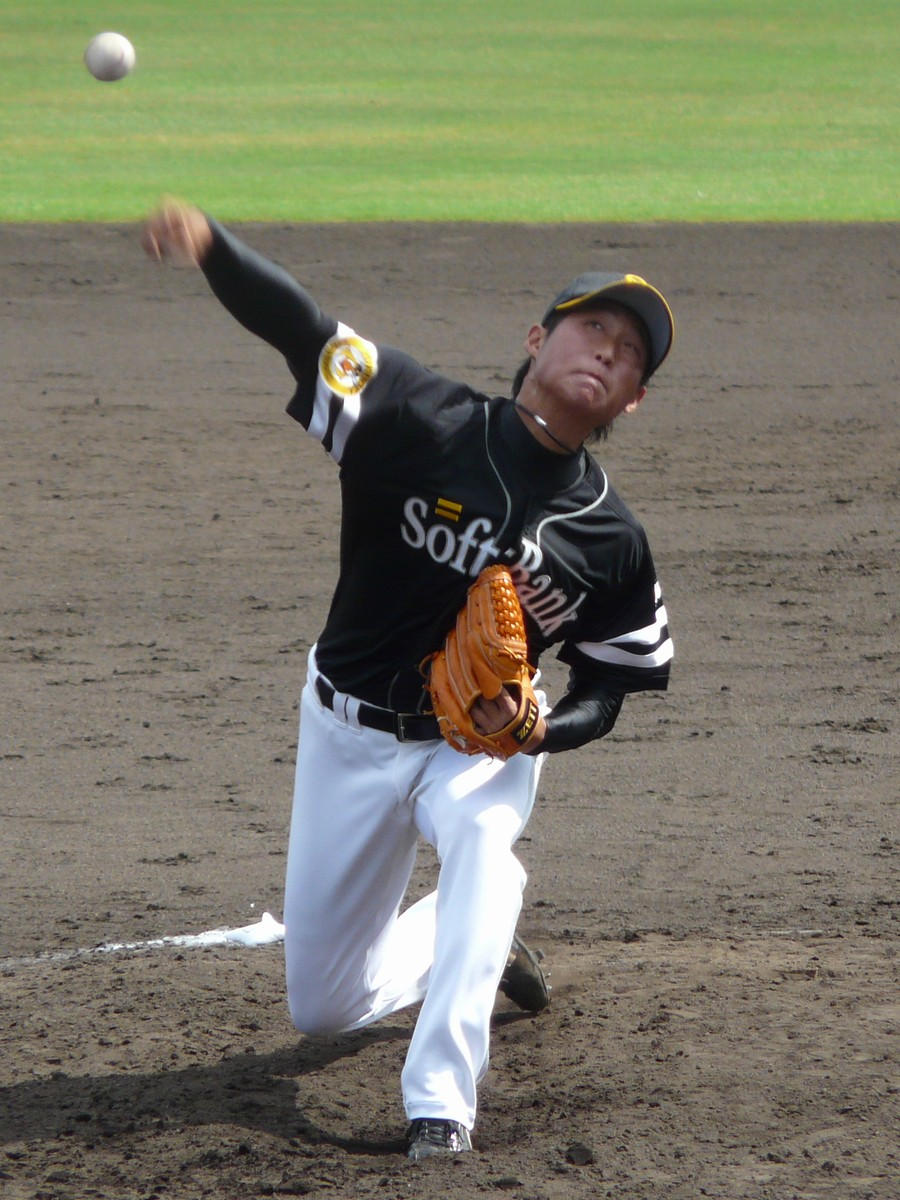
- Young with the Fukuoka SoftBank Hawks
- Pitcher
- Born: November 22, 1985 (age 39)
- Batted: Right Threw: Right

NPB debut
- July 17, 2009, for the Fukuoka SoftBank Hawks

Last NPB appearance
- April 29, 2016, for the Tohoku Rakuten Golden Eagles

NPB statistics
- Win–loss record: 2–2
- Earned run average: 2.88
- Strikeouts: 97

Teams
- Fukuoka SoftBank Hawks (2009, 2011–2014); Tohoku Rakuten Golden Eagles (2016)

Kim Mu-young (born November 22, 1985) is a South Korean former professional baseball pitcher in Japan's Nippon Professional Baseball. He played for the Fukuoka SoftBank Hawks in 2009 and from 2011 to 2014 and with the Tohoku Rakuten Golden Eagles in 2016.
