= Masato Okumura =

Japanese baseball player (born 1992)

Fukuoka SoftBank Hawks – No. 021
- Pitcher
- Born: August 14, 1992 (age 33); Nakatsu, Ōita, Japan
- Bats: Right Throws: Right

NPB debut
- March 29, 2019, for the Fukuoka SoftBank Hawks

NPB statistics
- Win–loss record: 0–1
- Earned run average: 4.73
- Strikeouts: 24

Teams
- As player: Fukuoka SoftBank Hawks (2019–2023); As coach: Fukuoka SoftBank Hawks (2024–present)

Career highlights and awards
- As coach: Japan Series champion (2025)

Masato Okumura (奥村 政稔, Okumura Masato; born August 14, 1992) is a Japanese former professional baseball pitcher, and current fourth squad pitching coach for the Fukuoka SoftBank Hawks of Nippon Professional Baseball (NPB). He played in NPB for the Hawks from 2019 to 2023.

== Early baseball career ==
In 2017, Okumura pitched in the 88th Intercity baseball tournament.

== Professional career ==
=== Active player era ===
On October 25, 2018, Okumura was drafted by the Fukuoka Softbank Hawks in the 2018 Nippon Professional Baseball draft.

On March 29, 2019, Okumura debuted in the Pacific League as a relief pitcher and recorded a Hold in the opening match of the 2019 season against the Saitama Seibu Lions. Since then, he has pitched in eight games, but on April 20, he hurt his right elbow and left the team for treatment. However, he returned to the team on August 17 and made a good pitching with no runs in two innings. In 2019 season, he recorded with a 12 Games pitched, a 0–0 Win–loss record, a 8.76 ERA, a 3 Holds, a 10 strikeouts in 12.1 innings.

In 2020 season, Okumura spent the first half of the season rehabilitating his right elbow, but returned on August 12 and scored one inning with no runs. And he recorded with a 5 Games pitched, a 2.08 ERA, a 7 strikeouts in 4.1 innings.

In 2021 season, he never had a chance to pitch in the Pacific League.

On August 29, 2022, he pitched his first start against the Orix Buffaloes and pitched five strong innings. He also pitched three scoreless innings against the Saitama Seibu Lions on September 13. However, the team announced that he injured his right elbow in a game against the Tohoku Rakuten Golden Eagles on September 16 and underwent surgery on September 30.

On November 13, 2022, since he is expected to spend the 2023 season in rehabilitation, the Hawks re-signed him as a developmental player at his current estimated salary of 9 million yen. November 27, he will change his uniform number from 61 to 126 beginning with the 2023 season, it was announced.

On October 31, 2023, Okumura announced that he would retire as an active player.

=== After retirement ===
On October 31, 2023, Okumura became the fourth squad pitching coach of the Fukuoka Softbank Hawks.
