= Ryo Hidaka =

Japanese baseball player

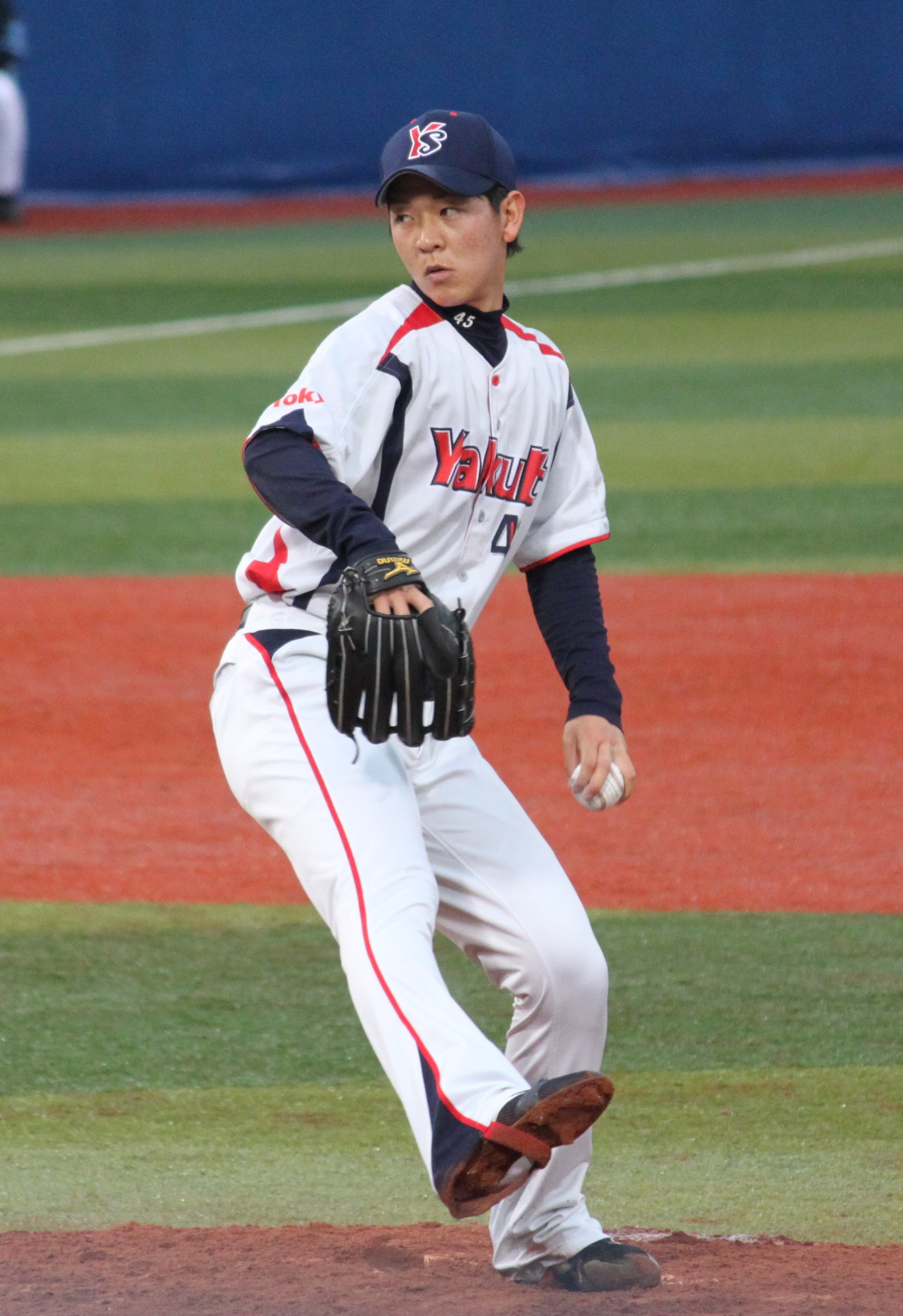
- Hidaka with the Tokyo Yakult Swallows
- Pitcher
- Born: July 19, 1990 (age 35); Saiki, Ōita, Japan
- Bats: Left Throws: Left

debut
- April 12, 2011, for the Tokyo Yakult Swallows
- Stats at Baseball Reference

Teams
- Tokyo Yakult Swallows (2009–2014); Fukuoka SoftBank Hawks (2014–2015)

Ryo Hidaka (日高 亮, Hidaka Ryō; born July 19, 1990 in Saiki, Ōita, Japan) is a professional Japanese baseball player.
