= Yuta Watanabe (baseball) =

Japanese baseball player (born 1991)

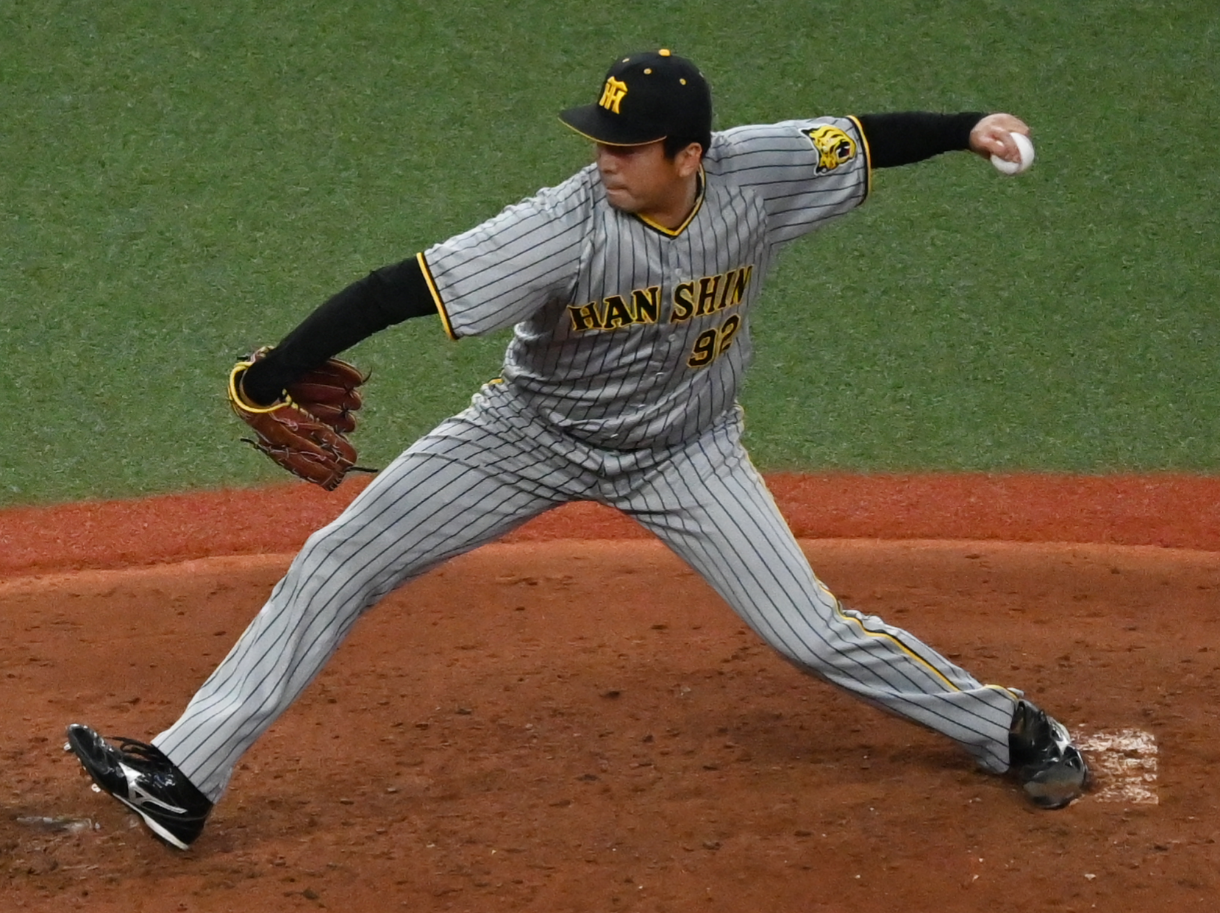
- Watanabe with the Hanshin Tigers

Hanshin Tigers – No. 92
- Pitcher
- Born: September 19, 1991 (age 34); Sanjō, Niigata, Japan
- Bats: Left Throws: Left
- NPB: September 4, 2020, for the Fukuoka SoftBank Hawks

NPB statistics (through 2022 season)
- Win–loss record: 3-1
- ERA: 2.63
- Holds: 11
- Strikeouts: 23
- Stats at Baseball Reference

Teams
- Fukuoka SoftBank Hawks (2018–2021); Hanshin Tigers (2022–present)

Yuta Watanabe (渡邉 雄大, Watanabe Yūta; born September 19, 1991) is a Japanese professional baseball pitcher for the Hanshin Tigers of Nippon Professional Baseball.

He previously played for the Fukuoka SoftBank Hawks.

== Professional career ==
=== Niigata Albirex BC ===
On December 6, 2013, Watanabe was drafted by the Niigata Albirex BC, who belongs to the Baseball Challenge League of the Independent baseball league.

In the 2014 season, Watanabe recorded 19 games pitched, a 7–2 win–loss record, a 2.91 ERA and 70 strikeouts in 87.1 innings.

In the 2015 season, Watanabe recorded 33 games pitched, a 6–3 win–loss record, a 2.91 ERA and 51 strikeouts in 87.1 innings.

In the 2016 season, Watanabe recorded 32 games pitched, a 3–1 win–loss record, a 2.70 ERA, one save and 37 strikeouts in 26.2 innings.

In the 2017 season, Watanabe recorded 46 games pitched, a 1–2 Win–loss record, a 1.29 ERA, 16 Saves and 66 strikeouts in 55.2 innings.

=== Fukuoka SoftBank Hawks ===
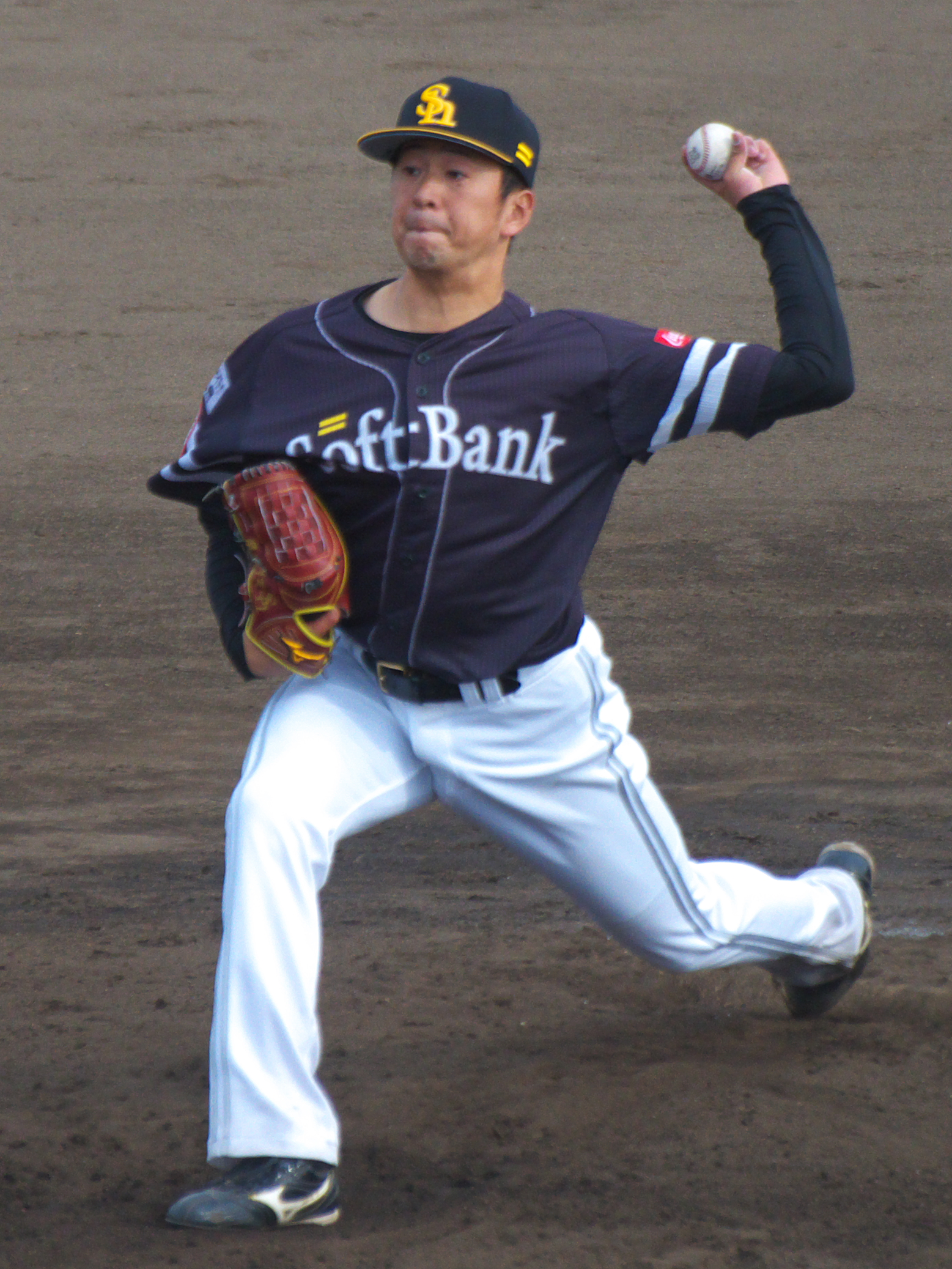
Watanabe with the Fukuoka SoftBank Hawks in 2019.

On October 26, 2017, Watanabe was drafted as a developmental player by the Fukuoka Softbank Hawks in the 2017 Nippon Professional Baseball draft.

From 2018 to 2019 season, he played in informal matches against the Shikoku Island League Plus's teams and amateur baseball teams, and played in the Western League of NPB second league.

On August 31, 2020, Watanabe signed a 6 million yen contract with the Fukuoka SoftBank Hawks as a registered player under control On September 4, he debuted in the Pacific League against the Chiba Lotte Marines as a relief pitcher. However, in the match against the Tohoku Rakuten Golden Eagles on September 9, he was replaced due to an accident on his left elbow. As a result, he spent the rest of the season rehabilitating his left elbow. In 2020 season, Watanabe pitched 3 games in the Pacific League.

In 2020 season, he was only able to pitch in six games due to an elbow injury. On October 18, 2021, the Hawks announced he was a free agent.

=== Hanshin Tigers ===
On December 9, 2021, the Hanshin Tigers announced that they have signed Watanabe as a developmental player.

On March 22, 2022, the Tigers re-signed him as a registered player under control. On May 1 against the Yomiuri Giants, he pitched as a relief pitcher and recorded his first win. In 2022 season, he finished the regular season with a 3-1 win–loss record, 10 holds, and a 2.45 ERA in 32 games pitched.
