= Koji Bonishi =

Japanese baseball player (born 1968)

- Catcher
- Born: December 30, 1968 (age 56); Tamano, Okayama, Japan
- Bats: Right Throws: Right

Teams
- Fukuoka Daiei Hawks (1991–2003)

Koji Bonishi (坊西 浩嗣, Bōnishi Kōji) (born December 30, 1968) is a former baseball player based in Japan. He played for the Fukuoka Daiei Hawks in the Japan Pacific League.
