= Takayoshi Eguchi =

Japanese baseball player

Hokkaido Nippon Ham Fighters – No. 92
- Pitcher / Coach
- Born: July 22, 1989 (age 36); Ogi, Saga, Japan
- Batted: Right Threw: Right

NPB debut
- September 11, 1991, for the Fukuoka Daiei Hawks

Last NPB appearance
- may 2, 1995, for the Fukuoka Daiei Hawks

NPB statistics
- Win–loss record: 0–1
- Earned run average: 4.50
- Strikeouts: 13
- Saves: 0

Teams
- As player: Fukuoka Daiei Hawks (1991–1996); As coach: Hokkaido Nippon-Ham Fighters (2025–present)

Takayoshi Eguchi (江口 孝義, Eguchi Takayoshi; born May 15, 1969) is a former baseball player from Japan. He later played in the Pacific League for the Fukuoka Daiei Hawks .
