= Takayuki Nishijima =

Japanese baseball player (born 1971)

- Outfielder
- Born: August 12, 1971 (age 54); Sunakawa, Hokkaido, Japan
- Batted: Left Threw: Left

NPB debut
- October 10, 1992, for the Fukuoka Daiei Hawks

Last appearance
- June 1, 1999, for the Fukuoka Daiei Hawks

NPB statistics
- Avg.: .189
- Games Played: 36
- Hits: 7
- RBI: 1

Teams
- Fukuoka Daiei Hawks (1992, 1995–1999)

Takayuki Nishijima (西島 貴之, born August 12, 1971) is a former Japanese professional baseball outfielder from Sunakawa, Hokkaido, Japan. He is a left handed hitter and fielder.

== Baseball career ==
Nishijima spent part of the 1990 season and all of 1992 in the United States, playing for the unaffiliated Salinas Spurs of the Class A+ California League. During those two seasons, he hit .270 with one home run, 133 hits, and 46 RBI to go along with 20 stolen bases.

After the 1992 California League season, the 20 year old Nishijima started playing for the Fukuoka Daiei Hawks, appearing in 2 NPB games at the end of their season.

Nishijima rejoined the Hawks in 1995, serving sporadically as a backup outfielder until 1999.
