= Tomoaki Egawa =

Japanese baseball player

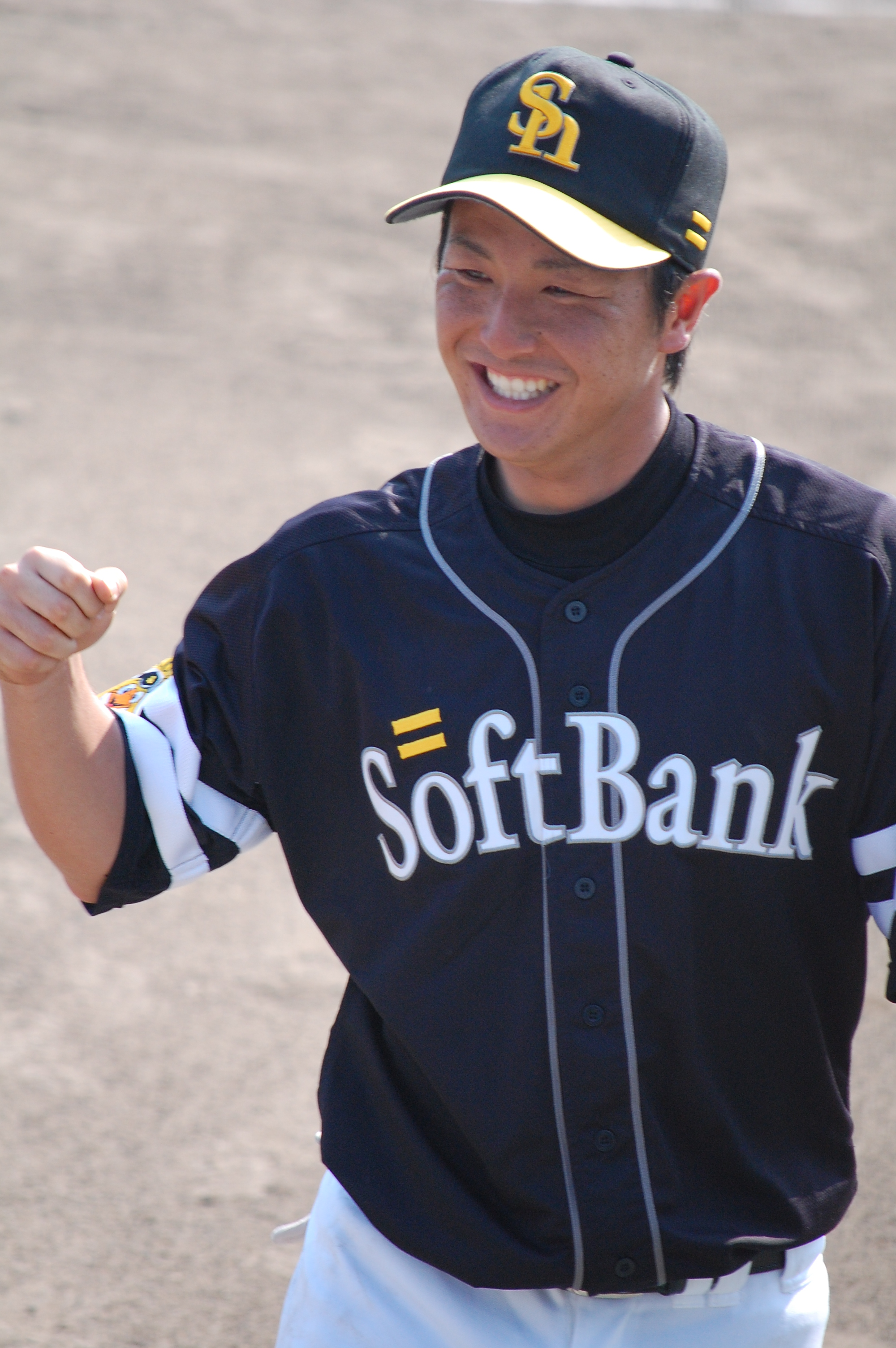
- Egawa with the Fukuoka SoftBank Hawks
- Outfielder
- Born: October 31, 1986 (age 39)
- Bats: Right Throws: Right

NPB debut
- 2006, for the Fukuoka SoftBank Hawks

NPB statistics (through 2019)
- Batting average: .235
- Home runs: 26
- RBI: 99
- Hits: 183
- Stats at Baseball Reference

Teams
- Fukuoka SoftBank Hawks (2006–2019)

Career highlights and awards
- 3× Japan Series Champion (2014, 2015, 2017)

Tomoaki Egawa (江川 智晃, born October 31, 1986, in Futami, Mie) is a Japanese former professional baseball outfielder in Japan's Nippon Professional Baseball. He played with the Fukuoka SoftBank Hawks from 2006 to 2019.
