= Manabu Saito (baseball) =

Japanese baseball player

- Pitcher / Coach
- Born: August 12, 1963 (age 62); Shimodate, Ibaraki, Japan
- Batted: Right Threw: Right

NPB debut
- April 18, 1986, for the Chunichi Dragons

Last appearance
- September 26, 1996, for the Fukuoka Daiei Hawks

NPB statistics (through 1996 season)
- Win–loss record: 7-10
- ERA: 5.53
- Saves: 3
- Strikeouts: 104
- Stats at Baseball Reference

Teams
- As player: Chunichi Dragons (1986–1989); Fukuoka Daiei Hawks (1990–1997); As coach: Fukuoka Daiei Hawks / Fukuoka SoftBank Hawks (2001–2006,2008–2023)

Manabu Saito (齋藤 学, Saitō Manabu; born August 12, 1963) is a Japanese former professional baseball pitcher, and current first squad pitching coach for the Fukuoka SoftBank Hawks of Nippon Professional Baseball (NPB).

He previously played for the Chunichi Dragons and the Fukuoka Daiei Hawks.

== Early baseball career ==
Saito went on to Aoyama Gakuin University, where he went 8-3 in the spring of his senior year and was named best pitcher and best nine.

== Professional career ==
=== Active player era ===
On November 20, 1985, Saito was drafted by the Chunichi Dragons in the 1985 Nippon Professional Baseball draft.

During the Chunichi era, he pitched in 24 games in four seasons from 1986 to 1989, going a 0-1 Win–loss record with an ERA of 8.64.

He was traded to the Fukuoka Daiei Hawks for Kiyoshi Yamanaka and pitched in 111 games over eight seasons from the 1990 to 1997 seasons, posting a record of a 7-9 Win–loss record, a 3 Saves, and a 5.05 ERA.

=== After retirement ===
Saito retired and became the pitching coach for the Fukuoka Daiei Hawks in the 2001 season, having previously served as the first squad pitching coach, second squad pitching coach, and rehabilitation coach.

He's been the first squad pitching coach since the 2022 season.

He retired as coach after the 2023 season.
