= Fukuoka SoftBank Hawks =

Japanese baseball team

- 福岡ソフトバンクホークス

Logo	Cap insignia

Information
- League: Nippon Professional Baseball Pacific League (1950–present) Japanese Baseball League (1938–1949)
- Location: Chūō-ku, Fukuoka, Japan
- Ballpark: Mizuho PayPay Dome Fukuoka
- Founded: February 22, 1938; 88 years ago
- Nickname(s): Taka (鷹, hawk)
- Japan Series championships: 13 (1959, 1964, 1999, 2003, 2011, 2014, 2015, 2017, 2018, 2019, 2020, 2025, 2026)
- JBL championships: 2 (1946, 1948)
- PL pennants: 22 (1951, 1952, 1953, 1955, 1959, 1961, 1964, 1965, 1966, 1973, 1999, 2000, 2003, 2010, 2011, 2014, 2015, 2017, 2020, 2024, 2025, 2026)
- Playoff berths: 21 (1973, 2004, 2005, 2006, 2007, 2009, 2010, 2011, 2012, 2014, 2015, 2016, 2017, 2018, 2019, 2020, 2022, 2023, 2024, 2025, 2026)
- Former name: Fukuoka Daiei Hawks (1989–2004); Nankai Hawks (1947–1988); Kinki Great Ring (1946–1947); Kinki Nippon Club (1944–1945); Nankai Club (1938–1944)
- Former ballparks: Heiwadai Stadium (1989–1992); Osaka Stadium (1950–1988); Koshien Stadium (1948–1949); Nankai Nakamozu Stadium (1939–1947); Sakai Ohama Stadium (1938)
- Colors: Revolution Yellow, Black, White, Grey
- Mascot: Harry Hawk and the Hawk Family
- Ownership: Masayoshi Son, Yoshimitsu Goto
- Management: SoftBank Group, Fukuoka SoftBank Hawks Corp.
- President: Sadaharu Oh
- General manager: Sugihiko Mikasa
- Manager: Hiroki Kokubo
- Website: softbankhawks.co.jp

Current uniforms

The Fukuoka SoftBank Hawks (福岡ソフトバンクホークス, Fukuoka Sofutobanku Hōkusu) are a Japanese professional baseball team based in Fukuoka, Fukuoka Prefecture. They compete in Nippon Professional Baseball (NPB) as a member of the Pacific League. Founded on February 22, 1938, as the Nankai Club, being the first Kansai team to play in Osaka proper, the team went through a few name changes before settling on Nankai Hawks in 1947, eventually changing ownership in 1988 and moving to Fukuoka in 1989. The team subsequently became known as the Fukuoka Daiei Hawks until 2005, when they were purchased by SoftBank Group, becoming the Fukuoka SoftBank Hawks. Since 1993, the Hawks have played at Mizuho PayPay Dome Fukuoka, which has gone under several name changes and seats 40,142 people.

The Hawks are often regarded as one of the most successful franchises in Pacific League and the richest in all of baseball under the ownership of SoftBank Group, with the second most wins in all of Japanese sports, only trailing the Yomiuri Giants. The Hawks have played in the Japan Series 23 different times. The club also won two Japanese Baseball League championships in 1946 and 1948 while the team was based in Osaka. The Hawks' 13 Japan Series championships, including seven championships between 2011 and 2020, and 22 Pacific League pennants, with the most recent of both coming in 2026, are tied for most in the Pacific League with the Saitama Seibu Lions and second-most in all of NPB, only trailing the Yomiuri Giants.

For various reasons, the Hawks experienced a 35 year title drought between 1964 and 1999 including a period of 25 years from 1974 to 1999 without a single Japan Series appearance, despite the relocation to Fukuoka. The drought finally ended in 1999, with gradual additions over the previous five years under new manager and all time home run king Sadaharu Oh. Under Oh (as manager and later executive), Daiei, and later SoftBank, the Hawks embraced internal development and sabremetrics as they eventually formed a baseball dynasty off of a core led by slugger Yuki Yanagita and aces Kodai Senga and Tsuyoshi Wada, capturing Japan Series titles in 2011, 2014, 2015, 2017, 2018, 2019, and 2020, making the Hawks the first team since the 1965–1973 Yomiuri Giants to win more than three consecutive championships.

Through 2026, the franchise's all-time record is 5,885–5,150–412 (.533). The team's current manager is Hiroki Kokubo and the organization's acting CEO is Yoshimitsu Goto.

== History ==
=== Nankai Electric Railway Company ownership (1938–1988) ===
The franchise that eventually became the Fukuoka SoftBank Hawks was founded on February 22, 1938, by Nankai Electric Railway president Jinkichi Terada as Nankai Club (南海軍, Nankai Gun), based in central Osaka. The organization was said to be created as a result of rival railway companies Hanshin Electric Railway and Hankyu convincing Nankai to create a baseball club of their own. While initially met with resistance, the club was admitted to the Japanese Baseball League (JPBL) in the fall of 1938, playing their first games at Sakai Ohama Stadium, but moved into Nakamozu Stadium in the city of Sakai in 1939. The team's name was changed to Kinki Nippon (近畿日本軍, Kinki Nippon Gun) in mid-1944 as wartime austerity measures forced Nankai to temporarily merge with Kinki Nippon Railway. After the 1945 hiatus in the JBL due to the ending stages of World War II in Japan, in 1946 the team's name was changed to Kinki Great Ring (近畿グレートリング, Kinki Gurēto Ringu) and the team won the JBL championship. The name was chosen as a translation of Japan's ancient name, Yamato, in a similar way to the Montreal Canadiens or the New York Yankees.

In mid-1947, when Nankai broke away from Kinki Nippon Railway, they decided to change the team's name, also due to the fact that the name was popular with American soldiers stationed in Osaka, since they also found it funny, and settled upon the moniker they would use until they would sell the team in 1988 – Nankai Hawks (南海ホークス, Nankai Hōkusu). The team was named after Nankai's logo, which, at that time, was a winged wheel. Other names considered were Condors, which was rejected because the Nankai representative who supervised the team was bald, and Cardinals, which was rejected because the club wanted to retain their colors, so they settled on the Hawks moniker.

After the JPBL was reorganized into Nippon Professional Baseball in 1950, the Hawks chose to join the upstart Pacific League alongside the Mainichi Orions, Hankyu Braves, Tokyu Flyers, Daiei Stars, Nishitetsu Clippers, and Kintetsu Pearls. They also moved into the freshly built Osaka Stadium in the ward of Naniwa-ku, Osaka, where they would play until their move to Fukuoka after the 1988 season. Under player-manager Kazuto Tsuruoka (known as Kazuto Yamamoto from 1946 to 1958) they became one of the most successful franchises through the first two decades of the Pacific League's existence, taking two Japan Series championships in 1959 and 1964, as well as 10 Pacific League pennants, an amount that would not be duplicated by the club until 2024. Tsuruoka managed the team from 1946 to 1968, becoming the full-time manager after his retirement as a player in 1952.

In 1964, the Hawks sent second year pitcher Masanori Murakami and two other young players to the San Francisco Giants' single-A affiliate in Fresno as baseball "exchange students". On September 1st of that year, Murakami became the first Japanese player to play in Major League Baseball when he appeared on the mound for the San Francisco Giants at Shea Stadium against the New York Mets. In his debut, Murakami pitched one inning, allowing one hit and facing four batters in a 1–4 loss for the Giants. Disputes over the rights to his contract eventually led to the 1967 United States – Japanese Player Contract Agreement, which effectively barred Japanese players from playing in MLB until Hideo Nomo exploited a loophole in the contract agreement to join the Los Angeles Dodgers in 1995, although others had tried before, most notably pitcher Yutaka Enatsu, who tried to walk on to the Milwaukee Brewers in 1985, but he was cut at the end of spring training. Murakami returned to the Hawks in 1966, playing for them through 1974. He contributed to the team's 1973 Japan Series appearance, their last under Nankai's ownership.

After player-manager Katsuya Nomura, the last player-manager to win a pennant in NPB, was traded to the Lotte Orions after he, under the influence of his second wife, Sachiyo, tried to float the idea of releasing Hiromitsu Kadota to management in 1978, the Hawks fell straight to the basement for two decades, not finishing with a winning record again until 1999. Following this debacle, Nankai's board of directors and union leadership put pressure on Den Kawakatsu, then-president of Nankai Electric Railways and primary owner of the team, to sell the team, which he refused to do. In response, Nankai's board refused to spend money on the Hawks beyond the bare minimum necessary to keep the team afloat. However, Kawakatsu, who represented the most ardent supporter of Nankai's ownership of the Hawks, died on April 23, 1988, and Nankai immediately put the team up for sale following Kawakatsu's death. The team was sold to supermarket chain Daiei, who moved the team to Fukuoka, to become the Fukuoka Daiei Hawks (福岡ダイエーホークス, Fukuoka Daiei Hōkusu) after the 1988 season.

=== Fukuoka Daiei Hawks (1988–2004) ===
After the franchise was acquired by department store chain Daiei, Inc., the Hawks were moved to Fukuoka for two reasons; the first being the fact that the city had gone a decade without a team in the area, as the Crown Lighter Lions moved to Tokorozawa to become the Seibu Lions in 1978, and the second was that Daiei was looking to expand their reach as a brand to Kyushu, which Daiei had little to no presence in before the acquisition. As a result, they were no longer competing with the Hanshin Tigers, Kintetsu Buffaloes or even the by-then rechristened Orix Braves (later the Orix Blue Wave, now the Orix Buffaloes) for a market share of the Greater Osaka metropolitan area. However, in spite of those efforts of the new ownership, the Hawks still were usually in the cellar of the Pacific League, and continued to be at the bottom half of the league until 1997. The Hawks would play their first four seasons in Fukuoka at the Lions' old home of Heiwadai Stadium.

In 1993, the Hawks moved out of Heiwadai Stadium and into the newly constructed Fukuoka Dome, now known as Mizuho PayPay Dome Fukuoka, located 2.2 kilometers northwest of Heiwadai Stadium's former grounds. Heiwadai Stadium would later be closed in November 1997 and fully demolished by 2008. The Fukuoka Dome would be the first retractable roof stadium in NPB and the only retractable roof stadium until 2023, when Es Con Field Hokkaido opened. However, due to inefficient design, high operating costs, and the rainy climate of Fukuoka, the roof is only opened on special occasions (e.g. on Children's Day and other holidays) when the weather is clear, or if the Hawks win and there is a 30% or less chance of precipitation and the wind speed at 10 meters above the roof is 10 meters per second or slower. Since the Hawks moved to the Fukuoka Dome, they have led Pacific League in annual average attendance every single year except for 2021, where pandemic restrictions in Japan prevented them from reaching said goal.

The Hawks front office adopted a strategy of drafting and developing younger players, supplemented by free agent signings, a policy overseen by team president Ryuzo Setoyama and his aides. Setoyama's most brilliant moves were the hiring of home run king Sadaharu Oh in 1995 to take the reins of manager, a title he would hold until 2008 before he moved into the general manager's position. As of 2026, Oh is still with the Hawks organization as a chairman of the Hawks' board of directors, and still engages with day-to-day operations of the team at the age of 86. Oh replaced then-manager Rikuo Nemoto, who was named team president and held that position until his death in 1999. Also tapped was Akira Ishikawa, a little-known former player, who was tasked with bringing in talented amateurs. He brought in the likes of Kenji Johjima, Kazumi Saitoh, Nobuhiko Matsunaka, Tadahito Iguchi, Munenori Kawasaki, and future team captain and current manager Hiroki Kokubo through the draft, all of whom went on to become stars for the Hawks.

Supplementing the amateur signings were some notable free-agent acquisitions. Daiei competed with the then richest man in Japan, Yoshiaki Tsutsumi, to pull former Seibu stars from their 1980s championship teams to Fukuoka. Among them were infielder Hiromichi Ishige, outfielder and Hawks manager from 2008 to 2014 Koji Akiyama, and left-handed pitcher and former manager Kimiyasu Kudoh.

These moves, alongside a few unpopular cost-cutting measures, helped to make the Hawks gradually more competitive with each passing year, and in 1999, the team finally broke through. That season, Daiei made their first Japan Series appearance since 1973 (and first as a Fukuoka team), and defeated the Chunichi Dragons in five games, giving them their first championship since 1964. Kudoh was dominant in his Game 1 start (complete game, 13 strikeouts), and Akiyama was named the 1999 Japan Series's most valuable player.

The following year, the Hawks again made the Japan Series, but this time lost to the Yomiuri Giants in six games, which saw two of the greatest players in NPB history, Oh and fellow Giants legend Shigeo Nagashima, face off as managers of their respective clubs. Despite the shaky financial ground that Daiei was on thanks to their rampant expansion in bubble-era Japan, the team continued to be competitive. The team won their second Japan Series in five years, defeating the Hanshin Tigers in seven games in the 2003 Japan Series, a series in which the home team won every game.

==== Home run record controversy ====
In 2001, American Karl "Tuffy" Rhodes, playing for the Osaka Kintetsu Buffaloes, hit 55 home runs with several games left, equaling Hawks' manager Sadaharu Oh's single-season home run record. The Buffaloes played a weekend series against the Oh-managed Hawks late in the season, after already clinching the pennant on a walk-off grand slam against the Orix BlueWave on September 26. Rhodes was intentionally walked during each at-bat of the series. Video footage showed Hawks' catcher Kenji Johjima grinning as he caught the intentional balls. Oh denied any involvement and Hawks battery coach Yoshiharu Wakana stated that the pitchers acted on his orders, saying, "It would be distasteful to see a foreign player break Oh's record." Rhodes completed the season with 55 home runs. League commissioner Hiromori Kawashima denounced the Hawks' behavior as "unsportsmanlike", and Wakana would be fired from the position as a result. Hawks pitcher Keisaburo Tanoue went on record saying that he wanted to throw strikes to Rhodes, but did not want to disrespect the orders of his catcher.

In 2002, Venezuelan Alex Cabrera hit 55 home runs with five games left in the season, with several of those to be played against Oh's Hawks. Oh told his pitchers to throw strikes to Cabrera, but most of them ignored his order and threw balls well away from the plate, although this also had to do with Cabrera later on being revealed to have likely been on steroids, likely taken during his time with the Arizona Diamondbacks after having been named to the Mitchell Report in 2007, and that other pitchers were intentionally walking him. After the game, Oh stated, "If you're going to break the record, you should do it by more than one. Do it by a lot." In the wake of the most recent incident involving Cabrera, ESPN listed Oh's single-season home run record as #2 on its list of "The Phoniest Records in Sports".

Eventually, in 2013, Curaçaoan-Dutch Tokyo Yakult Swallows outfielder Wladimir Balentien broke the NPB single-season home run record, finishing the season with 60 home runs. In 2022, Swallows infielder Munetaka Murakami broke Oh's record for the most home runs in a single season by a Japanese-born player, hitting 56 home runs in the regular season.

=== Fukuoka SoftBank Hawks (2005–present) ===
Daiei had been under financial pressure to sell its stake in the team over the previous few years, with reports in 2003 suggesting the company would sell the team and the Fukuoka Dome. After filing for a bankruptcy reorganization provision in 2004, Daiei attempted to hold on to the team and held discussions with its primary lenders, including UFJ Bank, to see if it could find a way to retain the team, but ultimately sold the team to SoftBank Group on January 28, 2005. Daiei also had rejected a merger attempt from the Chiba Lotte Marines during the bankruptcy process, as their bankruptcy proceedings also coincided with the vastly unpopular Orix-Kintetsu merger that eventually resulted in the creation of the Tohoku Rakuten Golden Eagles to serve as a phoenix club of the Osaka Kintetsu Buffaloes, who had been dissolved as a result of the aforementioned merger. SoftBank had been interested in owning a baseball team since 2002 and agreed to purchase all 14,432,000 of Daiei's shares in the team, which accounted for 98% of team ownership, for 15 billion yen. This deal did not include the Fukuoka Dome and surrounding Hawks Town complex, which was sold in 2003 to Colony Capital and then later sold to an affiliate of the Government of Singapore Investment Corporation in 2007. SoftBank initially decided to lease the rights to the Fukuoka Dome for 4.8 billion yen per year for 20 years, but they would eventually purchase the stadium from the GIC affiliate for 87 billion yen in March 2012, with the stadium being fully owned by the Fukuoka SoftBank Hawks Marketing Corporation by July 1, 2015.

The Hawks continued their winning ways after the sale of the team to SoftBank. Following the sale, the Hawks represented one of the richest teams in the world, with a player core still intact from the last years of the Daiei era. Particularly strong was the team's starting pitching behind Saitoh, Tsuyoshi Wada, Nagisa Arakaki, and Toshiya Sugiuchi. In 2005, the Hawks finished in first place during the regular season, but fell to the eventual Japan Series champions, the Chiba Lotte Marines in the second stage of the Climax Series. In 2006, a dramatic pennant race led to an even more exciting playoff run that ended in the Sapporo Dome at the hands of the eventual Japan Series Champions, the Hokkaido Nippon Ham Fighters. Team manager Sadaharu Oh missed most of the 2006 season due to stomach cancer.

The Hawks' 2007 season was plagued by injuries and general ineffectiveness and inconsistency, leading to another 3rd-place finish and first-stage exit in the playoffs at the hands of the Marines. In 2008, though various injuries still affected the Hawks' bench (especially the bullpen), the club claimed its first Interleague title in June, winning a tiebreaker against the Hanshin Tigers. However, injuries caught up with them in the final month of the season, and the Hawks finished in last place with a 54–74–2 record. The finish represented their worst since 1996. Oh announced his transfer to a front office role at the end of the season, as former Hawk and fan favorite Koji Akiyama was named as his successor.

In 2009, the team cracked the playoffs once again on the backs of breakout seasons from surging starting pitcher D. J. Houlton, outfielder Yuya Hasegawa, Rookie of the Year Tadashi Settsu and another stellar season from ace Sugiuchi. However, the team still was unable to get out of the first stage, as the Tohoku Rakuten Golden Eagles ousted the Hawks in a 2-game sweep.

==== Team of the 2010s ====
The Hawks finally reclaimed the Pacific League regular season title in 2010 after a seven-year wait. The title came after a see-saw season in which the team recovered several times after extended losing streaks. Starting pitcher Wada, back from injury through much of the previous two seasons, was, along with fellow ace Sugiuchi, at his best. Wada set career highs in wins and games started. The reliable "SBM" relieving trio of Settsu, Brian Falkenborg, and Mahara limited opponent offenses late in games. The bullpen also benefited from the emergence of Keisuke Kattoh and Masahiko Morifuku, with the latter blossoming in the second half of the season.

The Hawks offense was largely composed of role players who seemed to take turns having big games and off days, and it was the team's speed that drove the team as the Hawks led the league in stolen bases in the regular season with 148, well ahead of their nearest challenger, who had 116. Yuichi Honda and Kawasaki combined to steal 89 bases. However, despite putting forward a strong group, the Hawks failed to make it to the Japan Series, losing to the Chiba Lotte Marines in six games in the Climax Series despite having a 3–1 series lead. Following the Climax Series defeat, the Hawks became the first team in NPB to form a second farm team for additional development and rehabilitation, which is often credited for their run of dominance throughout the 2010s, as many key contributors, such as current New York Mets pitcher Kodai Senga, 2018 Japan Series MVP Takuya Kai, and two-time World Baseball Classic utility man Taisei Makihara, were taken through the developmental draft and started their professional careers on the second farm team.

SoftBank won the Pacific League again in 2011, with a dominating season on all fronts. The offense was bolstered further by the acquisition of former Yokohama BayStars outfielder Seiichi Uchikawa, who led the league in batting average in 2011. Pitching from Sugiuchi, Wada, and an excellent bounce-back season from Houlton also helped propel the team to the best record in NPB. After sweeping the Saitama Seibu Lions in the Pacific League Climax Series, the Hawks took on the Chunichi Dragons to win the Japan Series, a rematch of the 1999 Japan Series. The Dragons pushed SoftBank to the full seven games, but the Hawks shut out the Dragons 3–0 in the seventh game to win their first Japan Series since 2003.

The 2012 season started with losses for the Hawks. During the off season, they lost their star starters Tsuyoshi Wada (to the Baltimore Orioles), Toshiya Sugiuchi and D.J. Houlton (to Yomiuri Giants) through free agency. All star shortstop Munenori Kawasaki also left the team for the Seattle Mariners. Closer Takahiro Mahara would sit out the season through injury. To compensate for these losses, the team acquired outfielder Wily Mo Peña and starter Brad Penny from MLB, in addition to starter Kazuyuki Hoashi from the Lions. However, of the 3 major signings, only Peña made regular contributions. Hoashi and Penny made two starts combined in 2012, as Hoashi missed almost the entire season with an injury and Penny was released.

The team had to deal with their off season losses to their pitching staff from within the organization. Settsu was elevated to the team's ace, while young pitchers such as Kenji Otonari and Hiroki Yamada were given bigger roles. Nagisa Arakaki returned from long-term injury to join the rotation. However, new closer Falkenborg had to sit out most of the season through injury, eventually handing over the role to Morifuku. Arakaki could not regain his former numbers. In the end, the losses could not be mitigated. Despite a tailspin to end the season, the Hawks snuck into the Climax Series, finishing 3rd in the Pacific League regular season standings, one game over the Tohoku Rakuten Golden Eagles, but eventually lost out to the pennant-winning Hokkaido Nippon-Ham Fighters in the P.L. Climax Series Final Stage. The bright spark of the season came from rookie starter Shota Takeda, who went 8–1 with an ERA of 1.07. The Hawks took a step back in 2013, missing the postseason for the first time since 2008.

In 2014, the Hawks held off the breakout of the Shohei Ohtani-led Fighters and resurgent Orix Buffaloes to win the Pacific League pennant by a .002 winning percentage difference over the Buffaloes, later winning that year's Japan Series in five games over the Hanshin Tigers. Manager Koji Akiyama retired after the season, and the team named his former teammate, Kimiyasu Kudoh, to succeed him. Under Kudoh's stewardship, the Hawks won back-to-back Japan Series championships for the first time in club history, defeating the Tokyo Yakult Swallows in five games in the 2015 Japan Series. Outfielder Yuki Yanagita won Pacific League MVP, the batting title, a Triple 3 (.300 BA, 30 HR, 30 SB or better in all 3 categories), and tied the franchise's best single season performance with 11.5 fWAR, first set by Tadashi Sugiura in 1959. It marked the first time since the Seibu Lions won three in a row from 1990 to 1992 that a team had won consecutive Japan Series championships.

After falling to Shohei Ohtani and the Fighters in 2016, the Hawks rebounded to win the 2017 Japan Series on the back of a dominant 94–49–0 season, their best season since 1959 in terms of winning percentage, in six games over the Yokohama DeNA BayStars, in a series where the Hawks led 3–0, but were almost pushed to a seventh game, winning their third title in four seasons on an 11th-inning walk-off RBI single by Keizo Kawashima in Game 6. The following year, the Hawks upset the pennant-winning Saitama Seibu Lions in the 2018 Pacific League Climax Series, and then won the 2018 Japan Series against the Hiroshima Toyo Carp in six games, winning back-to-back titles for a second time in the past five seasons. In 2019, the Hawks became the first team to win three straight Japan Series titles since the 1990–1992 Seibu Lions, by once again upsetting the pennant-winning Lions in the 2019 Pacific League Climax Series, and then swept the Yomiuri Giants in four games. This also meant that the Hawks defeated each of the six Central League clubs in the Japan Series in the 2010s. Kodai Senga would blossom into the team's ace over their run of six championships in seven seasons, as he threw the team's first no-hitter since 1943 on September 6, 2019, against the Chiba Lotte Marines.

==== 2020s ====
In 2020, the Hawks won the 2020 Japan Series, again in a four game sweep over the Yomiuri Giants, becoming the first team to win more than three consecutive Japan Series titles since the Yomiuri Giants won the last of nine consecutive titles in 1973. They also became the first team in NPB history to sweep two Japan Series against the same opponent in back-to-back seasons. Most notably, Matt Moore pitched seven no-hit innings in Game 3 of that Japan Series as the Hawks came within one out of the first combined no-hitter in Japan Series play since Daisuke Yamai and Hitoki Iwase threw a combined perfect game for the Chunichi Dragons to end the 2007 Japan Series.

The Hawks finished an injury-plagued and disappointing 2021 season with a 60–62–21 record, placing fourth in the Pacific League. It was the team's first time missing the playoffs since 2013 and their first sub-.500 season since 2008. Manager Kimiyasu Kudoh stepped down following the conclusion of the 2021 season.

Following Kudoh's departure, farm team manager Hiroshi Fujimoto was promoted to the majors to be the new manager for 2022. Yuki Yanagita was named team captain by Fujimoto, becoming the first team captain since Seiichi Uchikawa gave up the role after the 2018 season. The Hawks went on a tear to begin the season, winning eight straight games, with Fujimoto being the first new manager to win seven consecutive games, and the first time since 1955 that the Hawks won eight straight games to open the season. A solid spring, including a Maddux no-hitter by Nao Higashihama on May 12 against the Saitama Seibu Lions, followed by a less than ideal summer filled with ups and downs, including going 1–9 in their annual Hawk Festival series and being the first team since the 1995 Seibu Lions to be no-hit by the Hokkaido Nippon-Ham Fighters, led to the Hawks losing the pennant race to the Orix Buffaloes via tiebreaker after the Hawks lost to the Chiba Lotte Marines on the final day of the season, with both teams finishing with a record of 76–65–2. This marked the first time the top two teams in a league shared the exact same record in NPB history at the conclusion of the regular season, resulting in a tiebreaker being necessary. The Hawks lost the overall regular season series against Orix, as the Buffaloes won 15 games against them in comparison to SoftBank's 10 wins, resulting in Orix taking the 2022 Pacific League pennant. They would eventually fall to the Buffaloes in the second stage of the Climax Series, breaking an eighteen game playoff winning streak in the process.

On October 10, 2022, the Hawks announced the formation of a yon-gun squad (third farm team), becoming the first team in NPB to begin operations on a third farm team, beginning play in 2023. Before the 2023 season, the Hawks added to their already loaded core in response to losing ace Kodai Senga to the New York Mets by signing elite contact hitter Kensuke Kondoh to a 7-year deal from the Hokkaido Nippon-Ham Fighters, poaching elite reliever Roberto Osuna away from the Chiba Lotte Marines, and signing Kohei Arihara after a failed stint with the Texas Rangers. Despite these additions and Kondoh breaking out for a near Triple Crown season, only losing it out to Yuma Tongu also having a breakout campaign and winning the 2023 Pacific League Batting Title, the Hawks were hampered by a lack of foreign power and subpar pitching, being unable to climb the mountain and settled for a third place finish in Pacific League, losing out on second on the final day of regular season play, the second year in a row where they lost position on the final day of the regular season. Eventually, they would fall short, losing to the Marines in the 1st Stage of the Pacific League Climax Series. After that, it was announced that Fujimoto was to step down as manager due to health concerns, and was replaced by the club's farm team manager Hiroki Kokubo. The Hawks once again were active in the 2023–24 off-season, trading pitchers Keisuke Izumi and Rei Takahashi for Yomiuri Giants slugger Adam Walker, acquiring first baseman slugger Hotaka Yamakawa after a scandal tarnished his image with the Lions, and extended foreign pitchers Liván Moinelo and Carter Stewart to long-term, record setting deals, as well as converting Moinelo from a reliever to a starter to bolster their lackluster pitching. These moves worked, as the Hawks would dominate in 2024, locking up their 20th Pacific League pennant on September 23, having taken first in Pacific League on April 4 and never relinquishing it. This led them to a 91–49–3 record, the most wins put up by an NPB team since their 94–49 record in 2017. However, they would get shut down by the Yokohama DeNA BayStars in the 2024 Japan Series in six games, breaking an NPB record 14 game Japan Series win streak and marking the first Hawks' Japan Series loss in the SoftBank era. They also became the first team since the 2002 Seibu Lions to win 90 games in a season and lose the Japan Series. The Hawks also set a Japan Series record of going 29 consecutive innings (from the 1st inning of Game 3 to the 4th inning of Game 6) without scoring a single run.

Following the 2024 Japan Series loss, the Hawks rallied past a poor start to their 2025 campaign to win the PL pennant again over the Fighters by 4.5 games. They became the first team in Climax Series history to allow a winner-take-all Game 6 to happen after starting the series up 3-0, but were able to squeeze past the Fighters in Game 6 to advance to the 2025 Japan Series. There, they defeated the Hanshin Tigers in five games to win their 12th Japan Series as a franchise and the club's eighth Japan Series title since 2011. In 2026, the Hawks matched their 2024 campaign with another 91–49–3 campaign, cruising past the resurgent Saitama Seibu Lions to capture their first pennant three-peat since 1964–1966. This was also their 7th 90-win season in franchise history, matching the total number of 90-win seasons recorded by every other team in NPB history combined (4 by the Lions, 2 by the Giants, and 1 by the defunct Shochiku Robins). They followed that up by avenging their 2024 Japan Series upset by defeating the BayStars in a tightly contested sweep of the 2026 Japan Series, where each of the first three games went to extra innings.

== Roster ==
Fukuoka SoftBank Hawks roster
First team		Second team
Pitchers: 2 Carter Stewart Jr.; 10 Naoyuki Uwasawa; 11 Yūki Tsumori; 14 Jackson Rutledge; 18 Hsu Jo-Hsi; 26 Gōta Suzuki; 34 Alexander Armenta; 35 Liván Moinelo; 40 Kazuki Sugiyama; 41 Yūgo Maeda; 42 Yūsuke Itoh; 49 Haru Matsumoto; 54 Roberto Osuna; 59 Fūga Ohtake; 63 Darwinzon Hernández; 64 Taiga Kamichatani; 66 Yūki Matsumoto; 68 Hikaru Kimura; 95 Tatsuto Kobayashi; Catchers: 00 Riku Watanabe; 39 Yūdai Yamamoto; 45 Kenta Tanigawara; 55 Sōichirō Ishizuka; 62 Takashi Umino	Infielders: 0 Hikaru Kawase; 4 Jeter Downs; 5 Hotaka Yamakawa; 8 Taisei Makihara; 24 Ryōya Kurihara; 25 Yūdai Shōji; 33 Ryūta Hirose; 36 Itua Ikhine; Outfielders: 3 Kensuke Kondoh; 9 Yūki Yanagita; 23 Ukyō Shūtō; 31 Tomoya Masaki; 32 Tatsuru Yanagimachi; 44 Yoshiyasu Sasagawa; 57 Riku Ogata; 61 Yūto Kawamura; Manager: 90 Hiroki Kokubo; Coaches: 94 Shinji Kurano (Chief pitching/Head coordinator); 72 Kenichi Wakatabe (Bullpen pitching); 71 Kenichi Nakata (Assistant bullpen pitching); 93 Arihito Muramatsu (Chief fielding); 78 Yūya Hasegawa (Batting/skill); 80 Yūichi Honda (Infield defense/base running/strategy); 79 Takayuki Ōnishi (Outfield defense/base running/strategy); 87 Tōru Hosokawa (Battery)	Pitchers: 13 Ryūta Inagawa; 16 Nao Higashihama; 17 Chang Chun-Wei; 19 Ryōsuke Ohtsu; 20 Taito Murakami; 22 Haruto Fujiwara; 27 Shunsuke Iwai; 28 Shun Antoku; 29 Ryūsei Ohe; 30 Toshiya Nakamura; 43 Hokuto; 47 Tomohisa Ohzeki; 48 Kouya Fujii; 50 Masato Sagara; 51 Jun Maeda; 53 Ryō Ohyama; 58 Taisei Kimura; 60 Kazuo Ohno; 69 Shunsuke Iwasaki; 85 Luis Rodríguez; Catchers: 12 Hiroki Minei; 65 Yūtarō Fujita	Infielders: 6 Kenta Imamiya; 7 Akira Nakamura; 46 Shinjirō Uno; 52 Yūto Akihiro; 56 Takanori Takahashi; 67 Sōma Ishimi; 99 Isami Nomura; Outfielders: 77 Keita Yamamoto; Manager: 88 Kazumi Saitoh (Second squad); Coaches: 73 Takashi Ogasawara (Chief pitching); 86 Masato Okumura (Pitching); 74 Shigeru Morikasa (Batting); 91 Keisuke Kaneko (Infield defense/base running); 96 Ryūma Kidokoro (Outfield defense/base running); 84 Hiroaki Takaya (Battery); Third squad: 92 Motoi Ōkoshi (Manager); 97 Felipe (Chief pitching); 76 Hayato Terahara (Pitching); 75 Noriyoshi Ohmichi (Batting); 82 Tomoki Takata (Infield defense/base running); 98 Fumikazu Takanami (Outfield defense/base running); 83 Masaumi Shimizu (Battery); Fourth squad: 014 Takashi Sasagawa (Chief/defense/base running); 013 Kazuhisa Makita (Pitching); 018 Masahiro Nakatani (Batting); Coordinators: 012 Hidetaka Kawagoe (General farm pitching); 020 Jyunji Hoshino (Pitching); 023 Hisao Arakane (General fielding); 019 Kōichi Sekikawa (Fielding); 022 Hiroyuki Mori (Fielding); 021 Tatsuya Ide (Fielding); 011 Hiroshi Narahara (General fielding advisor)
Development Players
128 Shinichirō Kawano (P); 137 Kenshirō Tsukayama (P); 138 Yūta Aihara (P); 140 Kōichirō Okada (P); 146 Ryūsei Ohya (P); 149 Taiga Kumagai (P); 152 Dan Shioji (P); 155 Renta Nagasaki (P); 125 Sou Ohtomo (C); 133 Kanta Ikeda (C); 121 Zairen (IF); 127 Yūki Hirose (IF); 144 Ayumu Ezaki (IF); 150 Reo Ōhashi (IF); 174 Jonathan Moreno (IF); 143 Kōha Gyofu (OF); 147 Hayato Kinoshita (OF); 151 Takahiro Suzuki (OF); 158 Emil (OF)
Updated October 30, 2026		→ All NPB rosters

=== Former players ===
==== Hawks former players ====
Hawks former players

DS	FS	Former players	Country	YR	Era	Pos	Note
1938	1942	Yoshiyuki Iwamoto	Japan	5	Nankai	OF	Pacific League Best Nine Award (1950,1951); Japanese Baseball Hall of Fame Member
1939	1952	Kazuto Tsuruoka	Japan	4	Nankai	IF	JBL & Pacific League MVP Award (1946,1948,1951); Japanese Baseball Hall of Fame Member
1942	1948	Takehiko Bessho	Japan	7	Nankai	P	Eiji Sawamura Award (1947); Japanese Baseball Hall of Fame Member
1949	1953	Kazuhiro Kuroda	Japan	5	Nankai	OF	
1950	1959	Kazuo Kageyama	Japan	10	Nankai	3B	Pacific League Best Nine Award (1951,1952)
1954	1971	Mutsuo Minagawa	Japan	18	Nankai	P	Pacific League Best Nine Award (1968); Japanese Baseball Hall of Fame Member
1954	1977	Katsuya Nomura	Japan	23	Nankai	C	NPB Triple Crown Award (1965); Japanese Baseball Hall of Fame Member
1955	1977	Yoshinori Hirose	Japan	23	Nankai	SS	Pacific League Best Nine Award (1963–1965); Japanese Baseball Hall of Fame Member
1956	1968	Yoshio Anabuki	Japan	13	Nankai	OF	
1958	1970	Tadashi Sugiura	Japan	13	Nankai	P	Pacific League MVP Award (1959); Japanese Baseball Hall of Fame Member
1960	1965	Joe Stanka	United States	6	Nankai	P	Pacific League Best Nine Award (1964); Japan Series MVP (1964)
1961	1963	Buddy Peterson	United States	3	Nankai	SS	Former MLB player. NPB All-Star Series (1962,1963)
1962	1967	Kent Hadley	United States	6	Nankai	1B	
1962 & 1966	1963 & 1974	Masanori Murakami	Japan	17	Nankai	P	First Asian MLB player. San Francisco Giants (1964–1965)
1964	1964	Johnny Logan	United States	1	Nankai	SS	Former MLB player.
1967	1970	Toshio Yanagida	Japan	4	Nankai	OF	NPB All-Star Series (1968)
1968	1968	Marty Keough	United States	1	Nankai	OF	Former MLB player.
1969	1969	Lee Thomas	United States	1	Nankai	OF	Former MLB player.
1970	1977	Don Blasingame	United States	8	Nankai	IF	
1970	1973	Clarence Jones	United States	4	Nankai	1B	Former MLB player. Pacific League Home runs Leader (1974,1976)
1970 & 1991	1988 & 1992	Hiromitsu Kadota	Japan	21	Nankai/Daiei	OF	Pacific League MVP Award (1988); Japanese Baseball Hall of Fame Member
1970	1972	Takashi Teraoka	Japan	3	Nankai	OF	
1971	1971	Thad Tillotson	United States	1	Nankai	P	
1972	1975	Takenori Emoto	Japan	4	Nankai	P	
1972	1973	Willie Smith	United States	2	Nankai	OF	Former MLB player.
1972	1981	Shinsaku Katahira	Japan	10	Nankai	IF, OF	
1973	1976	Hiroaki Fukushi	Japan	4	Nankai	P	Pacific League Winning percentage Leader (1980)
1974	1974	Wes Parker	United States	1	Nankai	1B	Former MLB player. MLB Gold Glove Award (1967–1972)
1975	1985	Hiromasa Arai	Japan	11	Nankai	OF	Pacific League Batting Leader (1987); Pacific League Best Nine Award (1979,1982,1986,1987)
1975	1975	Jim Nettles	United States	1	Nankai	OF	Former MLB player.
1976	1976	Don Buford	United States	1	Nankai	IF	Pacific League Best Nine Award (1974)
1976	1977	Yutaka Enatsu	Japan	2	Nankai	P	Eiji Sawamura Award (1968); Pacific League Saves Leader (1977,1979–1983)
1976	1976	Tom Robson	United States	1	Nankai	1B	Former MLB player.
1977	1977	Gail Hopkins	United States	1	Nankai	1B	Former MLB player.
1977	1977	Jack Pierce	United States	1	Nankai	1B	Mexican Professional Baseball Hall of Fame Member
1978	1981	Carlos May	United States	4	Nankai	OF	
1978	1985	Mitsuo Tateishi	Japan	8	Nankai	IF	
1978	1978	Bobby Tolan	United States	1	Nankai	OF	Former MLB player.
1979	1980	Frank Ortenzio	United States	2	Nankai	OF	
1980	1989	Nobuyuki Kagawa	Japan	10	Nankai/Daiei	C	Also known as Dokaben
1981	1982	Jim Tyrone	United States	2	Nankai	OF	Former MLB player.
1982	1998	Hiroshi Fujimoto	Japan	17	Nankai/Daiei	3B	
1983	1996	Hiroshi Ogawa	Japan	14	Nankai/Daiei	SS	
1984	1985	Jeff Doyle	United States	2	Nankai	2B	Former MLB player. Pacific League Home runs Leader (1974,1976)
1984	1995	Shinichi Katoh	Japan	12	Nankai/Daiei	P	
1984	1986	Chris Nyman	United States	3	Nankai	1B	Former MLB player.
1984	1993	Makoto Sasaki	Japan	10	Nankai/Daiei	OF	Pacific League Batting Leader (1992); Pacific League Best Nine Award (1991–1995,1997)
1986	1986	Danny Goodwin	United States	1	Nankai	1B	Former MLB player.
1986	1987	Dave Hostetler	United States	2	Nankai	1B	Former MLB player.
1987	1987	Steve Hammond	United States	1	Nankai	OF	
1987	1987	Hideji Katoh	Japan	1	Nankai	OF	Pacific League Batting Leader (1973,1979); Pacific League RBI leader (1975–1976 ,1979)
1987	1991	Hiroyuki Mori	Japan	5	Nankai/Daiei	C	
1987	1996	Hiroshi Moriwaki	Japan	10	Nankai/Daiei	IF	
1988	1990	Tony Bernazard	Puerto Rico	3	Nankai/Daiei	2B	
1988	2006	Noriyoshi Omichi	Japan	19	Nankai/Daiei /SoftBank	OF	NPB All-Star Series (2001, 2004)
1988 & 1993	1988 & 1993	George Wright	United States	2	Nankai/Daiei	OF	
1988	1998	Toyohiko Yoshida	Japan	11	Nankai/Daiei	P	Pacific League Best Battery Award (1994)
1988	2000	Koichiro Yoshinaga	Japan	13	Nankai/Daiei	C	Pacific League Best Nine Award (1994,1996)
1989	1990	Willie Upshaw	United States	2	Daiei	1B	
1990	1993	Toshifumi Baba	Japan	4	Daiei	3B	Mitsui Golden Glove Award (1995,1996)
1990	1990	Goose Gossage	United States	1	Daiei	P	National Baseball Hall of Fame and Museum
1990	2000	Takayuki Nishijima	Japan	11	Daiei	OF	
1990	1997	Manabu Saito	Japan	8	Daiei	P	
1990	2007	Keisaburo Tanoue	Japan	18	Daiei/SoftBank	P	Pacific League Winning percentage Leader (2001)
1990	1990	Jim Wilson	United States	2	Daiei	1B	Former MLB player.
1991	1997	Yutaka Ashikaga	Japan	7	Daiei	P	
1991	2003	Koji Bonishi	Japan	13	Daiei	C	
1991	1996	Takayoshi Eguchi	Japan	6	Daiei	P	
1991	1992	Mike Laga	United States	2	Daiei	1B	Former MLB player.
1991 & 2009	2003 & 2010	Arihito Muramatsu	Japan	14	Daiei/SoftBank	OF	Pacific League Stolen bases Leader (1996); Mitsui Golden Glove Award (2003, 2004)
1991	1995	Tsuyoshi Shimoyanagi	Japan	5	Daiei	P	Central League The most wins champion (2005)
1991	1993	Lee Tunnell	United States	3	Daiei	P	
1991	1992	Eddie Williams	United States	2	Daiei	3B	Former MLB player.
1992	2001	Chihiro Hamana	Japan	10	Daiei	SS	NPB All-Star Series (1992,1995,1996)
1992	1992	Hisao Niura	Japan	2	Daiei	P	Central League ERA champion (1977, 1978); Central League Best Nine Award (1978)
1992	1995	Kazuya Tabata	Japan	4	Daiei	P	
1992	2002	Kenichi Wakatabe	Japan	11	Daiei	P	Pacific League Rookie Special Award (1992); NPB All-Star Series (2002)
1992	1992	Boomer	United States	1	Daiei	1B	Pacific League Batting Leader (1984,1989); Pacific League RBI Leader (1984,1987,1989,1992)
1993	1995	Shinichi Sato	Japan	3	Daiei	OF	
1994	2002	Koji Akiyama	Japan	9	Daiei	OF	Pacific League Home runs Leader (1987); Japanese Baseball Hall of Fame Member
1994 & 2007	2003 & 2012	Hiroki Kokubo	Japan	16	Daiei/SoftBank	IF	Pacific League Home runs Leader (1995); Pacific League RBI Leader (1997)
1994	1997	Hiromi Matsunaga	Japan	4	Daiei	IF	Pacific League Stolen bases Leader (1985); Pacific League Best Nine Award (1988–1991,1994)
1994	1995	Kevin Reimer	United States	2	Daiei	OF	
1994	1995	Bobby Thigpen	United States	2	Daiei	P	Former MLB single season saves holder.
1994	1994	Brian Traxler	United States	1	Daiei	1B	
1994	1997	Tomoyuki Uchiyama	Japan	4	Daiei	P	
1994	2001	Hidekazu Watanabe	Japan	8	Daiei	P	Pacific League Rookie of the Year Award (1994)
1994	2006	Shuji Yoshida	Japan	13	Daiei/SoftBank	P	Pacific League Holds Leader (1998, 2001)
1994	2006	Shintaro Yoshitake	Japan	13	Daiei/SoftBank	P	NPB All-Star Series (2005)
1995	2000	Masao Fujii	Japan	6	Daiei	P	Pacific League Holds Leader (1999); His number 15 is honored by the Hawks.
1995	1996	Hiromichi Ishige	Japan	2	Daiei	SS	Pacific League Best Nine Award (1981–1987,1992,1993); Mitsui Golden Glove Award (1981–1983,1985–1988,1991,1993)
1995	2005	Kenji Johjima	Japan	11	Daiei/SoftBank	C	Former MLB player. Pacific League MVP Award (2003)
1995	1999	Kimiyasu Kudo	Japan	5	Daiei	P	Pacific League ERA Champion (1985, 1987, 1993, 1999); Japanese Baseball Hall of Fame Member
1995	1995	Kevin Mitchell	United States	1	Daiei	OF	Former MLB player. Silver Slugger Award (1989)
1996	1997	Masashi Arikura	Japan	2	Daiei	P	
1996	1996	Rodney Bolton	United States	1	Daiei	P	Former MLB player.
1996	1999	Ryo Kawano	Japan	4	Daiei	1B	
1996	1997	José Núñez	Dominican Republic	2	Daiei	P	
1996	2010	Kazumi Saito	Japan	15	Daiei/SoftBank	P	Eiji Sawamura Award (2003, 2006); NPB Triple Crown (2006)
1996	2002	Masahiro Sakumoto	Japan	7	Daiei	P	
1996	1998	Kazuhiro Takeda	Japan	3	Daiei	P	Pacific League The most wins champion (1998); Pacific League Saves Leader (1991)
1997	2004	Tadahito Iguchi	Japan	8	Daiei	IF	Former MLB player. Pacific League Stolen bases Leader (2001, 2003)
1997	2007	Shinji Kurano	Japan	11	Daiei/SoftBank	P	
1997	2015	Nobuhiko Matsunaka	Japan	19	Daiei/SoftBank	1B	NPB Triple Crown Award (2004); Pacific League MVP Award (2000, 2004)
1997	1997	Rod Nichols	United States	1	Daiei	P	Former MLB player.
1997	2006	Katsunori Okamoto	Japan	10	Daiei/SoftBank	P	
1997	1997	Greg Pirkl	United States	1	Daiei	1B	Former MLB player.
1997	2011	Hiroshi Shibahara	Japan	15	Daiei/SoftBank	OF	Pacific League Best Nine Award (1998, 2000); Mitsui Golden Glove Award (2000, 2001, 2003)
1997	1997	Fujio Tamura	Japan	1	Daiei	C	Pacific League Best Nine Award (1993)
1997	1997	David West	United States	1	Daiei	P	
1998	1998	Ryan Hancock	United States	1	Daiei	P	
1998	1999	Shintaro Yamasaki	Japan	2	Daiei	P	
1998	2002	Hiroshi Nagadomi	Japan	5	Daiei	P	
1998	2008	Junji Hoshino	Japan	11	Daiei/SoftBank	P	
1998	1998	Luis Lopez	United States	1	Daiei	1B	Central League RBI Leader (1996,1997); Central League Hitting Leader (1997)
1998	2005	Tomohiro Nagai	Japan	8	Daiei/SoftBank	P	1999 Japan Series Outstanding Player Award
1998	2001	Tatsuji Nishimura	Japan	4	Daiei	P	NPB Comeback Player of the Year Award (1998)
1998 & 2003	2002 & 2005	Takashi Sasagawa	Japan	18	Daiei/SoftBank	IF	
1998	2009	Takayuki Shinohara	Japan	12	Daiei/SoftBank	P	Pacific League Winning percentage Leader (1999)
1998	1998	Ryan Thompson	United States	1	Daiei	OF	
1998	1998	Brian Williams	United States	1	Daiei	P	Former MLB player.
1999	2005	Yudai Deguchi	Japan	7	Daiei/SoftBank	OF	
1999	2000	Melvin Nieves	Puerto Rico	2	Daiei	OF	
1999	2010	Akio Mizuta	Japan	12	Daiei/SoftBank	P	
1999	2012	Shinsuke Ogura	Japan	14	Daiei/SoftBank	P	
1999	2002	Rodney Pedraza	United States	4	Daiei	P	Pacific League Saves Leader (2000, 2001)
1999	2006	Yusuke Torigoe	Japan	8	Daiei/SoftBank	IF	
1999	2008	Ryo Yoshimoto	Japan	10	Daiei/SoftBank	IF	
2000	2000	Brian Banks	United States	1	Daiei	1B	
2000 & 2017	2011 & 2017	Munenori Kawasaki	Japan	13	Daiei/SoftBank	IF	Former MLB player. Currently with Tochigi Golden Braves; Pacific League Hits Leader (2004); Pacific League stolen base Leader (2004)
2000	2009	Naoki Matoba	Japan	10	Daiei/SoftBank	C	Pacific League Best Battery Award (2006)
2000	2002	Brady Raggio	United States	3	Daiei	P	
2000	2000	Matt Randel	United States	1	Daiei	P	
2001	2010	Hisao Arakane	Japan	11	Daiei/SoftBank	OF	
2001	2001	Chris Haney	United States	1	Daiei	P	
2001	2004	Pedro Valdés	Puerto Rico	4	Daiei	OF	He scored a 104 RBIs. (2003)
2001	2008	Michinao Yamamura	Japan	8	Daiei/SoftBank	P	
2001	2013	Katsuki Yamazaki	Japan	13	Daiei/SoftBank	C	
2002	2002	Morgan Burkhart	United States	1	Daiei	1B	
2002	2002	Carlos Castillo	United States	1	Daiei	P	Former MLB player.
2002	2010	Shotaro Ide	Japan	9	Daiei/SoftBank	OF	
2002	2012	Yasushi Kamiuchi	Japan	11	Daiei/SoftBank	P	
2002	2011	Toshiya Sugiuchi	Japan	10	Daiei/SoftBank	P	Eiji Sawamura Award (2005); Pacific League MVP Award (2005)
2002 & 2013	2006 & 2018	Hayato Terahara	Japan	11	Daiei/SoftBank	P	
2002	2005	Masanori Taguchi	Japan	4	Daiei/SoftBank	C	
2003	2014	Nagisa Arakaki	Japan	12	Daiei/SoftBank	P	Pacific League Strikeouts Leader (2004)
2003	2004	Brandon Knight	United States	2	Daiei	P	
2003	2003	Bryant Nelson	United States	1	Daiei	2B	
2003	2003	Matt Skrmetta	United States	1	Daiei	P	
2003	2003	Chen Wen-bin	Taiwan	1	Daiei	OF	
2003 & 2016	2011 & 2024	Tsuyoshi Wada	Japan	20	Daiei/SoftBank	P	Former MLB player. Last player of the "Matsuzaka Generation" until 2024.
2003	2006	Julio Zuleta	Panama	4	Daiei/SoftBank	1B	Pacific League Best Nine Award (2005)
2004	2022	Kenji Akashi	Japan	19	Daiei/SoftBank	IF	NPB All-Star Series (2012); Japan Series Outstanding Player Award (2015)
2004	2005	Lindsay Gulin	United States	2	Daiei/SoftBank	P	
2004 & 2012	2010 & 2016	Keisuke Kaneko	Japan	12	Daiei/SoftBank	IF	
2004	2018	Ryuma Kidokoro	Japan	15	Daiei/SoftBank	OF	
2004	2012	Takahiro Mahara	Japan	9	Daiei/SoftBank	P	Pacific League Saves Leader (2007)
2004	2004	Héctor Mercado	Puerto Rico	1	Daiei	P	Former MLB player.
2004	2010	Koji Mise	Japan	7	Daiei/SoftBank	P	Pacific League Rookie of the Year Award (2004); Pacific League Saves Leader (2004)
2004	2006	Katsuhiko Miyaji	Japan	3	Daiei/SoftBank	OF	Pacific League Best Nine Award (2005)
2004	2004	Brad Voyles	United States	1	Daiei	P	
2005	2005	Tony Batista	Dominican Republic	1	SoftBank	3B	Former MLB player.
2005	2006	Jolbert Cabrera	Colombia	2	SoftBank	2B	Former MLB player.
2005	2019	Tomoaki Egawa	Japan	15	SoftBank	OF	
2005	2005	Pedro Feliciano	Puerto Rico	1	SoftBank	P	Former MLB player.
2005	2006	Tatsuya Ide	Japan	2	SoftBank	OF	Mitsui Golden Glove Award (1997, 2002); NPB All-Star Series (1997, 2001)
2005	2008	Naoyuki Ohmura	Japan	4	SoftBank	OF	Pacific League Hitting Leader (2006)
2005	2011	Toru Takahashi	Japan	7	SoftBank	P	
2006	2010	Yuta Arakawa	Japan	5	SoftBank	C	
2006	2006	D. J. Carrasco	United States	1	SoftBank	P	Former MLB player.
2006	2013	Yoshiaki Fujioka	Japan	8	SoftBank	P	
2006	2018	Yuichi Honda	Japan	13	SoftBank	2B	Pacific League Stolen bases Leader (2010,2011); Mitsui Golden Glove Award (2011‐2012)
2006	2013	Keisuke Katto	Japan	8	SoftBank	P	
2006	2011	Yusuke Kosai	Japan	6	SoftBank	OF	
2006	2022	Nobuhiro Matsuda	Japan	17	SoftBank	3B	Pacific League Best nine Award (2018); Mitsui Golden Glove Award (2011,2013‐2019)
2006	2009	Michitaka Nishiyama	Japan	4	SoftBank	P	
2006	2013	Hidenori Tanoue	Japan	8	SoftBank	C	Pacific League Best Nine Award (2009)
2006	2016	Akihiro Yanase	Japan	11	SoftBank	P	
2006	2013	Yang Yao-hsun	Taiwan	8	SoftBank	P	
2007	2007	Brian Buchanan	United States	1	SoftBank	OF	Former MLB player.
2007	2019	Shuhei Fukuda	Japan	13	SoftBank	OF	
2007	2008	Rick Guttormson	United States	2	SoftBank	P	
2007	2021	Yuya Hasegawa	Japan	15	SoftBank	OF	Pacific League Batting Leader (2013); Pacific League Hitting Leader (2013)
2007	2007	Adam Hyzdu	United States	1	SoftBank	OF	
2007	2016	Masahiko Morifuku	Japan	10	SoftBank	P	NPB All-Star Series (2011.2012)
2007	2008	C. J. Nitkowski	United States	2	SoftBank	P	
2007	2017	Kenji Otonari	Japan	11	SoftBank	P	NPB All-Star Series (2012)
2007 & 2014	2008 & 2015	Jason Standridge	United States	4	SoftBank	P	Former MLB player.
2007	2021	Hiroaki Takaya	Japan	15	SoftBank	C	
2007	2012	Hitoshi Tamura	Japan	6	SoftBank	OF	Pacific League Best Nine Award (2010)
2007	2017	Hiroki Yamada	Japan	11	SoftBank	P	
2008	2021	Sho Iwasaki	Japan	14	SoftBank	P	Pacific League Holds Leader (2017); Currently with Orix Buffaloes.
2008	2011	D. J. Houlton	United States	4	SoftBank	P	Pacific League The Most Wins Champion (2011)
2008	2008	Tetsuya Matoyama	Japan	1	SoftBank	C	
2008	2026	Akira Nakamura	Japan	19	SoftBank	OF	Pacific League Hits Leader (2014). 4× Pacific League Golden Glove Award. Japan Series Outstanding Player Award (2020).
2008	2015	Shota Oba	Japan	8	SoftBank	P	
2008	2008	Jeremy Powell	United States	1	SoftBank	P	
2008	2008	Michael Restovich	United States	1	SoftBank	OF	
2009	2009	Chris Aguila	United States	1	SoftBank	OF	
2009	2013	Brian Falkenborg	United States	4	SoftBank	P	Pacific League Best relief pitcher (2010)
2009	2009	Justin Germano	United States	1	SoftBank	P	Former MLB player.
2009	2009	Kameron Loe	United States	1	SoftBank	P	Former MLB player.
2009	2015	Kim Mu-young	South Korea	7	SoftBank	P	
2009	2021	Akira Niho	Japan	13	SoftBank	P	
2009	2011	José Ortiz	Dominican Republic	3	SoftBank	2B	
2009	2018	Tadashi Settsu	Japan	10	SoftBank	P	Pacific League Rookie of the Year Award (2009); Eiji Sawamura Award (2012)
2009	2012	Soichiro Tateoka	Japan	4	SoftBank	OF	
2009	2016	Shingo Tatsumi	Japan	8	SoftBank	P	
2010	2010	Lee Bum-ho	South Korea	1	SoftBank	3B	
2010	2010	J. D. Durbin	United States	1	SoftBank	P	
2010	2013	Takehito Kanazawa	Japan	4	SoftBank	P	
2010	2021	Hiroyuki Kawahara	Japan	12	SoftBank	P	
2010	2010	Roberto Petagine	Venezuela	1	SoftBank	1B	Central League Home runs Leader (1999, 2001); Central League MVP Award (2001)
2010	2011	Masaumi Shimizu	Japan	2	SoftBank	C	
2010	2012	Teruaki Yoshikawa	Japan	3	SoftBank	P	
2011	2016	Edison Barrios	Venezuela	6	SoftBank	P	
2011	2011	Yhency Brazobán	Dominican Republic	1	SoftBank	P	Former MLB player.
2011	2012	Alex Cabrera	Venezuela	2	SoftBank	1B	Pacific League Home runs Leader (2002); Pacific League MVP Award (2002)
2011	2011	Soichi Fujita	Japan	1	SoftBank	P	Pacific League Hold Champion (2000); NPB All-Star Series (2001)
2011	2016	Toru Hosokawa	Japan	6	SoftBank	C	Pacific League Best Nine Award (2008,2011); Mitsui Golden Glove Award (2008,2011)
2011	2024	Takuya Kai	Japan	14	SoftBank	C	Japan Series champion (2014–2015, 2017–2020); Japan Series MVP (2018). Pacific League Golden Glove Award (2017–2022); Pacific League Best Nine Award (2017, 2020, 2022). Currently with Yomiuri Giants.
2011	2011	Anthony Lerew	United States	1	SoftBank	P	Former MLB player.
2011	2022	Kodai Senga	Japan	12	SoftBank	P	Pacific League strikeout leader. (2019,2020); Pacific League ERA leader. (2020). Pacific League winning percentage leader.(2017); Pacific League wins champion. (2020). Currently with New York Mets.
2011	2020	Seiichi Uchikawa	Japan	10	SoftBank	1B	Central League & Pacific League Batting Leader (2008,2011); Central League & Pacific League Hitting Leader (2008,2012)
2011	2017	Ayatsugu Yamashita	Japan	7	SoftBank	C	
2012	2012	Brandon Allen	United States	1	SoftBank	1B	
2012	2012	Ángel Castro	Dominican Republic	1	SoftBank	P	
2012	2012	Terry Doyle	United States	1	SoftBank	P	
2012	2015	Kazuyuki Hoashi	Japan	4	SoftBank	P	NPB All-Star Series (2005.2008)
2012	2021	Go Kamamoto	Japan	10	SoftBank	OF	
2012	2014	Kyohei Kamezawa	Japan	3	SoftBank	IF	
2012	2023	Shinya Kayama	Japan	12	SoftBank	P	
2012 & 2012	2014 & 2014	Hideki Okajima	Japan	2	SoftBank	P	Former MLB player. MLB Rookie of the Month Award (April 2007)
2012	2013	Wily Mo Peña	Dominican Republic	2	SoftBank	OF	Former MLB player.
2012	2012	Brad Penny	United States	1	SoftBank	P	
2012	2012	Renyel Pinto	Venezuela	1	SoftBank	P	
2012	2012	Levi Romero	Venezuela	1	SoftBank	P	
2012	2015	Naoki Shirane	Japan	4	SoftBank	OF	
2012	2025	Shota Takeda	Japan	14	SoftBank	P	Pacific League Excellent rookie award (2012). Currently with SSG Landers.
2013	2014	Shintaro Ejiri	Japan	2	SoftBank	P	
2013	2018	Ryota Igarashi	Japan	6	SoftBank	P	Former MLB player. Central League Saves Leader (2004)
2013	2018	Yuya Iida	Japan	6	SoftBank	P	
2013	2013	Bryan LaHair	United States	1	SoftBank	1B	Former MLB player.
2013	2022	Yusuke Masago	Japan	10	SoftBank	OF	
2013	2013	Vicente Padilla	Nicaragua	1	SoftBank	P	Former MLB player.
2013	2022	Tomoki Takata	Japan	10	SoftBank	IF	
2013	2013	Shogo Yamamoto	Japan	1	SoftBank	P	
2013	2014	Hirofumi Yamanaka	Japan	2	SoftBank	P	
2013	2018	Yuki Yoshimura	Japan	6	SoftBank	OF	
2013	2013	Makoto Yoshino	Japan	1	SoftBank	P	
2014	2016	Bárbaro Cañizares	Cuba	3	SoftBank	1B	
2014	2015	Ryo Hidaka	Japan	2	SoftBank	P	
2014	2015	Takeshi Hosoyamada	Japan	2	SoftBank	C	
2014	2024	Shuta Ishikawa	Japan	11	SoftBank	P	Pacific League winning percentage leader (2020). Pacific League the most wins Champion (2020). Pitched a no-hitter on August 18, 2023. Currently with Chiba Lotte Marines.
2014	2020	Ren Kajiya	Japan	7	SoftBank	P	Currently with Tohoku Rakuten Golden Eagles.
2014	2021	Keizo Kawashima	Japan	8	SoftBank	IF	
2014	2015	Dae-ho Lee	South Korea	2	SoftBank	1B	Pacific League RBI Leader (2012)
2014	2023	Yuito Mori	Japan	10	SoftBank	P	NPB All-Star (2015,2018). Pacific League Saves leader (2018).
2014	2019	Kenichi Nakata	Japan	6	SoftBank	P	
2014	2019	Ken Okamoto	Japan	6	SoftBank	P	
2014	2021	Dennis Sarfate	United States	8	SoftBank	P	Former MLB player. Pacific League Saves Leader (2015, 2016, 2017)
2014	2017	Kaisei Sone	Japan	4	SoftBank	IF	
2014	2018	Shinya Tsuruoka	Japan	5	SoftBank	C	Pacific League Best Nine Award (2012)
2014	2023	Seiji Uebayashi	Japan	10	SoftBank	P	NPB All-Star (2017); Currently with Chunichi Dragons.
2014	2015	Brian Wolfe	United States	2	SoftBank	P	
2015	2024	Shunsuke Kasaya	Japan	10	SoftBank	P	Currently with Oita B-rings.
2015	2017	Daisuke Matsuzaka	Japan	3	SoftBank	P	Former MLB player. Eiji Sawamura Award (2001); Pacific League The Most Wins Champion (1999–2001)
2015	2020	Rick van den Hurk	Netherlands	6	SoftBank	P	Former MLB player. Japan Series Outstanding Player Award (2015).
2016	2018	Kenta Chatani	Japan	3	SoftBank	IF	Currently with Chiba Lotte Marines.
2016	2020	Reiji Kozawa	Japan	5	SoftBank	P	Currently with Tokyo Yakult Swallows.
2016	2022	Kenta Kurose	Japan	7	SoftBank	IF	
2016	2019	Robert Suárez	Venezuela	4	SoftBank	P	Central League Saves Leader (2020); Currently with Atlanta Braves.
2016	2023	Jumpei Takahashi	Japan	8	SoftBank	P	
2017	2019	Oscar Colas	Cuba	3	SoftBank	OF	Currently with Saraperos de Saltillo
2017	2023	Alfredo Despaigne	Cuba	7	SoftBank	OF	Pacific League Best Nine Award (2017, 2019)
2017	2021	Yuto Furuya	Japan	5	SoftBank	P	
2017	2023	Ryuhei Kuki	Japan	7	SoftBank	C	Currently with Yokohama DeNA BayStars.
2017	2019	Hiroki Hasegawa	Japan	3	SoftBank	P	Currently with Tokyo Yakult Swallows.
2017	2024	Masaki Mimori	Japan	8	SoftBank	IF	Currently with Yokohama DeNA BayStars.
2017	2017	Kyle Jensen	United States	1	SoftBank	1B	
2017	2022	Seigi Tanaka	Japan	6	SoftBank	P	Currently with Hokkaido Nippon-Ham Fighters.
2018	2022	Yurisbel Gracial	Cuba	5	SoftBank	3B	Japan Series Most Valuable Player Award. (2019)
2018	2019	Tomoya Ichikawa	Japan	2	SoftBank	C	
2018	2023	Shu Masuda	Japan	6	SoftBank	IF, OF	Currently with Tokyo Yakult Swallows.
2018	2020	Ryoma Matsuda	Japan	3	SoftBank	P	
2018	2019	Ariel Miranda	Cuba	2	SoftBank	P	Former MLB player.
2018	2020	Tetsuro Nishida	Japan	3	SoftBank	SS	
2018	2026	Shuto Ogata	Japan	9	SoftBank	P	Currently with Yokohama DeNA BayStars.
2018	2022	Kotaro Otake	Japan	5	SoftBank	P	Currently with Hanshin Tigers.
2018	2023	Arata Shiino	Japan	6	SoftBank	P	
2018	2025	Richard	Japan	8	SoftBank	IF	Currently with Yomiuri Giants.
2018	2023	Rei Takahashi	Japan	6	SoftBank	P	NPB All-Star (2019); Pacific League Rookie of the Year (2019); Currently with Saitama Seibu Lions.
2018	2025	Fumimaru Taura	Japan	8	SoftBank	P	
2018	2021	Yuta Watanabe	Japan	4	SoftBank	P	
2019	2025	Yugo Bandoh	Japan	7	SoftBank	P	Currently with Yomiuri Giants.
2019	2023	Keisuke Izumi	Japan	5	SoftBank	P	Currently with the Yomiuri Giants.
2019	2023	Hiroshi Kaino	Japan	5	SoftBank	P	Currently with the Saitama Seibu Lions.
2019	2024	Daiju Nomura	Japan	6	SoftBank	IF	Currently with Saitama Seibu Lions
2019	2023	Masato Okumura	Japan	5	SoftBank	P	
2019	2023	Shun Mizutani	Japan	5	SoftBank	OF	Currently with Hokkaido Nippon-Ham Fighters
2020	2021	Wladimir Balentien	Netherlands	2	SoftBank	OF	Central League home run leader (2011–2013); Central League Best Nine Award (2012–2013).
2020	2020	Matt Moore	United States	1	SoftBank	P	MLB All-Star Game (2013); Currently with Kansas City Royals.
2020	2025	Naoki Satoh	Japan	6	SoftBank	OF	Currently with Tohoku Rakuten Golden Eagles.
2021	2021	Dariel Álvarez	Cuba	1	SoftBank	OF	Currently with Mariachis de Guadalajara.
2021	2026	Tomoya Inoue	Japan	6	SoftBank	IF	Currently with Yokohama DeNA BayStars.
2021	2021	Nick Martinez	United States	1	SoftBank	P	MLB player. Currently with Tampa Bay Rays.
2021	2024	Ryota Nakamura	Japan	4	SoftBank	P	Currently with Chiba Lotte Marines.
2021	2022	Masahiro Nakatani	Japan	2	SoftBank	OF	
2022	2022	Ryo Akiyoshi	Japan	1	SoftBank	P	NPB All-Star Game (2016).
2022	2022	Tyler Chatwood	United States	1	SoftBank	P	MLB player.
2022	2023	Freddy Galvis	Venezuela	2	SoftBank	SS	MLB player.
2022	2025	Katsuki Matayoshi	Japan	4	SoftBank	P	
2022	2024	Mizuki Miura	Japan	3	SoftBank	P	Currently with Chunichi Dragons.
2022	2024	Keisuke Nakata	Japan	3	SoftBank	IF	Currently with Saitama Seibu Lions.
2023	2025	Kohei Arihara	Japan	3	SoftBank	P	Former MLB player. Pacific League wins leader (2019, 2024 , 2025).
2023	2023	Willians Astudillo	Venezuela	1	SoftBank	3B	Former MLB player.
2023	2024	Yuri Furukawa	Japan	2	SoftBank	P	
2023	2023	Joe Gunkel	United States	1	SoftBank	P	
2023	2023	Courtney Hawkins	United States	1	SoftBank	OF	
2023	2024	Kengo Yoshida	Japan	2	SoftBank	C	Currently with Hokkaido Nippon-Ham Fighters.
2023	2024	Yuki Watanabe	Japan	2	SoftBank	P	
2024	2024	Takuya Kuwahara	Japan	1	SoftBank	P	
2024	2024	Adam Walker	United States	1	SoftBank	OF	Former MLB player.C. urrently with Rakuten Monkeys.
2025	2025	Haruhiro Hamaguchi	Japan	1	SoftBank	P	

==== Retired numbers ====
- none

==== Honored numbers ====
- 15 (Japan) Masao Fujii
- 89 (Taiwan) Sadaharu Oh

Sadaharu Oh's 89 was originally planned to be retired or honored after his retirement, but Oh made clear his preference to give the number to his successor. Ultimately, however, the man who replaced him as manager of the Hawks, Akiyama, declined to wear the number on the grounds that the honor of bearing it would be too great so shortly after Oh's departure. Instead, Akiyama wore the number 81.

== Managers ==
No.	Years in office	YR	Managers	G	W	L	T	Win%	Pacific League championships	Japan Series championships	Playoff berths
1	1938	1	Kazuo Takasu (1st)	40	11	26	3	.297			
2	1939	1	Kazuo Takasu (1st); Hachiro Mimachi (1st)	96	40	50	6	.444			
3	1940	1	Kazuo Takasu (2nd)	105	28	71	6	.283			
4	1941	1	Hachiro Mimachi (2nd)	84	43	41	0	.512			
5	1942	1	Hachiro Mimachi (2nd); Kisaku Kato (1st)	105	49	56	0	.467			
6	1943	1	Tatsuo Takata; Kisaku Kato (2nd)	84	26	56	2	.317			
7	1944	1	Kisaku Kato (2nd)	35	11	23	1	.324			
8	1946–1965	20	Kazuto Tsuruoka (1st)	2,646	1,585	990	71	.616	8 (1951, 1952, 1953, 1955, 1959, 1961, 1964, 1965)	2 (1959, 1964)	
9	1965	0	Kazuo Kageyama^{†}	—	—	—	—	—			
10	1966–1968	3	Kazuto Tsuruoka (2nd)	402	222	168	12	.569	1 (1966)		
11	1969	1	Tokuji Iida	130	50	76	4	.397			
12	1970–1977	8	Katsuya Nomura	1,040	513	472	55	.521	1 (1973)		1 (1973)
13	1978–1980	3	Yoshinori Hirose	390	136	227	27	.375			
14	1981–1982	2	Don Blasingame	260	106	136	18	.438			
15	1983–1985	3	Yoshio Anabuki	390	149	210	31	.415			
16	1986–1989	4	Tadashi Sugiura	520	223	271	26	.451			
17	1990–1992	3	Kōichi Tabuchi	390	151	230	9	.396			
18	1993–1994	2	Rikuo Nemoto	260	114	140	6	.449			
19	1995–2008	14	Sadaharu Oh	1,913	998	877	38	.532	3 (1999, 2000, 2003)	2 (1999, 2003)	4 (2004, 2005, 2006, 2007)
20	2009–2014	6	Koji Akiyama	864	456	368	40	.553	3 (2010, 2011, 2014)	2 (2011, 2014)	5 (2009, 2010, 2011, 2012, 2014)
21	2015–2021	7	Kimiyasu Kudo	978	558	378	42	.596	3 (2015, 2017, 2020)	5 (2015, 2017, 2018, 2019, 2020)	6 (2015, 2016, 2017, 2018, 2019, 2020)
22	2022–2023	2	Hiroshi Fujimoto	286	147	134	5	.523			2 (2022, 2023)
23	2024–present		Hiroki Kokubo	429	269	150	10	.642	3 (2024, 2025, 2026)	2 (2025, 2026)	2 (2024, 2025, 2026)
Totals	88 seasons		19 managers	11,447	5,885	5,150	412	.533	22	13	21

- Statistics current through the end of the 2026 regular season.
- † - Kageyama passed away before ever managing a game, but was named manager before his passing.

== Mascots ==
The Fukuoka SoftBank Hawks have the largest number of mascots in NPB, with a total of twelve active mascots. Nine of them are traditional mascots that are a part of the Hawk Family, with three other miscellaneous traditional mascots. The currently known family members since 1992 are as follows:

- Harry Hawk – a 23-year-old yellow hawk with an orange beak wearing the number 100, Harry supports the team as the main mascot. He is the youngest brother of Homer Hawk, the former main mascot when the team was owned by Daiei. Harry is the only one with a Twitter account.
- Honey Hawk – an 18-year-old pink female hawk. Honey is Harry's girlfriend and the namesake of the Honeys, the Hawks' dancing and cheerleading squad.
- Herculy Hawk – a 23-year-old brown hawk wearing the number 200, Herculy is Harry's teammate as well as his longstanding rival since Hawk University days. Herculy is only seen wearing the team's away jersey, even at home and during special events, such as Hawks Festival or Fight! Kyushu days.
- Honky Hawk – a 57-year-old brown hawk, Honky is Harry's uncle, and the mayor of Hawks Town. He loves baseball and wears a brown fedora.
- Helen Hawk – a 55-year-old female hawk, Helen is Honky's wife. They had eloped during their high school days.
- Hack Hawk – Harry's 7-year-old nephew and the oldest brother of Hock and Rick. Hack wears red-lined T-shirt and the same color cap.
- Rick Hawk – Harry's 5-year-old nephew and middle of Hawk brothers. Rick wears glasses and blue-lined T-shirt and the same color cap.
- Hock Hawk – Harry's 3-year-old nephew and youngest brother of Hack and Rick. Hock wears a green-lined T-shirt and the same color cap.
- Homer Hawk – The original mascot of the Hawks from 1989 to 2004 and the older brother of the team's current mascot Harry.

The Hawks also had two VTuber avatar mascots, named Takamine Umi and Aritaka Hina. Unveiled on November 9, 2020, they have their own YouTube channel as well as their own Twitter profiles. They also made appearances on the PayPay Dome's video board. The two were retired in December 2022.

Temporarily in 2020, the Hawks had 10 Spot robots from Boston Dynamics (at the time SoftBank owned Boston Dynamics) and 10 Pepper robots from SoftBank Robotics to replace the fans during a game against the Eagles due to COVID-19 restrictions in NPB games. They were still used when 5,000 fans were allowed in NPB games as fans were still not allowed to sing or use their voices to make noises, only through clapping or cheering batons.

The Hawks are the only other team, aside from the Fighters, to have a mascot primarily for their second team, and are the only team with one in the Western League (the Fighters' ni-gun team plays out of the Eastern League), in a chick named Hinamaru. He wears the team's cap, and has an eggshell that looks like a baseball.

The Hawks also have a mascot named Fu-san, who is based on a jet balloon that fans launch during the Lucky 7, prior to when the Hawks are up to bat in the 7th inning.

In 2023, in celebration of the team's 85th anniversary and 30th season in the Fukuoka PayPay Dome, the Hawks introduced their twelfth mascot, Barikata-kun, a half-pig, half-human creature with a retractable hairline and sunglasses, inspired by Fukuoka's famous tonkotsu ramen.

== MLB players ==
Retired/Former:

- Masanori Murakami (1964–1965)
- Tadahito Iguchi (2005–2008)
- Kenji Johjima (2006–2009)
- Munenori Kawasaki (2012–2016)
- Tsuyoshi Wada (2014–2015)
- Naoyuki Uwasawa（2024）

Active:

- Kodai Senga (2023–present)

Note: The Hawks are the only team in NPB to have never posted a player under the current posting system implemented in 1998.
