= Tetsuya Matoyama =

Japanese baseball player (born 1970)

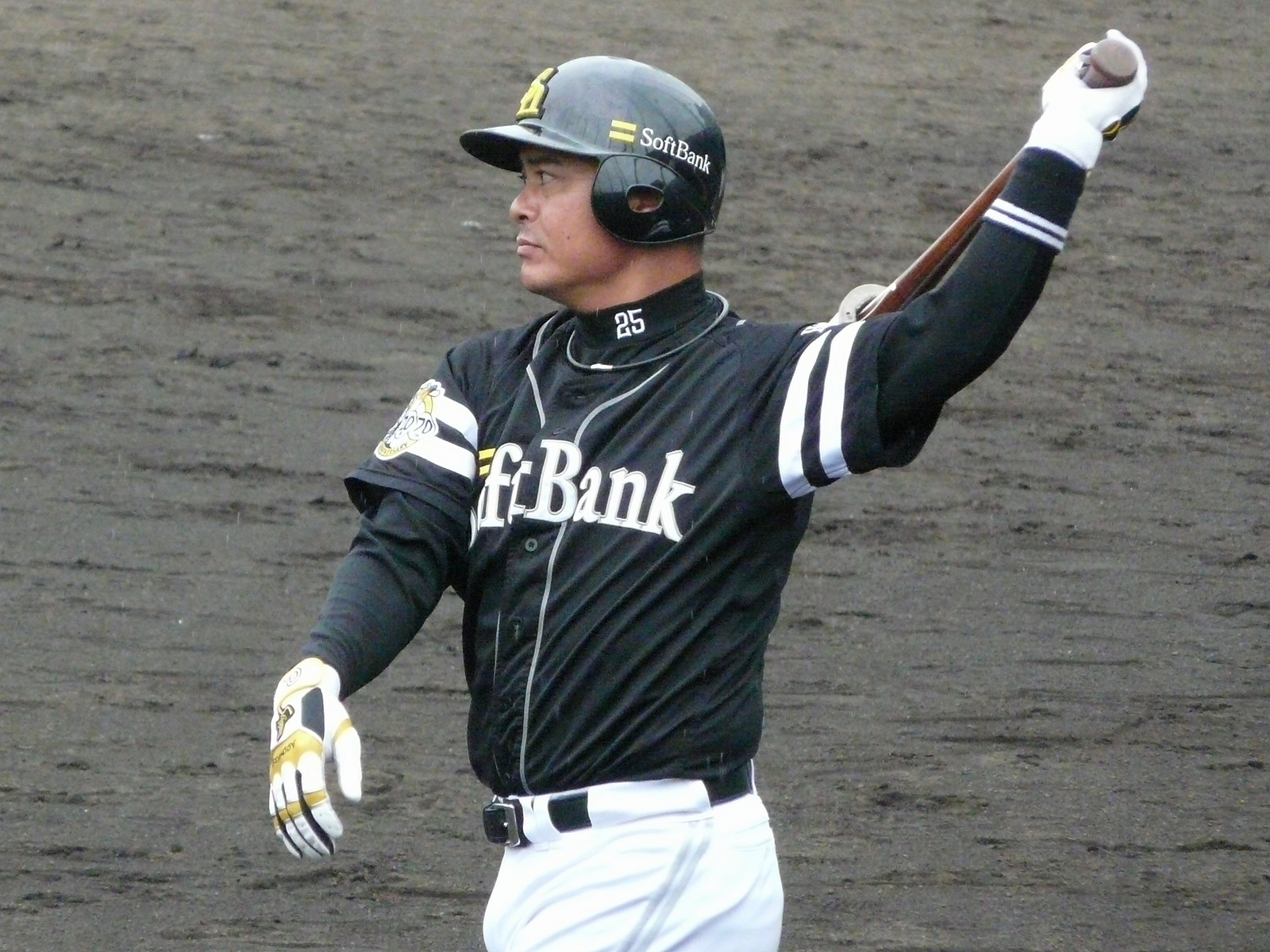
- Matoyama with the Fukuoka SoftBank Hawks

Fubon Guardians
- Catcher / Coach
- Born: October 1, 1970 (age 56); Himeji, Hyōgo
- Batted: Right Threw: Right

NPB debut
- July 13, 1994, for the Kintetsu Buffaloes

Last NPB appearance
- July 2, 2008, for the Fukuoka SoftBank Hawks

NPB statistics
- Batting average: .206
- Hits: 423
- Runs batted in: 201
- Stats at Baseball Reference

Teams
- As player: Kintetsu Buffaloes Osaka Kintetsu Buffaloes (1994–2004); Orix Buffaloes (2005–2007); Fukuoka SoftBank Hawks (2008); As coach: Fukuoka SoftBank Hawks (2009–2025); Fubon Guardians (2026–present)

Career highlights and awards
- As coach: Japan Series champion (2025)
- Last updated on: November 10, 2012

Tetsuya Matoyama (Japanese: 的山 哲也, born October 1, 1970) is a Japanese former professional baseball catcher, and current fourth squad battery coach for the Fukuoka SoftBank Hawks of Nippon Professional Baseball (NPB). He played in NPB for the Osaka Kintetsu Buffaloes, Orix Buffaloes, and Fukuoka SoftBank Hawks.

== Professional career ==
=== Active player era ===
On November 20, 1993, Matoyama was drafted fourth round pick by the Kintetsu Buffaloes in the 1993 Nippon Professional Baseball draft.

He made his debut in the Pacific League in 1994 appearing in one game. And he played 117 games in the 1999 season, his most ever.

The 2004 Nippon Professional Baseball realignment eliminated the Osaka Kintetsu Buffaloes, and he became a member of the Orix Buffaloes in the distribution draft.

He played three seasons with the Orix Buffaloes before moving to the Fukuoka Softbank Hawks for the 2008 season and retiring that offseason.

Matoyama played in 1026 games during his 15-season career, and recorded batting average .206 with 423 hits, 40 home runs, and 201 RBI.

=== After retirement ===
After his retirement, Matoyama has served as the first squad battery coach for the Fukuoka Softbank Hawks since the 2009 season.

Starting with the 2013 season, he moved to the second squad battery coach position, then back to first squad battery coach for the 2015 season, and third squad battery coach for the 2016 season.

In addition, he was in charge of the second squad battery coach from the 2017 season and the third squad battery coach from the 2022 season.

He served as the first squad battery coach for the third time during the 2023 season.

On December 2, 2023, he was transferred to the fourth squad battery coach.
