= Toru Takahashi (baseball) =

Japanese baseball player (born 1987)

Toru Takahashi 高橋徹
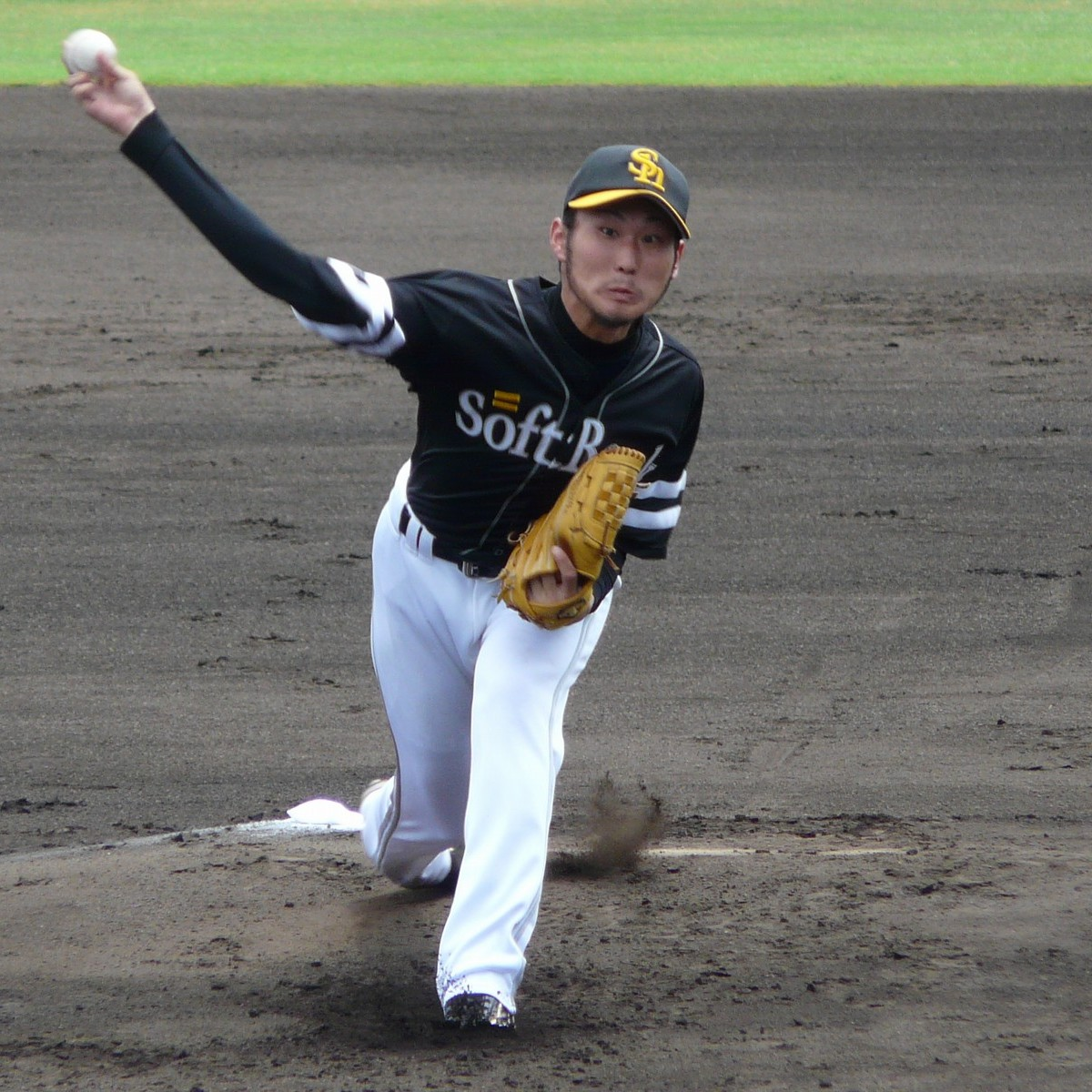
- Takahashi at the Hanshin Naruohama Stadium, July 15, 2009
- Pitcher
- Born: February 23, 1987 (age 39); Yokosuka, Kanagawa, Japan
- Bats: Right-handed Throws: Right-handed

NPB debut
- April 28, 2010, for the Fukuoka SoftBank Hawks

NPB statistics
- Win–loss record: 0–0
- Earned run average: 3.86
- Strikeouts: 1
- Stats at Baseball Reference

Teams
- Fukuoka SoftBank Hawks (2005–2011)

Toru Takahashi (高橋 徹, Takahashi Tōru; born February 23, 1987) is a former Japanese professional baseball pitcher who played for the Fukuoka SoftBank Hawks in Nippon Professional Baseball's Pacific League.

== Early life ==
Born in Yokosuka, Kanagawa, Takahashi attended Otsu Junior High School and Yokohama So-Gakukan High School. He was selected in the third-round of the 2004 draft by the (then named) Fukuoka Daiei Hawks.

== Professional career ==
Takahashi spent seven years with the Hawks organization. In 2010, the sixth year of his professional career, he received a call-up to the club's first team and made his debut appearance on April 28, 2010, against the Tohoku Rakuten Golden Eagles. He pitched the 9th innings and allowed one run. He made his second (and final) first-team appearance on May 10, 2010, against the Orix Buffaloes. He pitched 1 1/3 innings and struck out one batter, T-Okada.

In the 2011 season he pitched well in the farm league, but could not secure a call-up to the first league. He was released by the Hawks in December 2011.

He later announced via his Twitter account that he was retiring from professional baseball.
