= Masashi Arikura =

Japanese baseball player (born 1967)

Personal information
- Full name: Masashi Arikura
- Nationality: Japanese
- Born: June 12, 1967 (age 59) Uekawa-gun, Japan
- Height: 1.88 m (6 ft 2 in)
- Weight: 87 kg (192 lb)

Sport
- Country: Japan

Masashi Arikura (有倉 雅史, born June 12, 1967) is a Japanese former professional baseball pitcher. He played for the Nippon-Ham Fighters from 1990 to 1994, the Fukuoka Daiei Hawks in 1996 and 1997, and the Hanshin Tigers in 1998.
