= Hiroyuki Kawahara =

Japanese baseball player

- Pitcher
- Born: August 23, 1991 (age 35); Fukuoka, Fukuoka, Japan
- Batted: Left Threw: Left

NPB debut
- May 20, 2012, for the Fukuoka SoftBank Hawks

Last NPB appearance
- April 3, 2021, for the Fukuoka SoftBank Hawks

NPB statistics (through 2021 season)
- Win–loss record: 0-0
- ERA: 2.88
- Holds: 5
- Strikeouts: 31
- Stats at Baseball Reference

Teams
- Fukuoka SoftBank Hawks (2010–2021)

Career highlights and awards
- 1× Japan Series Champion (2019)

Hiroyuki Kawahara (川原 弘之, Kawahara Hiroyuki; born August 23, 1991) is a Japanese professional baseball pitcher for the Fukuoka SoftBank Hawks in Japan's Nippon Professional Baseball.

== Professional career ==
On October 29, 2009, Kawahara was drafted by the Fukuoka SoftBank Hawks in the 2009 Nippon Professional Baseball draft.

=== 2010–2020 season ===
In 2010 - 2011 season, Kawahara played in the Western League of NPB's second league and played in informal matches against the Shikoku Island League Plus's teams.

In 2012 season, in the match against the Yomiuri Giants in the Interleague play on May 20, 2012, he debuted as a relief pitcher and pitched two games in the Pacific League.

In 2013 season, Kawahara only pitched one game in the Interleague play.

In 2014 season, Kawahara had no chance to pitch in the Pacific League.

In 2015 season, Kawahara had a left shoulder surgery on March 24 and Tommy John surgery on November 25. Since rehabilitation is expected to require more than a year, he left the active roster and signed as a developmental player on December 17.

In 2016 season, Kawahara spent the season rehabilitating his left elbow.

On June 10, 2017, Kawahara threw in a practice game for the first time in two years and eight months. From 2017 season to 2018 season, he played in informal matches against Shikoku Island League Plus's teams and amateur baseball teams, and played in the Western League of NPB's minor leagues.

On March 26, 2019, Kawahara signed a 5 million yen contract with the Fukuoka SoftBank Hawks as a registered player under control. On March 30, he pitched in the Pacific League for the first time in six years and recorded his first Hold. In 2019 season, he recorded with a 19 Games pitched, a 0–0 Win–loss record, a 2.66 ERA, a one Holds, a 10 strikeouts in 23.2 innings. In the 2019 Japan Series against the Yomiuri Giants, he was selected as the Japan Series roster.

In the match against the Hokkaido Nippon-Ham Fighters on July 2, 2020, Kawahara pitched as a relief pitcher in a bases-loaded, a two-out situation and recorded a hold. In 2020 season, he recorded with a 22 Games pitched, a 0–0 Win–loss record, a 2.00 ERA, a 4 Holds, a 15 strikeouts in 18 innings.
