= 2008 Hokkaido Nippon-Ham Fighters season =

Baseball event

2008 Hokkaido Nippon-Ham Fighters
- Climax Series berth
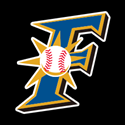
- League: Pacific League
- Ballpark: Sapporo Dome
- Record: 73–69–2 (.514)
- League place: 3rd
- Parent company: Nippon Ham
- President: Junichi Fujii
- Manager: Masataka Nashida
- Captain: Makoto Kaneko

The 2008 Hokkaido Nippon-Ham Fighters season was the 63rd season of the Hokkaido Nippon-Ham Fighters franchise. The Fighters played the majority of their home games at Sapporo Dome in the city of Sapporo, as well as at Tokyo Dome in Tokyo as members of Nippon Professional Baseball's Pacific League. The team was led by Masataka Nashida on his first season as team manager.

Nippon-Ham finished the season in third place with a record of 73–69–2, qualifying them for the Climax Series. In the 2008 Pacific League Climax Series, the Fighters defeated the Orix Buffaloes in the First Stage, but were eliminated by the Saitama Seibu Lions in the Second Stage.

== Regular season ==
=== Standings ===
Pacific League regular season standings
Pos	Team	Pld	W	L	T	GB	PCT	Home	Away
1	Saitama Seibu Lions	144	76	64	4	—	.542	44–27–1	32–37–3
2	Orix Buffaloes	144	75	68	1	5.5	.524	41–31–0	34–37–1
**3**	Hokkaido Nippon-Ham Fighters	**144**	**73**	**69**	**2**	**6**	.514	**41–30–1**	**32–39–1**
4	Chiba Lotte Marines	144	73	70	1	7.5	.510	41–30–1	32–40–0
5	Tohoku Rakuten Golden Eagles	144	65	76	3	12.5	.462	37–34–1	28–42–2
6	Fukuoka SoftBank Hawks	144	64	77	3	13.5	.455	36–33–3	28–44–0

=== Interleague ===
Team	Pld	HW	HL	AW	AL	GB	PCT
Fukuoka SoftBank Hawks	24	10	2	5	7	—	.625
Hanshin Tigers	24	10	2	5	7	—	.625
Hokkaido Nippon-Ham Fighters	**24**	**8**	**4**	**6**	**6**	**1**	.583
Yomiuri Giants	24	9	3	5	7	1	.583
Tohoku Rakuten Golden Eagles	24	6	6	7	5	2	.542
Hiroshima Toyo Carp	24	6	6	7	5	2	.542
Chunichi Dragons	24	8	4	4	8	3	.500
Orix Buffaloes	24	6	6	5	7	4	.458
Tokyo Yakult Swallows	24	4	8	7	5	4	.458
Chiba Lotte Marines	24	6	6	4	8	5	.417
Saitama Seibu Lions	24	7	5	3	9	5	.417
Yokohama BayStars	24	5	7	1	11	9	.250

Updated to match(es) played on compute. Source:
Rules for classification: Whenever multiple teams have same number of wins, the team having better standings in last year's interleague games will have advantage, thus Fukuoka SoftBank Hawks won the interleague title, despite Hanshin Tigers beating the Hawks 3 out of 4 games. A similar rule applies to other teams tied in wins.

=== Record vs. opponents ===
2008 record vs. opponents
Team	Central League opponents						Pacific League opponents					
Team	BayStars	Carp	Dragons	Giants	Swallows	Tigers	Buffaloes	Eagles	Fighters	Hawks	Lions	Marines
BayStars	—	11–13	7–17	5–18–1	9–15	10–13–1	1–3	0–4	1–3	0–4	2–2	2–2
Carp	13–11	—	9–13–2	12–10–2	12–11–1	10–14	2–2	2–2	2–2	1–3	3–1	3–1
Dragons	17–7	13–9–2	—	14–10	9–13–2	6–17–1	1–3	2–2	1–3	2–2	3–1	3–1
Giants	18–5–1	10–12–2	10–14	—	18–6	14–10	3–1	2–2	3–1	1–3	1–3	4–0
Swallows	15–9	11–12–1	13–9–2	6–18	—	10–13–1	3–1	2–2	1–3	2–2	2–2	1–3
Tigers	13–10–1	14–10	17–6–1	10–14	13–10–1	—	3–1	3–1	2–2	3–1	3–1	1–3
Buffaloes	3–1	2–2	3–1	1–3	1–3	1–3	—	13–10–1	13–11	14–10	10–14	14–10
Eagles	4–0	2–2	2–2	2–2	2–2	1–3	10–13–1	—	13–10–1	12–12	10–14	7–16–1
**Fighters**	3–1	2–2	3–1	1–3	3–1	2–2	11–13	10–13–1	—	17–7	9–14–1	12–12
Hawks	4–0	3–1	2–2	3–1	2–2	1–3	10–14	12–12	7–17	—	10–11–3	10–14
Lions	2–2	1–3	1–3	3–1	2–2	1–3	14–10	14–10	14–9–1	11–10–3	—	13–11
Marines	2–2	1–3	1–3	0–4	3–1	3–1	10–14	16–7–1	12–12	14–10	11–13	—

=== Opening Day roster ===
Thursday, March 20, 2008, vs. Chiba Lotte Marines

Order	Player	Pos.
1	Hichori Morimoto	CF
2	Kensuke Tanaka	2B
3	Atsunori Inaba	RF
4	Terrmel Sledge	1B
5	Eiichi Koyano	3B
6	Yoshio Itoi	LF
7	Tomochika Tsuboi	DH
8	Shinya Tsuruoka	C
9	Makoto Kaneko	SS
—	Yu Darvish	P

=== Game log ===
2008 game log: 73–69–2 (Home: 41–30–1; Away: 32–39–1)
March: 3–5–0 (Home: 3–3–0; Away: 0–2–0)

#	Date	Opponent	Score	Win	Loss	Save	Stadium	Attendance	Record	Streak
1	March 20	Marines	1–0	**Darvish** (1–0)	Kobayashi (0–1)	—	Sapporo Dome	42,126	1–0–0	W1
2	March 22	Marines	2–3	Naruse (1–0)	**Sakamoto** (0–1)	—	Sapporo Dome	31,028	1–1–0	L1
3	March 23	Marines	1–4	Watanabe (1–0)	**Glynn** (0–1)	Takagi (1)	Sapporo Dome	32,215	1–2–0	L2
4	March 25	Lions	9–1	**Takeda** (1–0)	Nishiguchi (0–1)	—	Sapporo Dome	16,410	2–2–0	W1
5	March 26	Lions	0–8	Kishi (1–0)	**Yoshikawa** (0–1)	—	Sapporo Dome	19,206	2–3–0	L1
6	March 27	Lions	1–0 (10)	**Takeda** (1–0)	Wakui (0–2)	—	Sapporo Dome	25,011	3–3–0	W1
7	March 29	@ Eagles	2–7	Tanaka (1–0)	**Hoshino** (0–1)	—	Kleenex Stadium	20,189	3–4–0	L1
8	March 30	@ Eagles	1–3	Asai (1–1)	**Glynn** (0–2)	Aoyama (1)	Kleenex Stadium	19,518	3–5–0	L2

April: 14–10–1 (Home: 7–2–0; Away: 7–8–1)

#	Date	Opponent	Score	Win	Loss	Save	Stadium	Attendance	Record	Streak
9	April 1	@ Hawks	6–0	**Takeda** (2–0)	Arakaki (0–1)	—	Yahoo Dome	29,204	4–5–0	W1
10	April 2	@ Hawks	0–9	Otonari (2–0)	**Yoshikawa** (0–2)	—	Kitakyushu Stadium	17,721	4–6–0	L1
11	April 3	@ Hawks	6–2	**Darvish** (2–0)	Guttormson (0–1)	—	Yahoo Dome	32,144	5–6–0	W1
12	April 4	@ Buffaloes	3–2	**Sweeney** (1–0)	Kamoshida (0–1)	**Nakamura** (1)	Kyocera Dome	11,738	6–6–0	W2
13	April 5	@ Buffaloes	2–7	Kondo (2–0)	**Fujii** (0–1)	—	Kyocera Dome	18,129	6–7–0	L1
14	April 6	@ Buffaloes	3–2	**Glynn** (1–2)	Kawagoe (1–1)	**Nakamura** (2)	Skymark Stadium	14,111	7–7–0	W1
15	April 8	Eagles	8–7	**Takeda** (3–0)	Lin (0–2)	**Nakamura** (3)	Sapporo Dome	20,257	8–7–0	W2
16	April 9	Eagles	4–2	**Yoshikawa** (1–2)	Nagai (2–1)	**Nakamura** (4)	Sapporo Dome	19,044	9–7–0	W3
17	April 10	Eagles	1–0	**Darvish** (3–0)	Iwakuma (2–1)	—	Sapporo Dome	25,197	10–7–0	W4
18	April 11	@ Marines	3–2	**Sweeney** (2–0)	Kobayashi (1–2)	**Nakamura** (5)	Chiba Marine Stadium	15,161	11–7–0	W5
19	April 12	@ Marines	1–2	Naruse (2–1)	**Miyanishi** (0–1)	—	Chiba Marine Stadium	27,513	11–8–0	L1
20	April 13	@ Marines	1–2 (10)	Watanabe (2–1)	**Takeda** (1–1)	—	Chiba Marine Stadium	16,282	11–9–0	L2
21	April 15	@ Lions	3–3 (12)	Game tied after 12 innings			Seibu Dome	8,397	11–9–1	T1
22	April 16	@ Lions	2–4	Wakui (2–2)	**Yoshikawa** (1–3)	—	Seibu Dome	11,263	11–10–1	L1
23	April 18	Hawks	3–1	**Darvish** (4–0)	Sugiuchi (1–2)	—	Sapporo Dome	18,107	12–10–1	W1
24	April 19	Hawks	4–2	**Fujii** (1–1)	Oba (2–2)	**Nakamura** (6)	Sapporo Dome	27,041	13–10–1	W2
25	April 20	Hawks	2–4	Wada (1–0)	**Glynn** (1–3)	Houlton (2)	Sapporo Dome	30,536	13–11–1	L1
26	April 22	Buffaloes	4–2	**Hoshino** (1–1)	Takagi (1–2)	**Nakamura** (7)	Sapporo Dome	14,253	14–11–1	W1
27	April 23	Buffaloes	0–5	Yamamoto (2–0)	**Sweeney** (2–1)	—	Sapporo Dome	14,358	14–12–1	L1
28	April 24	Buffaloes	3–2 (10)	**Takeda** (2–1)	Kato (0–1)	—	Sapporo Dome	15,644	15–12–1	W1
29	April 25	@ Eagles	1–6	Iwakuma (4–1)	**Yoshikawa** (1–4)	—	Kleenex Stadium	13,213	15–13–1	L1
30	April 26	@ Eagles	0–4	Guzmán (1–2)	**Fujii** (1–2)	—	Kleenex Stadium	16,826	15–14–1	L2
31	April 27	@ Eagles	0–5	Tanaka (3–1)	**Glynn** (1–4)	—	Kleenex Stadium	20,634	15–15–1	L3
32	April 29	@ Marines	3–2	**Nakamura** (1–0)	Sikorski (1–4)	—	Chiba Marine Stadium	30,021	16–15–1	W1
33	April 30	@ Marines	6–3	**Darvish** (5–0)	Watanabe (3–2)	**Nakamura** (8)	Chiba Marine Stadium	17,516	17–15–1	W2

May: 15–9–0 (Home: 10–3–0; Away: 5–6–0)

#	Date	Opponent	Score	Win	Loss	Save	Stadium	Attendance	Record	Streak
34	May 1	@ Marines	6–1	**Yoshikawa** (2–4)	Ono (2–1)	—	Chiba Marine Stadium	17,143	18–15–1	W3
35	May 2	Eagles	5–1	**Tadano** (1–0)	Iwakuma (4–2)	**Nakamura** (9)	Sapporo Dome	41,124	19–15–1	W4
36	May 3	Eagles	12–5	**Sakamoto** (1–1)	Kawagishi (0–1)	—	Sapporo Dome	40,083	20–15–1	W5
37	May 4	Eagles	1–7	Tanaka (4–1)	**Glynn** (1–5)	—	Sapporo Dome	42,126	20–16–1	L1
38	May 5	@ Lions	6–8	Onodera (2–2)	**Takeda** (2–2)	Graman (8)	Seibu Dome	34,783	20–17–1	L2
39	May 6	@ Lions	1–3	Ishii (5–1)	**Miyanishi** (0–2)	—	Seibu Dome	27,340	20–18–1	L3
40	May 7	@ Lions	3–4	Hoshino (2–0)	**Darvish** (5–1)	—	Seibu Dome	15,574	20–19–1	L4
41	May 10	Hawks	0–1	Sugiuchi (3–3)	**Fujii** (1–3)	—	Ocean Stadium	16,822	20–20–1	L5
42	May 11	Hawks	4–3	**Miyanishi** (1–2)	Kume (3–1)	**Nakamura** (10)	Ocean Stadium	17,919	21–20–1	W1
43	May 13	Marines	2–8	Karakawa (3–0)	**Glynn** (1–6)	—	Tokyo Dome	19,828	21–21–1	L1
44	May 14	Marines	4–3 (11)	**Nakamura** (2–0)	Ogino (1–3)	—	Tokyo Dome	22,265	22–21–1	W1
45	May 15	Marines	6–5	**Tateyama** (1–0)	Abreu (1–1)	—	Tokyo Dome	17,368	23–21–1	W2
46	May 16	@ Hawks	10–3	**Tadano** (2–0)	Otonari (3–5)	—	Yahoo Dome	30,948	24–21–1	W3
47	May 17	@ Hawks	2–3	Sugiuchi (4–3)	**Tateyama** (1–1)	—	Yahoo Dome	30,218	24–22–1	L1
48	May 18	@ Hawks	4–3	**Sweeney** (3–1)	Oba (3–4)	**Takeda** (1)	Yahoo Dome	32,494	25–22–1	W1
49	May 20	BayStars	6–3	**Glynn** (2–6)	Nasuno (2–6)	**Takeda** (2)	Sapporo Dome	16,957	26–22–1	W2
50	May 21	BayStars	4–3	**Hoshino** (2–1)	Miura (2–5)	**Takeda** (3)	Sapporo Dome	20,271	27–22–1	W3
51	May 23	Dragons	1–0	**Sakamoto** (2–1)	Kawakami (2–3)	**Takeda** (4)	Sapporo Dome	23,966	28–22–1	W4
52	May 24	Dragons	11–1	**Sweeney** (4–1)	Kawai (1–2)	—	Sapporo Dome	30,983	29–22–1	W5
53	May 25	@ Giants	4–6	Nishimura (6–2)	**Fujii** (1–4)	Kroon (15)	Tokyo Dome	43,813	29–23–1	L1
54	May 26	@ Giants	3–4	Burnside (1–0)	**Glynn** (2–7)	Kroon (16)	Tokyo Dome	39,278	29–24–1	L2
55	May 28	@ Swallows	7–3	**Darvish** (6–1)	Muranaka (3–6)	—	Meiji Jingu Stadium	18,050	30–24–1	W1
56	May 29	@ Swallows	3–2	**Miyanishi** (2–2)	Oshimoto (2–1)	**Takeda** (5)	Meiji Jingu Stadium	9,683	31–24–1	W2
57	May 31	Tigers	2–1	**Sweeney** (5–1)	Iwata (5–2)	**Takeda** (6)	Sapporo Dome	42,126	32–24–1	W3

June: 9–9–0 (Home: 3–4–0; Away: 6–5–0)

#	Date	Opponent	Score	Win	Loss	Save	Stadium	Attendance	Record	Streak
58	June 1	Tigers	4–5 (10)	Kubota (3–1)	**Takeda** (2–3)	Fujikawa (18)	Sapporo Dome	42,126	32–25–1	L1
59	June 3	Carp	4–2	**Glynn** (3–7)	Otake (2–7)	—	Sapporo Dome	17,815	33–25–1	W1
60	June 4	Carp	2–3	Lewis (8–4)	**Darvish** (6–2)	Nagakawa (8)	Sapporo Dome	23,870	33–26–1	L1
61	June 6	@ Dragons	7–3	**Sakamoto** (3–1)	Sato (0–1)	—	Nagoya Dome	36,725	34–26–1	W1
62	June 7	@ Dragons	1–4	Kawakami (4–3)	**Sweeney** (5–2)	Iwase (18)	Nagoya Dome	38,247	34–27–1	L1
63	June 8	@ BayStars	9–3	**Fujii** (2–4)	Nasuno (4–7)	—	Yokohama Stadium	17,842	35–27–1	W1
64	June 9	@ BayStars	3–13	Oyamada (2–3)	**Glynn** (3–8)	—	Yokohama Stadium	9,796	35–28–1	L1
65	June 11	Giants	0–1	Nomaguchi (2–3)	**Darvish** (6–3)	Kroon (18)	Sapporo Dome	35,298	35–29–1	L2
66	June 12	Giants	3–2	**Tadano** (3–0)	Burnside (2–1)	**Nakamura** (11)	Sapporo Dome	30,135	36–29–1	W1
67	June 14	Swallows	2–1 (10)	**Takeda** (3–3)	Lim (1–3)	—	Sapporo Dome	40,058	37–29–1	W2
68	June 15	Swallows	1–3	Muranaka (4–7)	**Glynn** (3–9)	Lim (16)	Sapporo Dome	31,556	37–30–1	L1
69	June 17	@ Carp	8–7	**Darvish** (7–3)	Otake (2–9)	**Nakamura** (12)	Hiroshima Stadium	19,860	38–30–1	W1
70	June 18	@ Carp	1–2	Maeda (1–0)	**Tadano** (3–1)	Nagakawa (12)	Hiroshima Stadium	18,527	38–31–1	L1
71	June 21	@ Tigers	4–0	**Sweeney** (6–2)	Iwata (5–4)	—	Koshien Stadium	43,528	39–31–1	W1
72	June 22	@ Tigers	3–5	Atchison (5–4)	**Glynn** (3–10)	Fujikawa (25)	Koshien Stadium	43,524	39–32–1	L1
73	June 27	@ Buffaloes	4–3	**Darvish** (8–3)	Kawagoe (1–3)	**Nakamura** (13)	Kyocera Dome	14,654	40–32–1	W1
74	June 28	@ Buffaloes	1–5	Kaneko (3–6)	**Tadano** (3–2)	—	Kyocera Dome	16,809	40–33–1	L1
75	June 29	@ Buffaloes	9–4	**Takeda** (4–0)	Kondo (5–7)	**Tateyama** (1)	Kyocera Dome	18,153	41–33–1	W1

July: 9–13–1 (Home: 7–9–0; Away: 2–4–0)

#	Date	Opponent	Score	Win	Loss	Save	Stadium	Attendance	Record	Streak
76	July 1	Lions	7–12	Onodera (3–4)	**Miyanishi** (2–3)	—	Sapporo Dome	22,125	41–34–1	L1
77	July 2	Lions	6–8	Wakui (7–6)	**Glynn** (3–11)	Graman (15)	Sapporo Dome	17,682	41–35–1	L2
78	July 3	Lions	6–4	**Darvish** (9–3)	Hoashi (7–2)	**Nakamura** (14)	Sapporo Dome	24,420	42–35–1	W1
79	July 5	Buffaloes	4–3	**Tadano** (4–2)	Ortiz (3–5)	**Nakamura** (15)	Kushiro Stadium	17,892	43–35–1	W2
80	July 6	Buffaloes	5–8	Kaneko (4–6)	**Takeda** (4–1)	Kato (17)	Obihiro Stadium	21,063	43–36–1	L1
81	July 8	@ Marines	2–5	Shimizu (7–6)	**Sweeney** (6–3)	—	Chiba Marine Stadium	18,562	43–37–1	L2
82	July 9	@ Marines	5–7	Kawasaki (1–3)	**Glynn** (3–12)	Ogino (11)	Chiba Marine Stadium	28,198	43–38–1	L3
83	July 11	Hawks	3–2	**Darvish** (10–3)	Otonari (7–7)	—	Sapporo Dome	22,712	44–38–1	W1
84	July 12	Hawks	9–6	**Tadano** (5–2)	Oba (3–5)	**Nakamura** (16)	Sapporo Dome	31,882	45–38–1	W2
85	July 13	Hawks	1–10	Wada (8–3)	**Takeda** (4–2)	—	Sapporo Dome	32,127	45–39–1	L1
86	July 15	Eagles	4–4 (12)	Game tied after 12 innings			Tokyo Dome	16,186	45–39–2	T1
87	July 16	Eagles	2–5	Katayama (2–1)	**Miyanishi** (2–4)	Kawagishi (2)	Tokyo Dome	16,249	45–40–2	L1
88	July 17	Eagles	3–1	**Darvish** (11–3)	Guzmán (2–5)	—	Tokyo Dome	20,773	46–40–2	W1
89	July 19	@ Buffaloes	2–6	Yamamoto (7–2)	**Tadano** (5–3)	—	Skymark Stadium	20,016	46–41–2	L1
90	July 20	@ Buffaloes	1–4	Kaneko (6–6)	**Takeda** (4–3)	Kato (20)	Kyocera Dome	16,068	46–42–2	L2
91	July 22	Marines	3–2	**Sweeney** (7–3)	Kobayashi (2–9)	**Nakamura** (17)	Sapporo Dome	25,845	47–42–2	W1
92	July 23	Marines	2–3	Shimizu (8–6)	**Fujii** (2–5)	Ogino (14)	Sapporo Dome	26,902	47–43–2	L1
93	July 24	Marines	2–5	Omine (1–2)	**Darvish** (11–4)	Ogino (15)	Sapporo Dome	27,825	47–44–2	L2
94	July 25	Lions	2–1	**Tadano** (6–3)	Hoashi (9–3)	**Nakamura** (18)	Sapporo Dome	23,323	48–44–2	W1
95	July 26	Lions	3–6	Iwasaki (2–0)	**Kanamori** (0–1)	Graman (20)	Sapporo Dome	33,538	48–45–2	L1
96	July 27	Lions	2–3 (10)	Graman (2–2)	**Takeda** (3–4)	—	Sapporo Dome	36,064	48–46–2	L2
97	July 28	@ Hawks	10–2	**Takeda** (5–3)	Powell (1–5)	—	Yahoo Dome	34,222	49–46–2	W1
98	July 29	@ Hawks	5–2	**Sweeney** (8–3)	Yang (1–2)	**Nakamura** (19)	Yahoo Dome	32,653	50–46–2	W2
All-Star Break: CL and PL split series, 1–1

August: 8–14–0 (Home: 2–5–0; Away: 6–9–0)

#	Date	Opponent	Score	Win	Loss	Save	Stadium	Attendance	Record	Streak
99	August 3	@ Eagles	4–11	Asai (7–7)	**Tadano** (6–4)	—	Kleenex Stadium	20,516	50–47–2	L1
100	August 4	@ Eagles	6–2	**Takeda** (6–3)	Aoyama (2–5)	—	Kleenex Stadium	18,760	51–47–2	W1
101	August 5	@ Eagles	7–2	**Sweeney** (9–3)	Guzmán (2–7)	—	Kleenex Stadium	17,942	52–47–2	W2
102	August 10	@ Lions	2–11	Hoashi (10–3)	**Tadano** (6–5)	—	Seibu Dome	30,024	52–48–2	L1
103	August 11	@ Lions	0–3	Kishi (9–4)	**Takeda** (6–4)	Graman (22)	Seibu Dome	19,260	52–49–2	L2
104	August 12	@ Lions	4–8	Onodera (4–4)	**Takeda** (3–5)	—	Seibu Dome	19,055	52–50–2	L3
105	August 13	Buffaloes	2–4	Komatsu (9–3)	**Glynn** (3–13)	Kato (24)	Sapporo Dome	24,416	52–51–2	L4
106	August 14	Buffaloes	0–2 (11)	Kato (2–3)	**Takeda** (3–6)	Shimizu (1)	Sapporo Dome	22,476	52–52–2	L5
107	August 15	Buffaloes	3–5 (10)	Kawagoe (2–3)	**Nakamura** (2–1)	Kato (25)	Sapporo Dome	22,829	52–53–2	L6
108	August 16	@ Hawks	5–1	**Yagi** (1–0)	Standridge (0–2)	—	Yahoo Dome	33,687	53–53–2	W1
109	August 17	@ Hawks	1–2	Otonari (11–8)	**Takeda** (6–5)	Mahara (5)	Yahoo Dome	33,533	53–54–2	L1
110	August 18	@ Hawks	7–0	**Sweeney** (10–3)	Hoshino (0–1)	—	Yahoo Dome	30,636	54–54–2	W1
111	August 19	Marines	4–0	**Glynn** (4–13)	Kobayashi (3–11)	—	Tokyo Dome	20,061	55–54–2	W2
112	August 20	Marines	3–6	Shimizu (9–8)	**Fujii** (2–6)	Ogino (20)	Tokyo Dome	21,034	55–55–2	L1
113	August 24	Lions	9–3	**Tadano** (7–5)	Hoashi (10–4)	—	Starffin Stadium	22,583	56–55–2	W1
114	August 25	Lions	3–4	Onodera (5–4)	**Takeda** (3–7)	Graman (23)	Sapporo Dome	21,840	56–56–2	L1
115	August 26	@ Marines	3–2	**Sweeney** (11–3)	Watanabe (11–5)	**Nakamura** (20)	Chiba Marine Stadium	20,764	57–56–2	W1
116	August 27	@ Marines	1–0	**Glynn** (5–13)	Kubo (2–6)	**Nakamura** (21)	Chiba Marine Stadium	22,038	58–56–2	W2
117	August 28	@ Marines	0–3	Shimizu (10–8)	**Fujii** (2–7)	—	Chiba Marine Stadium	16,522	58–57–2	L1
118	August 29	@ Buffaloes	4–7	Kishida (2–0)	**Kanazawa** (0–1)	Kato (29)	Skymark Stadium	20,279	58–58–2	L2
119	August 30	@ Buffaloes	2–7	Yamamoto (9–4)	**Yagi** (1–1)	—	Kyocera Dome	18,169	58–59–2	L3
120	August 31	@ Buffaloes	1–5	Kaneko (9–8)	**Tadano** (7–6)	—	Kyocera Dome	18,033	58–60–2	L4

September: 14–9–0 (Home: 9–4–0; Away: 5–5–0)

#	Date	Opponent	Score	Win	Loss	Save	Stadium	Attendance	Record	Streak
121	September 2	Hawks	2–0	**Darvish** (12–4)	Guttormson (4–5)	**Nakamura** (22)	Sapporo Dome	20,118	59–60–2	W1
122	September 3	Hawks	3–4	Sato (3–1)	**Takeda** (6–6)	Mahara (7)	Sapporo Dome	17,702	59–61–2	L1
123	September 4	Hawks	4–3	**Takeda** (4–7)	Sato (3–2)	—	Sapporo Dome	16,975	60–61–2	W1
124	September 5	Eagles	3–5 (10)	Gwyn (1–0)	**Nakamura** (2–2)	—	Sapporo Dome	22,692	60–62–2	L1
125	September 6	Eagles	4–1	**Fujii** (3–7)	Katayama (2–5)	**Nakamura** (23)	Sapporo Dome	33,197	61–62–2	W1
126	September 7	Eagles	2–5	Satake (1–0)	**Tadano** (7–7)	Arime (2)	Sapporo Dome	33,224	61–63–2	L1
127	September 9	@ Lions	4–1	**Darvish** (13–4)	Ishii (10–9)	**Nakamura** (24)	Seibu Dome	14,554	62–63–2	W1
128	September 10	@ Lions	6–5	**Sakamoto** (4–1)	Nishiguchi (8–6)	**Nakamura** (25)	Seibu Dome	14,292	63–63–2	W2
129	September 11	@ Lions	3–5	Wakui (9–9)	**Sweeney** (11–4)	Graman (27)	Seibu Dome	14,016	63–64–2	L1
130	September 13	Buffaloes	7–4	**Glynn** (6–13)	Yamamoto (9–6)	**Nakamura** (26)	Sapporo Dome	25,074	64–64–2	W1
131	September 14	Buffaloes	9–6	**Sakamoto** (5–1)	Kaneko (10–9)	**Nakamura** (27)	Sapporo Dome	30,457	65–64–2	W2
132	September 15	Buffaloes	5–4	**Darvish** (14–4)	Kato (2–4)	—	Sapporo Dome	31,473	66–64–2	W3
133	September 16	@ Eagles	1–6	Iwakuma (19–3)	**Takeda** (6–7)	—	Kleenex Stadium	11,966	66–65–2	L1
134	September 17	@ Eagles	7–15	Asai (9–10)	**Sweeney** (11–5)	—	Kleenex Stadium	12,430	66–66–2	L2
135	September 18	@ Eagles	2–5	Tanaka (8–6)	**Fujii** (3–8)	—	Kleenex Stadium	13,697	66–67–2	L3
136	September 20	@ Buffaloes	1–6	Yamamoto (10–6)	**Glynn** (6–14)	—	Kyocera Dome	20,222	66–68–2	L4
137	September 21	@ Buffaloes	10–5	**Sakamoto** (6–1)	Motoyanagi (2–7)	—	Kyocera Dome	25,036	67–68–2	W1
138	September 22	@ Hawks	9–0	**Darvish** (15–4)	Arakaki (2–6)	—	Yahoo Dome	30,491	68–68–2	W2
139	September 23	@ Hawks	5–2	**Takeda** (7–7)	Sugiuchi (10–7)	—	Yahoo Dome	30,278	69–68–2	W3
140	September 26	Lions	2–0	**Sweeney** (12–5)	Hoashi (11–6)	**Tateyama** (2)	Sapporo Dome	28,331	70–68–2	W4
141	September 27	Lions	5–4	**Glynn** (7–14)	Hsu (1–3)	**Nakamura** (28)	Sapporo Dome	35,460	71–68–2	W5
142	September 28	Marines	1–4	Naruse (8–6)	**Tateyama** (1–2)	Ogino (29)	Sapporo Dome	42,126	71–69–2	L1
143	September 29	Marines	2–1	**Darvish** (16–4)	Kobayashi (5–12)	—	Sapporo Dome	42,126	72–69–2	W1

October: 1–0–0 (Home: 0–0–0; Away: 1–0–0)

#	Date	Opponent	Score	Win	Loss	Save	Stadium	Attendance	Record	Streak
144	October 1	@ Eagles	17–0	**Takeda** (8–7)	Tanaka (9–7)	—	Kleenex Stadium	14,953	73–69–2	W2

Legend: = Win = Loss = Tie = Postponement
Bold = Fighters team member

== Postseason ==
=== Game log ===
2008 postseason game log: 4–3–0 (Home: 0–0–0; Away: 4–3–0)
Climax Series First Stage: 2–0–0 (Home: 0–0–0; Away: 2–0–0)

#	Date	Opponent	Score	Win	Loss	Save	Stadium	Attendance	Record	Streak
1	October 11	@ Buffaloes	4–1	**Darvish** (1–0)	Kondo (0–1)	—	Kyocera Dome	25,532	1–0–0	W1
2	October 12	@ Buffaloes	7–2	**Fujii** (1–0)	Komatsu (0–1)	—	Kyocera Dome	26,703	2–0–0	W2

Climax Series Second Stage: 2–3–0 (Home: 0–0–0; Away: 2–3–0)

#	Date	Opponent	Score	Win	Loss	Save	Stadium	Attendance	Record	Streak
1	October 17	@ Lions	3–10	Wakui (1–0)	**Glynn** (0–1)	—	Omiya Park Stadium	20,500	0–1–0	L1
2	October 18	@ Lions	5–0	**Darvish** (1–0)	Kishi (0–1)	—	Seibu Dome	30,918	1–1–0	W1
3	October 19	@ Lions	7–4	**Takeda** (1–0)	Hoashi (0–1)	—	Seibu Dome	33,078	2–1–0	W2
4	October 21	@ Lions	4–9	Ishii (1–0)	**Sweeney** (0–1)	—	Seibu Dome	18,704	2–2–0	L1
5	October 22	@ Lions	0–9	Wakui (2–0)	**Glynn** (0–2)	—	Seibu Dome	21,731	2–3–0	L2

Legend: = Win = Loss = Tie = Postponement
Bold = Fighters team member

== Roster ==
2008 Tohoku Rakuten Golden Eagles
Roster
Pitchers: 11 Yu Darvish; 66 Romash Tasuku Dass; 18 Shugo Fujii; 14 Ryan Glynn; 43 Yachiho Hoshino; 60 Takeshi Ito; 59 Takayuki Kanamori; 28 Takehito Kanazawa; 12 Tatsuo Kato; 47 Kazumasa Kikuchi; 17 Ken Miyamoto; 25 Naoki Miyanishi; 36 Micheal Nakamura; 30 Yataro Sakamoto; 42 Brian Sweeney; 16 Kazuhito Tadano; 21 Hisashi Takeda; 38 Masaru Takeda; 22 Yoshinori Tateyama; 67 Akiyoshi Toyoshima; 46 Yusuke Uemura; 29 Tomoya Yagi; 34 Mitsuo Yoshikawa	Catchers: 62 Ryota Imanari; 32 Satoshi Nakajima; 37 Keiji Oyama; 2 Shinji Takahashi; 64 Shinya Tsuruoka; 63 Ryuichi Watanabe; Infielders: 39 Jason Botts; 50 Suguru Ichikawa; 4 Yuji Iiyama; 45 Takahiro Imanami; 5 Naoto Inada; 15 Mitch Jones; 8 Makoto Kaneko; 31 Eiichi Koyano; 33 Hajime Miki; 9 Tomoyuki Oda; 23 Masaya Ozaki; 58 Takayuki Takaguchi; 3 Kensuke Tanaka; 24 Dai-Kang Yang	Outfielders: 41 Atsunori Inaba; 26 Yoshio Itoi; 40 Yohei Kaneko; 52 Toshimasa Konta; 53 Takahito Kudo; 1 Hichori Morimoto; 51 Kazuya Murata; 55 Yoshihiro Sato; 10 Terrmel Sledge; 7 Tomochika Tsuboi; 65 Atsushi Ugumori	Manager: 88 Masataka Nashida; Coaches: 78 Junichi Fukura (head); 74 Kazuyuki Atsuzawa (pitching); 81 Masato Yoshii (pitching); 32 Satoshi Nakajima (battery/catching); 82 Ken Hirano (hitting); 77 Terushi Nakajima (hitting); 89 Yasunaga Makishi (infield defense); 87 Masaji Shimizu (outfield defense)

== Player statistics ==
=== Batting ===
2008 Hokkaido Nippon-Ham Fighters batting statistics
Player	G	AB	R	H	2B	3B	HR	RBI	SB	BB	K	AVG	OBP	SLG	TB
Jason Botts^{†}	55	142	14	36	9	0	5	16	0	14	53	.254	.327	.423	60
Yu Darvish	25	8	0	1	1	0	0	1	0	0	3	.125	.125	.250	2
Shugo Fujii	19	4	0	2	0	0	0	1	0	0	2	.500	.500	.500	2
Ryan Glynn	26	5	0	0	0	0	0	0	0	0	1	.000	.000	.000	0
Suguru Ichikawa	3	2	0	0	0	0	0	0	0	0	2	.000	.000	.000	0
Yuji Iiyama	74	49	3	8	2	0	0	2	0	3	13	.163	.212	.204	10
Takahiro Imanami	1	1	0	0	0	0	0	0	0	0	0	.000	.000	.000	0
Ryota Imanari	9	11	1	5	1	0	0	1	1	1	1	.455	.500	.545	6
Atsunori Inaba	127	448	71	135	25	5	20	82	2	56	85	.301	.380	.513	230
Naoto Inada	99	185	10	41	1	1	0	12	3	6	13	.222	.254	.238	44
Yoshio Itoi	63	188	19	45	14	1	5	21	13	10	53	.239	.285	.404	76
Mitch Jones^{‡}	8	27	2	3	1	0	0	0	0	0	10	.111	.111	.148	4
Makoto Kaneko	96	291	24	63	16	0	2	29	0	20	76	.216	.267	.292	85
Yohei Kaneko	6	9	0	0	0	0	0	0	0	0	5	.000	.000	.000	0
Toshimasa Konta	89	140	32	33	4	1	1	6	14	9	40	.236	.287	.300	42
Eiichi Koyano	120	379	32	95	21	1	6	60	0	29	83	.251	.303	.359	136
Takahito Kudo	104	199	20	51	11	1	0	12	8	9	42	.256	.307	.322	64
Hajime Miki	17	28	5	8	2	0	0	2	0	2	7	.286	.333	.357	10
Hichori Morimoto	121	478	66	121	15	1	0	21	12	49	81	.253	.327	.289	138
Kazuya Murata	15	34	5	8	0	0	0	1	0	2	12	.235	.297	.235	8
Satoshi Nakajima	22	4	1	3	0	0	0	1	0	0	0	.750	.750	.750	3
Tomoyuki Oda	64	141	13	41	5	0	3	16	0	11	33	.291	.342	.390	55
Keiji Oyama	27	29	3	5	1	0	0	0	0	1	3	.172	.200	.207	6
Masaya Ozaki	8	15	0	2	0	0	0	0	0	0	3	.133	.133	.133	2
Yoshihiro Sato	7	12	1	1	0	0	1	2	0	1	4	.083	.154	.333	4
Terrmel Sledge	113	395	41	114	21	2	16	69	0	44	88	.289	.361	.473	187
Brian Sweeney	29	4	0	1	0	0	0	1	0	0	2	.250	.250	.250	1
Kazuhito Tadano	20	5	0	1	0	0	0	0	0	0	1	.200	.200	.200	1
Takayuki Takaguchi	74	167	12	36	5	4	0	14	1	7	49	.216	.272	.293	49
Shinji Takahashi	108	357	33	102	19	0	9	58	3	24	74	.286	.333	.415	148
Kensuke Tanaka	144	536	89	159	32	9	11	63	21	62	80	.297	.379	.451	242
Tomochika Tsuboi	26	50	2	11	2	0	0	1	0	1	7	.220	.250	.260	13
Shinya Tsuruoka	97	248	24	52	14	0	1	18	0	12	49	.210	.247	.278	69
Atsushi Ugumori	11	20	3	6	1	0	0	2	0	1	3	.300	.364	.350	7
Ryuichi Watanabe	4	4	0	1	1	0	0	0	0	0	1	.250	.250	.500	2
Dai-Kang Yang	44	111	7	16	0	1	2	4	1	6	31	.144	.193	.216	24
Total：36 players	1,875	4,726	533	1,206	224	27	82	516	79	380	1,010	.255	.316	.366	1,730

^{†}Denotes player joined the team mid-season. Stats reflect time with the Fighters only.
^{‡}Denotes player left the team mid-season. Stats reflect time with the Fighters only.
Bold/italics denotes best in the league

=== Pitching ===
2008 Hokkaido Nippon-Ham Fighters pitching statistics
Player	W	L	ERA	G	GS	SV	IP	H	R	ER	BB	K
Yu Darvish	16	4	1.88	25	24	0	200.2	136	44	42	44	208
Romash Tasuku Dass	0	0	0.00	1	1	0	5	4	1	0	3	2
Shugo Fujii	3	8	3.25	19	19	0	110.2	115	46	40	41	76
Ryan Glynn	7	14	3.64	26	25	0	163.1	160	74	66	61	99
Yachiho Hoshino	2	1	4.94	23	0	0	23.2	31	17	13	6	11
Takeshi Ito	0	0	5.40	4	0	0	3.1	7	3	2	0	2
Takayuki Kanamori	0	1	4.50	10	0	0	12	14	7	6	5	7
Takehito Kanazawa	0	1	6.00	4	3	0	18	23	12	12	7	8
Tatsuo Kato	0	0	8.44	14	0	0	10.2	16	11	10	4	7
Kazumasa Kikuchi	0	0	9.90	11	0	0	10	17	11	11	3	4
Ken Miyamoto	0	0	5.40	9	0	0	8.1	11	9	5	4	6
Naoki Miyanishi	2	4	4.37	50	0	0	45.1	47	24	22	15	25
Micheal Nakamura	2	2	2.14	46	0	28	46.1	32	11	11	12	47
Yataro Sakamoto	6	1	3.18	31	0	0	51	41	18	18	18	35
Brian Sweeney	12	5	3.48	28	25	0	163	139	65	63	72	90
Kazuhito Tadano	7	7	4.78	19	19	0	105.1	107	57	56	22	61
Hisashi Takeda	4	7	4.40	62	0	6	61.1	68	31	30	19	40
Masaru Takeda	8	7	2.96	20	19	0	121.2	110	44	40	19	68
Yoshinori Tateyama	1	2	3.07	58	0	2	67.1	61	23	23	12	53
Akiyoshi Toyoshima	0	0	0.00	2	0	0	2	1	0	0	1	0
Yusuke Uemura	0	0	3.00	2	0	0	3	3	1	1	3	0
Tomoya Yagi	1	1	6.75	2	2	0	10.2	14	8	8	2	10
Mitsuo Yoshikawa	2	4	6.23	7	7	0	34.2	39	24	24	22	23
Total：23 players	73	69	3.54	473	144	36	1,277.1	1,196	541	503	395	882

^{†}Denotes player spent time with another team before joining the Eagles. Stats reflect time with the Eagles only.
^{‡}Denotes player was traded mid-season. Stats reflect time with the Eagles only.
Bold/italics denotes best in the league

== Awards ==
Nippon Life Monthly MVP Award

- Yu Darvish - March/April, September (pitcher)

Best Nine Award

- Atsunori Inaba - outfielder

Mitsui Golden Glove Award

- Yu Darvish - pitcher
- Kensuke Tanaka - second baseman
- Atsunori Inaba - outfielder
- Hichori Morimoto - outfielder

All-Star Series selections

- Masataka Nashida - manager
- Yu Darvish - starting pitcher
- Hisashi Takeda - relief pitcher
- Kensuke Tanaka - second baseman
- Atsunori Inaba - outfielder
- Hichori Morimoto - outfielder

== Farm team ==
Eastern League regular season standings
Team	G	W	L	T	Win%	GB	Home	Away
Tokyo Yakult Swallows	96	55	34	7	.618	—	35–10–3	20–24–4
Yomiuri Giants	96	58	36	2	.617	—	29–15–1	29–21–1
Shonan Searex	96	50	43	3	.538	7	23–24–1	27–19–2
Tohoku Rakuten Golden Eagles	96	46	45	5	.505	10	24–21–3	22–24–2
Saitama Seibu Lions	96	42	51	3	.452	15	23–25–2	19–26–1
Chiba Lotte Marines	96	37	53	6	.411	18½	21–24–3	16–29–3
Hokkaido Nippon-Ham Fighters	96	33	61	2	.351	24½	22–26–1	11–35–1

== Nippon Professional Baseball draft ==
2008 Hokkaido Nippon-Ham Fighters Draft selections
Round	Name	Position	Affiliation	Signed?
1	Shota Ono	Catcher	Toyo University	yes
2	Ryo Sakakibara	Pitcher	Kansai University of International Studies	yes
3	Toshiyuki Yanuki	Pitcher	Mitsubishi Fuso Kawasaki	yes
4	Kenji Tsuchiya	Pitcher	Yokohama High School	yes
5	Takuya Nakashima	Infielder	Fukuoka Technical High School	yes
6	Kenshi Sugiya	Infielder	Iizuka High School	yes
7	Keisuke Tanimoto	Pitcher	VITAL-NET	yes
