= Kazuya Murata =

Kazuya Murata may refer to:

- Kazuya Murata (footballer)
- Kazuya Murata (director)
- Kazuya Murata (baseball)
