= Hōtoku Gakuen High School =

Coordinates: 34.7695°N 135.3718°E

- 報徳学園高等学校
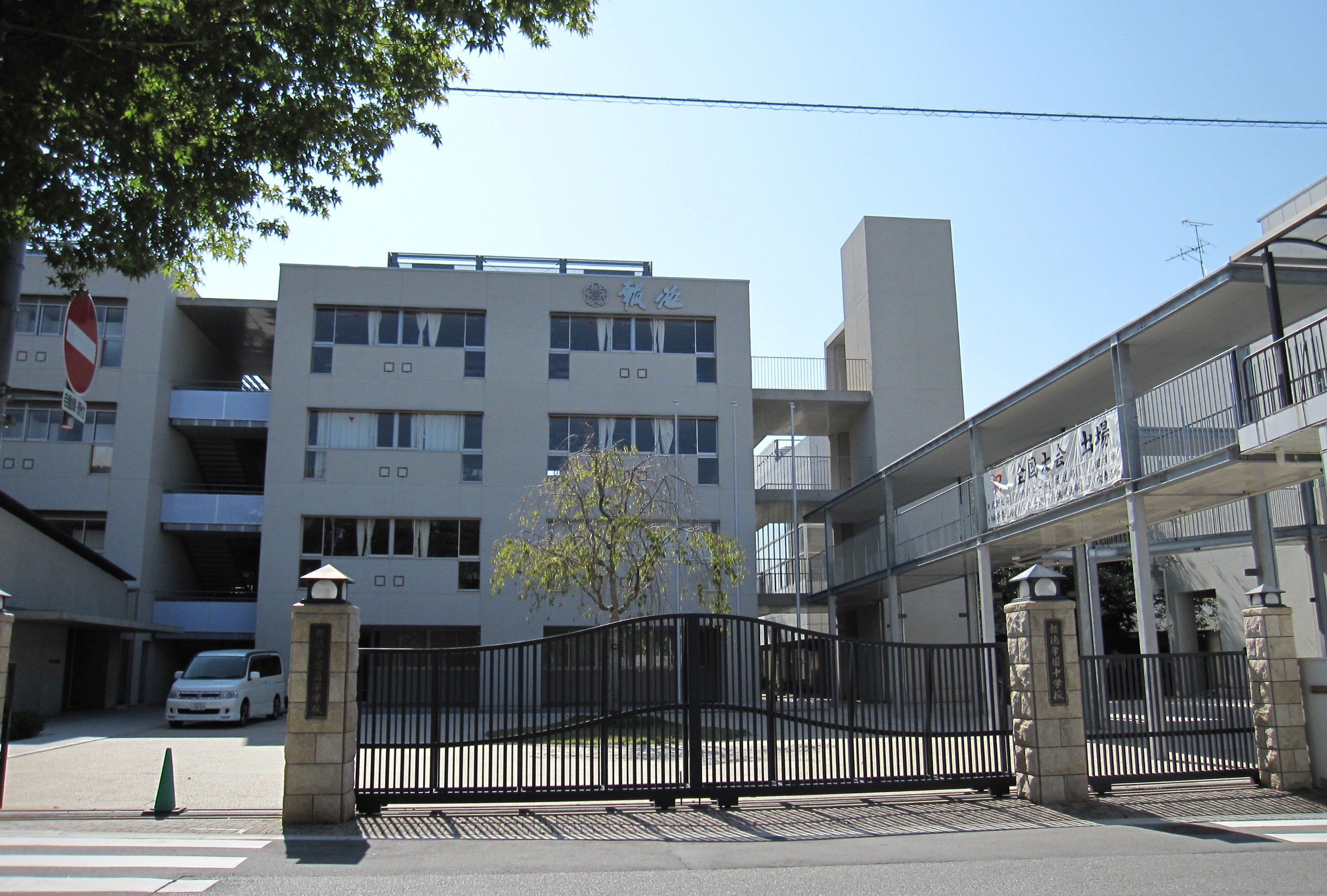
- Nishinomiya, Hyōgo Prefecture; Japan

Information
- Type: Comprehensive high school
- Motto: 以徳報徳 (To requite virtue with the virtue)
- Established: 1911
- Gender: Boys
- Campus type: Suburban
- Last updated: July 2017

Hōtoku Gakuen High School (報徳学園) is a high school in Nishinomiya, Hyogo Prefecture, Japan. The school has a sports program which has produced a number of professional baseball players. It was founded as the Hōtoku Business School in Mikage, Kobe, in 1911. The school was strongly affected by the 1995 Kobe earthquake.

== Notable alumni ==
=== Baseball players ===
- Hiroshi Katayama
- Kaito Kozono
- Ryusuke Minami, NPB outfielder
- Makoto Moriyama
- Tomohisa Otani
- Masaya Ozaki
- Naoki Satoh
- Naoyuki Shimizu, NPB pitcher
- Katsuki Yamazaki

=== Rugby players ===
- Mitsutake Hagimoto
- Atsushi Hiwasa
- Yusuke Niwai

=== Footballers ===
- Hidetaka Ubagai
- Takuto Yasuoka

=== Athletics ===
- Koji Ito, track and field sprinter
- Kensuke Takezawa, long-distance runner

=== Sumo wrestlers ===
- Tochinowaka Michihiro
- Takakeishō Mitsunobu

=== Other ===
- Daisuke Hosokawa, swimmer
- Mirai Moriyama, actor
- Yuichiro Nagashima, martial artist
- Tsukasa Nakano, basketball player
- Atom Shukugawa, comedian
