= Takehito =

- Gender: Male

Origin
- Origin: Japanese
- Meaning: Different meanings depending on the kanji used

Takehito (written: 武人, 威仁, 健人, 健仁, 岳人 or たけひと in hiragana) is a masculine Japanese given name. Notable people with the name include:

- Prince Arisugawa Takehito (有栖川宮威仁親王) (1862–1913), Japanese prince and Imperial Japanese Navy admiral
- Takehito Kanazawa (金澤 健人) (born 1979), Japanese baseball player
- Takehito Koyasu (子安 武人) (born 1967), Japanese voice actor
- Takehito Shigehara (茂原 岳人) (born 1981), Japanese footballer
- Takehito Suzuki (鈴木 健仁) (born 1971), Japanese footballer
