= Shinya Tsuruoka =

Japanese baseball player (born 1981)

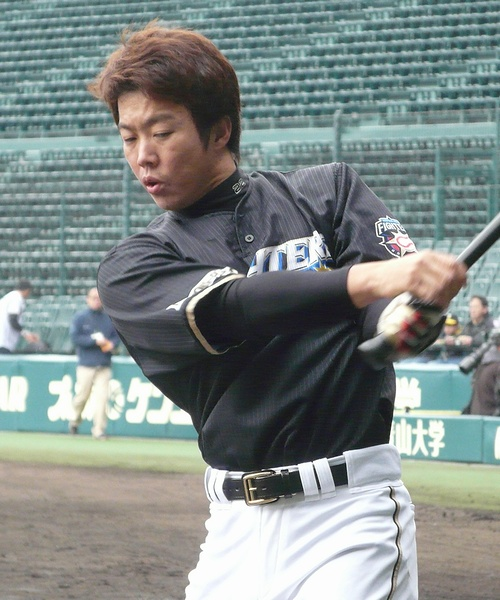
- Tsuruoka with the Hokkaido Nippon-Ham Fighters
- Catcher / Coach
- Born: April 11, 1981 (age 45)
- Batted: Right Threw: Right

NPB debut
- September 7, 2005, for the Hokkaido Nippon-Ham Fighters

Last NPB appearance
- October 29, 2021, for the Hokkaido Nippon-Ham Fighters

NPB statistics (through 2021 season)
- Batting average: .238
- Hits: 646
- Home runs: 20
- RBIs: 267
- Stolen Bases: 12
- Stats at Baseball Reference

Teams
- As player: Nippon-Ham Fighters/Hokkaido Nippon-Ham Fighters (2003–2013); Fukuoka SoftBank Hawks (2014–2017); Hokkaido Nippon-Ham Fighters (2018–2021); As coach: Hokkaido Nippon-Ham Fighters (2019–2021)

Career highlights and awards
- 2012 Pacific League Best Nine Award; 2009 Pacific League Golden Glove Award; 4× Japan Series champion (2006, 2014, 2015, 2017); 2× NPB All-Star selection (2012-2013)

Shinya Tsuruoka (鶴岡 慎也, born April 11, 1981, in Kagoshima, Japan) is a Japanese professional baseball catcher for the Hokkaido Nippon-Ham Fighters in Japan's Nippon Professional Baseball.
