= Naoto Inada =

Japanese baseball player (born 1979)

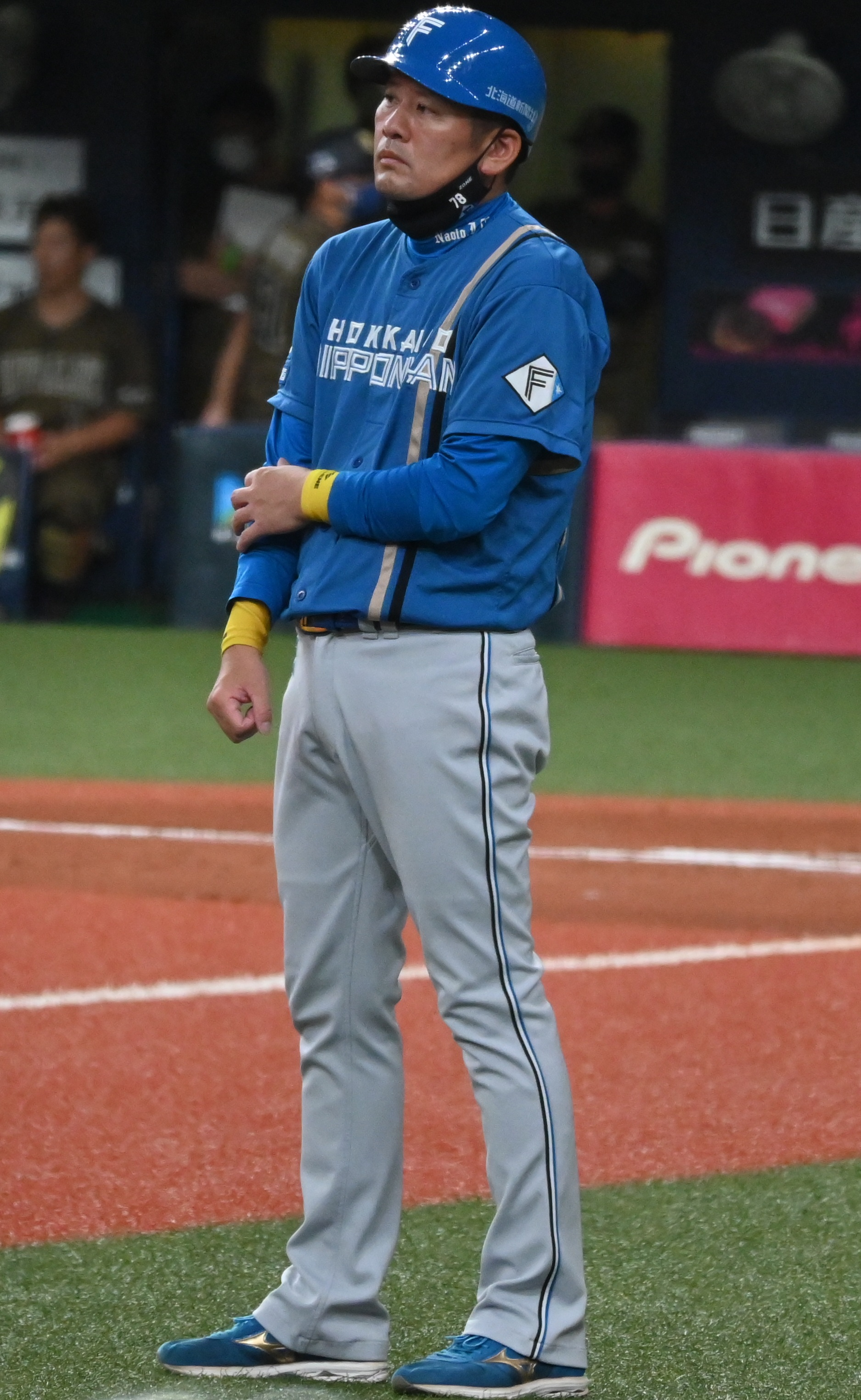
- Infielder / Coach
- Born: November 6, 1979 (age 46); Hatsukaichi, Hiroshima, Japan
- Batted: Left Threw: Right

NPB debut
- June 18, 2006, for the Hokkaido Nippon-Ham Fighters

Last appearance
- August 12, 2012, for the Tohoku Rakuten Golden Eagles

NPB statistics
- Batting average: .254
- Hits: 137
- Home runs: 0
- Runs batted in: 39
- Stolen base: 4

Teams
- As player: Hokkaido Nippon-Ham Fighters (2004–2009); Yokohama BayStars (2010–2011); Tohoku Rakuten Golden Eagles (2012); As coach: Hokkaido Nippon-Ham Fighters (2022–2023); Fubon Guardians (2024)

Career highlights and awards
- 1× Japan Series champion (2006)

Naoto Inada (稲田 直人, Inada Naoto; born November 6, 1979 in Hatsukaichi, Hiroshima) is a retired Japanese professional infielder.
