= Makoto Kaneko (baseball) =

Japanese baseball player (born 1975)

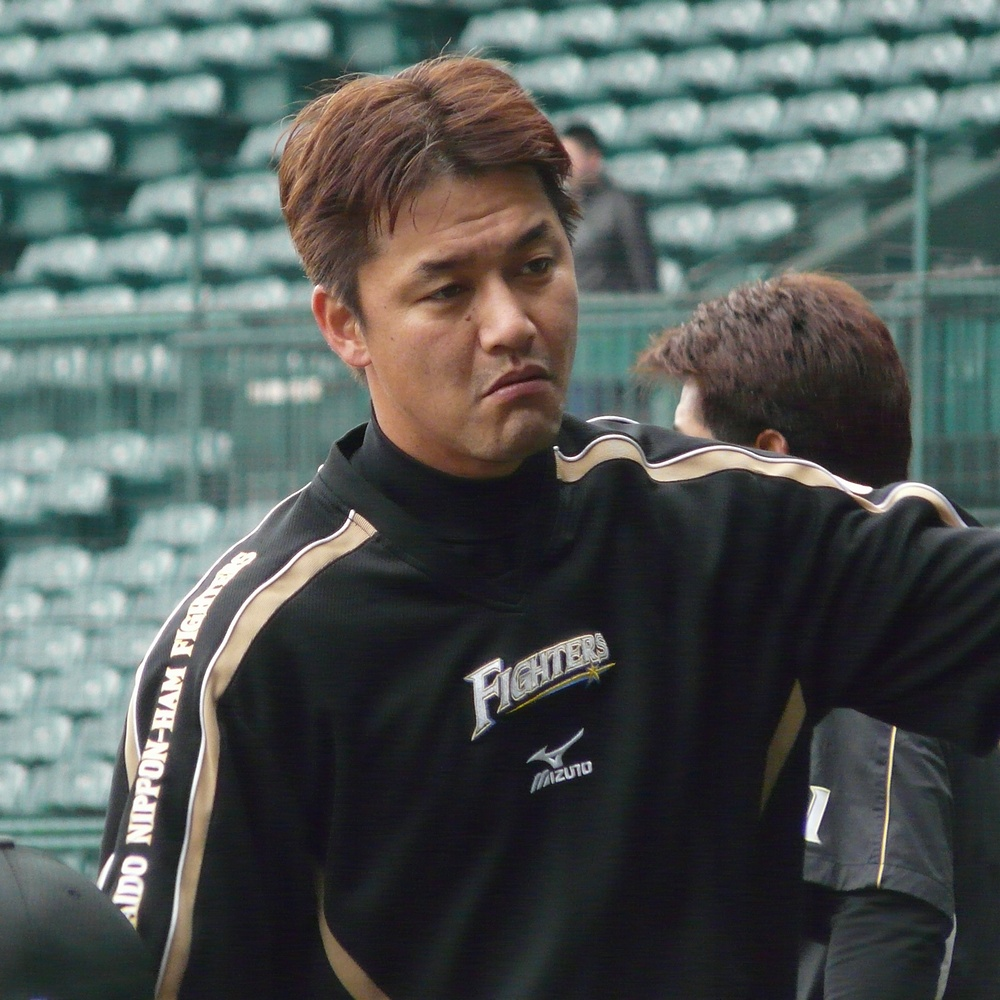
- Infielder, Shortstop, Coach
- Born: November 8, 1975 (age 50); Chiba Prefecture, Japan
- Batted: Right Threw: Right

debut
- April 2, 1995, for the Nippon-Ham Fighters

Last appearance
- October 1, 2014, for the Hokkaido Nippon-Ham Fighters

Career statistics
- Batting average: .259
- Home runs: 84
- Hits: 1,551
- Stats at Baseball Reference

Teams
- As player: Nippon Ham Fighters/Hokkaido Nippon Ham Fighters (1994–2014); As coach: Hokkaido Nippon-Ham Fighters (2015–2022); Chiba Lotte Marines (2023-2025)

Career highlights and awards
- Pacific League Rookie of the Year Award (1996); 1× Best Nine Award (1999); 3× Mitsui Golden Glove Award (1998, 1999, 2009); 1× Japan Series champion (2006)
Medals
Men's baseball
Representing Japan
Summer Olympics
Bronze medal – third place	Athens 2004	Team competition

Makoto Kaneko (金子 誠, born November 8, 1975) is a Japanese professional baseball player and manager. He is an infielder for the Hokkaido Nippon-Ham Fighters.

Kaneko won the Pacific League rookie of the year award in 1996. He won two golden glove awards at second base before being converted to shortstop.

He joined the Japanese olympic baseball team for the 2004 Summer Olympics, and won a bronze medal.
