= Masaji Shimizu =

Japanese baseball player (born 1964)

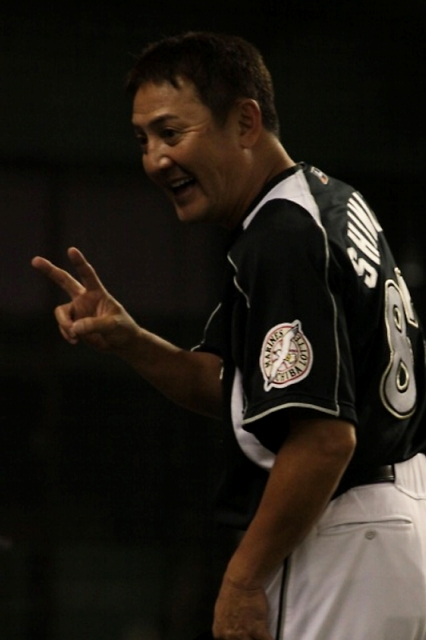

Hokkaido Nippon-Ham Fighters – No. 78
- Outfielder / Coach
- Born: July 7, 1964 (age 61); Hamada, Shimane
- Batted: Right Threw: Right

NPB debut
- April 23, 1989, for the Chunichi Dragons

Last appearance
- October 5, 2002, for the Seibu Lions

NPB statistics (through 2002 season)
- Batting average: .244
- Hits: 362
- RBIs: 111
- Stats at Baseball Reference

Teams
- As player: Chunichi Dragons (1989 – 1995); Seibu Lions (1996 – 2002); As coach: Seibu Lions (2002 – 2007); Hokkaido Nippon-Ham Fighters (2008 – 2012, 2024 - ); Chiba Lotte Marines (2013 – 2017); Tohoku Rakuten Golden Eagles (2018); Hanshin Tigers (2019 – 2021)

Masaji Shimizu (清水 雅治, Shimizu Masaji; born July 7, 1964 in Hamada, Shimane, Japan) is a former Japanese professional baseball player.
