= Kyohei Muranaka =

Japanese baseball player

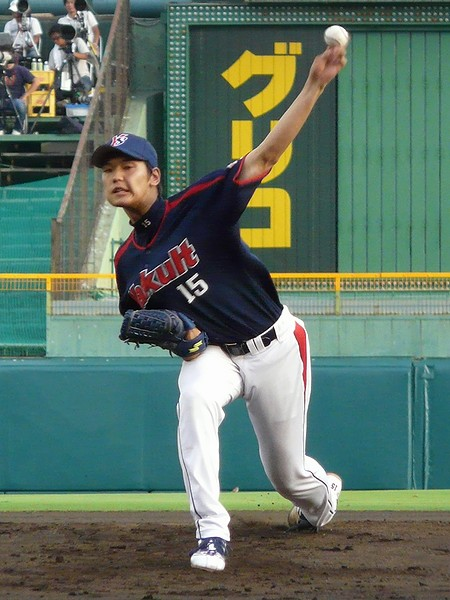

Tokyo Yakult Swallows – No. 76
- Pitcher / Coach
- Born: October 25, 1987 (age 38); Aikō District, Kanagawa, Japan
- Batted: Left Threw: Left

debut
- October 14, 2006, for the Tokyo Yakult Swallows

Last appearance
- June 15, 2018, for the Tokyo Yakult Swallows

NPB statistics
- Win–loss record: 46–55
- Earned run average: 4.30
- Strikeouts: 600
- Stats at Baseball Reference

Teams
- As player: Tokyo Yakult Swallows (2006–2018); As coach: Tokyo Yakult Swallows (2026-present)

Kyohei Muranaka (村中 恭兵, Muranaka Kyōhei; born October 25, 1987) is a Japanese professional baseball pitcher for the Auckland Tuatara of the Australian Baseball League (ABL). He previously played for the Tokyo Yakult Swallows of the Nippon Professional Baseball(NPB).

== Career ==
Tokyo Yakult Swallows selected him with the 1st selection in the 2005 NPB draft.

On December 2, 2019, he become free agent. On December 4, 2019, Muranaka joined for the Auckland Tuatara for the Australian Baseball League (ABL). In nine regular season appearances for the Tuatara, he started five games, going 2-2 with a 2.73 ERA over 29 2/3 innings.
