= Shota Oba =

Japanese baseball player (born 1985)

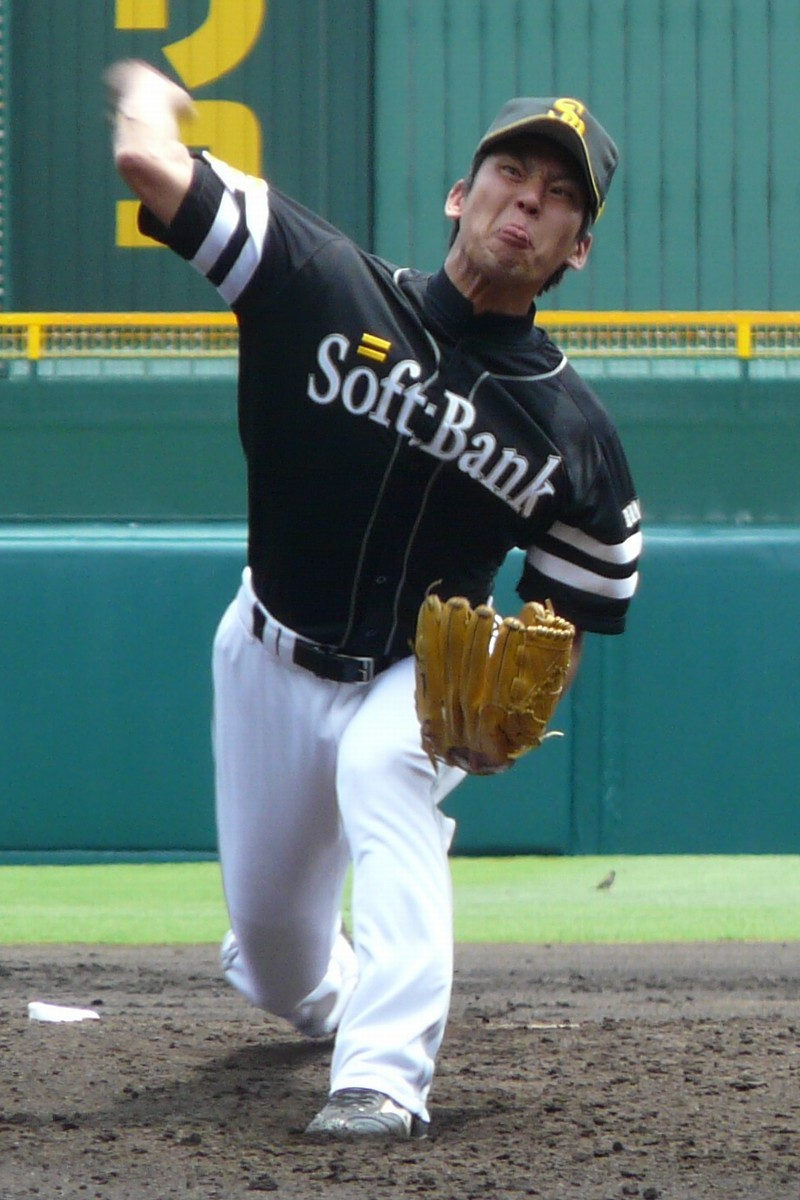
- Oba with the Fukuoka SoftBank Hawks
- Pitcher
- Born: June 27, 1985 (age 40); Adachi, Tokyo, Japan
- Batted: Right Threw: Right

NPB debut
- March 23, 2008, for the Fukuoka SoftBank Hawks

Last NPB appearance
- May 29, 2014, for the Fukuoka SoftBank Hawks

NPB statistics
- Win–loss record: 15–21
- Earned run average: 4.39
- Strikeouts: 286
- Stats at Baseball Reference

Teams
- Fukuoka SoftBank Hawks (2008–2014)

Shota Oba (大場 翔太, Ōba Shōta; born June 27, 1985) is a Japanese former professional baseball pitcher. He played in Nippon Professional Baseball (NPB) for the Fukuoka SoftBank Hawks from 2008 to 2014.

== Career ==
In 2008, Oba set a Fukuoka SoftBank Hawks club record with 16 strikeouts in a game. The record was later surpassed in 2025 by Liván Moinelo, who recorded 18 strikeouts.

On 1 October 2016, Oba was released by the Chunichi Dragons only one year after signing via a cash deal with the Hawks.
