= Tomochika Tsuboi =

Japanese baseball player

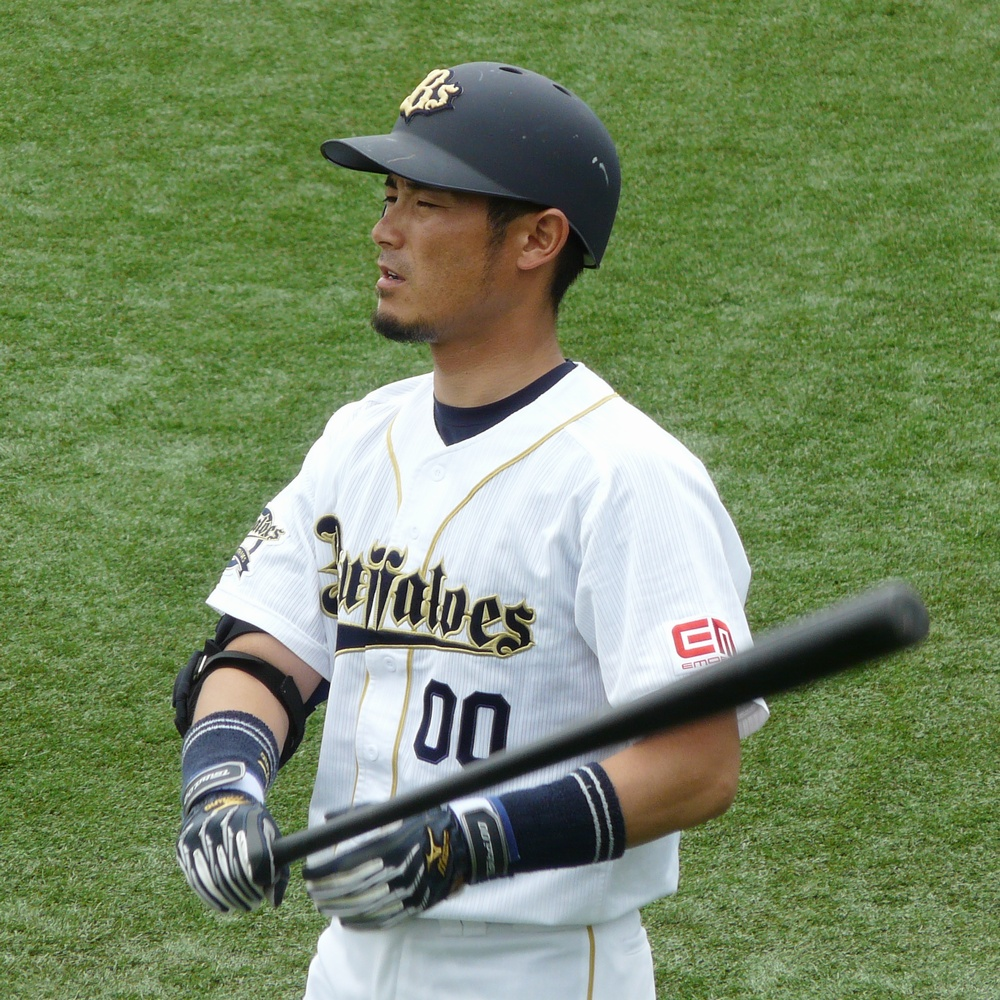

Tokyo Yakult Swallows – No. 87
- Outfielder / Coach
- Born: February 19, 1974 (age 52); Tokyo
- Batted: Left Threw: Left

NPB debut
- April 3, 1998, for the Hanshin Tigers

Last NPB appearance
- June 30, 2011, for the Orix Buffaloes

NPB statistics
- At bats: 3348
- Hits: 976
- RBIs: 265
- Stats at Baseball Reference

Teams
- As player: Hanshin Tigers (1998–2002); Nippon-Ham Fighters Hokkaido Nippon-Ham Fighters (2003–2010); Orix Buffaloes (2011); As coach: Yokohama DeNA BayStars (2015–2021); Tokyo Yakult Swallows (2025–)
- Last updated on: 21 December 2024

Tomochika Tsuboi (Japanese: 坪井 智哉, born February 19, 1974, in Kōtō, Tokyo, Japan) is a Japanese baseball outfielder. He previously played in the NPB for 13 seasons, starting in 1998. His professional career started with the Hanshin Tigers, but he was traded to the Nippon-Ham Fighters for Toshihiro Noguchi after the 2002 season. His stint with Nippon Ham was his longest with the same team, lasting through 2010. He then played briefly for the Orix Buffaloes, his final season in Japanese pro ball. He declined a coaching position with the Fighters and since 2012 has played in various American independent leagues.

== NPB statistics ==
SEASON	TEAM	G	AB	R	H	2B	3B	HR	RBI	BB	SO	SB	CS	AVG
1998	T	123	413	63	135	26	2	2	21	38	80	7	5	.327
1999	T	134	530	75	161	30	1	5	43	50	90	6	10	.304
2000	T	128	489	49	133	14	4	4	32	50	83	6	6	.272
2001	T	43	128	12	28	7	2	2	11	11	30	1	1	.219
2002	T	24	68	8	17	3	0	1	6	5	19	1	0	.250
2003	F	123	443	70	146	26	3	5	40	52	79	13	5	.330
2004	F	89	359	53	102	23	2	11	43	43	64	4	6	.284
2005	F	98	314	39	97	10	1	2	19	31	54	5	3	.309
2006	F	25	47	4	9	2	0	0	1	2	10	0	0	.191
2007	F	100	276	26	78	7	2	0	23	17	53	6	2	.283
2008	F	26	50	2	11	2	0	0	1	1	7	0	0	.220
2009	F	84	146	13	39	8	0	0	15	5	23	0	0	.267
2010	F	36	77	7	18	3	1	0	9	4	19	1	0	.234
2011	Bs	3	8	0	2	1	0	0	1	0	2	0	0	.250
Total	---	1036	3348	421	976	162	18	32	265	263	613	50	38	.292
