= Hidetaka Kawagoe =

Japanese baseball player & coach (born 1973)

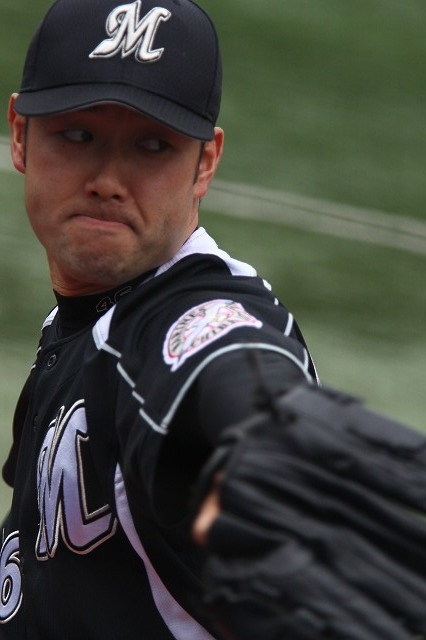
- Kawagoe with the Chiba Lotte Marines.

Fukuoka SoftBank Hawks – No. 012
- Pitcher / Coach
- Born: June 8, 1973 (age 52); Sagamihara, Kanagawa, Japan
- Batted: Right Threw: Right

NPB debut
- April 6, 1999, for the Orix BlueWave

Last NPB appearance
- August 23, 2011, for the Chiba Lotte Marines

NPB statistics
- Win–loss record: 54-76
- Earned run average: 4.10
- Strikeouts: 767

Teams
- As player: Orix BlueWave/Orix Buffaloes (1999–2009); Chiba Lotte Marines (2010–2011); As coach: Chiba Lotte Marines (2012–2022); Fukuoka SoftBank Hawks (2024–present)

Career highlights and awards
- As player: Pacific League Outstanding Rookie of the Year Award (1999); Japan Series champion (2010); NPB All-Star (1999); As coach: Japan Series champion (2025)
- Last updated on: 23 November 2022

Hidetaka Kawagoe (川越 英隆, born April 8, 1973), nicknamed "Goe", is a Japanese former professional baseball pitcher, and current the fourth squad pitching coach for the Fukuoka SoftBank Hawks of Nippon Professional Baseball (NPB).

He played in NPB for the Orix BlueWave / Orix Buffaloes, and the Chiba Lotte Marines.

== Early baseball career ==
Kawagoe went on to Gakuho Ishikawa High School and participated the 63rd Japanese High School Baseball Invitational Tournament, and the 73rd Japanese High School Baseball Championship in his junior year.

He entered Aoyama Gakuin University, but while the team won the Tohto University Baseball League for three years in a row, he was unable to show his performance and pitched in 20 games with a record of 3-2 Win–loss record.

After that, he joined Nissan, and won the Intercity baseball tournament in his third year, winning the Most valuable player.

== Professional career ==
=== Active player era ===
==== Orix BlueWave / Orix Buffaloes ====
On November 20, 1998, Kawagoe was drafted second round pick by the Orix BlueWave in the 1998 Nippon Professional Baseball draft.

His rookie season in 1999, Kawagoe pitched in 26 games, posting a 11-8 win–loss record with a 2.85 ERA. He gave up the Rookie of the Year Award to Daisuke Matsuzaka, who won 16 games, but won the Pacific League Outstanding Rookie of the Year Award.

He pitched for Orix for 11 seasons, primarily as a starting pitcher, pitched in 265 games and posting a 51-74 win–loss record, and a 14 holds.

On October 3, 2009, the Buffaloes announced that they had released Kawagoe.

==== Chiba Lotte Marines ====
On November 25, 2009, Kawagoe signed with Chiba Lotte Marines.

In the 2010 season, he pitched in 15 games and started 4 games, finishing with a recorded 3-2 win–loss record, and an ERA of 7.36.

He played two seasons with the Marines before retiring after the 2011 season.

Kawagoe pitched in 298 games in 13 seasons overall, compiling with a 54-76 win–loss record, a 16 holds, and a 4.10 ERA.

=== After retirement ===
After his retirement, Kawagoe was appointed as the second squad pitching coach of the Chiba Lotte Marines since 2012 season.

He served as the pitching coach for the first and second squad until the 2022 season, but his departure was announced on October 6, 2022.

On November 10, 2023, Kawagoe was appointed as the fourth squad pitching coach of the Fukuoka SoftBank Hawks.
