= Atsushi Ugumori =

Japanese baseball player

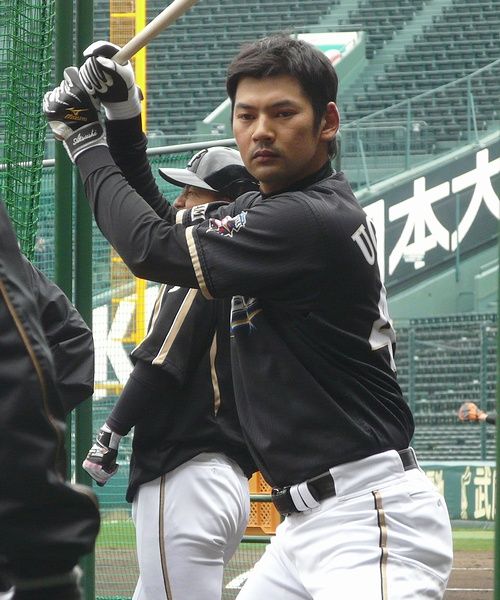
- Ugumori with the Hokkaido Nippon-Ham Fighters
- Outfielder
- Born: February 1, 1987 (age 39); Ehime, Japan
- Bats: Right Throws: Right

debut
- 2006, for the Hokkaido Nippon-Ham Fighters

Career statistics (through 2016 season)
- Batting average: .233
- Hits: 88
- Home runs: 10
- Stats at Baseball Reference

Teams
- Hokkaido Nippon-Ham Fighters (2005–2015); Tokyo Yakult Swallows (2016–2018)

Atsushi Ugumori (鵜久森 淳志, Ugumori Atsushi) is a Japanese professional baseball player. He was born on February 1, 1987. He debuted in 2006. He had 2 runs in 2013.
