= Keiji Oyama =

Japanese baseball player (born 1980)

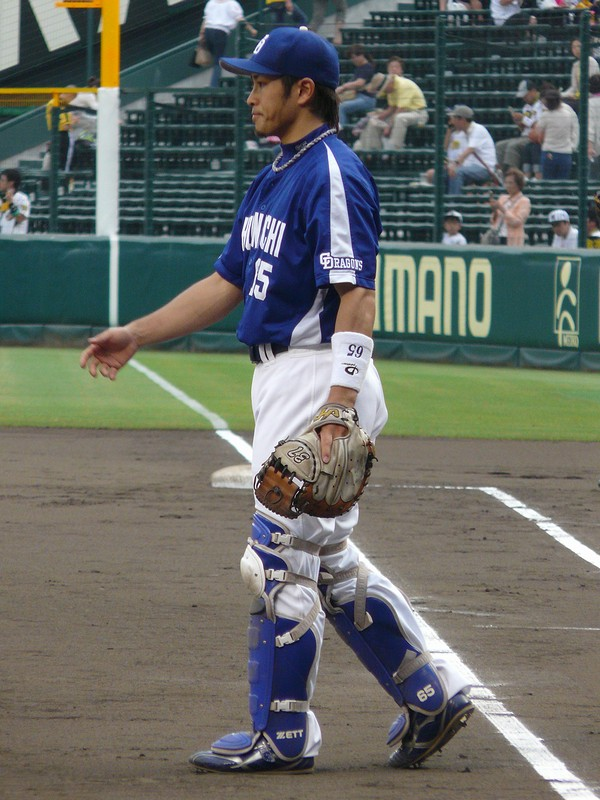
- Oyama with the Chunichi Dragons
- Catcher
- Born: November 19, 1980 (age 45)
- Bats: Right Throws: Right

NPB debut
- 2008, for the Hokkaido Nippon-Ham Fighters

NPB statistics (through 2015)
- Batting average: .204
- Home runs: 2
- RBI: 30
- Stats at Baseball Reference

Teams
- Hokkaido Nippon-Ham Fighters (2008); Chunichi Dragons (2009–2011); Tohoku Rakuten Golden Eagles (2012–2015)

Career highlights and awards
- Japan Series champion (2013)

Keiji Oyama (小山 桂司; born November 19, 1980) is a Japanese former professional baseball catcher in Japan's Nippon Professional Baseball. He played for the Hokkaido Nippon-Ham Fighters in 2008, the Chunichi Dragons from 2009 to 2011, and for the Tohoku Rakuten Golden Eagles from 2012 to 2015.
