= Romash Tasuku Dass =

Japanese baseball player

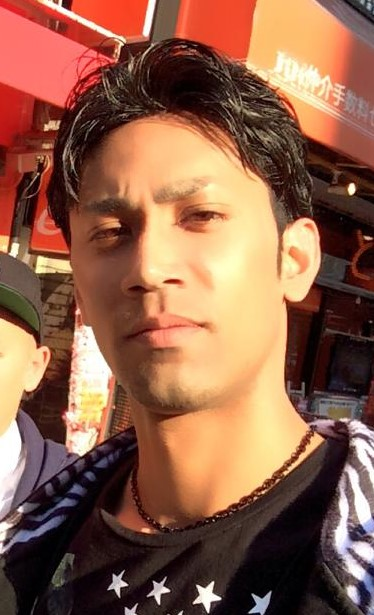
- Dass in 2019
- Pitcher
- Born: December 15, 1988 (age 37); Ikoma, Nara, Japan
- Batted: Right Threw: Right

NPB debut
- May 6, 2008, for the Hokkaido Nippon-Ham Fighters

Last NPB appearance
- April 16, 2010, for the Hokkaido Nippon-Ham Fighters

NPB statistics
- Games started: 2
- Innings pitched: 7.1
- Earned run average: 3.68
- Stats at Baseball Reference

Teams
- Hokkaido Nippon-Ham Fighters (2008, 2010)

Romash Tasuki Dass (born December 15, 1988) is a former baseball player from Japan.

== Career and family ==
Dass played for the Hokkaido Nippon-Ham Fighters in the Pacific League. Dass' career was hampered by injuries and the Fighters did not offer him a contract after the 2010 season.

Dass has been called "Darvish II" in Japanese press because he and Yu Darvish are both tall, biracial Japanese pitchers. Dass was born to an Indian father and Japanese mother.
