= Shogo Yamamoto =

Japanese baseball player

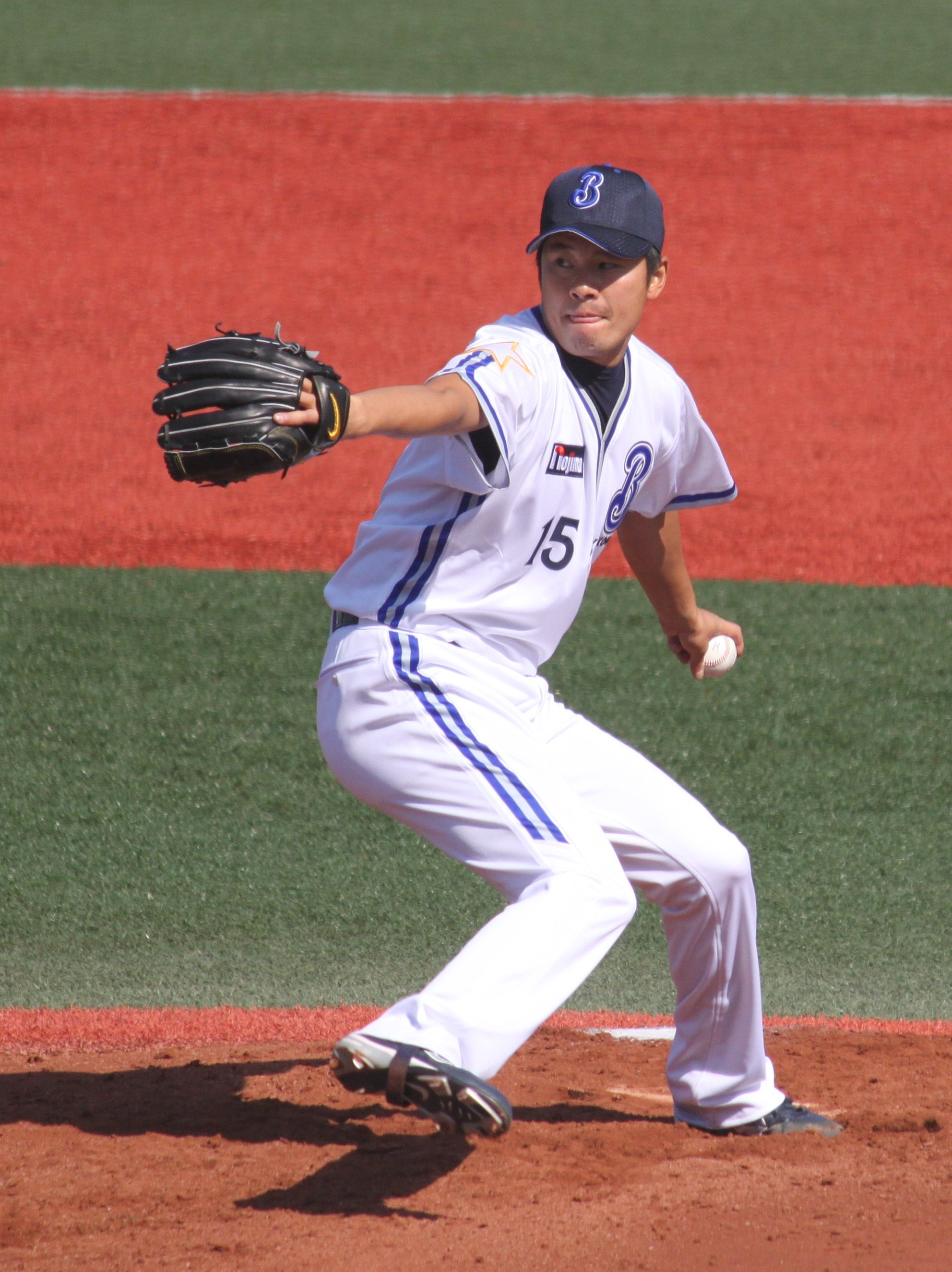
- Pitcher
- Born: May 28, 1978 (age 47); Ishikawa, Japan
- Batted: Left Threw: Left

NPB debut
- May 28, 2001, for the Osaka Kintetsu Buffaloes

Last NPB appearance
- April 3, 2013, for the Fukuoka SoftBank Hawks

NPB statistics (through 2013 season)
- Win–loss record: 40–42
- ERA: 4.41
- Strikeouts: 501
- Saves: 2
- Holds: 11

Teams
- Osaka Kintetsu Buffaloes (2001–2004); Orix Buffaloes (2005–2010); Yokohama BayStars/Yokohama DeNA BayStars (2011–2012); Fukuoka SoftBank Hawks (2013)

Career highlights and awards
- 1× NPB All-Star (2008)

Shogo Yamamoto (山本 省吾, Yamamoto Shōgo; born May 28, 1978 in Ishikawa, Japan) is a Japanese former Nippon Professional Baseball pitcher.
