= Takahiro Imanami =

Japanese baseball player

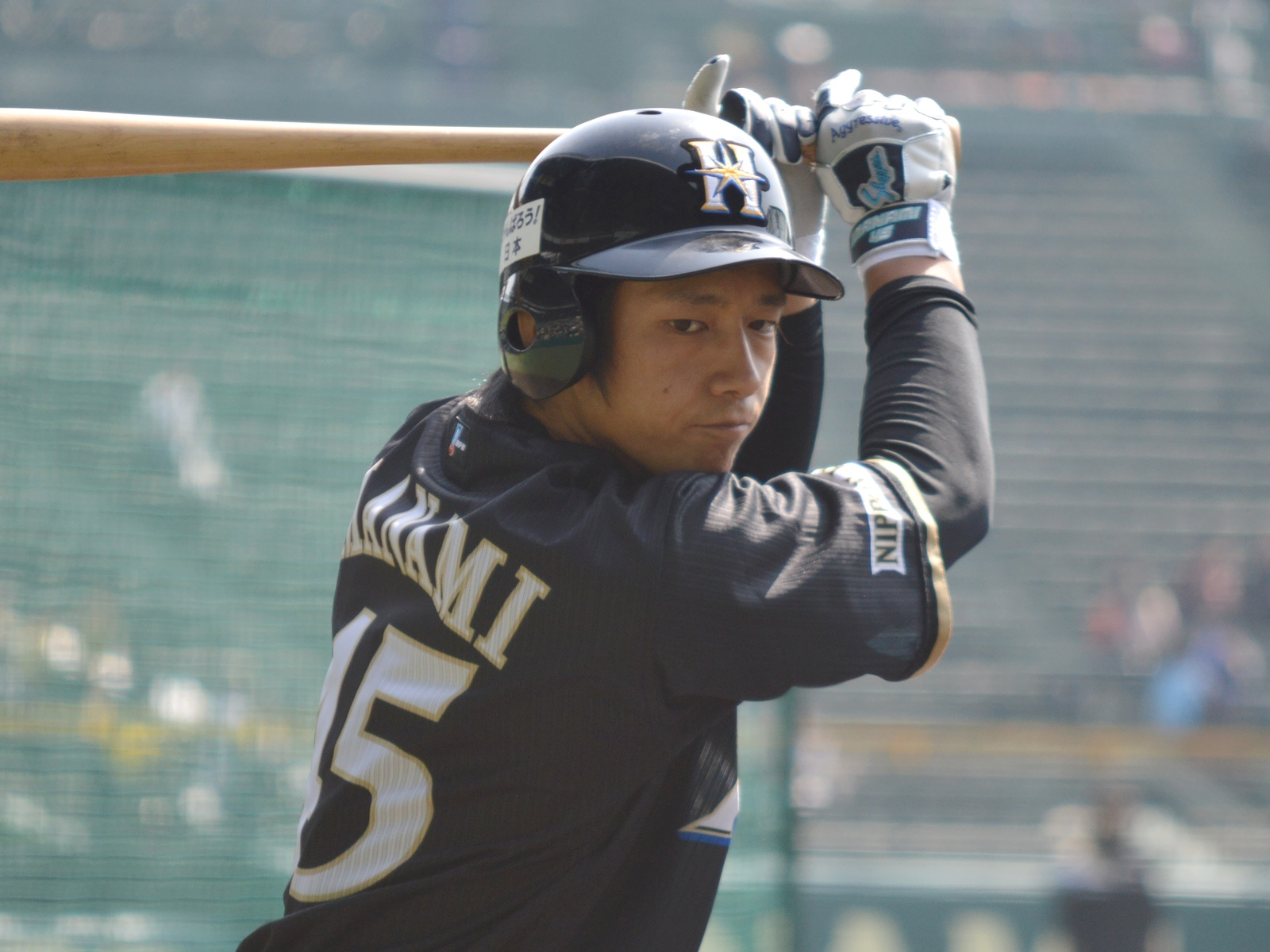
- Infielder
- Born: July 6, 1984 (age 41); Kitakyushu, Fukuoka
- Batted: Left Threw: Right

NPB debut
- August 20, 2008, for the Hokkaido Nippon-Ham Fighters

Last NPB appearance
- May 27, 2017, for the Tokyo Yakult Swallows

Career statistics (through 2017 season)
- Batting average: .261
- Hits: 196
- Home runs: 3
- Stats at Baseball Reference

Teams
- Hokkaido Nippon-Ham Fighters (2007–2014); Tokyo Yakult Swallows (2014–2017)

Takahiro Imanami (今浪 隆博, Imanami Takahiro; born July 6, 1984 in Kitakyushu, Fukuoka) is a Japanese professional baseball player. He debuted in 2008. He had 11 runs.
