= Brian Sweeney =

American baseball player and coach (born 1974)

Kansas City Royals – No. 85
- Coach
- Born: June 13, 1974 (age 51); Yonkers, New York, U.S.
- Batted: Right Threw: Right

Professional debut
- MLB: August 16, 2003, for the Seattle Mariners
- NPB: March 29, 2007, for the Hokkaido Nippon-Ham Fighters

Last appearance
- NPB: October 5, 2009, for the Hokkaido Nippon-Ham Fighters
- MLB: October 1, 2010, for the Seattle Mariners

MLB statistics
- Win–loss record: 4–2
- Earned run average: 3.38
- Strikeouts: 54

NPB statistics
- Win–loss record: 23–21
- Earned run average: 4.10
- Strikeouts: 204
- Stats at Baseball Reference

Teams
- Seattle Mariners (2003); San Diego Padres (2004, 2006); Hokkaido Nippon-Ham Fighters (2007–2009); Seattle Mariners (2010); As coach: Cleveland Indians / Guardians (2018–2022); Kansas City Royals (2023–present)

Brian Edward Sweeney (born June 13, 1974) is an American former professional baseball pitcher who is currently the pitching coach for the Kansas City Royals of Major League Baseball (MLB). He played in MLB for the Seattle Mariners and San Diego Padres and in Nippon Professional Baseball (NPB) for the Hokkaido Nippon-Ham Fighters, in addition to coaching for the Cleveland Guardians.

== Playing career ==
Sweeney graduated from Archbishop Stepinac High School in White Plains, New York in 1992. He graduated from Mercy College in New York, where he was a starting pitcher.

After making his major league debut with the Seattle Mariners in 2003, Sweeney moved to San Diego in 2004 and then signed with Japan's Hokkaido Nippon Ham Fighters.

He signed a minor league contract with the Seattle Mariners and reported to Tacoma Rainiers on April 15, 2010.

On June 15, 2010, he was called up to replace Ian Snell, who was designated for assignment.

On November 3, 2010, Sweeney was claimed off waivers by the Arizona Diamondbacks.

Sweeney signed a minor league contract with the New York Mets on May 5, 2011. On January 27, 2012, he signed a minor league contract with the Seattle Mariners.

In 2013, he represented Italy at the World Baseball Classic.

== Coaching career ==
The Philadelphia Phillies named Sweeney as pitching coach for their rookie league Gulf Coast League Phillies for the 2015 season. From 2016 to 2017, he was the pitching coach for their Single-A affiliate Lakewood BlueClaws.

Sweeney was hired by the Indians as a major league coach on December 11, 2017. Sweeney was promoted to bullpen coach on October 31, 2019.

On December 1, 2022, the Kansas City Royals hired Sweeney as their pitching coach for the 2023 season.

He has also been the pitching coach for Team Italy at the WBC in both 2017 and 2023.
