= Yusuke Uemura =

Japanese baseball player

- Pitcher
- Born: July 5, 1988 (age 37); Ibaraki, Osaka, Japan
- Bats: Right Throws: Right

debut
- 2008, for the Hokkaido Nippon-Ham Fighters

Career statistics (through 2012 season)
- WHIP: 1.250
- ERA: 3.75
- SO: 12
- Stats at Baseball Reference

Teams
- Hokkaido Nippon-Ham Fighters (2008–2013)

Yusuke Uemura (植村 祐介, Uemura Yūsuke) is a Japanese professional baseball player. He was born on July 7, 1988. He debuted in 2008. He had 12 strikeouts in 2012.
