= Minoru Iwata =

Japanese baseball player

Minoru Iwata 岩田 稔
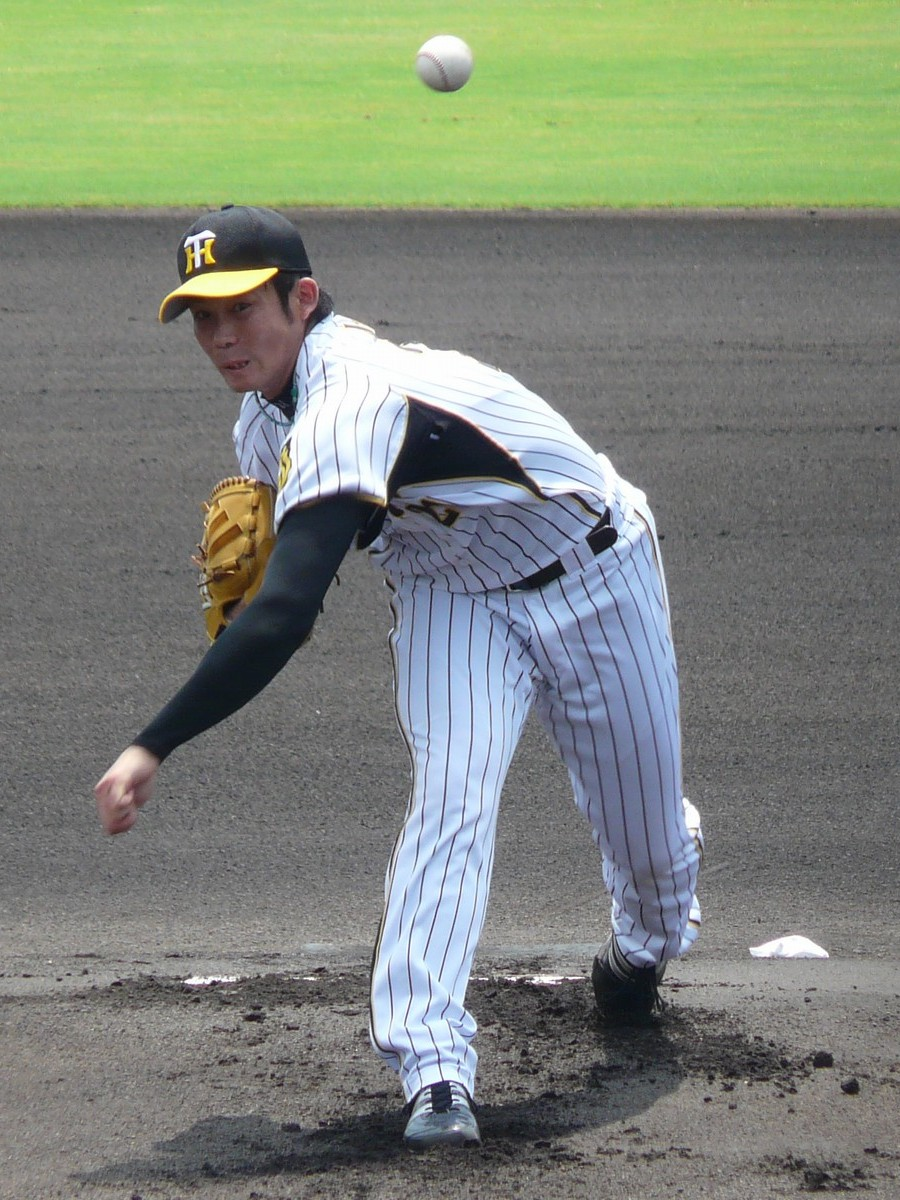
- Iwata with the Hanshin Tigers
- Pitcher
- Born: October 31, 1983 (age 41); Moriguchi, Osaka, Japan
- Bats: Left Throws: Left

NPB debut
- October 14, 2006, for the Hanshin Tigers

NPB statistics (through 2020 season)
- Win–loss: 60-82
- ERA: 3.39
- Strikeouts: 851

Teams
- Hanshin Tigers (2006 – 2021)
Medals
Representing Japan
Men's baseball
World Baseball Classic
Gold medal – first place	2009 Los Angeles	Team

Minoru Iwata (岩田 稔; born October 31, 1983) is a Japanese baseball pitcher from Moriguchi, Osaka, Japan and he currently plays for the Hanshin Tigers. He was a member of the Japan team in the 2009 World Baseball Classic.

== Early years ==
Iwata entered Osaka Toin High School in 1998. He became the ace pitcher in the autumn 1999 (his 2nd year of senior high school) and contributed to the school's winning the Osaka High School Baseball Autumn Tournament and advancing to the quarterfinal in the Kansai High School Baseball Autumn Tournament. However, he contracted type 1 diabetes in the winter of his second year. At the time of his diagnosis he had an agreement to join a successful company team after graduation, however the agreement was withdrawn after the company learned of his illness. His treating doctor allowed him to continue playing baseball as part of a balanced lifestyle necessary to stabilize the symptoms of diabetes. After graduating high school he entered Kansai University in 2001, where he was the school team's ace pitcher. He had 6 wins and 10 losses in the university league.

== Nippon Professional Baseball ==
He was drafted by the Hanshin Tigers after 2005 season because of his various breaking balls. In his debut in 2006, Iwata allowed four runs in 3 innings of work and lost his only game in the season. In 2007, Iwata was 0-1 and a 5.40 ERA. In 2008, he was third in voting for the 2008 Central League Rookie of the Year Award, trailing Tetsuya Yamaguchi and Hayato Sakamoto after going 10-10 with a 3.28 ERA and 101 strikeouts.

Iwata missed the 2010 season. The following season, he had a 9-13 record, a 2.29 ERA, and 133 strikeouts in 25 starts.

== 2009 World Baseball Classic ==
He was selected to play for Japan in the 2009 World Baseball Classic replacing Hiroki Kuroda due to his shoulder problems.
