= Micheal Nakamura =

Japanese-born Australian baseball player (born 1976)

MICHAEL Micheal Nakamura
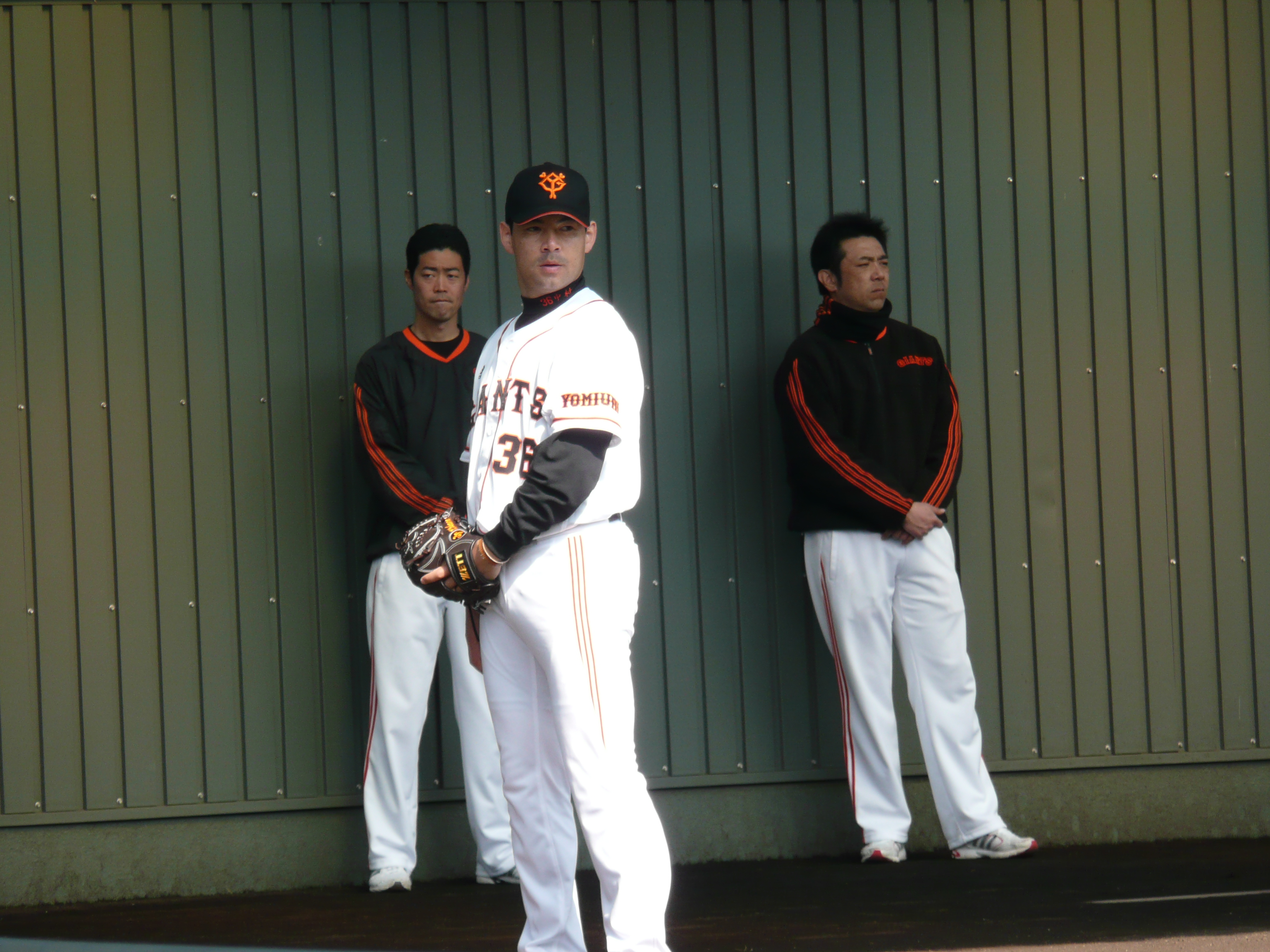
- Pitcher
- Born: September 9, 1976 (age 49); Nara, Japan
- Batted: Right Threw: Right

Professional debut
- MLB: June 7, 2003, for the Minnesota Twins
- NPB: March 29, 2005, for the Hokkaido Nippon-Ham Fighters

Last appearance
- MLB: July 31, 2004, for the Toronto Blue Jays
- NPB: September 9, 2012, for the Saitama Seibu Lions

MLB statistics
- Win–loss record: 0–3
- Earned run average: 7.51
- Strikeouts: 38
- Saves: 1

NPB statistics
- Win–loss record: 14–9
- Earned run average: 2.61
- Strikeouts: 294
- Saves: 104
- Stats at Baseball Reference

Teams
- Minnesota Twins (2003); Toronto Blue Jays (2004); Hokkaido Nippon-Ham Fighters (2005–2008); Yomiuri Giants (2009–2011); Saitama Seibu Lions (2012)

Career highlights and awards
- NPB: Pacific League Saves Champion (2006); 2× Japan Series champion (2006, 2009)

Member of the Australian

Baseball Hall of Fame
- Induction: 2016

Micheal Yoshihide Nakamura (マイケル中村, Maikeru Nakamura; born September 6, 1976), also known as "MICHAEL" in NPB, is a Japanese-born Australian former professional baseball pitcher who played for the Minnesota Twins and Toronto Blue Jays of Major League Baseball (MLB) and the Hokkaido Nippon-Ham Fighters, Yomiuri Giants and Saitama Seibu Lions of Nippon Professional Baseball (NPB).

He was educated at the Knox School and Wesley College, Melbourne.

== Career ==
Nakamura was born to an Australian mother and Japanese father. The family moved to Australia when he was 3 years old, and Nakamura later moved to the United States after signing with the Minnesota Twins in 1997. Despite having participated on the Australian Olympic baseball team in 1996 and 2000, Nakamura was not successful in Major League Baseball; he pitched in only 31 games from 2003 to 2004, and never recorded a win. He was traded to the Toronto Blue Jays in 2004, and was not re-signed for the next season. On July 27, 2004, Nakamura surrendered Gary Sheffield's 400th career home run.

After being cut from the majors, MICHAEL (Nakamura's registered name) sought opportunities in Japan and was drafted in the 4th round of the 2004 draft by the Hokkaido Nippon-Ham Fighters, and he debuted against the Seibu Lions on March 29, 2005. He was injured halfway through the year, but ended with a record of 3-0 and a 2.31 ERA over 32 games. He struck out more batters than innings pitched, and did not give up a single run in the second half of the season.

In his second year MICHAEL made 39 saves, setting a new Pacific League single-season record, and the Fighters won the Japanese championship series. Nakamura pitched in four Japanese championship series games, and did not give up a single hit. He has since been traded from the Fighters and signed for the Yomiuri Giants.

MICHAEL retired as a member of the Saitama Seibu Lions after the conclusion of the 2012 season.

== International career ==
Nakamura represented Australia at the 1996 Summer Olympics in Atlanta and 2000 Summer Olympics in Sydney. He had four appearances out of the bullpen in Atlanta and three appearances in Sydney games.

== Pitching style ==
Nakamura throws sidearm and relies mostly on two types of curves and a fastball around 90 mph. One of his curves has a movement resembling a slider (some commentators have called it a slurve), while the other has a wide break.
