= Atsunori Inaba =

Japanese professional baseball manager, coach and former player

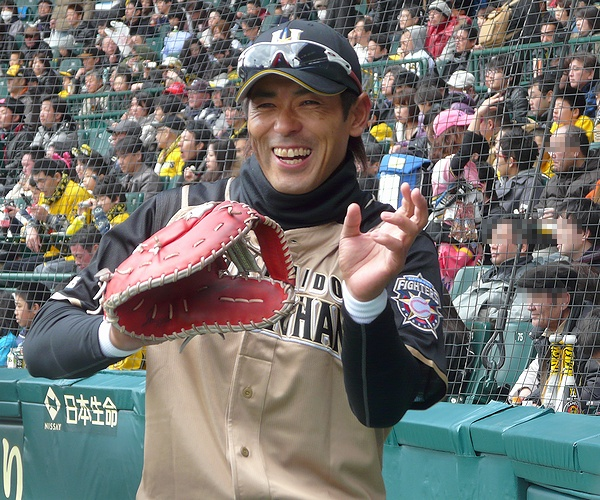

Hokkaido Nippon-Ham Fighters – No. 90
- Farm Manager
- Born: August 3, 1972 (age 53); Kitanagoya, Aichi, Japan
- Bats: Left Throws: Left

debut
- June 21, 1995, for the Yakult Swallows

Career statistics
- Batting average: .286
- Home runs: 261
- Hits: 2167
- RBIs: 1050
- Stolen bases: 74
- Stats at Baseball Reference

Teams
- As player: Yakult Swallows (1995–2004); Hokkaido Nippon-Ham Fighters (2005–2014); As coach: Hokkaido Nippon-Ham Fighters (2013, 2024-present); As manager: Japan (2017–2021)

Career highlights and awards
- 8× NPB All-Star (1997, 2001, 2007–2012); 5× Best Nine Award (2001, 2006–2009); 5× Mitsui Golden Glove Award (2006–2009, 2012); Pacific League batting champion (2007); NPB All-Star Game MVP (2011 Game 3); Japan Series MVP (2006); 4× Japan Series champion (1995, 1997, 2001, 2006)
Medals
Representing Japan
Men's baseball
World Baseball Classic
Gold medal – first place	2009 Los Angeles	Team
Summer Olympics
Gold medal – first place	2020 Tokyo	Team
Asian Baseball Championship
Gold medal – first place	2007 Taichung	Team

Atsunori Inaba (稲葉 篤紀, born August 3, 1972) is a Japanese professional baseball manager, coach and former player. He was the Most Valuable Player of the 2006 Japan Series. He is currently the general manager for the Hokkaido Nippon-Ham Fighters of Nippon Professional Baseball's Pacific League.

As a player, he won the Japan Series MVP in 2006 and the Fighting Spirit Award in 2012. He is one of just eight players to win both Japan Series awards alongside Hiromichi Ishige, Hiroshi Oshita, Hisashi Yamada, Isao Shibata, Joe Stanka, Kazuhisa Inao, and Takashi Nishimoto.

After the retirement, he became Japan national baseball team at the 2013 exhibition game against Chinese Taipei, 2014 MLB Japan All-Star Series, 2015 exhibition game against All Euro, 2015 WBSC Premier12, 2016 exhibition game against Chinese Taipei, 2016 exhibition game against Mexico and Netherlands, 2017 exhibition game against CPBL All-Stars, and 2017 World Baseball Classic.

On July 31, 2017, he became Japan national baseball team manager. He managed at the 2017 Asia Professional Baseball Championship, 2018 exhibition game against Australia, 2018 U-23 Baseball World Cup and 2018 MLB Japan All-Star Series.

== See also ==
- List of Nippon Professional Baseball career hits leaders
- List of Nippon Professional Baseball players with 1,000 runs batted in
