= Kenji Tsuchiya =

Japanese baseball player

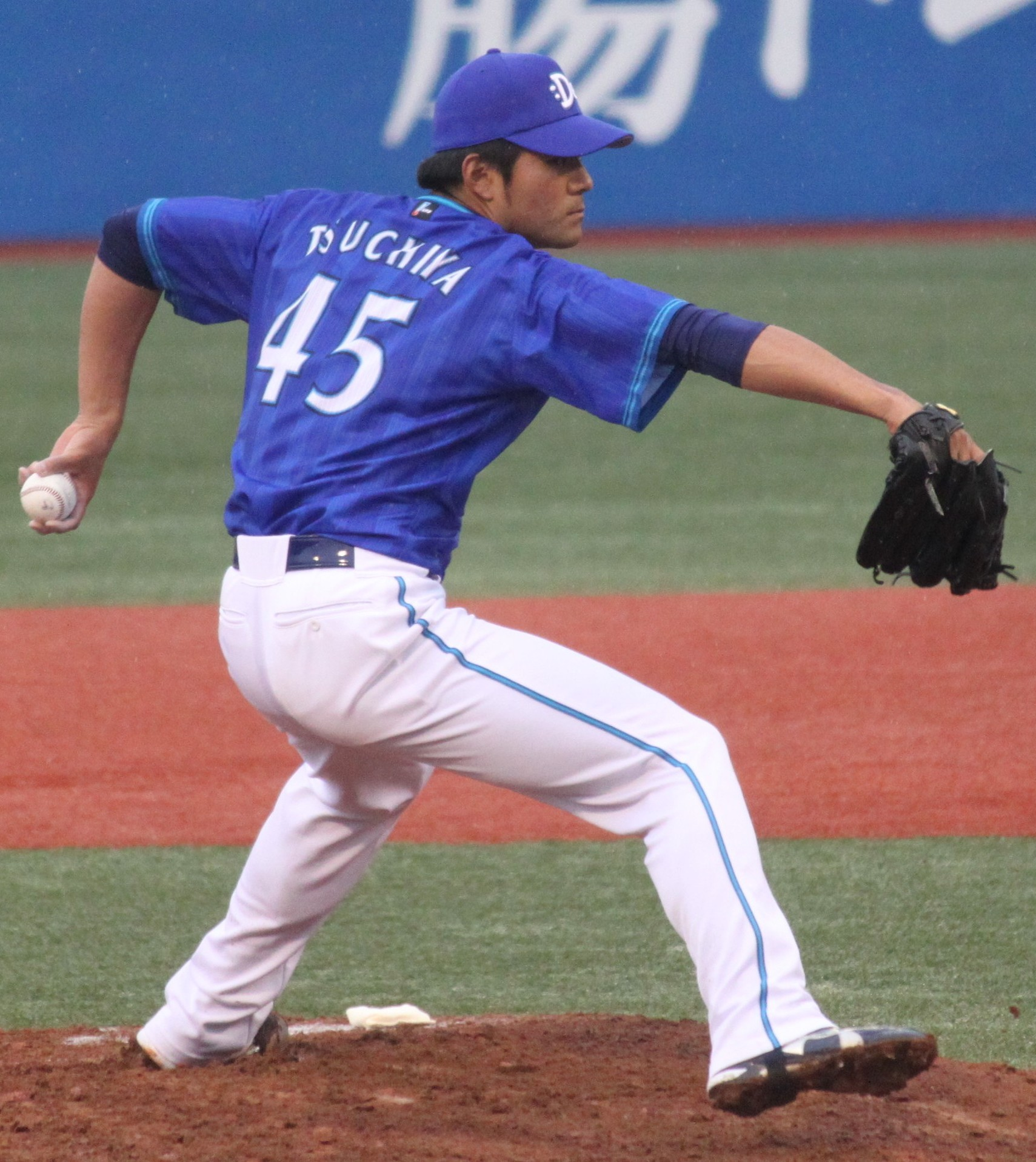
- Tsuchiya with the Yokohama DeNA BayStars
- Pitcher
- Born: October 4, 1990 (age 35); Fuji, Shizuoka, Japan
- Bats: Left Throws: Left

debut
- April 28, 2010, for the Hokkaido Nippon-Ham Fighters
- Stats at Baseball Reference

Teams
- Hokkaido Nippon-Ham Fighters (2009–2010); Yokohama DeNA BayStars (2013–2015)

Kenji Tsuchiya (土屋 健二, Tsuchiya Kenji; born October 4, 1990) is a professional Japanese baseball player.
