= Kazuyuki Atsuzawa =

Japanese baseball player

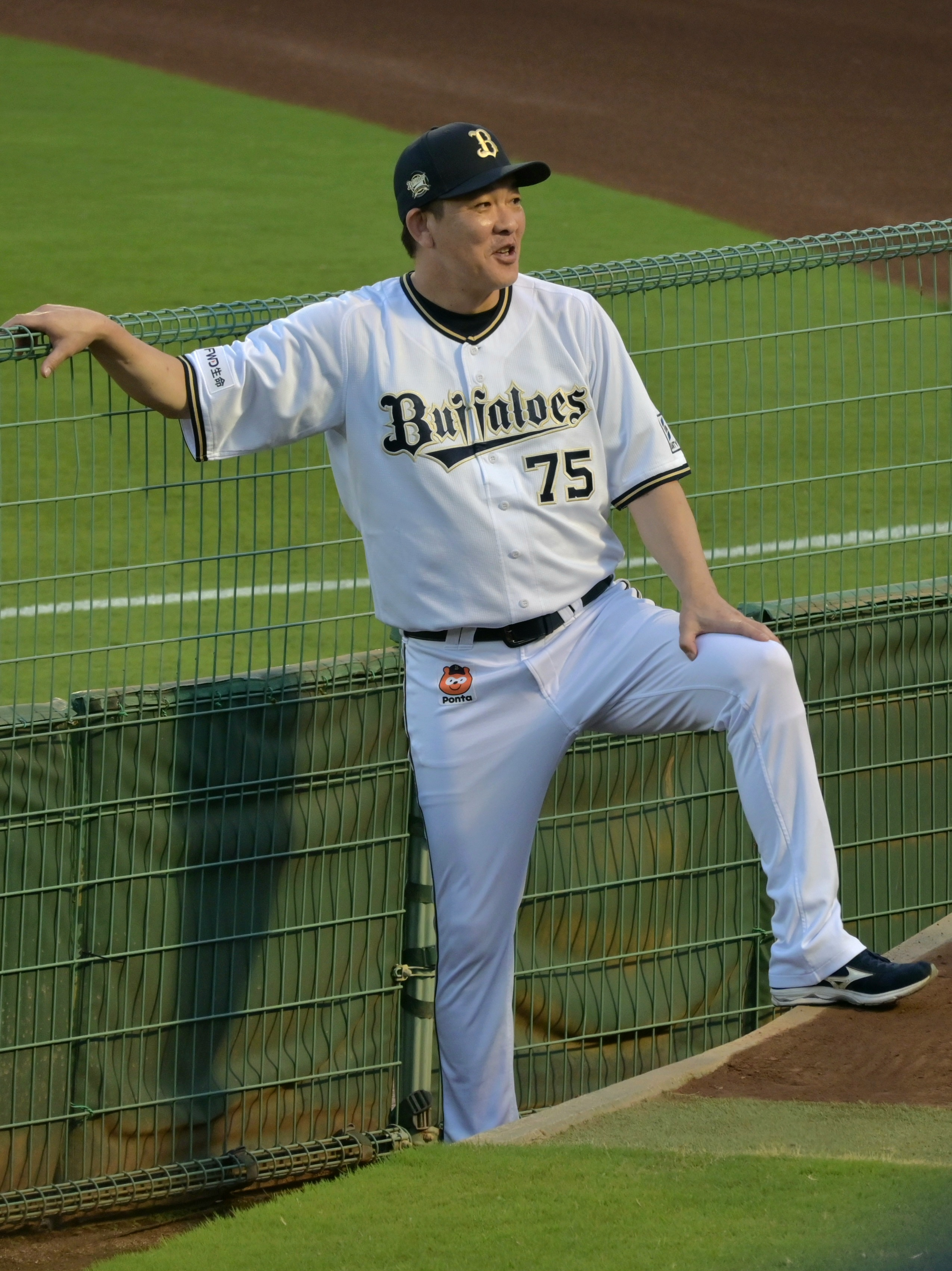

Orix Buffaloes – No. 75
- Pitcher / Coach
- Born: August 11, 1972 (age 53); Saitama, Japan
- Batted: Left Threw: Left

NPB debut
- May 14, 1995, for the Nippon Ham Fighters

Last NPB appearance
- September 6, 2003, for the Nippon Ham Fighters

NPB statistics (through 2003)
- Win–loss record: 0–4
- Earned run average: 5.37
- Strikeouts: 59
- Saves: 0

Teams
- As player: Nippon Ham Fighters (1995 – 2003); As coach: Hokkaido Nippon-Ham Fighters (2004 – 2010, 2014 – 2021); Orix Buffaloes (2022 - present)

Kazuyuki Atsuzawa (厚澤 和幸, Atsuzawa Kazuyuki; born August 11, 1972) is a retired Japanese Nippon Professional Baseball player. He is the current pitching coach for the Orix Buffaloes.
