= Ryota Imanari =

Japanese baseball player (born 1987)

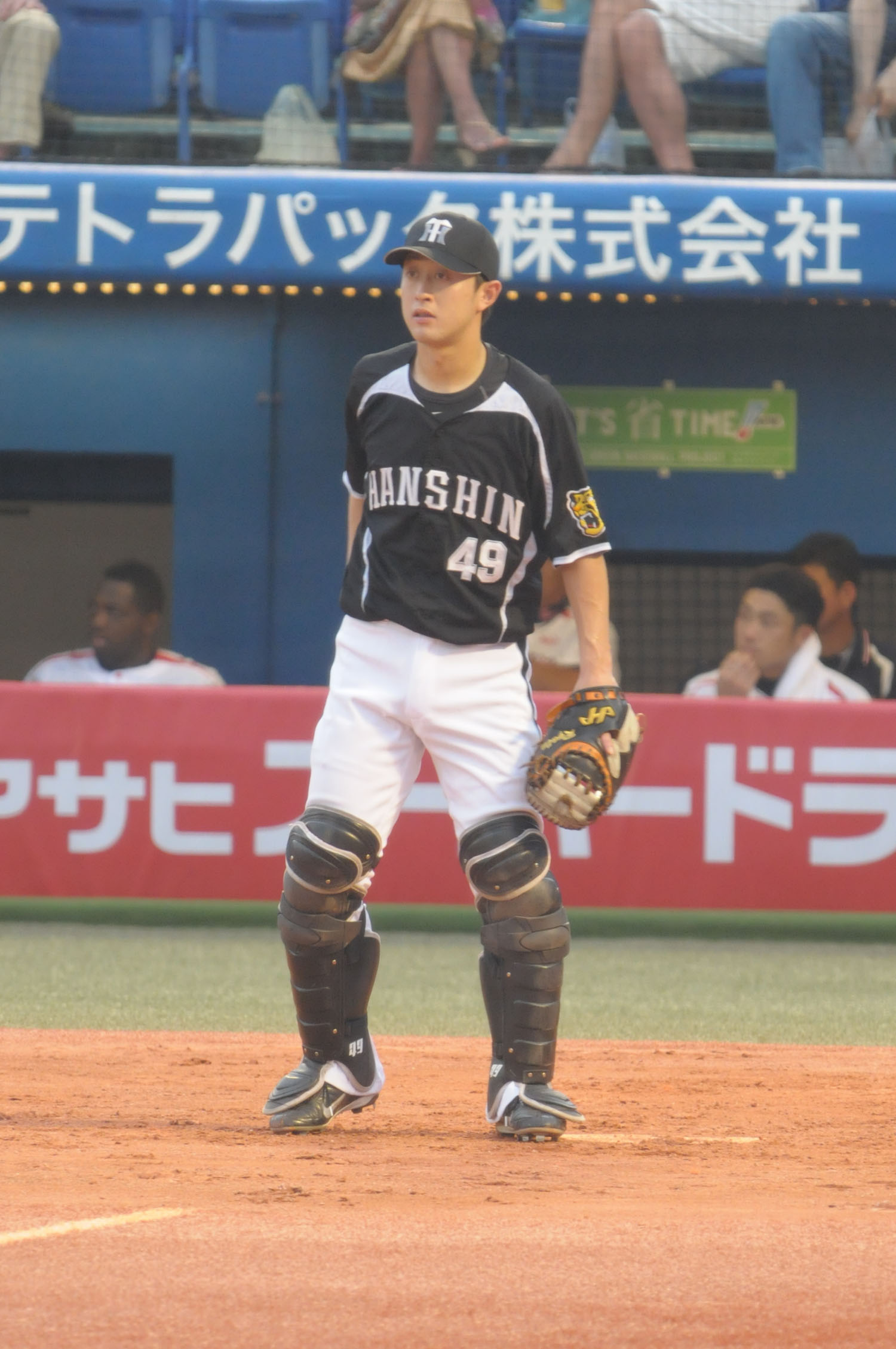
- Imanari with the Hanshin Tigers
- Infielder
- Born: October 6, 1987 (age 38)
- Bats: Left Throws: Right

NPB debut
- 2008, for the Hokkaido Nippon-Ham Fighters

NPB statistics (through 2016)
- Batting average: .265
- Home runs: 6
- RBI: 68

Teams
- Hokkaido Nippon-Ham Fighters (2008, 2010–2011); Hanshin Tigers (2012 – 2016)

Ryota Imanari (今成 亮太, born October 6, 1987, in Fujimi, Saitama) is a Japanese former professional baseball infielder in Japan's Nippon Professional Baseball. He played for the Hokkaido Nippon-Ham Fighters in 2008, 2010, and 2011, and for the Hanshin Tigers from 2012 to 2016.

== Early baseball career ==
Ryota started playing baseball even before he entered grade school. In junior high, he was also a member of the school's soccer club and even played in the Saitama Prefecture soccer tournament. He entered Urawa Gakuin, a high-school in Saitama known for its baseball team. In his second year, he was elected as team captain, and as a catcher led his team to participate in the Summer Koshien Tournament and the Spring Invitational Tournament.

He was the Fighter's 4th pick in the 2005 draft.

== Nippon Ham Fighters ==
2006: In his rookie year, he played as a catcher in the team's farm league games, and participated in the Miyazaki Phoenix League during the latter half of the season.

2008: He appeared in his first ichi-gun game on the March 25 game with the Lions, and formed a battery with fellow rookie Akiyoshi Toyoshima during the 8th inning. His first hit as a pro came the next day when he pinch hit with the same team. On July 9, he appeared in the starting line-up for the first time in the game with the Chiba Lotte Marines, where he went 3-4 and recorded his first RBI.

2009–2010: His first-squad appearances decreased with the entry of Shota Ohno. He only appeared as a pinch-hitter once in 2010.

2011: He played in a total of 22 games. He was appointed as a pinch-hitter in 19 games, and played as catcher in 6 games.

== Hanshin Tigers ==
2012

On April 28, 2012, he was transferred to the Hanshin Tigers in exchange for pitcher Ryuji Wakatake, and was assigned the jersey no. 49. His father Yasuaki Imanari, is a scouting agent for the Fighters.

2013

In 2013, following the transfer of Takeshi Hidaka from the Orix Buffaloes, the team found itself with one too many catchers, and had to find a way to utilize Ryota's batting skills. During the inter-league games, he was assigned as a designated hitter, then was later on promoted to the starting line-up as a left fielder.

In the July 5–7 card with the Carps at the Mazda Zoom Zoom Stadium, he hit his first pro home-run on his first at-bat, then recorded 4 more hits as the 5th batter 2 days after. By mid-August, he was fixed as the right fielder and 6th hitter in the line-up, as Kosuke Fukudome was sidelined from an injury. But due to his limited experience as an outfielder (season total of 3 errors), he was also assigned different fielding positions depending on the situation. In season total, he played 53 games as an outfielder, 4 games as first baseman, and 3 as catcher.

During the first leg of the climax series match with Hiroshima, he hit a solo timely off Kenta Maeda during his second at-bat in the 4th inning, tying the game. This was the first time in 49 innings that the Tigers scored a hit from Maeda.
