= Naoyuki Shimizu =

Japanese baseball player

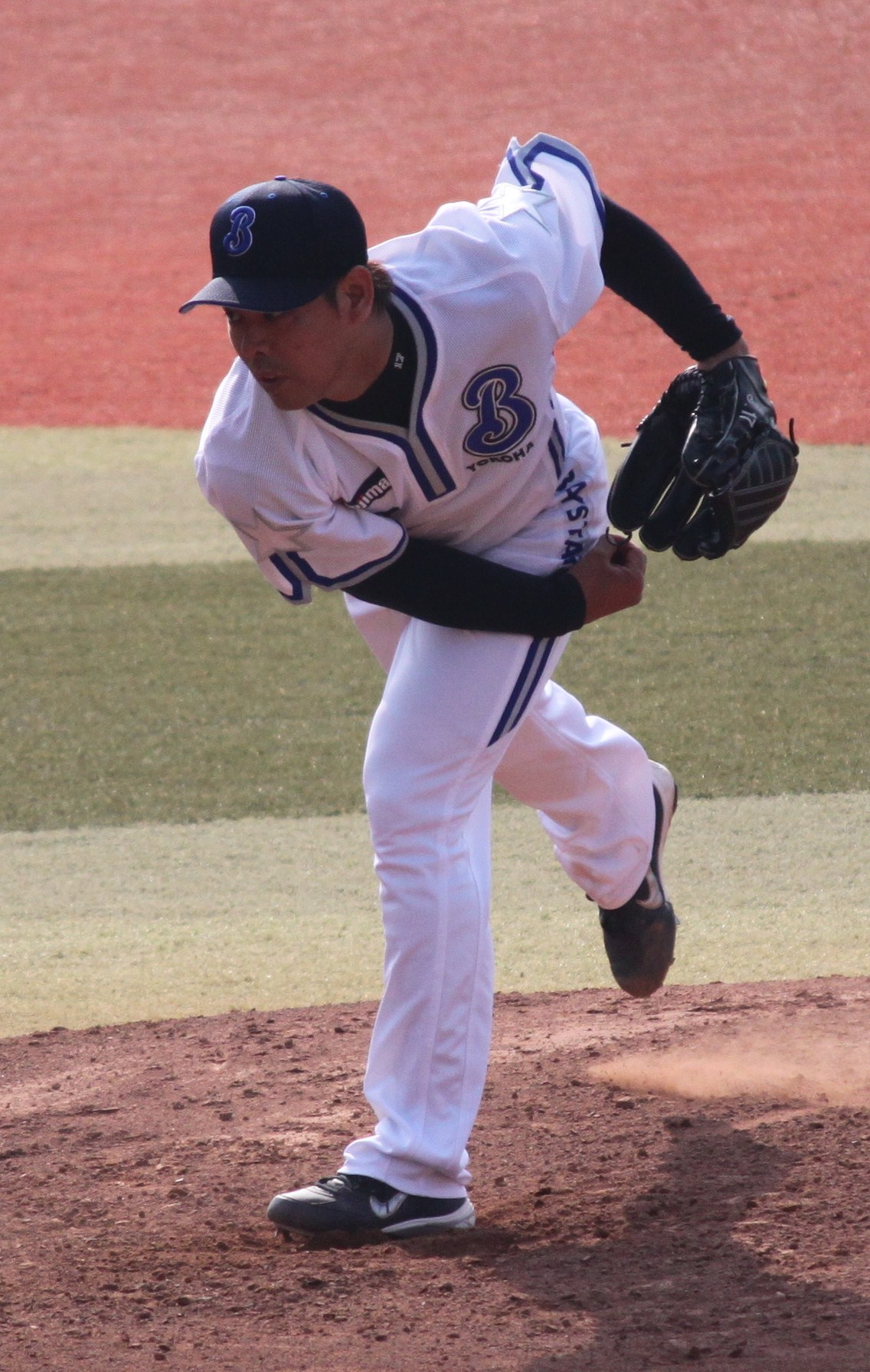

Okinawa Blue Oceans
- Pitcher / Coach
- Born: November 24, 1975 (age 50); Kyoto, Japan
- Batted: Right Threw: Right

NPB debut
- April 1, 2000, for the Chiba Lotte Marines

Last NPB appearance
- August 20, 2011, for the Yokohama DeNA BayStars

NPB statistics (through 2011 season)
- Win–loss record: 105-100
- Earned run average: 4.16
- Strikeouts: 1,154
- Saves: 0
- Holds: 0
- Stats at Baseball Reference

Teams
- As player: Chiba Lotte Marines (2000–2009); Yokohama BayStars/Yokohama DeNA BayStars (2010–2012); As coach: Chiba Lotte Marines (2018–2019); Okinawa Blue Oceans (2020–present)
Medals
Men's baseball
Bronze medal – third place	Athens 2004	Team competition
World Baseball Classic
Gold medal – first place	2006 San Diego	Team competition

Naoyuki Shimizu (清水 直行, Shimizu Naoyuki; born November 24, 1975), nicknamed "Nao", is a former professional baseball player from Kyoto, Japan. He is a starting pitcher for the Yokohama DeNA BayStars.

== Career ==
He attended Hōtoku Gakuen High School. He joined the Japanese Olympic baseball team for the 2004 Summer Olympics, and won a bronze medal. He also played with the Japanese national team in the 2006 World Baseball Classic. Tragedy struck in January 2008 when Shimizu's wife died. He has three kids.

After ten seasons with the Chiba Lotte Marines from 2000 to 2009, Shimizu became a free agent and signed with the Yokohama BayStars. His career numbers with the Marines were 93 wins against 85 losses, with a career 4.02 ERA, tossing 38 complete games and nine shutouts.
