= Chiyodai Baseball Stadium =

Stadium in Hakodate, Hokkaidō, Japan

Coordinates: 41°47′6.45″N 140°44′47.83″E

HakodateChiyogadai Baseball Stadium
- Hakodate Ocean Stadium
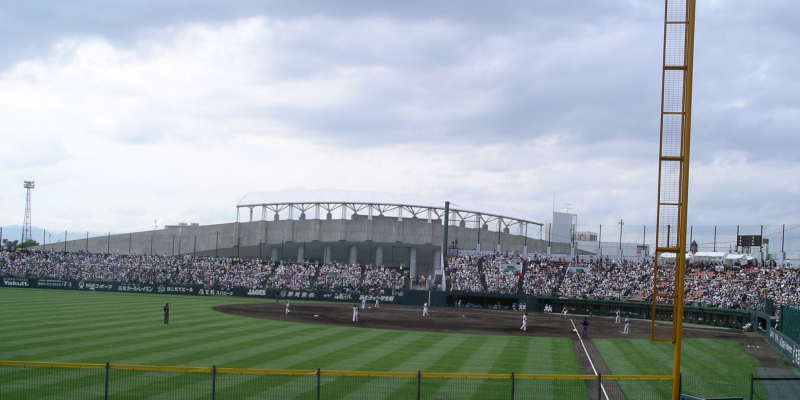
- Interactive map of HakodateChiyogadai Baseball Stadium
- Location: Hakodate, Hokkaido, Japan
- Owner: Hakodate city
- Capacity: 20,000
- Field size: left - 99.1 m (325 ft) center - 122 m (400.3 ft) right - 99.1 m (325 ft)

Construction
- Opened: 1950

Tenant
- Japanese High School Baseball Championship Southern Hokkaido Regional

Chiyodai Baseball Stadium is a baseball stadium in Hakodate, Hokkaidō, Japan. The stadium has an all-seated capacity of 20,000.
