= Kazuya Murata (baseball) =

Japanese baseball player (born 1985)

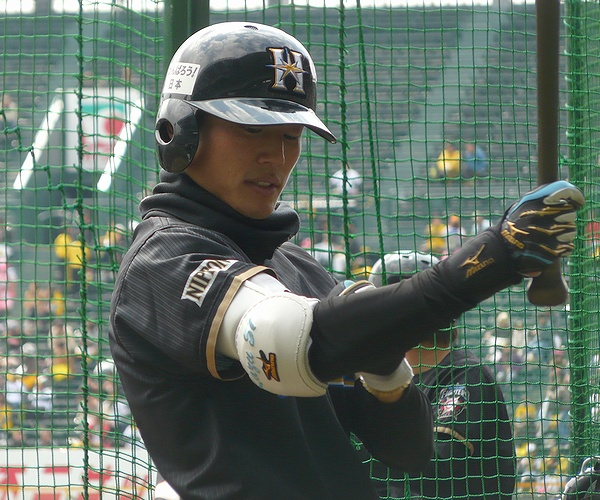
- Outfielder
- Born: July 23, 1985 (age 40)
- Bats: Right Throws: Right

NPB debut
- 2008, for the Hokkaido Nippon-Ham Fighters

NPB statistics (through 2014)
- Batting average: .251
- Home runs: 0
- RBI: 10
- Stats at Baseball Reference

Teams
- Hokkaido Nippon-Ham Fighters (2008–2014)

Kazuya Murata (村田 和哉, born July 23, 1985) is a Japanese former professional baseball outfielder in Japan's Nippon Professional Baseball. He played for the Hokkaido Nippon-Ham Fighters from 2008 to 2014.
