= Masaya Ozaki =

Japanese baseball player (born 1984)

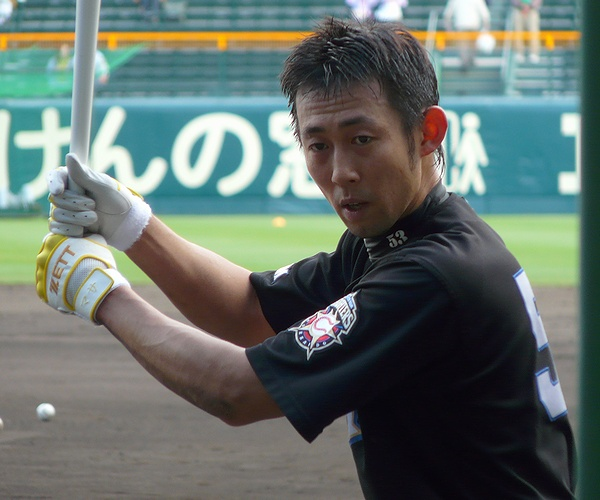
- Catcher
- Born: June 2, 1984 (age 41); Itami, Hyōgo
- Bats: Right Throws: Right

debut
- 2008, for the Hokkaido Nippon-Ham Fighters

Career statistics (through 2013 season)
- Runs: 0
- Hits: 1
- Stolen Bases: 0

Teams
- Nippon-Ham Fighters/Hokkaido Nippon-Ham Fighters (2003 – 2014)

Masaya Ozaki (尾崎 匡哉, Ozaki Masaya) is a Japanese professional baseball player. He was born on June 2, 1984. He debuted in 2008. Though debuting in 2008, he has only played three years of baseball in the NPB.
