= Takehito Kanazawa =

Japanese baseball player (born 1979)

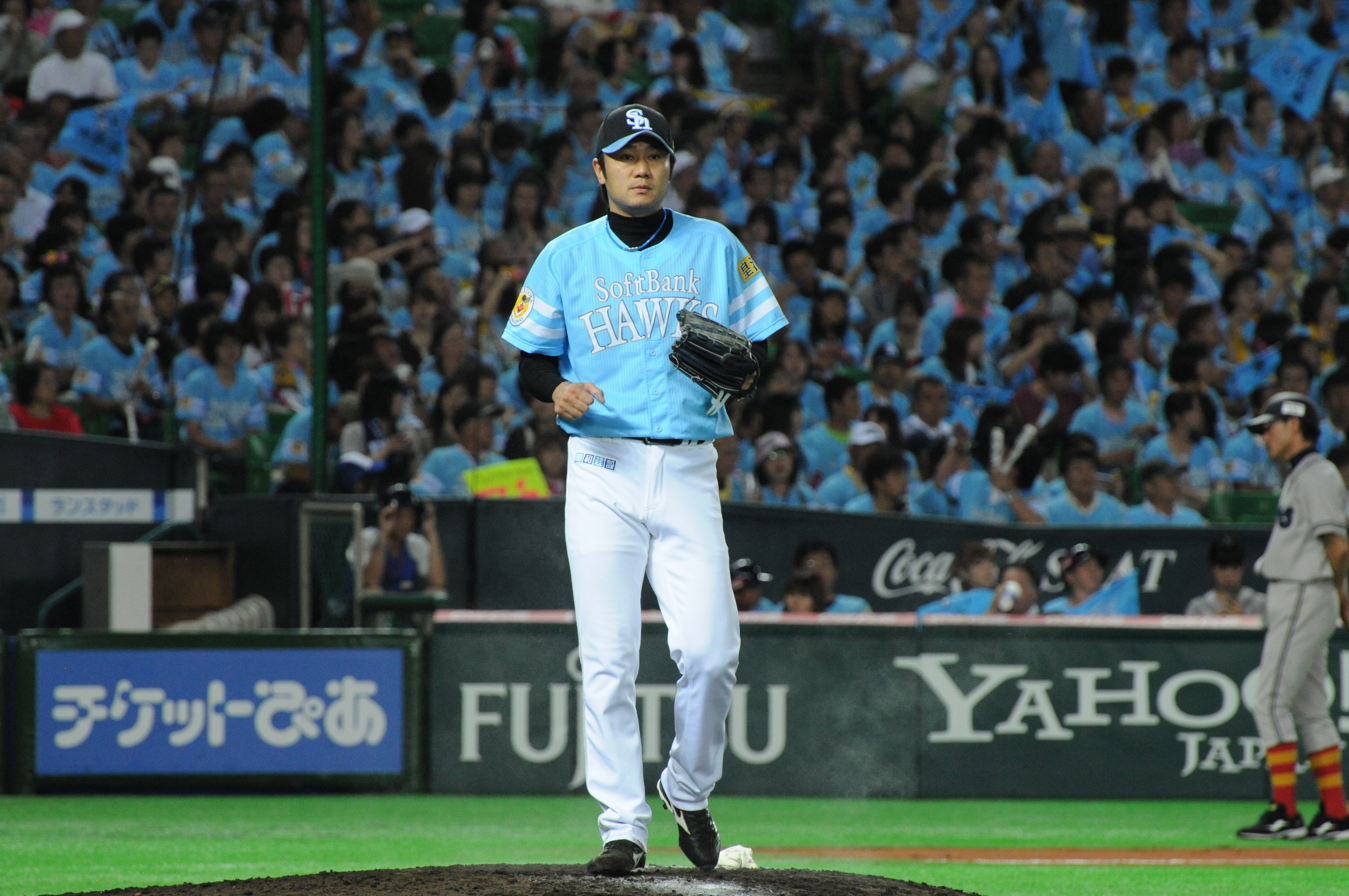
- Pitcher
- Born: January 12, 1979 (age 47)
- Bats: Right Throws: Right

NPB debut
- 2001, for the Hanshin Tigers

NPB statistics (through 2013)
- Win–loss record: 15–11
- ERA: 3.73
- Strikeouts: 287
- Stats at Baseball Reference

Teams
- Hanshin Tigers (2001–2006); Hokkaido Nippon-Ham Fighters (2007–2008); Orix Buffaloes (2009); Fukuoka SoftBank Hawks (2010–2013)

Takehito Kanazawa (金澤 健人, born January 12, 1979, in Kitaibaraki, Ibaraki) is a Japanese professional baseball pitcher for the Fukuoka SoftBank Hawks in Japan's Nippon Professional Baseball. He previously played for the Hanshin Tigers from 2001 to 2006, the Hokkaido Nippon-Ham Fighters in 2007 and 2008, and the Orix Buffaloes in 2009.
