= 2006 Japan Series =

Japanese baseball championship series

Team (Wins)	Managers	Season
Hokkaido Nippon-Ham Fighters (4)	Trey Hillman	82–54–0, (.603), GA: 1
Chunichi Dragons (1)	Hiromitsu Ochiai	87–54–5, (.617), GA: 3.5
- Dates: October 21–26
- MVP: Atsunori Inaba (Hokkaido)
- FSA: Kenshin Kawakami (Chunichi)

Broadcast
- Television: CBC (JNN, Game 1); Tokai TV and Fuji TV (Fuji Network, Game 2); TV Asahi (ANN, Game 3, 5); TV Tokyo (Game 4 aired on 6 TXN stations, Gifu Broadcasting, Mie TV, Biwako Broadcasting, KBS Kyoto, Sun TV, Nara TV and TV Wakayama)

The 2006 Japan Series, the 57th edition of Nippon Professional Baseball's championship series, began on October 21 and ended on October 26, and matched the Central League champion Chunichi Dragons against the Pacific League champion, Hokkaido Nippon Ham Fighters. The Fighters were making their first Japan Series appearance in 25 years. After the Dragons won Game 1, the Fighters won the next four games in a row to win the Series in five games.

== Summary ==
Game	Date	Visitor	Score	Home	Score	Time	Attendance
1	October 21	Nippon Ham	2	Chunichi	4	6:10 pm	38,009
2	October 22	Nippon Ham	5	Chunichi	2	6:10 pm	38,095
3	October 24	Chunichi	1	Nippon Ham	6	6:10 pm	41,798
4	October 25	Chunichi	0	Nippon Ham	3	6:10 pm	41,835
5	October 26	Chunichi	1	Nippon Ham	4	6:10 pm	42,030
Nippon Ham wins 4-1

== Game summaries ==
=== Game 1 ===
Saturday, October 21, 2006, 6:11 pm (JST) at Nagoya Dome in Nagoya, Aichi Prefecture
Team	1	2	3	4	5	6	7	8	9	R	H	E
Nippon Ham	0	2	0	0	0	0	0	0	0	2	5	1
Chunichi	0	2	1	0	0	0	0	1	X	4	6	0
WP: Kenshin Kawakami (1-0) LP: Yu Darvish (0-1) Sv: Hitoki Iwase (1)

Game 1 saw both aces pitch for their respective teams: Darvish for the Fighters, Kawakami for the Dragons. Both pitchers started off well, but Darvish, who had bouts with wildness in the regular season, saw his control unravel in the 2nd inning, giving away the 2-0 Fighters lead to which he had been staked in the top of the inning. Chunichi scratched across one more in the 3rd and one in the 8th to put the home Dragons on top, 4-2. Kawakami pitched eight innings before longtime Dragons closer Iwase shut down the Fighters in the 9th to put the Dragons on top 1 game to none.

=== Game 2 ===
Sunday, October 22, 2006, 6:13 pm (JST) at Nagoya Dome in Nagoya, Aichi Prefecture
Team	1	2	3	4	5	6	7	8	9	R	H	E
Nippon Ham	1	0	0	0	0	0	2	2	0	5	9	0
Chunichi	1	0	0	1	0	0	0	0	0	2	6	1
WP: Tomoya Yagi (1-0) LP: Masa Yamamoto (0-1) Sv: Micheal Nakamura (1); Home runs: NHF: Fernando Seguignol (1); CHU: Hirokazu Ibata (1), Kosuke Fukudome (1)

Super rookie Tomoya Yagi took the mound for Nippon Ham in Game 2, still flying high from out-dueling SoftBank Hawks ace Kazumi Saitoh. He would out-duel another veteran, this time screwballer Masahiro Yamamoto. In the battle of the lefties, the only two mistakes Yagi would make would be to Hirokazu Ibata and Kosuke Fukudome, both solo shots.

=== Game 3 ===
Tuesday, October 24, 2006 6:12 pm (JST) at Sapporo Dome in Sapporo, Hokkaido
Team	1	2	3	4	5	6	7	8	9	R	H	E
Chunichi	1	0	0	0	0	0	0	0	0	1	9	0
Nippon Ham	3	0	0	0	0	0	0	3	X	6	7	0
WP: Masaru Takeda (1-0) LP: Kenta Asakura (0-1); Home runs: CHU: None; NHF: Atsunori Inaba (1)

=== Game 4 ===
Wednesday, October 25, 2006 6:11 pm (JST) at Sapporo Dome in Sapporo, Hokkaido
Team	1	2	3	4	5	6	7	8	9	R	H	E
Chunichi	0	0	0	0	0	0	0	0	0	0	7	0
Nippon Ham	0	0	1	0	2	0	0	0	X	3	8	0
WP: Satoru Kanemura (1-0) LP: Kenichi Nakata (0-1) Sv: Michael Nakamura (2)

=== Game 5 ===
Thursday, October 26, 2006 6:12 pm (JST) at Sapporo Dome in Sapporo, Hokkaido
Team	1	2	3	4	5	6	7	8	9	R	H	E
Chunichi	0	0	0	1	0	0	0	0	0	1	8	0
Nippon Ham	0	0	0	0	1	2	0	1	X	4	8	0
WP: Yu Darvish (1-1) LP: Kenshin Kawakami (1-1) Sv: Michael Nakamura (3); Home runs: CHU: None; NHF: Fernando Seguignol (2), Atsunori Inaba (2)

Game 5 was Tsuyoshi Shinjo's last game; he had announced at the beginning of the 2006 season that it would be his last season before retirement. With the win, Shinjo ended his career in storybook fashion, finally winning his first Japan Series title. Michael Nakamura got the save for the team, getting Alex Ochoa to commit the final out with a flyout.

Manager Trey Hillman became the second foreign manager to win a Japan Series title, following Bobby Valentine, who did it the previous year. Hillman's successful season led the Texas Rangers to interview him for their managerial vacancy.

== See also ==
- 2006 World Series
