= 2021 Fukuoka SoftBank Hawks season =

2021 Fukuoka SoftBank Hawks
- League: Pacific League
- Ballpark: Fukuoka PayPay Dome
- Record: 60-62-21 (.492)
- League place: 4th
- Parent company: SoftBank Group
- General manager: Sugihiko Mikasa
- Manager: Kimiyasu Kudo

The 2021 Fukuoka SoftBank Hawks season was the 83rd season of the franchise in Nippon Professional Baseball, their 16th season under SoftBank Group, their 32nd season in Fukuoka, and their 28th season in Fukuoka PayPay Dome. This season was Kimiyasu Kudo's last season managing the Hawks, after a 6-year run. 2021 was also the first time the Hawks missed qualifying for the Climax Series play-offs after the 2013 season, and the first time they failed to maintain a .500 winning percentage since 2008.

== Regular season ==
The Hawks failed to qualify for the playoffs for the first time since 2013, going 60-62-21 with a .492 winning percentage, barely going below .500 winning percentage.

2021 Pacific League standings
| Pos | Team | GP | W | L | T | .Pct | GB | Home | Road |
|---|---|---|---|---|---|---|---|---|---|
| 1 | Orix Buffaloes | 143 | 70 | 55 | 18 | .560 | — | 38-22-12 | 32–33–6 |
| 2 | Chiba Lotte Marines | 143 | 67 | 57 | 19 | .540 | 2½ | 33-32-7 | 34–25–12 |
| 3 | Tohoku Rakuten Golden Eagles | 143 | 66 | 62 | 15 | .514 | 5½ | 31-33-8 | 35–29–7 |
| 4 | Fukuoka SoftBank Hawks | 143 | 60 | 62 | 21 | .492 | 8½ | 31-29-11 | 29–33–10 |
| 5 | Hokkaido Nippon-Ham Fighters | 143 | 55 | 68 | 20 | .447 | 14 | 25-36-10 | 30–32–10 |
| 6 | Saitama Seibu Lions | 143 | 55 | 70 | 18 | .440 | 15 | 30-34-7 | 25–36–11 |

== Roster ==
Fukuoka SoftBank Hawks roster
| First team | | Second team |
| Pitchers: 2 Carter Stewart Jr.; 10 Naoyuki Uwasawa; 11 Yūki Tsumori; 14 Jackson Rutledge; 18 Hsu Jo-Hsi; 26 Gōta Suzuki; 34 Alexander Armenta; 35 Liván Moinelo; 40 Kazuki Sugiyama; 41 Yūgo Maeda; 42 Yūsuke Itoh; 49 Haru Matsumoto; 54 Roberto Osuna; 59 Fūga Ohtake; 63 Darwinzon Hernández; 64 Taiga Kamichatani; 66 Yūki Matsumoto; 68 Hikaru Kimura; 95 Tatsuto Kobayashi; Catchers: 00 Riku Watanabe; 39 Yūdai Yamamoto; 45 Kenta Tanigawara; 55 Sōichirō Ishizuka; 62 Takashi Umino | Infielders: 0 Hikaru Kawase; 4 Jeter Downs; 5 Hotaka Yamakawa; 8 Taisei Makihara; 24 Ryōya Kurihara; 25 Yūdai Shōji; 33 Ryūta Hirose; 36 Itua Ikhine; Outfielders: 3 Kensuke Kondoh; 9 Yūki Yanagita; 23 Ukyō Shūtō; 31 Tomoya Masaki; 32 Tatsuru Yanagimachi; 44 Yoshiyasu Sasagawa; 57 Riku Ogata; 61 Yūto Kawamura; Manager: 90 Hiroki Kokubo; Coaches: 94 Shinji Kurano (Chief pitching/Head coordinator); 72 Kenichi Wakatabe (Bullpen pitching); 71 Kenichi Nakata (Assistant bullpen pitching); 93 Arihito Muramatsu (Chief fielding); 78 Yūya Hasegawa (Batting/skill); 80 Yūichi Honda (Infield defense/base running/strategy); 79 Takayuki Ōnishi (Outfield defense/base running/strategy); 87 Tōru Hosokawa (Battery) | Pitchers: 13 Ryūta Inagawa; 16 Nao Higashihama; 17 Chang Chun-Wei; 19 Ryōsuke Ohtsu; 20 Taito Murakami; 22 Haruto Fujiwara; 27 Shunsuke Iwai; 28 Shun Antoku; 29 Ryūsei Ohe; 30 Toshiya Nakamura; 43 Hokuto; 47 Tomohisa Ohzeki; 48 Kouya Fujii; 50 Masato Sagara; 51 Jun Maeda; 53 Ryō Ohyama; 58 Taisei Kimura; 60 Kazuo Ohno; 69 Shunsuke Iwasaki; 85 Luis Rodríguez; Catchers: 12 Hiroki Minei; 65 Yūtarō Fujita | Infielders: 6 Kenta Imamiya; 7 Akira Nakamura; 46 Shinjirō Uno; 52 Yūto Akihiro; 56 Takanori Takahashi; 67 Sōma Ishimi; 99 Isami Nomura; Outfielders: 77 Keita Yamamoto; Manager: 88 Kazumi Saitoh (Second squad); Coaches: 73 Takashi Ogasawara (Chief pitching); 86 Masato Okumura (Pitching); 74 Shigeru Morikasa (Batting); 91 Keisuke Kaneko (Infield defense/base running); 96 Ryūma Kidokoro (Outfield defense/base running); 84 Hiroaki Takaya (Battery); Third squad: 92 Motoi Ōkoshi (Manager); 97 Felipe (Chief pitching); 76 Hayato Terahara (Pitching); 75 Noriyoshi Ohmichi (Batting); 82 Tomoki Takata (Infield defense/base running); 98 Fumikazu Takanami (Outfield defense/base running); 83 Masaumi Shimizu (Battery); Fourth squad: 014 Takashi Sasagawa (Chief/defense/base running); 013 Kazuhisa Makita (Pitching); 018 Masahiro Nakatani (Batting); Coordinators: 012 Hidetaka Kawagoe (General farm pitching); 020 Jyunji Hoshino (Pitching); 023 Hisao Arakane (General fielding); 019 Kōichi Sekikawa (Fielding); 022 Hiroyuki Mori (Fielding); 021 Tatsuya Ide (Fielding); 011 Hiroshi Narahara (General fielding advisor) |
Development Players
128 Shinichirō Kawano (P); 137 Kenshirō Tsukayama (P); 138 Yūta Aihara (P); 140 Kōichirō Okada (P); 146 Ryūsei Ohya (P); 149 Taiga Kumagai (P); 152 Dan Shioji (P); 155 Renta Nagasaki (P); 125 Sou Ohtomo (C); 133 Kanta Ikeda (C); 121 Zairen (IF); 127 Yūki Hirose (IF); 144 Ayumu Ezaki (IF); 150 Reo Ōhashi (IF); 174 Jonathan Moreno (IF); 143 Kōha Gyofu (OF); 147 Hayato Kinoshita (OF); 151 Takahiro Suzuki (OF); 158 Emil (OF)
| Updated October 30, 2026 | | → All NPB rosters |
