= List of current foreign Nippon Professional Baseball players =

In Nippon Professional Baseball, players born outside of Japan are often known as international players. This list includes all international players who are currently on NPB 70-man rosters and thus eligible to play in Nippon Professional Baseball or either of the two "ni-gun" leagues, the Western League and the Eastern League. As both the Central League and Pacific League have a limit on foreign players on the 28-man first team (ichi-gun) rosters (maximum of four foreign players which must be a mix of pitchers and position players). This list does include foreign-born players who qualify as Japanese through residency, such as Yaku Cho and Wladimir Balentien, but does not include Japanese-born players who are eligible for other national teams, such as Yuma Mune and Brandon Tysinger.

List is accurate as of September 18, 2026:

Player	Position	Debut season	NPB Team(s)	Nationality	Notes
Albert Abreu	RHP	2024	Saitama Seibu Lions (2024); Chunichi Dragons (2026–present)	Dominican Republic	
Alberto Baldonado	LHP	2023	Yomiuri Giants (2023–present)	Panama	
Alexander Armenta	LHP	2026	Fukuoka SoftBank Hawks (2026–present)	Mexico	
Alexander Canario	OF	2026	Saitama Seibu Lions (2026–present)	Dominican Republic	
Mu-Heng Chen	RHP	2026	Orix Buffaloes (2026–present)	Taiwan	
Allan Winans	RHP	2026	Saitama Seibu Lions (2026–present)	United States of America	
An Ko Lin	OF	2026	Saitama Seibu Lions (2026–present)	Taiwan	
Anderson Espinoza	RHP	2024	Orix Buffaloes (2024–present)	Venezuela	NPB All-Star (2024)
Anderson Severino	LHP	2026	Hanshin Tigers (2026–present)	Dominican Republic	
Andre Jackson	RHP	2024	Yokohama DeNA BayStars (2024–2025); Chiba Lotte Marines (2026–present)	United States of America	Japan Series champion (2024); NPB All-Star (2025)
Andrés Machado	RHP	2024	Orix Buffaloes (2024–present)	Venezuela	NPB All-Star (2024)
Ariel Martínez	C/OF	2020	Chunichi Dragons (2018–2022); Hokkaido Nippon-Ham Fighters (2023–present)	Cuba	2x NPB All-Star (2023, 2024); NPB All-Star Game Fighting Spirit Award (2023)
Austin Cox	LHP	2026	Yokohama DeNA BayStars (2026–present)	United States of America	
Bob Seymour	1B	2026	Orix Buffaloes (2026–present)	United States of America	
Bobby Dalbec	1B	2026	Yomiuri Giants (2026–present)	United States of America	
Bryan Mata	RHP	2026	Yomiuri Giants (2026–present)	Venezuela	
Cam Devanney	IF	2026	Hanshin Tigers (2026–present)	United States of America	
Carson McCusker	OF	2026	Tohoku Rakuten Golden Eagles (2026–present)	United States of America	
Carter Stewart	RHP	2021	Fukuoka SoftBank Hawks (2021, 2023–2024, 2026–present)	United States of America	
Sung Chia-hao	RHP	2017	Tohoku Rakuten Golden Eagles (2017–present)	Taiwan	NPB All-Star (2021)
Cooper Hummel	C/OF	2026	Yokohama DeNA BayStars (2026–present)	United States of America	
Cristián Rodríguez	UTL	2024	Chunichi Dragons (2024–present)	Cuba	
Darwinzon Hernández	LHP	2023	Fukuoka SoftBank Hawks (2023–present)	Venezuela	Japan Series champion (2025)
Dauri Moreta	RHP	2026	Hanshin Tigers (2026–present)	Dominican Republic	
Dayán Viciedo	UTL	2016	Chunichi Dragons (2016–2024); Yokohama DeNA BayStars (2025–2026)	Cuba	3x NPB All-Star (2016, 2021, 2022); 2x NPB Golden Glove Award (2020, 2021); 2x CL Best Nine (2018, 2019); CL Batting title (2018); Interleague play CL Nippon Life Award (2021); NPB All-Star Fighting Player Award (2022
Dermis García	1B	2026	Hanshin Tigers (2026–present)	Dominican Republic	
Domingo Santana	OF	2021	Tokyo Yakult Swallows (2021–present)	Dominican Republic	Japan Series champion (2021); NPB All-Star (2024); Central League Best Nine Award (2024)
Easton Lucas	LHP	2026	Hanshin Tigers (2026–present)	United States of America	
Elehuris Montero	IF	2025	Hiroshima Toyo Carp (2025–present)	Dominican Republic	
Elvis Luciano	RHP	2026	Yomiuri Giants (2026–present)	Dominican Republic	
Emmanuel Ramírez	RHP	2025	Saitama Seibu Lions (2025–present)	Dominican Republic	
Forrest Whitley	RHP	2026	Yomiuri Giants (2026–present)	United States of America	
Franmil Reyes	OF/DH	2024	Hokkaido Nippon-Ham Fighters (2024–present)	Dominican Republic	Pacific League Best Nine Award (2024); NPB All-Star (2025)
Freddy Tarnok	RHP	2026	Hiroshima Toyo Carp (2026–present)	United States of America	
Gregory Polanco	OF	2022	Yomiuri Giants (2022); Chiba Lotte Marines (2023–present)	Dominican Republic	NPB All-Star (2024)
Hansel Marcelino	RHP	2025	Yokohama DeNA BayStars (2025–present)	Dominican Republic	
Humberto Mejía	RHP	2023	Chunichi Dragons (2023–present)	Panama	
Jason Vosler	UTL	2025	Chunichi Dragons (2025–present)	United States of America	
Jerar Encarnacion	OF	2026	Yokohama DeNA BayStars (2026–present)	Dominican Republic	
Jesús Liranzo	RHP	2026	Tokyo Yakult Swallows (2026–present)	Dominican Republic	
Jeter Downs	IF	2024	Fukuoka SoftBank Hawks (2024–present)	Colombia	Japan Series champion (2025)
Jo Hsi Hsu	RHP	2026	Fukuoka SoftBank Hawks (2026–present)	Taiwan	
Joey Lucchesi	LHP	2026	Chiba Lotte Marines (2026–present)	United States of America	
Jon Duplantier	RHP	2025	Hanshin Tigers (2025); Yokohama DeNA BayStars (2026–present)	United States of America	
José Castillo	LHP	2026	Chiba Lotte Marines (2026–present)	Venezuela	
José Osuna	UTL	2021	Tokyo Yakult Swallows (2021–present)	Venezuela	Japan Series champion (2021)
José Quijada	LHP	2026	Tokyo Yakult Swallows (2026–present)	Venezuela	
José Ruiz	RHP	2026	Yokohama DeNA BayStars (2026–present)	Venezuela	
José Ureña	RHP	2026	Tohoku Rakuten Golden Eagles (2026–present)	Dominican Republic	
Julian Tima	IF	2026	Yomiuri Giants (2026–present)	Dominican Republic	
Kyle Muller	LHP	2025	Chunichi Dragons (2025–present)	United States of America	
Leandro Cedeño	IF	2023	Orix Buffaloes (2023–2024); Saitama Seibu Lions (2025); Tokyo Yakult Swallows (2026–present)	Venezuela	
Liván Moinelo	LHP	2017	Fukuoka SoftBank Hawks (2017–present)	Cuba	Pacific League MVP (2025); Pacific League Best Relief Pitcher Award (2020); Pacific League hold leader (2020); 2× Pacific League ERA leader (2024, 2025); Pacific League Best Nine Award (2025); Pacific League Golden Glove Award (2024); 5× Japan Series champion (2017–2020, 2025); 2× NPB All-Star (2022, 2025)
Luis Perdomo	RHP	2023	Chiba Lotte Marines (2023); Orix Buffaloes (2024–present)	Dominican Republic	NPB All-Star (2023)
Luke Voit	IF	2025	Tohoku Rakuten Golden Eagles (2025–present)	United States of America	
Miguel Sanó	IF	2026	Chunichi Dragons (2026–present)	Dominican Republic	
Nash Walters	RHP	2025	Chunichi Dragons (2025); Tokyo Yakult Swallows (2026–present)	United States of America	
Neftali Soto	IF	2018	Yokohama DeNA BayStars (2018–2023); Chiba Lotte Marines (2024–present)	Puerto Rico	2x JCL home run leader (2018, 2019); JCL RBI leader (2019)
Orlando Calixte	UTL	2023	Chunichi Dragons (2023–present)	Dominican Republic	
Oscar González	OF	2025	Tohoku Rakuten Golden Eagles (2025–2026)	Dominican Republic	
Osvaldo Bido	RHP	2026	Yokohama DeNA BayStars (2026–present)	Dominican Republic	
Po-Hsiang Yang	IF	2025	Tohoku Rakuten Golden Eagles (2025–present)	Taiwan	
Rafael Dolis	RHP	2016	Hanshin Tigers (2016–2019, 2025–present)	Dominican Republic	Saves leader (2017)
Raidel Martínez	RHP	2018	Chunichi Dragons (2018–2024); Yomiuri Giants (2025–present)	Cuba	4× NPB All-Star (2022–2025); 3× NPB Saves Leader (2022, 2024–2025)
Roberto Osuna	RHP	2022	Chiba Lotte Marines (2022); Fukuoka SoftBank Hawks (2023–present)	Mexico	NPB All-Star (2023)
Rodolfo Castro	IF	2026	Hokkaido Nippon-Ham Fighters (2026–present)	Dominican Republic	
Roansy Contreras	RHP	2026	Tohoku Rakuten Golden Eagles (2026–present)	Dominican Republic	
Ruei Yang Gu Lin	RHP	2025	Hokkaido Nippon-Ham Fighters (2025–present)	Taiwan	
Sam Long	LHP	2026	Chiba Lotte Marines (2026–present)	United States of America	
Sandro Fabian	OF	2025	Hiroshima Toyo Carp (2025–present)	Dominican Republic	NPB All-Star (2025)
Sauryn Lao	RHP	2026	Hokkaido Nippon-Ham Fighters (2025–present)	Dominican Republic	
Sean Hjelle	RHP	2026	Orix Buffaloes (2026–present)	United States of America	
Sean Reynolds	RHP	2026	Yokohama DeNA BayStars (2026–present)	United States of America	
Spencer Howard	RHP	2025	Tohoku Rakuten Golden Eagles (2025); Yomiuri Giants (2026–present)	United States of America	
Taylor Hearn	LHP	2024	Hiroshima Toyo Carp (2024–present)	United States of America	
Trey Cabbage	OF/1B	2025	Yomiuri Giants (2025–present)	United States of America	
Trey Wingenter	RHP	2025	Saitama Seibu Lions (2025–present)	United States of America	
Tyler Nevin	IF	2025	Saitama Seibu Lions (2025–present)	United States of America	
Yi-Lei Sun	RHP	2025	Hokkaido Nippon-Ham Fighters (2025–present)	Taiwan	
Yunior Marte	RHP	2025	Chunichi Dragons (2025); Tohoku Rakuten Golden Eagles (2026–present)	Dominican Republic	
