= 2026 Japan Series =

Nippon Professional Baseball's championship series

Team (Wins)	Managers	Season
Fukuoka SoftBank Hawks (4)	Hiroki Kokubo	91–49–3 (.650), 11½ GA
Yokohama DeNA BayStars (0)	Ryoji Aikawa	71–69–3 (.507), 7½ GB
- Dates: October 24 – October 28
- Venue(s): Yokohama Stadium (DeNA); Mizuho PayPay Dome (SoftBank)
- MVP: Tomoya Masaki (SoftBank)
- FSA: Katsuki Azuma (DeNA)
- Umpires: Kouta Kawaguchi, Yoshiharu Yamaguchi, Kazuaki Nakou, Hiroya Yamamura, Kyohei Makita, Takayuki Ichikawa, Chikara Tsugawa

Broadcast
- Television: TBS, NHK-BS, NNN, TVer, U-Next, Hulu
- TV announcers: Kimiyasu Kudo, Daisuke Miura, Etuo Nitta, Hiromi Makihara, Nobuhiro Matsuda, Masatoshi Nanba, Koji Akiyama, Kazuhiro Sasaki, Tsuyoshi Wada, Kazato Kumazaki, Seiichi Uchikawa, Takumi Ohshiro, Kentaro Suda

The 2026 Japan Series (日本シリーズ, Nippon Shirīzu; branded as the SMBC Nippon Series 2026 for sponsorship reasons) was the championship series of Nippon Professional Baseball's (NPB) 2026 season. The 77th edition of the Japan Series, it was a best-of-seven playoff series played between the Central League (CL) Climax Series champion Yokohama DeNA BayStars and the Pacific League (PL) Climax Series champion Fukuoka SoftBank Hawks. This was the second time these two teams met in the Japan Series in just three years, both with identical records from their previous Japan Series matchup. The Hawks swept the BayStars in 4 games to take home their 13th Japan Series championship, tying the Saitama Seibu Lions for the most Japan Series championships for a Pacific League club.

Neither SoftBank nor DeNA suffered a defeat in their roads to the Japan Series during the postseason. For SoftBank, after sweeping Hokkaido Nippon-Ham Fighters in the Climax Series Final Stage, they returned to the Japan Series for the third consecutive year, now as the defending champion. This was their 23rd overall appearance. For DeNA, they swept the Yomiuri Giants in the Climax Series First Stage, and then swept the Hanshin Tigers in the Final Stage, overcoming both a one-game ghost win advantage granted to the Tigers, as well as winning six consecutive road games across both stages of the Climax Series, to clinch their fifth Japan Series berth in club history.

Game 2 of the 2026 Japan Series was the last game in Nippon Professional Baseball not to feature the designated hitter, as the Central League will adopt the rule beginning with the 2027 season. Hawks left-hander Liván Moinelo was the last pitcher to record a plate appearance, as all other pitchers after Moinelo's final plate appearance were pinch hit for.

== Background ==
The CL seeding was not set until the very last day, October 3, of the regular season, while the BayStars were locked in 3-seed on September 26. On October 3, the Giants were still in the race of clinching the CL Championship, and the Tigers lost earlier that day to Hiroshima Toyo Carp. However, the Giants later lost their final game against the BayStars, and thus they lost the championship to the Tigers and the seeding are locked, with Tigers the 1-seed, Giants the 2-seed, and the BayStars the 3-seed. For the BayStars, on the day they were locked in 3-seed, they were two games above .500 and 7½ games behind the Tigers. They won two of their remaining four games, finishing their season with a .507 record with 7½ games behind the Tigers and preventing the league winner from gaining the two-game advantage in the final stage of CL Climax Series, a new rule added this year for the Climax Series. In the first stage, the BayStars swept the Giants in a best-of-three series, and advanced to the final stage to face the Tigers. Despite having a one-game disadvantage, the BayStars swept the Tigers, winning the first four games of the stage and claimed their ticket to the 2026 Japan Series.

The Fukuoka SoftBank Hawks clinched their third straight PL championship and 22nd overall on September 17, with 11 games remaining. The Hawks secured their 90th win on October 1, and made it impossible for either of the other PL Climax Series teams to come within ten games of them. This also made the new Climax Series rule come into effect, giving the Hawks two-game advantage while changing the final stage into a best-of-seven (race-to-five) series. The Hawks hosted the Hokkaido Nippon-Ham Fighters, the winner of the first stage, and swept the next three games against the Fighters to advance to the Japan Series.

First stage
Pacific League
2	Saitama Seibu Lions	1
3	Hokkaido Nippon-Ham Fighters	2
Central League
2	Yomiuri Giants	0
3	Yokohama DeNA BayStars	2

Final stage
1	Fukuoka SoftBank Hawks	5
3	Hokkaido Nippon-Ham Fighters	0
1	Hanshin Tigers	1
3	Yokohama DeNA BayStars	4

Japan Series
PL1	Fukuoka SoftBank Hawks	4
CL3	Yokohama DeNA BayStars	0

== Summary ==
SoftBank won the series, 4–0.

Game	Date	Score	Location	Time	Attendance
1	October 24	Fukuoka SoftBank Hawks – 3, Yokohama DeNA BayStars – 1 (11)	Yokohama Stadium	4:12	33,388
2	October 25	Fukuoka SoftBank Hawks – 4, Yokohama DeNA BayStars – 3 (10)	Yokohama Stadium	3:36	33,432
3	October 27	Yokohama DeNA BayStars – 1, Fukuoka SoftBank Hawks – 2 (10)	Mizuho PayPay Dome	3:20	36,800
4	October 28	Yokohama DeNA BayStars – 2, Fukuoka SoftBank Hawks – 4	Mizuho PayPay Dome	2:33	36,840

== Game summaries ==
=== Game 1 ===
Saturday, October 24, 2026, 6:36 pm (JST) at Yokohama Stadium in Yokohama, Kanagawa
Team	1	2	3	4	5	6	7	8	9	10	11	R	H	E
SoftBank	0	0	0	0	0	0	1	0	0	0	2	3	11	0
DeNA	0	0	0	0	0	0	0	1	0	0	0	1	9	0
WP: Roberto Osuna (1–0) LP: Masaki Iwata (0–1) Sv: Kazuki Sugiyama (1); Home runs: SBH: None; DNA: Shugo Maki (1); Attendance: 33,388; Boxscore

Yutaro Ishida started Game 1 for the BayStars, while Naoyuki Uwasawa started for the Hawks. The BayStars loaded the bases in the first inning, but did not score. Ishida pitched 6 2/3 innings with five strikeouts, allowed seven hits, and gave up one run. Uwasawa pitched seven shutout innings with four strikeouts, and allowed six hits, none of which are extra base hits.

In the top of the seventh inning, the Hawks once again reached scoring position, this time with Taisei Makihara's single and Yūdai Yamamoto's double. Makihara scored on Yudai Shoji's RBI groundout. Shugo Maki's solo home run in the eighth inning tied the game, and the game remained tied after the 9th, forcing extra innings. In the bottom of the tenth, the BayStars advanced a runner to third base, but stranded him. In the top of the 11th, with runners at first and second with one out, Shoji hit a double, scoring a go-ahead run. The Hawks scored the third run with sacrifice fly by Tatsuru Yanagimachi. Kazuki Sugiyama closed it out at the bottom of the inning to seal the win for the Hawks.

Maki tied the record for the most putouts in one game as a second baseman, with nine. He is the second player in NPB history ever to do so, the first being Masuho Maeda, in the Game 5 of 1970 Japan Series.

=== Game 2 ===
Yuto Kawamura hit the game-winning home run in the 10th inning of Game 2.

Sunday, October 25, 2026, 6:03 pm (JST) at Yokohama Stadium in Yokohama, Kanagawa
Team	1	2	3	4	5	6	7	8	9	10	R	H	E
SoftBank	0	0	1	1	0	0	0	0	1	1	4	9	0
DeNA	0	0	0	0	0	0	0	3	0	0	3	10	2
WP: Darwinzon Hernández (1–0) LP: Hiromu Ise (0–1) Sv: Kazuki Sugiyama (2); Home runs: SBH: Tomoya Masaki (1), Hotaka Yamakawa (1), Yuto Kawamura (1); DNA: Yoshitomo Tsutsugo (1); Attendance: 33,432; Boxscore

In the bottom of the second inning with one out, the BayStars had two runners in scoring position with a single by Shion Matsuo and a double by Tomoya Inoue. However, Liván Moinelo struck out Shuto Naruse, then intentionally walked Tatsuo Ebina to face Shuto Ogata. With the bases loaded, Moinelo struck out Ogata in three pitches to get out of the jam.

The Hawks scored first with Tomoya Masaki's solo home run in the top of the third inning. They scored another run in the top of the fourth with Yudai Shoji's RBI double.

Moinelo threw seven shutout innings with eight strikeouts, and allowed 5 hits, two of which were doubles by Inoue. After seven scoreless innings, the BayStars had a scoring chance in the eighth, with Ryuki Watarai's single and Shugo Maki reaching on base with a hit by pitch. Yoshitomo Tsutsugo hit a 3-run home run to flip the table, helping the BayStars take a 3–2 lead. However, not long after, in the next frame, the Hawks tied the game with a solo home run by pinch hitter Hotaka Yamakawa. With runners in scoring position and a chance for a walk-off, the BayStars stranded them in the bottom of the ninth, sending the game into extra innings.

In the top of the tenth inning, Yuto Kawamura hit a home run to give the Hawks the lead. This was his first home run since 2024, and only the second of his career. Sugiyama closed out the game to secure the second win for the Hawks.

=== Game 3 ===
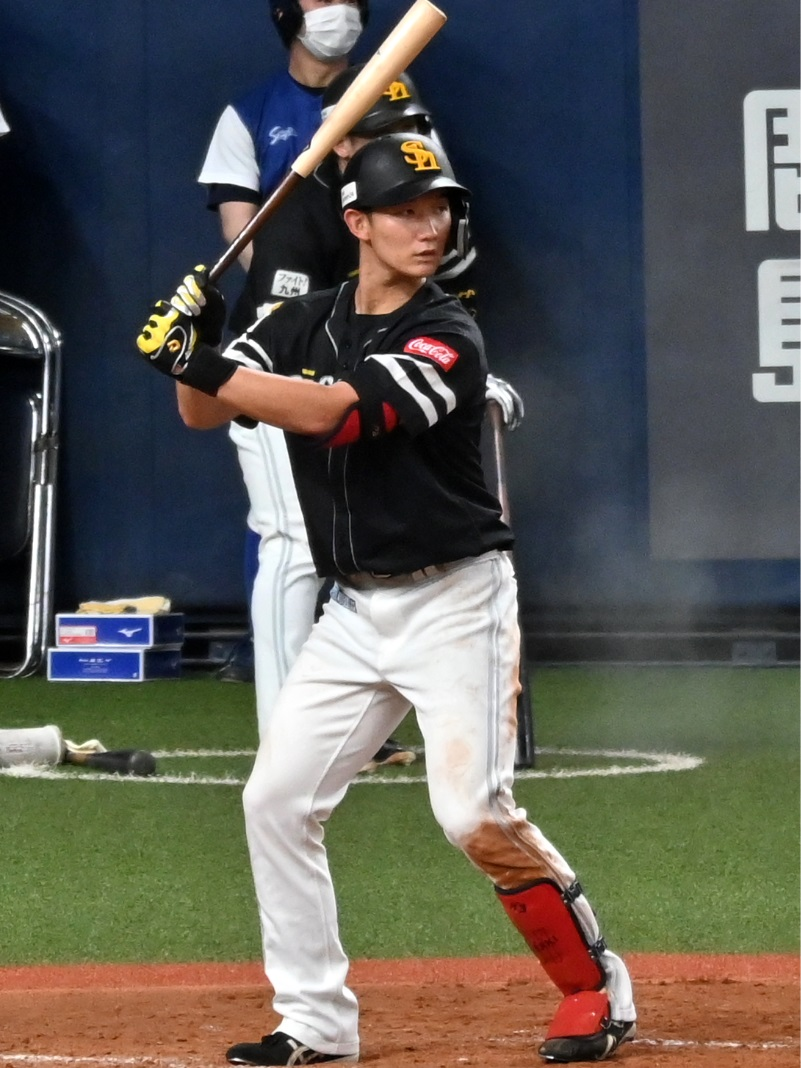
Tomoya Masaki hit the walk-off home run in the 10th inning of Game 3.

Tuesday, October 27, 2026, 6:04 pm (JST) at Mizuho PayPay Dome in Fukuoka, Fukuoka
Team	1	2	3	4	5	6	7	8	9	10	R	H	E
DeNA	0	0	0	0	1	0	0	0	0	0	1	7	0
SoftBank	0	0	0	0	0	0	0	0	1	1	2	10	0
WP: Kazuki Sugiyama (1–0) LP: José Ruiz (0–1); Home runs: DNA: None; SBH: Tomoya Masaki (2); Attendance: 36,800; Boxscore

The game went scoreless during the first four innings. During these innings, both teams had five ground balls that resulted in a double play, four of which were by the Hawks.

In the top of the fifth inning, Toshiro Miyazaki hit a single to center field, then Masaki Mimori hit a ground ball to the short stop that resulted in a force out at second. After Haru Matsumoto struck out Tomoya Inoue, Mimori stole second base during Takeru Furuichi's at-bat, and later scored on Furuichi's single to the center, giving the BayStars 1–0 lead. Furuichi attempted to reach for second base during the throw, but failed and was out at second base, ending the frame. The BayStars had another chance with runners at second and third during the next inning, but both runners got stranded.

Katsuki Azuma started Game 3 for the BayStars, while Haru Matsumoto started for the Hawks. Azuma threw seven shutout innings, with three strikeouts, two walks and two hit by pitches, and allowed 6 singles. Matsumoto, on the other hand, threw six innings with five strikeouts, allowed six hits, and gave up one run.

The game proceeded to the last inning without any team scoring. In the bottom of the ninth, Ryoya Kurihara reached scoring position with a double, however closer Sean Reynolds retired Yuki Yanagita on a fly ball to left field and struck out Hotaka Yamakawa, preventing Kurihara from advancing on either at bat. With two outs, Itua Ikhine pinch-ran for Kurihara, and scored the game-tying run with Taisei Makihara's RBI single, while Makihara reached second base during the throw. Yūdai Yamamoto was retired immediately after, ending the frame and sending the game to the extra innings for the third time in the series, the first time each of the first three games in the Japan Series went to extra innings in the competition's history.

The game ended with a walk-off home run by Tomoya Masaki in the bottom of the tenth, putting the Hawks up 3–0 in the series, one win away from back-to-back Japan Series championships.

The BayStars defense set a new record in Japan Series history, turning 5 double plays in Game 3, including four grounded-into-double-plays, and a line drive to pitcher that resulted in a double play in the bottom of the seventh. In addition, both teams defense turned 6 double plays in total, also a new record.

=== Game 4 ===
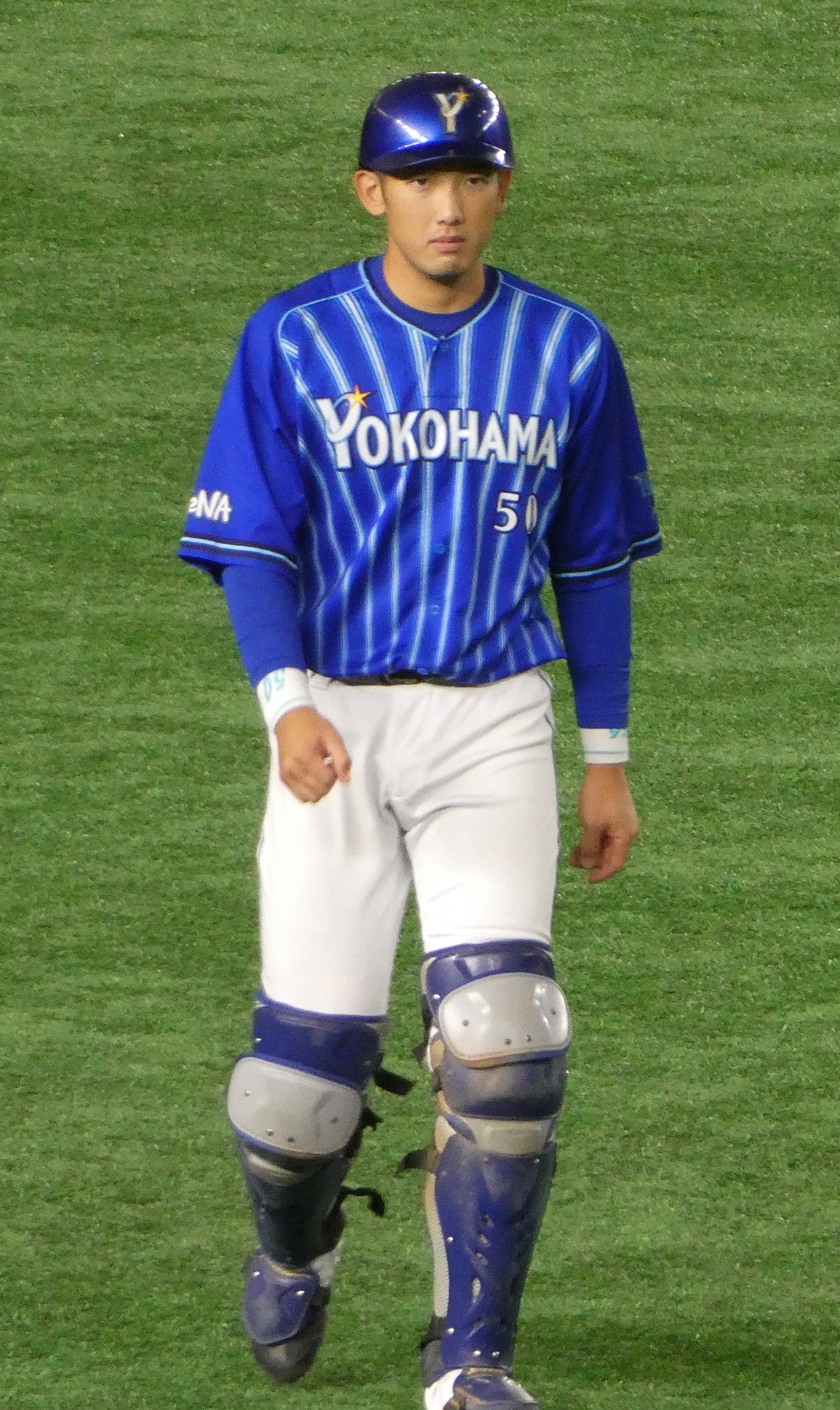
Former BayStar Yūdai Yamamoto drove in three runs for the Hawks in Game 4.

Wednesday, October 28, 2026, 6:00 pm (JST) at Mizuho PayPay Dome in Fukuoka, Fukuoka
Team	1	2	3	4	5	6	7	8	9	R	H	E
DeNA	2	0	0	0	0	0	0	0	0	2	4	0
SoftBank	0	0	0	3	0	1	0	0	X	4	5	0
WP: Darwinzon Hernández (2–0) LP: Kentarō Taira (0–1) Sv: Kazuki Sugiyama (3); Home runs: DNA: Keita Sano (1); SBH: None; Attendance: 36,840; Boxscore

The BayStars took an early lead with a two-run home run by Keita Sano in the first inning, but failed to score for the rest of the game. In the bottom of the fourth inning, Tomoya Masaki walked, then Ukyo Shuto failed a sacrifice bunt, resulting in a force out at 2nd. Shuto stole second base during Kensuke Kondoh's at-bat. After Kentarō Taira struck out Kondoh, the BayStars decided to intentionally walk Ryoya Kurihara to face Yūdai Yamamoto. This plan backfired, as Yamamoto hit a sharp line drive to right field, resulting in a 2-run triple, scoring Shuto and Kurihara. Yamamoto later scored on an RBI single from Yuki Yanagita. The frame ended after the next batter, Hotaka Yamakawa, was retired.

In the sixth inning, Shuto hit a ground ball that deflected off first baseman Sano to right field, and reached second base easily. Shuto then advanced to third on Kondoh's ground ball to second. After Kurihara received a four-pitch walk, Shuto scored on Yamamoto's sacrifice fly to left field. Yanagita retired after, ending the frame.

After the first inning, six Hawks pitchers threw a total of eight shutout innings, with Kazuki Sugiyama closing the game in the top of the ninth for the third time in the series. With Sugiyama striking out Shion Matsuo, the Hawks completed the sweep, and successfully defended their championship. They became the first team in Japan Series history to sweep their Japan Series opponent without having any of their starting pitchers record a win.

== Aftermath ==
With the series win, the Hawks won their second consecutive Japan Series championship, and their thirteenth overall. The Hawks finished the postseason with a perfect record of 7–0, becoming only the second team in the Climax Series era to go undefeated in the postseason after the 2020 Hawks went 6–0 in that year's shortened postseason.

Tomoya Masaki won the Japan Series Most Valuable Player Award and received a six million yen prize. He finished the series with a .348 batting average (7 for 16), and 2 home runs, including the walk-off home run in Game 3.

The Outstanding Player Award went to Kazuki Sugiyama, Yūdai Yamamoto, and Yudai Shoji. Sugiyama made appearances in all four games of the series, and claimed three saves and one win, with a 0.00 ERA. He tied the record for most saves in Japan Series history, and is the first player to claim three saves in Japan Series that ended in a sweep. Yamamoto finished the series with a .364 batting average (4 for 11), with all three runs batted in in Game 4. Shoji finished the series with a .267 batting average (4 for 15), with 3 RBIs and two doubles.

Katsuki Azuma was the Fighting Spirit Award winner. Hawks' captain Yuki Yanagita was once again voted the SMBC Everyone's Cheering Award winner by fans.

== Media coverage ==
The Japan Series was televised in Japan by a variety of television stations and streaming services. Five of the seven games were to be broadcast by TBS, with NHK-BS, Nippon News Network, and TV Asahi also carrying some games.All games were streamed online via TVer, with U-Next, Hulu, and Abema also streaming some games.

Game	Networks	Streaming	Commentators	Ref
1	TBS	U-Next, TVer	Kimiyasu Kudo, Daisuke Miura, Etuo Nitta	
2	TBS, NHK-BS	U-Next, TVer	Hiromi Makihara, Nobuhiro Matsuda, Masatoshi Nanba	
3	TBS, NHK-BS	U-Next, TVer	Koji Akiyama, Kazuhiro Sasaki, Hiromi Makihara, Tsuyoshi Wada, Kazato Kumazaki	
4	NNN	Hulu, TVer	Tsuyoshi Wada, Seiichi Uchikawa, Takumi Ohshiro, Kentaro Suda	

== See also ==
- 2026 World Series
- 2026 Korean Series
