= 2026 Pacific League Climax Series =

Japanese baseball series

First stage
Team (Wins)		Manager	Season
Hokkaido Nippon-Ham Fighters (2)		Tsuyoshi Shinjo	78–62–3 (.557), 13½ GB
Saitama Seibu Lions (1)		Fumiya Nishiguchi	79–60–4 (.568), 11½ GB
- Dates: October 10–12

Final stage
Team (Wins)		Manager	Season
Fukuoka SoftBank Hawks (5)		Hiroki Kokubo	91–49–3 (.650), 11½ GA
Hokkaido Nippon-Ham Fighters (0)		Tsuyoshi Shinjo	78–62–3 (.557), 13½ GB
- Dates: October 14–16

The 2026 Pacific League Climax Series was a set of two consecutive playoff series between the three top-placing teams in Nippon Professional Baseball's Pacific League (PL). The first stage started on October 10 and the final stage concluded on October 16. The first stage was a best-of-three series between the second-place Saitama Seibu Lions and the third-place Hokkaido Nippon-Ham Fighters, in which the Fighters defeated the Lions 2-1. The final stage was a first-to-five series with the Fukuoka SoftBank Hawks, the PL champion, being awarded a two-win advantage against the Hokkaido Nippon-Ham Fighters, in which the Hawks defeated the Fighters 5-0. The Fukuoka SoftBank Hawks will advance to the 2026 Japan Series to compete against the eventual winner of the 2026 Central League Climax Series.

== Background ==
For the ninth consecutive year, Persol Holdings is sponsoring the naming rights for the Pacific League Climax Series, and it is officially known as the "2026 Persol Climax Series PA".

The Fukuoka SoftBank Hawks clinched their third straight Pacific League (PL) championship and 22nd overall on September 17, with 11 games remaining. It was the team's third three-peat and their first since moving to Fukuoka, their last being from 1964 to 1966 when they were based in Osaka. The pennant is manager Hiroki Kokubo's third in his third year managing the club. Similarly to their previous season, SoftBank again started slow and were two games behind the league leader in late May. At the start of June, however, they turned things around dramatically. The Hawks clinched the PL championship on the final game of a nine-game winning streak, their longest of the year. A new Climax Series rule also took effect this season that rewards any league champion a second win advantage in the final stage if they lead the other team by ten or more games, or if the other team has a regular season record below .500. SoftBank secured this advantage on October 1 with their 90th win, which made it impossible for either of the other PL Climax Series teams to come within ten games of them.

== First stage ==
=== Summary ===
Nippon-Ham won the series, 2–1.

Game	Date	Score	Location	Time	Attendance
1	October 10	Hokkaido Nippon-Ham Fighters – 2, Saitama Seibu Lions – 3 (10)	Belluna Dome	3:06	27,602
2	October 11	Hokkaido Nippon-Ham Fighters – 1, Saitama Seibu Lions – 0	Belluna Dome	3:09	27,610
3	October 12	Hokkaido Nippon-Ham Fighters – 4, Saitama Seibu Lions – 1	Belluna Dome	3:19	27,571

=== Game 1 ===
Saturday, October 10, 2026, 2:00 pm (JST) at Belluna Dome in Tokorozawa, Saitama
Team	1	2	3	4	5	6	7	8	9	10	R	H	E
Nippon-Ham	0	0	0	2	0	0	0	0	0	0	2	7	0
Seibu	1	0	0	0	1	0	0	0	0	1X	3	8	1
WP: Taishi Mameda (1–0) LP: Haruki Hosono (0–1); Home runs: NIP: Taiki Narama (1); SEI: Taiga Hirasawa (1), Alexander Canario (1); Attendance: 27,602; Boxscore

=== Game 2 ===
Sunday, October 11, 2026, 2:01 pm (JST) at Belluna Dome in Tokorozawa, Saitama
Team	1	2	3	4	5	6	7	8	9	R	H	E
Nippon-Ham	0	0	0	0	1	0	0	0	0	1	5	2
Seibu	0	0	0	0	0	0	0	0	0	0	5	0
WP: Kōta Tatsu (1–0) LP: Kōna Takahashi (0–1) Sv: Taisei Yanagawa (1); Attendance: 27,610; Boxscore

=== Game 3 ===
Monday, October 12, 2026, 2:00 pm (JST) at Belluna Dome in Tokorozawa, Saitama
Team	1	2	3	4	5	6	7	8	9	R	H	E
Nippon-Ham	0	1	0	1	1	0	1	0	0	4	8	1
Seibu	0	0	0	0	1	0	0	0	0	1	5	1
WP: Hiromi Itoh (1–0) LP: Natsuki Takeuchi (0–1) Sv: Taisei Yanagawa (2); Home runs: NIP: Chūsei Mannami (1); SEI: None; Attendance: 27,571; Boxscore

== Final stage ==
=== Summary ===
SoftBank won the series, 5–0*.

Game	Date	Score	Location	Time	Attendance
1	October 14	Hokkaido Nippon-Ham Fighters – 4, Fukuoka SoftBank Hawks – 6	Mizuho PayPay Dome	3:14	39,894
2	October 15	Hokkaido Nippon-Ham Fighters – 2, Fukuoka SoftBank Hawks – 6	Mizuho PayPay Dome	3:04	39,894
3	October 16	Hokkaido Nippon-Ham Fighters – 2, Fukuoka SoftBank Hawks – 6	Mizuho PayPay Dome	3:02	39,894

*Under the new rule applied in this season, the Pacific League regular season champion is given a two-game advantage in the final stage, for being 13½ games ahead the first stage winner in regular season.

=== Game 1 ===
Wednesday, October 14, 2026, 6:00 pm (JST) at Mizuho PayPay Dome in Chūō-ku, Fukuoka
Team	1	2	3	4	5	6	7	8	9	R	H	E
Nippon-Ham	0	1	2	0	0	0	1	0	0	4	11	2
SoftBank	1	0	0	5	0	0	0	0	X	6	8	0
WP: Gōta Suzuki (1–0) LP: Sachiya Yamasaki (0–1) Sv: Kazuki Sugiyama (1); Home runs: NIP: Yūya Gunji (1); SBH: None; Attendance: 39,894; Boxscore

=== Game 2 ===
Thursday, October 15, 2026, 6:00 pm (JST) at Mizuho PayPay Dome in Chūō-ku, Fukuoka
Team	1	2	3	4	5	6	7	8	9	R	H	E
Nippon-Ham	2	0	0	0	0	0	0	0	0	2	4	0
SoftBank	0	0	2	0	0	0	0	0	4X	6	8	0
WP: Kazuki Sugiyama (1–0) LP: Ren Fukushima (0–1); Home runs: NIP: None; SBH: Ryōya Kurihara (1); Attendance: 39,894; Boxscore

=== Game 3 ===
Friday, October 16, 2026, 6:00 pm (JST) at Mizuho PayPay Dome in Chūō-ku, Fukuoka
Team	1	2	3	4	5	6	7	8	9	R	H	E
Nippon-Ham	1	0	0	0	1	0	0	0	0	2	8	0
Softbank	0	0	1	0	2	2	1	0	X	6	11	1
WP: Yūgo Maeda (1–0) LP: Takayuki Katoh (0–1); Home runs: NIP: None; SBH: Tomoya Masaki (1); Attendance: 39,894; Boxscore

== Aftermath ==
The Hawks' win qualified them to play in the Japan Series for the third consecutive year, and their 23rd time overall. After Game 3, infielder Yūdai Shōji was named the final stage's most valuable player (MVP) and received a one million yen prize. He finished the series with a .455 batting average (5 for 11), with 2 runs batted in and a 1.091 OPS.
