= Richard Sunagawa =

Japanese baseball player (born 1999)

Richard (Richard Sunagawa)
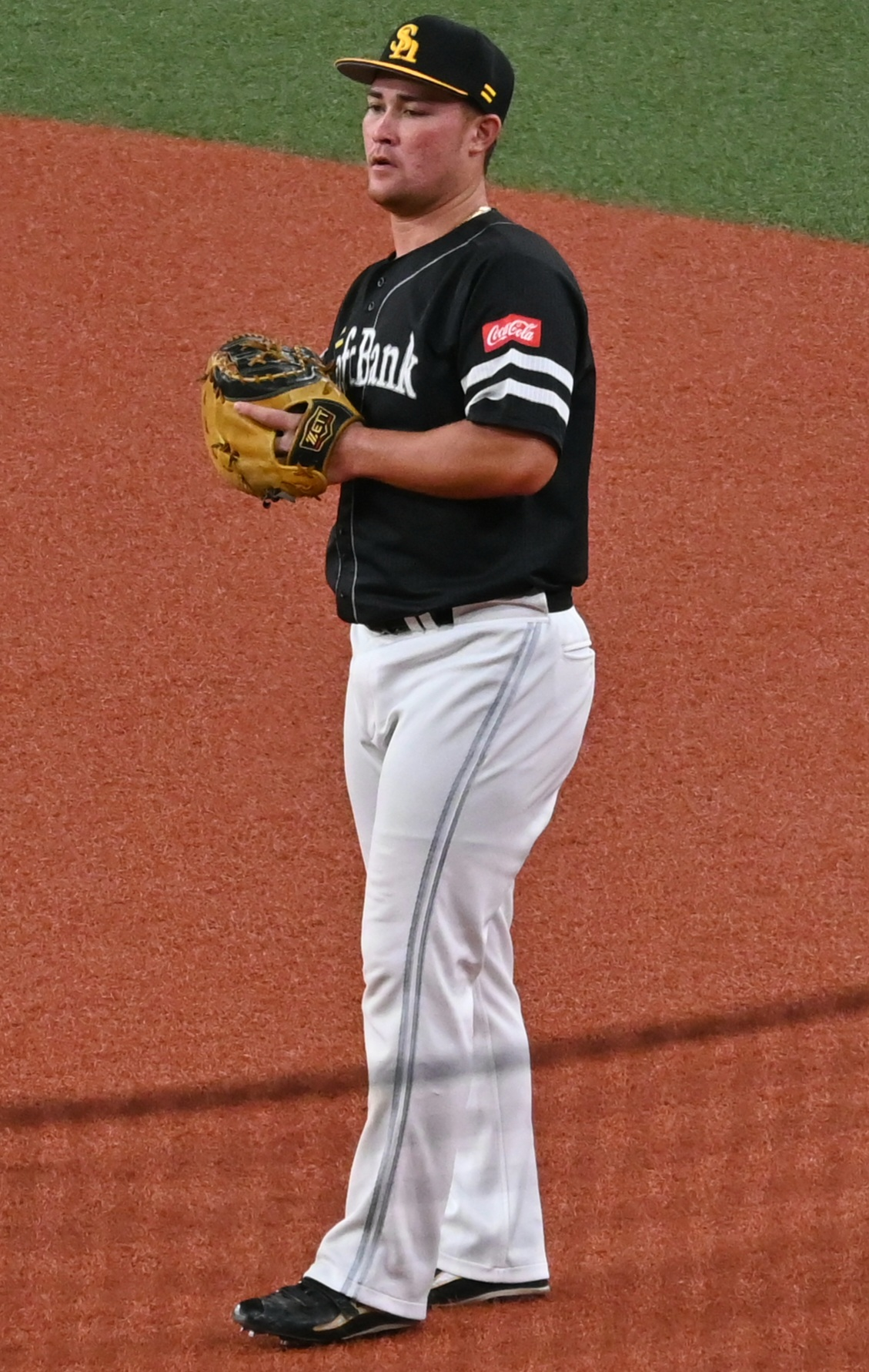
- Richard with the Fukuoka SoftBank Hawks.

Yomiuri Giants – No. 52
- Infielder
- Born: June 18, 1999 (age 26); Kitanakagusuku, Okinawa, Japan
- Bats: Right Throws: Right

NPB debut
- September 2, 2021, for the Fukuoka SoftBank Hawks

NPB statistics (through 2025 season)
- Batting average: .183
- Home runs: 21
- RBI: 66
- Hits: 94
- Stats at Baseball Reference

Teams
- Fukuoka SoftBank Hawks (2018–2025); Yomiuri Giants (2025–present)

Career highlights and awards
- 4× Western League Home run Leader Award (2020-2023); 3× Western League RBI Leader Award (2020,2022,2023); 1× Western League Outstanding Player Award (2020)

Richard Makoto Sunagawa O'Brien (砂川 リチャード オブライエン, Sunagawa Richard O'Brien; born June 18, 1999) also known as Richard Sunagawa (砂川 リチャード, Sunagawa Richard) is a Japanese professional baseball infielder for the Yomiuri Giants of Nippon Professional Baseball (NPB). He has previously played in NPB for the Fukuoka SoftBank Hawks.

In 2022, he set the Western League record for most home runs in a season.

== Professional career ==
=== Fukuoka SoftBank Hawks ===
On October 26, 2017, Richard Sunagawa was drafted as a developmental player by the Fukuoka SoftBank Hawks in the 2017 Nippon Professional Baseball draft.

In the 2018–2019 season, he played in informal matches against the Shikoku Island League Plus's teams and amateur baseball teams, and played in the Western League of NPB's second leagues.

From 2020 season, his register name changed to Richard. On March 16, 2020, Richard re-signed a 6 million yen contract with the Fukuoka SoftBank Hawks as a registered player under control. On December 17, he was honored for the Western League Home Run Leader Award, the Western League RBI Leader Award and the Western League Outstanding Player Award at the NPB Awards 2020.

September 2, 2021, Richard made his first league debut in the Pacific League against the Tohoku Rakuten Golden Eagles. And he recorded his first hit on September 4 against the Orix Buffaloes. He also hit his first homer the next day against the Buffaloes on the 5th with a reverse grand slam and drove in six runs. He finished his debut season with a .181 batting average, seven home runs and 20 runs batted in in 34 games.

In the 2022 season, managers and coaches had high hopes for him to become a solid starting player, but he finished the regular season with a .159 batting average, three home runs, and five runs batted in. On the other hand, in the Western League, he hit 29 home runs, the most in league history.

Richard recorded 15 home runs and 56 RBIs in the Western League, and won the Western League Home run Leader Award for the fourth consecutive year and the Western League RBI Leader Award for the third time in the second consecutive year at the NPB AWARD 2023. However, in the Pacific League, he appeared in 22 games and had a sluggish batting average of .115 with one RBI, and although he had good records in the second league, he has not been able to produce results in the first league.

=== Yomiuri Giants ===
On May 12, 2025, the Hawks traded Richard to the Yomiuri Giants in exchange for Yuto Akihiro and Ryusei Ohe.

== Personal life ==
Richard is of partial American descent and, according to former teammate Carter Stewart, "speaks pretty good English."

He married former HKT48 member Hokazono Hazuki on November 26, 2025.
