= Darwinzon Hernández =

Venezuelan baseball player (born 1996)

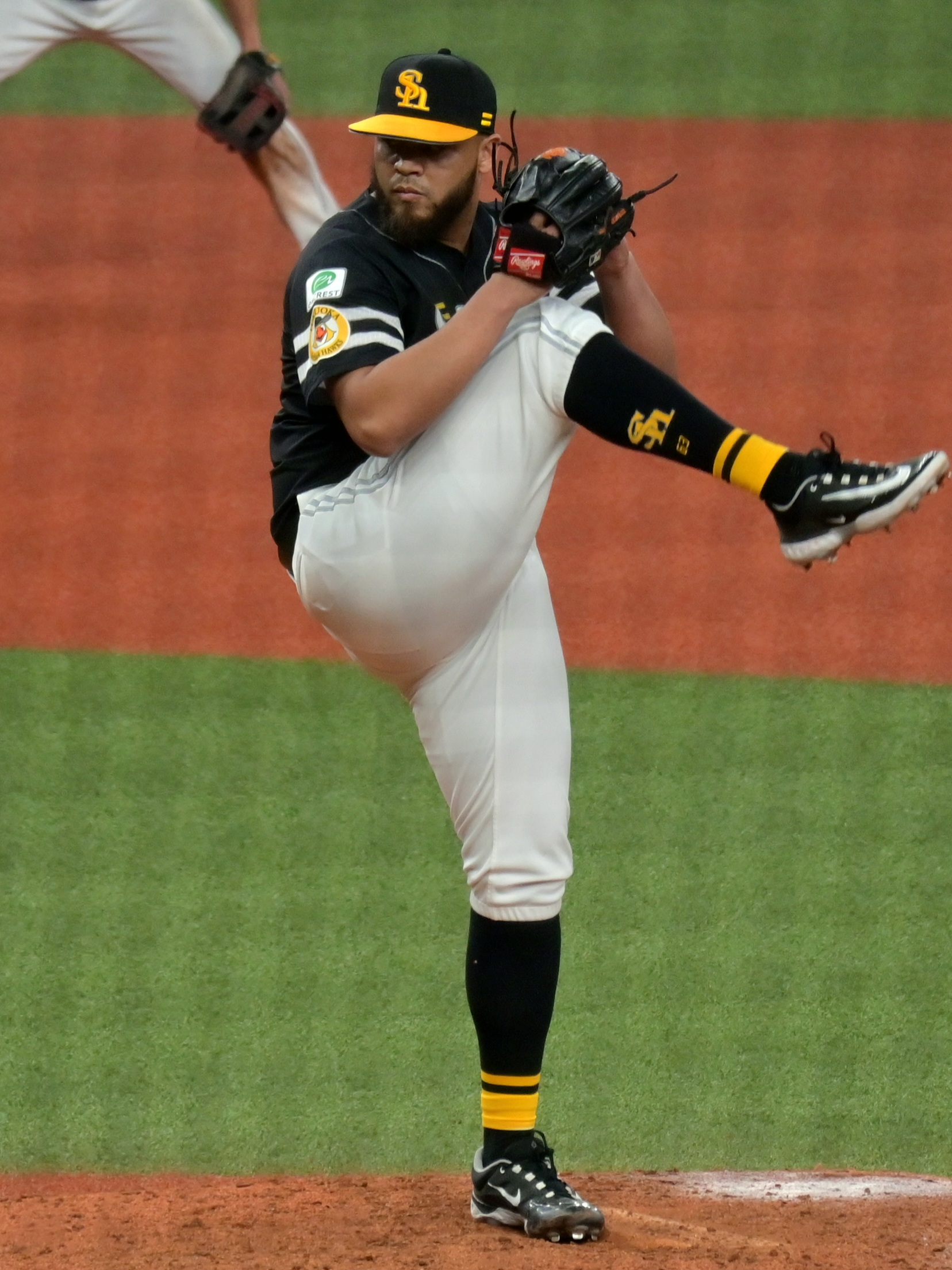
- Hernández with the Fukuoka SoftBank Hawks

Free agent
- Pitcher
- Born: December 17, 1996 (age 29); Ciudad Bolívar, Venezuela
- Bats: Left Throws: Left

Professional debut
- MLB: April 23, 2019, for the Boston Red Sox
- NPB: August 23, 2023, for the Fukuoka SoftBank Hawks

MLB statistics (through 2022 season)
- Win–loss record: 3–4
- Earned run average: 5.06
- Strikeouts: 133

NPB statistics (through 2026 season)
- Win–loss record: 5–7
- Earned run average: 2.46
- Strikeouts: 168
- Stats at Baseball Reference

Teams
- Boston Red Sox (2019–2022); Fukuoka SoftBank Hawks (2023–2026)

Career highlights and awards
- 2× Japan Series champion (2025, 2026)

Darwinzon David Hernández Afanador (born December 17, 1996) is a Venezuelan professional baseball pitcher who is a free agent. He has previously played in Major League Baseball (MLB) for the Boston Red Sox and in Nippon Professional Baseball (NPB) for the Fukuoka SoftBank Hawks. Listed at 6 feet 2 inches (1.88 m) and 245 pounds (111 kg), he bats and throws left-handed.

== Career ==
=== Boston Red Sox ===
Hernández signed with the Boston Red Sox as an international free agent in August 2013. He made his professional debut in 2014 with the Dominican Summer League Red Sox, appearing in 14 games while compiling a record of 1–1 with a 2.89 ERA. In 2015, he again played for the DSL Red Sox, compiling a 6–1 record with 1.10 ERA in 16 appearances. Playing for the Low-A Lowell Spinners in 2016, he had a 3–5 record in 14 games, with a 4.10 ERA. In 2017, Hernández played for the Single-A Greenville Drive, appearing in 23 games while compiling a 4–5 record with a 4.01 ERA.

In 2018, Hernández pitched for the High-A Salem Red Sox and Double-A Portland Sea Dogs, appearing in a total of 28 games while compiling a 9–5 record with 3.35 ERA. After the season, he played in the Arizona Fall League. The Red Sox added Hernández to their 40-man roster after the 2018 season, in order to protect him from the Rule 5 draft.

In 2019, Hernández had a 0.82 ERA with the Red Sox in spring training, second only to Chris Sale, and was optioned to Double-A Portland prior to Opening Day. On April 23, Hernández was added to Boston's major league active roster for the first time, as the 26th man for the second game of a doubleheader. He made his MLB debut that day, pitching 2 1/3 scoreless innings against the Detroit Tigers while striking out four; he was optioned back to Portland following the game. Hernández was briefly recalled to Boston in late May but did not make an appearance. On June 10, the Red Sox announced that Hernández would be recalled to make his first MLB start on June 11, against the Texas Rangers. In that start, Hernández struck out the first four batters he faced, but issued five walks in three innings, while allowing four runs on three hits and taking the loss. He was optioned back to Portland the next day. On June 15, Hernández was promoted to the Triple-A Pawtucket Red Sox, and he was recalled to Boston on July 16. In 29 games (one start) with the 2019 Red Sox, Hernández compiled an 0–1 record with 4.45 ERA and 57 strikeouts in 30 1/3 innings.

On July 4, 2020, it was announced that Hernández had tested positive for COVID-19. During the delayed-start 2020 season, he remained on the injured list until activated on August 20. He was again on the injured list from the end of August until September 18, due to a left AC joint sprain. Overall with the 2020 Red Sox, Hernández appeared in six games (all in relief), compiling a 1–0 record with 2.45 ERA and 11 strikeouts in 7 1/3 innings pitched.

Hernández began the 2021 season as a member of Boston's bullpen. On July 31, he was placed on the injured list due to a right oblique strain. He returned to the team on September 10. Overall during the regular season, Hernández made 48 appearances with Boston, all in relief, compiling a 2–2 record with 3.38 ERA; he struck out 54 batters in 40 innings.

Hernández opened 2022 in Triple-A with the Worcester Red Sox, until suffering a torn right meniscus that required surgery in May. He returned to Worcester in early July, was added to Boston's active roster on July 14, and was optioned back to Worcester on July 26. Hernández was also with Boston for 10 days in the first half of August, and recalled by Boston on October 3 for the final series of the season. In seven relief appearances with Boston during 2022, Hernández posted a 21.60 ERA with 0–1 record while striking out nine batters in 6 2/3 innings.

Hernández was designated for assignment on January 6, 2023, to make room on the team's 40-man roster due to the signing of Justin Turner.

=== Baltimore Orioles ===
On January 11, 2023, Hernández was traded to the Baltimore Orioles in exchange for cash considerations. On January 26, Hernández was designated for assignment by Baltimore following the acquisition of Cole Irvin. On February 2, he cleared waivers and was sent outright to the Triple-A Norfolk Tides. In 27 games for Norfolk, he registered a 2.96 ERA with 37 strikeouts and 1 save in 27 1/3 innings pitched. On July 27, Hernández was released by the Orioles organization.

=== Fukuoka SoftBank Hawks ===
On July 28, 2023, Hernández signed with the Fukuoka SoftBank Hawks of Nippon Professional Baseball (NPB). The signing was made with the intention for Hernández to fill in for the injured Liván Moinelo. On August 23, Hernández pitched against the Chiba Lotte Marines in the Pacific League.

On December 13, 2023, it was announced that Hernández's uniform number would be changed from 61 to 63. He made 48 appearances for the Hawks in 2024, compiling a 3-3 record and 2.25 ERA with 72 strikeouts and three saves over 48 innings of work.

Hernández made 42 appearances for Fukuoka in 2025, logging a 1-2 record and 3.35 ERA with 43 strikeouts across 40 1/3 innings pitched. With the Hawks, Hernández won the 2025 Japan Series.

In 2026, he returned for a fourth season with Fukuoka in which he helped win the 2026 Japan Series. He became a free agent following the 2026 season.
