= Jesús Liranzo (baseball) =

Dominican baseball player (born 1995)

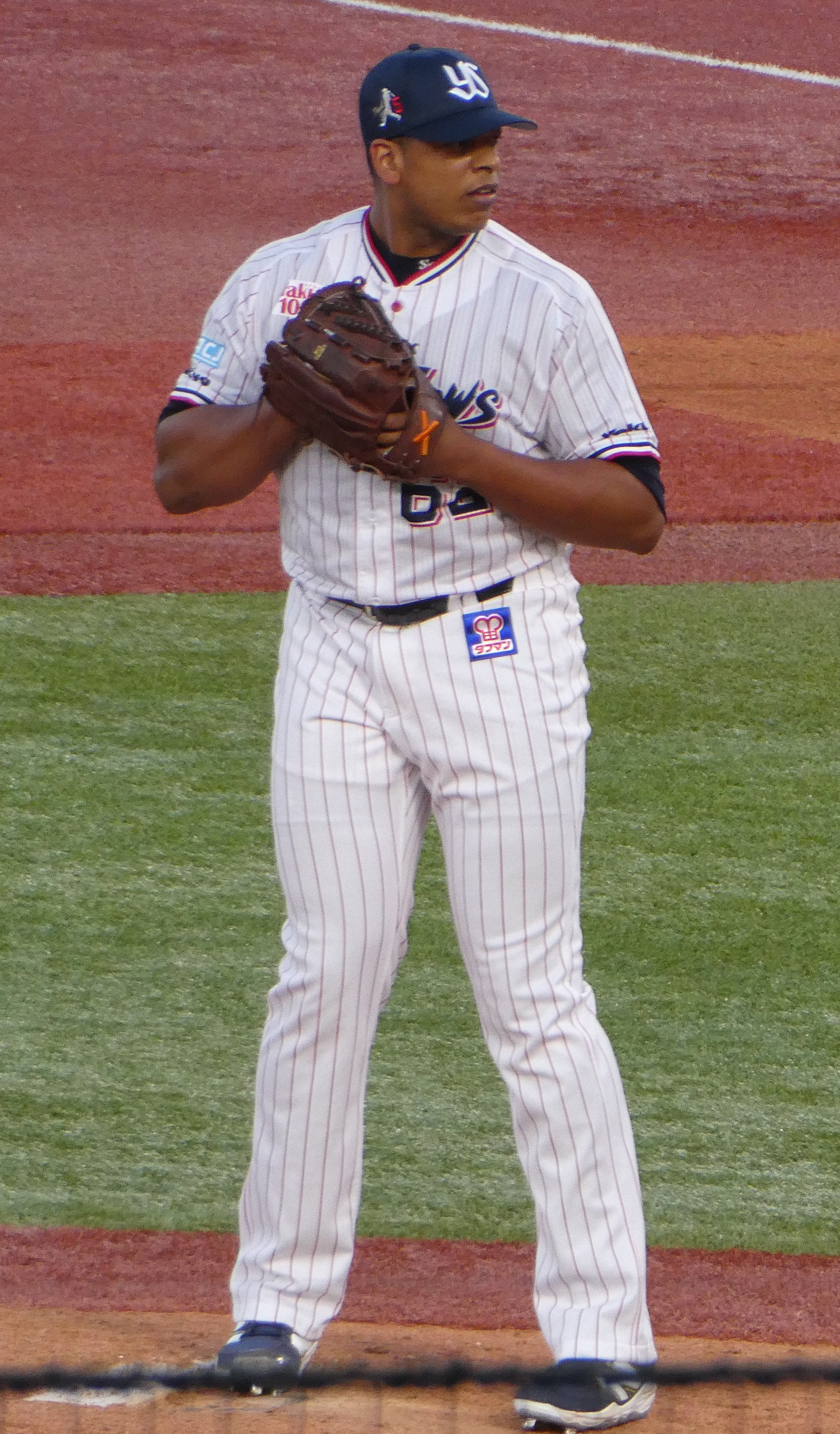
- Liranzo with the Tokyo Yakult Swallows

Tokyo Yakult Swallows – No. 62
- Pitcher
- Born: March 7, 1995 (age 31); La Romana, Dominican Republic
- Bats: Right Throws: Right

NPB debut
- March 28, 2026, for the Tokyo Yakult Swallows

NPB statistics (through August 18, 2026)
- Win–loss record: 2–2
- Earned run average: 1.54
- Strikeouts: 27

Teams
- Tokyo Yakult Swallows (2026–present)

Jesús Manuel Liranzo (born March 7, 1995) is a Dominican professional baseball pitcher for the Tokyo Yakult Swallows of Nippon Professional Baseball (NPB).

== Career ==
=== Atlanta Braves ===
On May 4, 2012, Liranzo signed with the Atlanta Braves as an international free agent. He made his professional debut with the Dominican Summer League Braves. After struggling to an 11.57 ERA in three games for the DSL Braves the following season, Liranzo was released by the Braves organization on June 14, 2013.

=== Baltimore Orioles ===
On July 10, 2013, Liranzo signed a minor league contract with the Baltimore Orioles organization. He made six appearances (two starts) for the Dominican Summer League Orioles, but struggled to an 0–1 record and 8.71 ERA with nine strikeouts across 10 1/3 innings pitched.

Liranzo missed the 2014 season after undergoing Tommy John surgery that included a screw being inserted into his right elbow to repair an Olecranon fracture. He returned to action in 2015 with the DSL Orioles, pitching to a 3–2 record and 2.35 ERA with 46 strikeouts in 38 1/3 innings pitched across 23 relief appearances.

In 2016, Liranzo made 27 appearances split between the Single-A Delmarva Shorebirds and Double-A Bowie Baysox, registering a cumulative 1–1 record and 1.87 ERA with 66 strikeouts over 53 innings of work. On November 18, 2016, the Orioles added Liranzo to their 40-man roster to protect him from the Rule 5 draft.

Liranzo made 31 appearances (12 starts) for Double-A Bowie during the 2017 season, compiling a 3–4 record and 4.85 ERA with 75 strikeouts over 65 innings of work. On March 29, 2018, Liranzo was designated for assignment after the Orioles added multiple players to their Opening Day roster.

=== Pittsburgh Pirates ===
On April 2, 2018, Liranzo was traded to the Los Angeles Dodgers in exchange for Luis Ysla. The next day, Liranzo was designated for assignment following the promotion of Zach Neal. On April 5, Liranzo was claimed off waivers by the Pittsburgh Pirates. He made 41 appearances split between the Double-A Altoona Curve and Triple-A Indianapolis Indians, posting a combined 2–3 record and 3.95 ERA with 65 strikeouts and seven saves over 57 innings of work.

On May 27, 2019, Liranzo was designated for assignment by the Pirates following the acquisition of Yefry Ramírez. He cleared waivers and was sent outright to Indianapolis on June 5. In 42 appearances split between Indianapolis and Altoona, Liranzo accumulated a 2–4 record and 5.03 ERA with 54 strikeouts and two saves over 59 innings of work. He elected free agency following the season on November 4.

On January 1, 2020, Liranzo signed a minor league contract with the San Francisco Giants organization. He did not play in a game in 2020 due to the cancellation of the minor league season because of the COVID-19 pandemic. Liranzo elected free agency on November 2.

=== Arizona Diamondbacks ===
On June 5, 2021, Liranzo signed a minor league contract with the Arizona Diamondbacks organization. He made 16 appearances for the Triple-A Reno Aces, recording a 3.06 ERA with 22 strikeouts and two saves across 17 2/3 innings pitched.

Liranzo made 15 appearances for Reno in 2022, but struggled to an 0–2 record and 8.36 ERA with 22 strikeouts over 14 innings of work; he also made one scoreless appearance for the rookie-level Arizona Complex League Diamondbacks.

=== Detroit Tigers ===
On July 6, 2022, Liranzo was traded to the Detroit Tigers in exchange for future considerations. He made four appearances for the Triple-A Toledo Mud Hens, but struggled to a 17.18 ERA with five strikeouts across 3 2/3 innings pitched. Liranzo was released by the Tigers organization on August 4.

=== Washington Nationals ===
On January 3, 2023, Liranzo signed a minor league contract with the Washington Nationals. He made two appearances for the Triple-A Rochester Red Wings, but struggled to an 0–1 record and 18.00 ERA with three strikeouts over two innings of work. Liranzo was released by the Nationals organization on May 9.

=== Lancaster Barnstormers ===
On June 6, 2023, Liranzo signed with the Lancaster Barnstormers of the Atlantic League of Professional Baseball. Liranzo made eight appearances for the Barnstormers, recording an 0.90 ERA with 18 strikeouts across 10 innings pitched.

=== New York Yankees ===
On June 27, 2023, Liranzo's contract was purchased by the New York Yankees organization. In 20 appearances for the Double-A Somerset Patriots, Liranzo compiled a 3–1 record and 7.09 ERA with 35 strikeouts; he also made six appearances for the Triple-A Scranton/Wilkes-Barre RailRiders, recording a 1.29 ERA with eight strikeouts and one save. Liranzo elected free agency following the season on November 6.

On February 12, 2024, Liranzo re-signed with the Yankees organization on a minor league contract. In 31 appearances (three starts) split between Scranton, Somerset, and the rookie-level Florida Complex League Yankees, he accumulated a 6–3 record and 3.66 ERA with 51 strikeouts and three saves across 39 1/3 innings pitched. Liranzo elected free agency following the season on November 4.

=== Milwaukee Brewers ===
On January 21, 2025, Liranzo signed a minor league contract with the Milwaukee Brewers organization. He made 48 appearances out of the bullpen for the Triple-A Nashville Sounds, posting a 3–4 record and 3.39 ERA with 64 strikeouts and six saves across 58 1/3 innings pitched. Liranzo elected free agency following the season on November 6.

=== Tokyo Yakult Swallows ===
On November 26, 2025, Liranzo agreed to sign with the Tokyo Yakult Swallows of Nippon Professional Baseball.
