= Keisuke Nakata =

Japanese baseball player (born 1999)

- Nakata with the Saitama Seibu Lions.

Saitama Seibu Lions – No. 00
- Infielder
- Born: July 25, 1999 (age 27); Fukuoka, Fukuoka, Japan
- Bats: Both Throws: Right

NPB debut
- April 2, 2024, for the Fukuoka SoftBank Hawks

NPB statistics (through September 29, 2026)
- Batting average: .231
- Hits: 30
- Home runs: 0
- Runs batted in: 6
- Stolen base: 1
- Stats at Baseball Reference

Teams
- Fukuoka SoftBank Hawks (2022–2024); Saitama Seibu Lions (2025–present)

Keisuke Nakata (仲田 慶介, Nakata Keisuke; born July 25, 1999) is a professional Japanese baseball player. He plays infielder for the Saitama Seibu Lions.

== Early baseball career ==
Nakata participated in the 2nd grade spring the 89th Japanese High School Baseball Invitational Tournament as a Center fielder of the Fukuoka University of Ohhori High School with Yūto Koga on 2017.

He went on to Fukuoka University, and won the Best Nine award in the Kyushu Big 6 Baseball League during the spring of his senior year of college.

== Professional career ==
=== Fukuoka SoftBank Hawks ===
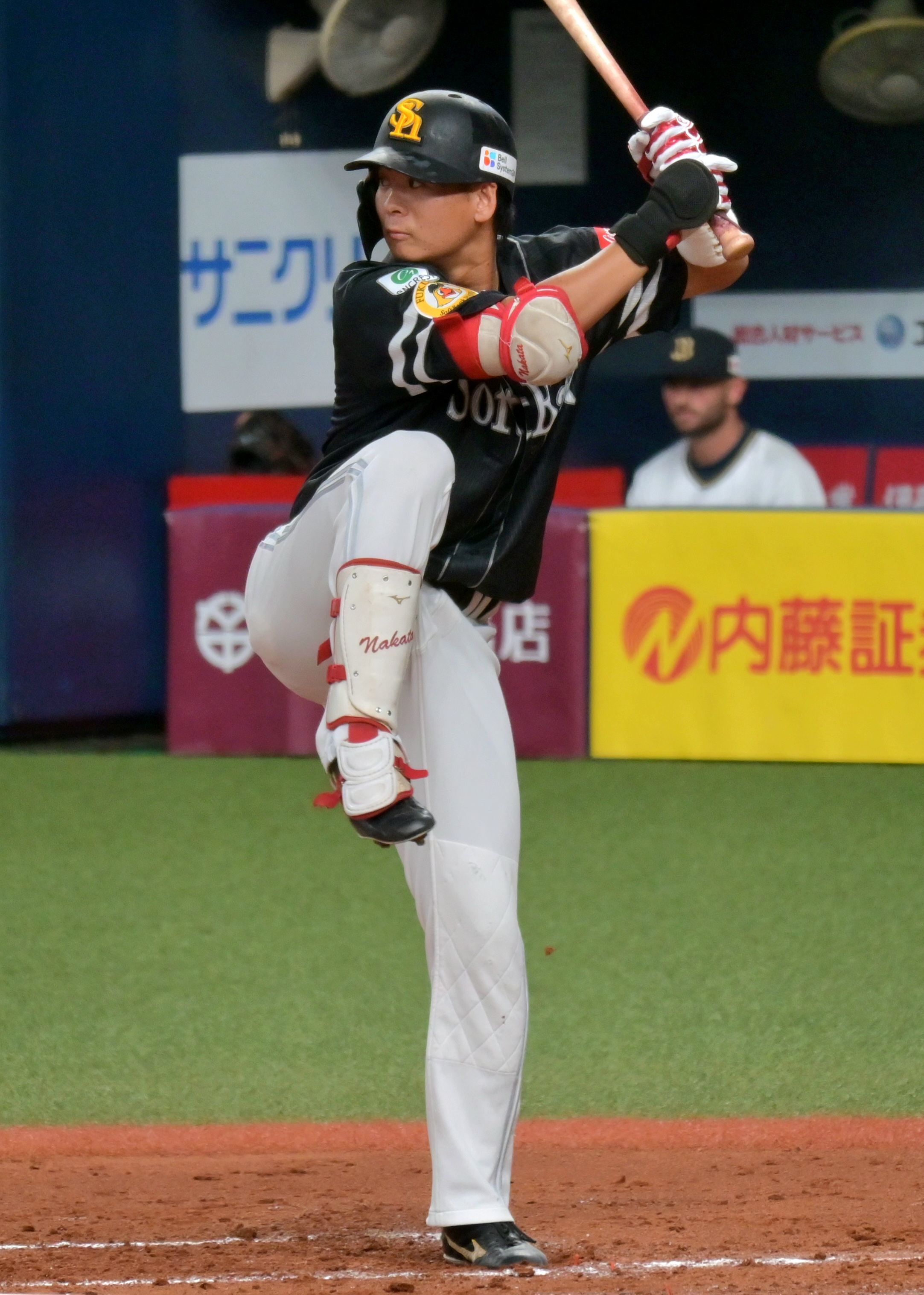
Nakata with the Fukuoka SoftBank Hawks

On October 11, 2021, Nakata was drafted by the Fukuoka SoftBank Hawks as a developmental player in the 2021 Nippon Professional Baseball draft.

From 2022 to 2023 season, he played in informal matches against Shikoku Island League Plus's teams and amateur baseball teams, and played in the Western League of NPB's second leagues.

On March 19, 2024, Nakata signed a 7 million yen re-contract with the Fukuoka SoftBank Hawks as a registered player under control with Yuto Kawamura and Riku Ogata.

In 2024 season, Nakata made his Pacific League debut as a baserunner in the game against the Chiba Lotte Marines on April 2. And recorded his first hit in a game against the Saitama Seibu Lions April 29. However, he was limited to just 24 appearances, having spent the season rehabilitating an inflammation in his lower back. The team offered to re-sign him as a developmental player, but he declined and decided to wait for offers from other teams.

=== Saitama Seibu Lions ===
On November 24, 2024, Nakata signed a contract with the Saitama Seibu Lions as a developmental player.

On March 25, 2025, he re-signed with the team as a registered player under control.

In 2025 season, he suffered a right leg muscle strain on August 10 and was away from the team for a month for treatment, but he appeared in 60 games.
