= Riku Ogata =

Japanese baseball player (born 1998)

- Ogata with the Fukuoka SoftBank Hawks.

Fukuoka SoftBank Hawks – No. 57
- Outfielder
- Born: September 22, 1998 (age 28); Kunitomi, Miyazaki, Japan
- Bats: Left Throws: Right

NPB debut
- March 29, 2024, for the Fukuoka SoftBank Hawks

NPB statistics (through September 30, 2026)
- Batting average: .205
- Hits: 27
- Home runs: 0
- RBI: 10
- Stolen base: 13
- Sacrifice bunt: 5

Teams
- Fukuoka SoftBank Hawks (2021–present)

Career highlights and awards
- Japan Series champion (2025)

Riku Ogata (緒方 理貢, Ogata Riku; born September 22, 1998) is a Japanese professional baseball Outfielder for the Fukuoka SoftBank Hawks of Nippon Professional Baseball (NPB).

== Early baseball career ==
He went on to attend Komazawa University, where he became a regular Left fielder during the autumn of his freshman year. He recorded a batting average of over .300 in the Tohto University Baseball League and contributed to the team's promotion from Division 2 to Division 1.

== Professional career ==
On October 26, 2020, Ogata was drafted by the Fukuoka SoftBank Hawks as a developmental player in the 2020 Nippon Professional Baseball draft.

From 2021 to 2023 season, he played in informal matches against Shikoku Island League Plus's teams and amateur baseball teams, and played in the Western League of NPB's second leagues.

On March 19, 2024, Ogata signed a 7 million yen re-contract with the Fukuoka SoftBank Hawks as a registered player under control with Yuto Kawamura and Keisuke Nakata.

In 2024 season, Ogata made his Pacific League debut as a pinch-runner in the game against the Orix Buffaloes on March 29. And recorded his first hit in a game against the Orix Buffaloes April 20. Although he primarily appeared as a defensive substitute or pinch-runner, he remained on the first-team roster throughout the season, playing in 86 games and contributing to the team's Pacific League championship. And he signing a contract with 13 million yen.

In 2025 season, he played in a career-high 101 games and contributed to the team's Japan Series championship. He also signed a contract worth 24 million yen.

In 2026 season, he injured his right calf muscle after being hit by a pitch on March 27 and spent the season rehabilitating, delaying his addition to the first-team roster until July 10.
