= Ryusei Ohe =

Japanese baseball player (born 1999)

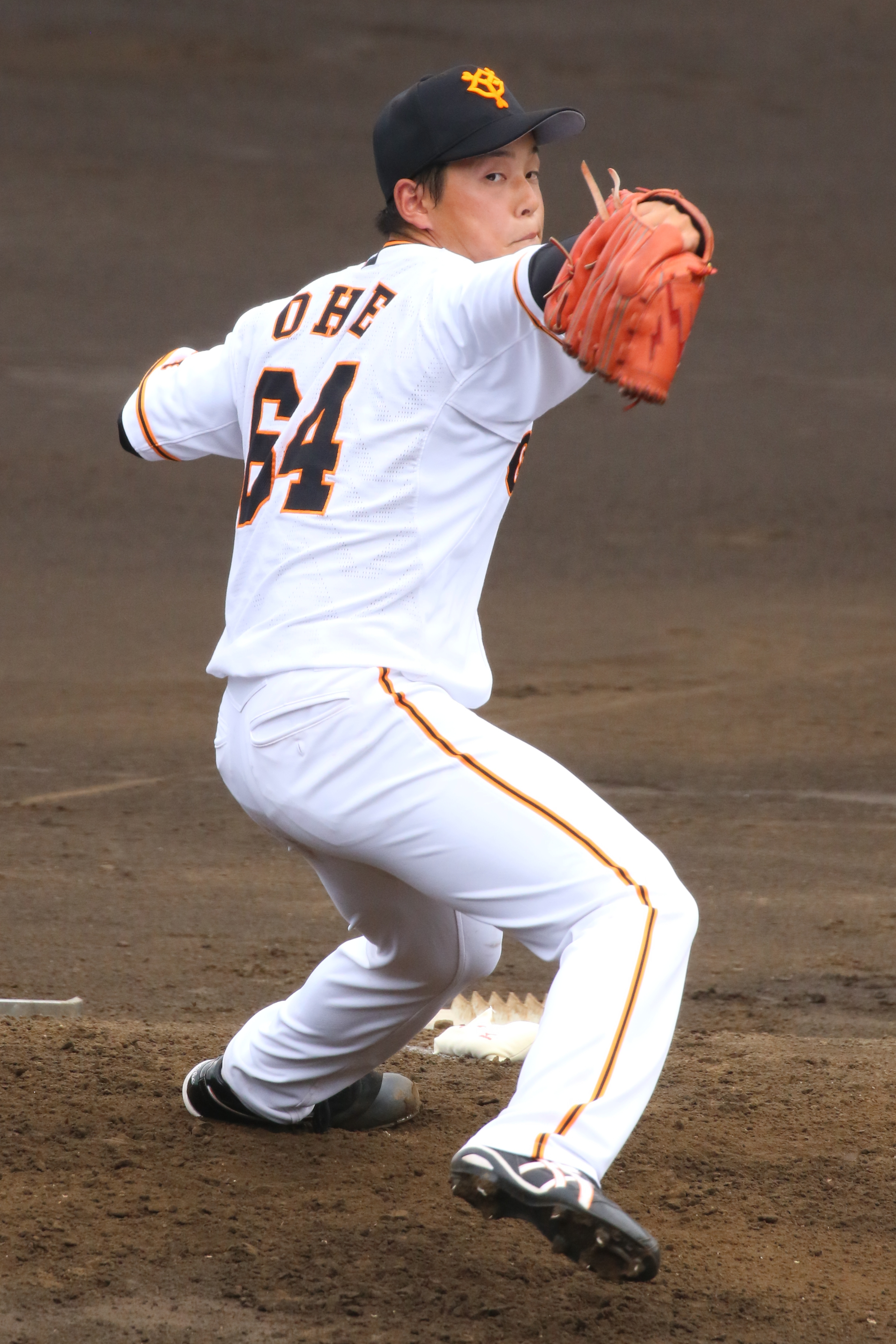
- Ohe with the Yomiuri Giants

Fukuoka SoftBank Hawks – No. 29
- Pitcher
- Born: January 15, 1999 (age 27); Zama, Kanagawa, Japan
- Bats: Left Throws: Left

NPB debut
- March 29, 2019, for the Yomiuri Giants

NPB statistics (through 2024 season)
- Win–loss record: 7–0
- Earned run average: 3.75
- Strikeouts: 94

Teams
- Yomiuri Giants (2019–2025); Fukuoka SoftBank Hawks (2025–present)

Career highlights and awards
- Japan Series champion (2025)

Ryusei Ohe (大江 竜聖, Ohe Ryusei; born January 15, 1999) is a Japanese professional baseball pitcher for the Fukuoka SoftBank Hawks of Nippon Professional Baseball (NPB). He has previously played in NPB for the Yomiuri Giants.

== Career ==
Ohe began his Nippon Professional Baseball career in 2019 with the Yomiuri Giants, and played with the team through the 2025 season.

On 12 May 2025, Ohe and Yuto Akihiro were traded to the Fukuoka SoftBank Hawks in exchange Richard Sunagawa.
