= Shigeru Morikasa =

Japanese baseball player (born 1976)

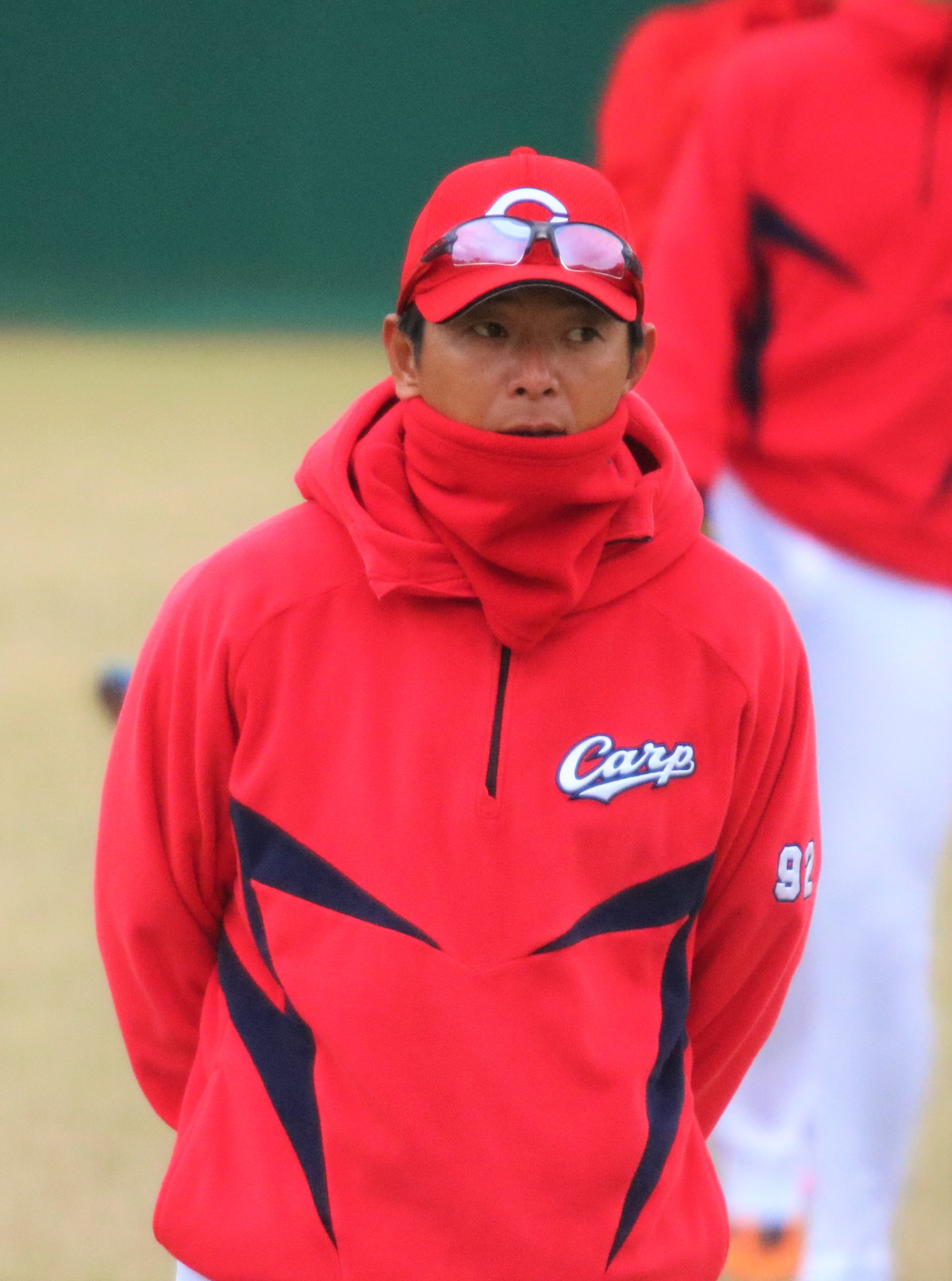
- Morikasa with the Hiroshima Toyo Carp

Fukuoka SoftBank Hawks – No. 013
- Outfielder / Coach
- Born: October 4, 1976 (age 50); Yokosuka, Kanagawa, Japan
- Batted: Left Threw: Right

NPB debut
- May 2, 1999, for the Hiroshima Toyo Carp

Last NPB appearance
- May 18, 2010, for the Yokohama BayStars

NPB statistics
- Batting average: .264
- Home runs: 21
- Run batted in: 125
- Stats at Baseball Reference

Teams
- As player: Hiroshima Toyo Carp (1999–2008); Yokohama BayStars (2009–2010); As coach: Hiroshima Toyo Carp (2011–2022); Fukuoka SoftBank Hawks (2023–present)

Career highlights and awards
- As coach: Japan Series champion (2025)

Shigeru Morikasa (森笠 繁, Morikasa Shigeru; born October 4, 1976) is a Japanese former professional baseball outfielder, and current fourth squad hitting coach for the Fukuoka SoftBank Hawks of Nippon Professional Baseball (NPB). He played as an outfielder in NPB for the Hiroshima Toyo Carp and the Yokohama BayStars.

== Active player era ==
On November 20, 1998, Morikasa was drafted fourth overall by the Hiroshima Toyo Carp in the 1998 Nippon Professional Baseball draft.

In 1999 season, he debuted in the Central League in his rookie year, playing in 29 games.

He was active during the 2003 season, hitting two home runs in one game, and played in 117 games, the most of his career.

He played 10 seasons with the Hiroshima Toyo Carp before moving to the Yokohama BayStars for the 2009 season, where he played two seasons before retiring.

Morikasa has played in 840 games over his 12-season career, batting average .264 with 412 hits, 21 home runs, and 125 RBI.

== After retirement ==
After his retirement, Morikasa was appointed as the Hiroshima Toyo Carp's third squad fielding coach for the 2011 season.

He served as the third squad fielding coach and second squad hitting coach from the 2011 season through the 2022 season.

He serve as the fourth squad hitting coach for the Fukuoka SoftBank Hawks since the 2023 season.
