= Yuto Akihiro =

Japanese baseball player (born 2002)

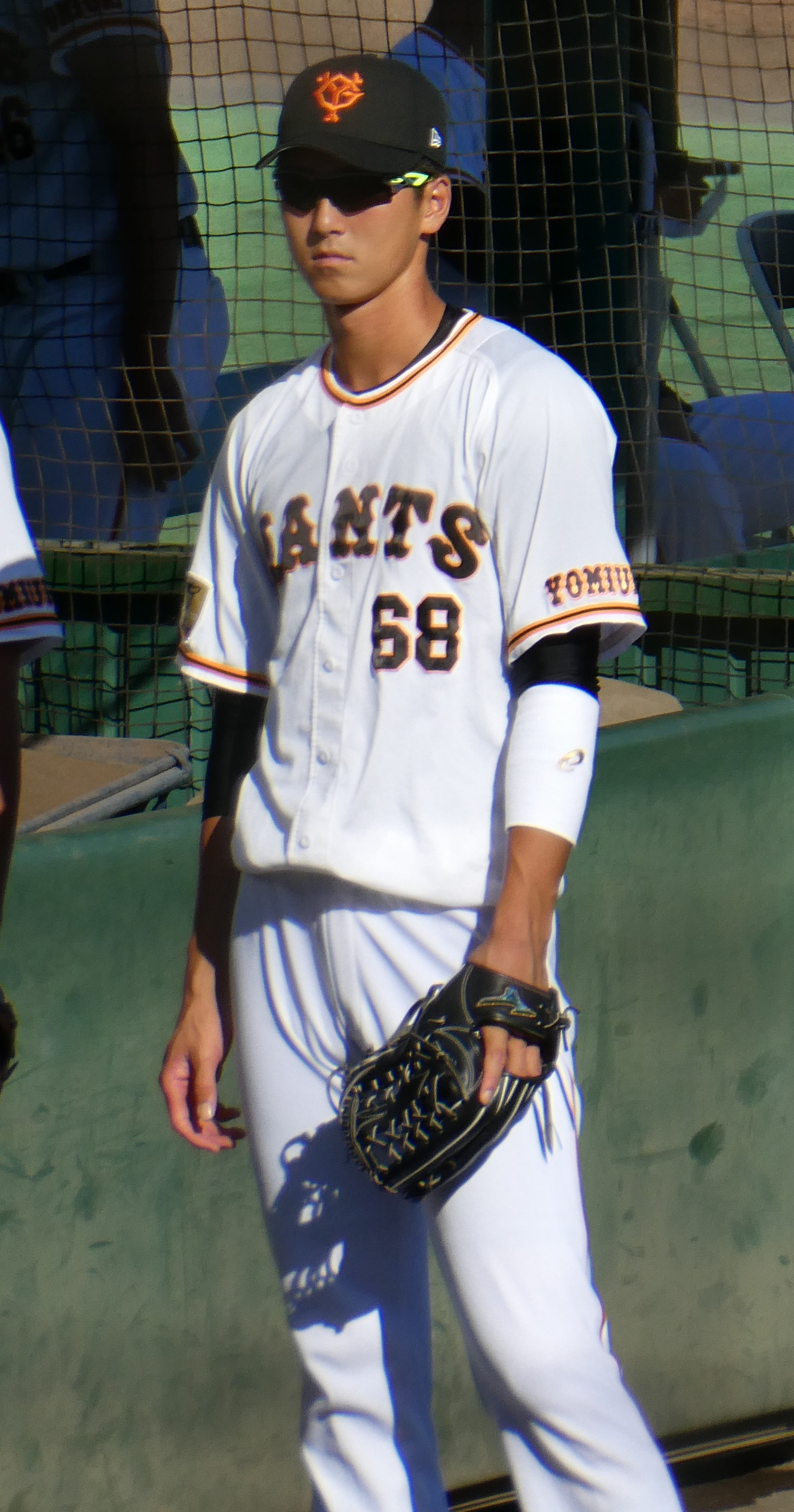
- Akihiro with the Yomiuri Giants

Fukuoka SoftBank Hawks – No. 52
- Outfielder / First baseman
- Born: September 17, 2002 (age 23); Funabashi City, Chiba, Japan
- Bats: Left Throws: Right

NPB debut
- September 29, 2021, for the Yomiuri Giants

NPB statistics (through 2024 season)
- Batting average: .272
- Home runs: 10
- Runs batted in: 42

Teams
- Yomiuri Giants (2021–2025); Fukuoka SoftBank Hawks (2025–present)

Career highlights and awards
- Japan Series champion (2025)

Yuto Akihiro (秋広 優人, Akihiro Yuto; born September 17, 2002) is a Japanese professional baseball first baseman and outfielder for the Fukuoka SoftBank Hawks of Nippon Professional Baseball (NPB). He has previously played in NPB for the Yomiuri Giants.

He stands at 200cm tall, tying him as the tallest player in Japanese baseball history, alongside Kenyu Abe and Shohei "Giant" Baba, both of which are former Giants players.

== Career ==
Akihiro began his Nippon Professional Baseball career with the Yomiuri Giants in 2021, and played with the team through the 2025 season.

On 12 May 2025, Akihiro and Ryusei Ohe were traded to the Fukuoka SoftBank Hawks in exchange for Richard Sunagawa.
