= Alexander Armenta =

Mexican baseball player (born 2004)

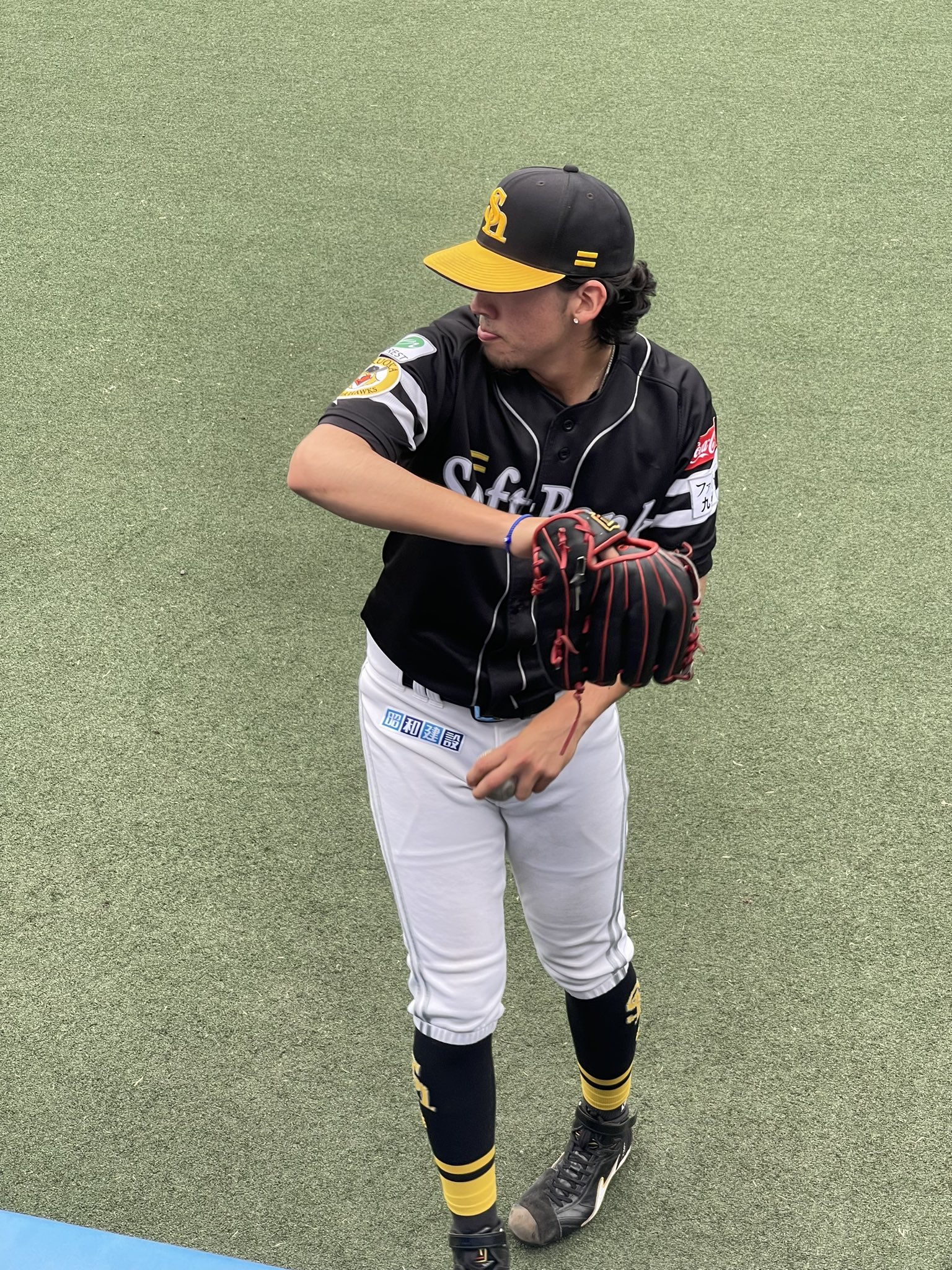
- Armenta with the Fukuoka SoftBank Hawks in 2023

Fukuoka SoftBank Hawks – No. 34
- Pitcher
- Born: 26 June 2004 (age 22); Los Mochis, Sinaloa, Mexico
- Bats: Left Throws: Left

NPB debut
- May 27, 2026, for the Fukuoka SoftBank Hawks

NPB statistics (through 2026 season)
- Win–loss record: 0–2
- Earned run average: 13.50
- Strikeouts: 5
- Stats at Baseball Reference

Teams
- Fukuoka SoftBank Hawks (2026–present)

José Alexander Armenta Castro (born 26 June 2004) is a Mexican professional baseball pitcher for the Fukuoka SoftBank Hawks of Nippon Professional Baseball (NPB). He debuted for the Tigres de Quintana Roo of the Mexican League (LMB) at the age of 16.

== Early life ==
Armenta was born on 26 June 2004 in Los Mochis, Sinaloa, Mexico, the son of Julio César Armenta and Mónica Castro, growing up in the small community of Olas Altas. He began playing baseball in the Liga Teodoro Higuera at age seven. After four seasons, Armenta moved to the Liga de Beisbol de Ahome, where he represented his community of Olas Altas. He also participated in the inaugural season of the Liga de Beisbol Juvenil Mingo Vázquez Márquez in 2021, leading the league with 49 strikeouts.

Armenta represented Olas Altas at the adult level in the Liga de Beisbol Humberto López Pineda.

== Professional career ==
=== Tigres de Quintana Roo ===
At age 15, Armenta signed with the Tigres de Quintana Roo of the Mexican League (LMB). In 2020, he signed with his hometown team, the Cañeros de Los Mochis of the Mexican Pacific League (LMP), as a Primera Firma (lit. 'First Signing') (Note: This mechanism allows each LMP team to protect up to three local youth players before that year's draft.) at the recommendation of a team scout.

Armenta made his professional debut with the Tigres on 23 June 2021, a few days before his 17th birthday, pitching a scoreless inning with one strikeout in a 3–2 in over the Pericos de Puebla. He made a second appearance on 8 July, recording one strikeout over three scoreless innings against the Diablos Rojos del México.

=== Fukuoka SoftBank Hawks ===
On 24 September 2021, it was announced that Armenta would continue his development with the Fukuoka SoftBank Hawks of Nippon Professional Baseball (NPB) after coming a historic agreement with the Tigres. He become the first Mexican League prospect to sign with a Japanese team. Armenta was officially presented by the team in March 2022. He joined their farm team in the Western League of NPB's minor leagues in 2022. In 2025, Armenta posted a 3.47 ERA and 54 strikeouts in 46 2/3 innings pitched.

Armenta made his NPB debut on 27 May 2026, starting against the Yomiuri Giants.

== International career ==
Armenta was selected to play for the Mexico national baseball team at the 2026 World Baseball Classic. He was the youngest player named to the squad. Before joining Team Mexico, Armenta took the mound for the Fukuoka SoftBank Hawks in a friendly game against the Japan national baseball team at Sun Marine Stadium on February 23, recording three strikeouts over two scoreless innings. He later suited up for Mexico in a friendly game against the Arizona Diamondbacks on March 3, giving up one run and striking out Pavin Smith in one inning of work.

Ahead of the tournament, Mexico general manager Rodrigo López called Armenta a "big prospect" and added that he was "going to surprise everyone and be a key player for [the team]."
