= Yūdai Yamamoto =

Japanese baseball player (born 1998)

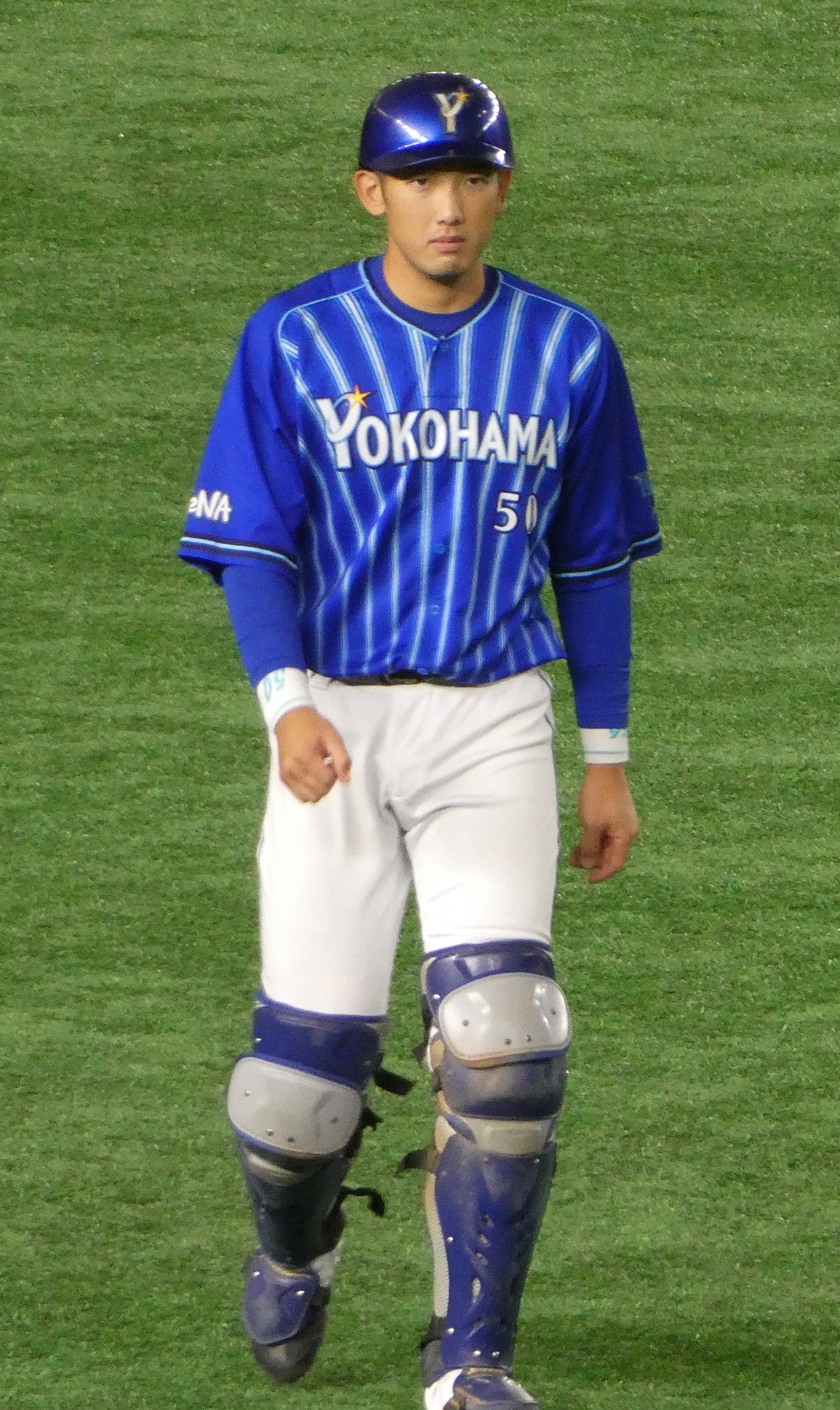
- Yamamoto with the Yokohama DeNA BayStars

Fukuoka SoftBank Hawks – No. 39
- Catcher
- Born: September 11, 1998 (age 28); Osaka, Osaka, Japan
- Bats: Right Throws: Right

NPB debut
- May 25, 2018, for the Yokohama DeNA BayStars

Career statistics (through 2024 season)
- Batting average: .256
- Hits: 173
- Home runs: 10
- RBI: 62

Teams
- Yokohama DeNA BayStars (2018–2026); Fukuoka SoftBank Hawks (2026–)

Career highlights and awards
- 1× NPB All-Star (2024); 1× Central League Best Nine Award (2024); 1× Mitsui Golden Glove Award (2024)

Yūdai Yamamoto (山本 祐大, Yamamoto Yūdai; born April 11, 1998 in Osaka, Osaka, Japan) is a Japanese professional baseball catcher for the Fukuoka SoftBank Hawks of Nippon Professional Baseball (NPB). He previously played for the Yokohama DeNA BayStars.
