= Takashi Sasagawa (baseball) =

Japanese baseball player (born 1979)

Fukuoka SoftBank Hawks – No. 014
- Infielder / Catcher / Coach
- Born: November 8, 1979 (age 45); Shinjuku, Tokyo, Japan
- Batted: Right Threw: Right

NPB debut
- June 1, 2004, for the Fukuoka Daiei Hawks

Last appearance
- July 31, 2005, for the Fukuoka Daiei Hawks

CPBL statistics
- Batting average: .200
- Home runs: 0
- Runs batted in: 0

NPB statistics
- Batting average: .235
- Home runs: 0
- Runs batted in: 0

Teams
- As player: Chinatrust Whales (2003); Fukuoka Daiei Hawks / Fukuoka SoftBank Hawks (2004–2005); As coach: Fukuoka SoftBank Hawks (2011–2013, 2017–present)

Career highlights and awards
- As coach: Japan Series champion (2025)

Takashi Sasagawa (笹川 隆, Sasagawa Takashi; born November 8, 1979) is a Japanese former professional baseball infielder, catcher, and current fourth squad infield defense and base running coach for the Fukuoka SoftBank Hawks of Nippon Professional Baseball (NPB). He played in NPB for the Hawks, and in the Chinese Professional Baseball League for the Chinatrust Whales.

== Professional career ==
=== Active player era ===
On November 21, 1997, Sasagawa was drafted 6th overall by the Fukuoka Daiei Hawks in the 1997 Nippon Professional Baseball draft.

In 1998-2022 season, he played in the Western League of NPB's second league.

In 2003 season, Sasagawa traded for Chen Wen-bin of the Chinatrust Whales of the CPBL at the deadline. And he played in eight games and batting average .200.

In 2004 season, he returned to the Hawks to make his Pacific League debut.

He was a member of the Hawks for eight seasons, with a total of 23 games played, a .235 batting average, four hits. He retired during the 2005 season.

=== After retirement ===
After his retirement, Sasagawa had been a scout for the Fukuoka SoftBank Hawks since the 2006 season, acquiring players such as Yuya Hasegawa.

He served as the third squad infield and base coach from the 2011 season through 2013.

From the 2014 season through the 2016 season he served as the dormitory manager and farm team assistant staff for the Hawks players' dormitory.

He was again named the third squad infield and base coach for the 2017 season, then the second squad infield defensive base coach for the 2021 season, and the third squad infield defense and base running coach for the 2022 season.

He serve as the fourth squad infield defense and base running coach beginning with the 2023 season.
