= Yuto Kawamura =

Japanese baseball player (born 1999)

- Kawamura with the Fukuoka SoftBank Hawks.

Fukuoka SoftBank Hawks – No. 61
- Outfielder
- Born: August 13, 1999 (age 27); Matsumae, Hokkaido, Japan
- Bats: Left Throws: Right

NPB debut
- April 4, 2024, for the Fukuoka SoftBank Hawks

NPB statistics (through 2026 season)
- Batting average: .218
- Hits: 38
- Home runs: 1
- RBI: 15
- Stolen base: 5
- Sacrifice bunt: 4

Teams
- Fukuoka SoftBank Hawks (2022–present)

Career highlights and awards
- Japan Series champion (2025)

Yuto Kawamura (川村 友斗, Kawamura Yūto; born August 13, 1999) is a Japanese professional baseball Outfielder for the Fukuoka SoftBank Hawks of Nippon Professional Baseball (NPB).

== Early baseball career ==
Kawamura participated in the 2nd grade summer the 98th Japanese High School Baseball Championship as a First baseman of the Hokkai High School with Kosuke Sakaguchi on 2016.

He went on to Sendai University, and led the league in batting average and RBIs during his sophomore autumn season, and in home runs and RBIs during his junior autumn season In the Sendai Big-Six Universities Baseball League.

== Professional career ==
On October 11, 2021, Kawamura was drafted by the Fukuoka SoftBank Hawks as a developmental player in the 2021 Nippon Professional Baseball draft.

From 2022 to 2023 season, he played in informal matches against Shikoku Island League Plus's teams and amateur baseball teams, and played in the Western League of NPB's second leagues.

On March 19, 2024, Kawamura signed a 7 million yen re-contract with the Fukuoka SoftBank Hawks as a registered player under control with Riku Ogata and Keisuke Nakata.

In 2024 season, Kawamura made his Pacific League debut as a baserunner in the game against the Chiba Lotte Marines on April 4. He also recorded his first hit and RBI in a game against the Tohoku Rakuten Golden Eagles April 6. And he played in 88 games, recording a .268 batting average, one home run, and 14 RBIs, and finished the season by signing a contract worth 20.5 million yen.

In 2025 season, Kawamura fractured his right hand in May and spent the season undergoing surgery and rehabilitation, limiting him to just 15 appearances.

In 2026 season, Kawamura contributed to the team by appearing in a career-high 103 games, primarily serving as a late-game defensive sub or a pinch-runner.
