= Carter Stewart =

American baseball player (born 1999)

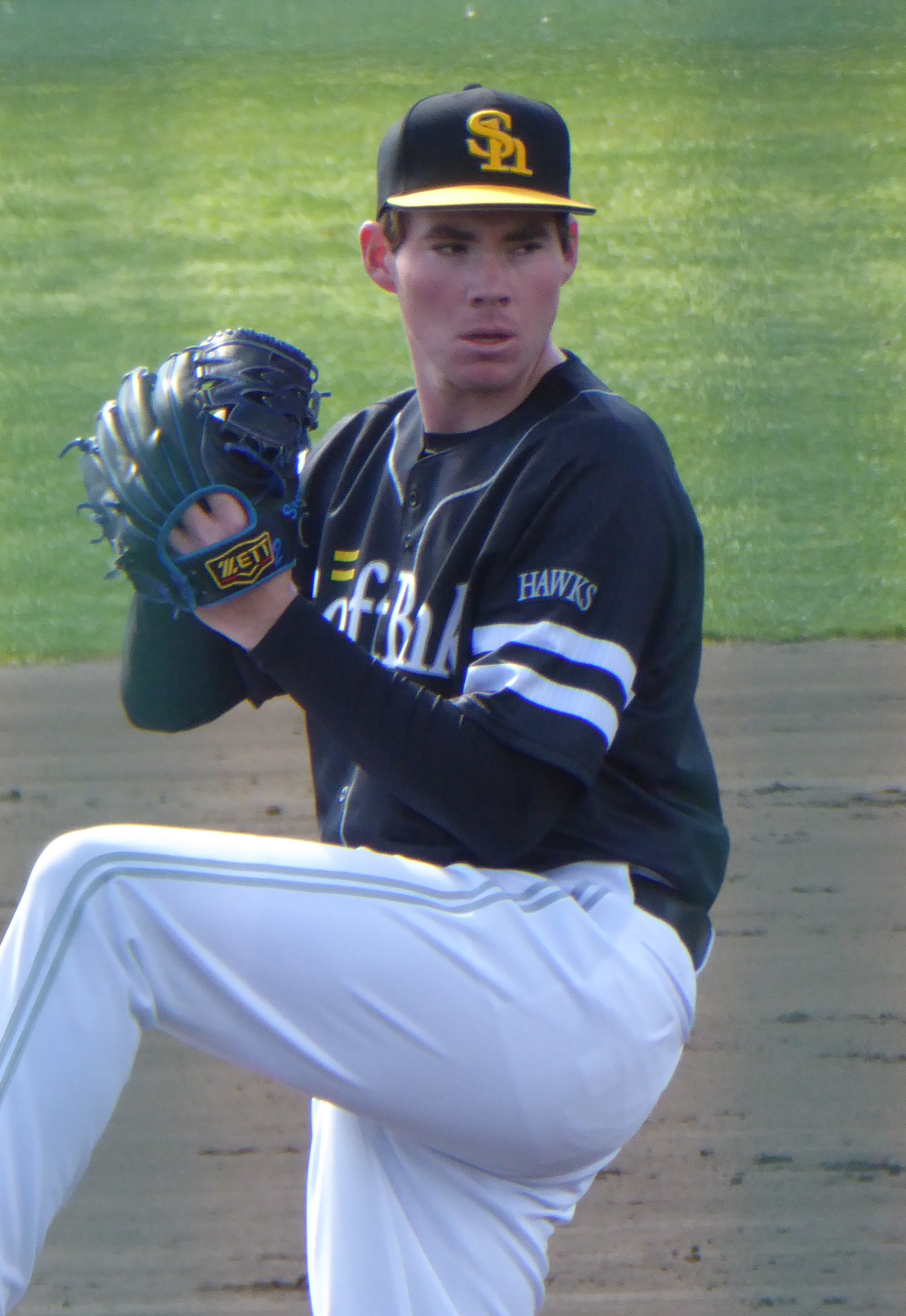
- Stewart Jr. with the Fukuoka SoftBank Hawks

Free agent
- Pitcher
- Born: November 2, 1999 (age 27); Melbourne, Florida, U.S.
- Bats: Right Throws: Right

NPB debut
- April 17, 2021, for the Fukuoka SoftBank Hawks

NPB statistics (through 2026 season)
- Win–loss record: 18–17
- Earned run average: 3.41
- Strikeouts: 265
- Stats at Baseball Reference

Teams
- Fukuoka SoftBank Hawks (2021, 2023–2024, 2026)

Career highlights and awards
- 2x Japan Series champion (2025, 2026)

Scott Carter Stewart Jr. (born November 2, 1999) is an American professional baseball pitcher who is a free agent.

== Early career ==
Stewart attended and graduated from Eau Gallie High School in Eau Gallie, Florida. As a junior in 2017, he went 11–2 with a 0.81 earned run average (ERA) and 104 strikeouts. During the summer of 2017, he played in the Perfect Game All-American Classic at Petco Park. As a senior in 2018, he was named the Gatorade Baseball Player of the Year for Florida after going 6–2 with a 0.91 ERA and 128 strikeouts. He committed to play college baseball at Mississippi State University.

Stewart was considered one of the top prospects for the 2018 Major League Baseball draft, and was drafted by the Atlanta Braves with the eighth overall pick. Due to a wrist injury, Atlanta offered a signing bonus below the full value of the draft slot, and Stewart did not sign with the Braves.

Stewart enrolled at Eastern Florida State College (EFSC) for the 2018–19 academic year in order to be eligible for selection in the 2019 Major League Baseball draft. With the EFSC Titans, who compete in the National Junior College Athletic Association (NJCAA), Stewart made 13 starts, compiling a 2–2 record with 1.70 ERA and 108 strikeouts.

== Professional career ==
=== Fukuoka SoftBank Hawks ===
On May 21, 2019, sports website The Athletic reported that Stewart agreed to contract terms with the Fukuoka SoftBank Hawks of Nippon Professional Baseball (NPB). On May 30, the Hawks officially announced that Stewart had agreed to and signed a six-year contract that guarantees him as much as $7 million.

In the 2019 and 2020 seasons, Stewart pitched in the Western League of NPB's minor leagues and also in unofficial games against Shikoku Island League Plus's teams.

On April 17, 2021, Stewart made his NPB debut in the ninth inning of a game against the Saitama Seibu Lions. He struck out two batters, walked one, and his fastball was measured at 94 miles per hour. In 2022, Stewart didn't get a chance to pitch for the Hawks in the Pacific League and spent the season with their farm team in the Western League.

On July 26, 2023, Stewart earned his first NPB win after tossing six scoreless innings in a 7–1 victory over the Orix Buffaloes. In 2023, he appeared in 14 games for the Hawks, posting a 3–6 win–loss record, 3.38 ERA, and 67 strikeouts across 77 1/3 innings. Stewart also pitched as a starter in Game 1 of the first stage of the 2023 Pacific League Climax Series.

On December 15, 2023, Stewart signed a two–year, $10 million contract extension with the Hawks. Stewart made 20 appearances for Fukuoka during the 2024 campaign, compiling a 9-4 record and 1.95 ERA with 105 strikeouts over 120 innings of work.

Stewart missed the start of the 2025 season with a left abdominal muscle strain. He did not appear for the team during the regular season, but won the 2025 Japan Series with the club. In 2026 he won his second straight Japan Series and became a free agent following the season.
