= Haru Matsumoto =

Japanese baseball player (born 2001)

Fukuoka SoftBank Hawks – No. 49
- Pitcher
- Born: February 24, 2001 (age 25); Nishi-ku, Osaka, Osaka, Japan
- Bats: Left Throws: Left

NPB debut
- June 10, 2023, for the Fukuoka SoftBank Hawks

NPB statistics (through 2025 season)
- Win–loss record: 8–8
- Earned run average: 3.01
- Strikeouts: 113

Teams
- Fukuoka SoftBank Hawks (2023–present)

Career highlights and awards
- Japan Series champion (2025)

Haru Matsumoto (松本 晴, Matsumoto Haru; born February 24, 2001) is a Japanese professional baseball pitcher for the Fukuoka SoftBank Hawks of Nippon Professional Baseball (NPB).

== Early baseball career ==
Matsumoto went on to Asia University, although he suffered from injuries such as Tommy John surgery in his third year, he won the 2022 Japan National Collegiate Baseball Championship in his fourth year.

== Professional career ==
On October 20, 2022, Matsumoto was drafted fifth-round pick by the Fukuoka SoftBank Hawks in the 2022 Nippon Professional Baseball draft.

On June 10, 2023, Matsumoto pitched his debut game in the interleague play against the Yomiuri Giants as a relief pitcher.

In 2023 season, he pitched 3 games.
