= Liván Moinelo =

Cuban baseball player (born 1995)

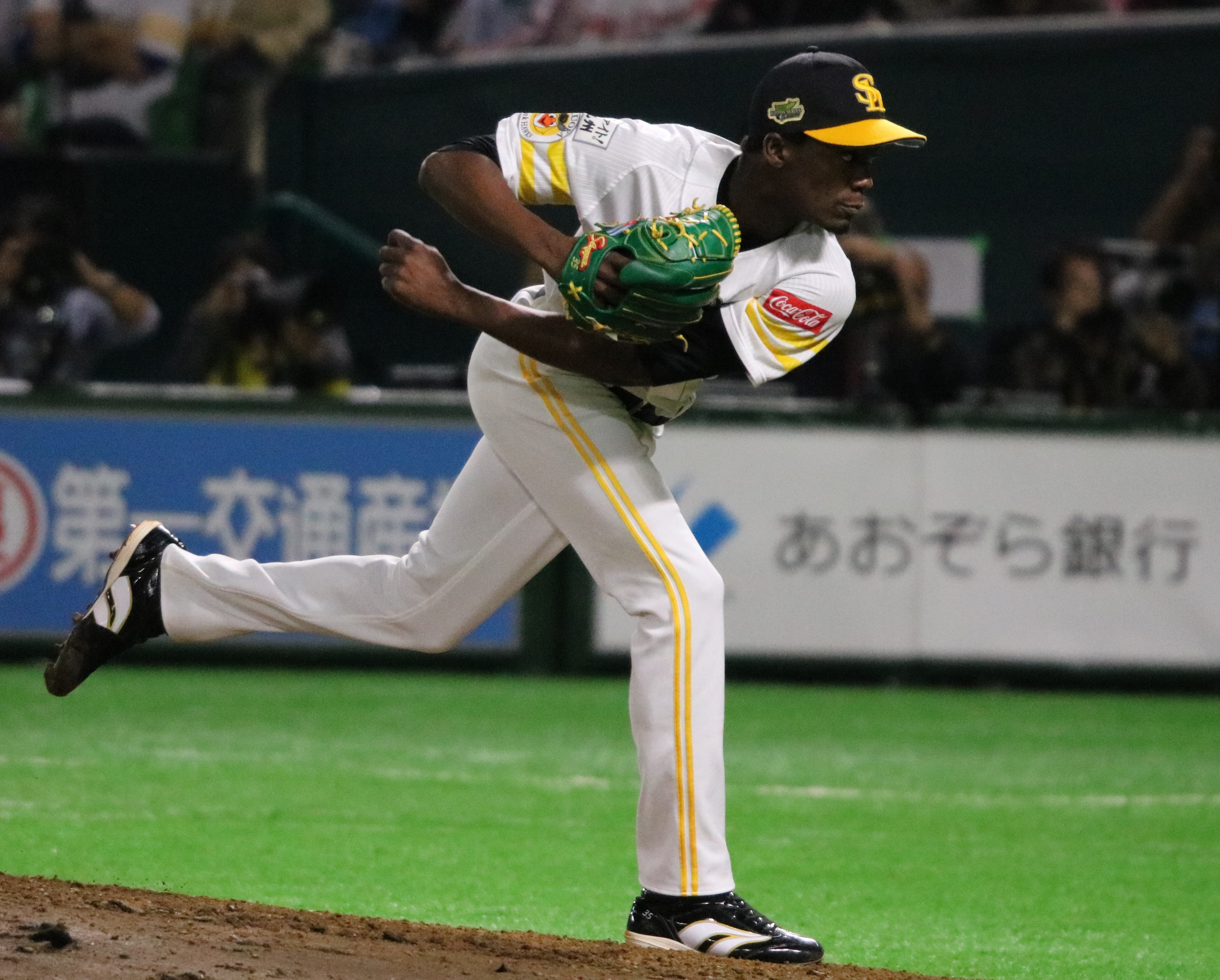
- Moinelo with the Fukuoka SoftBank Hawks

Fukuoka SoftBank Hawks – No. 35
- Pitcher
- Born: December 8, 1995 (age 30); Pinar del Rio, Cuba
- Bats: Left Throws: Left

NPB debut
- June 27, 2017, for the Fukuoka SoftBank Hawks

NPB statistics (through August 21, 2026)
- Win–loss record: 44–17
- Earned run average: 1.78
- Strikeouts: 761
- Saves: 40
- Stats at Baseball Reference

Teams
- Fukuoka SoftBank Hawks (2017–present)

Career highlights and awards
- Pacific League MVP (2025); Pacific League Best Relief Pitcher Award (2020); Pacific League hold leader (2020); 2× Pacific League ERA leader (2024, 2025); Pacific League Best Nine Award (2025); Pacific League Golden Glove Award (2024); 6× Japan Series champion (2017–2020, 2025, 2026); 2× NPB All-Star (2022, 2025)
Medals
Men's baseball
Representing Cuba
Pan American Games
Bronze medal – third place	2015 Toronto	Team

Liván Moinelo Pita (born December 8, 1995) is a Cuban professional baseball pitcher for the Fukuoka SoftBank Hawks of Nippon Professional Baseball (NPB).

== Career ==
Moinelo played for the Cuban national baseball team at the 2015 Pan American Games, 2015 Premier 12 and 2017 World Baseball Classic.

=== Fukuoka SoftBank Hawks ===
==== 2017–2020 ====
On May 10, 2017, the Government of Cuba signed a contract to dispatch Moinelo and Oscar Colas to the Fukuoka SoftBank Hawks as a developmental player. From May 28, 2017, he played on the Western League, one of the two minor league teams in the NPB. On June 16 of the same year, Moinelo signed a 20 million yen contract with the Fukuoka SoftBank Hawks as a registered player under control. On June 27, he pitched his debut game against the Hokkaido Nippon-Ham Fighters as a relief pitcher. On July 2, he won a game as a relief pitcher for the first time in the Pacific League. In 2017 season, he finished the regular season as a Setup man with 34 games pitched, a 4–3 Win–loss record, a 2.52 ERA, 15 holds, 1 save, and 36 strikeouts in 35 2/3 innings. He pitched as a setup man in the postseason, and he pitched well in the 2017 Pacific League Climax Series against Tohoku Rakuten Golden Eagles and the 2017 Japan Series against Yokohama DeNA BayStars, and contributed to the Hawks' Japan Series championship victory.

In the 2018 season, Moinelo finished the regular season with 49 games pitched, a 5–1 Win–loss record, a 4.53 ERA, 13 holds, 1 save, and 57 strikeouts in 45 2/3 innings. And in the postseason, he pitched as a setup man in the 2018 Pacific League Climax Series against Saitama Seibu Lions and the 2018 Japan Series against Hiroshima Toyo Carp, and contributed to the team's second consecutive Japan Series championship.

In the 2019 season, Moinelo finished the regular season with 60 Games pitched, a 3–1 Win–loss record, a 1.52 ERA, 34 holds, 4 saves, and 86 strikeouts in 59 1/3 innings. And in the postseason, he pitched as a setup man in the 2019 Pacific League Climax Series against Saitama Seibu Lions and the 2019 Japan Series against Yomiuri Giants, and contributed to the team's third consecutive Japan Series championship. On October 8, he was selected by the Cuba national baseball team for 2019 WBSC Premier12.

In the 2020 season, Moinelo finished the regular season with 50 Games pitched, a 2–3 Win–loss record, a 1.69 ERA, a 38 Holds (League Holds leader), a one Save, a 77 strikeouts in 48 innings. And he recorded his career high with K9 (14.44) and AVG (.164). In the 2020 Japan Series against the Yomiuri Giants, He pitched in three games as a Setup man, scoring no hits, no runs and 8 strikeouts, contributing to the team's fourth consecutive Japan Series champion. On December 17, Moinelo was honored for the Pacific League Best Relief Pitcher Award at the NPB AWARD 2020.

==== 2021–present ====
In 2021, Moinelo finished the regular season having made 33 appearances and compiling a 1–0 record and 1.15 ERA, with 5 saves and 42 strikeouts across 31 1/3 innings pitched.

On January 27, 2022, Moinelo re-signed a three–year contract with the Hawks for an annual salary of 300 million yen. Moinelo made 53 appearances for the Hawks in 2022, registering a 1–1 record and 1.03 ERA with 24 saves and 87 strikeouts over 52 2/3 innings of work.

Moinelo was excellent for SoftBank to begin the 2023 season, recording an 0.98 ERA with 37 strikeouts and 5 saves in 27 2/3 innings across 27 appearances. After being diagnosed with arthritis in his left elbow, it was announced on July 16, 2023 that he would undergo a cleanup procedure on the same elbow and miss approximately three months.

On March 26, 2024, it was announced that Moinelo had agreed to a four–year, $26.4 million contract extension with Fukuoka. Moinelo also transitioned into a starting pitcher role for 2024, starting his first game on March 30, against the 3 time defending pennant winning Orix Buffaloes, where he gave up only 3 hits, 2 earned runs, and 1 walk in an 8 inning, 90 pitch losing effort. He earned his first win as a starter on April 13 against the Saitama Seibu Lions, only giving up 3 hits in 8 innings of work as the Hawks won 11-2. Moinelo also picked up his first hit during the 2024 season during Interleague play at Yokohama Stadium against the Yokohama DeNA BayStars. Moinelo picked up the Pacific League ERA title in his first season as a starter with a 1.88 ERA, 155 strikeouts and an 11–5 record in 163 innings pitched.

On June 6, 2025, Moinelo set a team record after striking out 18 batters against the Tokyo Yakult Swallows; the previous record was 16 by Shota Oba in 2008. He made 24 appearances for Fukuoka, posting a 12-3 record and 1.46 ERA with 172 strikeouts over 167 innings of work. With the Hawks, Moinelo won the 2025 Japan Series and became the first Cuban to win MVP in NPB history.
