= Kazuki Sugiyama =

Japanese baseball player (born 1997)

Fukuoka SoftBank Hawks – No. 40
- Pitcher
- Born: December 7, 1997 (age 28); Shizuoka, Shizuoka, Japan
- Bats: Right Throws: Right

NPB debut
- September 7, 2019, for the Fukuoka SoftBank Hawks

NPB statistics (through 2025 season)
- Win–loss record: 10–9
- Earned run average: 3.15
- Strikeouts: 238
- Stats at Baseball Reference

Teams
- Fukuoka SoftBank Hawks (2019–present)

Career highlights and awards
- NPB All-Star (2025); Japan Series champion (2025)

Kazuki Sugiyama (杉山 一樹, Sugiyama Kazuki; born December 7, 1997) is a Japanese professional baseball pitcher for the Fukuoka SoftBank Hawks of Nippon Professional Baseball (NPB).

== Professional career ==
On October 25, 2015, Sugiyama was drafted by the Fukuoka SoftBank Hawks in the 2018 Nippon Professional Baseball draft.

In 2019 season, Sugiyama hurt his right ankle during spring training. On September 7, he debuted in the Pacific League against the Chiba Lotte Marines as a relief pitcher. Sugiyama pitched two games in the Pacific League.

In the match against the Tohoku Rakuten Golden Eagles on July 8, 2020, Sugiyama recorded his fastest 157 km/h (97.58 mph) fastball. In 2020 season, he finished the regular season with a 11 Games pitched, a 0–0 Win–loss record, a 2.16 ERA, a one Hold, a 22 strikeouts in 16.2 innings. In the 2020 Japan Series against the Yomiuri Giants, Sugiyama pitched as a relief pitcher in Game 2 and contributed to the team's fourth consecutive Japan Series championship with no runs in one inning.

On April 7, 2021, Sugiyama recorded his first win against the Hokkaido Nippon-Ham Fighters as a relief pitcher. In 2021 season, he finished the regular season with 15 Games pitched, a 2–2 Win–loss record, a 3.20 ERA, a one Holds and a 29 strikeouts in 25.1 innings.

On May 8, 2022, he earned his first win as a starting pitcher against the Chiba Lotte Marines. In 2022 season, he finished the regular season with 10 Games pitched, a 1–3 Win–loss record, a 6.80 ERA, and a 37 strikeouts in 42.1 innings.

In 2023 season, Sugiyama injured a ligament in his right elbow during spring training. As a result, he spent the season undergoing rehabilitation and did not have a chance to pitch in the first league.
