= Yudai Shoji =

Japanese baseball player (born2002)

Fukuoka SoftBank Hawks – No. 25
- Infielder
- Born: October 2, 2002 (age 24); Yokohama, Kanagawa, Japan
- Bats: Left Throws: Right

NPB debut
- May 5, 2025, for the Fukuoka SoftBank Hawks

NPB statistics (through 2026 season)
- Batting average: .246
- Home runs: 1
- RBI: 28
- Hits: 66
- Stolen base: 22
- Sacrifice bunt: 11

Teams
- Fukuoka SoftBank Hawks (2025–present)

Career highlights and awards
- Japan Series champion (2025)

Yudai Shoji (庄子 雄大, Shōji Yūdai; born October 2, 2002) is a Japanese professional baseball Infielder for the Fukuoka SoftBank Hawks of Nippon Professional Baseball (NPB).

== Early baseball career ==
Shoji participated in the 2nd grade spring the 91th Japanese High School Baseball Invitational Tournament as a Third baseman of the Yokohama High School with Ryūki Watarai.

He went on to Kanagawa University, and recorded 116 hits in the Kanagawa University Baseball League.

== Professional career ==
On October 24, 2024, Shoji was drafted by the Fukuoka SoftBank Hawks in the second round in the 2024 Nippon Professional Baseball draft.

In 2025 season, Shoji made his Pacific League debut as a baserunner in the game against the Saitama Seibu Lions on May 5. He also recorded his first hit and stolen base in a game against the Orix Buffaloes on July 10, finished the regular season with a batting average of .235 over 26 games, and made his first appearance in the 2025 Japan Series.

In 2026 season, Shoji hit his first home run in the game against the Tohoku Rakuten Golden Eagles on September 26.
