= Tomoya Masaki =

Japanese baseball player (born 1999)

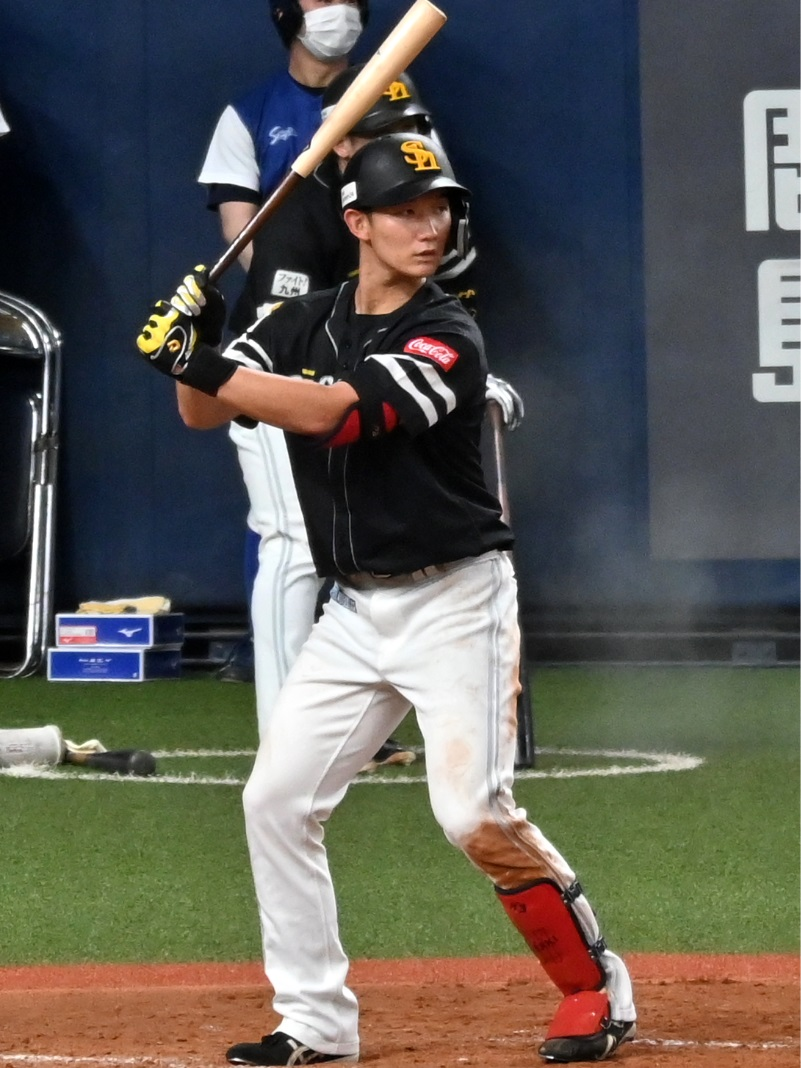
- Masaki with the Fukuoka SoftBank Hawks.

Fukuoka SoftBank Hawks – No. 31
- Outfielder
- Born: November 5, 1999 (age 26); Ōta, Tokyo, Japan
- Bats: Right Throws: Right

NPB debut
- April 7, 2022, for the Fukuoka SoftBank Hawks

NPB statistics (through 2025 season)
- Batting average: .251
- Home runs: 12
- Run batted in: 43
- Hits: 104

Teams
- Fukuoka SoftBank Hawks (2022–present)

Career highlights and awards
- Japan Series champion (2025, 2026); Japan Series MVP (2026)

Tomoya Masaki (正木 智也, Masaki Tomoya; born November 5, 1999) is a Japanese professional baseball outfielder for the Fukuoka SoftBank Hawks of Nippon Professional Baseball (NPB).

== Early baseball career ==
Masaki went on to Keio University and won the 50th Meiji Jingu Baseball Tournament in his sophomore year. He hit two home runs in the 70th Japan National Collegiate Baseball Championship during his senior year, helping Keio University win its first championship in 34 years. He was also awarded as the Most valuable player at this tournament.

== Professional career ==
On October 11, 2021, Masaki was drafted by the Fukuoka Softbank Hawks in the 2021 Nippon Professional Baseball draft.

On April 7, 2022, Masaki made his first league debut in the Pacific League against the Orix Buffaloes, as a starting lineup for the No.3 and left fielder. On April 9, he played as a no.8 and designated hitter against the Saitama Seibu Lions and recorded his first hit. On August 24, he recorded his first home run against the Tohoku Rakuten Golden Eagles. Masaki finished his rookie year with a .254 batting average, three home runs, and five runs batted in in 35 regular season games.

In 2023 season, Masaki performed well in spring training and was told by manager Hiroshi Fujimoto that he would be given a chance to get 50 at-bats, but his batting was sluggish and he did not get a chance to become a regular member. He also spent the season rehabbing with soreness in his right shoulder. As a result, he played only 15 games in the Pacific League.
