= 2026 Nippon Professional Baseball season =

77th annual season of Nippon Professional Baseball

2026 NPB season
- League: Nippon Professional Baseball
- Sport: Baseball
- Duration: March 27 – October 28
- Games: 143
- Teams: 12

Central League Pennant
- League champions: Hanshin Tigers
- Runners-up: Yomiuri Giants

Pacific League Pennant
- League champions: Fukuoka SoftBank Hawks
- Runners-up: Saitama Seibu Lions

Climax Series
- CL champions: Yokohama DeNA BayStars
- CL runners-up: Hanshin Tigers
- PL champions: Fukuoka SoftBank Hawks
- PL runners-up: Hokkaido Nippon-Ham Fighters

Japan Series
- Champions: Fukuoka SoftBank Hawks
- Runners-up: Yokohama DeNA BayStars
- Finals MVP: Tomoya Masaki (SoftBank)

NPB seasons
- ← 2025 2027 →

The 2026 Nippon Professional Baseball season was the 77th season of professional baseball in Japan since Nippon Professional Baseball (NPB) was reorganized in 1950. There are 12 NPB teams, split evenly between the Central League and Pacific League.

The Fukuoka SoftBank Hawks entered the season as the defending champions.

The 2026 season introduced a new playoff clause that stated that if the lower seeded team in the second round of the Climax Series finished either below .500 or more than 10 games behind the league's pennant winner, the lower seeded team would be placed with a 1 game disadvantage on top of the 1 game advantage the league's pennant winner receives in the second round, meaning that the lower seed would have to win 5 games while the pennant winner only had to win 3. On October 1st, with a win over the Tohoku Rakuten Golden Eagles, the Pacific League pennant winning Fukuoka SoftBank Hawks activated this clause in its first season of implementation by guaranteeing they would finish at least 10 games ahead of both the Saitama Seibu Lions and the Hokkaido Nippon-Ham Fighters.

== Regular season standings ==
2026 Central League regular season standings
Pos	Team	G	W	L	T	Pct.	GB	Home	Road
1	z – Hanshin Tigers	143	79	62	2	.560	—	37–33–2	42–29–0
2	y – Yomiuri Giants	143	76	64	3	.543	2½	39–31–2	37–33–1
3	y – Yokohama DeNA BayStars	143	71	69	3	.507	7½	39–30–3	32–39–0
4	Hiroshima Toyo Carp	143	61	78	4	.439	17	34–36–1	27–42–3
5	Tokyo Yakult Swallows	143	61	80	2	.433	18	29–40–2	32–40–0
6	Chunichi Dragons	143	60	81	2	.426	19	38–33–0	22–48–2

y – Clinched Climax Series berth; z – Clinched Central League pennant

2026 Pacific League regular season standings
Pos	Team	G	W	L	T	Pct.	GB	Home	Road
1	za – Fukuoka SoftBank Hawks	143	91	49	3	.650	—	49–23–0	42–26–3
2	y – Saitama Seibu Lions	143	79	60	4	.568	11½	41–29–2	38–31–2
3	y – Hokkaido Nippon-Ham Fighters	143	78	62	3	.557	13	42–28–2	36–34–1
4	Orix Buffaloes	143	65	76	2	.461	26½	41–29–1	24–47–1
5	Chiba Lotte Marines	143	63	77	3	.450	28	37–33–1	26–44–2
6	Tohoku Rakuten Golden Eagles	143	58	84	1	.408	34	34–37–0	24–47–1

y – Clinched Climax Series berth; z – Clinched Pacific League pennant; a – Clinched two-game advantage in Pacific League Climax Series

=== Interleague ===
2026 regular season interleague standings
Pos	Team	G	W	L	T	Pct.	GB	Home	Road
1	Saitama Seibu Lions^{†}	18	14	3	1	.824	—	7–2	7–1–1
2	Fukuoka SoftBank Hawks	18	14	4	0	.778	½	7–2	7–2
3	Hokkaido Nippon-Ham Fighters	18	14	4	0	.778	½	6–3	8–1
4	Yomiuri Giants	18	10	6	2	.625	3½	5–2–2	5–4
5	Chiba Lotte Marines	18	10	6	2	.625	3½	5–4	5–2–2
6	Orix Buffaloes	18	9	8	1	.529	5	7–2	2–6–1
7	Chunichi Dragons	18	7	11	0	.389	7½	4–5	3–6
8	Tokyo Yakult Swallows	18	6	11	1	.353	8	1–7–1	5–4
9	Hanshin Tigers	18	6	12	0	.333	8½	3–6	3–6
10	Hiroshima Toyo Carp	18	5	12	1	.294	9	3–5–1	2–7
11	Yokohama DeNA BayStars	18	5	13	0	.278	9½	3–6	2–7
12	Tohoku Rakuten Golden Eagles	18	4	14	0	.222	10½	2−7	2–7

^{†} Interleague champion

== Climax Series ==
First stage
Central League
2	Yomiuri Giants	0
3	Yokohama DeNA BayStars	2
Pacific League
2	Saitama Seibu Lions	1
3	Hokkaido Nippon-Ham Fighters	2

Final stage
1	Hanshin Tigers	1
3	Yokohama DeNA BayStars	4
1	Fukuoka SoftBank Hawks	3
3	Hokkaido Nippon-Ham Fighters	0

Japan Series
CL3	Yokohama DeNA BayStars	0
PL1	Fukuoka SoftBank Hawks	4

=== First stage ===
==== Central League ====
DeNA won the series, 2–0.

Game	Date	Score	Location	Time	Attendance
1	October 10	Yokohama DeNA BayStars – 2, Yomiuri Giants – 1	Tokyo Dome	2:37	42,232
2	October 11	Yokohama DeNA BayStars – 4, Yomiuri Giants – 1	Tokyo Dome	3:01	42,248

==== Pacific League ====
Nippon-Ham won the series, 2–1.

Game	Date	Score	Location	Time	Attendance
1	October 10	Hokkaido Nippon-Ham Fighters – 2, Saitama Seibu Lions – 3 (10)	Belluna Dome	3:06	27,602
2	October 11	Hokkaido Nippon-Ham Fighters – 1, Saitama Seibu Lions – 0	Belluna Dome	3:09	27,610
3	October 12	Hokkaido Nippon-Ham Fighters – 4, Saitama Seibu Lions – 1	Belluna Dome	3:19	27,571

=== Central League ===
DeNA won the series, 4–1.

Game	Date	Score	Location	Time	Attendance
1	October 14	Yokohama DeNA BayStars – 2, Hanshin Tigers – 0	Hanshin Koshien Stadium	3:11	42,645
2	October 15	Yokohama DeNA BayStars – 1, Hanshin Tigers – 0	Hanshin Koshien Stadium	2:55	42,643
3	October 16	Yokohama DeNA BayStars – 4, Hanshin Tigers – 0	Hanshin Koshien Stadium	2:48	42,644
4	October 17	Yokohama DeNA BayStars – 8, Hanshin Tigers – 5	Hanshin Koshien Stadium	3:54	42,648

=== Pacific League ===
SoftBank won the series, 3–0.

Game	Date	Score	Location	Time	Attendance
1	October 14	Hokkaido Nippon-Ham Fighters – 4, Fukuoka SoftBank Hawks – 6	Mizuho PayPay Dome Fukuoka	3:14	39,894
2	October 15	Hokkaido Nippon-Ham Fighters – 2, Fukuoka SoftBank Hawks – 6	Mizuho PayPay Dome Fukuoka	3:04	39,894
3	October 16	Hokkaido Nippon-Ham Fighters – 2, Fukuoka SoftBank Hawks – 6	Mizuho PayPay Dome Fukuoka	3:02	39,894

== 2026 Japan Series ==
SoftBank won the series, 4–0.

Game	Date	Score	Location	Time	Attendance
1	October 24	Fukuoka SoftBank Hawks – 3, Yokohama DeNA BayStars – 1 (11)	Yokohama Stadium	4:12	33,388
2	October 25	Fukuoka SoftBank Hawks – 4, Yokohama DeNA BayStars – 3 (10)	Yokohama Stadium	3:36	33,432
3	October 27	Yokohama DeNA BayStars – 1, Fukuoka SoftBank Hawks – 2 (10)	Mizuho PayPay Dome	3:20	36,800
4	October 28	Yokohama DeNA BayStars – 2, Fukuoka SoftBank Hawks – 4	Mizuho PayPay Dome Fukuoka	2:33	36,840

Note: All dates and times are in JST (Japan Standard Time).

== See also ==
- 2026 Major League Baseball season
- 2026 KBO League season
