= List of Nippon Professional Baseball players (S) =

The following is a list of Nippon Professional Baseball players with the last name starting with S, retired or active.

== S ==
- Takuma Sadaoka
- Hideki Saeki
- Takahiro Saeki
- Hajime Saito
- Hidemitsu Saitoh
- Kazumi Saito
- Manabu Saito
- Masaki Saito
- Mitsugu Saitoh
- Mitsuhiro Saitoh
- Shinsuke Saitoh
- Shogo Saitoh
- Takashi Saito
- Takayuki Saitoh
- Toshio Saitoh
- Yuki Saito
- Masashi Sajikihara
- Katsuhiko Saka
- Tomotaka Sakaguchi
- Daisuke Sakai
- Hiroki Sakai
- Junya Sakai
- Mitsujiro Sakai
- Tadaharu Sakai
- Tsutomu Sakai
- Yasushi Sakai
- Hayato Sakamoto
- Ryuichi Sakamoto
- Takuya Sakamoto
- Yataro Sakamoto
- Masami Sakohata
- Hirokazu Sakuma
- Masahiro Sakumoto
- Kodai Sakurai
- Shinichi Sakurai
- Yoshimi Sakurai
- Yukihiro Sakurai
- Keiichi Sakuta
- Hideki Samejima
- Hiroki Sanada
- Anthony Sanders
- Scott Sanders
- Kazunari Sanematsu
- Shigeki Sano
- Takahide Sano
- Julio Santana
- Hiroshi Santoh
- Takashi Sasagawa
- Akiyoshi Sasaki
- Katsutoshi Sasaki
- Kazuhiro Sasaki
- Kiyoshi Sasaki
- Kyosuke Sasaki
- Makoto Sasaki
- Shigeki Sasaki
- Shinji Sasaoka
- Yōichi Sasayama
- Kenta Satake
- Manabu Satake
- G. G. Sato
- Hideki Satoh
- Hiroshi Satoh
- Hiroyuki Satoh
- Kazuhiro Satoh
- Kenji Sato
- Kosuke Satoh
- Makoto Satoh
- Masaru Satoh
- Mitsuru Satoh
- Reinaldo Sato
- Ryota Satoh
- Sadaharu Satoh
- Shinichi Sato
- Shoma Sato (baseball, born 1989)
- Takeshi Satoh
- Tomoaki Satoh
- Tomoki Satoh
- Tsuyoshi Satoh
- Yasuyuki Satoh
- Yoshihiro Satoh
- Yoshinori Sato - born 1954
- Yoshinori Sato - born 1989
- Yukihiko Satoh
- Tomoya Satozaki
- Tsuyoshi Sawada
- Michihisa Sawai
- Ryosuke Sawai
- Eiji Sawamura
- Toshikazu Sawazaki
- Tomoya Sayashi
- Erik Schullstrom
- Mike Schultz
- Scott Seabol
- Chris Seelbach
- Fernando Seguignol
- Kiyokazu Seki
- Iori Sekiguchi
- Seiji Sekiguchi
- Yuta Sekiguchi
- Koichi Sekikawa
- Kentaro Sekimoto
- Hiroyuki Sekine
- Junzo Sekine
- Tomoyoshi Sekiya
- Masato Sekiyoshi
- Bill Selby
- Norbert Semanaka da Hossha
- Kensaku Senoo
- Yoshihiro Seo
- Dan Serafini
- Yuji Serizawa
- Terunobu Seto
- Andy Sheets
- Scott Sheldon
- Hiroshi Shibahara - born 1969
- Hiroshi Shibahara - born 1974
- Minoru Shibahara
- Hiroshi Shibakusa
- Kazuhiro Shibasaki
- Hiroyuki Shibata
- Kazuya Shibata
- Masaya Shibata
- Ryosuke Shibata
- Tomohide Shichino
- Munehiro Shida
- Takumi Shiigi
- Motohiro Shima
- Shigenobu Shima
- Akihiro Shimada
- Kazuteru Shimada
- Naoya Shimada
- Ikki Shimamura
- Yasuhito Shimao
- Tetsuya Shimata
- Shinya Shimawaki
- Takeshi Shimazaki
- Akinobu Shimizu
- Akio Shimizu
- Kiyohito Shimizu
- Masaji Shimizu
- Masaumi Shimizu
- Naoyuki Shimizu
- Takashi Shimizu
- Takayuki Shimizu
- Yoshiyuki Shimizu
- Yosuke Shimokubo
- Yuta Shimoshikiryo
- Makoto Shimoyama
- Shinji Shimoyama
- Tsuyoshi Shimoyanagi
- Tatsuya Shimozono
- Ayahito Shinada
- Kansuke Shinada
- Minoru Shindoh
- Tatsuya Shindoh
- Tsuyoshi Shinjo
- Junpei Shinoda
- Takayuki Shinohara
- Hiroshi Shintani
- Ken Shinzato
- Shoya Shinzato
- Tatsuya Shiokawa
- Kazuhiko Shiotani
- Daisuke Shioya
- Makoto Shiozaki
- Tetsuya Shiozaki
- Yuta Shirahama
- Kazuyuki Shirai
- Yasukatsu Shirai
- Katsumi Shiraishi
- Daisuke Shirakawa
- Hirokazu Shiranita
- Katsushi Shirasaka
- Yoshihisa Shiratake
- Hironori Shiratori
- Masaki Shiratori
- Noriyuki Shiroishi
- Itsuki Shoda
- Kozo Shoda
- Takahiro Shoda
- Daisuke Shoji
- Rick Short
- Eiji Shotsu
- Brian Shouse
- Jeff Schwarz
- Brian Sikorski
- Randall Simon
- Matt Skrmetta
- Terrmel Sledge
- Mark Smith
- Kota Soejima
- Naoki Sogabe
- Takatomi Sogawa
- Yuji Sogawa
- Katsuo Soh
- Shunyo Soh
- Kensaku Someda
- Shawn Sonnier
- Kazumi Sonokawa
- Alfonso Soriano
- Eishin Soyogi
- Shane Spencer
- Matt Stairs
- Jason Standridge
- Rob Stanifer
- Victor Starffin
- Lee Stevens
- Josh Stewart
- Yutaka Sudo
- Godai Suehiro
- Masafumi Suenaga
- Masashi Suenaga
- Yo Sugihara
- Kiyohiko Sugimoto
- Masato Sugimoto
- Naofumi Sugimoto
- Yu Sugimoto
- Shigeru Sugishita
- Isamu Sugita
- Toshiya Sugiuchi
- Kiyoshi Sugiura
- Tadashi Sugiura
- Haruki Sugiyama
- Kento Sugiyama
- Naohisa Sugiyama
- Naoki Sugiyama
- Shunsuke Sugiyama
- Hironori Suguro
- Mitsuo Sumi
- Ginjiro Sumitani
- Hayato Sumitomo
- Yoshinori Sumiyoshi
- Dong-Yeol Sun
- Hideki Sunaga
- Kuninobu Sunaoshi
- Yuki Suzue
- Atsushi Suzuki

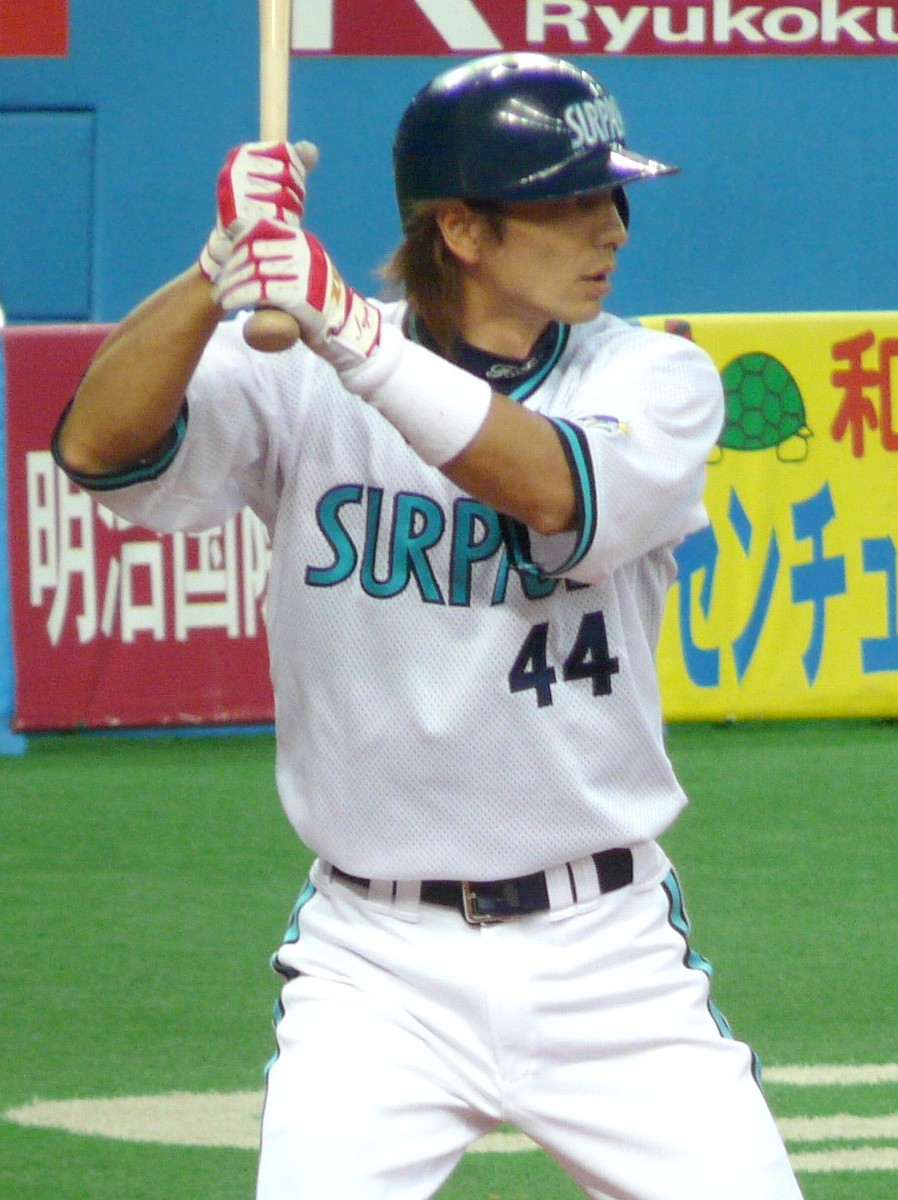
Fumihiro Suzuki in 2008.

- Fumihiro Suzuki
- Hiroki Suzuki
- Ichiro Suzuki
- Keishi Suzuki
- Ken Suzuki - born 1969
- Ken Suzuki - born 1970
- Makoto Suzuki - born 1975
- Makoto Suzuki - born 1985
- Masamitsu Suzuki
- Nozomu Suzuki
- Taira Suzuki
- Takahiro Suzuki
- Takahisa Suzuki
- Takanori Suzuki
- Takeyuki Suzuki
- Tetsu Suzuki
- Yoshihiro Suzuki - born 1963
- Yoshihiro Suzuki - born 1983
- Brian Sweeney
