= 2003 Japan Series =

Sports event

Team (Wins)	Managers	Season
Fukuoka Daiei Hawks (4)	Sadaharu Oh	82–55–3 (.596), 4½ GA
Hanshin Tigers (3)	Senichi Hoshino	87–51–2 (.629), 14½ GA
- Dates: October 18–27
- MVP: Toshiya Sugiuchi (Fukuoka)
- FSA: Tomoaki Kanemoto (Hanshin)

Broadcast
- Television: RKB (Game 1, JNN), Nippon TV (Game 2, NNN), ABC (Game 3, ANN), MBS (Game 4, JNN), Yomiuri TV (Game 5, NNN), TV Asahi (Game 6, ANN), TVQ and TV Tokyo (Game 7, TXN and others)
- TV announcers: Masayoshi Kayano (RKB), Masashi Funakoshi (NTV), Shiryu Ito (ABC), Makoto Akagi (MBS), Jun-ya Yamamoto (YTV), Takao Nakayama (EX), Ryoko Kaji (TVQ)
- Radio: NHK, JRN, NRN, Radio Nippon

The 2003 Japan Series was the Nippon Professional Baseball (NPB) championship for the 2003 season. The 54th edition of the Series was a best-of-seven playoff that matched the Pacific League champion Fukuoka Daiei Hawks against the Central League champion Hanshin Tigers. the home team won every match-up of the series, which featured three sayonara (walk-off) victories, including back-to-back wins for the Tigers at Koshien Stadium. the Hawks ultimately clinched the title by winning Game 7 at the Fukuoka Dome. This was the final Japan Series before the Pacific League introduced a playoff system, a format the Central League subsequently adopt in 2007.

== Fukuoka Daiei Hawks ==
The Hawks were looking for their second championship in five years (they defeated the Chunichi Dragons in 1999, four games to one), and this was their third appearance in that span. Despite the team's youth, slugger and manager Sadaharu Oh whipped the young team into shape in the previous seasons. Daiei had the best offense in the league, led by Nobuhiko Matsunaka, Kenji Johjima, and Tadahito Iguchi, with speedsters Munenori Kawasaki and Arihito Muramatsu setting up the sluggers with their speed. The Hawks also had four hitters with 100 or more runs batted in and the team batted a league record .297.

Pitching-wise, the Hawks boasted the best young rotation in the league, with 20-game winner Kazumi Saitoh leading the charge. Toshiya Sugiuchi and Rookie of the Year Tsuyoshi Wada were also key cogs in the Hawks' pennant-winning season. While sometimes shaky, Takayuki Shinohara was pegged the team's closer, and he was helped by a veteran set of relievers.

== Hanshin Tigers ==
On the other side, the Tigers were looking for their first Japan Series championship since 1985, and only their second in the team's long and storied history. This was their fourth appearance in the Japan Series, and their first since 1985. The tigers were managed by Senichi Hoshino.

The Tigers had a 20-game winner of their own in Kei Igawa leading the starting rotation. Other key pitchers included veteran Hideki Irabu, who was in his first year back from major league stints with the New York Yankees, Montreal Expos, and Texas Rangers; foreign lefty Trey Moore, a key figure in the Tigers' rotation; and foreign lefty Jeff Williams who led the team with 25 saves.

Makoto Imaoka and Norihiro Akahoshi led the team at the top of the order, followed by power hitters Tomoaki Kanemoto and Shinjiro Hiyama.

== Background and series hype ==
Hanshin fans, known for their almost fanatical devotion to their team, were looking to help their team lift the so-called "Curse of the Colonel", an incident in which a local Kentucky Fried Chicken's Colonel Sanders was thrown into the Dotonbori Canal by fans celebrating the team clinching the Central League Pennant (the Colonel was believed to look like MVP Randy Bass), but was not found the next day (the colonel statue would not be found until 2009). Hanshin had finished fourth or lower in the Central League in 15 of the last 18 years, and so the 2003 season was truly a Cinderella Season for the team.

Another element adding to the hype was that 2003 was the first time that the league had seen two 20-game winners: Kazumi Saitoh for Daiei, and Kei Igawa for Hanshin. The two would eventually be named co-winners of the Sawamura Award.

The managers also added to the series drama. First of all, this was a rematch of the 1999 Japan Series from a managerial standpoint. Senichi Hoshino was the manager of the Chunichi Dragons four years prior, and was defeated by Oh's Hawks in 5 games to win their first Japan Series title since 1964. Secondly, news leaked prior to Game 1 that Hoshino intended to retire after the Series due to health concerns (Hoshino had been sick for many a game during the 2003 season).

== Summary ==
Game	Score	Date	Location	Attendance
1	Hawks – 5, Tigers – 4	October 18	Fukuoka Dome	36,643
2	Hawks – 13, Tigers – 0	October 19	Fukuoka Dome	36,794
3	Tigers – 2, Hawks – 1	October 22	Koshien Stadium	47,722
4	Tigers – 6, Hawks – 5	October 23	Koshien Stadium	47,746
5	Tigers – 3, Hawks – 2	October 24	Koshien Stadium	47,775
6	Hawks – 5, Tigers – 1	October 26	Fukuoka Dome	36,619
7	Hawks – 6, Tigers – 2	October 27	Fukuoka Dome	36,341

== Game summaries ==
=== Game 1 ===
Saturday, October 18, 2003 6:15 pm (JST) at Fukuoka Dome in Fukuoka, Japan
Team	1	2	3	4	5	6	7	8	9	R	H	E
Hanshin	0	0	0	2	0	1	1	0	0	4	6	0
Daiei	0	1	0	2	0	1	0	0	1x	5	13	2
Starting pitchers: HAN: Kei Igawa (0-0); FDH: Kazumi Saitoh (0-0); WP: Takayuki Shinohara (1–0) LP: Yuya Andoh (0–1); Home runs: HAN: none FDH: Kenji Johjima (1); Attendance: 36,105

The first game was a matchup of matching 20-game winners: Igawa for Hanshin, and Saitoh for Daiei. Saitoh got out of a jam in the first, and Igawa struck out Hiroshi Shibahara and Munenori Kawasaki in his half of the first. The game would turn into an exciting back-and-forth affair.

Daiei would score the first run of the series in the next inning, with a walk to Pedro Valdés and a single by Julio Zuleta setting up Arihito Muramatsu, who laced a single up the middle to score Valdes. Daiei almost scored again in the 3rd, when Kawasaki beat out a line drive that bounced off Igawa's glove and ricocheted to 2nd base. Hanshin almost had Kawasaki, but the speedy Hawks 3rd baseman dove into first head-first to beat the throw. Tadahito Iguchi then lined an Igawa offering down the 3rd base line and into left field for a double. Nobuhiko Matsunaka caught a bad break though, as he smoked a liner to 3rd, but it was caught and Kawasaki was doubled up to end the inning.

Hanshin got on the board and took the lead in the 4th when, with runners on 1st and 2nd, Akihiro Yano took the stage. Saitoh tried to run Yano up and in with a pitch, but Yano connected and knocked it into deep right-center for a 2-run triple, putting Hanshin up, 2–1. Daiei responded in the bottom of the inning, with star catcher Kenji Johjima crushing a high Igawa pitch into the left-field stands and pulling Daiei even, 2–2. Valdes then singled up the middle, Zuleta was hit with a pitch, and Muramatsu singled up the middle to load the bases with nobody out. The light-hitting Yusuke Torigoe then came up, and he lifted a sacrifice fly to the warning track in left, which put Daiei ahead again, 3–2.

Hanshin would pull even again in the 6th on a throwing error from Johjima, allowing the runner to advance to third. Arias then came up and singled the runner on 3rd home to tie the score for a 3rd time, 3–3. As was the theme in the game, Hanshin had a chance to break the deadlock and bust the game open after a walk, but Yano grounded into a 5–4–3 double play to end the inning. Igawa was replaced by Jerrod Riggan in the bottom of the 6th, and Riggan was touched up immediately for a run when Iguchi singled home Shibahara.

Saitoh stayed in for the start of the 7th but walked Atsushi Fujimoto and slugger Tomoaki Kanemoto with 2 down. Saitoh was finished for the day, as he was replaced by Yoshida. Hiyama came up and singled in Fujimoto to tie the game up once again, 4–4. Hanshin would threaten again in their half of the 9th, getting Makoto Imaoka to 2nd, but Hawks reliever Takayuki Shinohara snuffed out the threat by getting Kanemoto to foul out.

That set the stage for the Hawks half of the 9th inning. Yuya Andoh walked Matsunaka and Johjima singled through the right side to put runners on 1st and 2nd. Andoh struck out Valdes for the 2nd out to set the stage for first-year foreigner Zuleta. Zuleta lifted and Andoh pitch to left-center, and it landed just out of the reach of the center fielder to give the Hawks the 5–4 sayonara victory and a 1–0 lead in the series.

=== Game 2 ===
Sunday, October 19, 2003 6:15 pm (JST) at Fukuoka Dome in Fukuoka, Japan
Team	1	2	3	4	5	6	7	8	9	R	H	E
Hanshin	0	0	0	0	0	0	0	0	0	0	6	1
Daiei	0	4	1	0	0	0	5	3	X	13	16	0
Starting pitchers: HAN: Hideki Irabu (0–0); FDH: Toshiya Sugiuchi (0–0); WP: Toshiya Sugiuchi (1–0) LP: Hideki Irabu (0–1); Home runs: HAN: none FDH: Kenji Johjima (2), Julio Zuleta (1), Pedro Valdés (1); Attendance: 36,246

Riding the momentum from the sayonara victory the previous night, the Hawks took the field and crushed the Tigers and their starting pitcher, Hideki Irabu. Toshiya Sugiuchi started for the Hawks, and like Saitoh the night before, got into a small bit of trouble in the first. Imaoka singled his way on, then was sacrificed to 2nd by Norihiro Akahoshi, but Kanemoto struck out, and Hiyama flew out to right. Similarly, Kawasaki singled his way on and stole second, but Matsunaka grounded to first to end the home half of the inning.

Daiei broke the game open in the 2nd. With one out, Valdes, Zuleta, and Muramatsu all singled their way on. Veteran shortstop Yusuke Torigoe, not known for his bat, doubled them all home as he put Daiei out in front, 3–0. Shibahara singled Torigoe to 3rd, but was caught stealing. With 2 down, Kawasaki kept the inning alive by tripling in Torigoe. Mercifully, Iguchi grounded out to end the four-run second. That would be all Daiei would need in the game.

Johjima would keep up the Hawks number-one offensive attack by hitting his second home run of the series, a solo shot, in the bottom of the 3rd. The very next inning, Muramatsu singled and Torigoe walked, which would end Irabu's bad outing. Makoto Yoshino would take over for him, and Shibahara immediately sacrificed Muramatsu and Torigoe to 2nd and 3rd, respectively. Yoshino would load the bases with a walk to Kawasaki, but again, Matsunaka could not come through in the clutch, grounding back to Yoshino to end the inning.

Still leading 5–0 in the 7th, new pitcher Takehito Kanazawa gave up singles to Matsunaka and Valdes, then helplessly watched as Zuleta crushed his first home run of the series, a three-run blast that propelled Daiei to an 8–0 lead. To make matters worse, Torigoe walked, then Shibahara drove Torigoe in for the fourth run of the inning. Kawasaki then got in on the hit parade by tripling in Shibahara for the 5th and final run of the inning and a 10–0 lead.

Sugiuchi was on cruise control after the first inning, throwing eight shutout innings and only surrendering four hits in that span.

The Hawks would end the scoring in the 8th inning, tacking on three more thanks to a throwing error by Kanazawa, and a three-run home run from Valdes. Rookie Nagisa Arakaki would mop up for Daiei in the 9th to end the game. Daiei took a commanding two games to none lead in the series. Little did the Hawks know that the series was just beginning, as the next three would be taking place at Koshien Stadium.

=== Game 3 ===
Wednesday, October 22, 2003 6:16 pm (JST) at Koshien Stadium in Nishinomiya, Japan
Team	1	2	3	4	5	6	7	8	9	10	R	H	E
Daiei	1	0	0	0	0	0	0	0	0	0	1	5	0
Hanshin	0	0	0	1	0	0	0	0	0	1x	2	5	0
Starting pitchers: FDH: Tsuyoshi Wada (0-0); HAN: Trey Moore (0-0); WP: Makoto Yoshino (1–0) LP: Takayuki Shinohara (1–1); Home runs: FDH: none HAN: Tomoaki Kanemoto (1); Attendance: 47,159

Returning home, the Tigers were in a must-win situation, as the Hawks potentially could take a 3–0 series lead. Trey Moore started for the Tigers, while Daiei countered with lefty Tsuyoshi Wada, who won 14 games during his rookie campaign. The left-handed Moore started the game by throwing the first pitch of the game over Shibahara's head. Shibahara would strike out, but the Hawks got their revenge by driving in the first run of the game, as Matsunaka drove in Kawasaki after he and Iguchi singled. Daiei almost had more, but Iguchi was cut down at home on an infield grounder by Johjima, and Valdes struck out to end the inning.

In the bottom of the 3rd against Wada, Moore helped his own cause by singling his way on, but nothing came of it. Kanemoto made sure that his team pulled even the very next inning though, as he took a low Wada fastball and deposited it into the right-center field stands, sending the Hanshin faithful into a frenzy. Kanemoto's solo shot tied the game, 1–1.

Already a pitcher's duel, Moore and Wada matched zeroes, with both teams threatening at times. Daiei had a chance in the 6th with 1 out, but Iguchi flew out to the warning track in left, and Matsunaka weakly grounded out to the catcher. In the 7th, the Hawks had Valdes and 2nd and Muramatsu at 1st on a controversial hit-batsman call (Hoshino-kantoku argued that the ball hit the knob of Muramatsu's bat). Wada was pinch-hit for by Ohmichi with runners on 2nd and 3rd after Torigoe sacrificed, but Moore got Ohmichi to ground out to 2nd to end the threat.

Katsunori Okamoto took over for Wada and struck out the side in the 7th, and wiggled out of a jam in the 8th. On the other side, Yoshino took over in the 9th after Moore was pinch-hit for in the bottom of the previous inning. Yoshino struck out Valdes, then Johjima was caught stealing to end the inning.

Okamoto got the first out of the 9th, then turned it over to Shinohara for the lefty-on-lefty matchups. He induced a flyout with Akahoshi, then got Kanemoto on a check swing, in which Kanemoto was convinced he did not go around.

In the 10th inning, Yoshino stayed out on the mound and worked a 1-2-3 inning, in which Shinohara was allowed to bat, but struck out. The decision to not pinch-hit would come back to haunt Oh-kantoku as Shinohara started the inning well by striking out Hirosawa, but Arias then walked, and Hiyama singled, sending Arias to 3rd. Yano was intentionally walked to load the bases, setting up Fujimoto. He lifted a high sacrifice fly to center to score Arias and give Hanshin the 2–1 sayonara victory, and also make the series 2 games to 1 in favor of Daiei.

=== Game 4 ===
Thursday, October 23, 2003 6:15 pm (JST) at Koshien Stadium in Nishinomiya, Japan
Team	1	2	3	4	5	6	7	8	9	10	R	H	E
Daiei	0	1	0	0	0	0	3	1	0	0	5	11	0
Hanshin	3	0	0	0	0	1	0	1	0	1x	6	7	0
Starting pitchers: FDH: Brandon Knight (0-0); HAN: Kei Igawa (0-0); WP: Jeff Williams (1–0) LP: Nagisa Arakaki (0–1); Home runs: FDH: Nobuhiko Matsunaka (1); HAN: Tomoaki Kanemoto (2, 3); Attendance: 47,200

With a chance to tie the series at 2 games apiece, Hanshin sent the ace, Igawa, to the mound on short rest. Igawa took a pounding in Game 1, but in Game 4 he was hungry to win one for his team. Brandon Knight was called on to answer for the Hawks.

In the first inning, controversy ensued with an apparent safe call when Akahoshi attempted to steal 2nd. Replays showed that the Hanshin outfielder was clearly out, but he was called safe by the 2nd base umpire. After Kanemoto walked (Knight's 2nd walk of the inning), Hiyama doubled home both Akahoshi and Kanemoto to put Hanshin on top quickly, 2–0. After a strikeout, Hiyama was driven in by Kataoka for a 3–0 lead.

Matsunaka flashed some of his power in the top of the 2nd inning by crushing a letter-high Igawa slider to the back screen in center field. Knight then settled down for Daiei, as the game stayed close until the 6th inning. Kanemoto took a Watanabe pitch and hit a home run even further than Matsunaka's blast, which padded the Hanshin lead to 4–1.

In the 7th, Matsunaka led off with a double to left, then Johjima quickly drove him home with a double to left to cut the Tigers' lead in half, 4–2. After Fujimoto made a great diving play to save a run (but no out was recorded), Torigoe brought Johjima in anyway with a bloop single to cut Hanshin's lead to 4–3. Igawa then loaded the bases after hitting Muramatsu on the elbow with a pitch. Andoh was brought in to get the pitch-hitter, but Andoh issued a bases-loaded walk to tie the game.

Andoh's control problems persisted in the 8th, as he walked Matsunaka to start the inning, but a great diving play by Fujimoto started a 6–4–3 double play to put 2 away in the inning. However, the Hawks would rally, with Valdes singling, Shibahara walking, and Torigoe reaching on a swinging bunt and he also performed head-first slide into first base to beat the throw. With the bases loaded and 2 out, utility-man Mitsuru Honma grounded a pitch back to Andoh, but it bounced off him, and he couldn't come up with the ball in time to get Honma, giving the Hawks a 5–4 lead, after starting the game so poorly. The previous game's hero Yoshiro came in and got the third out to end the inning.

With the specter of a 1–3 deficit in the series looming over their heads, Hanshin once again rallied, as Kanemoto walked to start the inning, then stole second after Hiyama struck out. On a 1–2 count, George Arias came through with a base hit to left field, scoring Kanemoto and tying the game up again at five.

Daiei threatened in the 9th with one out. With a runner on first and Iguchi batting, Riggan was called for a balk, and then sacrificed the runner to 3rd. Riggan was replaced by Jeff Williams, who walked Matsunaka, but the runner on third was cut down at home on a Johjima grounder, and then Valdes struck out. Arakaki worked a scoreless 9th to send the game to extra innings for the 2nd straight night.

Williams struck out two of the three batters he faced in his half of the 10th, which was perfect. With one down in the bottom of the 10th inning, Arakaki left a slider over the middle of the plate, and Kanemoto golfed it into the right-field stands for his 2nd home run of the game, pulling the Tigers even in the series with a 6–5 win.

=== Game 5 ===
Friday, October 24, 2003 6:15 pm (JST) at Koshien Stadium in Nishinomiya, Japan
Team	1	2	3	4	5	6	7	8	9	R	H	E
Daiei	0	2	0	0	0	0	0	0	0	2	5	0
Hanshin	1	0	0	0	0	2	0	0	X	3	8	0
Starting pitchers: FDH: Kazumi Saitoh (0-0); HAN: Tsuyoshi Shimoyanagi (0-0); WP: Tsuyoshi Shimoyanagi (1–0) LP: Kazumi Saitoh (0–1) Sv: Jeff Williams (1); Home runs: FDH: Valdes (2); HAN: Kanemoto (4); Attendance: 47,366

With a chance to push themselves to the brink of their first Japan Series championship in 18 years, Hanshin took the field for the third straight day. Hoshino-kantoku sent Tsuyoshi Shimoyanagi to the mound against Hawks Game 1 starter, Kazumi Saitoh.

In the first inning, Kanemoto picked up right where he left off the previous night, hitting his 4th home run of the series and homering for the 3rd game in a row with 2 down. In the ensuing inning, Daiei vaulted into the lead with an opposite-field home run from Valdes that hit the foul pole in left and gave Daiei a 2–1 lead. Shimoyanagi did settle down and got the next three Hawks in order.

Hanshin threatened in the 2nd when Arias singled his way on, but a strike'-em-out, throw-'em-out double play and another strikeout of Yano ended the threat. Daiei had something of their own going in the 3rd, but the Hawks themselves had a runner cut down at 2nd. Daiei would threaten again in the 6th with a runner on 2nd, but Shimoyanagi struck out Johjima to end the inning.

In Hanshin's half of the 6th, singles from Imaoka and Akahoshi and a walk to Kanemoto loaded the bases with 2 out. Hiyama came up and laced a single to left, scoring both Imaoka and Akahoshi and giving Hanshin a 3–2 lead. For the third straight day, Yoshino came on in relief in the 7th. He would get Valdes swinging, but was relieved by Riggan after giving up a single to Shibahara. Riggan got Zuleta to pop out and struck out Honma to end the inning.

In the 8th, a scary moment happened for the Hawks. With one on, Akahoshi laid down a sacrifice bunt to try to advance Shuta to 2nd. Shinohara threw to 2nd to try to get Shuta, but the Tigers runner collided with Kawasaki, who was covering. Kawasaki was carried out on a stretcher. Shinohara, with Shuta on 3rd and nobody out, managed to get a groundout and a fly out to short left field, not enough to score Shuta. Okamoto took over and walked Arias intentionally to bring up Okihara. He struck out looking to leave the bases loaded.

Williams was brought on in the 9th to slam the door on the Hawks and send the series back to Fukuoka with the Tigers leading, 3–2. The foreign sidearmer did just that, striking out Valdes and Shibahara to end the game 3–2, and put the Tigers ahead in the series, 3–2. Hanshin was just one win away from their first Japan Series title in 18 years.

=== Game 6 ===
Sunday, October 26, 2003 6:15 pm (JST) at Fukuoka Dome in Fukuoka, Japan
Team	1	2	3	4	5	6	7	8	9	R	H	E
Hanshin	0	0	0	1	0	0	0	0	0	1	6	0
Daiei	2	0	1	0	0	1	0	0	X	5	9	0
Starting pitchers: HAN: Hideki Irabu (0–1); FDH: Toshiya Sugiuchi (1–0); WP: Toshiya Sugiuchi (2–0) LP: Hideki Irabu (0–2) Sv: Katsunori Okamoto (1); Home runs: HAN: Shinjiro Hiyama (1); FDH: Tadahito Iguchi (1), Pedro Valdés (3); Attendance: 36,188

With Daiei needing a win to extend the series, they went to Game 2 starter Sugiuchi. Irabu took the mound for the Tigers to turn the pitching matchup into a rematch of Game 2. Unfortunately, it was a case of deja vu for Irabu and the Tigers. In the very first inning, Irabu gave up a 2-run home run to Tadahito Iguchi, who was having a quiet series up to that point. Daiei led 2–0, and threatened to add more, but Irabu struck out Valdes to end the inning. The Hawks would threaten again in the 2nd with Torigoe reaching on a fielder's choice and subsequently stealing second, but Muramatsu popped out to end the threat.

Hanshin threatened themselves in the 3rd putting a runner on 2nd, but Imaoka grounded out to end the inning. After Kawasaki reached after getting hit with a pitch and stole second, Iguchi hit a high chopper that Fujimoto misplayed, which allowed Kawasaki to score and extend Daiei's lead to 3–0. Irabu was replaced with Fukuhara, who surrendered a double to Matsunaka and walked Johjima, but got out of the jam.

In the 4th, Hanshin would score their only run of the day, when Shinjiro Hiyama crushed a Sugiuchi pitch that he left middle-in into the right-field stands to cut Daiei's lead to 3–1.

Daiei would strike again in the 6th when Zuleta singled, and Shibahara barely missed a home run by doubling high off the wall. An off-balance throw from the outfield allowed Zuleta to score easily and give Daiei the 4–1 lead. They almost added another run in their Lucky 7 thanks again to the efforts of Kawasaki, who rifled a Fukuhara pitch off his hip, then sliding head-first into first to beat the throw. Kawasaki then stole second easily, but was stranded at third when Iguchi grounded out and Matsunaka struck out at the hands of Yoshino.

Ishige took over for Yoshino in the 8th, but was greeted by Pedro Valdés, who hit his third home run of the series, a solo shot that put the Hawks ahead 5–1. That would end the scoring, as the Tigers could not score off Okamoto in the 9th despite getting Akahoshi to 3rd. The series was tied, with a deciding 7th game coming the next day at the same venue. The home team had won every game in the series so far. Could Hanshin turn it around and win the series?

=== Game 7 ===
Monday, October 27, 2003 6:15 pm (JST) at Fukuoka Dome in Fukuoka, Japan
Team	1	2	3	4	5	6	7	8	9	R	H	E
Hanshin	0	0	0	0	1	0	0	0	1	2	6	0
Daiei	2	0	3	0	0	1	0	0	X	6	13	1
Starting pitchers: HAN: Trey Moore (0-0); FDH: Tsuyoshi Wada (0-0); WP: Tsuyoshi Wada (1–0) LP: Trey Moore (0–1); Home runs: HAN: Kentaro Sekimoto (1), Katsumi Hirosawa (1); FDH: Tadahito Iguchi (2), Kenji Johjima (3, 4); Attendance: 35,963

The starting pitchers for the deciding Game 7 were a rematch of Game 3: Trey Moore for the Tigers, Tsuyoshi Wada for the Hawks. The Tigers threatened in the first on a hit by Imaoka and a throwing error by Wada, but Arias grounded into a 4–6–3 double play to end the Tigers threat. Unlike Hanshin, Daiei made the most of their chance in the first inning, as Muramatsu singled and Kawasaki walked. Iguchi got the former two to 2nd and 3rd on a fielder's choice, and Matsunaka made the most of his chance by singling in both runners to stake the Hawks to a 2–0 lead off Moore, who put up 8 innings of one-run ball in his first appearance. Moore stopped the threat by striking out Johjima and Valdes to end the inning.

In their half of the 3rd, the Hawks once again flashed their offensive prowess and put the game and the series away. With Kawasaki on second, it brought up Iguchi, whose bat had heated up in the last game. The Hawks shortstop got a pitch to hit and didn't miss, sending it to the bleachers and giving the Hawks a 4–0 lead. The next batter was Johjima, who also got in on the fun, hitting a home run himself and extending Daiei's lead to 5–0. It was the 3rd inning, and already the Hawks had their 2nd Japan Series championship in 5 years within reach.

Wada had barely any trouble until the 5th inning, when Kentaro Sekimoto hit a home run of his own into the bleachers to put Hanshin on the board, 5–1. Hanshin threatened further, with Imaoka and Akahoshi singling. Kanemoto lifted a high fly ball to center, but it ended up being a long flyout. Hiyama came up with a chance to turn the tables and pull Hanshin closer, but he was called out on strikes to end the inning.

In the 6th, Johjima hit his 2nd home run of the game and 4th of the series off Riggan. Daiei was thoroughly in command, 6–1. The Hawks would threaten again in the 7th, but a bad sacrifice bunt by Muramatsu led to Torigoe being called out at 3rd after he doubled. Muramatsu reached, and he reached 2nd on a Kawasaki sacrifice, then Muramatsu stole 3rd. Iguchi hit a little flare to 2nd, but it was caught by Imaoka to end the inning.

With 2 out, pinch-hitter Katsumi Hirosawa was called on to try to start a rally. He did pull Hanshin one run closer with a solo home run, but it was too little, too late. Wada struck out Okihara for a complete game and to end the series, 4 games to 3 in favor of Daiei.

Toshiya Sugiuchi was named the MVP of the series. In two starts, he was 2–0, giving up only one run in 16 innings of work.

== Cultural references ==
The Japanese variety show Gaki no Tsukai referenced this series when the comedy duo Downtown (Hitoshi Matsumoto and Masatoshi Hamada) bet on who would win the Japan Series. Hamada chose Hanshin, while Matsumoto chose Daiei. Hamada lost the bet, and he was forced into one of the duo's infamous batsu (punishment) games.

== See also ==
- 2003 World Series
- 2003
