= Yusuke Oyama =

Japanese baseball player (born 1994)

Yūsuke Ōyama
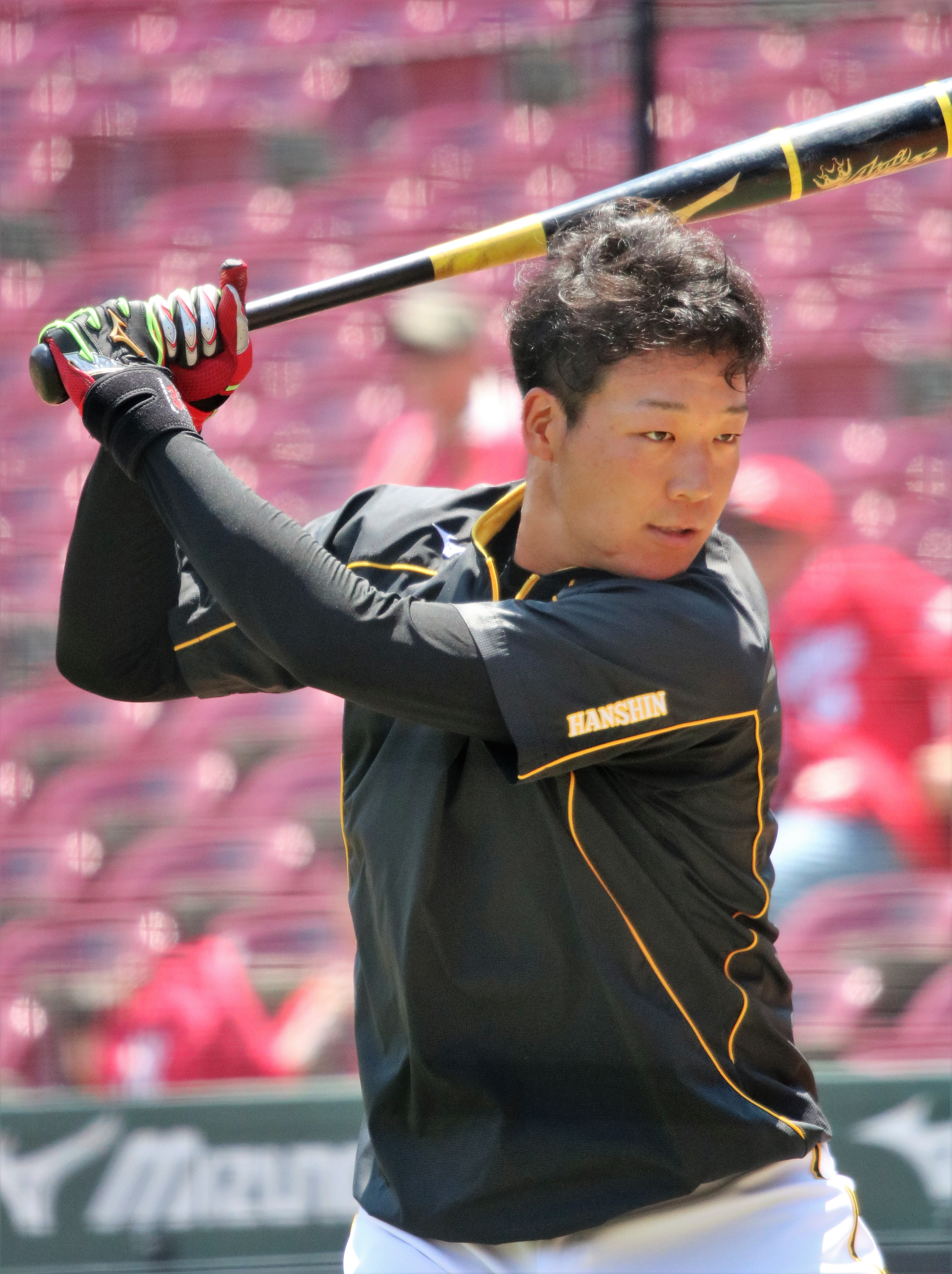
- Oyama batting for the Tigers

Hanshin Tigers – No. 3
- First baseman
- Born: December 19, 1994 (age 31); Shimotsuma, Ibaraki, Japan
- Bats: Right Throws: Right

NPB debut
- June 23, 2017, for the Hanshin Tigers

NPB statistics (through 2025 season)
- Batting average: .268
- Home runs: 150
- Runs batted in: 626
- Stats at Baseball Reference

Teams
- Hanshin Tigers (2017–present)

Career highlights and awards
- Interleague play CL Nippon Life Award Winner (2022); 2× Central League Mitsui Golden Glove Award (2023, 2025); 2× Central League Best Nine Award (2023, 2025); 3× NPB All-Star (2022, 2023, 2025); Japan Series champion (2023)

Yūsuke Ōyama (大山 悠輔, Ōyama Yūsuke; born December 19, 1994) is a Japanese professional baseball first baseman for the Hanshin Tigers of Nippon Professional Baseball (NPB). As a player, he has made the All-Star team three times, won the Best Nine Award twice and helped his team win the 2023 Japan Series.

== Early baseball career ==
Yūsuke started playing softball in 1st grade as both a pitcher and infielder, and continued until junior high. He doubled as a pitcher and infielder for Tsukuba Shuei High, but his team never made it to the national tournaments in Koshien. He hit a total of 27 home runs in high school.

He entered Hakuoh University in Tochigi Prefecture and played solely as 3rd baseman as their team participated in the Kankoshin Student Baseball Federation League. In his 4th year, he batted an average of .417 and set a league record of 8 home runs in a single tournament. He was also awarded for the most runs batted in (20 RBI). In all of his 98-game appearances, he recorded 119 hits and 93 runs, including 16 homeruns.

== Professional career ==
=== Hanshin Tigers ===
Ōyama was the Tigers' first pick at the 2016 NPB Draft. He signed with Hanshin for a contract of 100 million yen, 50 million signing bonus for an estimated annual salary of 15 million. He inherited the jersey number 3, formerly worn by retired infielder Kentaro Sekimoto.

==== 2017 ====
Oyama joined the main squad spring camp training but struggled at the plate as he went hitless for 17 at-bats. Despite batting .333 in 9 appearances during the pre-season games, he was sent back to the farms as there was a surplus of infielders in the main roster.

Oyama spent the 1st half of the season playing in Western League (farm games), where until June, he averaged .232 and batted in 14 runs (with one home run). Finally on June 23, he was called to pinch hit against the Hiroshima Toyo Carp in Mazda Stadium. On July 1, he notched his first career hit and first career home run which won the match against the Tokyo Yakult Swallows in Koshien Stadium. He became the 7th Hanshin rookie to notch a home run as his first hit; this was last accomplished 30 years ago by Hiroshi Yagi. By the end of July, he was batting third, and continued to hit well in the succeeding games. On August 18, he recorded the first 5-RBI game of his career including a three-run home run. He was assigned the clean up spot in the next month, and when he notched his 6th homerun on September 2, he became the first Hanshin rookie to hit a home run as a clean up batter. He ended the season with a .237 average, seven home runs and 38 RBI in 198 at bats. Oyama also finished second in the Central League Rookie of the Year voting behind Chunichi Dragons shortstop Yōta Kyōda.

Oyama continued to bat clean up during the post-season Climax Series games against the Yokohama DeNA BayStars, and on October 15, he went 4-for-5 (1B9, HR7, 2B9, 2B8, F9) and tied the playoffs record for most hits in a game with 15 other players. He is the first rookie to accomplish the feat during post-season play (including the Nippon Series), and the fourth rookie in Climax Series history to hit a home run. He notched seven hits and four RBI during the three playoff games before Hanshin got eliminated.

His performance for the season earned him a 10 million pay raise, bringing his annual salary to 25 million yen.。

==== 2018 ====
He played for the Samurai Japan in the 2018 ENEOS Samurai Japan Series versus Australia before the season started. He managed to secure the third-base position during the season-opener, but saw fewer plate appearances as he went on a hitting slump in April, and was eventually sent back to the farm on June 22. Oyama redeemed himself by batting .400 in eight farm games, recording eight RBI including three home runs, which prompted management to call him back to the main squad a few days later. He continued to hit well in the following weeks, but did not really hit anything beyond the fence. In September however, he hit one home run after another, including 2 home runs in a single inning during the September 16 match against the Baystars, and a rare inside-the-park home run on September 27. This brought his total to 11, and he experienced his first season with double digit home runs.

Oyama finished the season at .274, with 48 RBI over 117 games. His improved performance earned him an additional 5 million yen pay raise, bringing his annual salary to 30 million yen.

==== 2019 ====
As with the previous year, Oyama played for the Samurai Japan in the 2019 exhibition games against Mexico. He was assigned the cleanup role (4th batter) in the season-opener against the Swallows, and continued in that role from then onwards. By June 20, he notched his 10th home run during the interleague games and became the first home-grown Hanshin player to hit double digit homers as cleanup since Osamu Hamanaka in 2003. As he fell into a slump in July however, the cleanup position was eventually assigned to the newly hired import Jefry Marté on August 10. He still continued to appear in the line up, but saw fewer plate appearances after that. Oyama managed to appear in all 143 games of the season, and despite topping the team in RBI and home runs (76 RBI, 14 home runs), he also topped both leagues in fielding errors (20) as a 3rd baseman. He also played in most of the games in the postseason Climax Series, and hit the winning home run on top of the 9th during Game 3 against the Yomiuri Giants, which turned out to be the team's only win in the final stage before getting eliminated. His season performance earned him a 17 million pay raise, which brought his annual salary to 47 million yen.

==== 2020 ====
Oyama had more competition for the infield positions this season with the entry of new import Justin Bour. And despite batting .378 in the pre-season games, he was benched for a few matches after the season opener as Jefry Marté played third base. Only after Marté suffered from an injury on July 4 did he become a regular in the lineup, and he continued to be the main clean-up man (4th batter) all throughout the pandemic-shortened season. Oyama suffered from a minor slump in August, but from then on, he continued to bat above .290. By early September, he surpassed his previous home run record of 14 and was even in the running for the league's home run king title. But despite his good hit production, Oyama did not manage a single home run for 18 straight matches in October and was overtaken for the title by three homers. He finished the year with a .288 average in 116 matches, and topped the team in RBI and home runs with 85 (3rd in league) and 28 (2nd in league) respectively. Oyama also finished 6th in the league in OPS with .918, and 2nd in slugging percentage with .560. He received a 53 million yen pay raise which more than doubled his previous salary for his best season performance yet. This made Oyama the 3rd home-grown player in Hanshin history to reach the 100 million yen pay bracket within five years from his debut (next to Shintaro Fujinami and Norihiro Akahoshi), and the quickest infielder to do so (beating Takashi Toritani with six years). He was also chosen as the team captain for the 2021 season.
