= Sekimoto =

Sekimoto (written: 関本) is a Japanese surname. Notable people with the surname include:

- Daisuke Sekimoto (関本 大介, born 1981), Japanese wrestler
- Ikuo Sekimoto (関本 郁夫, born 1942), Japanese film director and screenwriter
- Kentaro Sekimoto (関本 賢太郎, born 1978), Japanese baseball player
- Koichi Sekimoto (関本 恒一, born 1978), Japanese footballer
- Tadahiro Sekimoto (関本 忠弘, 1926–2007), Japanese engineer
