= Shiotani =

Shiotani (written: 塩谷 or 潮谷) is a Japanese surname. Notable people with the surname include:

- Kazuhiko Shiotani (塩谷 和彦, born 1974), Japanese baseball player
- Shinsuke Shiotani (塩谷 伸介, born 1970), Japanese footballer
- Teikō Shiotani (塩谷 定好, 1899–1988), Japanese photographer
- Tsukasa Shiotani (塩谷 司, born 1988), Japanese footballer
- Yoshiko Shiotani (潮谷 義子, born 1939), Japanese politician
