= Hironori Suguro =

Japanese baseball player and coach (born 1963)

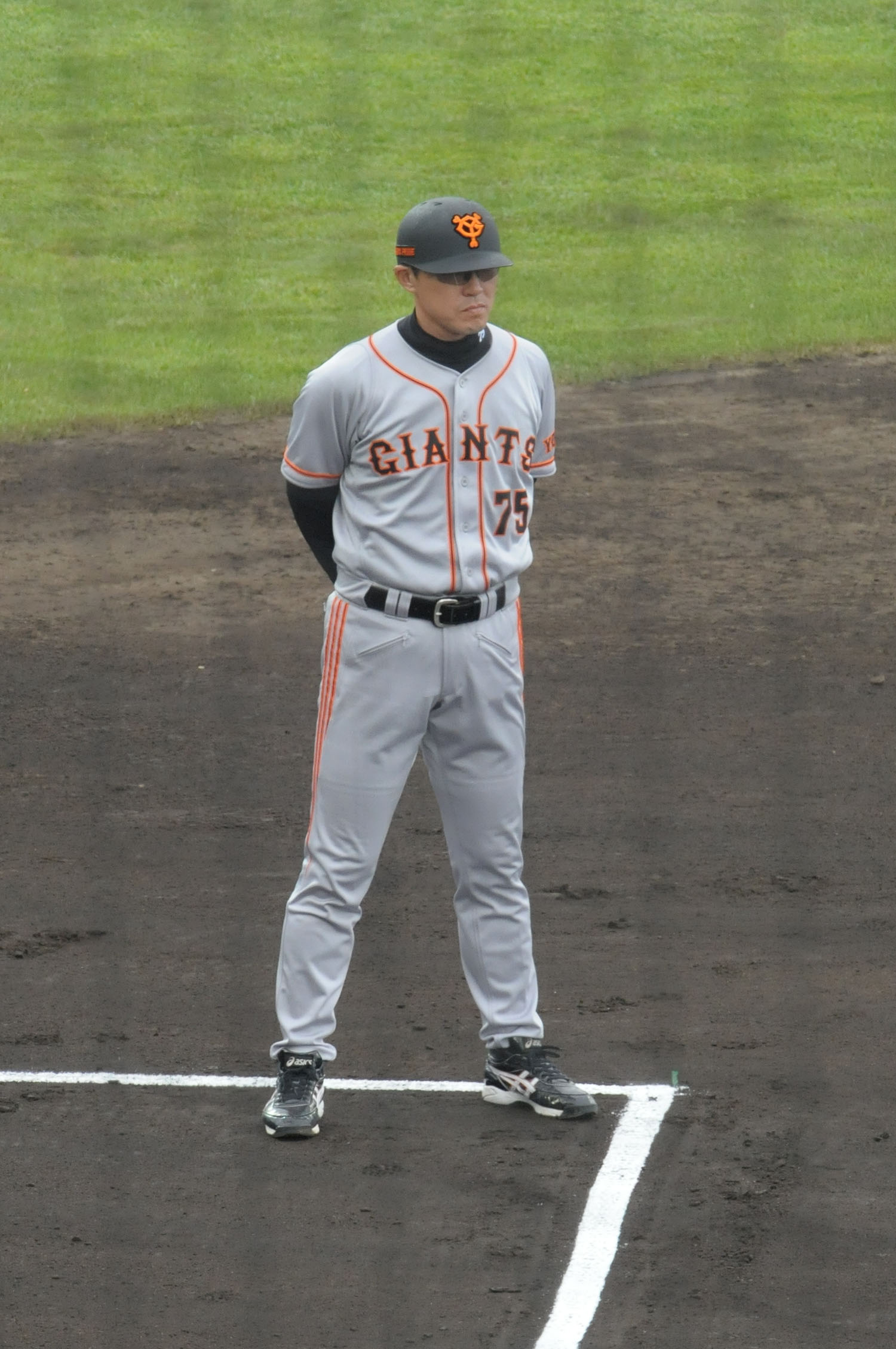
- Infielder / Coach
- Born: September 23, 1963 (age 62); Funabashi, Chiba
- Bats: Right Throws: Right

NPB debut
- April 23, 1988, for the Yomiuri Giants

NPB statistics (through 1999 season)
- Batting average: .242
- Hits: 346
- RBIs: 107
- Stats at Baseball Reference

Teams
- As player: Yomiuri Giants (1988 – 1991); Orix BlueWave (1992 – 1996); Kintetsu Buffaloes/Osaka Kintetsu Buffaloes (1997 – 1999); As coach: Osaka Kintetsu Buffaloes (2000 – 2002); Fukuoka Daiei Hawks/Fukuoka SoftBank Hawks (2003 – 2006); Shinano Grandserows (2007); Kagawa Olive Guyners (2008); Yomiuri Giants (2009 – 2015); Kōchi Fighting Dogs (2016); Orix Buffaloes (2017 – 2019)
- Last updated on: 13 January 2020

Hironori Suguro (勝呂 壽統, Suguro Hironori; born September 23, 1963) is a former Japanese professional baseball player. He was the number 5 draft pick for the Yomiuri Giants in 1987.
