= Tatsuya Shindoh =

Japanese baseball player and coach (born 1970)

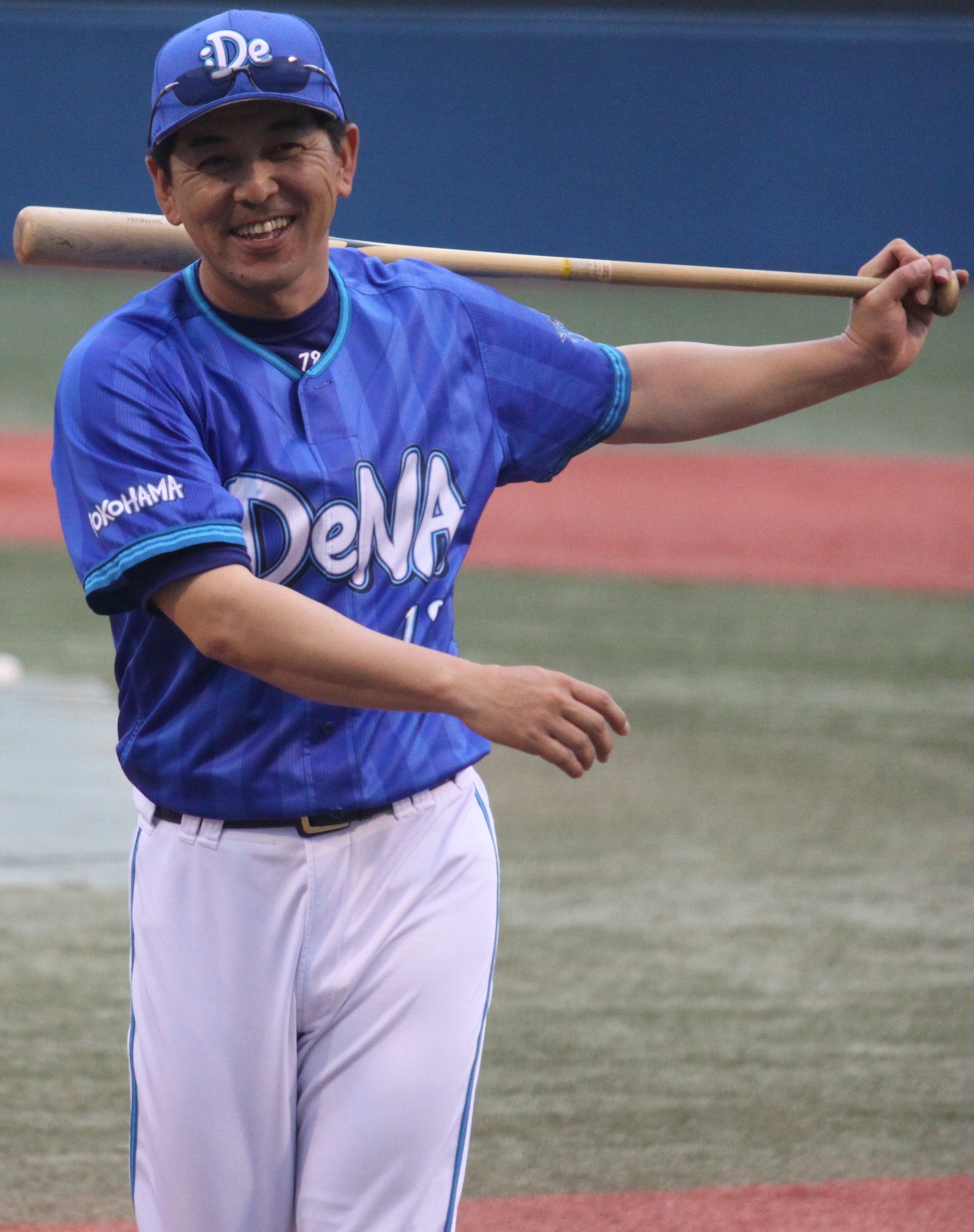

Yokohama DeNA BayStars – No. 78
- Infielder / Coach
- Born: January 14, 1970 (age 56); Takaoka, Toyama
- Batted: Right Threw: Right

NPB debut
- October 20, 1988, for the Yokohama Taiyō Whales

Last NPB appearance
- October 12, 2003, for the Orix BlueWave

NPB statistics (through 2003 season)
- Batting average: .239
- Hits: 917
- RBIs: 412
- Stats at Baseball Reference

Teams
- As player: Yokohama Taiyō Whales/Yokohama BayStars (1988–2000); Orix BlueWave (2001–2003); As manager: Toyama Thunderbirds (2012–2013); As coach: Yokohama BayStars/Yokohama DeNA BayStars (2004–2007, 2014–2016, 2025-); Toyama Thunderbirds (2010–2011)

Career highlights and awards
- 1× Japan Series champion (1998); 3× Pacific League Golden Glove Award (1997–1999)
- Last updated on: 30 December 2024

Tatsuya Shindoh (進藤 達哉, Shindoh Tatsuya; born January 14, 1970 in Takaoka, Toyama) is a former Japanese Nippon Professional Baseball player.
