= Hiroshi Shibahara =

Japanese baseball player (born 1974)

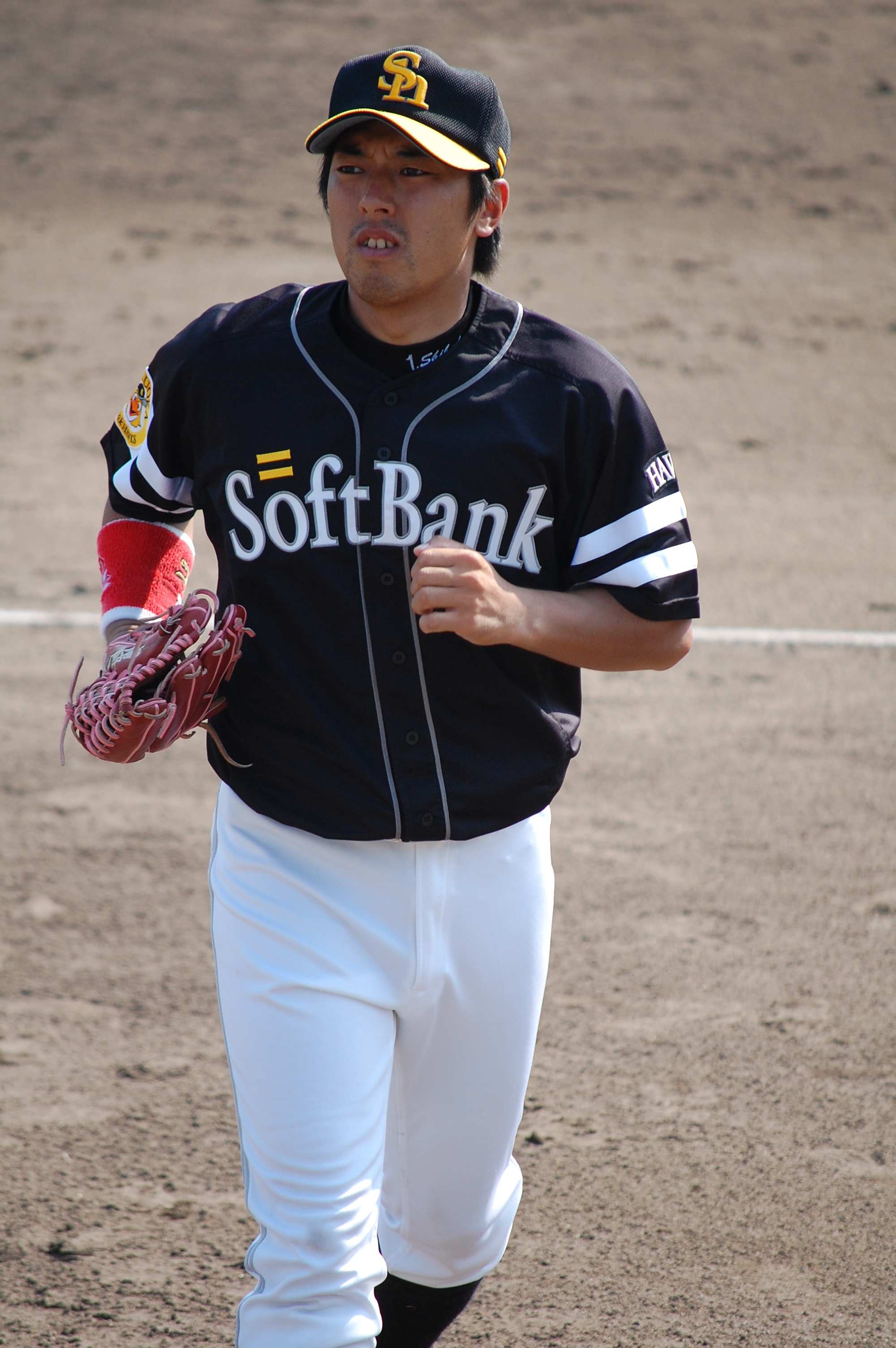
- Outfielder
- Born: May 23, 1974 (age 52); Kitakyushu, Fukuoka, Japan
- Batted: Left Threw: Left

NPB debut
- April 5, 1997, for the Fukuoka Daiei Hawks

Last appearance
- October 15, 2011, for the Fukuoka SoftBank Hawks

NPB statistics (through 2011 season)
- Batting average: .282
- Hits: 1,382
- Home runs: 54
- RBI: 463
- Stolen bases: 85
- Stats at Baseball Reference

Teams
- Fukuoka Daiei Hawks/Fukuoka SoftBank Hawks (1997–2011)

Career highlights and awards
- 2× Pacific League Best Nine Award (1998, 2000); 3× Pacific League Golden Glove Award (2000, 2001, 2003); 3× Japan Series champion (1999, 2003, 2011); 3× NPB All-Star (2000, 2001, 2006)
- Last updated on: 15 August 2020

Hiroshi Shibahara (柴原 洋, Shibahara Hiroshi; born May 23, 1974) is a Japanese professional baseball player. An outfielder, he is currently with the Fukuoka SoftBank Hawks in Japan's Nippon Professional Baseball.
