= Naoya Shimada =

Japanese baseball player and coach

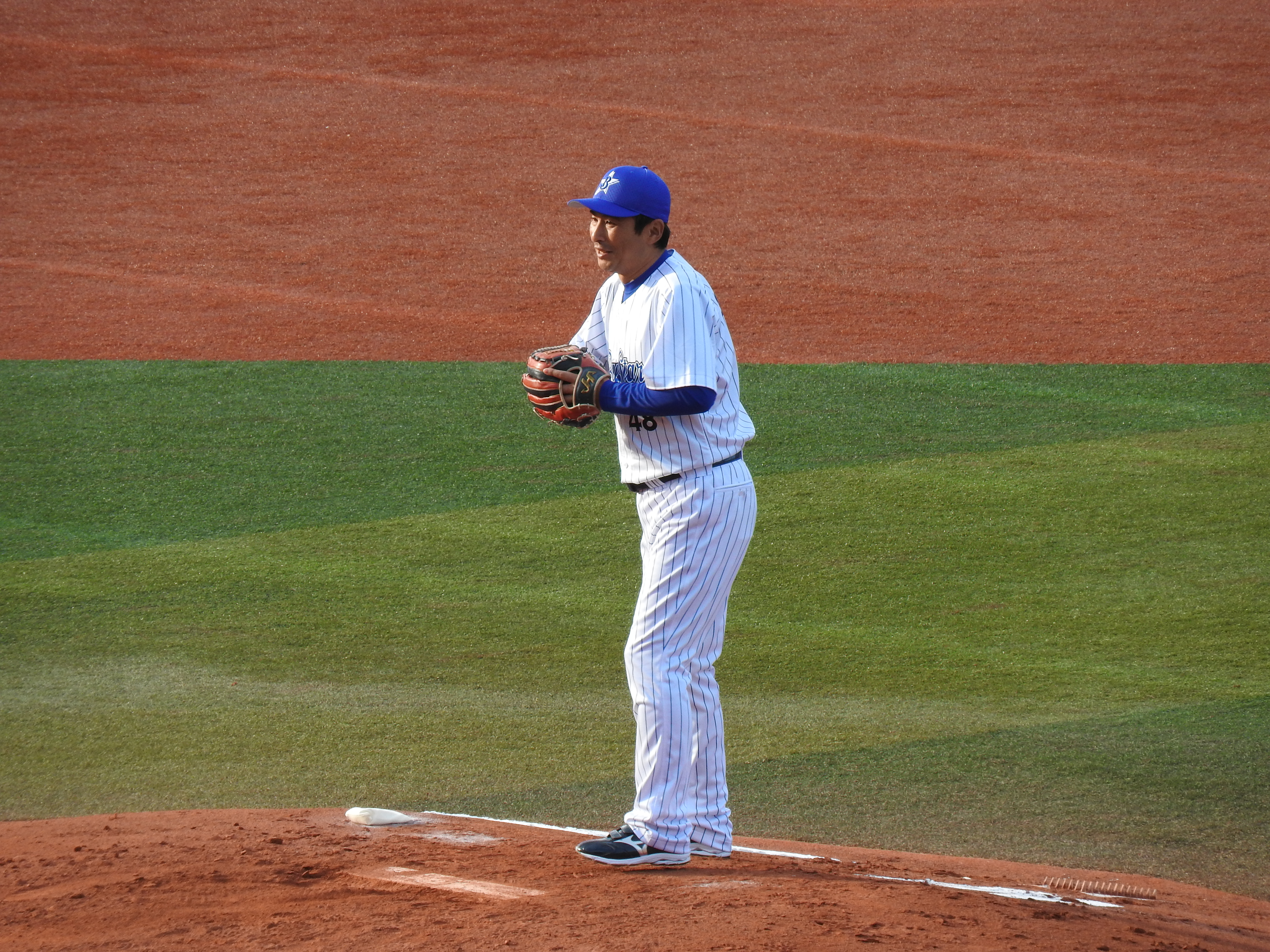
- Pitcher / Coach
- Born: March 17, 1970; Kashiwa, Chiba, Japan
- Batted: Right Threw: Right

NPB debut
- October 8, 1989, for the Nippon-Ham Fighters

Last appearance
- August 23, 2003, for the Osaka Kintetsu Buffaloes

NPB statistics (through 2003)
- Win–loss record: 39–38
- Earned run average: 3.69
- Strikeouts: 417
- Saves: 9

Teams
- As player: Nippon-Ham Fighters (1988–1991); Yokohama Taiyō Whales / Yokohama BayStars (1992–2000); Yakult Swallows (2001–2002); Osaka Kintetsu Buffaloes (2003); As manager: Tokushima Indigo Socks (2012–2014); As coach: Shinano Grandserows (2007–2010); Tokushima Indigo Socks (2011); Yokohama DeNA BayStars (2015–2017)

Career highlights and awards
- 1× Central League Most Valuable Setup Pitcher (1997); 1× NPB All-Star (1999); 2× Japan Series champion (1998, 2001)
- Last updated on: 9 May 2020

Naoya Shimada (島田 直也, Shimada Naoya; born March 17, 1970 in Kashiwa, Chiba, Japan) is a Japanese former Nippon Professional Baseball pitcher.
