= Kazumi Saito =

Japanese baseball player (born 1977)

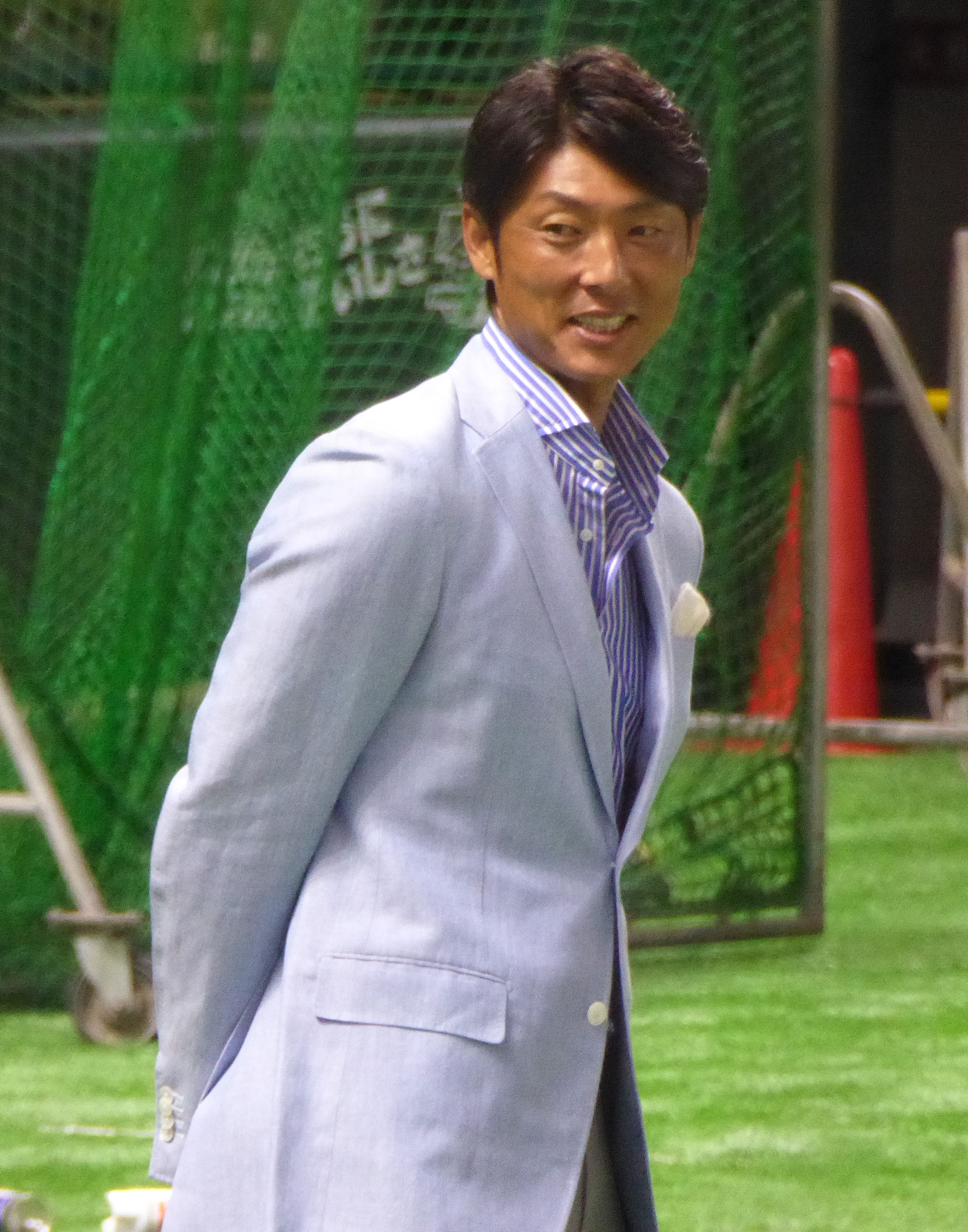

Fukuoka SoftBank Hawks – No. 011
- Starting pitcher / Coach / Manager
- Born: November 30, 1977 (age 48); Minami-ku, Kyoto, Japan
- Batted: Right Threw: Right

NPB debut
- October 5, 1997, for the Fukuoka Daiei Hawks

Last appearance
- September 27, 2007, for the Fukuoka SoftBank Hawks

NPB statistics
- Win–loss record: 79–23
- Earned run average: 3.33
- Strikeouts: 846
- Stats at Baseball Reference

Teams
- As player: Fukuoka Daiei Hawks/Fukuoka SoftBank Hawks (1996–2010); As coach / manager: Fukuoka SoftBank Hawks (2011–2013, 2023–present)

Career highlights and awards
- As player: Japanese Triple Crown (2006); 2x Eiji Sawamura Award winner (2003, 2006); 2x Best Nine Award winner (2003, 2006); 2x Most Valuable Battery (2003, 2006); 2x NPB All-Star (2003, 2006); As coach: Japan Series champion (2025)
- Last updated on: April 17, 2021

Kazumi Saito (斉藤 和巳, Saitō Kazumi; born November 30, 1977) is a Japanese former professional baseball starting pitcher, and current fourth squad manager for the Fukuoka SoftBank Hawks of Nippon Professional Baseball (NPB). He was a two-time winner of the Eiji Sawamura Award (2003, 2006), but did not pitch in a regular season game after October 2007 due to various shoulder injuries.

== Professional career ==
Saito was marked as a top prospect by NPB scouts from his days at South Kyoto High School. He along with the current Hiroshima Toyo Carp pitcher Masayuki Hasegawa and Saitama Seibu Lions pitcher Tomoki Hoshino were dubbed the "Big Three" of their particular age group. The Fukuoka Daiei Hawks (currently the Fukuoka SoftBank Hawks) selected Saito with their first-round pick in the 1995 NPB amateur draft.

=== Early years: 1996 to 2002 ===
While Saito made his first appearance at the ichigun (Japanese equivalent of "major league") level in 1997, just his second year in the pros, his development was often hindered by his proneness to injury. In particular, Saito was plagued by a chronically loose shoulder joint, a condition so troubling for pitchers that coaches even suggested switching positions and becoming a hitter (as evidence of this, he was once called upon to pinch-hit in a nigun ("minor league" or "farm team") game, playing left field in the next inning). However, Saito refused and insisted upon remaining a pitcher.

After undergoing surgery on his right shoulder and missing the entire 1998 season due to rehab, Saito finally posted his first win with the ichigun in 2000. He went on to win five games that season, four of which were after the All-Star break in the thick of the pennant race, but was not called upon to start in the Japan Series when the Hawks eventually won the league title.

Expectations were considerably higher for Saito going into the 2001 season, and many hoped that he would emerge as the Hawks' staff ace for the future. Unfortunately, he was plagued by a mysterious pain in his shoulder and ended up sidelined for virtually all of the season, failing to record a single win. On August 10, 2002, in a game against the Osaka Kintetsu Buffaloes, he got his first regular season win in two years, eventually finishing the season with a 4-1 record and a 2.94 ERA.

=== 2003 ===
Hawks manager Sadaharu Oh called Saito out in January prior to the 2003 season, saying, "Our ace [this year] is either Saito or [Hayato] Terahara." Saito was appointed the Opening Day starter for the first time in his career, taking the mound on March 28 against the Chiba Lotte Marines. Despite having only nine career wins up until that year, Saito had a phenomenal year, going 16–0 to start the season and later becoming the first 20-game winner in the Pacific League since Yoshinori Sato in 1985. Finishing the season with a 20–3 record, he led the league in wins and winning percentage (.870) and was tied for first in ERA (he and Daisuke Matsuzaka gave up the same number of earned runs in the same number of innings, posting identical ERAs of 2.83).

That year, then-Hanshin Tigers ace Kei Igawa had also posted 20 wins, making it the first time since 1982 that both Japanese leagues had produced 20-game winners. Incidentally, both pitchers received the Sawamura and Best Nine awards, making it also the first time that the Sawamura Award had ever been presented to two pitchers (one from the Central League, the other from the Pacific) in the same year. Saito led the Hawks to a Japan Series victory over Igawa's Tigers (the two faced each other in Game 1), marking their first championship since 1999.

=== 2004 ===
Saito was appointed Opening Day starter for the second consecutive year to begin the 2004 season. However, he struggled to find his groove, struggling so much that he was sent down to the minors by mid-April. Though Saito eventually came back up and managed to record 10 wins (amidst seven losses), his season ERA of 6.26 was the worst single-season ERA by any pitcher that had thrown at least as many innings as their team had played games in Japanese professional baseball history. He was also lit up by the Lions in the second stage of the Pacific League playoffs.

=== 2005 ===
In 2005, despite being named the Hawks' Opening Day starter during Spring training, recurring pains in his shoulder forced Saito to commit to rehab again (Tsuyoshi Wada started in his place). Nevertheless, he made his first start of the season on April 27 against the Hokkaido Nippon Ham Fighters, the first of a 15-game win streak that lasted until September 7 in a game against the Orix BlueWave. Not only did Saito become the first pitcher to win 15 consecutive games since Shibakuni Mashiba in 1981, he also became the first pitcher in NPB history to have multiple win streaks of 14 games or more (the first time he achieved this was in 2003). He finished the season at 16–1, leading the league in winning percentage (.941). However, he was rocked around yet again in the playoffs, failing to lead the Hawks to a league title.

=== 2006 ===
Saito asked to have his name dropped from the selection process for the Japanese national team that would play in the inaugural World Baseball Classic during 2006 Spring training, instead focusing on adjusting his mechanics so that they would conform to the new rules the NPB had decided to employ regarding pitching motions. Saito earned his first win of the season against the Marines on March 26, his third time pitching on Opening Day.

On June 8, in an interleague game against the Yomiuri Giants, Saito pitched a one-hit complete game shutout, the lone hit being an infield single by Ryota Wakiya. Not only that, Saito managed to pick off Wakiya while he was leading off of first base, facing only the minimum 27 hitters in the win in what could be described as a "semi-perfect game".

Saito had a particularly dominant month of August, pitching two shutouts en route to a 5–0 record for the month. He finished the season with an 18–5 record, 205 strikeouts and an astonishing 1.75 ERA, thus leading the league in all three Triple Crown categories (wins, strikeouts, ERA) as well as winning percentage and shutouts (the first pitcher since Suguru Egawa in 1981 to lead the league in all five categories). Saito was the unanimous pick for the Sawamura Award (his second), and although the Most Valuable Player award went to then-Fighters first baseman Michihiro Ogasawara, Saito actually collected more first-place votes. He also won his second Best Nine Award.

Saito pitched in Game 1 of the first stage of the Pacific League playoffs against the Lions on October 7 and Game 2 of the second stage against the Fighters on October 12, pitching on four days' rest for the first time in six years. While he gave up just two runs in 16 2/3 combined innings, the Hawks were shut out 1–0 in both games, the former by Daisuke Matsuzaka, the latter by Fighters left-hander Tomoya Yagi. After the Fighters scored the game-winning run off him in the ninth inning of the latter game, Saito could no longer contain his frustration, falling to the ground in tears as teammates Julio Zuleta and Jolbert Cabrera helped him off the mound.

=== 2007 ===
In 2007, Saito took the mound for the Hawks on Opening Day (March 24) against the Orix Buffaloes, the second straight year he was appointed Opening Day starter and the fourth time he was given that role overall. However, he took a no-decision in the loss, and struggled in the first few weeks of the season. On April 26, Saito was sent to the minors for rehab yet again, this time due to muscle fatigue. He did not return until July 10, in a game against the Tohoku Rakuten Golden Eagles, and did not put up his first win of the season until two weeks later against the Marines in the first game after the All-Star break. Following this game, the team decided to use Saito on a special schedule in which he would throw no more than 100 pitches in one outing and get 10 days of rest in between every start. He made just 12 starts for the season, finishing with a 6–3 record and 2.74 ERA in 72 1/3 innings.

On October 8, he took the mound for Game 1 of the Climax Series (as the playoffs were now named) against the Marines. It was his tenth attempt at his first win in the playoffs (excluding the Japan Series), but he could not shut down the Marines offense and the Hawks went on to lose in the first stage yet again. Little did anyone know that this would be the last time Saitoh pitched as a professional.

=== 2008–2013: Injury woes and retirement ===
Saito traveled to the United States in January prior to the 2008 season to have endoscopic rotator cuff surgery on his right shoulder, which had worsened over time due to accumulate fatigue. The diagnosis following the surgery revealed that he would need to sit out the entire season to rehabilitate his shoulder. Saito returned to Japan in September and announced that he would begin to work towards being able to pitch in the season opener of the following season.

Saito spent much of January 2009 in Arizona as part of his rehab effort, hoping to be ready in time for the upcoming regular season, but his shoulder recovery did not progress as planned. He began the regular season with the ni-gun team. Despite being with the ni-gun team, Saito did not pitch in 2009, leading some to wonder if his career was over.

On January 31, 2010, the Hawks announced that Saito would be undergoing another surgical procedure on his right rotator cuff on February 2, his third operation on the shoulder in his career. He did not pitch for the third consecutive year, although he did play catch on October 4 for the first time since January, before his surgery. Saito had hoped to be ready for the 2011 season, but ultimately did not pitch for the fourth consecutive year. He was, however, offered a contract as a conditioning coach, one that he accepted.

On July 29, 2013, Saito stepped down as rehab coach, ending his comeback bid and announcing his retirement.

On October 31, 2022, The Fukuoka SoftBank Hawks have announced that he will be their Pitching coach from the 2023 season.

On December 2, 2023, he was transferred to the fourth squad manager.

== Pitching style ==
Saito is a 192 cm (6 ft 4 in), 97 kg (214 lb) right-handed power pitcher. He has an overhand arm slot in a drop-and-drive motion that makes full use of his lower body, somewhat unusual for a pitcher of his height.

Sait's repertoire included 142 to 148 km/h (88 to 92 mph) four-seam fastball that routinely reached 152 km/h (94 mph) in his prime as well as an above-average splitter, an occasional curveball, and a slider. He often used the splitter, a pitch with a hard 12-to-6 break that had been clocked as fast as 146 km/h (91 mph), as his out pitch.

== Personal life ==
Saito married television personality and singer Suzanne in December 2011. Their first child, a son, was born in January 2014. However, only a year later, after their son's birth, on March 17, 2015, Suzanne and Saito jointly announced through their respective official blogs that he and Suzanne had decided to divorce, citing their busy work schedules as the cause of the divorce, though the two promised to co-parent their son and to continue to support each other as friends.

== Career statistics ==
Nippon Professional Baseball
| Year | Age | Team | W | L | W% | GS | CG | SHO | IP | H | R | ER | HR | BB | K | ERA | WHIP | LgERA |
|---|---|---|---|---|---|---|---|---|---|---|---|---|---|---|---|---|---|---|
| 1996 | 18 | Daiei | No appearances at major league level | | | | | | | | | | | | | | | 3.72 |
| 1997 | 19 | Daiei | 0 | 0 | ---- | 0 | 0 | 0 | 0.2 | 2 | 2 | 2 | 0 | 1 | 1 | 27.00 | 4.50 | 3.88 |
| 1998 | 20 | Daiei | 0 | 0 | ---- | 0 | 0 | 0 | 3.2 | 6 | 3 | 3 | 0 | 3 | 1 | 7.36 | 2.45 | 3.92 |
| 1999 | 21 | Daiei | 0 | 0 | ---- | 0 | 0 | 0 | 1.0 | 1 | 2 | 2 | 0 | 0 | 3 | 18.00 | 1.00 | 3.90 |
| 2000 | 22 | Daiei | 5 | 2 | .714 | 16 | 0 | 0 | 89.1 | 92 | 44 | 41 | 9 | 46 | 77 | 4.13 | 1.54 | 4.40 |
| 2001 | 23 | Daiei | 0 | 1 | .000 | 3 | 1 | 0 | 22.1 | 28 | 11 | 11 | 4 | 11 | 16 | 4.43 | 1.75 | 4.37 |
| 2002 | 24 | Daiei | 4 | 1 | .800 | 10 | 0 | 0 | 70.1 | 53 | 24 | 23 | 4 | 21 | 63 | 2.94 | 1.05 | 3.69 |
| 2003 | 25 | Daiei | **20** | 3 | **.870** | 26 | 5 | 1 | 194.0 | 174 | 62 | 61 | 19 | 66 | 160 | **2.83** | 1.24 | 4.64 |
| 2004 | 26 | Daiei | 10 | 7 | .588 | 22 | 3 | 1 | 138.0 | 139 | **100** | **96** | 22 | 59 | 120 | 6.26 | 1.43 | 4.68 |
| 2005 | 27 | SoftBank | 16 | 1 | **.941** | 22 | 4 | 1 | 157.0 | 135 | 54 | 51 | 14 | 41 | 129 | 2.92 | 1.12 | 4.06 |
| 2006 | 28 | SoftBank | **18** | 5 | **.783** | 26 | 8 | **5** | 201.0 | 147 | 50 | 39 | 10 | 46 | **205** | **1.75** | 0.96 | 3.62 |
| 2007 | 29 | SoftBank | 6 | 3 | .667 | 12 | 0 | 0 | 72.1 | 64 | 22 | 22 | 3 | 35 | 71 | 2.74 | 1.23 | 3.57 |

Bold indicates league leader; statistics current as of May 11, 2011
