= Julio Zuleta =

Panamanian baseball player (born 1975)

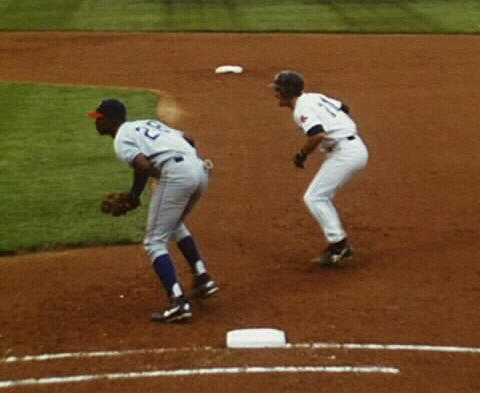
- Zuleta (left) with the Rockford Cubbies in 1997
- First baseman
- Born: March 28, 1975 (age 50); Panama City, Panama
- Batted: Right Threw: Right

Professional debut
- MLB: April 6, 2000, for the Chicago Cubs
- NPB: June 23, 2006, for the Fukuoka Daiei Hawks

Last appearance
- MLB: June 25, 2001, for the Chicago Cubs
- NPB: October 1, 2008, for the Chiba Lotte Marines

MLB statistics
- Batting average: .247
- Home runs: 9
- Runs batted in: 36

NPB statistics
- Batting average: .279
- Home runs: 145
- Runs batted in: 417
- Stats at Baseball Reference

Teams
- Chicago Cubs (2000–2001); Fukuoka Daiei Hawks / Fukuoka SoftBank Hawks (2003–2006); Chiba Lotte Marines (2007–2008)

Career highlights and awards
- Japan Series champion (2003); 2x All-Star (2004, 2005); Best Nine Award (2005)

Julio Ernesto Zuleta Tapia (born March 28, 1975) is a Panamanian former professional baseball player. He played parts of two seasons in Major League Baseball, from 2000 to 2001, for the Chicago Cubs, and six seasons in Nippon Professional Baseball from 2003 to 2008, primarily as a first baseman.

Zuleta graduated from the Colegio Javier in Panama City and speaks five languages: Spanish, French, English and Japanese. He is 197 cm (6 ft 6 in) tall and weighs 113 kg (249 lb).

== Playing career ==
=== Chicago Cubs ===
He was signed as a free agent by the Chicago Cubs on September 15, 1992 and spent a year with the Gulf Coast League Cubs in 1993. He began 1994 in Huntington before going back down to play with the GCL Cubs. Zuleta made his major league debut with the Cubs in 2000, ultimately playing in 30 games, hitting .294 with 3 home runs and 20 hits overall. Overall, in two MLB seasons (2000, 2001) with the Cubs, Zuleta posted a .247 batting average (43-for-174) with 9 home runs and 36 RBI in 79 games played.

=== Japan ===
Zuleta began playing professional baseball in Japan in 2003 with the Fukuoka SoftBank Hawks. His best year with the Hawks came in 2005, when he hit 43 home runs with a .319 batting average. He holds the Hawks club record for most home runs by a foreigner. From 2004 to 2006, he hit the most home runs in the league (109) over the three-year span.

After the 2006 season, Zuleta was released by the Hawks and signed with the Chiba Lotte Marines as a free agent. He signed a two-year contract with the Marines. During the 2007 season, Zuleta was hit by a pitch which broke his finger. He continued to play for several months and led the team in home runs with 15 home runs. On September 22, 2007, in a game against the Rakuten Golden Eagles, he became the 61st player in Japanese professional baseball history to hit for the cycle.

During the 2008 season, Zuleta spent most of the season deactivated for various reasons, which has been a point of controversy. On June 7, 2008, he blasted a hit on the roof light in Tokyo Dome and was given a ground-rule home run, becoming only the second player to ground a home run in the dome beside Ralph Bryant.

Awards 2005: Best Nine (1st Base) June, 2005: Monthly MVP Records NPB Firsts First game: June 23, 2003 vs. Nippon Ham Fighters (16th meetup at Fukuoka Dome), batted #8 starting in right field First AB, first Hit: Same as above, bottom of 2nd, no outs, Masato Yoshizaki on the mound - line drive off the center field fence for a double First RBI: June 24, 2003 vs. Nippon Ham (17th meetup at Fukuoka Dome), bottom of 6th inning with one out against Akio Shimizu on the mound First home run: July 1, 2003 vs. Osaka Kintetsu Buffaloes (16th meetup at Osaka Dome), top of 5th inning with nobody out, a solo shot to left off of Shogo Yamamoto First stolen base: June 7, 2004 vs. Nippon Ham Fighters (13th meetup at Tokyo Dome) stole second in the top of the 6th inning off of Tomokazu Iba on the mound and Shinji Takahashi behind the plate Other Records and Milestones 100th home run: May 6, 2006 vs. Seibu Lions (7th meetup at Invoice Seibu Dome) 4th inning with 2 hours against Fumiya Nishiguchi, a 3 run come from behind (gyakuten) home run to left field [24th player in NPB history to hit 100 home runs] All Star Games: 2004 and 2005 Hit home runs off of all NPB teams played against: April 1, 2007 vs. Fukuoka SoftBank Hawks (3rd meetup at Chiba Marine Stadium) in the bottom of the 8th inning, a solo shot to center against Yoshiaki Fujioka [6th player in NPB history to do so] Includes home runs against the Osaka Kintetsu Buffaloes which ceased to exist in 2004, becoming the 2nd player to hit home runs against 13 teams Hit for the cycle: September 22, 2007 vs. Tohoku Rakuten Golden Eagles (22nd meetup at Fullcast Stadium Miyagi) [61st player in NPB history to hit for the cycle] 2nd inn: G1, 4th inn: Double, 6th inn: Triple, 7th inn: HR, 9th inn: Single

Zuleta was released by the Marines after the 2008 season, though he had previously chosen to play for Panama at the 2009 World Baseball Classic.

The Japanese fans gave Zuleta the name "Samurai" because of his perseverance. He was a three-time All Star. He is one of only three players in Japanese baseball to hit three home runs in one game. He achieved this feat twice: once against the Orix BlueWave (2003) and another time against the Seibu Lions (2006). Zuleta also homered against 13 different Japanese teams; the only other player to have done so was Fernando Seguignol.

== Post-playing career ==
In 2009, Zuleta founded Zuleta's Indoor Batting Cages in Fort Myers, Florida, providing an upscale indoor facility for baseball and softball training and instruction, which he later sold in 2012.
