= Tadaharu Sakai =

Japanese baseball player and coach

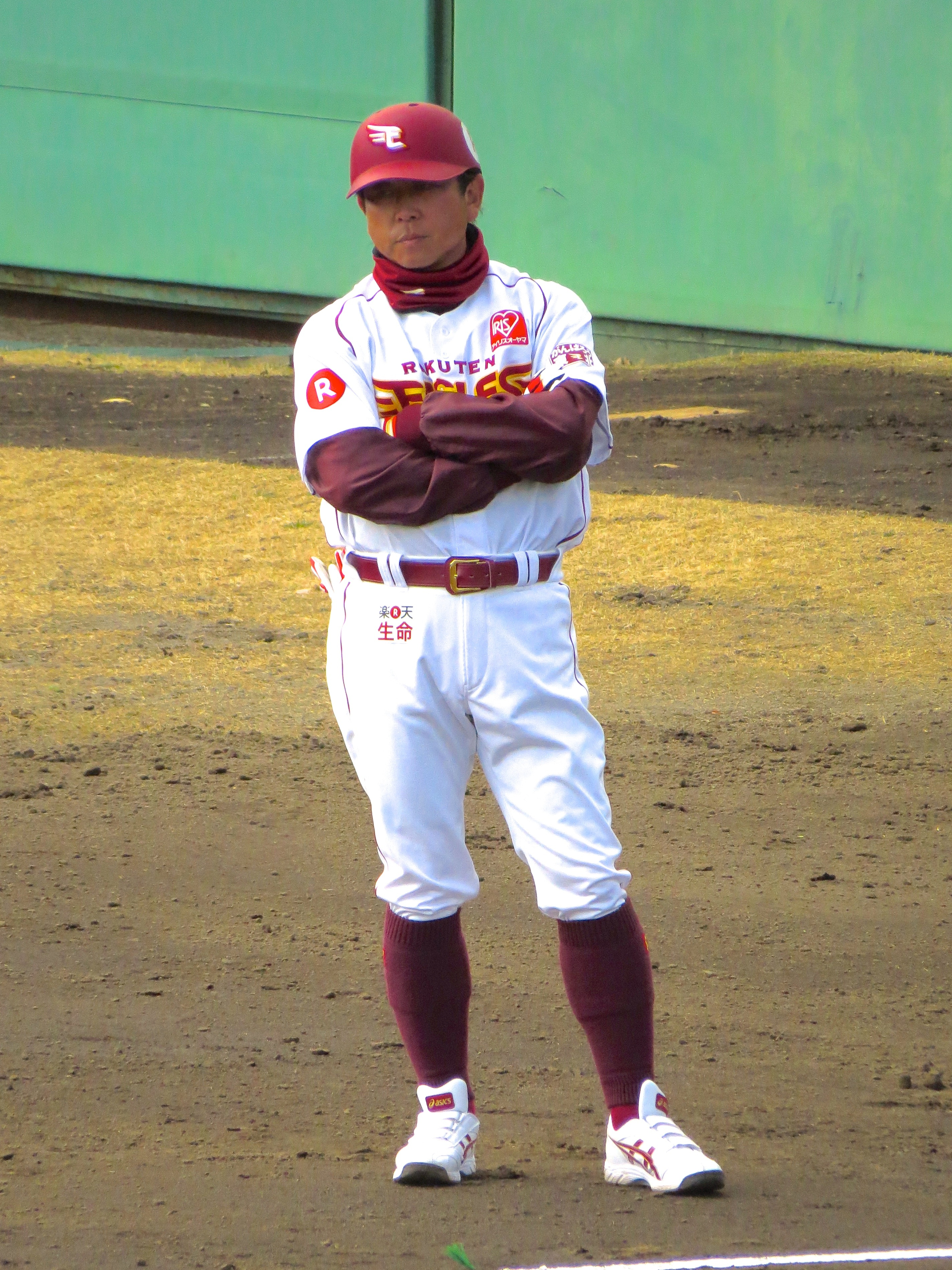

Fubon Guardians
- Infielder / Coach
- Born: June 21, 1970; Misato, Saitama, Japan
- Batted: Right Threw: Right

NPB debut
- April 30, 1990, for the Chunichi Dragons

Last appearance
- June 15, 2006, for the Tohoku Rakuten Golden Eagles

NPB statistics (through 2006)
- Batting average: .248
- Hits: 517
- Home runs: 12
- Runs batted in: 181
- Stolen base: 13

Teams
- As player: Chunichi Dragons (1989–1995, 2003–2004); Chiba Lotte Marines (1996–2002); Tohoku Rakuten Golden Eagles (2005–2006); As manager: Fukui Miracle Elephants (2012–2014); As coach: Tohoku Rakuten Golden Eagles (2015–2021); Fubon Guardians (2026–})
- Last updated on: January 3, 2022

Tadaharu Sakai (酒井 忠晴, Sakai Tadaharu; born June 21, 1970 in Misato, Saitama, Japan) is a Japanese former Nippon Professional Baseball infielder.
