= Katsunori Okamoto =

Japanese baseball player and coach

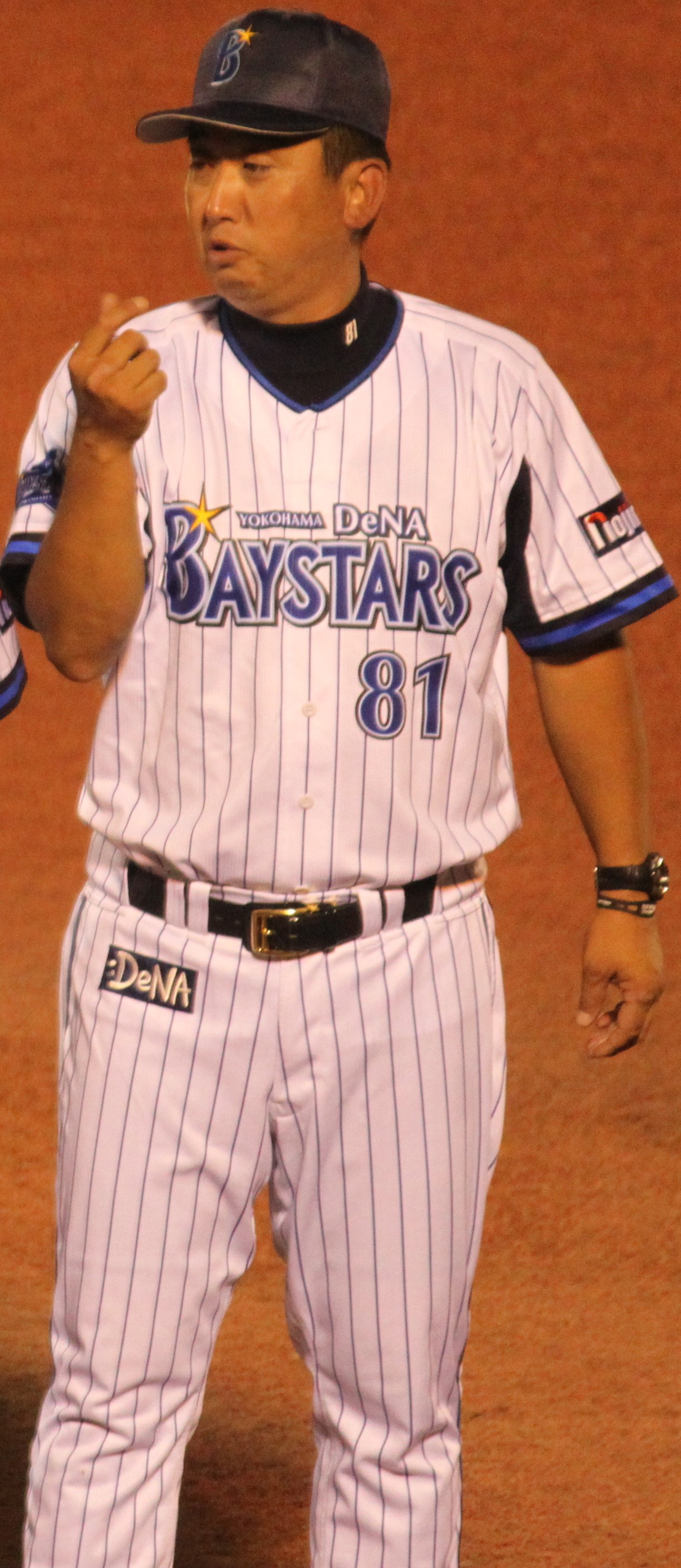
- Pitcher / Coach
- Born: June 9, 1973; Osaka, Osaka, Japan
- Batted: Right Threw: Right

NPB debut
- April 5, 1997, for the Fukuoka Daiei Hawks

Last appearance
- May 21, 2005, for the Fukuoka SoftBank Hawks

NPB statistics (through 2006)
- Win–loss record: 17–16
- Earned run average: 2.98
- Strikeouts: 298
- Saves: 51

Teams
- As player: Fukuoka Daiei Hawks / Fukuoka SoftBank Hawks (1997–2006); As manager: Shinano Grandserows (2015); As coach: Nagasaki Saints (2008); Kagawa Olive Guyners (2009); Yokohama BayStars / Yokohama DeNA BayStars (2010–2014)

Career highlights and awards
- 2× Japan Series champion (1999, 2003)
- Last updated on: 9 May 2020

Katsunori Okamoto (岡本 克道, Okamoto Katsunori; born June 9, 1973) is a Japanese former Nippon Professional Baseball pitcher.
