= Yusuke Torigoe =

Japanese baseball player and coach (born 1971)

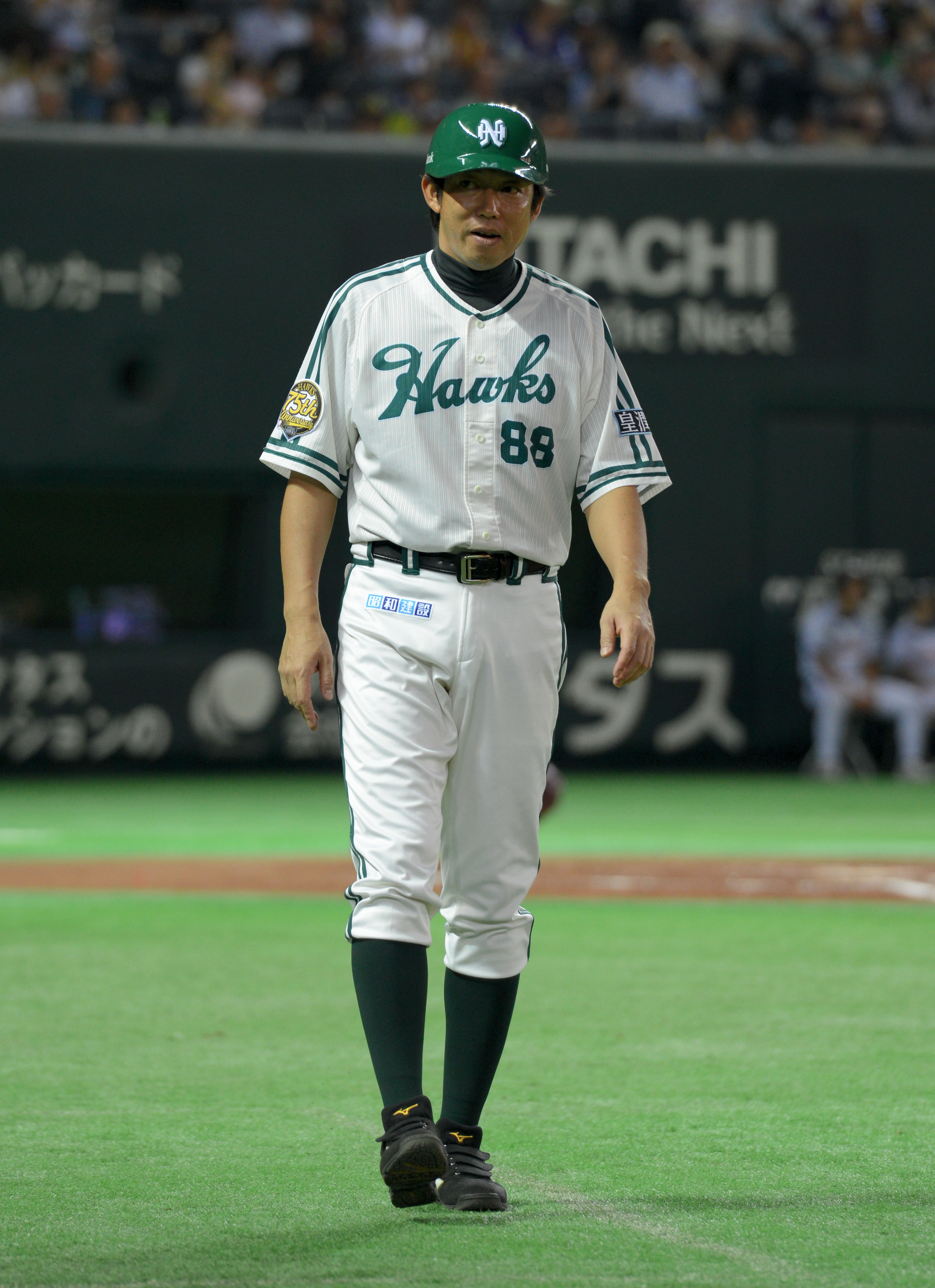
- Torigoe with the Fukuoka SoftBank Hawks

Saitama Seibu Lions – No. 91
- Infielder / Coach
- Born: July 1, 1971 (age 54); Usuki, Ōita, Japan
- Batted: Right Threw: Right

NPB debut
- July 24, 1994, for the Chunichi Dragons

Last NPB appearance
- July 29, 2006, for the Fukuoka SoftBank Hawks

NPB statistics (through 2006)
- Batting average: .226
- Home runs: 21
- Hits: 504

Teams
- As player: Chunichi Dragons (1994–1999); Fukuoka Daiei Hawks/Fukuoka SoftBank Hawks (1999–2006); As coach: Fukuoka SoftBank Hawks (2007–2017); Chiba Lotte Marines (2018–2022); Saitama Seibu Lions (2025–)

Career highlights and awards
- 2× Japan Series champion (1999, 2003)
- Last updated on: 16 November 2024

Yusuke Torigoe (鳥越 裕介, Torigoe Yusuke; born July 1, 1971 in Usuki, Ōita, Japan), nicknamed "Usuki", is a former Nippon Professional Baseball infielder.
