= Makoto Shiozaki =

Japanese baseball player (born 1973)

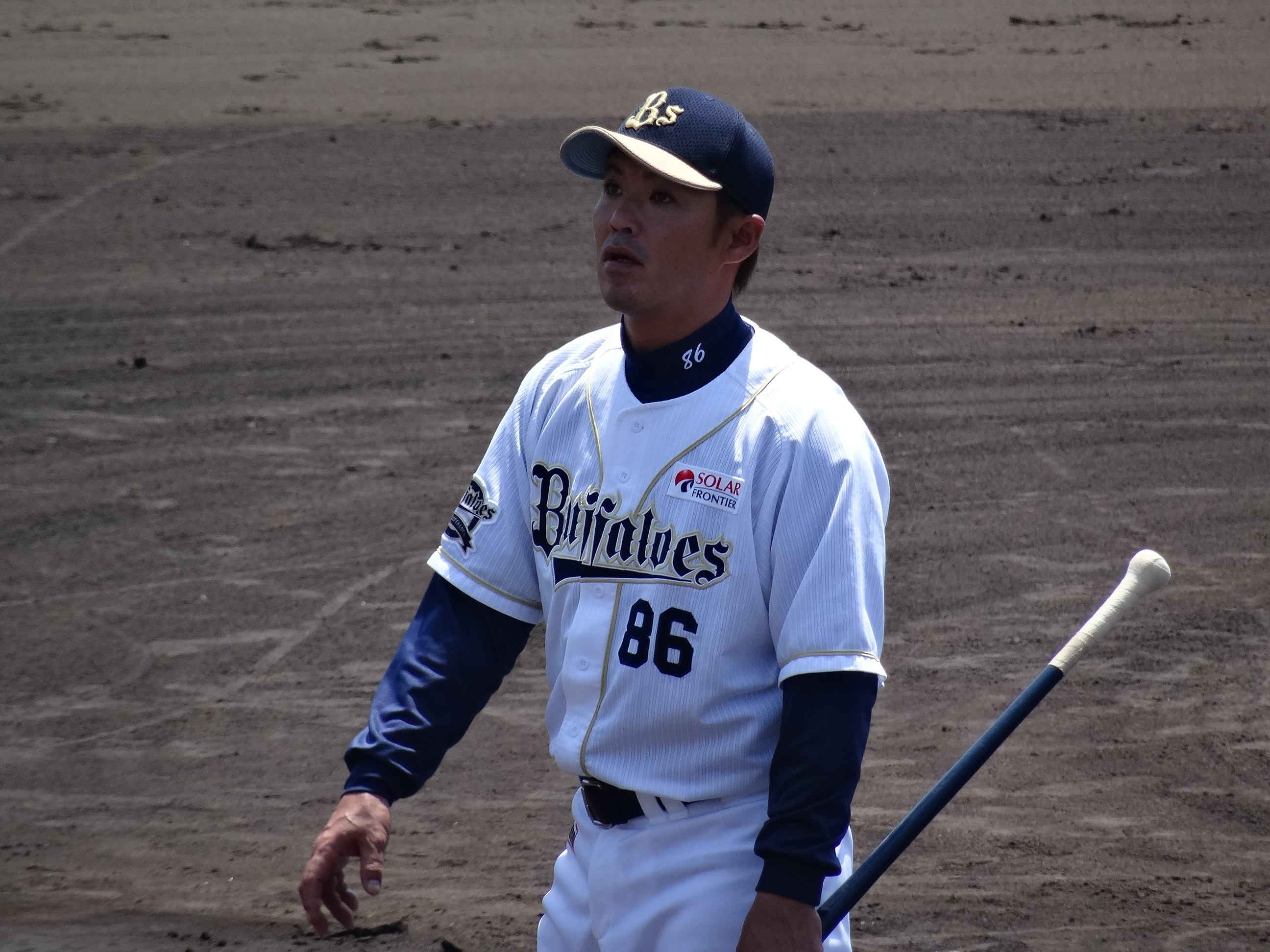
- Infielder / Coach
- Born: June 29, 1973 (age 52); Yatsushiro, Kumamoto
- Bats: Right Throws: Right

NPB debut
- April 9, 1997, for the Orix BlueWave

NPB statistics (through 2010 season)
- Batting average: .258
- Hits: 820
- RBIs: 261
- Stats at Baseball Reference

Teams
- As player: Orix BlueWave/Orix Buffaloes (1997 – 2010); As coach: Orix Buffaloes (2011 – 2016)
- Last updated on: 17 June 2018

Makoto Shiozaki (塩崎 真, Shiozaki Makoto; born June 29, 1973) is a former Japanese professional baseball player. He was the number 3 draft pick for the Orix BlueWave in 1997.
