= Yutaka Sudo =

Japanese baseball player, coach and manager (born 1937)

Yutaka Sudō
- Second baseman
- Born: 21 April 1937; Aki, Kōchi, Japan
- Batted: Right Threw: Right

NPB debut
- march 21, 1960, for the Mainichi Orions

Last NPB appearance
- October 10, 1968, for the Yomiuri Giants

NPB statistics
- Batting average: .230
- Home runs: 8
- RBIs: 143
- Hits: 495
- Stolen bases: 42
- Sacrifice bunts: 51

Teams
- As player: Mainichi Orions/Daimai Orions (1956–1961); Yomiuri Giants (1962–1968); As manager: Yokohama Taiyō Whales (1990–1992); As coach: Yomiuri Giants (1969–1975, 1983–1989, 1993–1995, 2004); Yokohama Taiyō Whales (1980–1981); Seibu Lions (1997–1999)

Yutaka Sudō (須藤 豊, Sudō Yutaka; born April 21, 1937, in Aki, Kōchi, Japan) is a Japanese former Nippon Professional Baseball infielder. He played for the Mainichi Orions, Daimai Orions and Yomiuri Giants. He later managed the Yokohama Taiyō Whales from 1990 to 1992.
