= Makoto Yoshino =

Japanese baseball player

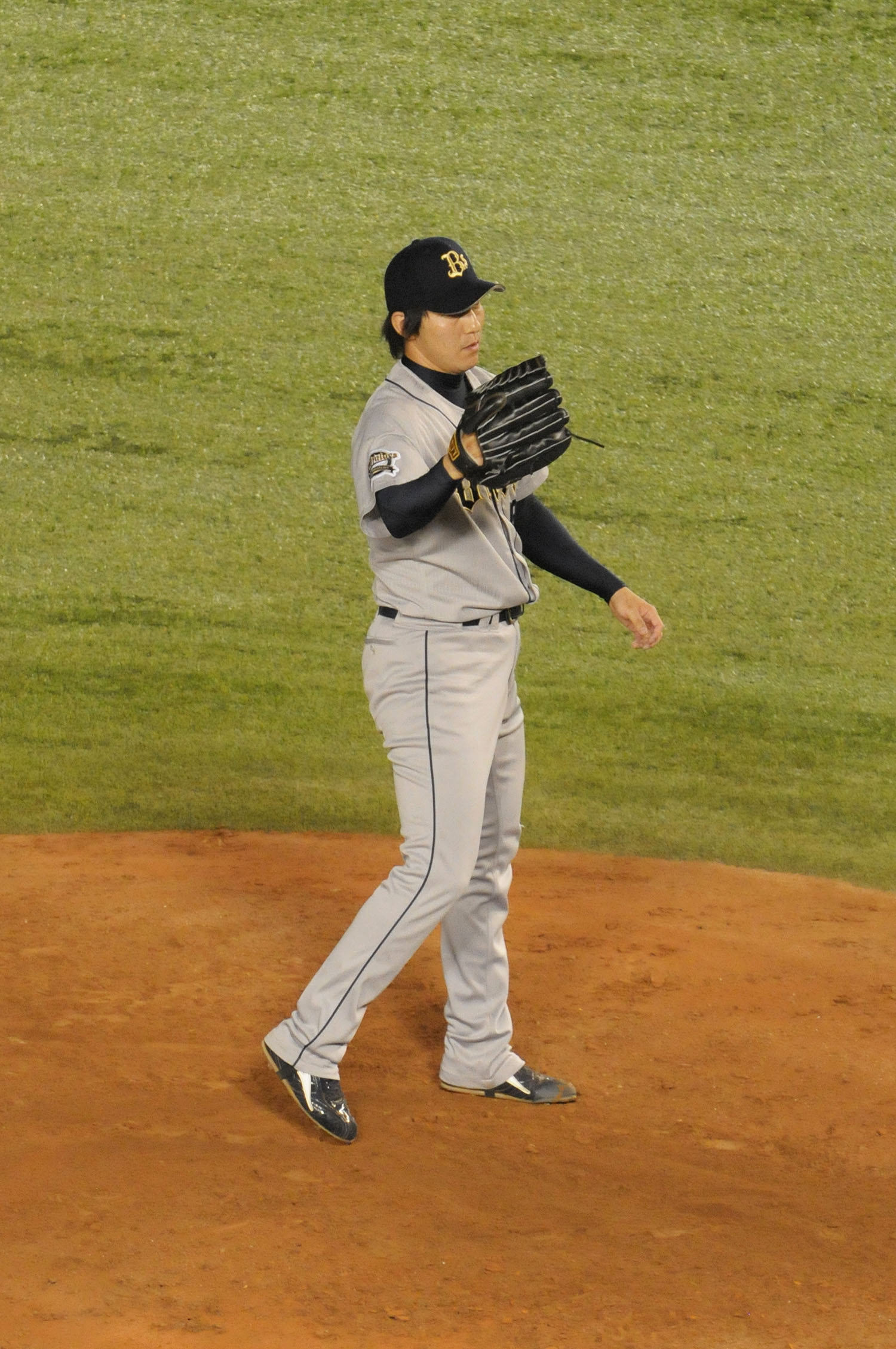
- Pitcher
- Born: November 19, 1977 (age 48)
- Bats: Left Throws: Left

NPB debut
- 2000, for the Hanshin Tigers

NPB statistics (through 2013)
- Win–loss record: 4–11
- ERA: 3.91
- Strikeouts: 197
- Stats at Baseball Reference

Teams
- Hanshin Tigers (2000–2007); Orix Buffaloes (2008–2013)

Makoto Yoshino (吉野 誠, born November 19, 1977) is a Japanese former professional baseball pitcher in Nippon Professional Baseball. He played for the Hanshin Tigers from 2000 to 2007 and the Orix Buffaloes from 2008 to 2013.
