= Shogo Saitoh =

Japanese baseball player (born 1989)

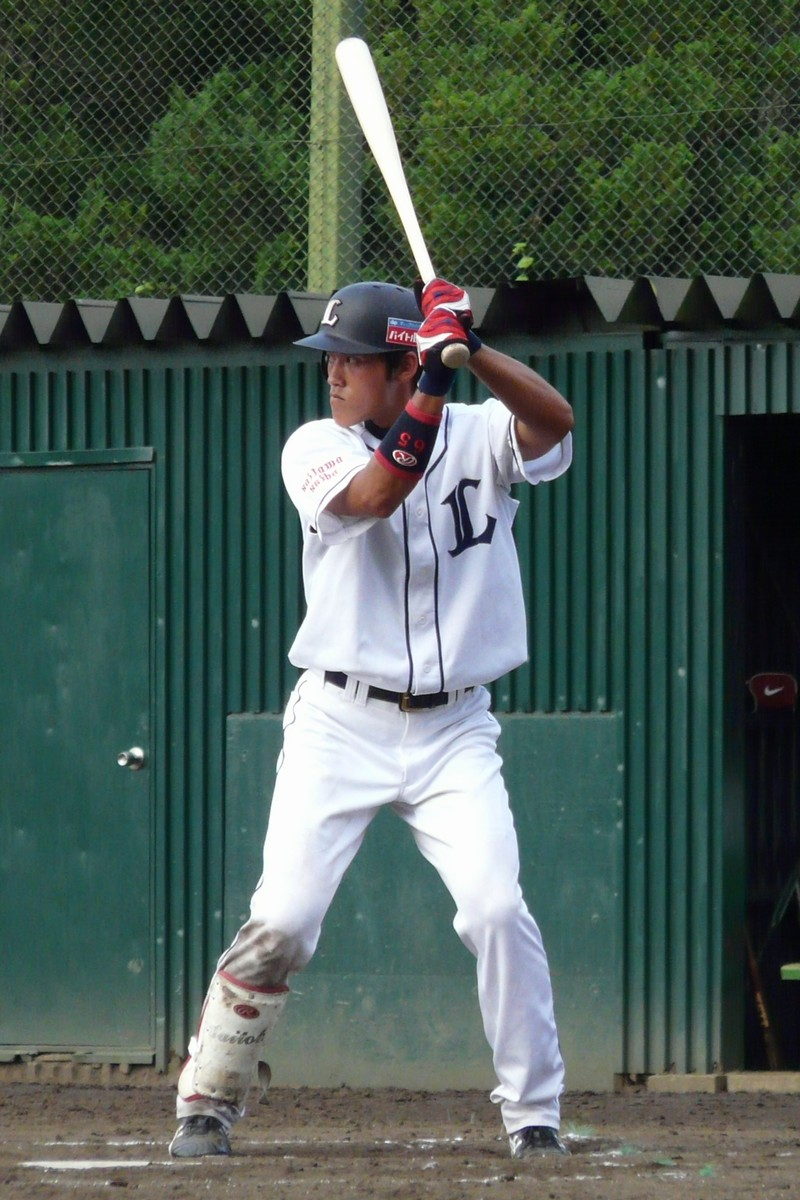
- Saitoh with the Saitama Seibu Lions
- Outfielder
- Born: May 14, 1989 (age 37)
- Bats: Left Throws: Left

NPB debut
- May 26, 2010, for the Saitama Seibu Lions

NPB statistics (through 2016 season)
- Batting average: .222
- Home runs: 4
- RBI: 16
- Stats at Baseball Reference

Teams
- Saitama Seibu Lions (2008–2019)

Shogo Saitoh (斉藤 彰吾, born May 14, 1989, in Kasukabe, Saitama) is a Japanese professional baseball outfielder for the Saitama Seibu Lions in Japan's Nippon Professional Baseball.
