= Pedro Valdés =

Puerto Rican baseball player (born 1973)

- Outfielder
- Born: June 29, 1973 (age 52); Fajardo, Puerto Rico
- Batted: Left Threw: Left

Professional debut
- MLB: May 15, 1996, for the Chicago Cubs
- NPB: March 24, 2001, for the Fukuoka Daiei Hawks
- KBO: 2007, for the LG Twins

Last appearance
- MLB: October 1, 2000, for the Texas Rangers
- NPB: October 11, 2004, for the Fukuoka Daiei Hawks
- KBO: September 18, 2007, for the LG Twins

MLB statistics
- Batting average: .247
- Home runs: 1
- Runs batted in: 8

NPB statistics
- Batting average: .302
- Home runs: 86
- Runs batted in: 335

KBO statistics
- Batting average: .283
- Home runs: 13
- Runs batted in: 72
- Stats at Baseball Reference

Teams
- Chicago Cubs (1996, 1998); Texas Rangers (2000); Fukuoka Daiei Hawks (2001–2004); LG Twins (2007)
Medals
Men's baseball
Representing Puerto Rico
World Baseball Classic
Silver medal – second place	2013 San Francisco	Team

Pedro José Valdés Manzo (born June 29, 1973) is a Puerto Rican former professional baseball outfielder. He played parts of three seasons in Major League Baseball (MLB) for the Chicago Cubs and Texas Rangers, four seasons in Nippon Professional Baseball for the Fukuoka Daiei Hawks, and one season in the Korea Baseball Organization for the LG Twins. During his MLB career, he was listed as 6'1" tall weighing 180 pounds.

== Career ==
=== Chicago Cubs ===
Prior to playing professional baseball, Valdés attended Carlos Escobar López High School in Loiza, Puerto Rico. He was drafted by the Chicago Cubs in the 12th round of the 1990 draft, and he began his professional career that season. In 1992, he played for the Geneva Cubs and Peoria Chiefs, hitting a combined .260 with five home runs and 44 RBI in 99 games. He played for Peoria and the Daytona Cubs in 1993, hitting .302 with 15 home runs and 85 RBI in 125 games. In 1994, he played for the Orlando Cubs, hitting .282 with one home run and 37 RBI in 116 games. With the Orlando Cubs again in 1995, he hit .300 with seven home runs and 68 RBI in 114 games. He was a Southern League All-Star that year.

Valdés earned his big league debut in 1996, although he spent most of the season with the Iowa Cubs, hitting .295 with 15 home runs and 60 RBI in 103 games with them. On May 16, he made his major league debut against the Houston Astros. Pinch-hitting for Doug Jones, he struck out in his first and only at bat of the game. Overall, he would play in nine games that year, hitting .125 in eight at-bats.

He played for Iowa again in 1997, hitting .284 with 14 home runs and 60 RBI in 125 games. With Iowa for the third year in a row in 1998, Valdés hit .314 with 17 home runs and 40 RBI in 65 games with them. He made his way back to the big leagues that season, where he hit .217 in 23 at-bats. He was released by the Cubs on December 8, 1998.

=== Texas Rangers ===
On January 12, 1999, he was signed by the Boston Red Sox. However, he was released on April 5. A couple weeks later, on April 18, he was signed by the Rangers, and it was in their organization that he had his best season to that point. Playing for the Tulsa Drillers and Oklahoma RedHawks, Valdés hit .329 with 22 home runs and 76 RBI in 121 games. He followed that with another solid season in 2000, hitting .332 with 16 home runs and 78 RBI for the RedHawks. He played in 30 big league games that season, hitting .278 with one home run and five RBI in 54 at-bats. He appeared in his final big league game on October 1.

Overall, Valdés hit .247 with one home run and eight RBI in 85 big league at bats. After his career with the RedHawks, one author considered him to be the best hitter in team history.

=== Fukuoka Daiei Hawks ===
Purchased by the Fukuoka Daiei Hawks on December 1, 2000, Valdés would play in Japan for the next four seasons. For Fukuoka in 2001, he hit .310 with 21 home runs and 81 RBI in 137 games. The following year, he hit .303 with 21 home runs and 76 RBI for them in 121 games. In 2003, he hit .311 with 26 home runs and 104 RBI, and in 2004 he hit .279 with 18 home runs and 74 RBI.

=== Recent career ===
Valdés played in Mexico in 2005 and 2006, and in 2007 he played in Korea. He also played in the 2006 Caribbean Series. He returned to Mexico in 2008, and in 2010 split the season between the Olmecas de Tabasco and Monclova.
