= Norihiro Akahoshi =

Japanese baseball player (born 1976)

Norihiro Akahoshi 赤星 憲広
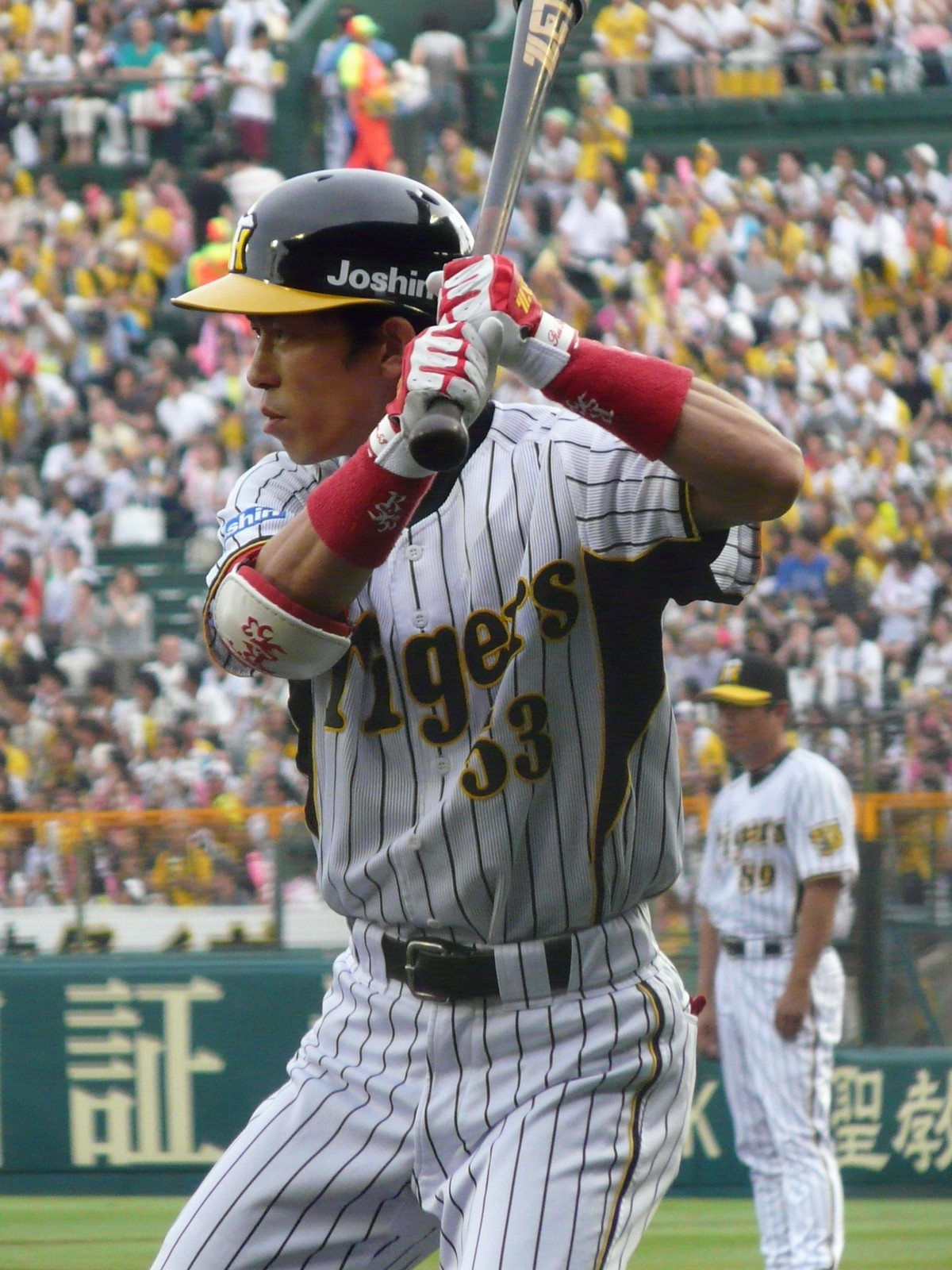
- Outfielder
- Born: April 10, 1976 (age 50); Kariya, Aichi, Japan
- Batted: Left Threw: Right

NPB debut
- March 30, 2001, for the Hanshin Tigers

Last NPB appearance
- September 12, 2009, for the Hanshin Tigers

NPB statistics
- Batting average: .295
- Home runs: 3
- Runs batted in: 215
- Stolen bases: 381
- Stats at Baseball Reference

Teams
- Hanshin Tigers (2001–2009)

Career highlights and awards
- 2001 Central League Rookie of the Year; 2001–2005 Central League stolen base champion; 2003–2005 Central League Best Nine Award; 2001, 2003–2006, 2008 Central League Golden Glove Award

Norihiro Akahoshi (赤星 憲広, Akahoshi Norihiro; born April 10, 1976) is a Japanese former professional baseball outfielder. He played in Nippon Professional Baseball (NPB) for the Hanshin Tigers from 2001 to 2009.

== Baseball career ==
=== Injury and retirement ===
Akahoshi announced his retirement on December 9, 2009. During the 2009 season, he was first deactivated in early July after sustaining a neck injury. Then, on September 12, his last game, Akahoshi aggravated a spinal disc herniation when he dived headlong in an attempt to catch a ball. He was diagnosed with spinal damage and has experienced pain in his neck and lower back as well as numbness in his hands and feet since.
