= Kazuhiko Shiotani =

Japanese baseball player (born 1974)

- Utility player
- Born: May 27, 1974; Takasago, Hyogo, Japan
- Batted: Right Threw: Right

Professional debut
- Nippon Professional Baseball: 1995, for the Hanshin Tigers
- Korea Baseball Organization: 2006, for the SK Wyverns

Last appearance
- 2006

NPB statistics
- Batting average: .264
- Home runs: 29
- RBI: 145

KBO statistics
- Batting average: .297
- Home runs: 3
- RBI: 19

Teams
- Hanshin Tigers (1995–2001); Orix BlueWave/Orix Buffaloes (2002–2005); SK Wyverns (2006)

Kazuhiko Shiotani (塩谷 和彦, Shiotani Kazuhiko; born May 27, 1974) is a Japanese former baseball utility player who spent 11 seasons in Nippon Professional Baseball as well as a stint in the United States and a campaign in Korea.

Prior to playing professionally, he attended Shinko Gakuen High School.

After playing in ni-gun for a spell, Shiotani was loaned to the Bristol Tigers of the American Appalachian League in 1994, with whom he went hitless in 14 at-bats. He returned to Japan and, from 1995 to 2001, earned playing time with the Tigers each season. From 1995 to 1997, he had a total of 17 at-bats and hit .118, though in 1996 he had a home run and four RBI. In 19 at-bats in 1998, he hit .105. He hit .282 in 117 at-bats in 1999, .252 in 107 at-bats in 2000 and .210 in 81 at-bats in 2001.

He was traded to the Orix BlueWave following the 2001 season. His playing time increased. In 2002, he hit .230 with five home runs and 20 RBI in 274 at-bats and in 2003—his only 'full' season of work—he hit .307 with eight home runs, 46 RBI and 134 hits in 123 games (436 at-bats). The next year, he hit .269 with nine home runs and 48 RBI in 360 at-bats and in 2005, his last campaign, he hit .176 with no home runs and three RBI in 34 at-bats.

All told, he hit .264 with 29 home runs, 145 RBI and 381 hits in an 11-year NPB career.

In 2006, he went to play in Korea, suiting up for SK Wyverns of the Korea Baseball Organization. In 23 games, he hit .297 with three home runs and 19 RBI.
