= Takayuki Shinohara =

Japanese baseball player

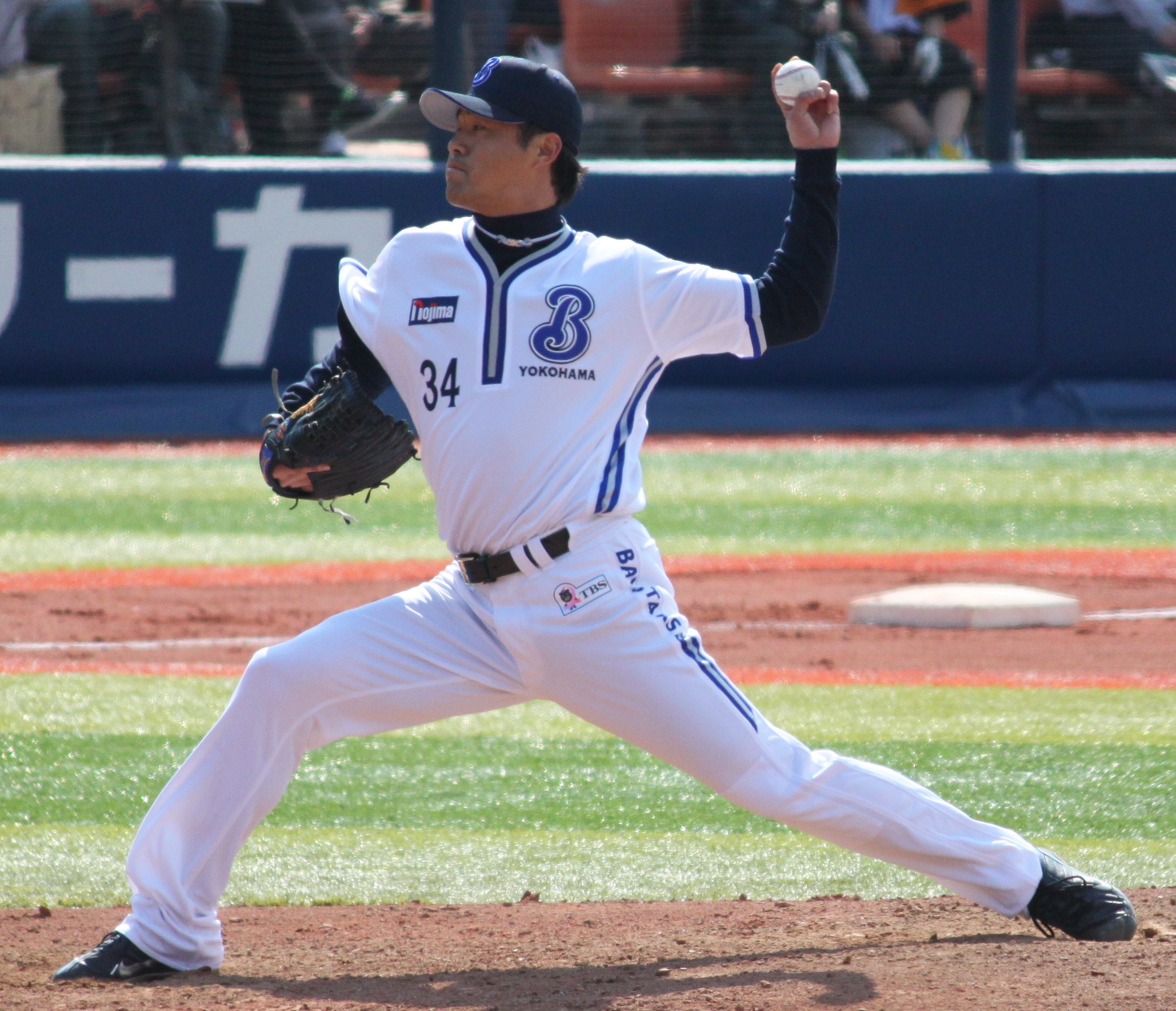
- Relief pitcher / Coach
- Born: September 7, 1976 (age 49); Fukuoka, Fukuoka, Japan
- Batted: Left Threw: Left

NPB debut
- April 8, 1998, for the Fukuoka SoftBank Hawks

Last NPB appearance
- October 2, 2012, for the Yokohama DeNA BayStars

NPB statistics (through 2013 season)
- Win–loss record: 33-19
- Earned run average: 3.28
- Strikeouts: 372
- Saves: 17
- Holds: 61

Teams
- As player: Fukuoka Daiei Hawks/Fukuoka SoftBank Hawks (1998–2009); Yokohama BayStars/Yokohama DeNA BayStars (2010–2013); As coach: Yokohama DeNA BayStars (2014–2018)

Takayuki Shinohara (篠原 貴行, Shinohara Takayuki; born September 7, 1976 in Fukuoka, Fukuoka, Japan) is a professional Japanese baseball player.
