= Kentaro Sekimoto =

Japanese baseball player (born 1978)

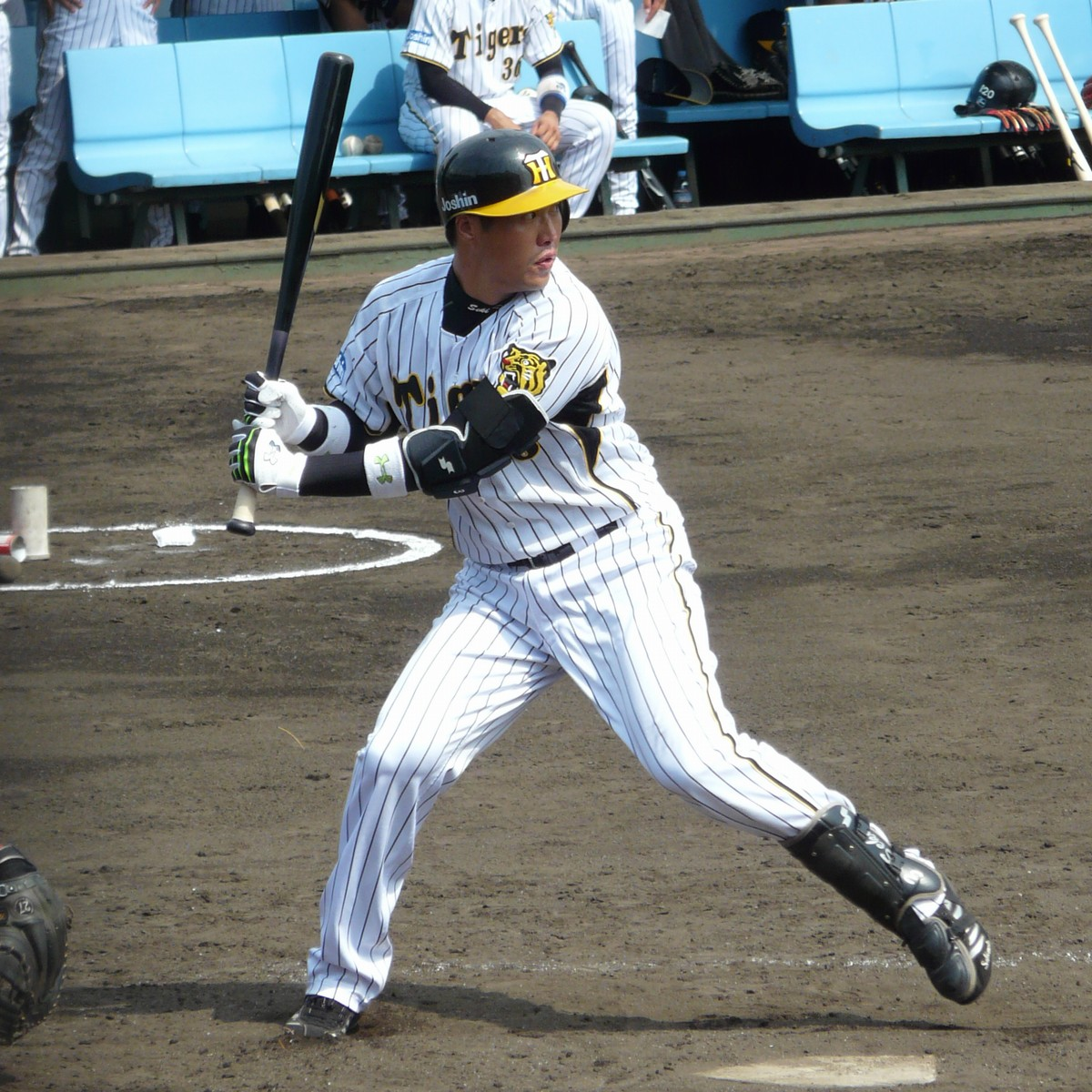
- Sekimoto with the Hanshin Tigers
- Infielder
- Born: August 26, 1978 (age 47)
- Bats: Right Throws: Right

NPB debut
- 2000, for the Hanshin Tigers

NPB statistics (through 2015)
- Batting average: .278
- Home runs: 48
- RBI: 312
- Stats at Baseball Reference

Teams
- Hanshin Tigers (2000, 2002–2015)

Kentaro Sekimoto (関本賢太郎, born August 26, 1978) is a Japanese former professional baseball infielder in Japan's Nippon Professional Baseball. He played with the Hanshin Tigers in 2000 and from 2002 to 2015.
