= 2003 Nippon Professional Baseball season =

2003 NPB season
- League: Nippon Professional Baseball
- Sport: Baseball
- Duration: March 28 – October 27, 2003

Regular season
- Season MVP: CL: Kei Igawa (HAN); PL: Kenji Johjima (DAI)

League postseason
- CL champions: Hanshin Tigers
- CL runners-up: Chunichi Dragons
- PL champions: Fukuoka Daiei Hawks
- PL runners-up: Seibu Lions

Japan Series
- Champions: Fukuoka Daiei Hawks
- Runners-up: Hanshin Tigers
- Finals MVP: Toshiya Sugiuchi (DAI)

NPB seasons
- ← 2002 2004 →

The 2003 Nippon Professional Baseball season was the 54th season of operation for Nippon Professional Baseball (NPB). This was the last season in which both leagues had their champion automatically go to the Japan Series, as the Pacific League would institute a playoff in 2004. This was the last season for the Nippon-Ham Fighters at the Tokyo Dome (which also housed the Yomiuri Giants), who elected to move to the Sapporo Dome in Kitahiroshima, Hokkaidō in the Sapporo metropolitan area. Hanshin clinched their first league pennant in eighteen years with their victory on 14 September. The season ended with the Fukuoka Daiei Hawks defeating the Hanshin Tigers in the 2003 Japan Series in seven games in a historic matchup that saw the home team win all seven games for the first time ever to go along with three games ending on walk-off hits.

== Standings ==
=== Central League ===
Central League	G	W	L	T	Pct.	GB
Hanshin Tigers	140	87	51	2	.629	--
Chunichi Dragons	140	73	66	1	.525	14.5
Yomiuri Giants	140	71	66	3	.518	15.5
Yakult Swallows	140	71	66	3	.518	15.5
Hiroshima Toyo Carp	140	67	71	2	.486	20.0
Yokohama BayStars	140	45	94	1	.325	42.5

=== Pacific League ===
Pacific League	G	W	L	T	Pct.	GB
Fukuoka Daiei Hawks	140	82	55	3	.596	--
Seibu Lions	140	77	61	2	.557	5.5
Osaka Kintetsu Buffaloes	140	74	64	2	.536	8.5
Chiba Lotte Marines	140	68	69	3	.496	14.0
Nippon-Ham Fighters	140	62	74	4	.457	19.5
Orix BlueWave	140	48	88	4	.357	33.5

== See also ==
- 2003 Major League Baseball season
