= 2008 Tohoku Rakuten Golden Eagles season =

Professional sports season in Nippon Professional Baseball

2008 Tohoku Rakuten Golden Eagles
- League: Pacific League
- Ballpark: Kleenex Stadium Miyagi
- Record: 65–76–3 (.461)
- League place: 5th
- Parent company: Rakuten
- President: Toru Shimada
- Manager: Katsuya Nomura
- Average attendance: 15,959

The 2008 Tohoku Rakuten Golden Eagles season was the fourth season of the Tohoku Rakuten Golden Eagles franchise. The Eagles played their home games at Miyagi Baseball Stadium in the city of Sendai as members of Nippon Professional Baseball's Pacific League. The team was led by Katsuya Nomura on his third season as team manager.

Rakuten did not qualify for the Climax Series, finishing the season in fifth place with a record of 65–76–3.

== Regular season ==
=== Standings ===
Pacific League regular season standings
Pos	Team	Pld	W	L	T	GB	PCT	Home	Away
1	Saitama Seibu Lions	144	76	64	4	—	.542	44–27–1	32–37–3
2	Orix Buffaloes	144	75	68	1	5.5	.524	41–31–0	34–37–1
3	Hokkaido Nippon-Ham Fighters	144	73	69	2	6	.514	41–30–1	32–39–1
4	Chiba Lotte Marines	144	73	70	1	7.5	.510	41–30–1	32–40–0
**5**	Tohoku Rakuten Golden Eagles	**144**	**65**	**76**	**3**	**12.5**	.462	**37–34–1**	**28–42–2**
6	Fukuoka SoftBank Hawks	144	64	77	3	13.5	.455	36–33–3	28–44–0

=== Interleague ===
Team	Pld	HW	HL	AW	AL	GB	PCT
Fukuoka SoftBank Hawks	24	10	2	5	7	—	.625
Hanshin Tigers	24	10	2	5	7	—	.625
Hokkaido Nippon-Ham Fighters	24	8	4	6	6	1	.583
Yomiuri Giants	24	9	3	5	7	1	.583
Tohoku Rakuten Golden Eagles	**24**	**6**	**6**	**7**	**5**	**2**	.542
Hiroshima Toyo Carp	24	6	6	7	5	2	.542
Chunichi Dragons	24	8	4	4	8	3	.500
Orix Buffaloes	24	6	6	5	7	4	.458
Tokyo Yakult Swallows	24	4	8	7	5	4	.458
Chiba Lotte Marines	24	6	6	4	8	5	.417
Saitama Seibu Lions	24	7	5	3	9	5	.417
Yokohama BayStars	24	5	7	1	11	9	.250

Updated to match(es) played on compute. Source:
Rules for classification: Whenever multiple teams have same number of wins, the team having better standings in last year's interleague games will have advantage, thus Fukuoka SoftBank Hawks won the interleague title, despite Hanshin Tigers beating the Hawks 3 out of 4 games. A similar rule applies to other teams tied in wins.

=== Record vs. opponents ===
2008 record vs. opponents
Team	Buffaloes	Eagles	Fighters	Hawks	Lions	Marines	CL
Buffaloes	—	13–10–1	13–11	14–10	10–14	14–10	11–13
**Eagles**	10–13–1	—	13–10–1	12–12	10–14	7–16–1	13–11
Fighters	11–13	10–13–1	—	17–7	9–14–1	12–12	14–10
Hawks	10–14	12–12	7–17	—	10–11–3	10–14	15–9
Lions	14–10	14–10	14–9–1	11–10–3	—	13–11	10–14
Marines	10–14	16–7–1	12–12	14–10	11–13	—	10–14

=== Opening Day roster ===
Thursday, March 20, 2008, at Fukuoka SoftBank Hawks

Order	Player	Pos.
1	Naoto Watanabe	SS
2	Teppei Tsuchiya	CF
3	Daisuke Kusano	3B
4	José Fernández	1B
5	Takeshi Yamasaki	DH
6	Rick Short	LF
7	Koichi Isobe	RF
8	Yosuke Takasu	2B
9	Akihito Fujii	C
—	Hisashi Iwakuma	P

=== Game log ===
2008 game log: 65–76–3 (Home: 37–34–1; Away: 28–42–2)
March: 4–4 (Home: 2–0; Away: 2–4)

#	Date	Opponent	Score	Win	Loss	Save	Stadium	Attendance	Record	Streak
1	March 20	@ Hawks	3–4	Kume (1–0)	**Guzmán** (0–1)	—	Yahoo Dome	35,722	0–1–0	L1
2	March 22	@ Hawks	4–5 (11)	Nitkowski (1–0)	**Watanabe** (0–1)	—	Yahoo Dome	31,014	0–2–0	L2
3	March 23	@ Hawks	0–4	Oba (1–0)	**Asai** (0–1)	—	Yahoo Dome	31,660	0–3–0	L3
4	March 25	@ Buffaloes	4–5	Takagi (1–0)	**Ichiba** (0–1)	Kato (3)	Kyocera Dome	34,911	0–4–0	L4
5	March 26	@ Buffaloes	11–0	**Nagai** (1–0)	Mitsuhara (0–1)	—	Kyocera Dome	11,052	1–4–0	W1
6	March 27	@ Buffaloes	2–0	**Iwakuma** (1–0)	Kaneko (1–1)	—	Kyocera Dome	23,547	2–4–0	W2
7	March 29	Fighters	7–2	**Tanaka** (1–0)	Hoshino (0–1)	—	Kleenex Stadium	20,189	3–4–0	W3
8	March 30	Fighters	3–1	**Asai** (1–1)	Glynn (0–2)	**Aoyama** (1)	Kleenex Stadium	19,518	4–4–0	W4

April: 13–10 (Home: 11–1; Away: 2–9)

#	Date	Opponent	Score	Win	Loss	Save	Stadium	Attendance	Record	Streak
9	April 1	Marines	7–4	**Koyama** (1–0)	Komiyama (0–2)	**Aoyama** (2)	Kleenex Stadium	10,927	5–4–0	W5
10	April 2	Marines	6–3	**Nagai** (2–0)	Shimizu (0–2)	**Aoyama** (3)	Kleenex Stadium	14,285	6–4–0	W6
11	April 3	Marines	9–1	**Iwakuma** (2–0)	Kubo (1–1)	—	Kleenex Stadium	15,018	7–4–0	W7
12	April 4	@ Lions	2–4	Hoashi (1–0)	**Lin** (0–1)	Graman (2)	Shikishima Stadium	17,599	7–5–0	L1
13	April 5	@ Lions	2–4	Ishii (3–0)	**Tanaka** (1–1)	Onuma (1)	Seibu Dome	23,902	7–6–0	L2
14	April 6	@ Lions	3–4	Kinney (2–1)	**Asai** (1–2)	Graman (3)	Seibu Dome	18,213	7–7–0	L3
15	April 8	@ Fighters	7–8	Takeda (3–0)	**Lin** (0–1)	Nakamura (3)	Sapporo Dome	20,257	7–8–0	L4
16	April 9	@ Fighters	2–4	Yoshikawa (1–2)	**Nagai** (2–1)	Nakamura (4)	Sapporo Dome	19,044	7–9–0	L5
17	April 10	@ Fighters	0–1	Yu Darvish (3–0)	**Iwakuma** (2–1)	—	Sapporo Dome	25,197	7–10–0	L6
18	April 11	Buffaloes	5–4 (10)	**Aoyama** (1–0)	Yamaguchi (1–1)	—	Kleenex Stadium	10,626	8–10–0	W1
19	April 12	Buffaloes	3–0	**Tanaka** (2–1)	Kondo (2–1)	—	Kleenex Stadium	15,456	9–10–0	W2
20	April 13	Buffaloes	12–6	**Asai** (2–2)	Kawagoe (1–2)	—	Kleenex Stadium	12,879	10–10–0	W3
21	April 15	@ Marines	6–7	Ono (1–0)	**Nagai** (2–2)	Ogino (4)	Chiba Marine Stadium	17,336	10–11–0	L1
22	April 16	@ Marines	1–2	Shimizu (2–2)	**Guzmán** (0–2)	—	Chiba Marine Stadium	16,853	10–12–0	L2
23	April 17	@ Marines	11–2	**Iwakuma** (3–1)	Kubo (1–3)	—	Chiba Marine Stadium	9,211	11–12–0	W1
—	April 19	Lions	Postponed (rain) – Makeup date: October 4				Kleenex Stadium	—	—	—
24	April 20	Lions	3–4 (10)	Iwasaki (1–0)	**Aoyama** (1–1)	Graman (6)	Kleenex Stadium	19,601	11–13–0	L1
25	April 22	Hawks	4–3	**Asai** (3–2)	Powell (1–1)	**Aoyama** (4)	Kleenex Stadium	11,799	12–13–0	W1
26	April 23	Hawks	4–0	**Nagai** (3–2)	Otonari (2–3)	—	Kleenex Stadium	12,353	13–13–0	W2
—	April 24	Hawks	Postponed (rain) – Makeup date: September 30				Kleenex Stadium	—	—	—
27	April 25	Fighters	6–1	**Iwakuma** (4–1)	Yoshikawa (1–4)	—	Kleenex Stadium	13,213	14–13–0	W3
28	April 26	Fighters	6–1	**Guzmán** (1–2)	Fujii (1–2)	—	Kleenex Stadium	16,826	15–13–0	W4
29	April 27	Fighters	5–0	**Tanaka** (3–1)	Glynn (1–4)	—	Kleenex Stadium	20,634	16–13–0	W5
30	April 29	@ Buffaloes	1–2	Yamaguchi (2–1)	**Asai** (3–3)	Kato (7)	Kyocera Dome	18,571	16–14–0	L1
31	April 30	@ Buffaloes	5–4	**Koyama** (2–0)	Yamaguchi (2–2)	—	Kyocera Dome	13,146	17–14–0	W1

May: 12–11 (Home: 7–6; Away: 5–5)

#	Date	Opponent	Score	Win	Loss	Save	Stadium	Attendance	Record	Streak
32	May 1	@ Buffaloes	1–6	Komatsu (3–0)	**Ichiba** (0–2)	—	Skymark Stadium	14,003	17–15–0	L1
33	May 2	@ Fighters	1–5	Tadano (1–0)	**Iwakuma** (4–2)	Nakamura (9)	Sapporo Dome	41,124	17–16–0	L2
34	May 3	@ Fighters	5–12	Sakamoto (1–1)	**Kawagishi** (0–1)	—	Sapporo Dome	40,083	17–17–0	L3
35	May 4	@ Fighters	7–1	**Tanaka** (4–1)	Glynn (1–5)	—	Sapporo Dome	42,126	18–17–0	W1
36	May 5	Hawks	5–7 (11)	Ogura (4–1)	**Koyama** (2–1)	Yanase (1)	Kleenex Stadium	20,572	18–18–0	L1
37	May 6	Hawks	4–8	Otonari (3–4)	**Nagai** (3–3)	—	Kleenex Stadium	20,885	18–19–0	L2
38	May 7	Hawks	9–7	**Asai** (4–3)	Takeoka (0–1)	**Arime** (1)	Kleenex Stadium	10,667	19–19–0	W1
39	May 9	@ Marines	11–4	**Iwakuma** (5–2)	Ono (2–2)	—	Chiba Marine Stadium	16,849	20–19–0	W2
—	May 10	@ Marines	Postponed (rain) – Makeup date: September 19				Chiba Marine Stadium	—	—	—
40	May 11	@ Marines	1–6	Shimizu (4–3)	**Tanaka** (4–2)	—	Chiba Marine Stadium	24,892	20–20–0	L1
41	May 13	Buffaloes	2–8	Kondo (3–4)	**Nagai** (3–4)	—	Fukushima Azuma	7,041	20–21–0	L2
—	May 14	Buffaloes	Postponed (rain) – Makeup date: September 4				Kleenex Stadium	—	—	—
42	May 15	Buffaloes	1–2	Komatsu (4–0)	**Asai** (4–4)	Kato (10)	Kleenex Stadium	11,581	20–22–0	L3
43	May 16	Lions	8–2	**Iwakuma** (6–2)	Kishi (4–2)	—	Kleenex Stadium	12,057	21–22–0	W1
44	May 17	Lions	3–2 (12)	**Kawagishi** (1–1)	Okamoto (0–1)	—	Kleenex Stadium	14,265	22–22–0	W2
45	May 18	Lions	3–7	Hsu (1–0)	**Tanaka** (4–3)	—	Kleenex Stadium	20,253	22–23–0	L1
46	May 20	Dragons	6–1	**Nagai** (4–4)	Ogasawara (4–3)	—	Kleenex Stadium	12,964	23–23–0	W1
47	May 21	Dragons	1–3	Yamamoto (3–0)	**Asai** (4–5)	Iwase (13)	Kleenex Stadium	15,372	23–24–0	L1
48	May 23	BayStars	7–5	**Iwakuma** (7–2)	Kobayashi (1–1)	**Koyama** (1)	Kleenex Stadium	14,091	24–24–0	W1
49	May 24	BayStars	2–1	**Guzmán** (2–2)	Oyamada (1–2)	**Koyama** (2)	Kleenex Stadium	17,435	25–24–0	W2
50	May 25	@ Swallows	10–2	**Tanaka** (5–3)	Kamada (0–1)	—	Meiji Jingu Stadium	22,491	26–24–0	W3
51	May 26	@ Swallows	5–4	**Nagai** (5–4)	Rios (2–6)	**Koyama** (3)	Meiji Jingu Stadium	16,483	27–24–0	W4
52	May 28	@ Giants	1–6	Utsumi (3–3)	**Hasebe** (0–1)	—	Tokyo Dome	43,132	27–25–0	L1
53	May 29	@ Giants	4–2	**Asai** (5–5)	Greisinger (5–3)	**Koyama** (4)	Tokyo Dome	41,106	28–25–0	W1
54	May 31	Carp	8–3	**Iwakuma** (8–2)	Takahashi (6–3)	—	Kleenex Stadium	14,393	29–25–0	W2

June

#	Date	Opponent	Score	Win	Loss	Save	Stadium	Attendance	Record	Streak

July

#	Date	Opponent	Score	Win	Loss	Save	Stadium	Attendance	Record	Streak

August

#	Date	Opponent	Score	Win	Loss	Save	Stadium	Attendance	Record	Streak

September

#	Date	Opponent	Score	Win	Loss	Save	Stadium	Attendance	Record	Streak

October

#	Date	Opponent	Score	Win	Loss	Save	Stadium	Attendance	Record	Streak

Win | Loss | Tie | Postponement | = Interleague play
**Bold** = Eagles team member

== Roster ==
2008 Tohoku Rakuten Golden Eagles
Roster
Pitchers: 0 Hiroshi Sato; 11 Yasuhiro Ichiba; 13 Hisashi Ogura; 14 Kenta Satake; 14 Rui Makino; 18 Masahiro Tanaka; 20 Kohei Hasebe; 21 Hisashi Iwakuma; 26 Kanehisa Arime; 28 Hiroshi Katayama; 30 Satoshi Nagai; 34 Koki Watanabe; 36 Hideki Asai; 40 Masaru Yoshizaki; 41 Koji Aoyama; 42 Marcus Gwyn; 49 Lin Ying-chieh; 50 Domingo Guzmán; 51 Tsuyoshi Kawagishi; 54 Hisashi Kitani; 57 Shinichiro Koyama; 65 Akira Matsumoto	Catchers: 31 Akihito Fujii; 37 Motohiro Shima; 39 Suguru Ino; 44 Jin Nakatani; 48 Tadashi Ishimine; 58 Kazuyoshi Kimura; Infielders: 1 Tatsuya Shiokawa; 2 Naoto Watanabe; 3 Yuji Yoshioka; 4 Yosuke Takasu; 6 Fernando Seguignol; 7 Takeshi Yamasaki; 12 Daisuke Kusano; 17 José Fernández; 32 Yoshinori Okihara; 35 Shoji Ohiro; 38 Katsumi Yamashita; 66 Wataru Nishimura; 68 Shintaro Masuda; 98 Kensuke Uchimura	Outfielders: 8 Koichi Isobe; 23 Ryo Hijirisawa; 24 Takahiro Yamazaki; 25 Fuminori Yokogawa; 33 Yosuke Hiraishi; 46 Teppei Tsuchiya; 55 Rick Short; 61 Kenshi Kawaguchi; 62 Fumikazu Takanami; 64 Toshiya Nakashima; 99 Masato Nakamura	Manager: 19 Katsuya Nomura; Coaches: 78 Hideki Hashigami (head); 71 Makoto Kito (pitching); 76 Kento Sugiyama (bullpen); 77 Takahiro Ikeyama (hitting); 81 Koichi Sekikawa (assistant hitting); 80 Shunji Nishi (infield defense); 75 Manabu Satake (outfield defense); 73 Katsunori Nomura (battery); 70 Katsuhiko Yamada (battery)

== Player statistics ==
=== Batting ===
2008 Tohoku Rakuten Golden Eagles batting statistics
Player	G	AB	R	H	2B	3B	HR	RBI	SB	BB	K	AVG	OBP	SLG	TB
Hideki Asai	30	9	1	1	0	0	0	1	0	0	6	.111	.111	.111	1
José Fernández	142	541	81	163	40	0	18	99	5	53	78	.301	.368	.475	257
Akihito Fujii	90	190	15	50	7	0	0	13	3	18	25	.263	.329	.300	57
Domingo Guzmán	23	5	0	0	0	0	0	0	0	0	3	.000	.000	.000	0
Kohei Hasebe	13	1	0	0	0	0	0	0	0	0	1	.000	.000	.000	0
Ryo Hijirisawa	34	41	7	11	0	0	0	3	5	5	10	.268	.333	.268	11
Yosuke Hiraishi	6	13	2	3	1	0	0	1	2	1	1	.231	.333	.308	4
Suguru Ino	23	23	2	2	0	0	0	2	0	1	5	.087	.125	.087	2
Tadashi Ishimine	1	3	0	0	0	0	0	0	0	0	1	.000	.000	.000	0
Koichi Isobe	46	124	6	29	2	0	0	12	2	12	16	.234	.300	.250	31
Hisashi Iwakuma	28	7	0	0	0	0	0	0	0	0	5	.000	.000	.000	0
Hiroshi Katayama	18	2	0	0	0	0	0	0	0	0	1	.000	.000	.000	0
Kenshi Kawaguchi	63	94	7	19	2	1	1	9	0	12	18	.202	.306	.277	26
Kazuyoshi Kimura	9	10	0	0	0	0	0	0	0	0	0	.000	.000	.000	0
Daisuke Kusano	118	328	36	89	15	0	3	36	2	20	33	.271	.321	.345	113
Shintaro Masuda	2	4	0	0	0	0	0	0	0	0	1	.000	.000	.000	0
Satoshi Nagai	28	2	0	0	0	0	0	0	0	0	0	.000	.000	.000	0
Masato Nakamura	49	144	15	42	6	3	1	12	6	12	14	.292	.346	.396	57
Toshiya Nakashima	81	178	27	56	10	1	5	25	1	21	28	.315	.397	.466	83
Jin Nakatani	4	2	0	1	0	0	0	0	0	0	1	.500	.500	.500	1
Wataru Nishimura	9	17	1	2	1	0	0	3	0	1	6	.118	.167	.176	3
Shoji Ohiro	8	8	0	0	0	0	0	0	0	0	2	.000	.000	.000	0
Yoshinori Okihara	14	33	2	8	1	0	0	0	0	1	9	.242	.265	.273	9
Fernando Seguignol^{†}	39	136	24	44	7	0	13	40	0	14	40	.324	.408	.662	90
Motohiro Shima	85	196	20	45	13	0	0	19	4	16	40	.230	.288	.296	58
Tatsuya Shiokawa	82	43	18	7	1	1	0	1	5	4	11	.163	.234	.233	10
Rick Short	134	491	62	163	31	2	12	71	4	25	51	.332	.365	.477	234
Fumikazu Takanami	51	19	10	4	2	0	0	4	5	1	3	.211	.250	.316	6
Yosuke Takasu	123	383	44	108	20	1	4	45	6	29	38	.282	.338	.371	142
Masahiro Tanaka	25	6	0	0	0	0	0	1	0	0	2	.000	.000	.000	0
Teppei Tsuchiya	124	422	52	114	29	6	5	56	5	42	52	.270	.345	.403	170
Kensuke Uchimura	47	152	21	44	5	0	0	13	9	6	21	.289	.327	.322	49
Naoto Watanabe	132	470	79	118	11	2	0	30	34	54	66	.251	.354	.283	133
Takeshi Yamasaki	142	510	63	141	21	0	26	80	1	73	118	.276	.372	.471	240
Katsumi Yamashita	33	78	13	20	3	0	1	9	0	6	19	.256	.318	.333	26
Takahiro Yamazaki	14	39	6	8	0	1	1	3	0	0	8	.205	.238	.333	13
Fuminori Yokogawa	55	140	13	32	3	0	4	15	2	11	37	.229	.285	.336	47
Yuji Yoshioka	12	16	0	5	1	0	0	1	0	1	7	.313	.353	.375	6
Total：38 players	1,937	4,880	627	1,329	232	18	94	604	101	439	777	.272	.340	.385	1,879

^{†}Denotes player joined the team mid-season. Stats reflect time with the Eagles only.
^{‡}Denotes player left the team mid-season. Stats reflect time with the Eagles only.
Bold/italics denotes best in the league

=== Pitching ===
2008 Tohoku Rakuten Golden Eagles pitching statistics
Player	W	L	ERA	G	GS	SV	IP	H	R	ER	BB	K
Koji Aoyama	3	8	3.89	41	6	4	78.2	86	39	34	26	61
Kanehisa Arime	2	2	2.05	66	0	2	44	33	10	10	17	45
Hideki Asai	9	11	4.38	29	23	0	148	165	81	72	60	122
Domingo Guzmán	2	7	3.87	23	16	0	102.1	99	47	44	34	65
Marcus Gwyn^{†}	1	1	3.86	19	0	3	18.2	21	12	8	7	16
Kohei Hasebe	1	4	9.93	13	6	0	35.1	56	41	39	22	23
Yasuhiro Ichiba	0	3	9.77	12	8	0	31.1	49	38	34	21	27
Hisashi Iwakuma	21	4	1.87	28	28	0	201.2	161	48	42	36	159
Hiroshi Katayama	2	7	3.65	18	12	0	79	70	35	32	35	71
Tsuyoshi Kawagishi	4	3	1.94	54	0	3	55.2	49	14	12	20	47
Hisashi Kitani	0	3	4.12	22	5	1	39.1	40	18	18	13	24
Shinichiro Koyama	3	5	3.72	54	0	4	67.2	58	29	28	25	71
Lin Ying-chieh	0	2	5.23	5	1	0	10.1	10	7	6	5	3
Rui Makino^{‡}	0	0	9.00	1	0	0	1	2	1	1	0	1
Akira Matsumoto	0	0	5.93	21	0	0	27.1	41	19	18	11	16
Satoshi Nagai	6	7	4.68	27	15	0	117.1	121	68	61	47	111
Hisashi Ogura	0	0	9.39	8	0	0	7.2	11	8	8	1	10
Kenta Satake^{†}	2	0	2.14	24	0	0	21	15	6	5	9	22
Hiroshi Sato	0	0	0.00	1	0	0	.1	1	0	0	0	0
Masahiro Tanaka	9	7	3.49	25	24	1	172.2	171	71	67	54	159
Koki Watanabe	0	2	9.45	14	0	0	6.2	9	7	7	7	3
Masaru Yoshizaki	0	0	4.80	17	0	0	15	15	8	8	6	8
Total：22 players	65	76	3.89	522	144	18	1,281	1,283	607	553	456	1,064

^{†}Denotes player joined the team mid-season. Stats reflect time with the Eagles only.
^{‡}Denotes player left the team mid-season. Stats reflect time with the Eagles only.
Bold/italics denotes best in the league

== Awards and honors ==
Most Valuable Player Award

- Hisashi Iwakuma

Eiji Sawamura Award

- Hisashi Iwakuma

Nippon Life Monthly MVP Award

- Takeshi Yamasaki - March/April (batter)
- Hisashi Iwakuma - June (pitcher)
- Fernando Seguignol - September (batter)

Best Nine Award

- Hisashi Iwakuma - pitcher
- Rick Short - outfielder

Golden Spirit Award

- Hisashi Iwakuma

All-Star Series selections

- Hisashi Iwakuma - pitcher
- Masahiro Tanaka - pitcher
- Rick Short - infielder
- Takeshi Yamasaki - designated hitter

All-Star Series MVP

- Takeshi Yamasaki - Game 1

Nippon Life Award (Interleague play)

- Hisashi Iwakuma

Best Battery Award

- Hisashi Iwakuma and Akihito Fujii

JA Zen-Noh Go-Go Awards

Good Catch Award (July)
- Masato Nakamura (July 2)

== Farm team ==
Eastern League regular season standings
Team	G	W	L	T	Win%	GB	Home	Away
Tokyo Yakult Swallows	96	55	34	7	.618	—	35–10–3	20–24–4
Yomiuri Giants	96	58	36	2	.617	—	29–15–1	29–21–1
Shonan Searex	96	50	43	3	.538	7	23–24–1	27–19–2
Tohoku Rakuten Golden Eagles	96	46	45	5	.505	10	24–21–3	22–24–2
Saitama Seibu Lions	96	42	51	3	.452	15	23–25–2	19–26–1
Chiba Lotte Marines	96	37	53	6	.411	18½	21–24–3	16–29–3
Hokkaido Nippon-Ham Fighters	96	33	61	2	.351	24½	22–26–1	11–35–1

== Nippon Professional Baseball draft ==
2008 Tohoku Rakuten Golden Eagles Draft selections
Round	Name	Position	Affiliation	Signed?
1	Hiromichi Fujiwara	Pitcher	NTT Nishi Nippon	Yes
2	Taishi Nakagawa	Infielder	Sakuragaoka High School	Yes
3	Ryohei Isaka	Pitcher	Nippon Steel Kashima	Yes
4	Yusuke Inoue	Pitcher	Aoyama Gakuin University	Yes
5	Yusuke Kusuki	Outfielder	Panasonic	Yes
6	Wataru Karashima	Pitcher	Iizuka High School	Yes
Development players
1	Jobu Morita	Infielder	Kagawa Olive Guyners	Yes
