= 2005 Tohoku Rakuten Golden Eagles season =

Professional sports season in Nippon Professional Baseball

2005 Tohoku Rakuten Golden Eagles
- League: Pacific League
- Ballpark: Fullcast Stadium Miyagi
- Record: 38–97–1 (.281), 51½ GB
- League place: 6th
- Parent company: Rakuten
- President: Toru Shimada
- Manager: Yasushi Tao
- Average attendance: 14,369

The 2005 Tohoku Rakuten Golden Eagles season was the first season of the Tohoku Rakuten Golden Eagles franchise. The Eagles played their home games at Fullcast Stadium Miyagi in the city of Sendai as members of Nippon Professional Baseball's Pacific League. The team was led by Yasushi Tao in his first and only season as the team's manager.

== Regular season ==
=== Standings ===
2005 Pacific League regular season standings
Pos	Team	G	W	L	T	Pct.	GB	Home	Road
1	Fukuoka SoftBank Hawks^{†}	136	89	45	2	.664	—	45–21–2	44–24
2	Chiba Lotte Marines*	136	84	49	3	.632	4½	38–30	46–19–3
3	Seibu Lions*	136	67	69	0	.493	23	36–32	31–37
4	Orix Buffaloes	136	62	70	4	.470	26	30–37–1	32–33–3
5	Hokkaido Nippon-Ham Fighters	136	62	71	3	.466	26½	34–31–3	28–40
6	Tohoku Rakuten Golden Eagles	136	38	97	1	.281	51½	21–46–1	17–51

^{†} Advanced directly to the second stage of the Pacific League Playoffs
* Advanced to the first stage of the Pacific League Playoffs

=== Interleague ===
2005 regular season interleague standings
Pos	Team	G	W	L	T	Pct.	GB	Home	Road
1	Chiba Lotte Marines^{†}	36	24	11	1	.686	—	10–8	14–3–1
2	Fukuoka SoftBank Hawks	36	23	12	1	.657	1	10–7–1	13–5
3	Hanshin Tigers	36	21	13	2	.618	2½	9–7–2	12–6
4	Yomiuri Giants	36	18	14	4	.563	4½	11–6–1	7–8–3
5	Yakult Swallows	36	20	16	0	.556	4½	8–10	12–6
6	Yokohama BayStars	36	19	17	0	.528	5½	11–7	8–10
7	Orix Buffaloes	36	17	16	3	.515	6	8–9–1	9–7–2
8	Seibu Lions	36	18	18	0	.500	6½	10–8	8–10
9	Chunichi Dragons	36	15	21	0	.417	9½	8–10	7–11
10	Hokkaido Nippon-Ham Fighters	36	12	22	2	.353	11½	9–7–2	3–15
11	Hiroshima Toyo Carp	36	11	24	1	.314	13	6–12	5–12–1
12	Tohoku Rakuten Golden Eagles	36	11	25	0	.306	13½	6–12	5–13

^{†} Interleague champion

=== Opening Day starting roster ===
Saturday, March 26, 2005, vs. Chiba Lotte Marines

2005 Rakuten Eagles Opening Day starting roster
Order	Player	Position
1	Koichi Sekikawa	Left fielder
2	Yosuke Takasu	Second baseman
3	Kenshi Kawaguchi	First baseman
4	Luis Lopez	Third baseman
5	Takeshi Yamasaki	Designated hitter
6	Koichi Isobe	Right fielder
7	Tadaharu Sakai	Shortstop
8	Akihito Fujii	Catcher
9	Tetsuya Iida	Center fielder
—	Hisashi Iwakuma	Starting pitcher

== Roster ==
2005 Tohoku Rakuten Golden Eagles
Roster
Pitchers: 11 Yasuhiro Ichiba; 12 Hiroshi Kobayashi; 14 Yasuyuki Kawamoto; 15 Kazuo Fukumori; 16 Hiroki Yamamura; 17 Hisashi Tokano; 18 Koki Watanabe; 19 Tetsuro Kawajiri; 20 Shinji Taninaka; 21 Hisashi Iwakuma; 22 Hisashi Aikyoh; 24 Hiroshi Takamura; 26 Kanehisa Arime; 27 Hisashi Ogura; 28 Masahiko Kaneda; 29 Eiji Yano; 30 Makoto Kito; 34 Hideo Koike; 36 Hideki Asai; 43 Satoshi Tokumoto; 47 Gary Rath; 49 Toyohiko Yoshida; 50 Aaron Myette; 54 Kevin Hodges; 57 Shinichiro Koyama; 60 Hironori Fujisaki; 62 Matt Skrmetta; 69 Shigeo Tamaki	Catchers: 31 Akihito Fujii; 39 Takeshi Nakamura; 45 Ken Shinzato; 52 Katsunori Nomura; 58 Kenji Nagasaka; Infielders: 0 Tadaharu Sakai; 3 Yuji Yoshioka; 4 Yosuke Takasu; 5 Hidemitsu Saito; 7 Takeshi Yamasaki; 13 Koichi Oshima; 32 Tadatoki Maeda; 32 Yoshinori Okihara; 37 Yasuo Nagaike; 38 Katsumi Yamashita; 41 Osamu Hoshino; 42 Luis Lopez; 44 Damon Minor; 65 Andy Tracy	Outfielders: 00 Akihito Moritani; 2 Tetsuya Iida; 8 Koichi Isobe; 9 Fumitoshi Takano; 23 Koichi Sekikawa; 25 Manabu Satake; 33 Yosuke Hiraishi; 40 Daisuke Masuda; 48 Ryutaro Tsuji; 61 Kenshi Kawaguchi; 63 Akihisa Makida	Manager: 88 Yasushi Tao; Coaches: 77 Daisuke Yamashita (Head); 87 Masanori Matsui (Head); 74 Kazuyoshi Ono (Pitching); 75 Norihiro Komada (Batting); 85 Koju Hirohashi (Defense/base running/batting); 80 Masahiro Takahashi (Defense/base running); 84 Kazuhiko Yamashita (Batting)
