= List of Nippon Professional Baseball players (N) =

The following is a list of Nippon Professional Baseball players with the last name starting with N, retired or active.

== N ==
- Hiroshi Nagadomi
- Satoshi Nagai
- Tomohiro Nagai
- Yasuo Nagaike
- Katsuhiro Nagakawa
- Kenji Nagami
- Shoji Nagamine
- Yoshinari Nagano
- Kenji Nagasaka
- Hajime Nagasaki
- Shinichi Nagasaki
- Takeo Nagasawa
- Kazushige Nagashima
- Kiyoyuki Nagashima
- Shigeo Nagashima
- Masahiro Nagata
- Masaru Nagata
- Yoshitaka Nagata
- Naoyuki Naitoh
- Yuta Naitoh
- Toshio Naka
- Yusuke Nakabayashi
- Koji Nakada
- Hiroki Nakagawa
- Takaharu Nakagawa
- Taiki Nakagoh
- Shin Nakagomi
- Hiroyuki Nakahama
- Naoki Nakahigashi
- Daisuke Nakai
- Haruyasu Nakajima
- Hiroyuki Nakajima
- Satoshi Nakajima
- Terushi Nakajima
- Kazuki Nakamoto
- Akira Nakamura
- Hayato Nakamura
- Issei Nakamura
- Katsuhiro Nakamura
- Ken Nakamura
- Koichi Nakamura
- Koji Nakamura
- Masato Nakamura
- Micheal Nakamura
- Norihiro Nakamura
- Ryoji Nakamura
- Takeshi Nakamura
- Takeya Nakamura
- Wataru Nakamura
- Yasuhiro Nakamura
- Yoshiyuki Nakamura
- Yutaka Nakamura
- Hitoshi Nakane
- Chikashi Nakanishi
- Futoshi Nakanishi
- Kenta Nakanishi
- Kiyooki Nakanishi
- Yukihito Nakanishi
- Eiichi Nakano
- Yukiyasu Nakanose
- Susumu Nakanowatari
- Toshihiro Nakao
- Toshiya Nakashima
- Kenichi Nakata
- Sho Nakata
- Shota Nakata
- Jin Nakatani
- Tsubasa Nakatani
- Hiroaki Nakayama
- Masayuki Nakayama
- Mitsuhisa Nakayama
- Shinya Nakayama
- Atsushi Nakazato
- Tetsuya Nakazato
- Tadaatsu Nakazawa
- Masashi Nara
- Hiroshi Narahara
- Toshihide Narimoto
- Yoshihisa Naruse
- Masataka Nashida
- Takumi Nasuno
- Troy Neel
- Hirotaka Neichi
- Bryant Nelson
- Maximo Nelson
- Rikuo Nemoto
- Ryuki Nemoto
- Shunichi Nemoto
- Tomohisa Nemoto
- Alan Newman
- Satoshi Nibe
- Rod Nichols
- Melvin Nieves
- Kaoru Nihei
- Shinji Niinuma
- Dave Nilsson
- Toru Nimura
- Masami Ninomiya
- Tomohiro Nioka
- Kiyotaka Nishi
- Shunji Nishi
- Toshihisa Nishi
- Yoshihiro Nishi
- Shinji Nishida
- Tokuo Nishigaki
- Fumiya Nishiguchi
- Takayuki Nishijima
- Akira Nishikawa
- Junji Nishikawa
- Shinichi Nishikawa
- Takashi Nishimoto
- Yukio Nishimoto
- Kentaro Nishimura
- Masao Nishimura
- Motofumi Nishimura
- Norifumi Nishimura
- Tatsuji Nishimura
- Wataru Nishimura
- Yuki Nishimura
- Hiroshi Nishioka
- Tsuyoshi Nishioka
- Yoshihiro Nishioka
- Hisanori Nishitani
- Katsuhiro Nishiura
- Kazutaka Nishiyama
- Michitaka Nishiyama
- Shūji Nishiyama
- Nobuhiro Nishizaki
- Satoshi Nishizaki
- Yukihiro Nishizaki
- Michio Nishizawa
- Yōsuke Nishizawa
- C. J. Nitkowski
- Takuma Nitoh
- Hisao Niura
- Masaya Niwa
- Hiroki Nobayashi
- Daisuke Nobue
- Takuto Nobuhara
- Koji Noda
- Kosuke Noda
- Akira Noguchi
- Jiro Noguchi
- Shigeki Noguchi
- Toshihiro Noguchi
- Yoshiyuki Noguchi
- Masashi Nohara
- Atsushi Nohmi
- Wataru Nohnin
- Takahiko Nomaguchi
- Hideo Nomo
- Hiroki Nomura
- Hiroyuki Nomura
- Katsunori Nomura
- Katsuya Nomura
- Kenjiro Nomura
- Takahito Nomura
- Shingo Nonaka
- Tetsuhiro Nonaka
- Takeshi Nonogaki
- Hiroshi Numata
- Jose Nunez
