= List of Nippon Professional Baseball players (I) =

The following is a list of Nippon Professional Baseball players with the last name starting with I, retired or active.

== I ==
| Name | Debut | Final Game | Position | Teams | Ref |
|---|---|---|---|---|---|
| Tomokazu Iba | | | | | |
| Hirokazu Ibata | | | | | |
| Atsushi Ibayashi | | | | | |
| Yasuhiro Ichiba | | | | | |
| Kei Ichihara | | | | | |
| Suguru Ichikawa | | | | | |
| Shotaro Ide | | | | | |
| Tatsuya Ide | | | | | |
| Kenichiro Idemoto | | | | | |
| Nobutoshi Ido | | | | | |
| Akihito Igarashi | | | | | |
| Hideki Igarashi | | | | | |
| Ryota Igarashi | | | | | |
| Shinichi Igarashi | | | | | |
| Takaaki Igarashi | | | | | |
| Kei Igawa | | | | | |
| Tadahito Iguchi | | | | | |
| Haruki Ihara | | | | | |
| Hiroyuki Iida | | | | | |
| Masashi Iida | | | | | |
| Ryuichiro Iida | | | | | |
| Tetsuya Iida | | | | | |
| Tokuji Iida | | | | | |
| Yasushi Iihara | | | | | |
| Kazuhiko Iijima | | | | | |
| Yuji Iiyama | | | | | |
| Tomiji Iizuka | | | | | |
| Takahiro Ijuin | | | | | |
| Chikafusa Ikeda | | | | | |
| Gohki Ikeda | | | | | |
| Ikuo Ikeda | | | | | |
| Ken Ikeda | | | | | |
| Masayuki Ikeno | | | | | |
| Koichi Ikeue | | | | | |
| Takahiro Ikeyama | | | | | |
| Masaki Ikoma | | | | | |
| Toshiaki Imae | | | | | |
| Keigo Imai | | | | | |
| Keisuke Imai | | | | | |
| Nariyuki Imakurusu | | | | | |
| Fumiaki Imamura | | | | | |
| Shinji Imanaka | | | | | |
| Takahiro Imanami | | | | | |
| Ryota Imanari | | | | | |
| Makoto Imaoka | | | | | |
| Masaru Imazeki | | | | | |
| Naoki Imoto | | | | | |
| Ryuya Ina | | | | | |
| Atsunori Inaba | | | | | |
| Naoto Inada | | | | | |
| Homare Inamine | | | | | |
| Shigeo Inamine | | | | | |
| Kazuhisa Inao | | | | | |
| Pete Incaviglia | | | | | |
| Suguru Ino | | | | | |
| Toshiharu Inokawa | | | | | |
| Goichi Inokubo | | | | | |
| Takashi Inomata | | | | | |
| Yoshiharu Inotsume | | | | | |
| Jun Inoue | | | | | |
| Kazuki Inoue | | | | | |
| Koichi Inoue | | | | | |
| Koji Inoue | | | | | |
| Shinji Inoue | | | | | |
| Takao Inoue | | | | | |
| Yuuji Inoue | | | | | |
| Toshiaki Inubushi | | | | | |
| Tomoya Inzen | | | | | |
| Takamitsu Ioh | | | | | |
| Hideki Irabu | | | | | |
| Satoshi Iriki | | | | | |
| Yusaku Iriki | | | | | |
| Hisahiko Irino | | | | | |
| Naoto Ishibashi | | | | | |
| Takashi Ishida | | | | | |
| Katsutoshi Ishidoh | | | | | |
| Hiromichi Ishige | | | | | |
| Hiroshi Ishige | | | | | |
| Yoshiyuki Ishihara | | | | | |
| Hiroo Ishii | | | | | |
| Hirotoshi Ishii | | | | | |
| Kazuhisa Ishii | | | | | |
| Takashi Ishii | | | | | |
| Takehiro Ishii | | | | | |
| Takuro Ishii | | | | | |
| Yoshihito Ishii | | | | | |
| Yuya Ishii | | | | | |
| Masami Ishikawa | | | | | |
| Masanori Ishikawa | | | | | |
| Satoru Ishikawa | | | | | |
| Shunsuke Ishikawa | | | | | |
| Takehiro Ishikawa | | | | | |
| Kazuhiko Ishimine | | | | | |
| Tadashi Ishimine | | | | | |
| Shuichi Ishimoto | | | | | |
| Tsutomu Ishimoto | | | | | |
| Yutaka Ishimoto | | | | | |
| Hiroomi Ishinuki | | | | | |
| Tsuneyuki Iso | | | | | |
| Koichi Isobe | | | | | |
| Yasuhiro Itakura | | | | | |
| Akimitsu Itoh | | | | | |
| Akira Itoh | | | | | |
| Atsunori Itoh | | | | | |
| Eisuke Itoh | | | | | |
| Hidenori Itoh | | | | | |
| Hikaru Itoh | | | | | |
| Hiroyasu Itoh | | | | | |
| Makoto Itoh | | | | | |
| Takahide Itoh | | | | | |
| Takeshi Itoh | | | | | |
| Tomohito Itoh | | | | | |
| Tsutomu Itoh | | | | | |
| Yoshihiro Itoh | | | | | |
| Yoshio Itoi | | | | | |
| Keisaku Itokazu | | | | | |
| Manabu Iwadate | | | | | |
| Hisashi Iwakuma | | | | | |
| Morimichi Iwamoto | | | | | |
| Takashi Iwamoto | | | | | |
| Tsutomu Iwamoto | | | | | |
| Yoshiyuki Iwamoto | | | | | |
| Akinori Iwamura | | | | | |
| Takashi Iwamura | | | | | |
| Hisanori Iwasaki | | | | | |
| Satoshi Iwasaki | | | | | |
| Sho Iwasaki | | | | | |
| Tatsuro Iwasaki | | | | | |
| Tetsuya Iwasaki | | | | | |
| Hitoki Iwase | | | | | |
| Shuichi Iwashita | | | | | |
| Minoru Iwata | | | | | |
| Tooru Iwata | | | | | |
| Kazunori Iyoda | | | | | |
| Takateru Iyono | | | | | |
| Masayoshi Izumi | | | | | |
