= Golden Spirit Award =

- Native name: ゴールデンスピリット賞
- Description: Recognizing outstanding community service by an NPB player
- Country: Japan
- Presented by: Hochi Shimbun (Sports Hochi)
- Website: hochi.news/feature/golden-spirit/

The Golden Spirit Award is given annually to the Nippon Professional Baseball (NPB) player recognizing outstanding contributions to one's community, as voted on by members of the media.

== Award winners ==
Year	Links to the corresponding Nippon Professional Baseball season
1B	First baseman
2B	Second baseman
3B	Third baseman
C	Catcher
DH	Designated hitter
OF	Outfielder
P	Pitcher
SS	Shortstop

Year	Player	Team	League	Position
1999	Hideki Matsui	Yomiuri Giants	Central	OF
2000	Atsushi Kataoka	Nippon-Ham Fighters	Pacific	IF
2001	Norihiro Nakamura	Osaka Kintetsu Buffaloes	Pacific	3B
2002	Tetsuya Iida	Yakult Swallows	Central	OF
2003	Kazuki Inoue	Chunichi Dragons	Central	OF
2004	Norihiro Akahoshi	Hanshin Tigers	Central	OF
2005	Bobby Valentine	Chiba Lotte Marines	Pacific	Coach
2006	Tsuyoshi Wada	Fukuoka SoftBank Hawks	Pacific	P
2007	Daisuke Miura	Yokohama BayStars	Central	P
2008	Hisashi Iwakuma	Tohoku Rakuten Golden Eagles	Pacific	P
2009	Michihiro Ogasawara	Yomiuri Giants	Central	IF
2010	Yu Darvish	Hokkaido Nippon-Ham Fighters	Pacific	P
2011	Takeshi Yamasaki	Tohoku Rakuten Golden Eagles	Pacific	1B, OF
2012	Kyuji Fujikawa	Hanshin Tigers	Central	P
2013	Shinya Miyamoto	Tokyo Yakult Swallows	Central	SS
2014	Takumi Kuriyama	Saitama Seibu Lions	Pacific	OF
2015	Toshiaki Imae	Chiba Lotte Marines	Pacific	IF
2016	Tetsuya Utsumi	Yomiuri Giants	Central	P
2017	Minoru Iwata	Hanshin Tigers	Central	P
2018	Tadahito Iguchi	Chiba Lotte Marines	Pacific	Manager
2018	Sadaharu Oh	Fukuoka SoftBank Hawks	Pacific	Executive
2018	Sadaaki Yoshimura	Yomiuri Giants	Central	Coach
2019	Shogo Akiyama	Saitama Seibu Lions	Pacific	OF
2021	Akihiro Yano	Hanshin Tigers	Central	Manager
2022	Masataka Yoshida	Orix Buffaloes	Pacific	OF
2023	Naoki Miyanishi	Hokkaido Nippon-Ham Fighters	Pacific	P
2024	Tomoyuki Sugano	Yomiuri Giants	Central	P

== See also ==
- Roberto Clemente Award
- Nippon Professional Baseball § Awards
- Baseball awards § Japan
- List of Nippon Professional Baseball ERA champions
