= Fuminori =

- Gender: Male

Origin
- Origin: Japanese
- Meaning: Different meanings depending on the kanji used

Fuminori (written: 文紀, 文則, 史学, 史規 or 史法) is a masculine Japanese given name. Notable people with the name include:

- Fuminori Komatsu (小松 史法; born 1978), Japanese voice actor
- Fuminori Nakamura (中村 文則; born 1977), Japanese writer
- Fuminori Tsushima (対馬 文紀; born 1969), Japanese bobsledder
- Fuminori Ujihara (宇治原 史規; born 1976), Japanese comedian
- Fuminori Yokogawa (横川 史学; born 1984), Japanese baseball player

== Fictional Characters ==
- Fuminori Sakisaka (匂坂郁紀), the main character of the visual novel Saya no Uta
