= Ishimine =

Ishimine (written: 石嶺 or 伊志嶺) is a Japanese surname. Notable people with the surname include:

- Satoko Ishimine (石嶺 聡子, born 1975), Japanese singer-songwriter
- Shota Ishimine (伊志嶺 翔大, born 1988), Japanese baseball player
- Tadashi Ishimine (伊志嶺 忠, born 1985), Japanese baseball player
