= Aikyō =

Aikyō (Japanese: 愛敬) is a family name of Japanese origin that may refer to:

- Hisashi Aikyoh (愛敬 尚史; born 1976), Japanese former baseball player
- Shigeyuki Aikyo (愛敬 重之; born 1964), Japanese steeplechase runner
