= Fumikazu Takanami =

Japanese baseball player (born 1975)

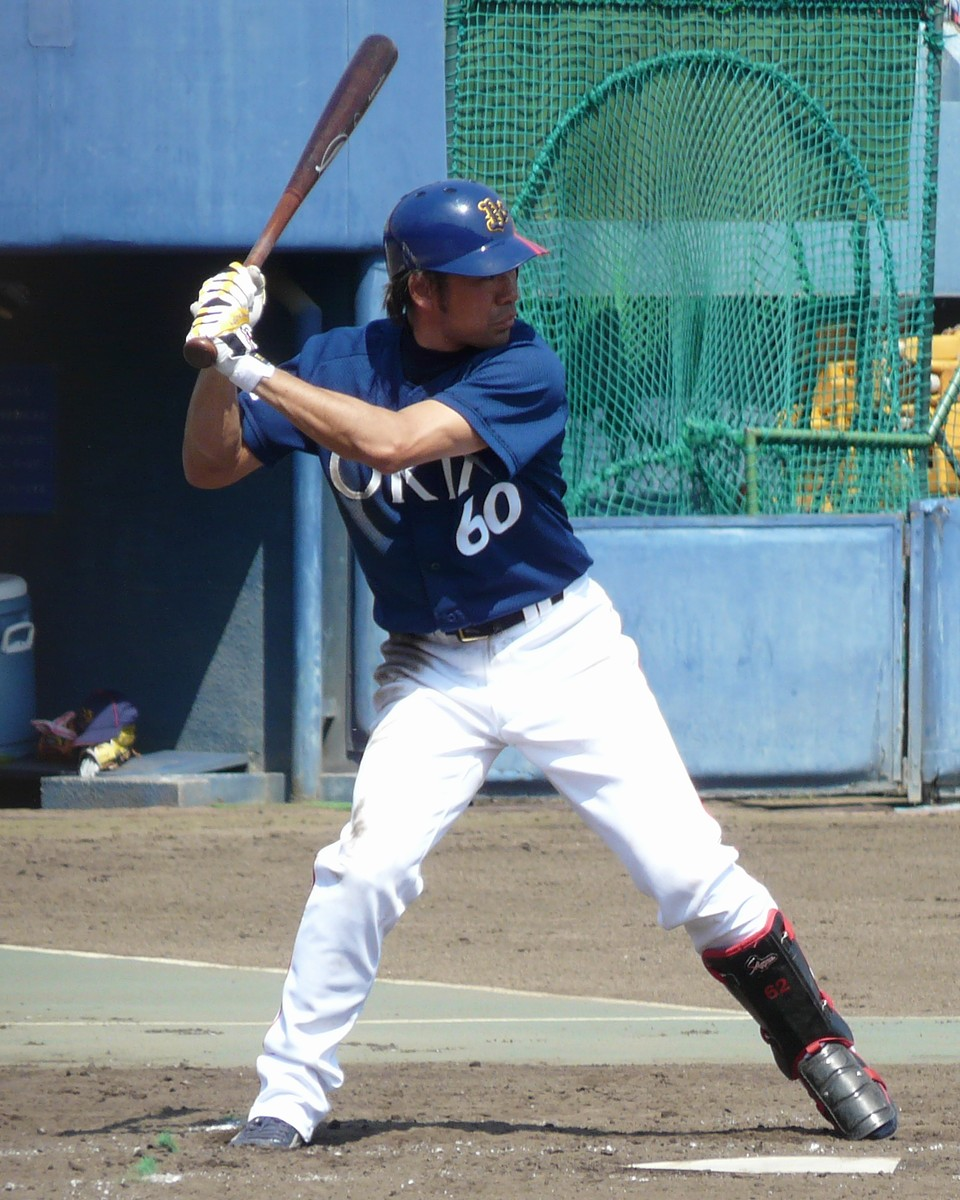
- Takanami's active player era with the Orix Buffaloes in 2009.

Fukuoka SoftBank Hawks – No. 98
- Outfielder / Coach
- Born: November 3, 1975 (age 50); Ushibuka, Kumamoto, Japan
- Batted: Right Threw: Right

NPB debut
- May 20, 1995, for the Hanshin Tigers

Last NPB appearance
- July 30, 2009, for the Orix Buffaloes

NPB statistics
- Batting average: .169
- Home runs: 2
- RBI: 26
- Stolen base: 59

Teams
- As player: Hanshin Tigers (1994–2003); Seibu Lions (2003–2006); Tohoku Rakuten Golden Eagles (2007–2008); Orix Buffaloes (2009); As coach: Fukuoka SoftBank Hawks (2012–2013, 2017–2018, 2023–present)

Career highlights and awards
- As player: Japan Series champion (2004); As coach: Japan Series champion (2025)

Fumikazu Takanami (高波 文一, Takanami Fumikazu; born November 3, 1975) is a Japanese former professional baseball outfielder, and current third squad outfield defense and base running coach for the Fukuoka SoftBank Hawks of Nippon Professional Baseball (NPB). He played in NPB for the Hanshin Tigers, Seibu Lions, Tohoku Rakuten Golden Eagles, and Orix Buffaloes.

== Professional career ==
=== Active player era ===
On November 20, 1993, Takanami was drafted third overall by the Hanshin Tigers in the 1993 Nippon Professional Baseball draft.

In 1995 season, He made his debut in the Central League, playing 52 games.

He played seven seasons with the Tigers and was traded to the Seibu Lions for the 2003 season.

Takanami then played four seasons with the Lions before moving to the Tohoku Rakuten Golden Eagles for two seasons and the Orix Buffaloes for one season.

Takanami then played four seasons with the Lions before moving to the Tohoku Rakuten Golden Eagles for two seasons and the Orix Buffaloes for one season, and he retired during the 2009 season.

He totaled 628 games in 13 seasons, with a .169 batting average, two home runs, 69 hitss, 26 RBI, and 59 stolen bases.

=== After retirement ===
After his retirement, Takanami joined the Fukuoka SoftBank Hawks farm team staff in the 2010 season and served as the outfield defense and base coach for the second and third squad in the 2012 season and the third squad in the 2013 season.

He also worked for the Hawks' Baseball Promotion Department from the 2014 to 2016 seasons and again from the 2017 to 2018 seasons as the third squad outfield defense and base coach.

From the 2019 season through the 2022 season he served as the assistant dormitory master for the Hawks players' dormitory and rehabilitation staff in charge of fielders.

He will serve as the forth squad outfield defense and base coach beginning with the 2023 season.

On December 2, 2023, he was transferred to the third squad outfield defense and base running coach.
