= Yutaka Nakamura (baseball) =

Japanese baseball player (born 1973)

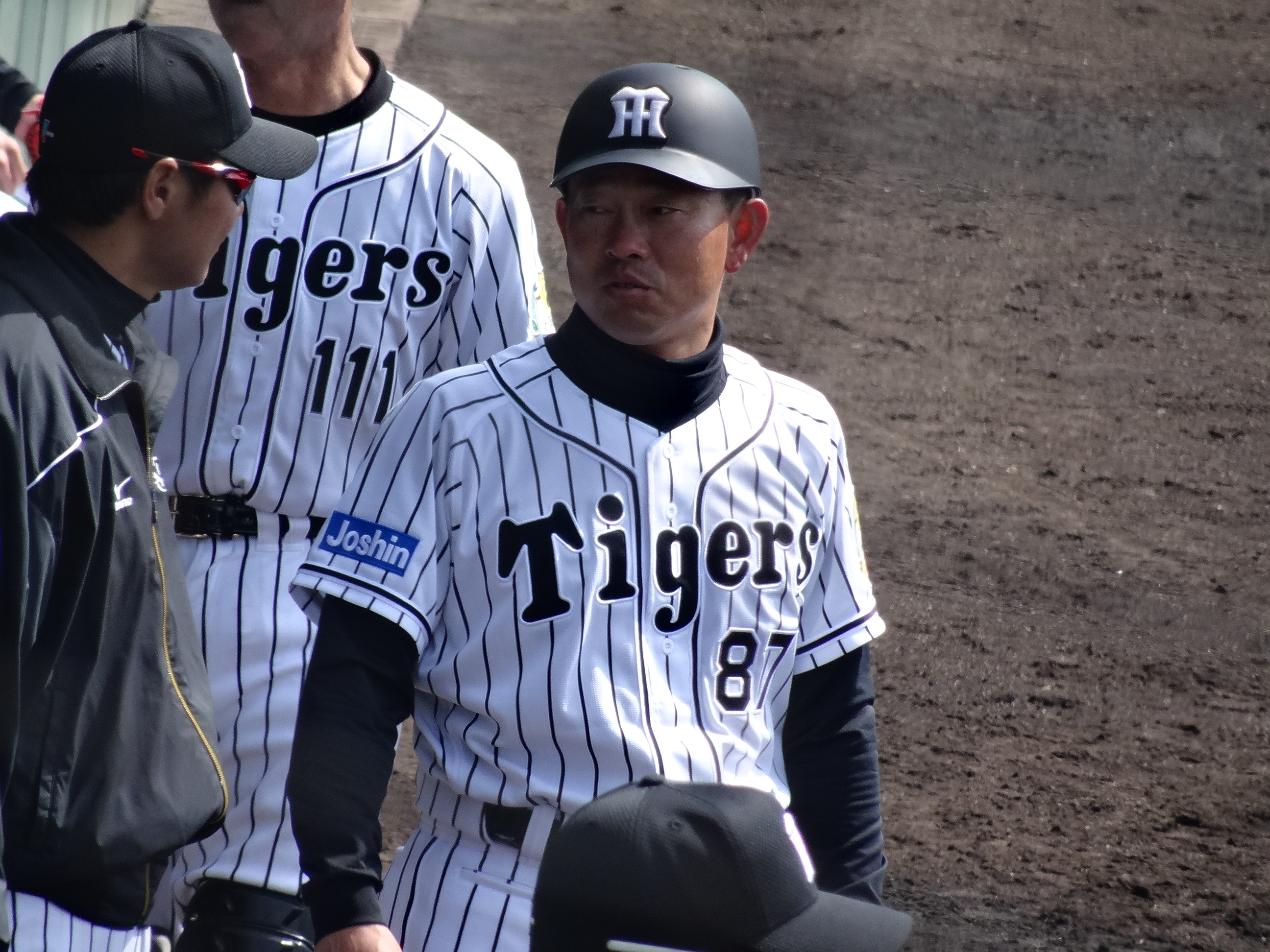

Chunichi Dragons – No. 89
- Outfielder / Coach
- Born: April 23, 1973 (age 53); Sakai, Osaka, Japan
- Batted: Right Threw: Right

NPB debut
- March 31, 1996, for the Nippon Ham Fighters

Last appearance
- October 1, 2007, for the Hanshin Tigers

NPB statistics
- Batting average: .248
- Hits: 176
- Home runs: 8
- Runs batted in: 63
- Stolen base: 12

Teams
- As player: Nippon Ham Fighters (1996–2002); Hanshin Tigers (2003–2007); As coach: Hanshin Tigers (2008–2021); Chunichi Dragons (2022–present)

Yutaka Nakamura (中村 豊, Nakamura Yutaka; born April 23, 1973 in Sakai, Osaka) is a retired Japanese professional outfielder.
