= Teppei Tsuchiya =

Japanese baseball player and coach (born 1982)

Teppei Tsuchiya 鉄平
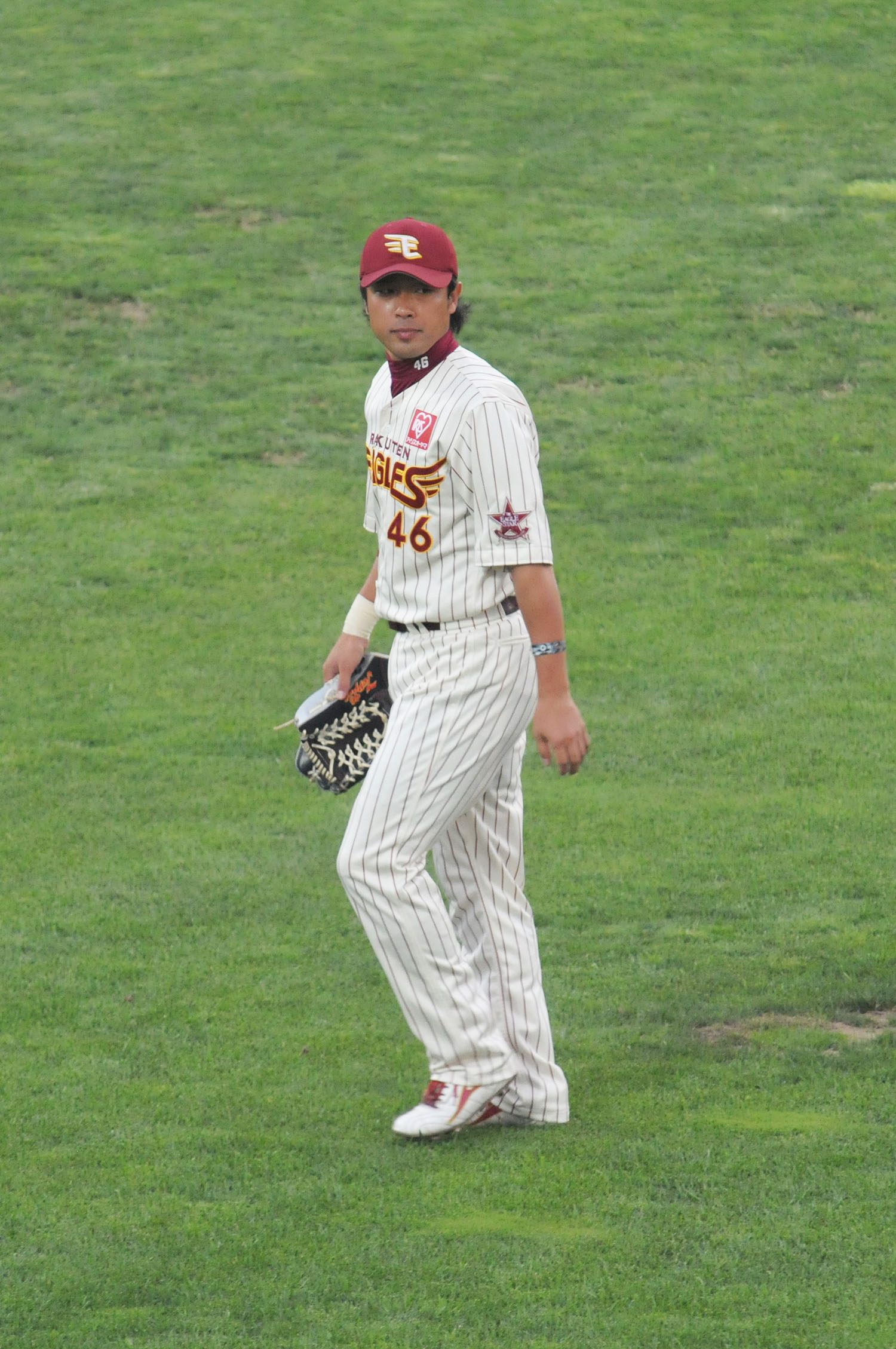
- Teppei with the Tohoku Rakuten Golden Eagles
- Outfielder / Coach
- Born: December 27, 1982 (age 43)
- Batted: Left Threw: Right

NPB debut
- April 30, 2004, for the Chunichi Dragons

Last NPB appearance
- July 12, 2015, for the Orix Buffaloes

NPB statistics (through 2015 season)
- Batting average: .278
- Hits: 878
- Home runs: 42
- RBIs: 340
- Stolen bases: 68
- Stats at Baseball Reference

Teams
- As player: Chunichi Dragons (2001–2005); Tohoku Rakuten Golden Eagles (2006–2013); Orix Buffaloes (2014–2015); As coach: Tohoku Rakuten Golden Eagles (2019–2021)

Career highlights and awards
- 2× NPB All-Star (2007, 2010); 1× Best Nine Award (2009); 1× Batting Champion (2009)

Teppei Tsuchiya (土谷 鉄平, born December 27, 1982, in Ōita, Ōita) also known as Teppei (鉄平) is a Japanese professional baseball infielder.

Teppei announced his retirement on January 26, 2016.
