= Shinji Niinuma =

Japanese baseball player and coach (born 1979)

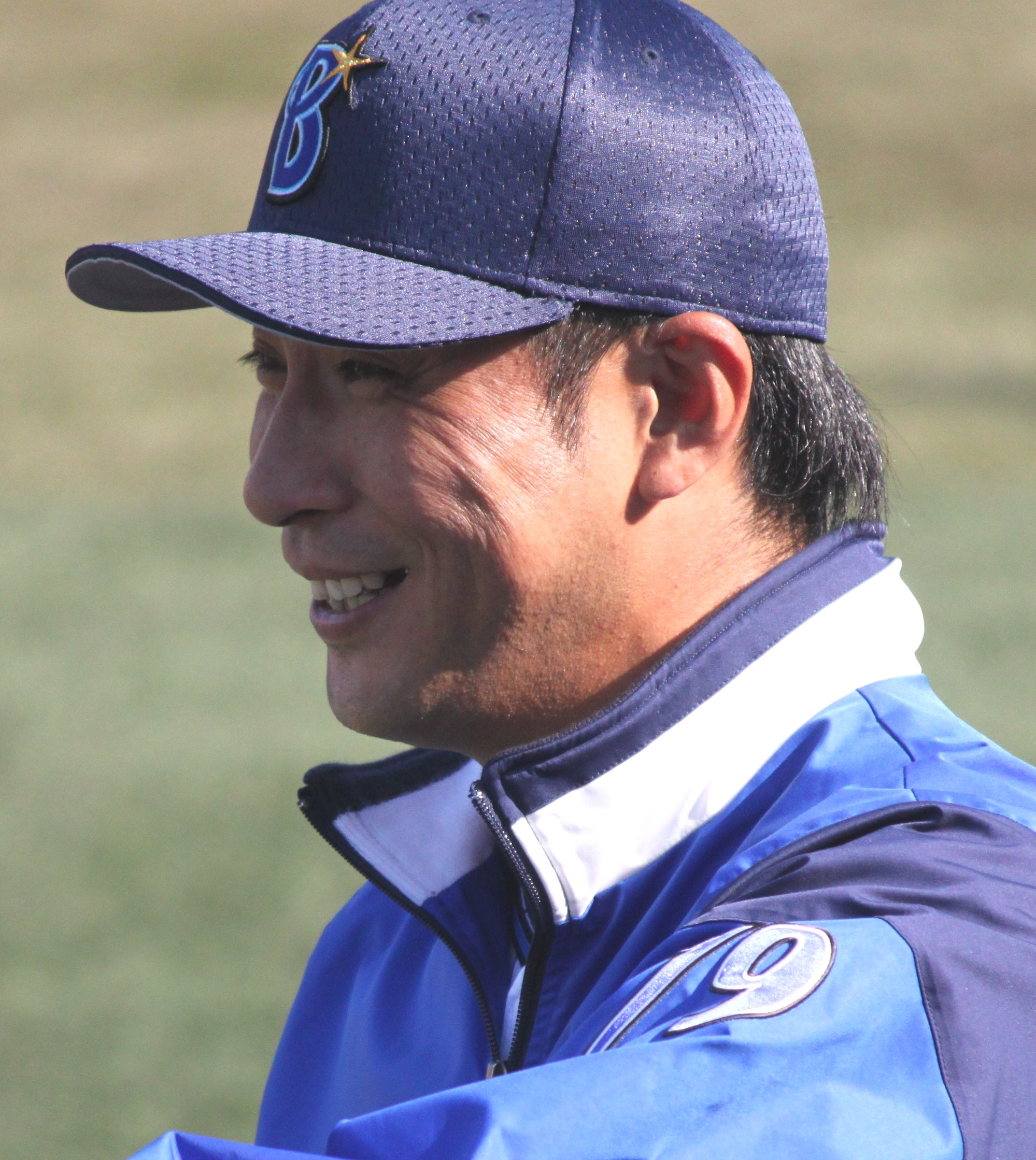
- Catcher / Coach
- Born: June 22, 1979; Ishinomaki, Miyagi, Japan
- Batted: Right Threw: Right

NPB debut
- October 7, 2003, for the Yokohama BayStars

Last appearance
- October 8, 2012, for the Yokohama DeNA BayStars

NPB statistics (through 2012)
- Batting average: .195
- Hits: 42
- Home runs: 4
- Runs batted in: 14
- Stolen base: 0

Teams
- As player: Yokohama BayStars / Yokohama DeNA BayStars (1998–2012); As coach: Yokohama DeNA BayStars (2013–2015, 2018–2021)

Shinji Niinuma (新沼 慎二, Niinuma Shinji; born June 22, 1979 in Ishinomaki, Miyagi, Japan) is a Japanese former Nippon Professional Baseball catcher.
