= Daisuke Kusano =

Japanese baseball player and coach (born 1976)

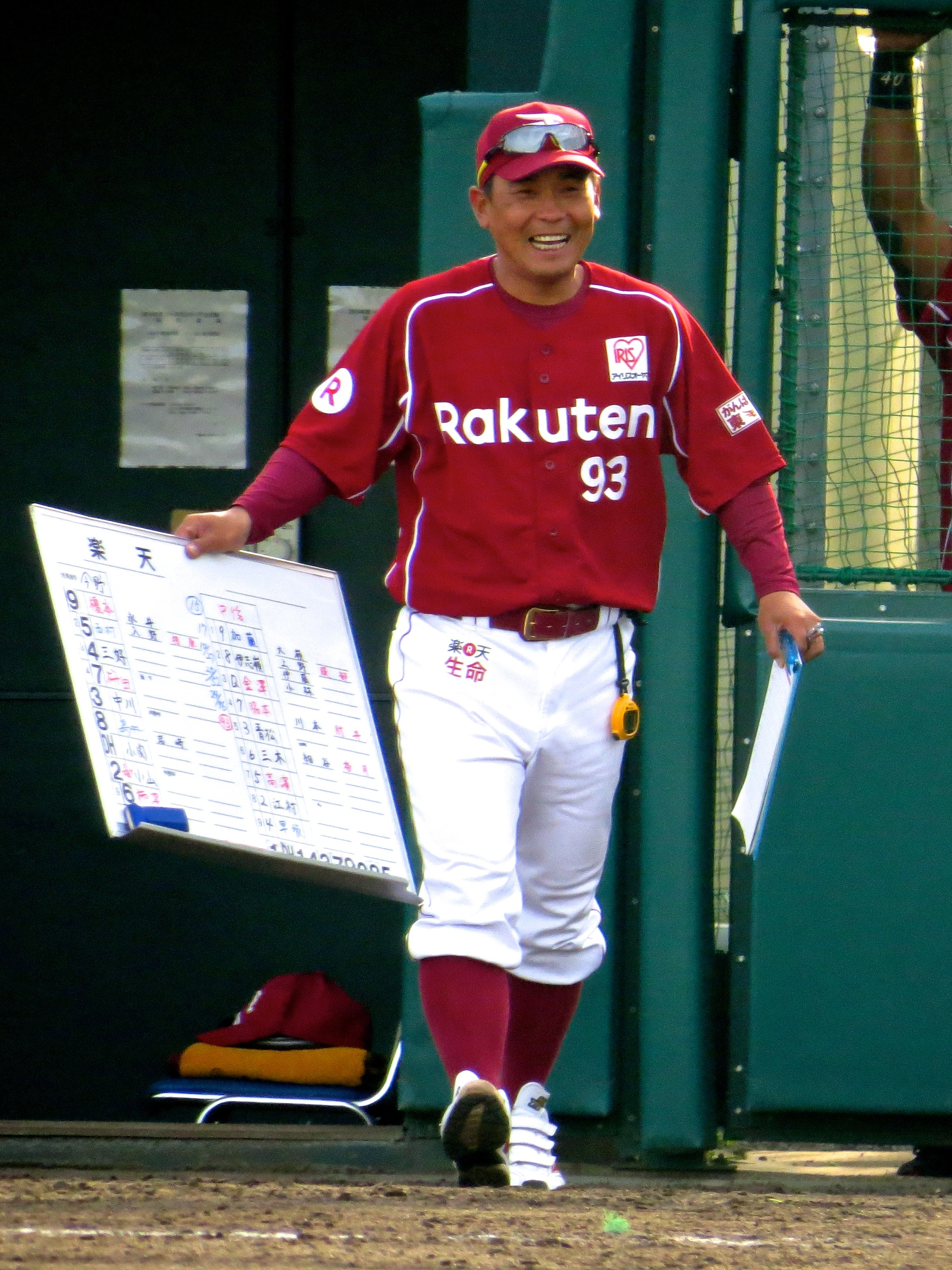
- Kusano with the Tohoku Rakuten Golden Eagles
- Infielder / Coach
- Born: December 4, 1976 (age 49); Miyazaki, Japan
- Bats: Left Throws: Right

NPB debut
- March 26, 2006, for the Tohoku Rakuten Golden Eagles

NPB statistics (through 2008 season)
- Batting average: .285
- Hits: 220
- Runs batted in: 82

Teams
- As player: Tohoku Rakuten Golden Eagles (2006 – 2012); As coach: Tohoku Rakuten Golden Eagles (2014 – 2016)
Medals
Men's baseball
Representing Japan
Baseball World Cup
Bronze medal – third place	2003 Cuba	National team
- Last updated on: 19 April 2020

Daisuke Kusano (草野 大輔, Kusano Daisuke; born December 4, 1976) is a Nippon Professional Baseball player for the Tohoku Rakuten Golden Eagles in Japan's Pacific League. He played for the Japan squad at the 2005 Baseball World Cup, held in the Netherlands.
