= Shinji Inoue (baseball) =

Japanese baseball player (born 1966)

- Outfielder / Coach
- Born: July 12, 1966; Tamana District, Kumamoto, Japan
- Batted: Right Threw: Right

NPB debut
- October 9, 1985, for the Yomiuri Giants

Last appearance
- August 20, 1997, for the Yomiuri Giants

NPB statistics (through 1998)
- Batting average: .253
- Hits: 112
- Home runs: 16
- Runs batted in: 60
- Stolen base: 5
- Stats at Baseball Reference

Teams
- As player: Yomiuri Giants (1985–1998); As coach: Yomiuri Giants (2001–2006, 2016, 2019–2020)

Career highlights and awards
- 1× NPB All-Star (1989); 2× Japan Series champion (1989, 1994)
- Last updated on: 5 May 2020

Shinji Inoue (井上 真二, Inoue Shinji; born July 12, 1966 in Tamana District, Kumamoto, Japan) is a Japanese former Nippon Professional Baseball outfielder.
