= Naoto Watanabe =

Japanese baseball player and coach (born 1980)

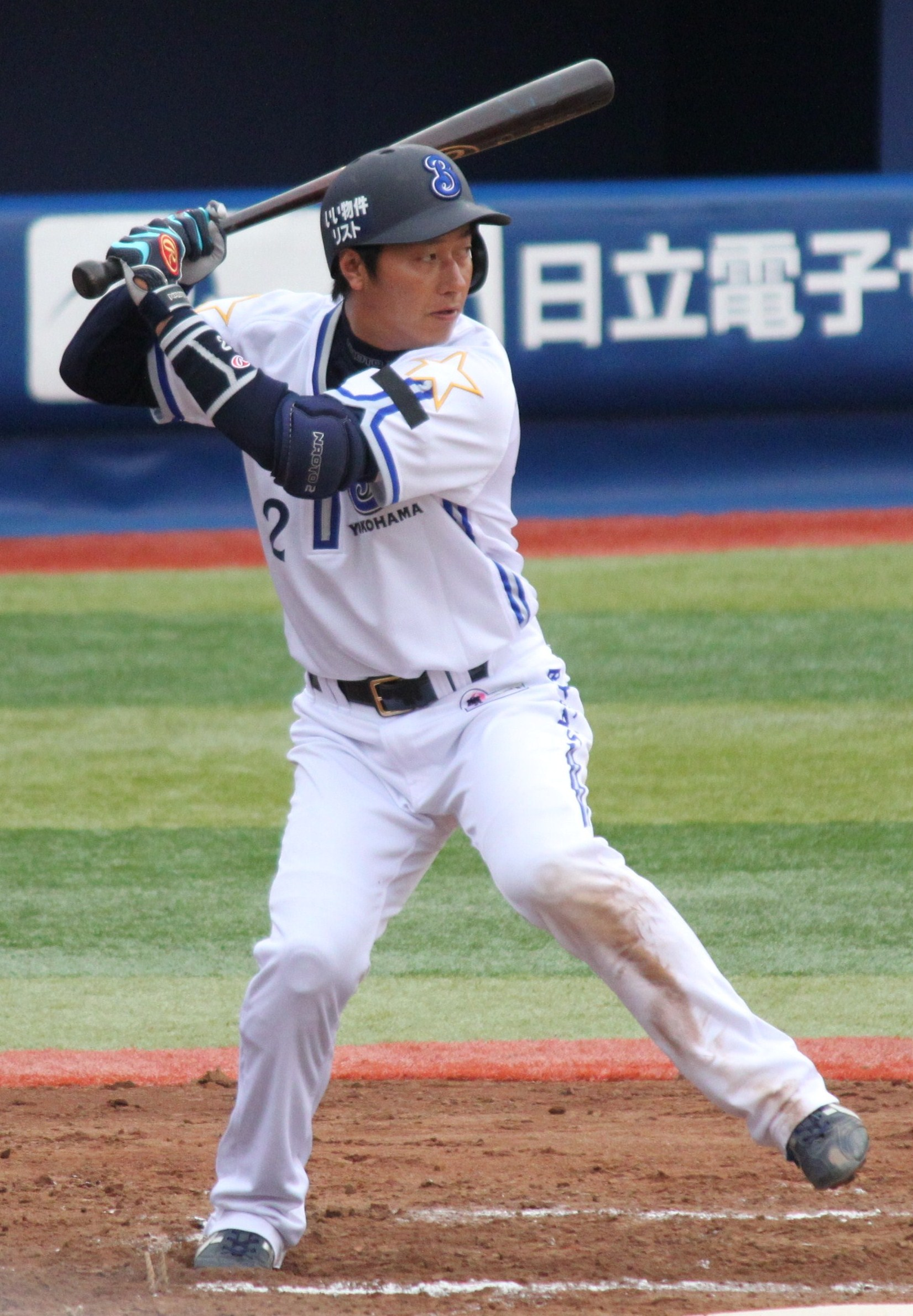
- Watanabe with the Yokohama BayStars

Tohoku Rakuten Golden Eagles – No. 26
- Infielder / Coach
- Born: October 15, 1980 (age 45); Ibaraki, Japan
- Bats: Right Throws: Right

NPB debut
- April 17, 2007, for the Tohoku Rakuten Golden Eagles

NPB statistics
- Batting average: .259
- Hits: 855
- Runs batted in: 229
- Stolen bases: 115
- Stats at Baseball Reference

Teams
- As player: Tohoku Rakuten Golden Eagles (2007–2010); Yokohama BayStars/Yokohama DeNA BayStars (2011–2013); Saitama Seibu Lions (2013–2017); Tohoku Rakuten Golden Eagles (2018–2020); As coach: Tohoku Rakuten Golden Eagles (2020–present)

Career highlights and awards
- NPB All-Star (2011)

Naoto Watanabe (渡辺 直人, Watanabe Naoto; born October 15, 1980) is a Japanese former professional baseball infielder who currently serves as a coach for the Tohoku Rakuten Golden Eagles of Nippon Professional Baseball (NPB). He played in NPB for the Golden Eagles, Yokohama BayStars/Yokohama DeNA BayStars, and Saitama Seibu Lions.

== Career ==
Tohoku Rakuten Golden Eagles selected Watanabe with the fifth selection in the 2006 NPB draft.

On April 7, 2007, Watanabe made his NPB debut.

On October 14, 2019, Watanabe become playing batting coach for the Tohoku Rakuten Golden Eagles of NPB.

On September 12, 2020, Watanabe announced his retirement after the season, and next day he held press conference.
