= Yuji Yoshioka =

Japanese baseball player (born 1971)

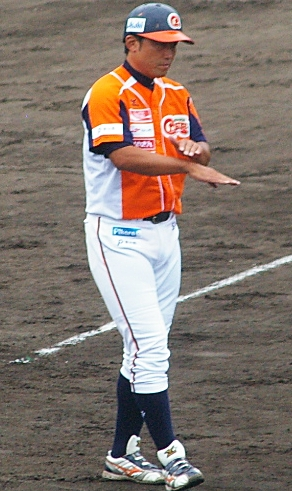

Tokyo Yakult Swallows – No. 80
- Infielder / Coach / Manager
- Born: July 29, 1971 (age 54); Adachi, Tokyo, Japan
- Batted: Right Threw: Right

NPB debut
- October 2, 1993, for the Yomiuri Giants

Last NPB appearance
- August 30, 2008, for the Tohoku Rakuten Golden Eagles

NPB statistics (through 2008 season)
- Batting average: .273
- Hits: 883
- RBIs: 463
- Stolen bases: 28
- Stats at Baseball Reference

Teams
- As player: Yomiuri Giants (1990–1996); Kintetsu Buffaloes/Osaka Kintetsu Buffaloes (1997–2004); Tohoku Rakuten Golden Eagles (2005–2008); As manager: Toyama Thunderbirds (2014–2017, 2021-present); As coach: Ehime Mandarin Pirates (2011–2013); Hokkaido Nippon-Ham Fighters (2018–2020); Tokyo Yakult Swallows (2025–)

Career highlights and awards
- 1× NPB All-Star (2002)
- Last updated on: December 21, 2024

Yuji Yoshioka (吉岡 雄二, Yoshioka Yuji; born July 29, 1971) is a former Nippon Professional Baseball infielder and the current coach of the Tokyo Yakult Swallows.。
