= Jin Nakatani =

Japanese baseball player (born 1979)

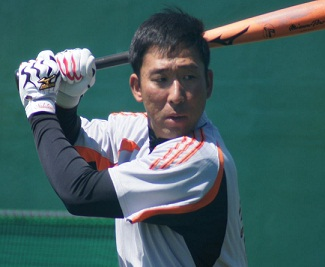

Free agent
- Catcher
- Born: May 5, 1979 (age 47); Wakayama, Wakayama
- Bats: Right Throws: Right

NPB debut
- 2002, for the Hanshin Tigers

NPB statistics (through 2012)
- Batting average: .162
- Home runs: 4
- Runs batted in: 17
- Stats at Baseball Reference

Teams
- Hanshin Tigers (2002); Tohoku Rakuten Golden Eagles (2006, 2008–2011); Yomiuri Giants (2012)

Jin Nakatani (中谷 仁, born May 5, 1979) is a Japanese former professional baseball catcher in Nippon Professional Baseball (NPB). He played for the Hanshin Tigers in 2002, the Tohoku Rakuten Golden Eagles in 2006, and from 2008 to 2011 and for the Yomiuri Giants in 2012. Following his retirement from the NPB, he managed at the Chiben Wakayama High School baseball team.
