= Yoshiyuki Noguchi =

Japanese baseball player (born 1981)

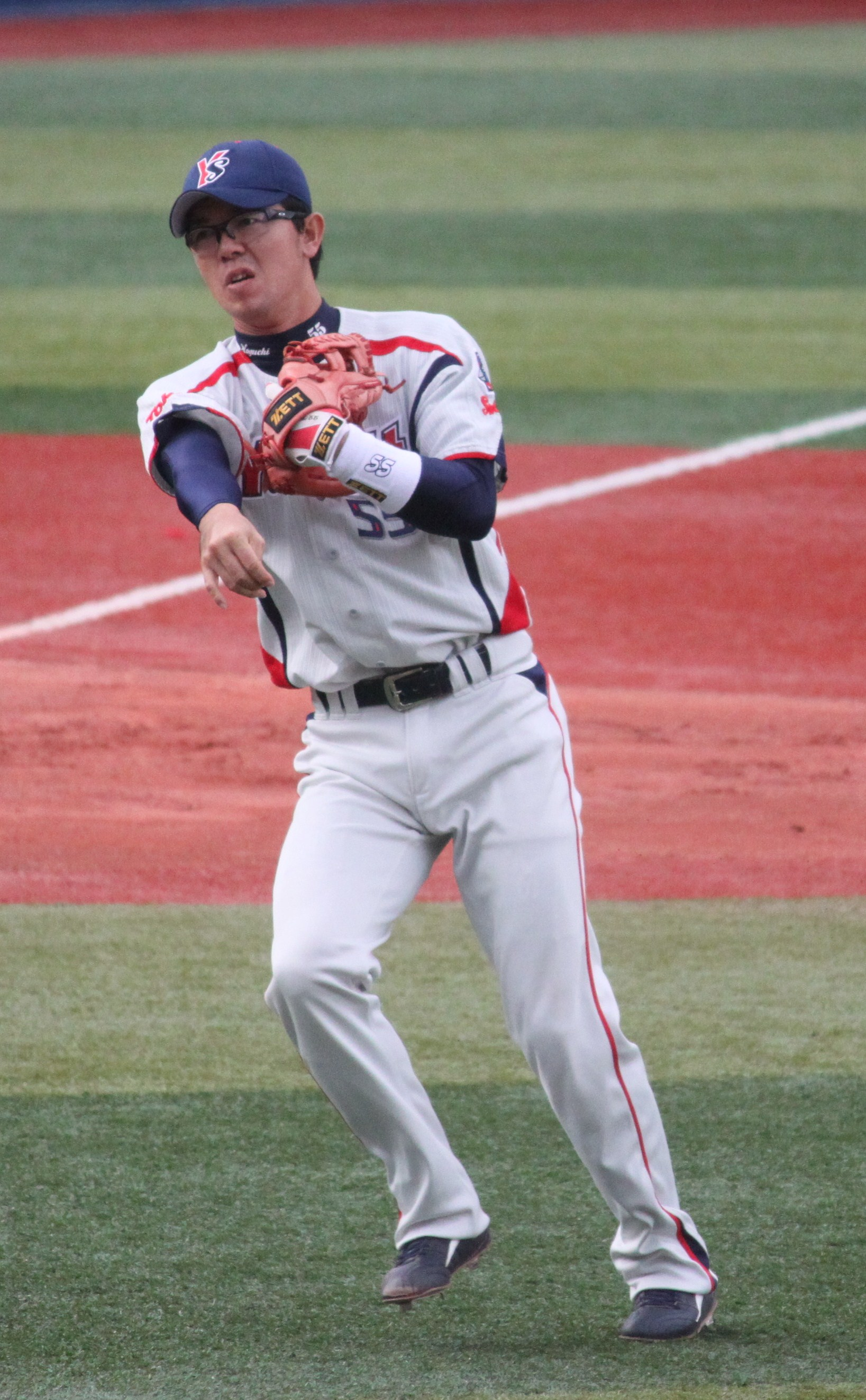
- Infielder
- Born: May 16, 1981 (age 44); Niihari District, Ibaraki, Japan
- Bats: Right Throws: Right

debut
- September 13, 2002, for the Yakult Swallows
- Stats at Baseball Reference

Teams
- Yakult Swallows/Tokyo Yakult Swallows (2000–2014)

Yoshiyuki Noguchi (野口 祥順, Noguchi Yoshiyuki; born May 16, 1981 in Niihari District, Ibaraki, Japan) is a professional Japanese baseball player.
