= Akihito Fujii =

Japanese baseball player (born 1976)

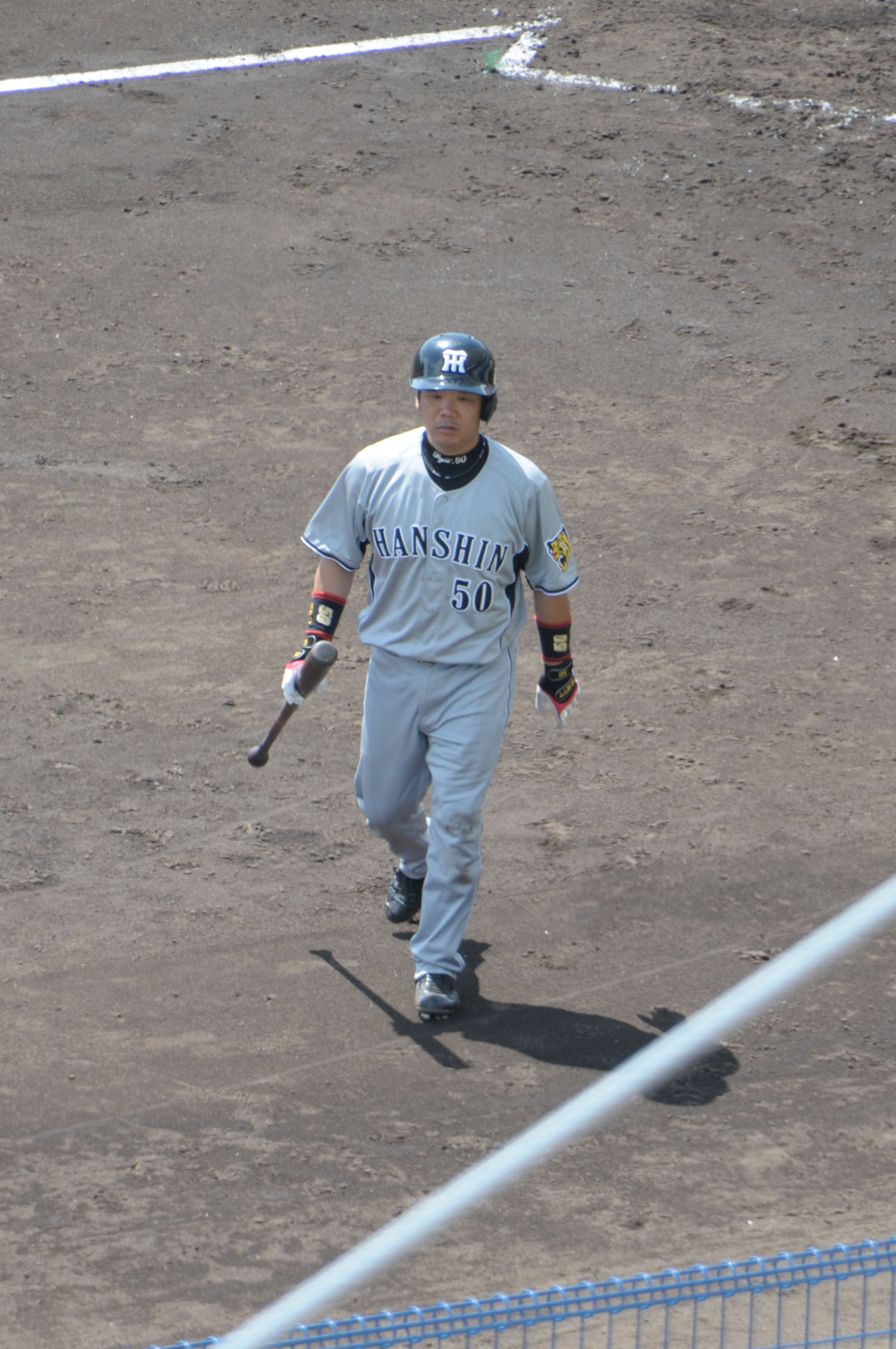
- Fujii with the Hanshin Tigers

Hiroshima Toyo Carp – No. 77
- Catcher/Coach
- Born: November 26, 1985 (age 40); Higashiōsaka, Osaka, Japan
- Bats: Right Throws: Right

NPB debut
- 1999, for the Osaka Kintetsu Buffaloes

NPB statistics (through 2015)
- Batting average: .236
- Home runs: 10
- RBI: 173
- Stats at Baseball Reference

Teams
- As player: Osaka Kintetsu Buffaloes (1999–2004); Tohoku Rakuten Golden Eagles (2005–2010); Hanshin Tigers (2011–2015); As coach: Fukui Miracle Elephants (2016); Hanshin Tigers (2017–2022); Hiroshima Toyo Carp (2023–)

Akihito Fujii (藤井 彰人, Fujii Akihito; born June 18, 1976) is a Japanese former professional baseball catcher and current coach for the Hanshin Tigers in Japan's Nippon Professional Baseball. He previously played for the Osaka Kintetsu Buffaloes from 1999 to 2004 and the Tohoku Rakuten Golden Eagles from 2005 to 2010 and the Tigers from 2011 to 2015.
