= Yoshinori Okihara =

Japanese baseball player and coach (born 1972)

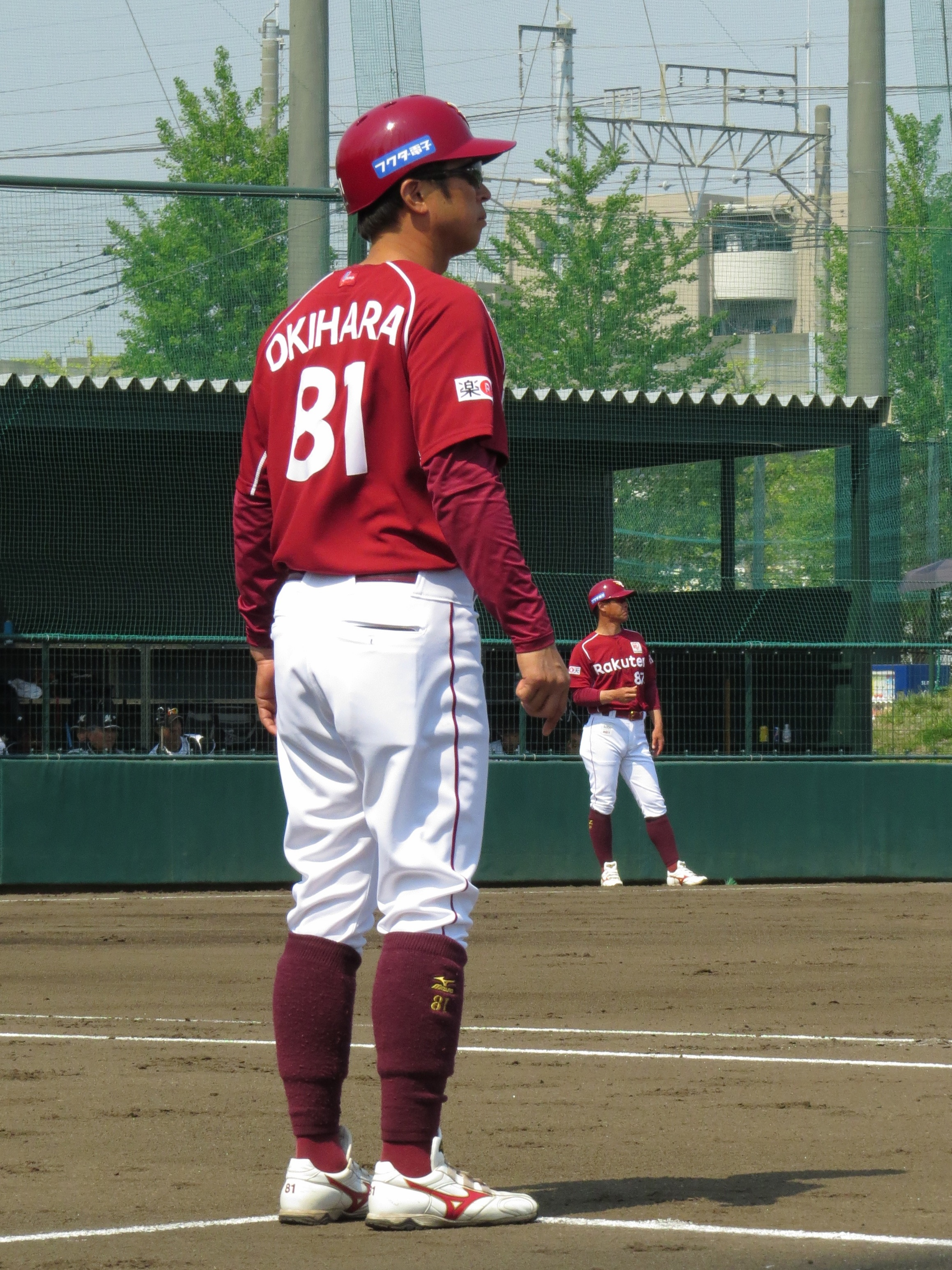
- Infielder / Coach
- Born: July 27, 1972 (age 53); Matsuyama, Ehime
- Batted: Right Threw: Right

NPB debut
- March 30, 2001, for the Hanshin Tigers

Last NPB appearance
- August 20, 2006, for the Tohoku Rakuten Golden Eagles

NPB statistics (through 2006)
- Batting average: .256
- Home runs: 8
- Hits: 253

Teams
- As player: Hanshin Tigers (2001–2005); Tohoku Rakuten Golden Eagles (2005–2006); As coach: Tohoku Rakuten Golden Eagles (2013–2014)
- Last updated on: 11 January 2016

Yoshinori Okihara (沖原 佳典, born July 27, 1972, in Matsuyama, Ehime, Japan) is a former Nippon Professional Baseball infielder.
