= Fuminori Yokogawa =

Japanese baseball player

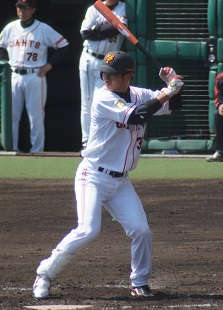
- Outfielder / Coach
- Born: December 3, 1984 (age 41); Chiba, Chiba, Japan
- Bats: Left Throws: Right

NPB debut
- May 5, 2008, for the Tohoku Rakuten Golden Eagles

NPB statistics (through 2014)
- Batting average: .216
- Home runs: 9
- RBI: 40
- Stats at Baseball Reference

Teams
- As player: Tohoku Rakuten Golden Eagles (2007–2012); Yomiuri Giants (2013–2015); As coach: Yomiuri Giants (2022)

Fuminori Yokogawa (横川 史学, Yokogawa Fuminori; born December 3, 1984) is a Japanese professional baseball outfielder for the Yomiuri Giants in Japan's Nippon Professional Baseball.
