= Suguru Ino =

Japanese baseball player (born 1983)

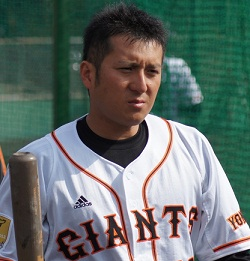
- Ino with the Yomiuri Giants

Tohoku Rakuten Golden Eagles – No. 93
- Catcher / Coach
- Born: November 23, 1983 (age 42); Maebashi, Gunma, Japan
- Batted: Right Threw: Right

debut
- September 30, 2007, for the Tohoku Rakuten Golden Eagles

Last appearance
- October 7, 2020, for the Tokyo Yakult Swallows

NPB statistics
- Batting average: .142
- Home runs: 0
- Runs batted in: 13
- Stats at Baseball Reference

Teams
- As player: Tohoku Rakuten Golden Eagles (2007–2012); Yomiuri Giants (2013–2014); Tokyo Yakult Swallows (2015–2020); As coach: Tokyo Yakult Swallows (2025); Tohoku Rakuten Golden Eagles (2026-present)

Suguru Ino (井野 卓, Ino Suguru; born November 23, 1983) is a Japanese former professional baseball catcher. He has played in Nippon Professional Baseball (NPB) for the Tohoku Rakuten Golden Eagles, Yomiuri Giants and Tokyo Yakult Swallows.

On November 2, Ino announced his retirement.
