= Satoshi Nagai =

Japanese baseball player and coach

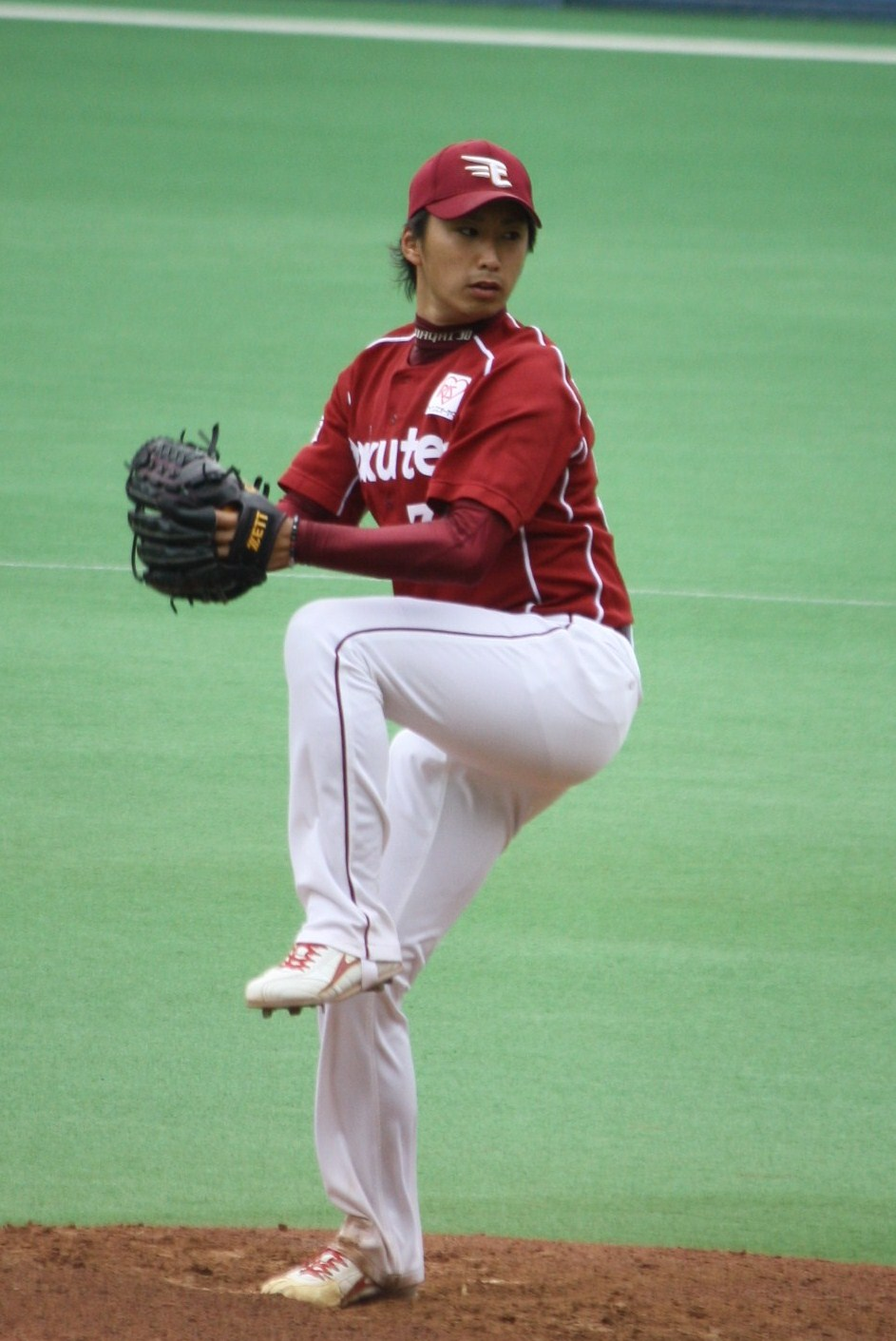
- Nagai with the Tohoku Rakuten Golden Eagles
- Pitcher / Coach
- Born: September 27, 1984 (age 41); Gunma, Japan
- Batted: Left Threw: Right

NPB debut
- April 1, 2007, for the Tohoku Rakuten Golden Eagles

Last NPB appearance
- October 6, 2015, for the Tohoku Rakuten Golden Eagles

NPB statistics
- Win–loss record: 43–43
- ERA: 3.65
- Strikeouts: 616
- Saves: 0
- Holds: 2

Teams
- As player: Tohoku Rakuten Golden Eagles (2007–2015); As coach: Tohoku Rakuten Golden Eagles (2020–2025)

Satoshi Nagai (永井 怜, Nagai Satoshi; born September 27, 1984 in Gunma, Japan) is a former Japanese professional baseball pitcher and currently development coach for the Tohoku Rakuten Golden Eagles of the Nippon Professional Baseball (NPB).

On October 14, 2019, Nagai become development coach for the Tohoku Rakuten Golden Eagles of NPB.
