= Yasuhiro Ichiba =

Japanese baseball player

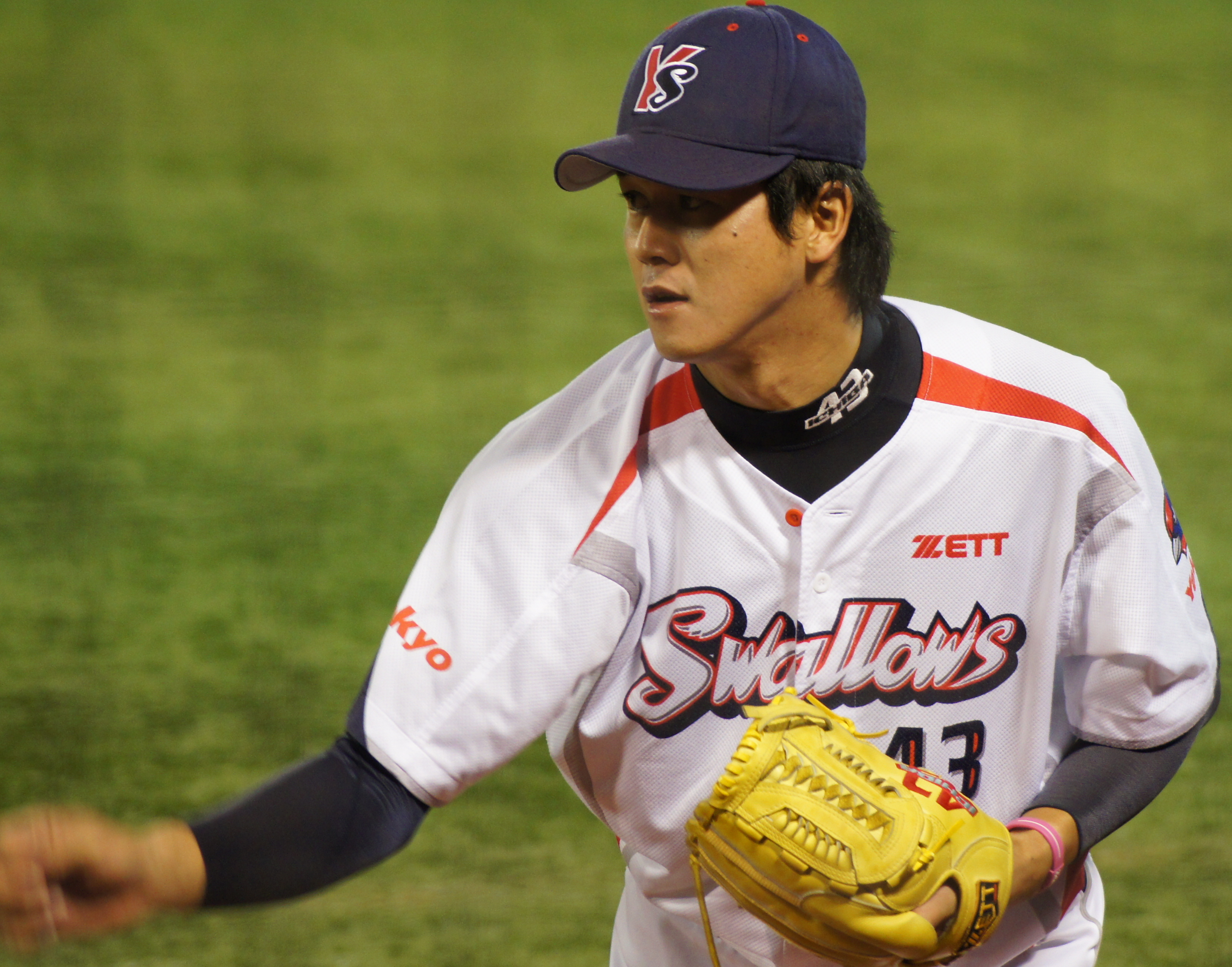
- Pitcher
- Born: July 5, 1982; Agatsuma District, Gunma, Japan
- Batted: Right Threw: Right

NPB debut
- April 12, 2005, for the Tohoku Rakuten Golden Eagles

Last appearance
- October 8, 2011, for the Tokyo Yakult Swallows

NPB statistics (through 2012)
- Win–loss record: 16–33
- Earned run average: 5.50
- Strikeouts: 322
- Saves: 1

Teams
- As player: Tohoku Rakuten Golden Eagles (2005–2008); Tokyo Yakult Swallows (2009–2012)

Yasuhiro Ichiba (一場 靖弘, Ichiba Yasuhiro; born July 5, 1982 in Agatsuma, Gunma, Japan) is a Japanese former Nippon Professional Baseball pitcher.
