= Masato Nakamura (baseball) =

Japanese baseball player (born 1982)

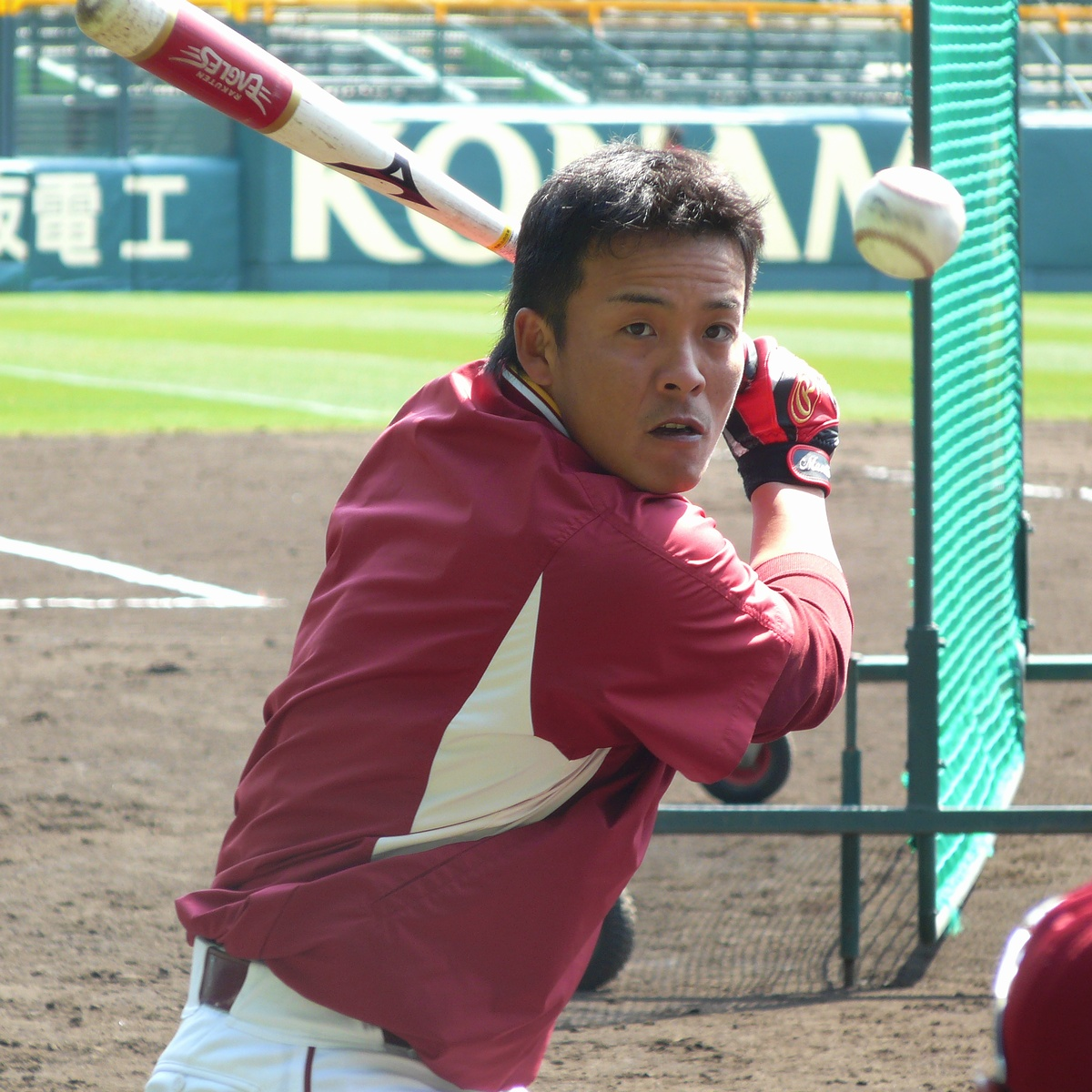
- Outfielder
- Born: February 2, 1982 (age 44)
- Bats: Left Throws: Right

NPB debut
- 2008, for the Tohoku Rakuten Golden Eagles

NPB statistics (through 2012)
- Batting average: .269
- Home runs: 6
- RBI: 69
- Stats at Baseball Reference

Teams
- Tohoku Rakuten Golden Eagles (2008–2012)

Masato Nakamura (中村 真人, born February 2, 1982, in Gose, Nara) is a Japanese professional baseball outfielder for the Tohoku Rakuten Golden Eagles in Japan's Nippon Professional Baseball.
