= Hisashi Aikyoh =

Japanese baseball player

- Pitcher
- Born: December 4, 1976 (age 49); Takatsuki, Osaka, Japan
- Bats: Right Throws: Right

debut
- March 27, 2001, for the Osaka Kintetsu Buffaloes

Career statistics (through 2008)
- Win–loss: 4–5
- ERA: 3.96
- Strikeouts: 88

Teams
- Osaka Kintetsu Buffaloes (2001 – 2004); Tohoku Rakuten Golden Eagles (2005 – 2009)

Hisashi Aikyoh (愛敬 尚史, Aikyō Hisashi; born December 4, 1976) is a former Nippon Professional Baseball player. He played for the Tohoku Rakuten Golden Eagles, and was also previously with the Osaka Kintetsu Buffaloes.
