= Toshiya Nakashima =

Japanese baseball player (born 1980)

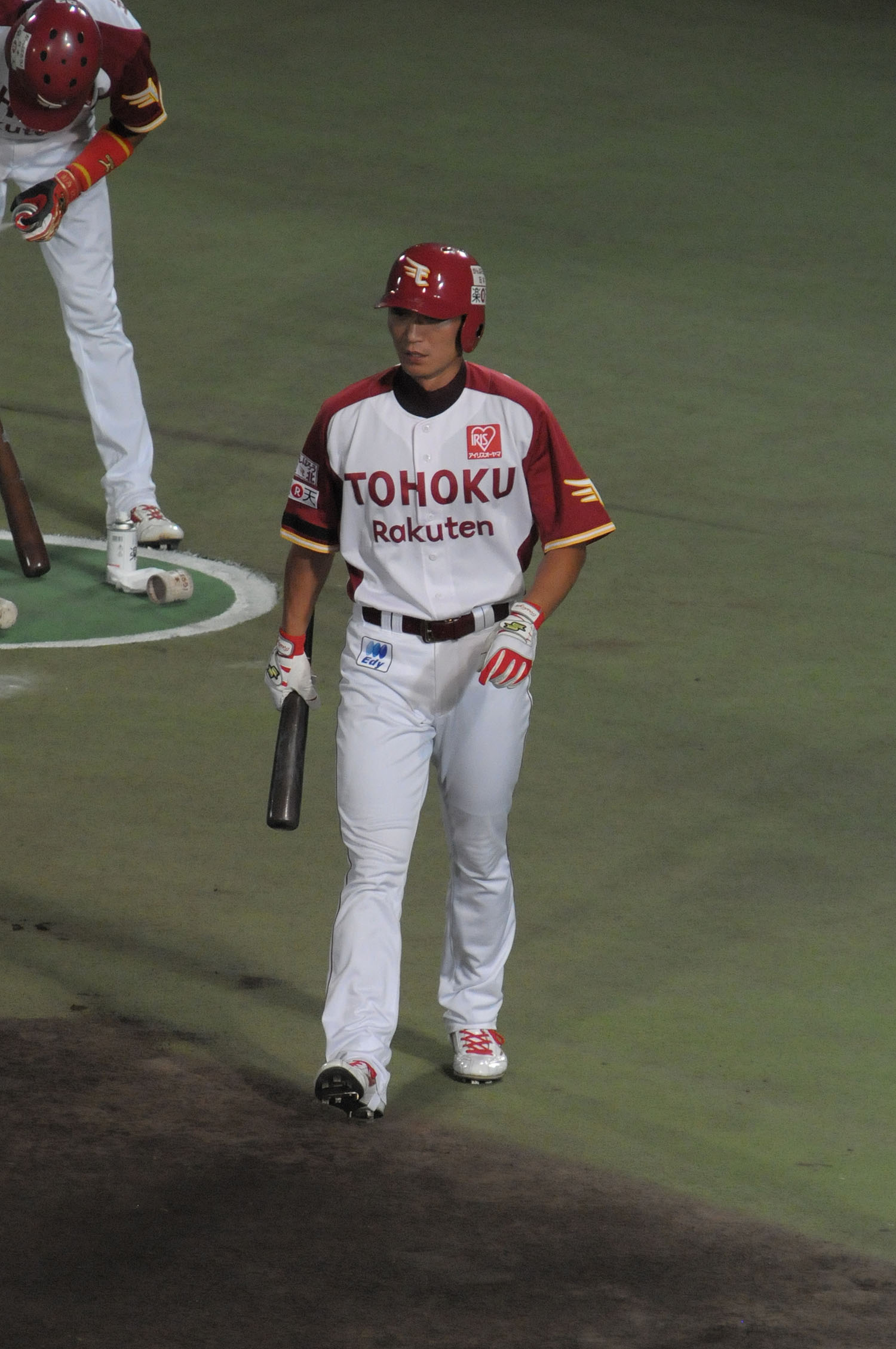
- Outfielder
- Born: June 10, 1980 (age 45)
- Bats: Right Throws: Right

NPB debut
- March 29, 2004, for the Orix BlueWave

NPB statistics (through 2013 season)
- Batting average: .266
- Home runs: 9
- RBI: 50

Teams
- Orix BlueWave (2003–2004); Tohoku Rakuten Golden Eagles (2005–2014)

Career highlights and awards
- Japan Series champion (2013)

Toshiya Nakashima (中島 俊哉, born June 10, 1980, in Chikugo, Fukuoka) is a Japanese professional baseball outfielder for the Tohoku Rakuten Golden Eagles in Japan's Nippon Professional Baseball.
