= Tadashi Ishimine =

Japanese baseball player (born 1985)

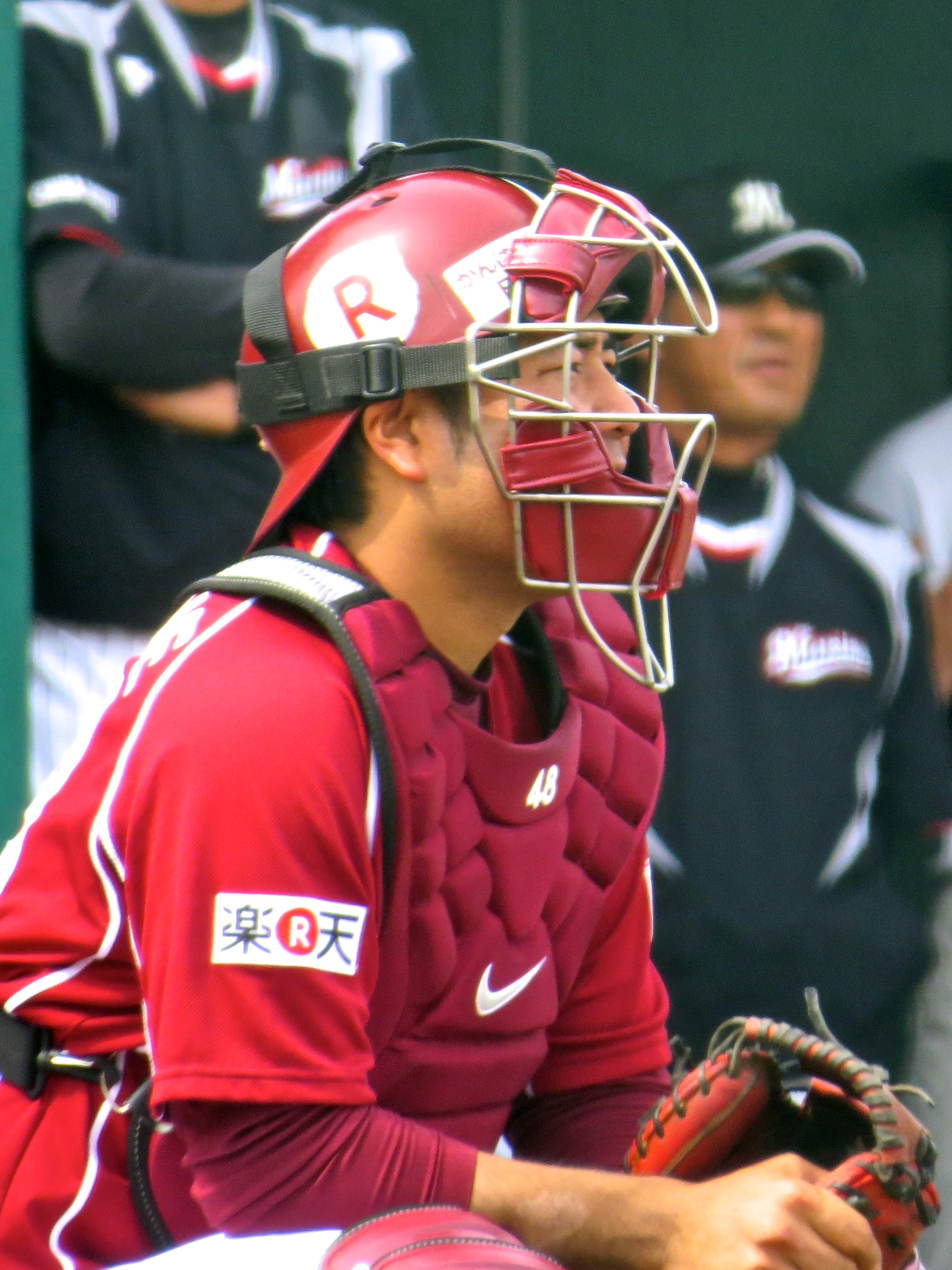
- Ishimine with the Tohoku Rakuten Golden Eagles
- Catcher
- Born: June 22, 1985 (age 41)
- Bats: Left Throws: Right

NPB debut
- July 29, 2008, for the Tohoku Rakuten Golden Eagles

NPB statistics (through 2016 season)
- Batting average: .203
- Home runs: 4
- RBI: 29
- Stats at Baseball Reference

Teams
- Tohoku Rakuten Golden Eagles (2008–2018)

Career highlights and awards
- 1x Japan Series champion (2013)

Tadashi Ishimine (伊志嶺 忠, born June 22, 1985, in Nakagami District, Okinawa) is a Japanese professional baseball catcher for the Tohoku Rakuten Golden Eagles in Japan's Nippon Professional Baseball.
