= Hideki Asai =

Japanese baseball player

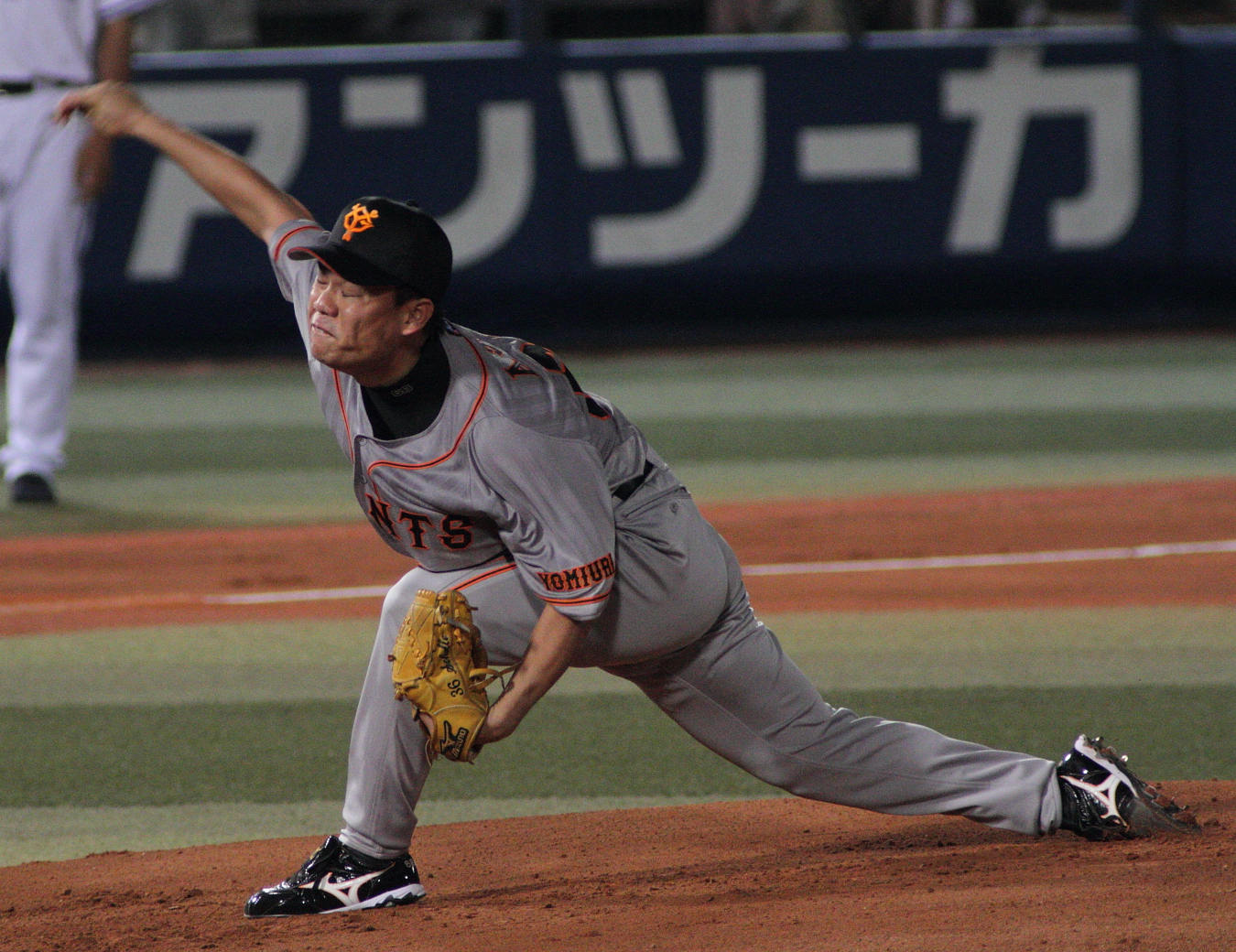
- Pitcher
- Born: January 1, 1984 (age 42); Higashisumiyoshi-ku, Osaka, Japan
- Batted: Right Threw: Right

NPB debut
- September 24, 2003, for the Osaka Kintetsu Buffaloes

Last NPB appearance
- October 5, 2010, for the Yomiuri Giants

NPB statistics
- Win–loss record: 25-33
- Earned run average: 4.09
- Strikeouts: 378
- Saves: 0
- Holds: 4

Teams
- Osaka Kintetsu Buffaloes (2002–2004); Tohoku Rakuten Golden Eagles (2005–2010); Yomiuri Giants (2010–2012)

Hideki Asai (朝井 秀樹, Asai Hideki; born January 1, 1984) is a Nippon Professional Baseball pitcher for the Yomiuri Giants in Japan's Central League. In 1993 he and two other Japanese pitchers worked out in spring training with the Los Angeles Dodgers. He also played Hawaii Winter Baseball with the Honolulu Sharks in 2006.
