= Yōsuke Takasu =

Japanese baseball player (born 1976)

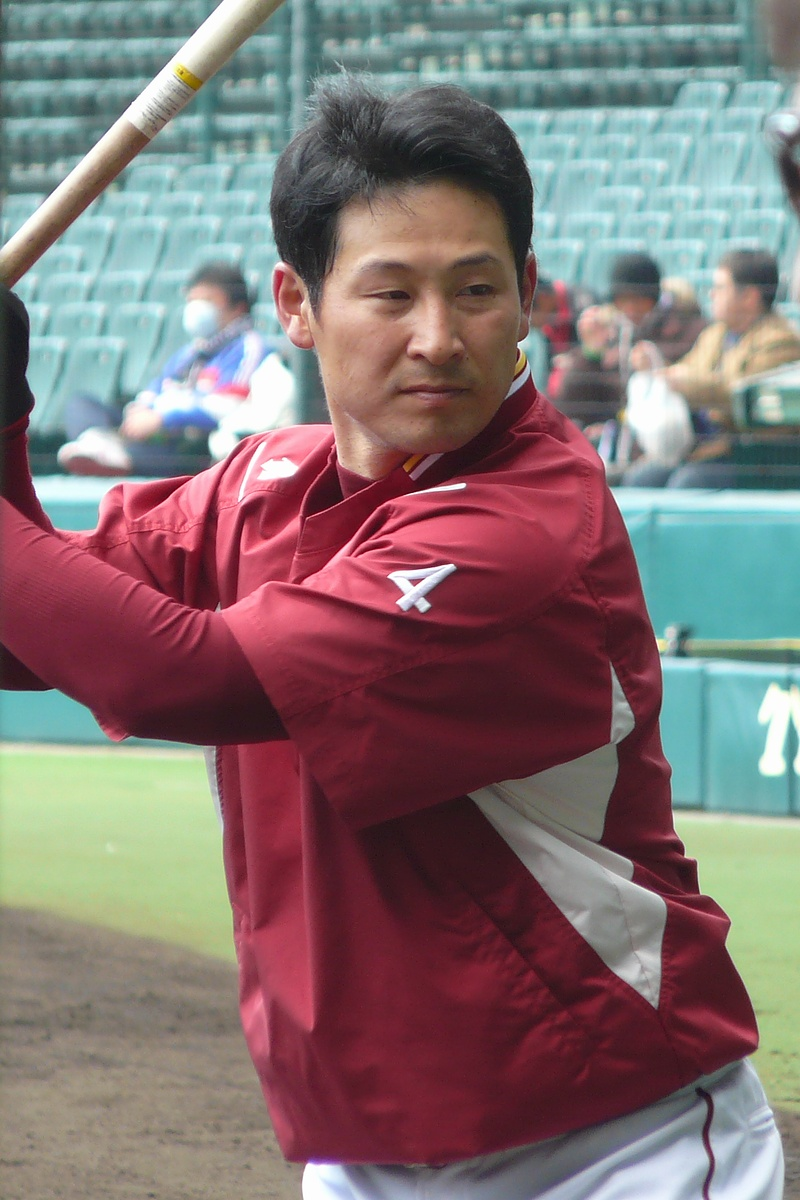
- Infielder / Coach
- Born: February 9, 1976 (age 49); Imari, Saga, Japan
- Batted: Right Threw: Right

NPB debut
- October 3, 1998, for the Kintetsu Buffaloes

Last NPB appearance
- June 1, 2013, for the Tohoku Rakuten Golden Eagles

NPB statistics
- Batting average: .268
- Home runs: 19
- Runs batted in: 331
- Stats at Baseball Reference

Teams
- As player: Kintetsu/Osaka Kintetsu Buffaloes (1998–2004); Tohoku Rakuten Golden Eagles (2005–2013); As coach: Yokohama DeNA BayStars (2015–2017); Tohoku Rakuten Golden Eagles (2018–2019); Wei Chuan Dragons (2020–2025）
Medals
Men's baseball
Representing Japan
Intercontinental Cup
Gold medal – first place	1997 Barcelona	Team

Yōsuke Takasu (高須 洋介, Takasu Yōsuke; born February 9, 1976) is a Japanese former professional baseball infielder and current coach for the Wei Chuan Dragons of the Chinese Professional Baseball League (CPBL). He played in Nippon Professional Baseball (NPB) for the Kintetsu/Osaka Kintetsu Buffaloes and Tohoku Rakuten Golden Eagles.
