= Koichi Isobe =

Japanese baseball player and coach (born 1974)

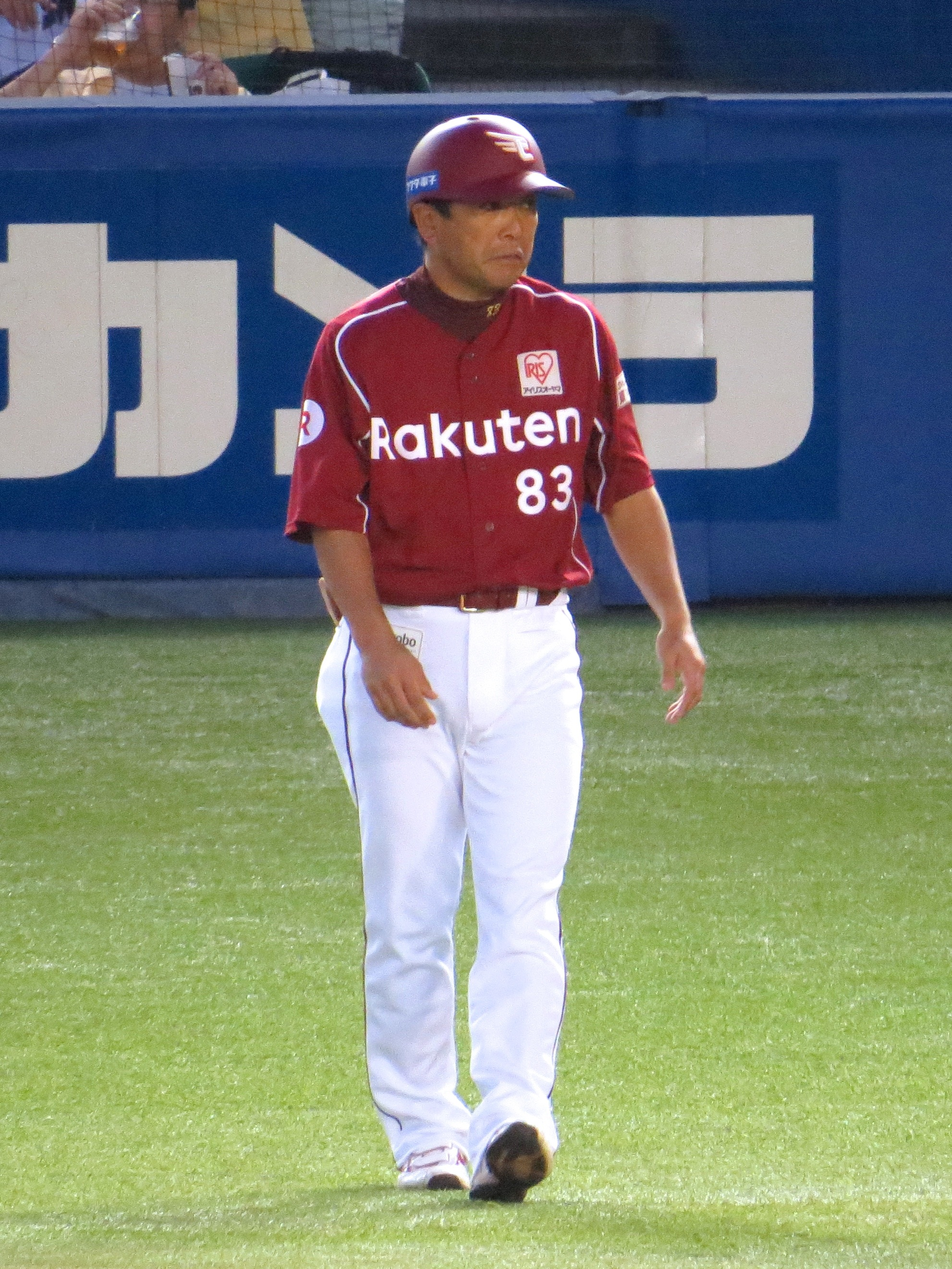
- Outfielder / Coach
- Born: March 12, 1974 (age 51); Higashihiroshima, Hiroshima
- Batted: Left Threw: Right

NPB debut
- April 9, 1997, for the Kintetsu Buffaloes

Last NPB appearance
- April 18, 2005, for the Tohoku Rakuten Golden Eagles

NPB statistics (through 2009)
- Batting average: .281
- Home runs: 97
- Hits: 1225

Teams
- As player: Kintetsu Buffaloes/Osaka Kintetsu Buffaloes (1997–2004); Tohoku Rakuten Golden Eagles (2005–2006); As coach: Tohoku Rakuten Golden Eagles (2010–2017)

Career highlights and awards
- 3× NPB All-Star (2004, 2005, 2007); 1× Best Nine Award (2001)
- Last updated on: 3 August 2019

Koichi Isobe (礒部 公一, Isobe Kōichi; born March 12, 1974) is a former Nippon Professional Baseball outfielder.
