= Katsunori Nomura =

Japanese baseball player and coach

Katsunori Nomura 野村 克則 カツノリ
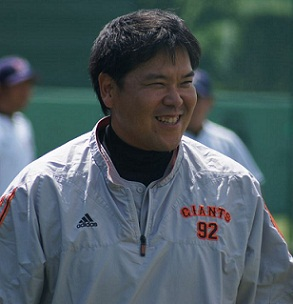

Hanshin Tigers – No. 87
- Catcher / Coach
- Born: July 23, 1973 (age 53); Toyonaka, Osaka, Japan
- Batted: Right Threw: Right

NPB debut
- April 16, 1997, for the Yakult Swallows

Last NPB appearance
- October 1, 2006, for the Tohoku Rakuten Golden Eagles

NPB statistics
- Batting average: .185
- On-base percentage: .237
- Slugging percentage: .261
- Stats at Baseball Reference

Teams
- As player: Yakult Swallows (1996–1999); Hanshin Tigers (2000–2003); Yomiuri Giants (2004); Tohoku Rakuten Golden Eagles (2005–2006); As coach: Tohoku Rakuten Golden Eagles (2007–2009, 2019–2021); Yomiuri Giants (2010–2013); Tokyo Yakult Swallows (2014–2018); Hanshin Tigers (2022–present)
- Last updated on: July 25, 20224

Katsunori Nomura (野村 克則, Nomura Katsunori; born July 23, 1973) also called as Katsunori (カツノリ) is currently a Nippon Professional Baseball (NPB) coach for the Hanshin Tigers. Before coaching, he played in NPB from 1996 to 2006, primarily as a second or third-string catcher. Nomura was drafted in 1995 by the Yakult Swallows, the team managed by his father, catching-great and long-time manager Katsuya Nomura. Over the course of his playing career, his father managed him for five seasons with three different teams—two with the Swallows, two with the Hanshin Tigers and one with the Golden Eagles.

== Career ==
Katsunori Nomura attended Horikoshi High School and Meiji University before being drafted by the Yakult Swallows in the third round of the 1995 Nippon Professional Baseball draft. He played two seasons with the Swallows under his father, manager and former catching-great Katsuya Nomura. After the 1998 season, his father left the Swallows and Nomura was sent to the club's farm team for the entirety of the 1999 season. He was then traded to the Hanshin Tigers, where he was reunited with his father who, again, managed him for two more seasons. After his father left the club after the 2001 season, Nomura was eventually sent down to the Tigers' farm team for the entirety of the 2003 season, his last with the club.

Nomura's contract was purchased by the Yomiuri Giants before the start of the 2004 season. While it was a relatively minor trade, it made headlines because of his father's longtime resentment toward the Giants. Some also saw the trade as an opportunity for him "to step out of his famous father's shadow." However, Nomura only played in three games with the Giants and was released following the end of the 2004 season. He played his final two seasons with the Tohoku Rakuten Golden Eagles in 2005 and 2006, the latter of which was managed once again by his father. He announced his retirement on September 30, 2006. Throughout his playing career, Nomura was utilized as a second or third-string catcher. After playing, Nomura transitioned to coaching in the league. He has coached for three different teams since 2007 and is currently with Rakuten.

Some have suggested that the only reason Katsunori Nomura was given the opportunity to play in NPB was because of his father's connections in the league. The Japan Times columnist Marty Kuehnert believes that he "hitched a ride" on his father's name, but his "statistics don't add up to a good month, or even week, of [Katsuya Nomura's] production". Of the four NPB teams Nomura played for in his playing career, three of them were managed by his father: the Swallows, the Tigers and the Golden Eagles.

== Personal life ==
Katsunori Nomura is the son of NPB catching great and long-time manager Katsuya Nomura. His half brother is prominent baseball agent Don Nomura. After a 2001 tax evasion scandal involving Katsunori's mother Sachiyo, Nomura was supportive during the months preceding her arrest. Kenneth Engel and Don Nomura, Sachiyo's children from a previous marriage, publicly disowned her. He has two children with his wife Yukiko.
