= Tetsuya Iida =

Japanese baseball player and coach

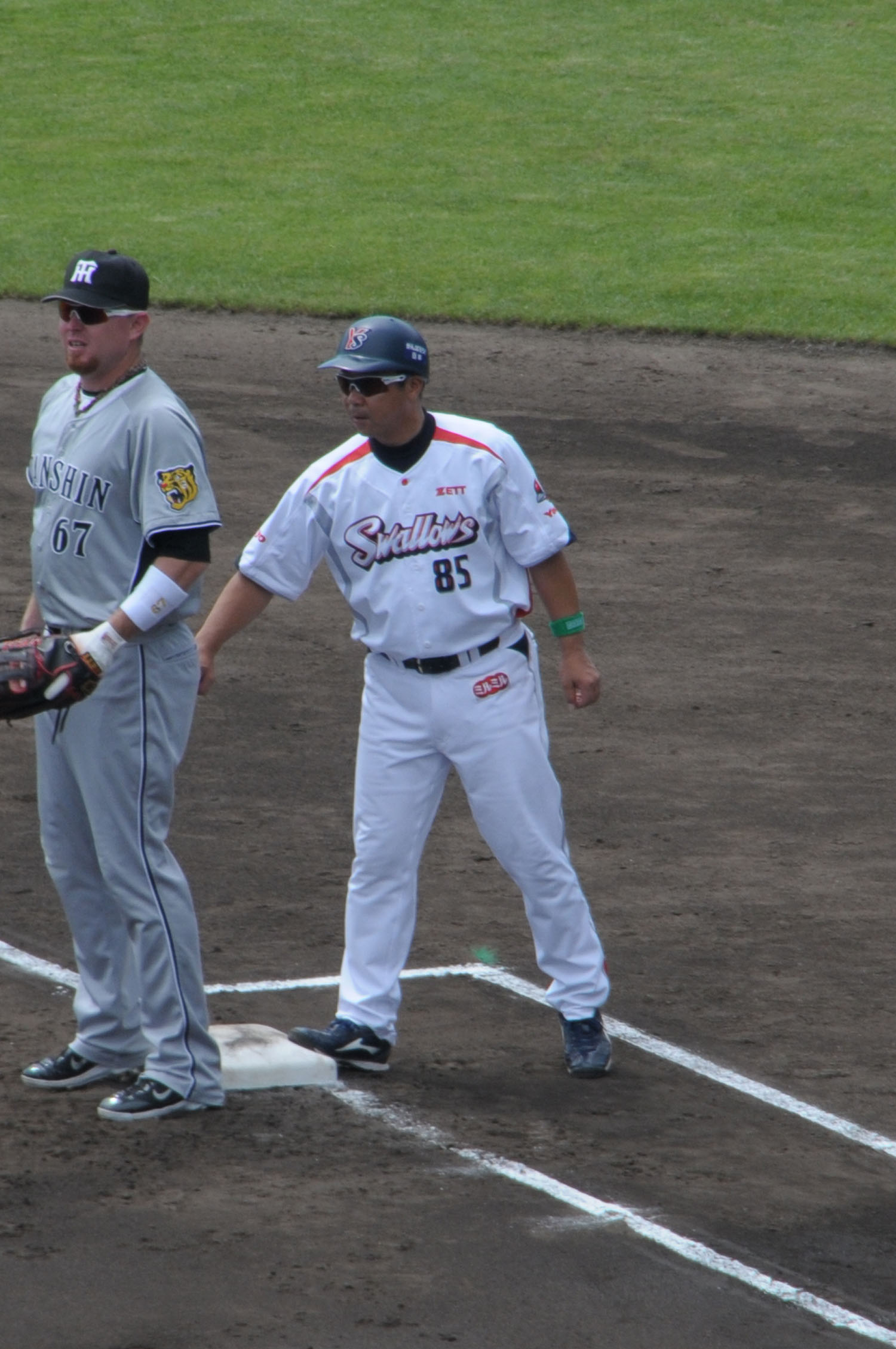
- Iida with the Tokyo Yakult Swallows
- Outfielder / Coach
- Born: May 18, 1968 (age 57); Chōfu, Tokyo, Japan
- Batted: Right Threw: Right

NPB debut
- April 12, 1989, for the Yakult Swallows

Last NPB appearance
- October 1, 2006, for the Tohoku Rakuten Golden Eagles

NPB statistics (through 2006)
- Batting average: .273
- Home runs: 48
- Hits: 1248
- Stats at Baseball Reference

Teams
- As player: Yakult Swallows (1987–2004); Tohoku Rakuten Golden Eagles (2005–2006); As coach: Tokyo Yakult Swallows (2007–2013); Fukuoka SoftBank Hawks (2015–2019)

Career highlights and awards
- 1x Central League stolen base champion (1992); 1x Central League Best Nine Award (1992); 7x Central League Golden Glove Award (1991–1997); 4x Japan Series champion (1993, 1995, 1997, 2001); 2x NPB All-Star (1992–1993)
- Last updated on: January 19, 2014

Tetsuya Iida (飯田 哲也, born May 18, 1968, in Chōfu, Tokyo, Japan) is a former Nippon Professional Baseball outfielder. He is best known for his career with the Yakult Swallows. He first joined Yakult in 1986 as the fourth player in the draft. Led by manager Katsuya Nomura, this period became known as the "golden age of Yakult" and Iida gained a reputation as the "poster child for ID baseball". Iida went on to play for the Rakuten Golden Eagles for two years before retiring.

Iida won the Pro Sportsman No.1 twice: first in 1995, as the first tournament winner to be inducted into the Hall of Fame, and then in 1999.
