= 2008 Nippon Professional Baseball season =

2008 NPB season
- League: Nippon Professional Baseball
- Sport: Baseball
- Duration: March 20 – November 9

Central League pennant
- League champions: Yomiuri Giants
- Runners-up: Hanshin Tigers
- Season MVP: Alex Ramírez (Yomiuri)

Pacific League pennant
- League champions: Saitama Seibu Lions
- Runners-up: Orix Buffaloes
- Season MVP: Hisashi Iwakuma (Rakuten)

Climax Series
- CL champions: Yomiuri Giants
- CL runners-up: Chunichi Dragons
- PL champions: Saitama Seibu Lions
- PL runners-up: Hokkaido Nippon-Ham Fighters

Japan Series
- Venue: Seibu Dome, Tokorozawa, Saitama; Tokyo Dome, Bunkyō, Tokyo
- Champions: Saitama Seibu Lions
- Runners-up: Yomiuri Giants
- Finals MVP: Takayuki Kishi (Seibu)

NPB seasons
- ← 2007 2009 →

The 2008 Nippon Professional Baseball season was the 59th season since the NPB was reorganized in 1950. The regular season started on March 20 with the Pacific League opener, and on March 28 with the Central League opener. On March 25 and 26, the Boston Red Sox and Oakland Athletics played 2 regular season Major League Baseball games at Tokyo Dome. During their visit, they also played exhibition games against the Hanshin Tigers and Yomiuri Giants.

== Format ==
=== Both League ===
- Season format
  - Regular season
  - Climax Series 1st stage: Regular season 2nd place vs. regular season 3rd place – Best of 3
  - Climax Series 2nd stage: Regular season 1st place vs. Climax Series 1st stage winner – Best of 7 (regular-season 1st place take a one-win advantage)
- Regular season 1st place is the champion

=== Japan Series ===
- Central League Climax Series 2nd stage winner vs. Pacific League Climax Series 2nd stage winner – Best of 7

== Changes ==
The Seibu Lions added the prefecture name "Saitama" in front of the team name starting with this season.

As to reduce the interference to teams whose main players would play in the Olympic Games, this year's trade and new foreign players deadlines were pushed to the end of July, instead of the end of June. Also, teams having more than three players selected by National teams were given an extra quota of foreign player limit during the Olympic Games.

The postseason playoff ("Climax Series") regulations have changed to give more advantages to League Champions, now the second stage series will play for 6 games, while the League Champion will have a one-win advantage.

In late June, the Free Agency regulation was amended after negotiation between the players committee and owners. Players are now eligible for free agency after 8 years of service to a team (1 playing year = 145 days on the active roster), players drafted before 2007 are shortened to 7 (University/Company/Independent League) to 8 (High School) years. However, oversea FA right which allow them to play in the Major League Baseball still needs 9 playing years. This amendment is also effective on non-Japanese players. Alex Ramírez, who served 8 playing years in Japan, became a "local player" after the season.

== Standings ==
=== Central League ===
==== Regular season ====
Central League regular season standings
Team	Pld	W	L	T	PCT	GB
Yomiuri Giants	144	84	57	3	.594	—
Hanshin Tigers	144	82	59	3	.580	2
Chunichi Dragons	144	71	68	5	.510	12
Hiroshima Toyo Carp	144	69	70	5	.497	14
Tokyo Yakult Swallows	144	66	74	4	.472	17.5
Yokohama BayStars	144	48	94	2	.340	36.5

Updated to match(es) played on unknown. Source:

==== Climax Series 1st stage ====
Hanshin Tigers (1) vs. Chunichi Dragons (2)

Game	Score	Date	Location	Attendance
1	Chunichi Dragons – 2, Hanshin Tigers – 0	October 18	Kyocera Dome Osaka	33,824
2	Chunichi Dragons – 3, Hanshin Tigers – 7	October 19	Kyocera Dome Osaka	33,881
3	Chunichi Dragons – 2, Hanshin Tigers – 0	October 20	Kyocera Dome Osaka	33,021

==== Climax Series 2nd stage ====
Yomiuri Giants (3) vs. Chunichi Dragons (1) The Giants have a one-game advantage.

Game	Score	Date	Location	Attendance
1	Chunichi Dragons – 4, Yomiuri Giants – 3	October 22	Tokyo Dome	44,072
2	Chunichi Dragons – 2, Yomiuri Giants – 11	October 23	Tokyo Dome	43,536
3	Chunichi Dragons – 5, Yomiuri Giants – 5 (12 innings)	October 24	Tokyo Dome	45,846
4	Chunichi Dragons – 2, Yomiuri Giants – 6	October 25	Tokyo Dome	46,797

=== Pacific League ===
==== Regular season ====
Pacific League regular season standings
Pos	Team	Pld	W	L	T	GB	PCT	Home	Away
1	Saitama Seibu Lions	144	76	64	4	—	.542	44–27–1	32–37–3
2	Orix Buffaloes	144	75	68	1	5.5	.524	41–31–0	34–37–1
3	Hokkaido Nippon-Ham Fighters	144	73	69	2	6	.514	41–30–1	32–39–1
4	Chiba Lotte Marines	144	73	70	1	7.5	.510	41–30–1	32–40–0
5	Tohoku Rakuten Golden Eagles	144	65	76	3	12.5	.462	37–34–1	28–42–2
6	Fukuoka SoftBank Hawks	144	64	77	3	13.5	.455	36–33–3	28–44–0

==== Climax Series 1st stage ====
Orix Buffaloes (0) vs. Hokkaido Nippon-Ham Fighters (2)

Game	Score	Date	Location	Attendance
1	Hokkaido Nippon-Ham Fighters – 4, Orix Buffaloes – 1	October 11	Kyocera Dome Osaka	25,532
2	Hokkaido Nippon-Ham Fighters – 7, Orix Buffaloes – 2	October 12	Kyocera Dome Osaka	26,703

==== Climax Series 2nd stage ====
Saitama Seibu Lions (4) vs. Hokkaido Nippon-Ham Fighters (2) The Lions have a one-game advantage.

Game	Score	Date	Location	Attendance
1	Hokkaido Nippon-Ham Fighters – 3, Saitama Seibu Lions – 10	October 17	Omiya Park Baseball Stadium	20,500
2	Hokkaido Nippon-Ham Fighters – 5, Saitama Seibu Lions – 0	October 18	Seibu Dome	30,918
3	Hokkaido Nippon-Ham Fighters – 7, Saitama Seibu Lions – 4	October 19	Seibu Dome	33,078
4	Hokkaido Nippon-Ham Fighters – 4, Saitama Seibu Lions – 9	October 21	Seibu Dome	18,704
5	Hokkaido Nippon-Ham Fighters – 0, Saitama Seibu Lions – 9	October 22	Seibu Dome	21,731

=== Interleague Games ===
Team	Pld	HW	HL	AW	AL	GB	PCT
Fukuoka SoftBank Hawks	24	10	2	5	7	—	.625
Hanshin Tigers	24	10	2	5	7	—	.625
Hokkaido Nippon-Ham Fighters	24	8	4	6	6	1	.583
Yomiuri Giants	24	9	3	5	7	1	.583
Tohoku Rakuten Golden Eagles	24	6	6	7	5	2	.542
Hiroshima Toyo Carp	24	6	6	7	5	2	.542
Chunichi Dragons	24	8	4	4	8	3	.500
Orix Buffaloes	24	6	6	5	7	4	.458
Tokyo Yakult Swallows	24	4	8	7	5	4	.458
Chiba Lotte Marines	24	6	6	4	8	5	.417
Saitama Seibu Lions	24	7	5	3	9	5	.417
Yokohama BayStars	24	5	7	1	11	9	.250

Updated to match(es) played on compute. Source:
Rules for classification: Whenever multiple teams have same number of wins, the team having better standings in last year's interleague games will have advantage, thus Fukuoka SoftBank Hawks won the interleague title, despite Hanshin Tigers beating the Hawks 3 out of 4 games. A similar rule applies to other teams tied in wins.

== Climax Series ==
Note: All of the games that are played in the first two rounds of the Climax Series are held at the higher seed's home stadium. The team with the higher regular-season standing also advances if the round ends in a tie.

First stage
Central League
2	Hanshin Tigers	1
3	Chunichi Dragons	2
Pacific League
2	Orix Buffaloes	0
3	Hokkaido Nippon-Ham Fighters	2

Final stage
1	Yomiuri Giants	3
3	Chunichi Dragons	1
1	Saitama Seibu Lions	4
3	Hokkaido Nippon-Ham Fighters	2

Japan Series
CL1	Yomiuri Giants	3
PL1	Saitama Seibu Lions	4

== Japan Series ==
Saitama Seibu Lions (4) vs. Yomiuri Giants (3)

Game	Score	Date	Location	Attendance
1	Saitama Seibu Lions – 2, Yomiuri Giants – 1	November 1	Tokyo Dome	44,757
2	Saitama Seibu Lions – 2, Yomiuri Giants – 3	November 2	Tokyo Dome	44,814
3	Yomiuri Giants – 6, Saitama Seibu Lions – 4	November 4	Seibu Dome	24,495
4	Yomiuri Giants – 0, Saitama Seibu Lions – 5	November 5	Seibu Dome	27,930
5	Yomiuri Giants – 7, Saitama Seibu Lions – 3	November 6	Seibu Dome	28,763
6	Saitama Seibu Lions – 4, Yomiuri Giants – 1	November 8	Tokyo Dome	44,749
7	Saitama Seibu Lions – 3, Yomiuri Giants – 2	November 9	Tokyo Dome	44,737

== See also ==
- 2008 Korea Professional Baseball season
- 2008 Major League Baseball season
