= 2013 Tohoku Rakuten Golden Eagles season =

Professional sports season in Nippon Professional Baseball

2013 Tohoku Rakuten Golden Eagles
- Japan Series champions
- Pacific League champions
- League: Pacific League
- Ballpark: Nippon Paper Kleenex Stadium
- Record: 82–59–3 (.582), 7½ GA
- League place: 1st
- Parent company: Rakuten
- President: Yozo Tachibana
- Manager: Senichi Hoshino
- Captain: Kazuo Matsui
- Average attendance: 17,793

The 2013 Tohoku Rakuten Golden Eagles season was the 8th season of the franchise in Nippon Professional Baseball, also their 8th season under Rakuten, also their 8th season at then-named Nippon Paper Kleenex Stadium (now Rakuten Seimei Park Miyagi), and also their 8th season in Sendai. The Eagles were managed by Senichi Hoshino in his 3rd season managing the Eagles. The Eagles won their first and only Pacific League pennant and their first and only Japan Series championship as of 2022.

== Regular season ==
=== Standings ===
2013 Pacific League regular season standings
Pos	Team	G	W	L	T	Pct.	GB	Home	Road
**1**	**Tohoku Rakuten Golden Eagles**^{†}	**144**	**82**	**59**	**3**	**.582**	—	**42–28–2**	**40–31–1**
2	Saitama Seibu Lions*	144	74	66	4	.529	7½	42–29–1	32–37–3
3	Chiba Lotte Marines*	144	74	68	2	.521	8½	41–29–2	33–39–0
4	Fukuoka SoftBank Hawks	144	73	69	2	.514	9½	37–34–1	36–35–1
5	Orix Buffaloes	144	66	73	5	.475	15	32–38–2	34–35–3
6	Hokkaido Nippon-Ham Fighters	144	64	78	2	.451	18½	35–36–1	29–42–1

^{†} League champion and advanced directly to the final stage of the Climax Series
* Advanced to the first stage of the Climax Series

=== Record vs. opponents ===
2013 record vs. opponents
Team	Buffaloes	Eagles	Fighters	Hawks	Lions	Marines	CL
Buffaloes	—	7–16–1	11–12–1	14–10	10–13–1	11–12−1	13–10–1
**Eagles**	**16–7–1**	—	**16–8**	**12–12**	**19–13–2**	**14–10**	**15–9**
Fighters	12–11–1	8–16	—	12–12	9–15	10–14	13–10–1
Hawks	10–14	12–12	12–12	—	15–8–1	9–15	15–8–1
Lions	13–10–1	13–9–2	15–9	8–15–1	—	14–10	11–13
Marines	12–11−1	10–14	14–10	15–9	10–14	—	13–10−1

=== Interleague ===
2013 regular season interleague standings
Pos	Team	G	W	L	T	Pct.	GB	Home	Road
1	Fukuoka SoftBank Hawks^{†}	24	15	8	1	.652	—	8–4	7–4–1
**2**	**Tohoku Rakuten Golden Eagles**	**24**	**15**	**9**	**1**	**.625**	**½**	**8–4**	**7–5**
3	Yomiuri Giants	24	13	10	1	.565	2	7–4–1	6–6
4	Hokkaido Nippon-Ham Fighters	24	13	10	1	.565	2	8–3−1	5–7
5	Chiba Lotte Marines	24	13	10	1	.565	2	7–4−1	6–6
6	Orix Buffaloes	24	13	10	1	.565	2	7–5	6–5−1
7	Hanshin Tigers	24	12	11	1	.522	3	7–5	5–6–1
8	Hiroshima Toyo Carp	24	11	13	0	.458	4½	7–5	4–8
9	Saitama Seibu Lions	24	11	13	0	.458	4½	6–6	5–7
10	Chunichi Dragons	24	10	13	1	.435	5	7–4–1	3–9
11	Tokyo Yakult Swallows	24	7	16	1	.304	8	5–7	2–9–1
12	Yokohama DeNA Baystars	24	7	17	0	.292	8½	1–11	6–6

^{†} Interleague champion

=== Chihō ballparks ===
The Eagles hosted five home games outside of Nippon Paper Kleenex Stadium in 2013. Four were played at chihō, or "countryside", ballparks in Fukushima, Iwate, Yamagata, and Akita Prefectures in Japan's Tōhoku region and the fifth was played at the Tokyo Dome in Tokyo.

2013 Rakuten Eagles chihō ballparks
Ballpark	City/Town	Prefecture
Iwate Prefectural Baseball Stadium	Morioka	Iwate Prefecture
Komachi Stadium	Akita	Akita Prefecture
Koriyama Kaiseizan Baseball Stadium	Kōriyama	Fukushima Prefecture
Shogin & Nissin Stadium	Nakayama	Yamagata Prefecture
Tokyo Dome	Bunkyō	Tokyo

=== Opening Day starting roster ===
Friday, March 29, 2013, vs. Fukuoka SoftBank Hawks

2013 Rakuten Eagles Opening Day starting roster
Order	Player	Position
1	Ryo Hijirisawa	Center fielder
2	Kazuya Fujita	Second baseman
3	Shintaro Masuda	Left fielder
4	Andruw Jones	Designated hitter
5	Ginji Akaminai	First baseman
6	Casey McGehee	Third baseman
7	Kazuo Matsui	Shortstop
8	Motohiro Shima	Catcher
9	Akihisa Makida	Right fielder
—	Takahiro Norimoto	Starting pitcher

=== Game log ===
2013 game log: 82–59–3 (Home: 42–28–2; Away: 40–31–1)
March/April: 11–14–0 (Home: 5–6–0; Away: 6–8–0)

#	Date	Opponent	Score	Win	Loss	Save	Stadium	Attendance	Record	Streak
1	March 29	@ Hawks	1–7	Settsu (1–0)	**Norimoto** (0–1)	—	Yafuoku Dome	38,561	0–1–0	L1
2	March 30	@ Hawks	3–1	**Duckworth** (1–0)	Yamada (0–1)	**Aoyama** (1)	Yafuoku Dome	36,229	1–1–0	W1
3	March 31	@ Hawks	9–1	**Mima** (1–0)	Takeda (0–1)	—	Yafuoku Dome	35,879	2–1–0	W2
4	April 2	Buffaloes	8–2	**Tanaka** (1–0)	Kaida (0–1)	—	Kleenex Stadium	16,273	3–1–0	W3
—	April 3	Buffaloes	Postponed (rain) – Makeup date: September 13				Kleenex Stadium	—	—	—
5	April 4	Buffaloes	2–13	Maestri (1–0)	**Kamata** (0–1)	—	Kleenex Stadium	17,482	3–2–0	L1
6	April 5	Marines	17–5	**Norimoto** (1–1)	Otani (0–1)	—	Kleenex Stadium	14,177	4–2–0	W1
7	April 6	Marines	3–2	**Heuser** (1–0)	Watanabe (0–1)	**Aoyama** (2)	Kleenex Stadium	18,809	5–2–0	W2
—	April 7	Marines	Postponed (rain) – Makeup date: April 8				Kleenex Stadium	—	—	—
8	April 8	Marines	2–11	Nishino (1–0)	**Kikuchi** (0–1)	—	Kleenex Stadium	9,209	5–3–0	L1
9	April 9	@ Fighters	9–1	**Tanaka** (2–0)	Arakaki (0–1)	—	Tokyo Dome	20,072	6–3–0	W1
10	April 10	@ Fighters	0–6	Yoshikawa (1–1)	**Kamata** (0–2)	—	Tokyo Dome	17,618	6–4–0	L1
11	April 11	@ Fighters	1–4	Ishii (2–0)	**Mima** (1–1)	Masui (2)	Tokyo Dome	16,573	6–5–0	L2
12	April 12	Lions	3–2	**Takahori** (1–0)	Kishi (0–3)	**Aoyama** (3)	Kleenex Stadium	12,374	7–5–0	W1
13	April 13	Lions	0–6	Kikuchi (2–0)	**Duckworth** (1–1)	—	Kleenex Stadium	14,537	7–6–0	L1
14	April 14	Lions	2–4	Togame (2–1)	**Kikuchi** (0–2)	Oishi (3)	Kleenex Stadium	16,528	7–7–0	L2
15	April 16	Hawks	5–6 (10)	Iwasaki (1–0)	**Katayama** (0–1)	Falkenborg (1)	Kleenex Stadium	16,089	7–8–0	L3
16	April 17	Hawks	1–5	Hoashi (1–0)	**Uezono** (0–1)	—	Kleenex Stadium	16,061	7–9–0	L4
17	April 18	Hawks	9–2	**Mima** (2–1)	Higashihama (0–1)	—	Kleenex Stadium	14,184	8–9–0	W1
18	April 19	@ Marines	1–3	Naruse (2–0)	**Norimoto** (1–2)	Masuda (4)	QVC Marine Field	9,799	8–10–0	L1
19	April 20	@ Marines	3–6	Minami (1–0)	**Duckworth** (1–2)	Masuda (5)	QVC Marine Field	13,490	8–11–0	L2
20	April 21	@ Marines	5–9	Katsuki (1–0)	**Kikuchi** (0–3)	—	QVC Marine Field	9,080	8–12–0	L3
21	April 23	@ Buffaloes	9–3	**Tanaka** (3–0)	Nakayama (0–3)	—	Kyocera Dome	10,778	9–12–0	W1
—	April 24	@ Buffaloes	Postponed (rain) – Makeup date: September 30				Hotto Motto Field	—	—	—
22	April 25	@ Buffaloes	9–3	**Mima** (3–1)	Kaida (1–2)	—	Hotto Motto Field	10,964	10–12–0	W2
23	April 27	@ Lions	9–2	**Norimoto** (2–2)	Kishi (1–4)	—	Seibu Dome	26,556	11–12–0	W3
24	April 28	@ Lions	1–15	Kikuchi (3–1)	**Duckworth** (1–3)	—	Seibu Dome	28,930	11–13–0	L1
25	April 29	@ Lions	4–8	Takekuma (1–0)	**Kikuchi** (0–4)	—	Seibu Dome	28,092	11–14–0	L2

May: 16–7–0 (Home: 8–3–0; Away: 8–4–0)

#	Date	Opponent	Score	Win	Loss	Save	Stadium	Attendance	Record	Streak
26	May 1	Fighters	4–1	**Tanaka** (4–0)	Yoshikawa (3–2)	**Aoyama** (4)	Kleenex Stadium	12,077	12–14–0	W1
27	May 2	Fighters	1–9	Kisanuki (3–1)	**Uezono** (0–2)	—	Kleenex Stadium	12,099	12–15–0	L1
28	May 3	Fighters	1–13	Tanimoto (1–2)	**Mima** (3–2)	—	Kleenex Stadium	20,129	12–16–0	L2
29	May 4	Buffaloes	4–1	**Norimoto** (3–2)	Kaneko (2–3)	**Aoyama** (5)	Kleenex Stadium	18,456	13–16–0	W1
30	May 5	Buffaloes	3–2	**Duckworth** (2–3)	Nishi (2–2)	**Aoyama** (6)	Kleenex Stadium	18,221	14–16–0	W2
31	May 6	Buffaloes	10–3	**Saito** (1–0)	Kishida (0–2)	—	Kleenex Stadium	15,963	15–16–0	W3
32	May 8	@ Fighters	5–2	**Tanaka** (5–0)	Kisanuki (3–2)	**Aoyama** (7)	Sapporo Dome	24,129	16–16–0	W4
33	May 9	@ Fighters	6–2	**Mima** (4–2)	Yoshikawa (3–3)	—	Sapporo Dome	19,333	17–16–0	W5
34	May 10	@ Marines	5–3	**Katayama** (1–1)	Masuda (0–1)	**Aoyama** (8)	QVC Marine Field	11,282	18–16–0	W6
—	May 11	@ Marines	Postponed (rain) – Makeup date: September 27				QVC Marine Field	—	—	—
35	May 12	@ Marines	4–5	Masuda (1–1)	**Aoyama** (0–1)	—	QVC Marine Field	20,849	18–17–0	L1
36	May 14	@ BayStars	7–3	**Tanaka** (6–0)	Miura (2–3)	—	Yokohama Stadium	17,050	19–17–0	W1
37	May 15	@ BayStars	7–5	**Katayama** (2–1)	H. Kobayashi (0–1)	—	Yokohama Stadium	14,583	20–17–0	W2
38	May 17	@ Dragons	3–4	Mise (1–0)	**Aoyama** (0–2)	—	Nagoya Dome	25,090	20–18–0	L1
39	May 18	@ Dragons	2–7	Okada (2–1)	**Norimoto** (3–3)	—	Nagoya Dome	26,824	20–19–0	L2
40	May 19	Swallows	1–0	**Nagai** (1–0)	Yagi (1–3)	**Rasner** (1)	Kleenex Stadium	13,171	21–19–0	W1
41	May 20	Swallows	3–1	**Tomura** (1–0)	Muranaka (3–3)	**Aoyama** (9)	Kleenex Stadium	15,199	22–19–0	W2
42	May 22	Giants	2–1	**Tanaka** (7–0)	Sawamura (2–3)	—	Kleenex Stadium	21,354	23–19–0	W3
43	May 23	Giants	4–10	Kasahara (2–1)	**Mima** (4–3)	—	Kleenex Stadium	20,405	23–20–0	L1
44	May 25	@ Carp	2–1	**Norimoto** (4–3)	Mickolio (1–2)	**Rasner** (2)	Mazda Stadium	28,017	24–20–0	W1
45	May 26	@ Carp	4–6	K. Maeda (4–3)	**Nagai** (1–1)	Mickolio (9)	Mazda Stadium	30,380	24–21–0	L1
46	May 28	@ Tigers	7–4	**Katayama** (3–1)	Kubo (2–3)	**Rasner** (3)	Koshien Stadium	32,481	25–21–0	W1
47	May 29	@ Tigers	2–0	**Tomura** (2–0)	Enokida (2–5)	**Rasner** (4)	Koshien Stadium	34,858	26–21–0	W2
48	May 31	BayStars	10–3	**Norimoto** (5–3)	Ino (2–5)	—	Kleenex Stadium	15,355	27–21–0	W3

June: 11–9–0 (Home: 5–5–0; Away: 6–4–0)

#	Date	Opponent	Score	Win	Loss	Save	Stadium	Attendance	Record	Streak
49	June 1	BayStars	3–4	Fujii (4–1)	**Nagai** (1–2)	Yamaguchi (7)	Kleenex Stadium	20,413	27–22–0	L1
50	June 2	Dragons	1–0	**Kikuchi** (1–4)	Yamamoto (2–1)	**Rasner** (5)	Kleenex Stadium	17,065	28–22–0	W1
51	June 3	Dragons	2–1 (11)	**Rasner** (1–0)	Muto (1–2)	—	Kleenex Stadium	14,461	29–22–0	W2
52	June 5	@ Swallows	5–9	Emura (2–0)	**Aoyama** (0–3)	—	Meiji Jingu Stadium	14,215	29–23–0	L1
53	June 6	@ Swallows	9–4	**Norimoto** (6–3)	Ishikawa (2–5)	—	Meiji Jingu Stadium	14,034	30–23–0	W1
54	June 8	@ Giants	3–5	Sugano (6–2)	**Kikuchi** (1–5)	Kentaro (15)	Tokyo Dome	44,993	30–24–0	L1
55	June 9	@ Giants	5–3	**Tanaka** (8–0)	Utsumi (4–3)	—	Tokyo Dome	46,087	31–24–0	W1
56	June 12	Carp	3–4 (10)	Mickolio (2–2)	**Koyama** (0–1)	—	Kleenex Stadium	15,117	31–25–0	L1
57	June 13	Carp	4–5	Hisamoto (2–1)	**Rasner** (1–1)	Imamura (1)	Kleenex Stadium	17,677	31–26–0	L2
58	June 15	Tigers	2–1	**Nagai** (2–2)	Nomi (6–3)	**Rasner** (6)	Kleenex Stadium	21,252	32–26–0	W1
59	June 16	Tigers	3–0	**Tanaka** (9–0)	Fujinami (4–2)	—	Kleenex Stadium	21,430	33–26–0	W2
60	June 21	Hawks	2–13	Settsu (7–3)	**Norimoto** (6–4)	—	Kaiseizan Stadium	11,214	33–27–0	L1
61	June 22	Hawks	2–8	Oba (1–2)	**Tomura** (2–1)	—	Kleenex Stadium	19,717	33–28–0	L2
62	June 23	Hawks	5–2	**Duckworth** (3–3)	Hoashi (5–2)	**Rasner** (7)	Kleenex Stadium	19,411	34–28–0	W1
63	June 25	@ Lions	11–0	**Tanaka** (10–0)	Makita (4–5)	—	Seibu Dome	14,528	35–28–0	W2
64	June 26	@ Lions	0–1	Nogami (4–2)	**Nagai** (2–3)	Sarfate (3)	Seibu Dome	12,707	35–29–0	L1
65	June 27	@ Lions	10–1	**Kawai** (1–0)	Wakui (4–4)	—	Omiya Stadium	20,051	36–29–0	W1
66	June 28	@ Buffaloes	2–3	Higa (1–0)	**Norimoto** (6–5)	—	Kyocera Dome	14,726	36–30–0	L1
67	June 29	@ Buffaloes	2–0	**Tomura** (3–1)	Igawa (2–2)	**Rasner** (8)	Kyocera Dome	20,187	37–30–0	W1
68	June 30	@ Buffaloes	2–1 (10)	**Aoyama** (1–3)	Y. Hirano (1–3)	**Rasner** (9)	Kyocera Dome	23,596	38–30–0	W2

July: 14–6–1 (Home: 9–3–1; Away: 5–3–0)

#	Date	Opponent	Score	Win	Loss	Save	Stadium	Attendance	Record	Streak
69	July 2	Marines	7–0	**Tanaka** (11–0)	Karakawa (4–6)	—	Kleenex Stadium	14,347	39–30–0	W3
—	July 3	Marines	Postponed (rain) – Makeup date: October 3				Kleenex Stadium	—	—	—
70	July 4	Marines	8–4	**Kawai** (2–0)	Furuya (1–1)	—	Kleenex Stadium	11,819	40–30–0	W4
71	July 5	@ Hawks	1–6	Settsu (9–3)	**Norimoto** (6–6)	—	Yafuoku Dome	30,079	40–31–0	L1
72	July 6	@ Hawks	8–4	**Norimoto** (7–6)	Padilla (2–4)	—	Yafuoku Dome	35,709	41–31–0	W1
73	July 7	@ Hawks	7–0	**Duckworth** (4–3)	Hoashi (5–4)	—	Yafuoku Dome	36,493	42–31–0	W2
74	July 9	Fighters	5–0	**Tanaka** (12–0)	M. Takeda (5–5)	—	Tokyo Dome	43,683	43–31–0	W3
75	July 10	Fighters	1–4	Wolfe (4–3)	**Nagai** (2–4)	H. Takeda (15)	Kleenex Stadium	15,428	43–32–0	L1
76	July 11	Fighters	3–0	**Kawai** (3–0)	Tanimoto (3–4)	**Rasner** (10)	Kleenex Stadium	11,931	44–32–0	W1
77	July 12	Lions	3–4 (12)	Y. Okamoto (2–0)	**Hoshino** (0–1)	Matsushita (1)	Kleenex Stadium	12,758	44–33–0	L1
78	July 13	Lions	3–1	**Norimoto** (8–6)	Togame (6–6)	**Rasner** (11)	Kleenex Stadium	18,722	45–33–0	W1
79	July 14	Lions	2–5	Kishi (5–5)	**Duckworth** (4–4)	—	Kleenex Stadium	21,283	45–34–0	L1
80	July 15	@ Buffaloes	1–0	**Koyama** (1–1)	T. Sato (2–1)	**Rasner** (12)	Kyocera Dome	20,184	46–34–0	W1
81	July 16	@ Buffaloes	4–1	**Tanaka** (13–0)	Dickson (5–3)	—	Kyocera Dome	11,860	47–34–0	W2
82	July 17	@ Buffaloes	0–3	Kaneko (7–5)	**Kawai** (3–1)	—	Kyocera Dome	10,743	47–35–0	L1
All-Star Break: CL and PL split series, 1–1–1
83	July 24	@ Hawks	9–4	**Saito** (2–0)	Igarashi (1–2)	—	Kitakyushu Stadium	20,851	48–35–0	W1
84	July 25	@ Hawks	2–5	Hoashi (6–4)	**Koyama** (1–2)	Igarashi (2)	Yafuoku Dome	38,561	48–36–0	L1
85	July 26	Marines	3–2	**Tanaka** (14–0)	Masuda (2–4)	—	Kleenex Stadium	20,382	49–36–0	W1
86	July 27	Marines	8–1	**Tomura** (4–1)	Gonzalez (0–2)	—	Kleenex Stadium	21,334	50–36–0	W2
87	July 28	Marines	5–4	**Aoyama** (2–3)	Rosa (0–1)	**Rasner** (13)	Kleenex Stadium	19,773	51–36–0	W3
88	July 30	Lions	9–4	**Norimoto** (9–6)	Y. Okamoto (3–1)	—	Iwate Baseball Stadium	15,043	52–36–0	W4
89	July 31	Lions	2−2	Game tied after 5 innings			Komachi Stadium	12,759	52–36–1	T1

August: 14–11–0 (Home: 6–5–0; Away: 8–6–0)

#	Date	Opponent	Score	Win	Loss	Save	Stadium	Attendance	Record	Streak
90	August 2	@ Fighters	4–1	**Tanaka** (15–0)	Wolfe (4–5)	—	Sapporo Dome	28,659	53–36–1	W1
91	August 3	@ Fighters	3–0	**Duckworth** (5–4)	Kawano (0–1)	**Rasner** (14)	Sapporo Dome	36,535	54–36–1	W2
92	August 4	@ Fighters	14–4	**Miyagawa** (1–0)	Yoshikawa (6–9)	—	Sapporo Dome	27,592	55–36–1	W3
—	August 6	Buffaloes	Postponed (rain) – Makeup date: October 8				Kleenex Stadium	—	—	—
93	August 7	Buffaloes	1–2	Kaneko (9–6)	**Aoyama** (2–4)	Y. Hirano (22)	Kleenex Stadium	19,255	55–37–1	L1
94	August 8	Buffaloes	5–2	**Norimoto** (10–6)	Maestri (4–3)	**Rasner** (15)	Kleenex Stadium	16,094	56–37–1	W1
95	August 9	Hawks	5–0	**Tanaka** (16–0)	Hoashi (7–5)	—	Kleenex Stadium	21,320	57–37–1	W2
96	August 10	Hawks	3–8	Settsu (12–4)	**Karashima** (0–1)	—	Kleenex Stadium	21,42	57–38–1	L1
97	August 11	Hawks	10–6	**Saito** (3–0)	Iwasaki (1–4)	—	Kleenex Stadium	21,465	58–38–1	W1
98	August 13	@ Marines	0–3	Furuya (5–1)	**Tomura** (4–2)	Uchi (1)	QVC Marine Field	22,664	58–39–1	L1
99	August 14	@ Marines	5–6 (11)	Matsunaga (2–1)	**Koyama** (1–3)	—	QVC Marine Field	22,861	58–40–1	L2
100	August 15	@ Marines	3–1	**Norimoto** (11–6)	Watanabe (0–3)	**Rasner** (16)	QVC Marine Field	22,243	59–40–1	W1
101	August 16	@ Lions	3–1	**Tanaka** (17–0)	Nogami (8–3)	**Rasner** (17)	Seibu Dome	29,846	60–40–1	W2
102	August 17	@ Lions	2–3	Sarfate (5–0)	**Koyama** (1–4)	—	Seibu Dome	27,382	60–41–1	L1
103	August 18	@ Lions	11–12	Masuda (2–2)	**Rasner** (1–2)	—	Seibu Dome	21,689	60–42–1	L2
104	August 20	Fighters	5–9	Tanimoto (5–4)	**Uezono** (0–3)	—	Shogin & Nissin Stadium	13,407	60–43–1	L3
105	August 21	Fighters	3–5	M. Takeda (7–5)	**Mima** (4–4)	H. Takeda (20)	Kleenex Stadium	19,127	60–44–1	L4
106	August 22	Fighters	2–5	Wolfe (5–5)	**Norimoto** (11–7)	—	Kleenex Stadium	18,904	60–45–1	L5
107	August 23	Marines	5–0	**Tanaka** (18–0)	Nishino (9–4)	—	Kleenex Stadium	20,766	61–45–1	W1
108	August 24	Marines	7–5	**Karashima** (1–1)	Hattori (1–1)	**Saito** (1)	Kleenex Stadium	21,372	62–45–1	W2
109	August 25	Marines	6–5	**Hasebe** (1–0)	Masuda (2–5)	—	Kleenex Stadium	20,263	63–45–1	W3
110	August 27	@ Buffaloes	0–4	Matsuba (4–4)	**Heuser** (1–1)	—	Kyocera Dome	12,921	63–46–1	L1
111	August 28	@ Buffaloes	2–1	**Mima** (5–4)	Kaneko (10–8)	**Saito** (2)	Kyocera Dome	13,687	64–46–1	W1
112	August 29	@ Buffaloes	4–2	**Norimoto** (12–7)	Nishi (7–7)	**Aoyama** (10)	Hotto Motto Field	22,293	65–46–1	W2
113	August 30	@ Hawks	11–6	**Tanaka** (19–0)	Hoashi (7–7)	—	Yafuoku Dome	36,218	66–46–1	W3
114	August 31	@ Hawks	2–9	Settsu (14–5)	**Karashima** (1–2)	—	Yafuoku Dome	36,782	66–47–1	L1

September/October: 15–12–2 (Home: 8–6–1; Away: 7–6–1)

#	Date	Opponent	Score	Win	Loss	Save	Stadium	Attendance	Record	Streak
115	September 1	@ Hawks	0–4	Oseguera (1–0)	**Duckworth** (5–5)	—	Yafuoku Dome	36,464	66–48–1	L2
116	September 3	Lions	4–3	**Kaneto** (1–0)	Wakui (5–7)	**Saito** (3)	Kleenex Stadium	18,541	67–48–1	W1
117	September 4	Lions	0−0	Game tied after 12 innings			Kleenex Stadium	13,710	67–48–2	T1
—	September 5	Lions	Postponed (rain) – Makeup date: October 4				Kleenex Stadium	—	—	—
118	September 6	Fighters	3–2	**Tanaka** (20–0)	Yanuki (2–2)	—	Kleenex Stadium	22,316	68–48–2	W1
119	September 7	Fighters	7–5	**Karashima** (2–2)	Keppel (2–4)	**Saito** (4)	Kleenex Stadium	20,833	69–48–2	W2
120	September 8	Fighters	3–1	**Norimoto** (13–7)	Yoshikawa (7–12)	**Aoyama** (11)	Kleenex Stadium	20,429	70–48–2	W3
121	September 10	@ Marines	2–9	Karakawa (9–9)	**Ray** (0–1)	—	QVC Marine Field	13,922	70–49–2	L1
122	September 11	@ Marines	7–0	**Mima** (6–4)	Otani (2–4)	—	QVC Marine Field	12,624	71–49–2	W1
123	September 12	@ Marines	6–2	**Kamata** (1–2)	Greisinger (5–4)	**Hasebe** (1)	QVC Marine Field	12,898	72–49–2	W2
124	September 13	Buffaloes	6–2	**Tanaka** (21–0)	Yagi (0–2)	—	Kleenex Stadium	21,534	73–49–2	W3
125	September 14	Buffaloes	1–2	Dickson (7–7)	**Karashima** (2–3)	Y. Hirano (24)	Kleenex Stadium	21,205	73–50–2	L1
—	September 15	Buffaloes	Postponed (rain) – Makeup date: October 12				Kleenex Stadium	—	—	—
—	September 16	Buffaloes	Postponed (rain) – Makeup date: October 13				Kleenex Stadium	—	—	—
126	September 17	Hawks	7–5	**Norimoto** (14–7)	Terahara (4–6)	**Hasebe** (2)	Kleenex Stadium	16,863	74–50–2	W1
127	September 18	Hawks	10–11	Kanazawa (2–0)	**Hasebe** (1–1)	Falkenborg (10)	Kleenex Stadium	17,667	74–51–2	L1
128	September 19	Hawks	3–2	**Aoyama** (3–4)	Igarashi (2–3)	—	Kleenex Stadium	19,525	75–51–2	W1
129	September 21	@ Fighters	7–3	**Tanaka** (22–0)	Yoshikawa (7–14)	—	Sapporo Dome	37,992	76–51–2	W2
130	September 22	@ Fighters	15–1	**Karashima** (3–3)	Keppel (2–5)	—	Sapporo Dome	41,071	77–51–2	W3
131	September 23	@ Fighters	5–0	**Miyagawa** (2–0)	Kisanuki (9–7)	—	Sapporo Dome	27,535	78–51–2	W4
132	September 24	@ Lions	3–4	Sarfate (6–1)	**Aoyama** (3–5)	—	Seibu Dome	19,621	78–52–2	L1
133	September 25	@ Lions	2–4	Sarfate (7–1)	**D. Kato** (0–1)	—	Seibu Dome	20,332	78–53–2	L2
134	September 26	@ Lions	4–3	**Heuser** (2–1)	Nogami (8–7)	**Tanaka** (1)	Seibu Dome	27,869	79–53–2	W1
135	September 27	@ Marines	0–6	Matsunaga (4–1)	**Kawai** (3–2)	—	QVC Marine Field	18,421	79–54–2	L1
136	September 29	@ Hawks	0–5	Higashihama (2–1)	**Karashima** (3–4)	—	Yafuoku Dome	37,519	79–55–2	L2
137	September 30	@ Buffaloes	0−0	Game tied after 12 innings			Kyocera Dome	14,098	79–55–3	T1
138	October 1	@ Fighters	11–2	**Tanaka** (23–0)	Thomas (0–2)	—	Sapporo Dome	24,661	80–55–3	W1
139	October 3	Marines	6–7	Ledezma (3–2)	**D. Kato** (0–2)	Uchi (2)	Kleenex Stadium	22,254	80–56–3	L1
140	October 4	Lions	4–6	Nogami (11–7)	**Mima** (6–5)	Wakui (5)	Kleenex Stadium	16,577	80–57–3	L2
141	October 5	Lions	1–2	Kishi (11–5)	**Norimoto** (14–8)	Wakui (6)	Kleenex Stadium	22,581	80–58–3	L3
142	October 8	Buffaloes	7–3	**Tanaka** (24–0)	Maestri (7–5)	—	Kleenex Stadium	19,433	81–58–3	W1
143	October 12	Buffaloes	4–1	**Norimoto** (15–8)	Mills (0–1)	**Hasebe** (3)	Kleenex Stadium	12,082	82–58–3	W2
144	October 13	Buffaloes	4–10	Kaneko (15–8)	**Heuser** (2–2)	—	Kleenex Stadium	16,966	82–59–3	L1

Win | Loss | Tie | Postponement | = Interleague play
**Bold** = Eagles team member

== Postseason ==
=== Game log ===
2013 postseason game log: 10–5–0 (Home: 7–4–0; Away: 3–1–0)
Climax Series final stage: 4–1–0 (Home: 4–1–0)

#	Date	Opponent	Score	Win	Loss	Save	Stadium	Attendance	Record	Streak
1	The Pacific League regular season champion is given a one-game advantage in the final stage.								1–0–0	W1
2	October 17	Marines	2–1	**Tanaka** (1–0)	Naruse (0–1)	—	Kleenex Stadium	24,332	2–0–0	W2
3	October 18	Marines	1–4 (10)	Uchi (1–0)	**Kaneto** (0–1)	—	Kleenex Stadium	24,097	2–1–0	L1
5	October 19	Marines	2–0	**Mima** (1–0)	Furuya (0–1)	—	Kleenex Stadium	24,396	3–1–0	W1
—	October 20	Marines	Cancelled (rain)				Kleenex Stadium	—	—	—
5	October 21	Marines	8–5	**Saito** (1–0)	Rosa (0–1)	**Tanaka** (1)	Kleenex Stadium	24,264	4–1–0	W2

Japan Series: 4–3–0 (Home: 2–2–0; Away: 2–1–0)

#	Date	Opponent	Score	Win	Loss	Save	Stadium	Attendance	Record	Streak
1	October 26	Giants	0–2	Utsumi (1–0)	**Norimoto** (0–1)	Nishimura (1)	Kleenex Stadium	25,209	0–1–0	L1
2	October 27	Giants	2–1	**Tanaka** (1–0)	Sugano (0–1)	—	Kleenex Stadium	25,219	1–1–0	W1
3	October 29	@ Giants	5–1	**Mima** (1–0)	Sugiuchi (0–1)	—	Tokyo Dome	44,940	2–1–0	W2
4	October 30	@ Giants	5–6	Mathieson (1–0)	**Hasebe** (0–1)	Yamaguchi (1)	Tokyo Dome	44,968	2–2–0	L1
5	October 31	@ Giants	4–2 (10)	**Norimoto** (1–1)	Nishimura (0–1)	—	Tokyo Dome	44,995	3–2–0	W1
6	November 2	Giants	2–4	Sugano (1–1)	**Tanaka** (1–1)	Mathieson (1)	Kleenex Stadium	25,271	3–3–0	L1
7	November 3	Giants	3–0	**Mima** (2–0)	Sugiuchi (0–2)	**Tanaka** (1)	Kleenex Stadium	25,249	4–3–0	W1

Asia Series: 2–1–0 (Home: 1–1–0; Away: 1–0–0)

#	Date	Opponent	Score	Win	Loss	Save	Stadium	Attendance	Record	Streak
1	November 15	Rhinos	6–1	**Kaneto** (1–0)	CF. Yang (0–1)	—	Taichung Stadium	10,910	1–0–0	W1
2	November 17	@ Cavalry	6–3	**Nagai** (1–0)	Motta (0–1)	Koyama (1)	Taoyuan Stadium	4,211	2–0–0	W2
3	November 19	Lions	1–4	Figueroa (1–0)	**Miyagawa** (0–1)	—	Taichung Stadium	4,720	2–1–0	L1

Win | Loss | Tie | Postponement
**Bold** = Eagles team member

== Roster ==
2013 Tohoku Rakuten Golden Eagles
Roster
Pitchers: 00 Tomoki Hoshino; 14 Takahiro Norimoto; 17 Darrell Rasner; 18 Masahiro Tanaka; 20 Kohei Hasebe; 21 Yoshinao Kamata; 22 Kenji Tomura; 24 Kazuya Takahori; 26 Norihito Kaneto; 28 Hiroshi Katayama; 30 Satoshi Nagai; 31 Manabu Mima; 40 Tomohiro Tsuchiya; 41 Koji Aoyama; 42 Ken Ray; 44 Takashi Saito; 45 Takashi Kawai; 53 Jim Heuser; 54 Daisuke Kato; 57 Shinichiro Koyama; 58 Wataru Karashima; 59 Yasunori Kikuchi; 61 Keiji Uezono; 64 Hiroyuki Fukuyama; 69 Brandon Duckworth; 90 Sho Miyagawa	Catchers: 27 Takero Okajima; 37 Motohiro Shima; 48 Tadashi Ishimine; 65 Keiji Oyama; Infielders: 2 Takumi Miyoshi; 3 Casey McGehee; 4 Yosuke Takasu; 6 Kazuya Fujita; 7 Kazuo Matsui; 9 Toshihito Abe; 32 Shintaro Masuda; 33 Ginji Akaminai; 43 Yusuke Kosai; 55 Tetsuro Nishida; 56 Taishi Nakagawa; 67 Tatsuro Iwasaki; 68 Hiroki Nakazawa	Outfielders: 0 Makoto Moriyama; 5 Akihisa Makida; 8 Toshiya Nakashima; 23 Ryo Hijirisawa; 25 Andruw Jones; 35 Hiroaki Shimauchi; 36 Aoi Enomoto; 46 Teppei Tsuchiya	Manager: 77 Senichi Hoshino; Coaches: 80 Toru Nimura (head); 82 Tomio Tashiro (hitting); 89 Yosuke Hiraishi (asst. hitting); 71 Yoshinori Sato (pitching); 72 Ryoji Moriyama (bullpen); 70 Takashi Miwa (battery); 73 Yasutomo Suzuki (infield defense/baserunning); 76 Osamu Yonemura (outfield defense/baserunning)

== Player statistics ==
=== Batting ===
2013 Tohoku Rakuten Golden Eagles batting statistics
Player	G	AB	R	H	2B	3B	HR	RBI	SB	BB	K	AVG	OBP	SLG	TB
Toshihito Abe	22	38	4	8	2	0	0	1	1	2	7	.211	.250	.263	10
Ginji Akaminai	131	482	63	153	24	3	4	54	3	36	44	.317	.365	.405	195
Brandon Duckworth	18	2	0	0	0	0	0	0	0	0	0	.000	.000	.000	0
Aoi Enomoto	13	11	1	1	1	0	0	2	0	0	5	.091	.091	.182	2
Kazuya Fujita	128	466	48	128	17	2	1	48	3	21	43	.275	.320	.326	152
Ryo Hijirisawa	120	433	51	123	17	4	2	40	21	44	100	.284	.357	.356	154
Tadashi Ishimine	19	32	2	4	0	0	1	6	0	0	8	.125	.118	.219	7
Tatsuro Iwasaki	74	101	17	22	5	0	0	12	0	5	18	.218	.252	.267	27
Andruw Jones	143	478	81	116	21	1	26	94	4	105	164	.243	.391	.454	217
Yusuke Kosai	22	46	3	11	3	0	1	3	0	1	7	.239	.255	.370	17
Shinichiro Koyama	45	0	0	0	0	0	0	0	0	0	0	.000	.000	.000	0
Akihisa Makida	27	81	15	18	3	1	2	7	0	7	6	.222	.292	.358	29
Shintaro Masuda	86	268	32	73	17	0	8	47	1	33	81	.272	.352	.425	114
Kazuo Matsui	125	448	55	111	26	2	11	58	1	40	85	.248	.311	.388	174
Casey McGehee	144	513	78	150	30	0	28	93	2	70	119	.292	.376	.515	264
Manabu Mima	18	1	0	0	0	0	0	0	0	0	1	.000	.000	.000	0
Takumi Miyoshi	6	4	0	0	0	0	0	0	0	0	1	.000	.000	.000	0
Makoto Moriyama	89	81	20	22	0	0	0	9	11	8	10	.272	.344	.272	22
Satoshi Nagai	10	3	0	0	0	0	0	0	0	0	3	.000	.000	.000	0
Taishi Nakagawa	1	2	0	0	0	0	0	0	0	0	1	.000	.000	.000	0
Toshiya Nakashima	45	82	7	19	4	0	1	3	0	6	8	.232	.284	.317	26
Hiroki Nakazawa	14	8	1	2	0	0	0	1	0	0	1	.250	.250	.250	2
Tetsuro Nishida	26	48	3	8	1	0	0	2	1	2	14	.167	.200	.188	9
Takahiro Norimoto	27	7	0	0	0	0	0	0	0	1	6	.000	.125	.000	0
Takero Okajima	79	226	40	73	9	1	1	13	3	27	31	.323	.405	.385	87
Keiji Oyama	5	6	0	1	0	0	0	0	0	2	2	.167	.375	.167	1
Motohiro Shima	134	447	44	115	13	1	4	48	3	39	92	.257	.318	.318	142
Hiroaki Shimauchi	97	299	36	85	6	4	6	38	6	21	44	.284	.326	.391	117
Yosuke Takasu	21	50	3	8	1	0	0	3	0	2	6	.160	.189	.180	9
Masahiro Tanaka	28	6	0	1	1	0	0	1	0	0	2	.167	.167	.333	2
Kenji Tomura	12	4	0	0	0	0	0	0	0	0	3	.000	.000	.000	0
Teppei Tsuchiya	54	146	24	35	7	1	1	10	2	15	22	.240	.311	.322	47
Total：32 players	144	4,819	628	1,287	208	20	97	593	62	487	934	.267	.338	.379	1,826

Bold/italics denotes best in the league

=== Pitching ===
2013 Tohoku Rakuten Golden Eagles pitching statistics
Player	W	L	ERA	G	GS	SV	IP	H	R	ER	BB	K
Koji Aoyama	3	5	3.43	60	0	11	60.1	61	24	23	20	60
Brandon Duckworth	5	5	4.31	18	17	0	87.2	91	46	42	37	64
Hiroyuki Fukuyama	0	0	4.41	22	0	0	34.2	34	17	17	10	20
Kohei Hasebe	1	1	1.83	24	1	3	34.1	24	7	7	10	31
Jim Heuser	2	2	6.03	22	5	0	37.1	42	29	25	19	32
Tomoki Hoshino	0	1	12.71	11	0	0	5.2	8	10	8	6	4
Yoshinao Kamata	1	2	12.51	8	2	0	13.2	24	19	19	8	11
Norihito Kaneto	1	0	1.85	39	0	0	34	30	8	7	6	25
Wataru Karashima	3	4	4.42	11	10	0	59	63	31	29	19	45
Hiroshi Katayama	3	1	3.03	31	0	0	35.2	38	12	12	16	22
Daisuke Kato	0	2	8.71	6	0	0	10.1	17	13	10	10	4
Takashi Kawai	3	2	3.00	6	6	0	30	33	10	10	5	13
Yasunori Kikuchi	1	5	6.48	14	5	0	33.1	38	28	24	23	22
Shinichiro Koyama	1	4	3.94	45	0	0	45.2	40	22	20	20	42
Manabu Mima	6	5	4.12	18	18	0	98.1	118	46	45	31	63
Sho Miyagawa	2	0	2.45	17	2	0	40.1	41	11	11	21	33
Satoshi Nagai	2	4	3.46	10	9	0	54.2	47	22	21	15	31
Takahiro Norimoto	15	8	3.34	27	25	0	170	142	65	63	51	134
Darrell Rasner	1	2	3.35	37	0	17	37.2	31	14	14	11	40
Ken Ray	0	1	3.26	5	3	0	19.1	13	10	7	10	10
Takashi Saito	3	0	2.36	30	0	4	26.2	25	7	7	10	25
Kazuya Takahori	1	0	6.39	14	0	0	12.2	14	9	9	7	5
Masahiro Tanaka	24	0	1.27	28	27	1	212	168	35	30	32	183
Kenji Tomura	4	2	3.33	12	12	0	67.2	63	27	25	28	22
Tomohiro Tsuchiya	0	0	5.68	5	0	0	6.1	9	4	4	0	6
Keiji Uezono	0	3	7.24	5	2	0	13.2	16	11	11	5	11
Total：26 players	82	59	3.51	144	144	36	1281	1230	537	500	430	958

Bold/italics denotes best in the league

== Awards and honors ==
Matsutaro Shoriki Award

- Senichi Hoshino
- Masahiro Tanaka - special award

Pacific League Most Valuable Player

- Masahiro Tanaka

Eiji Sawamura Award

- Masahiro Tanaka

Pacific League Rookie of the Year

- Takahiro Norimoto

Japan Series Most Valuable Player

- Manabu Mima

Nippon Life Monthly MVP Award

- Masahiro Tanaka - May, June, July, August, September (pitcher)

Best Nine Award

- Masahiro Tanaka - pitcher
- Motohiro Shima - catcher
- Kazuya Fujita - second baseman
- Casey McGehee - third baseman

Mitsui Golden Glove Award

- Masahiro Tanaka - pitcher
- Motohiro Shima - catcher
- Kazuya Fujita - second baseman

Best Battery Award

- Masahiro Tanaka - pitcher
- Motohiro Shima - catcher

All-Star Series selections

- Masahiro Tanaka - pitcher
- Koji Aoyama - pitcher
- Motohiro Shima - catcher
- Kazuo Matsui - infielder
- Andruw Jones - designated hitter

All-Star Game Fighting Spirit Award

- Masahiro Tanaka - Game 1

SKY PerfecTV! Sayonara Award

- Motohiro Shima - July (July 26)

== Farm team ==
2013 Eastern League regular season standings
Pos	Team	G	W	L	T	Pct.	GB	Home	Road
1	Tokyo Yakult Swallows^{†}	108	60	42	6	.588	—	31–21–2	29–21–4
2	Chiba Lotte Marines	108	58	45	5	.563	2½	27–24–3	31–21–2
3	Yomiuri Giants	114	61	48	5	.5360	2½	30–20–4	31–28–1
4	Yokohama DeNA BayStars	108	58	46	4	.558	3	30–22–2	28–24–2
5	Tohoku Rakuten Golden Eagles	108	56	49	3	.533	5½	28–24–2	28–25–1
6	Saitama Seibu Lions	108	41	63	4	.394	20	19–33–2	22–30–2
7	Hokkaido Nippon-Ham Fighters	110	32	73	5	.305	29½	18–37–1	14–36–4

^{†} League champion

== Nippon Professional Baseball draft ==
2013 Tohoku Rakuten Golden Eagles draft selections
Round	Name	Position	Affiliation	Signed?
1	Yuki Matsui	Pitcher	Toko Gakuen High School	Yes
2	Yasuhito Uchida	Catcher	Joso Gakuin High School	Yes
3	Kodai Hamaya	Pitcher	Honda Suzuka	Yes
4	Yuri Furukawa	Pitcher	Arita Technical High School	Yes
5	Yusuke Nishimiya	Pitcher	Yokohama College of Commerce	Yes
6	Takaaki Yokoyama	Pitcher	Waseda University	Yes
7	Kazutomo Aihara	Pitcher	The 77 Bank	Yes
8	Susumu Aizawa	Pitcher	Nippon Paper Industries Ishinomaki	Yes
9	Ryuta Konno	Pitcher	Iwadeyama High School	Yes
