= Toshihito =

- Pronunciation: toɕiçito (IPA)
- Gender: Male

Origin
- Origin: Japanese
- Meaning: Different meanings depending on the kanji used

Other names
- Alternative spelling: Tosihito (Kunrei-shiki) Tosihito (Nihon-shiki) Toshihito (Hepburn)

Toshihito is a masculine Japanese given name.

== Written forms ==
Toshihito can be written using different combinations of kanji characters. Some examples:

- 敏仁, "agile, humanity"
- 敏人, "agile, person"
- 俊仁, "talented, humanity"
- 俊人, "talented, person"
- 利仁, "benefit, humanity"
- 利人, "benefit, person"
- 年仁, "year, humanity"
- 年人, "year, person"
- 寿仁, "long life, humanity"
- 寿人, "long life, person"

The name can also be written in hiragana としひと or katakana トシヒト.

== Notable people with the name ==
- Toshihito Abe (阿部 俊人, born 1988), Japanese baseball player.
- Toshihito Fujiwara (藤原 利仁, unknown birth and death dates), Japanese general.
- Prince Hachijō Toshihito (八条宮 智仁親王, 1579–1629), Japanese prince.
- Toshihito Ishimaru (石丸 利人, born 1931), Japanese boxer.
- Toshihito Ito (伊藤 俊人, 1962–2002), Japanese actor.
