= Jim Heuser =

American baseball player (born 1984)

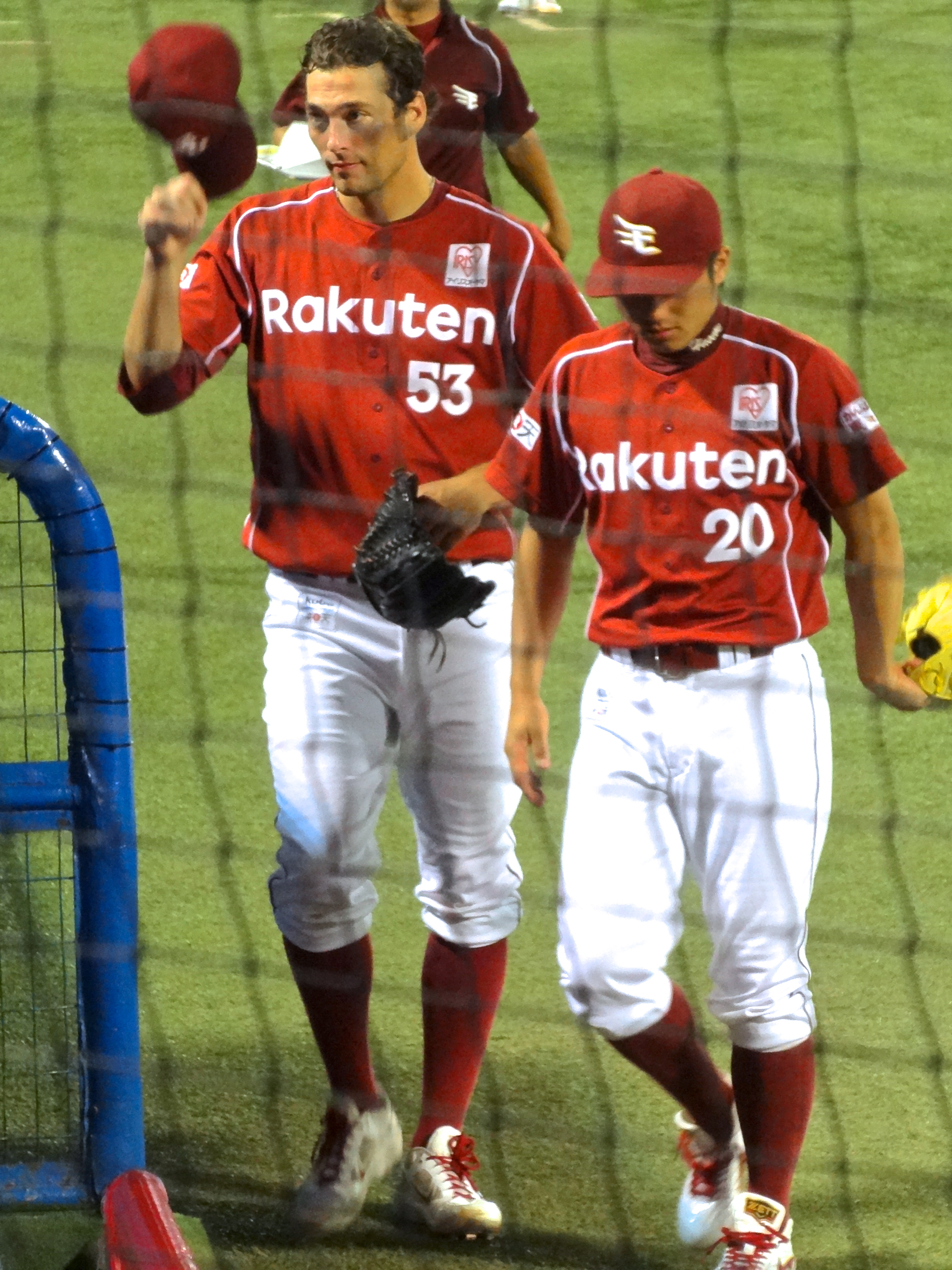
- Heuser (left) with the Rakuten Eagles in 2013
- Pitcher
- Born: March 30, 1984 (age 41); Spring Valley, Illinois, U.S.
- Bats: Left Throws: Left
- NPB: April 4, 2012, for the Tohoku Rakuten Golden Eagles
- NPB: October 30, 2013, for the Tohoku Rakuten Golden Eagles

NPB statistics
- Win–loss record: 3–4
- Earned run average: 4.41
- Strikeouts: 61
- Stats at Baseball Reference

Teams
- Tohoku Rakuten Golden Eagles (2012–2013)

Career highlights and awards
- Japan Series champion (2013)

James Adam Heuser (born March 30, 1984) is an American former professional baseball pitcher. He played in Nippon Professional Baseball (NPB) for the Tohoku Rakuten Golden Eagles. He started Game 4 of the 2013 Japan Series against the Yomiuri Giants, ultimately helping the Eagles win their first and only championship.

== Professional career ==
=== Major League Baseball ===
Heuser was selected in the 27th round (812th overall) by the Oakland Athletics in the 2003 MLB draft. He was released from the A's organization on July 10, 2009, after never having played in a Major League Baseball game. After being released, Heuser played for the York Revolution and Lancaster Barnstormers of the independent Atlantic League in 2010. During the offseason of 2010, he almost joined Nippon Professional Baseball's (NPB) Yokohama BayStars, but ultimately decided against it. Instead, Heuser studied renewable energy at Georgia State University in 2011.

=== Nippon Professional Baseball ===
After not pitching for a year and a half, Heuser again looked toward NPB and tried out for the Tohoku Rakuten Golden Eagles during their spring training camp in February 2012. Rakuten signed him to developmental player contract later that month. By the end of March, he was pitching in spring training exhibition games. With Hiroshi Katayama as the team's only other left-handed relief pitcher, Heuser was being considered to be added to first team's roster, and he was registered to the first team on March 29. Heuser pitched in 58 games for Rakuten in 2012. He continued to pitch in 2013, and despite a relatively poor season, Heuser was on the Eagles' 2013 Japan Series roster and started Game 4.

After the team won the championship, Rakuten released Heuser and he was unable to find a new team for 2014 baseball season. During that time, he underwent rehabilitation in Atlanta, Georgia, for injuries to his left shoulder and right arm. In November of that year, it was announced that he would again participate in a test with Rakuten during their fall camp. Heuser was again signed by Rakuten to a one-year, ¥12 million contract on January 26, 2015. He did not play with the first team that season, however, and was removed from the roster on July 29, midseason, after being placed on waivers.

== Personal life ==
Heuser enjoys cycling and playing guitar.
