= Makoto Moriyama =

Japanese baseball player

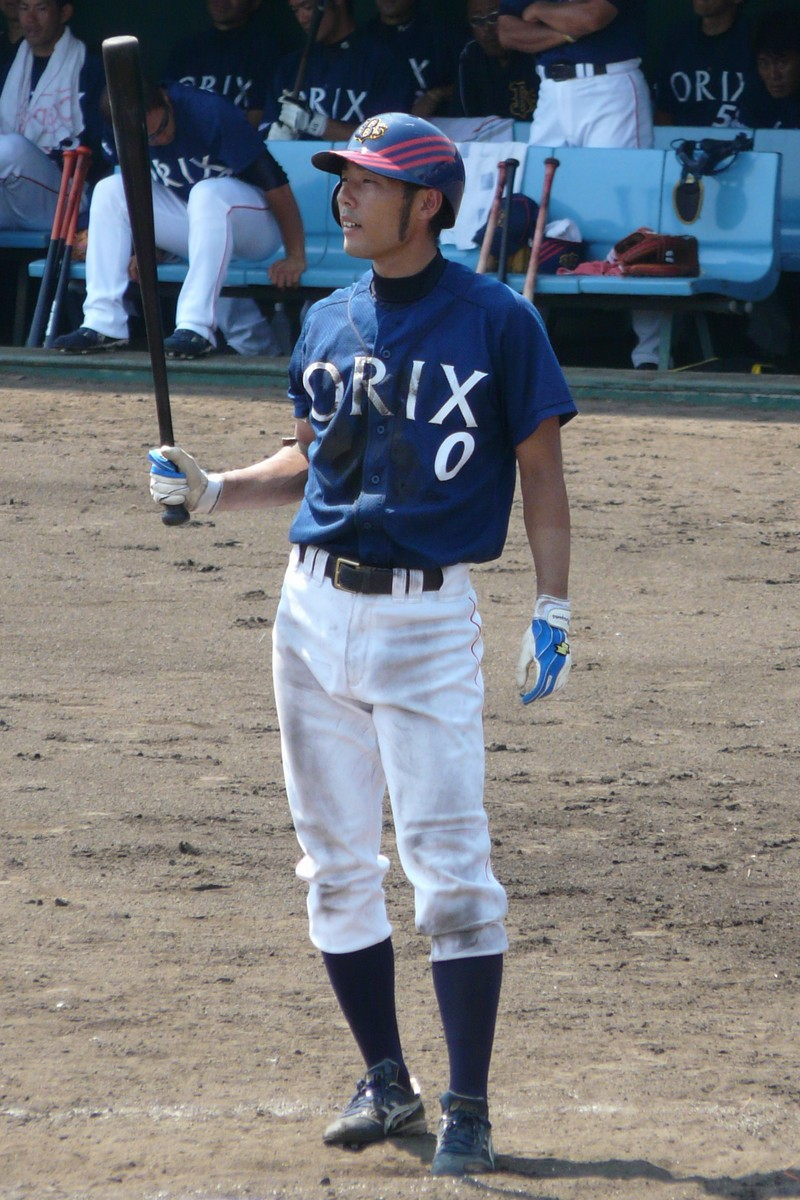
- Moriyama with the Orix Buffaloes
- Outfielder / Coach
- Born: May 5, 1984 (age 42); Kawanishi, Hyōgo
- Bats: Left Throws: Right

NPB debut
- May 20, 2006, for the Orix Buffaloes

NPB statistics (through 2015)
- Batting average: .241
- Home runs: 0
- Run batted in: 28
- Stats at Baseball Reference

Teams
- As player: Orix Buffaloes (2006–2012); Tohoku Rakuten Golden Eagles (2013–2015); As coach: Tohoku Rakuten Golden Eagles (2016–2018)

Career highlights and awards
- 1× Japan Series champion (2013)

Makoto Moriyama (森山 周, born August 11, 1981) is a Japanese former professional baseball outfielder in Japan's Nippon Professional Baseball. He played for the Orix Buffaloes from 2006 to 2012 and the Tohoku Rakuten Golden Eagles from 2013 to 2015.
