= Yoshinao Kamata =

Japanese baseball player

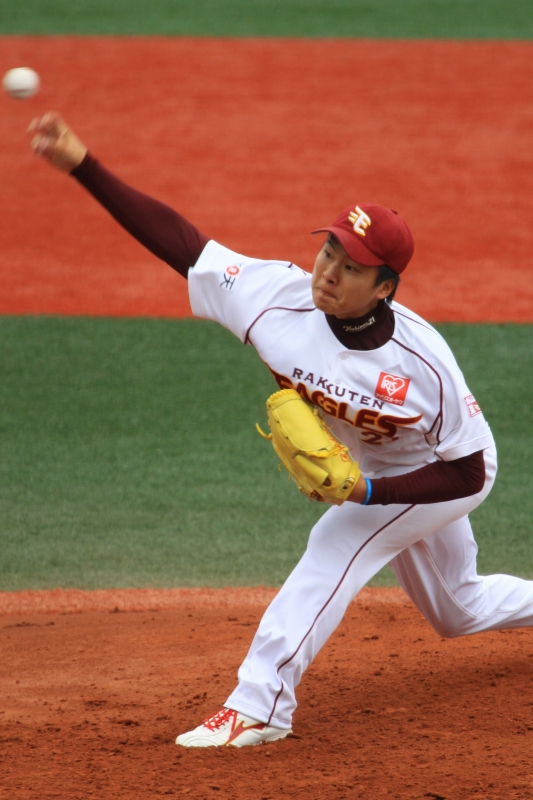
- Kamata with the Tohoku Rakuten Golden Eagles
- Pitcher
- Born: October 26, 1993 (age 32)
- Batted: Right Threw: Right

NPB debut
- May 20, 2012, for the Tohoku Rakuten Golden Eagles

Last NPB appearance
- August 25, 2022, for the Tohoku Rakuten Golden Eagles

NPB statistics (through 2022 season)
- Win–loss record: 21-16
- ERA: 4.86
- Strikeouts: 243
- Saves: 0
- Holds: 2
- Stats at Baseball Reference

Teams
- Tohoku Rakuten Golden Eagles (2012–2013, 2015–2022)

Career highlights and awards
- Japan Series champion (2013)

Yoshinao Kamata (釜田 佳直, born October 26, 1993, in Komatsu, Ishikawa) is a Japanese professional baseball pitcher for the Tohoku Rakuten Golden Eagles in Japan's Nippon Professional Baseball.
