= Hiroki Nakazawa =

Japanese baseball player (born 1987)

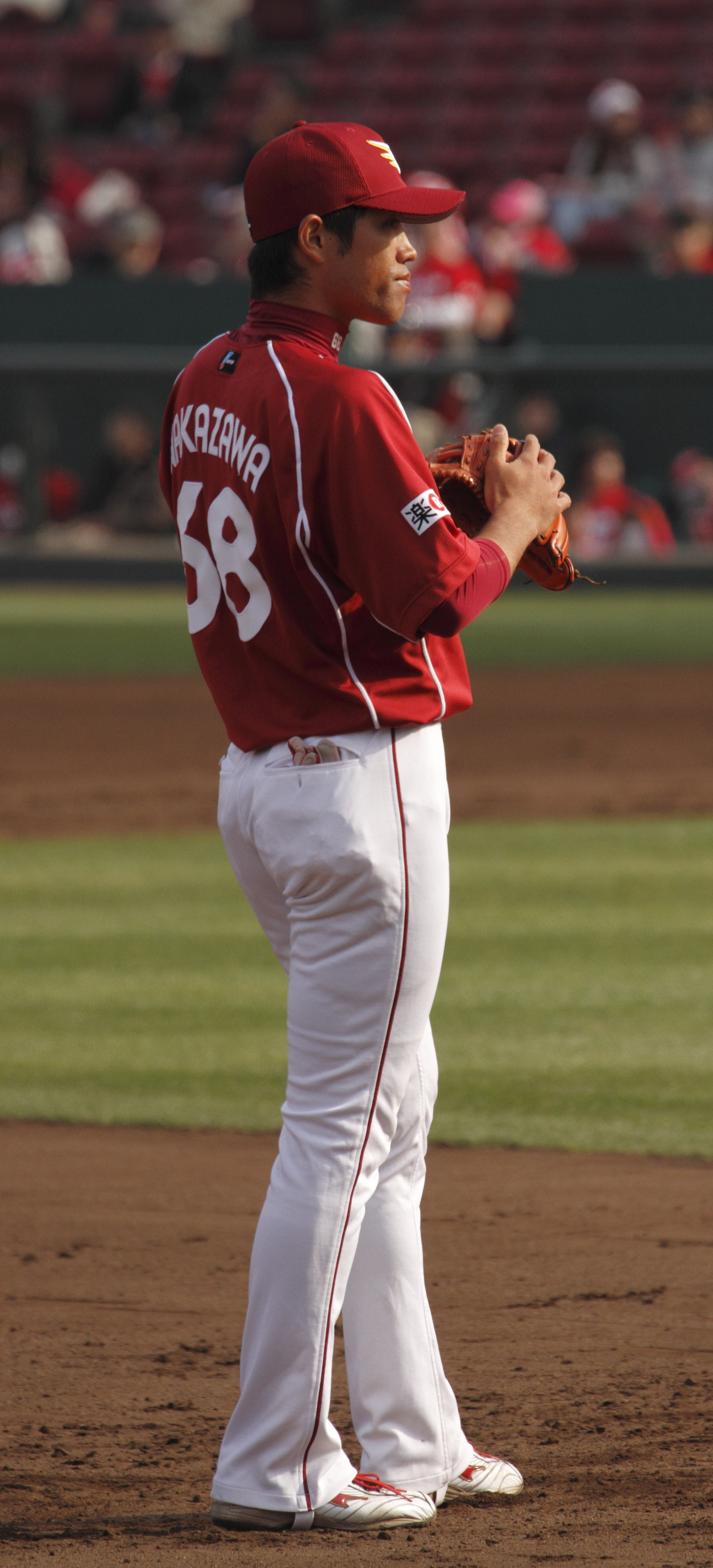
- Infielder
- Born: January 22, 1987 (age 39)
- Bats: Right Throws: Right

NPB debut
- April 28, 2013, for the Tohoku Rakuten Golden Eagles

NPB statistics (through 2013 season)
- Batting average: .250
- Home runs: 0
- RBI: 1
- Stats at Baseball Reference

Teams
- Yomiuri Giants (2009–2012); Tohoku Rakuten Golden Eagles (2013–2014)

Hiroki Nakazawa (仲澤 広基, born January 22, 1987) is a Japanese professional baseball infielder for the Tohoku Rakuten Golden Eagles in Japan's Nippon Professional Baseball. He previously played with the Yomiuri Giants.
