= Taishi Nakagawa (baseball) =

Japanese baseball player (born 1990)

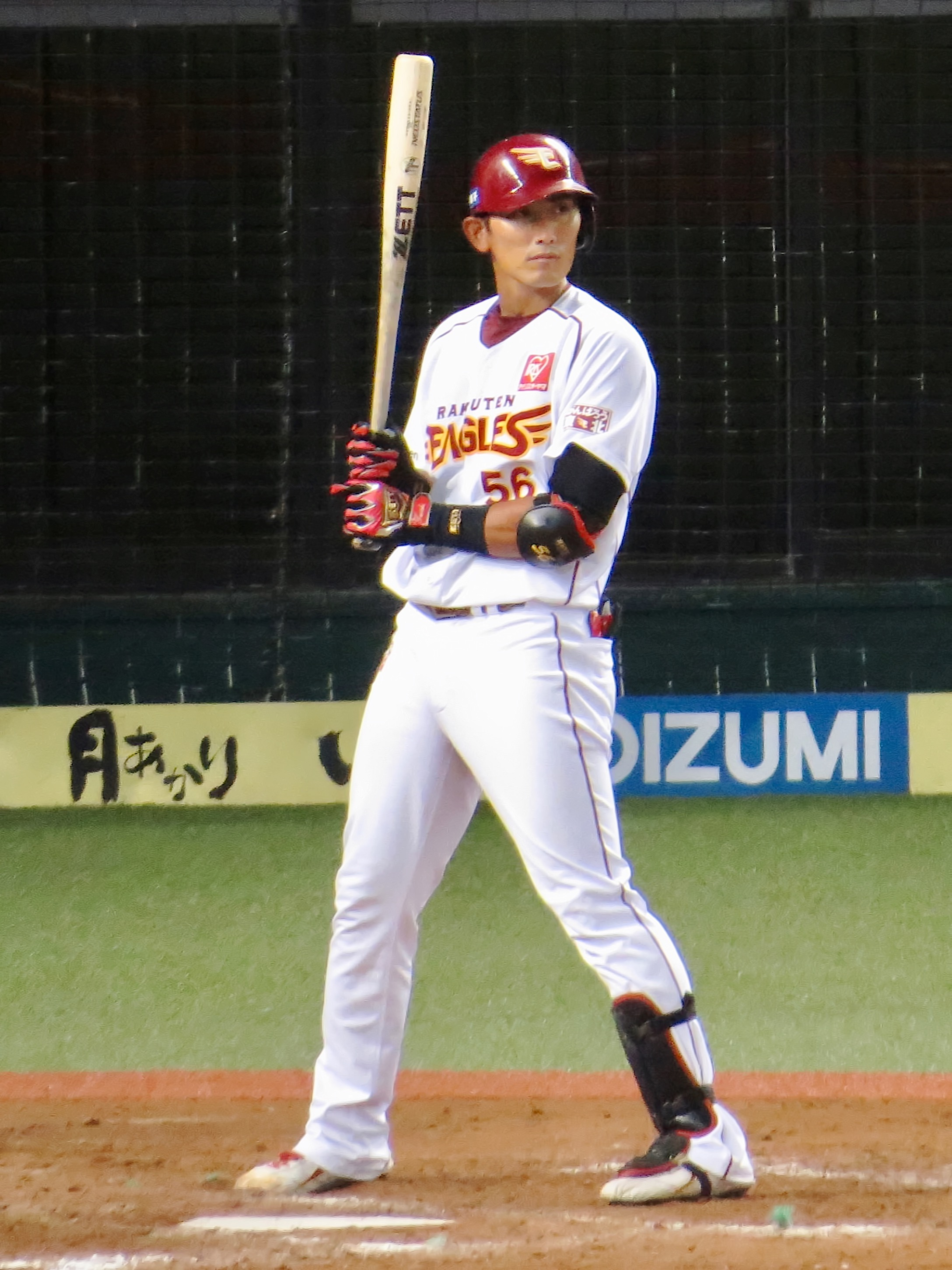
- Nakagawa with the Tohoku Rakuten Golden Eagles
- Infielder
- Born: June 8, 1990 (age 35); Toyohashi, Aichi, Japan
- Bats: Right Throws: Right

NPB debut
- September 22, 2010, for the Tohoku Rakuten Golden Eagles

Career statistics (through 2019 season)
- Batting average: .204
- Home runs: 9
- Runs batted in: 52

Teams
- Tohoku Rakuten Golden Eagles (2009–2017); Yokohama DeNA BayStars (2018–2019)

Taishi Nakagawa (中川 大志, Nakagawa Taishi; born June 8, 1990 in Toyohashi, Aichi, Japan) is a professional Japanese baseball player. He plays infielder for the Yokohama DeNA BayStars. Between 2009 and 2017 he played for the Tohoku Rakuten Golden Eagles.
