= Akita Prefectural Baseball Stadium =

Sports venue in Akita, Japan

- Komachi Stadium

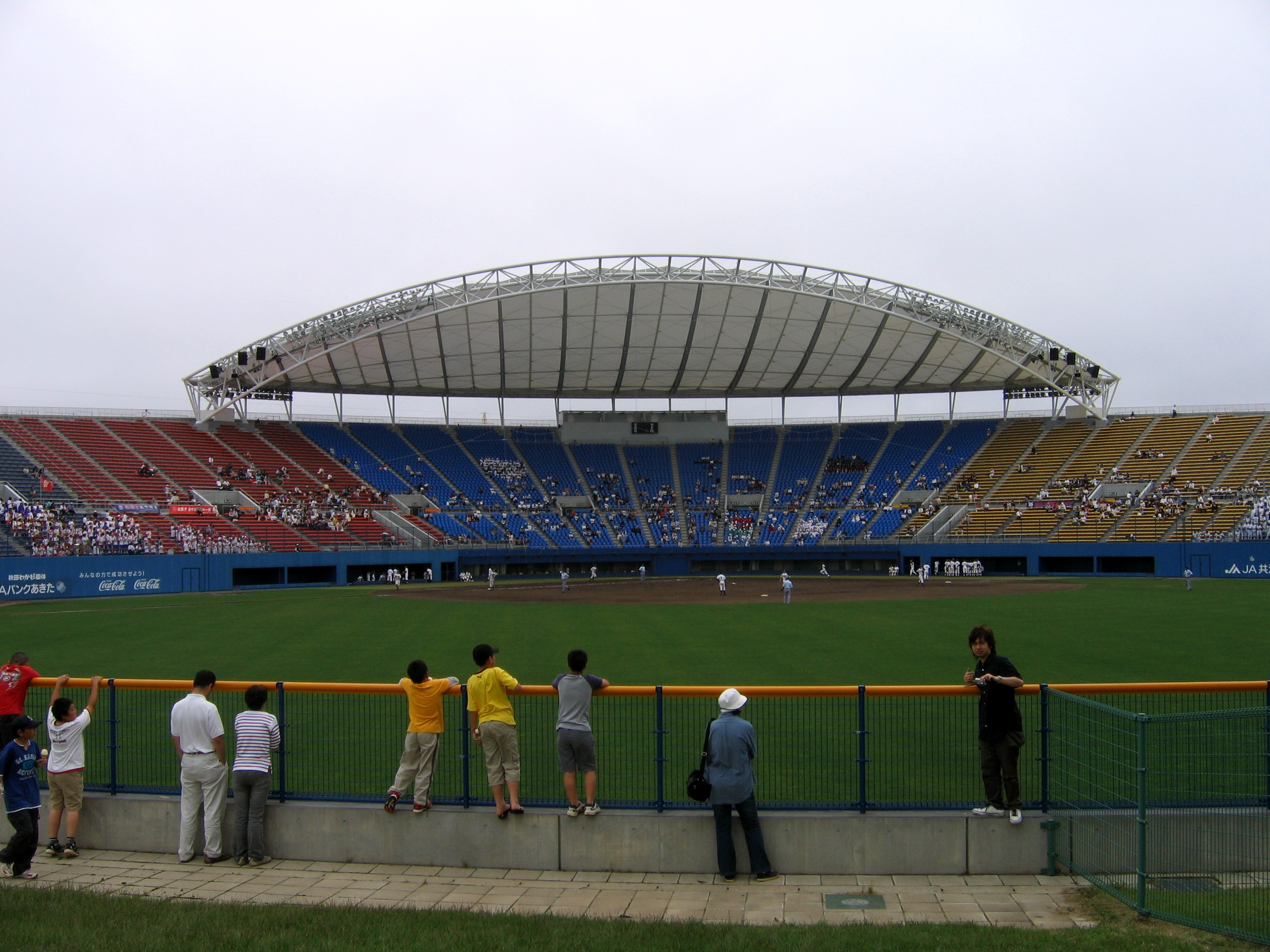
- Interactive map of Akita Prefectural Baseball Stadium
- Location: Akita, Japan
- Coordinates: 39°43′34.0″N 140°4′10.6″E
- Owner: Akita prefecture
- Capacity: 25,000
- Field size: left - 100 m (328.08 ft) center - 122 m (400.3 ft) right - 100 m (328.08 ft)

Construction
- Opened: 2003

Tenant
- Japanese High School Baseball Championship Akita Regional

Website
- http://www.akisouko.com/komachi/

Akita Prefectural Baseball Stadium (1974)
- 秋田県立球場
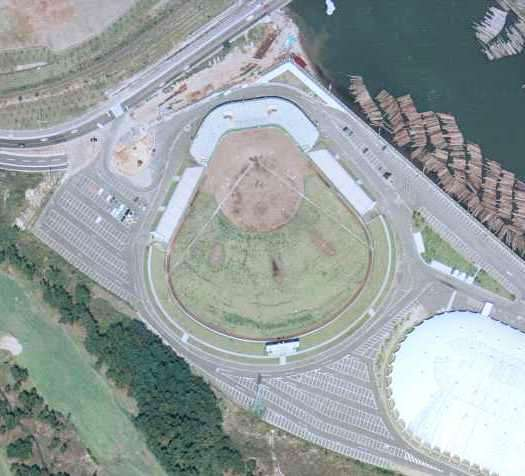
- Aerial view in 1975

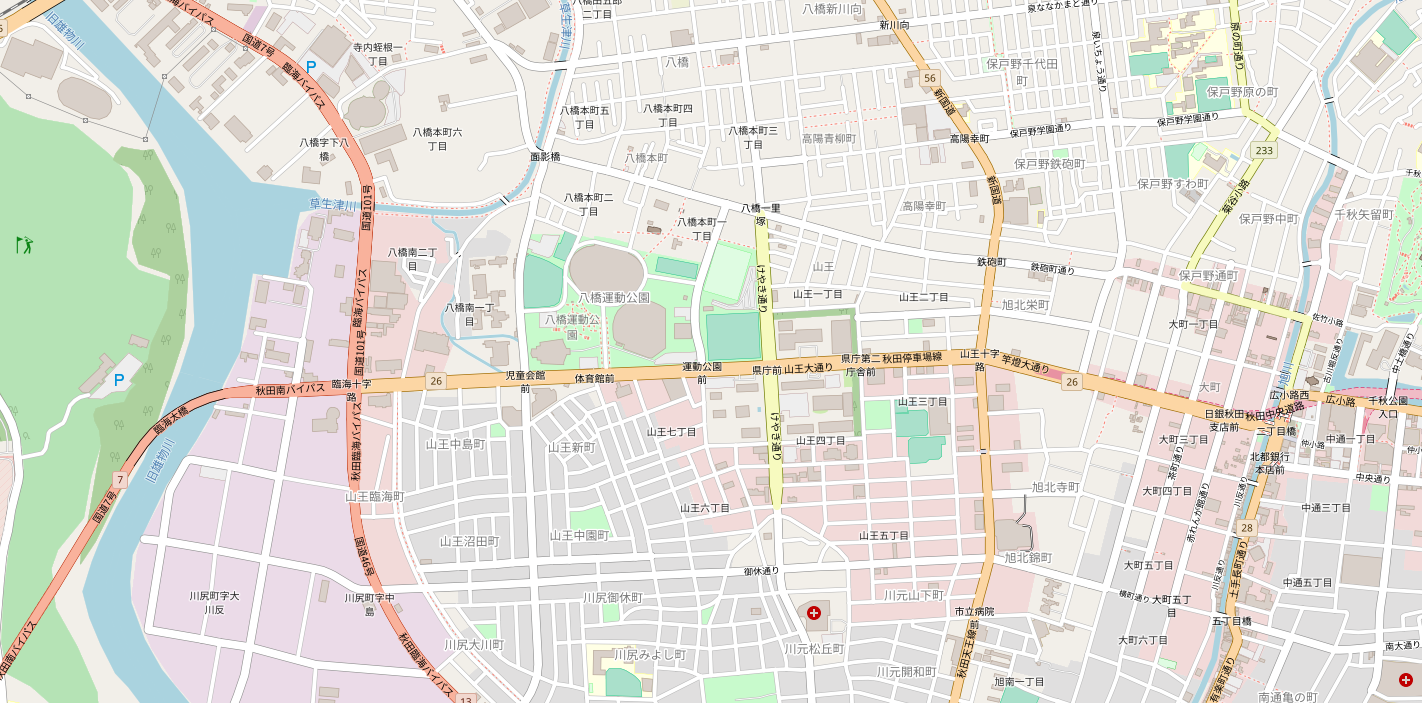
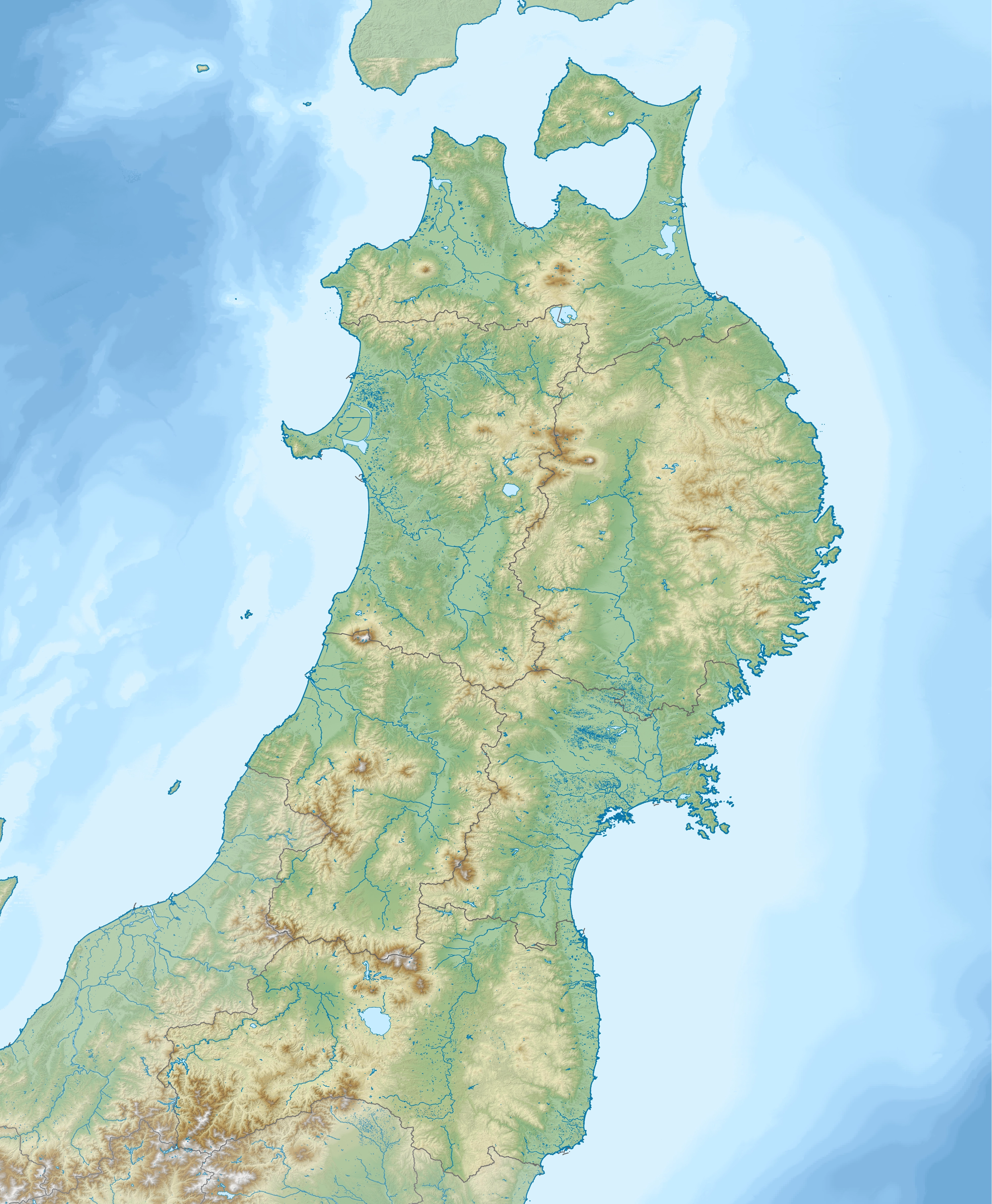
- Location within Akita, Akita Location within Akita Prefecture Location within Tohoku, Japan Location within Japan
- Interactive map of Akita Prefectural Baseball Stadium (1974)
- Coordinates: 39°43′37.52″N 140°4′36″E
- Owner: Akita prefecture
- Capacity: 12,000
- Field size: left - 97.5 m (319.88 ft) center - 122 m (400.3 ft) right - 97.5 m (319.88 ft)

Construction
- Opened: 1974
- Closed: 2002

Akita Prefectural Baseball Stadium is a baseball stadium in the city of Akita, Japan. The stadium was built in 2003 and has an all-seated capacity of 25,000. It has the nickname of 'Komachi Stadium', and it is the largest baseball park in the prefecture.

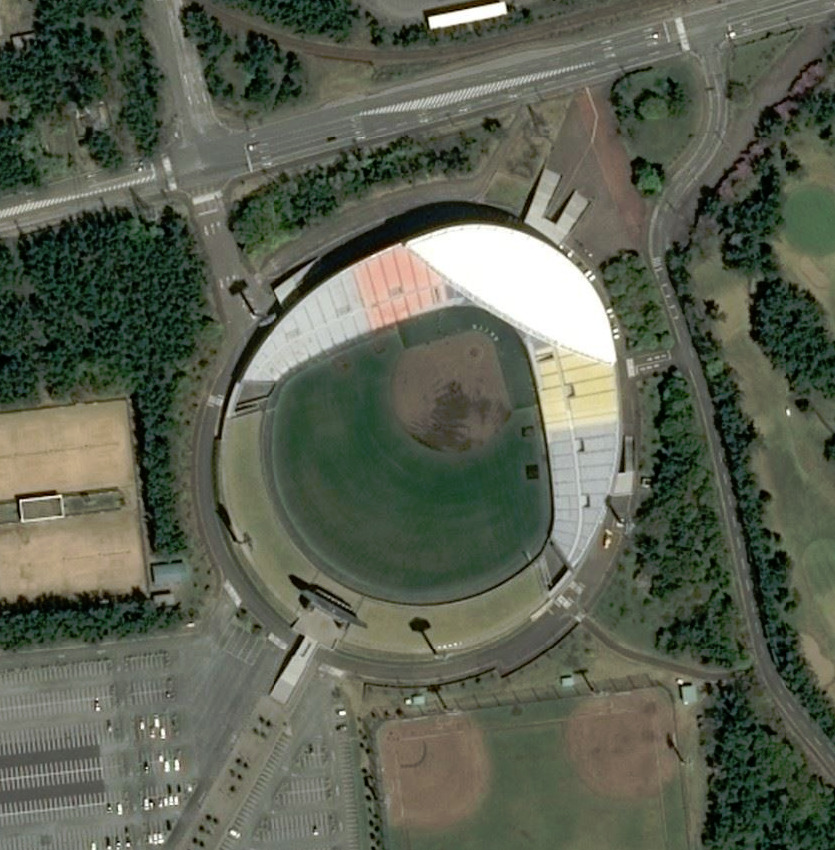
Satellite view

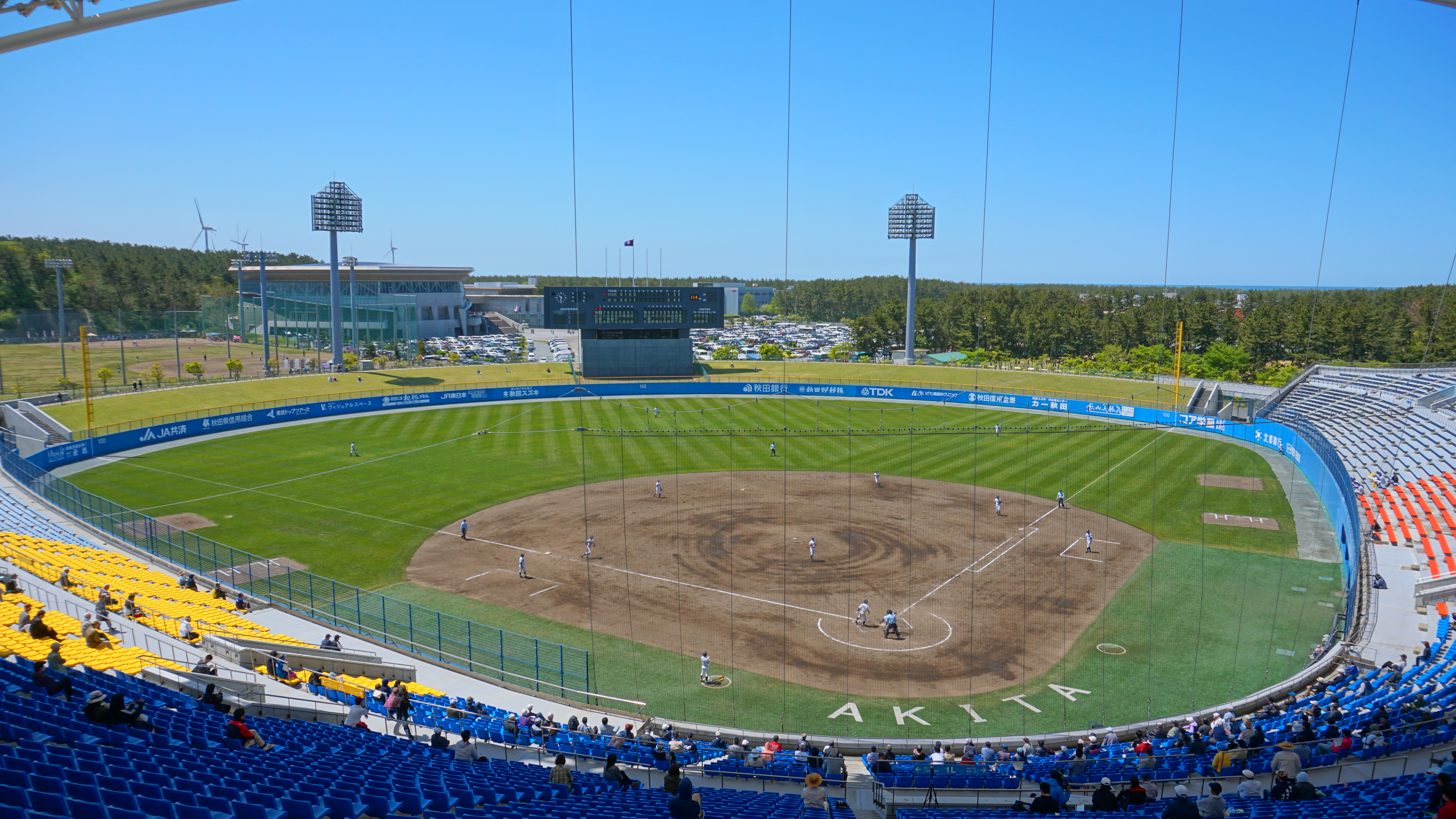
Akita Prefectural Baseball Stadium
