= Kenji Tomura =

Japanese baseball player

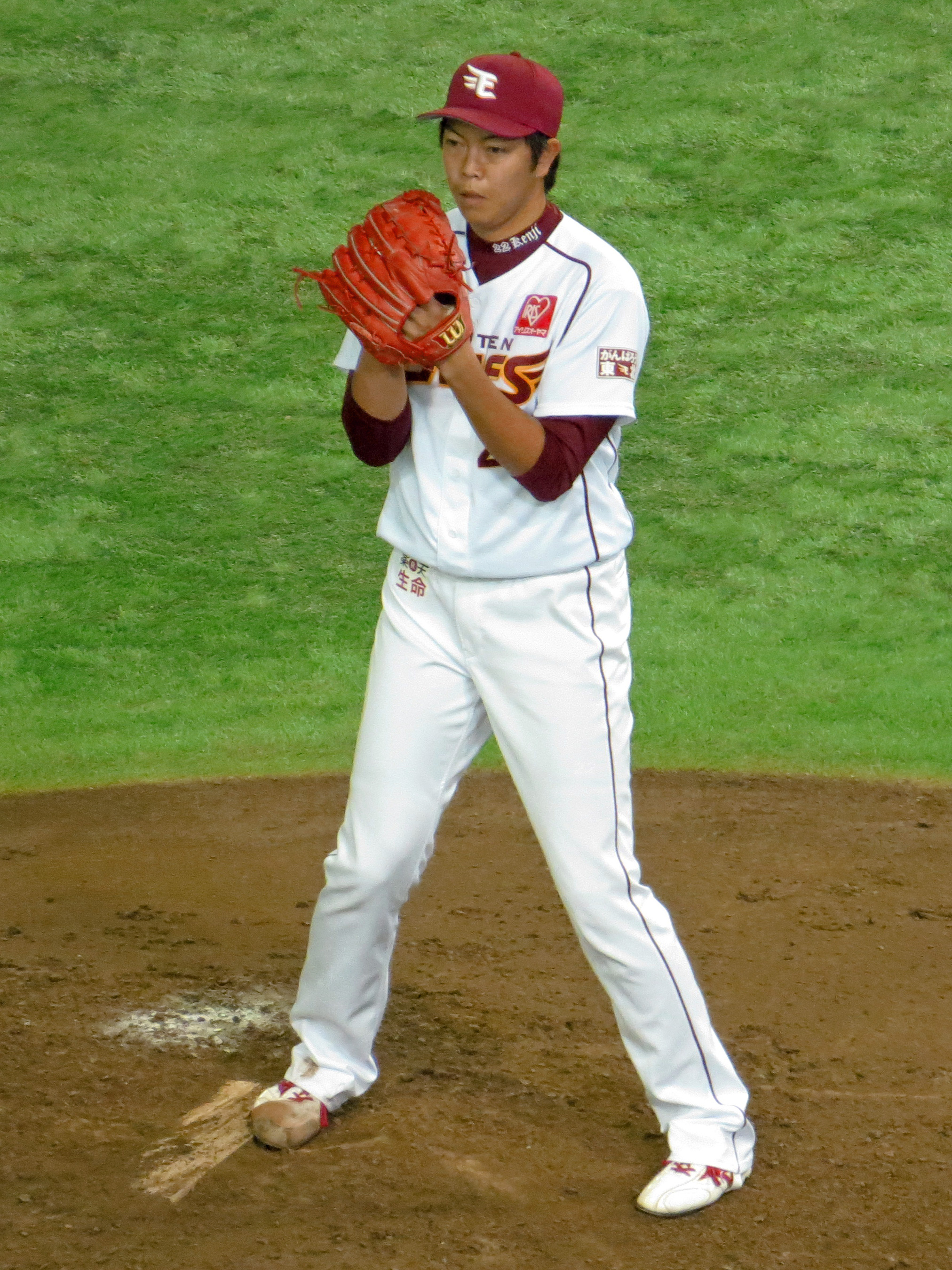
- Pitcher
- Born: October 20, 1987 (age 38)
- Bats: Right Throws: Right

NPB debut
- April 21, 2010, for the Tohoku Rakuten Golden Eagles

Teams
- Tohoku Rakuten Golden Eagles (2010–2019)

Career highlights and awards
- 1x Japan Series champion (2013)

Kenji Tomura (戸村 健次, born August 20, 1987) is a Japanese professional baseball pitcher for the Tohoku Rakuten Golden Eagles in Japan's Nippon Professional Baseball.
