= Tatsuro Iwasaki =

Japanese baseball player (born 1984)

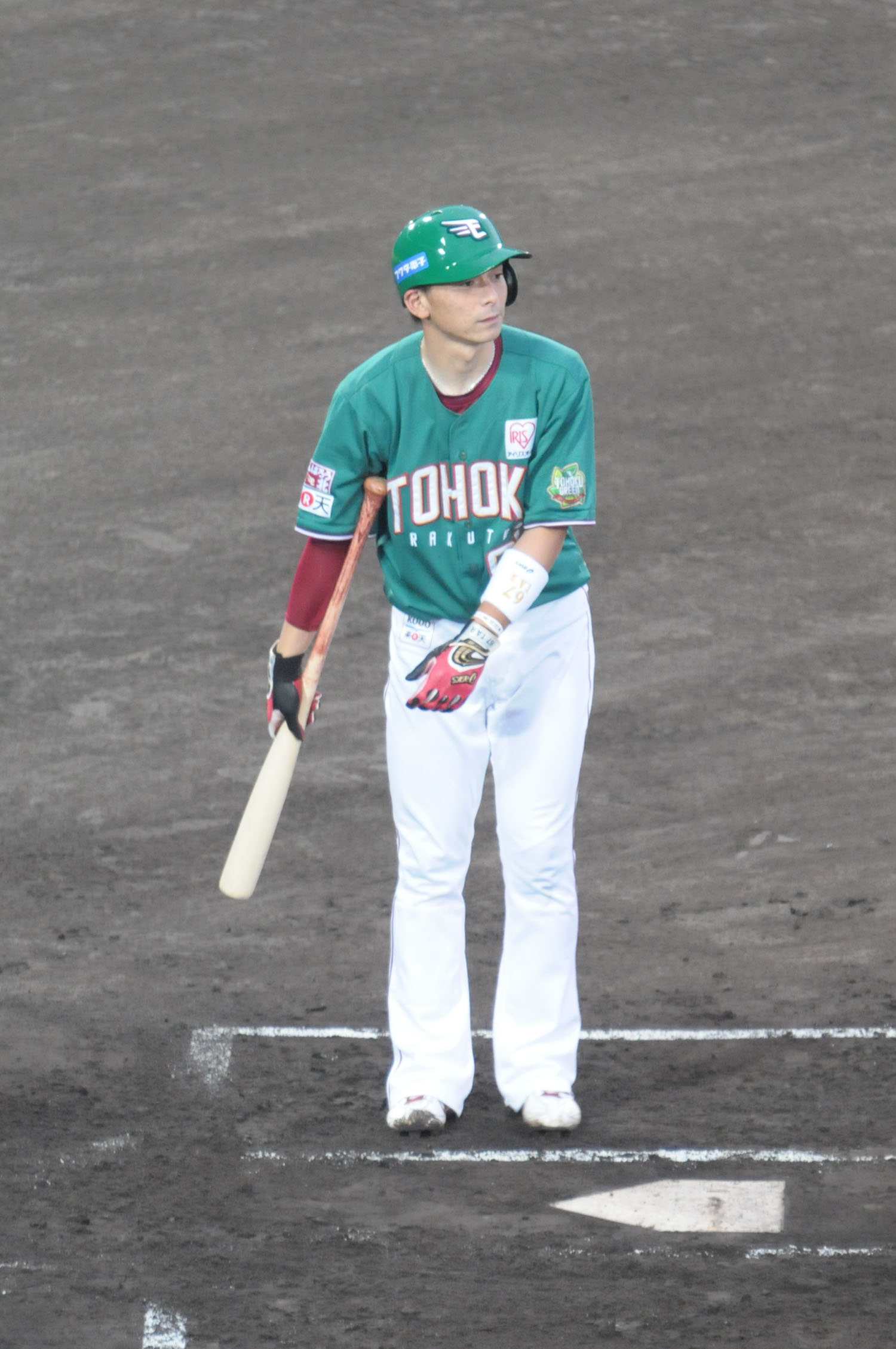
- Iwasaki with the Tohoku Rakuten Golden Eagles
- Infielder
- Born: December 28, 1984 (age 41); Seya-ku, Yokohama, Kanagawa, Japan
- Bats: Right Throws: Right

NPB debut
- 2008, for the Chunichi Dragons

NPB statistics (through 2017)
- Batting average: .197
- Home runs: 1
- RBI: 33
- Stats at Baseball Reference

Teams
- Chunichi Dragons (2008–2012, 2017); Tohoku Rakuten Golden Eagles (2013–2015)

Career highlights and awards
- Japan Series champion (2013)

Tatsuro Iwasaki (岩崎 達郎, born December 28, 1984, in Yokohama, Kanagawa Prefecture) is a Japanese former professional baseball infielder in Japan's Nippon Professional Baseball. He played for the Chunichi Dragons from 2008 to 2012 and again in 2017 and with the Tohoku Rakuten Golden Eagles from 2013 to 2015.
