= Takumi Miyoshi =

Japanese baseball player (born 1993)

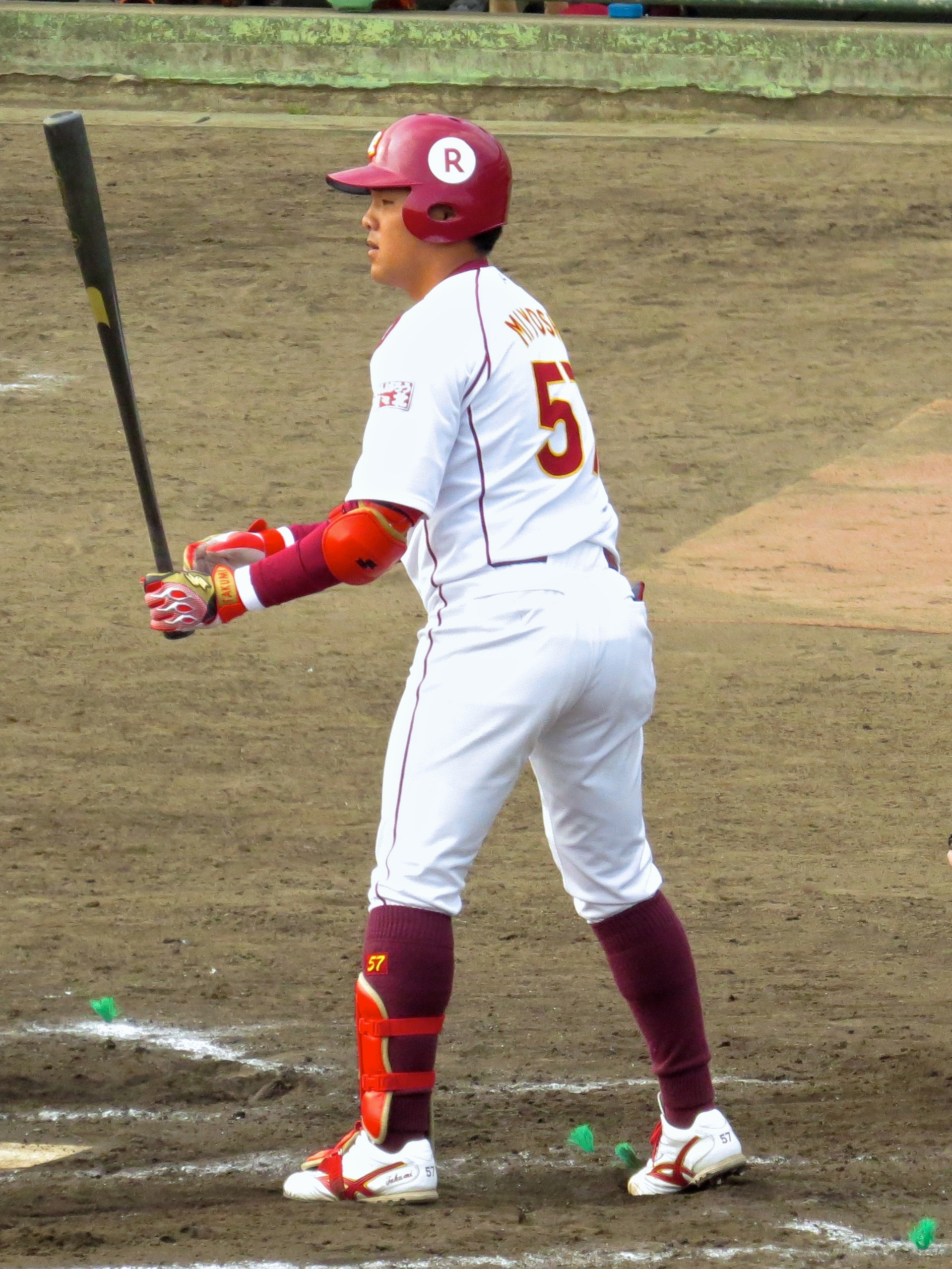
- Miyoshi with the Tohoku Rakuten Golden Eagles

Hiroshima Toyo Carp – No. 90
- Infielder / Coach
- Born: June 7, 1993 (age 33)
- Batted: Right Threw: Right

NPB debut
- July 14, 2013, for the Tohoku Rakuten Golden Eagles

Last NPB appearance
- August 25, 2022, for the Hiroshima Toyo Carp

NPB statistics
- Batting average: .188
- Home runs: 6
- RBI: 28
- Stats at Baseball Reference

Teams
- As player: Tohoku Rakuten Golden Eagles (2012–2019); Hiroshima Toyo Carp (2019–2023); As coach: Hiroshima Toyo Carp (2024–present)

Takumi Miyoshi (三好 匠, Miyoshi Takumi; born June 7, 1993 in Kitakyushu, Fukuoka, Japan) is a Japanese former professional baseball infielder for the Hiroshima Toyo Carp in Japan's Nippon Professional Baseball.
