= Shota Takekuma =

Japanese baseball player (born 1989)

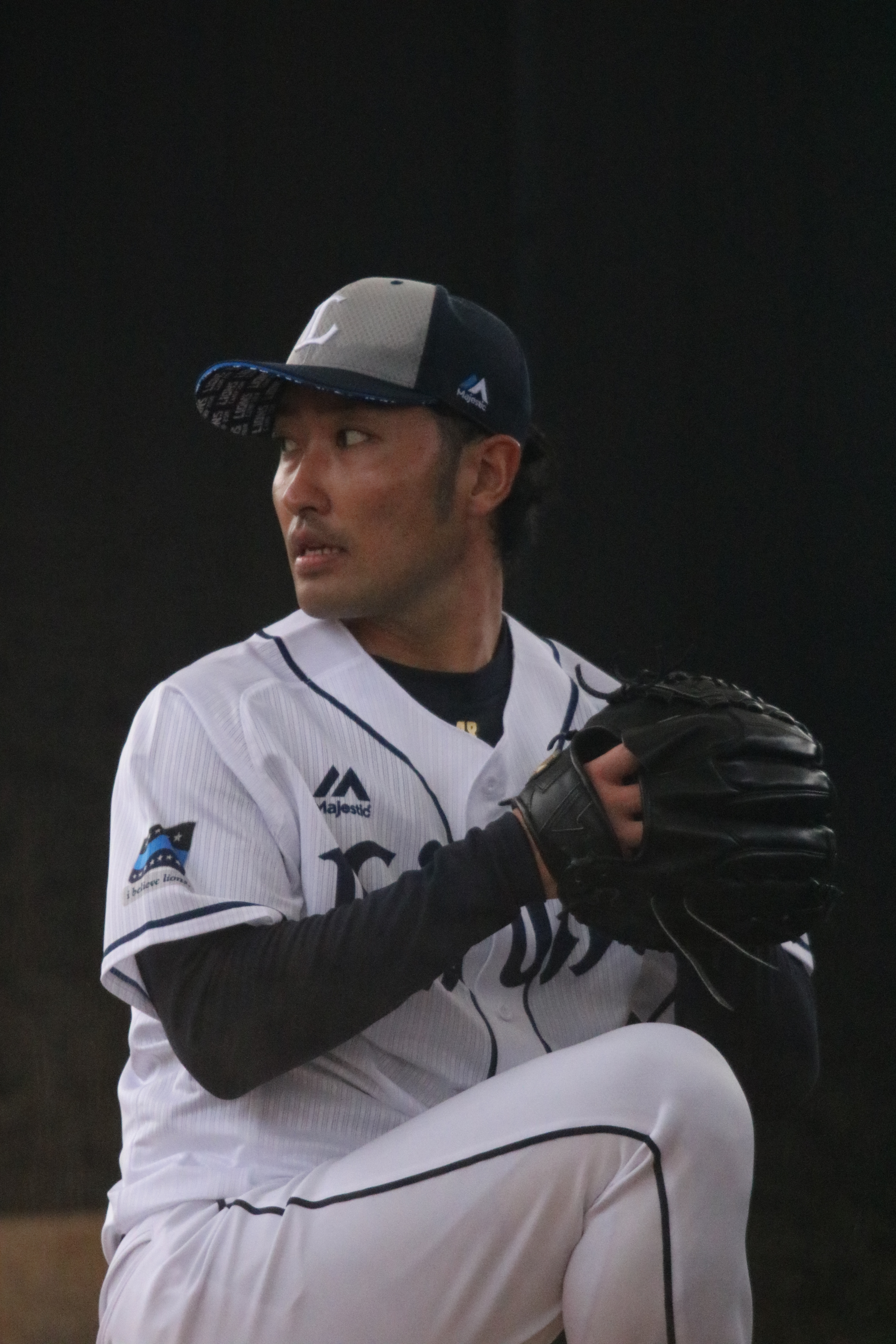
- Pitcher
- Born: November 24, 1989 (age 36); Higashikagura, Hokkaido, Japan
- Batted: Left Threw: Left

NPB debut
- October 7, 2009, for the Saitama Seibu Lions

Last NPB appearance
- October 26, 2021, for the Saitama Seibu Lions

NPB statistics
- Win–loss record: 21-15
- Earned run average: 3.82
- Strikeouts: 254
- Stats at Baseball Reference

Teams
- Saitama Seibu Lions (2008–2022)

Shota Takekuma (武隈 祥太, Takekuma Shota; born November 24, 1989) is a Japanese former professional baseball pitcher. He played in Nippon Professional Baseball (NPB) for the Saitama Seibu Lions from 2009 to 2021.
