= Shintaro Masuda =

Japanese baseball player

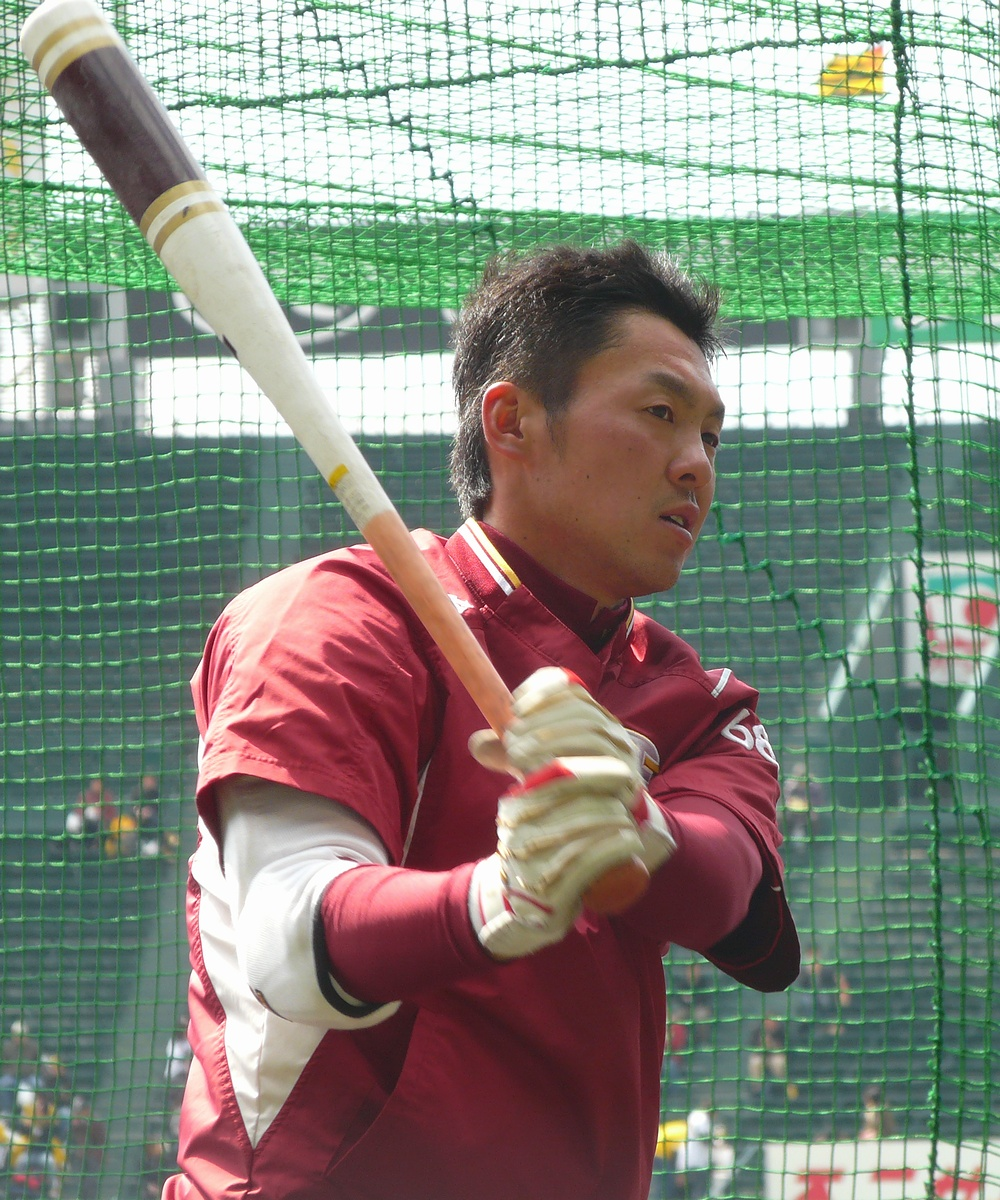
- Masuda with the Tohoku Rakuten Golden Eagles
- Infielder / Outfielder
- Born: July 8, 1987 (age 38)
- Bats: Left Throws: Right

NPB debut
- October 13, 2007, for the Tohoku Rakuten Golden Eagles

NPB statistics (through 2016 season)
- Batting average: .256
- Home runs: 21
- RBI: 130
- Stats at Baseball Reference

Teams
- Tohoku Rakuten Golden Eagles (2006–2018)

Career highlights and awards
- 1× Japan Series champion (2013)

Shintaro Masuda (枡田 慎太郎, born July 8, 1987, in Kyoto, Kyoto) is a Japanese professional baseball infielder for the Tohoku Rakuten Golden Eagles in Japan's Nippon Professional Baseball.
