= Toshiya Okada =

Japanese baseball player (born 1991)

Toshiya Okada 岡田 俊哉
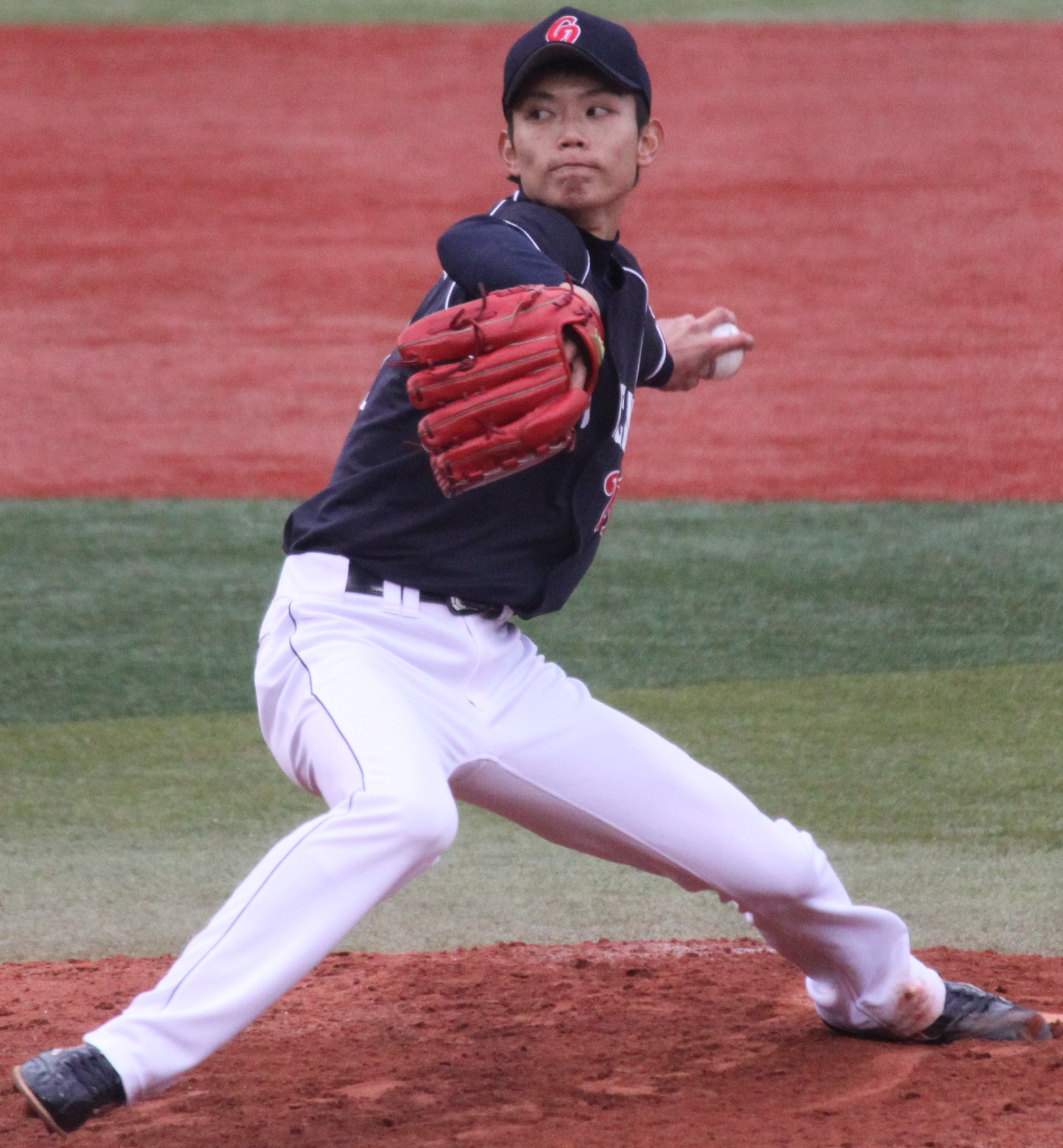
- Okada with the Chunichi Dragons
- Pitcher
- Born: December 5, 1991 (age 34); Hidaka District, Wakayama, Japan
- Batted: Left Threw: Left

debut
- March 30, 2013, for the Chunichi Dragons

Last appearance
- September 20, 2025, for the Chunichi Dragons

Career statistics
- Win–loss: 19-24
- ERA: 3.60
- Hold points: 62
- Strikeouts: 366
- Saves: 19
- Stats at Baseball Reference

Teams
- Chunichi Dragons (2013–2025)
Medals
Men's baseball
Representing Japan
World Baseball Classic
Bronze medal – third place	2017 Los Angeles	Team

Toshiya Okada (岡田 俊哉, Okada Toshiya; born December 5, 1991 in Hidaka District, Wakayama, Japan) is a professional Japanese baseball player. He plays pitcher for the Chunichi Dragons.
