= Sho Miyagawa =

Japanese baseball player

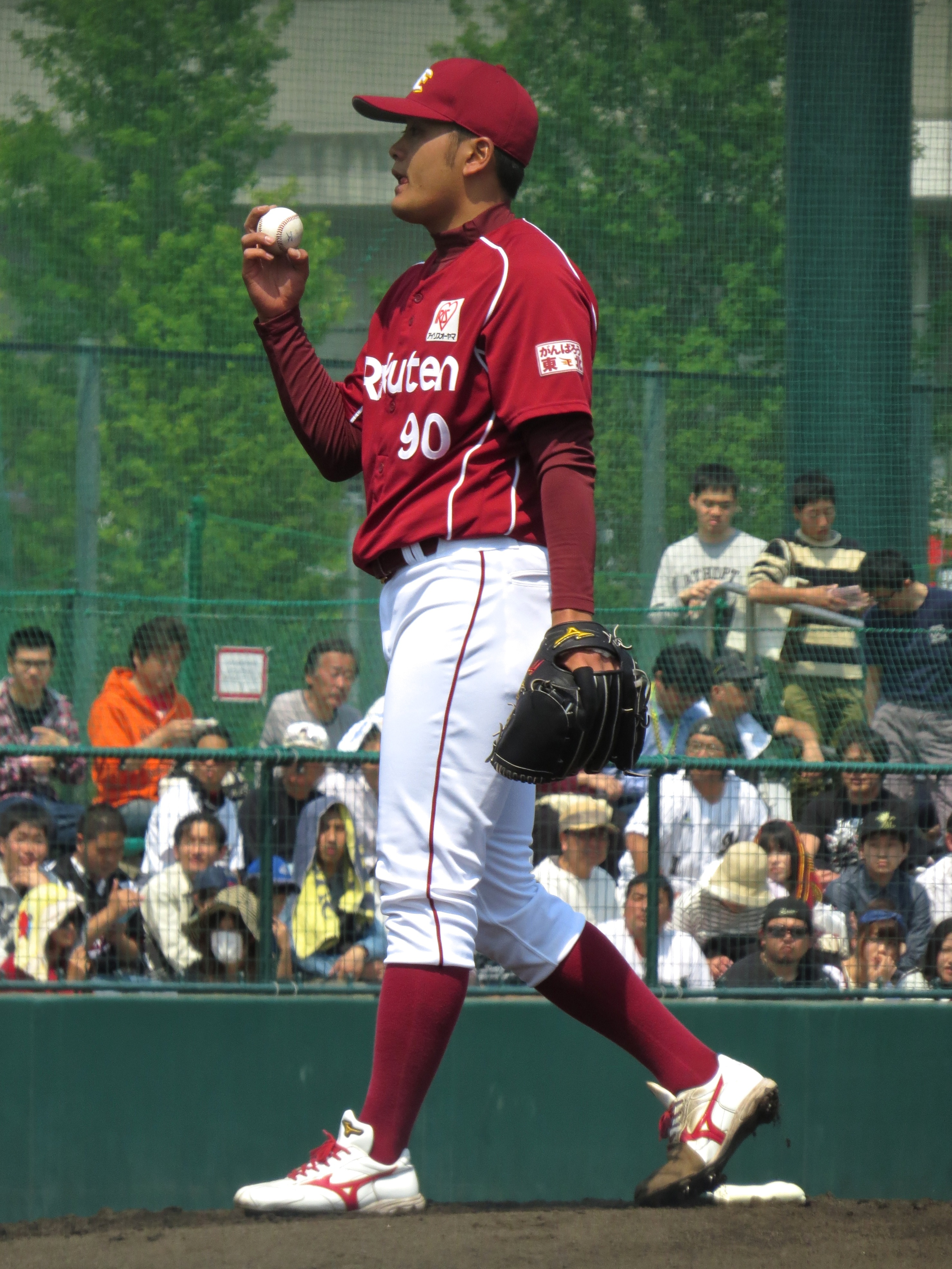
- Miyagawa with the Tohoku Rakuten Golden Eagles
- Pitcher
- Born: October 19, 1990 (age 35)
- Batted: Right Threw: Right

NPB debut
- June 5, 2013, for the Tohoku Rakuten Golden Eagles

Last NPB appearance
- August 13, 2016, for the Tohoku Rakuten Golden Eagles

Career statistics
- Win–loss record: 5-1
- Earned Run Average: 3.13
- Strikeouts: 74
- Saves: 0
- Holds: 1

Teams
- Tohoku Rakuten Golden Eagles (2013–2018); Saitama Musashi Heat Bears (2019–2020)

Career highlights and awards
- 1× Japan Series champion (2013)

Sho Miyagawa (宮川 将, born October 19, 1990, in Sennan, Osaka) is a Japanese professional baseball pitcher for the Tohoku Rakuten Golden Eagles in Japan's Nippon Professional Baseball.
