= Aoi Enomoto =

Japanese baseball player (born 1992)

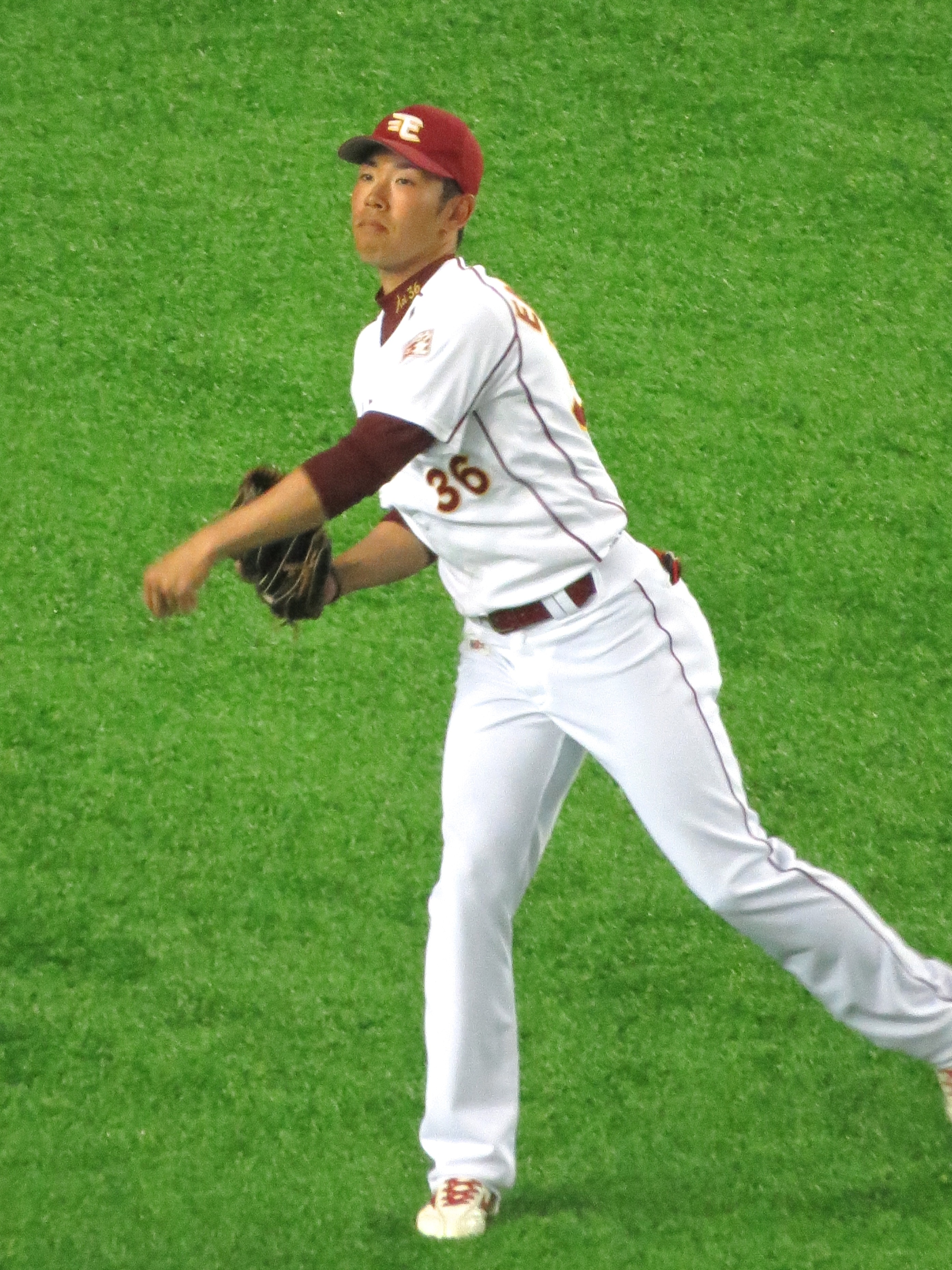
- Enomoto with the Tohoku Rakuten Golden Eagles
- Outfielder
- Born: July 24, 1992 (age 33)
- Bats: Left Throws: Left

NPB debut
- 2011, for the Tohoku Rakuten Golden Eagles

NPB statistics (through 2015)
- Batting average: .116
- Home runs: 0
- RBI: 2
- Stats at Baseball Reference

Teams
- Tohoku Rakuten Golden Eagles (2012–2015); Tokyo Yakult Swallows (2017)

Career highlights and awards
- Japan Series champion (2013)

Aoi Enomoto (榎本 葵, born July 24, 1992) is a Japanese professional baseball outfielder. He played in Japan's Nippon Professional Baseball for the Tohoku Rakuten Golden Eagles from 2012 to 2015 and the Tokyo Yakult Swallows in 2017. Enomoto then played for the Toyama GRN Thunderbirds in the BC League in 2018 and 2019.
