= Yusuke Kosai =

Japanese baseball player (born 1983)

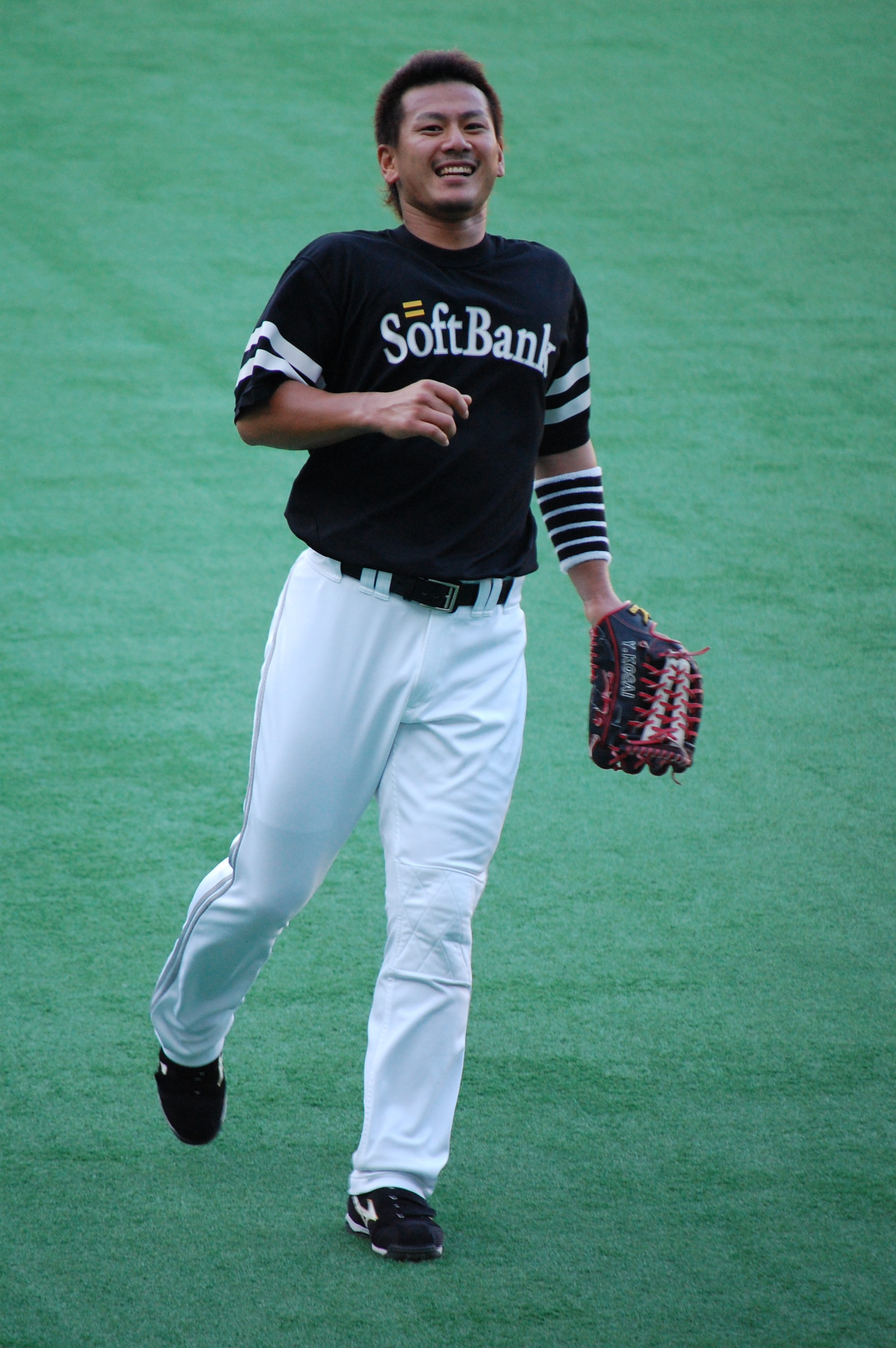
- Kosai with the Fukuoka SoftBank Hawks
- Outfielder
- Born: April 30, 1983 (age 43)
- Bats: Left Throws: Right

NPB debut
- June 3, 2006, for the Fukuoka SoftBank Hawks

NPB statistics (through 2015 season)
- Batting average: .209
- Home runs: 7
- RBI: 32
- Stats at Baseball Reference

Teams
- Fukuoka SoftBank Hawks (2006–2011); Tohoku Rakuten Golden Eagles (2012–2015)

Career highlights and awards
- Japan Series champion (2013)

Yusuke Kosai (小斉 祐輔, born April 30, 1983, in Matsubara, Osaka) is a Japanese professional baseball infielder for the Tohoku Rakuten Golden Eagles in Japan's Nippon Professional Baseball.
