= Ryo Hijirisawa =

Japanese baseball player

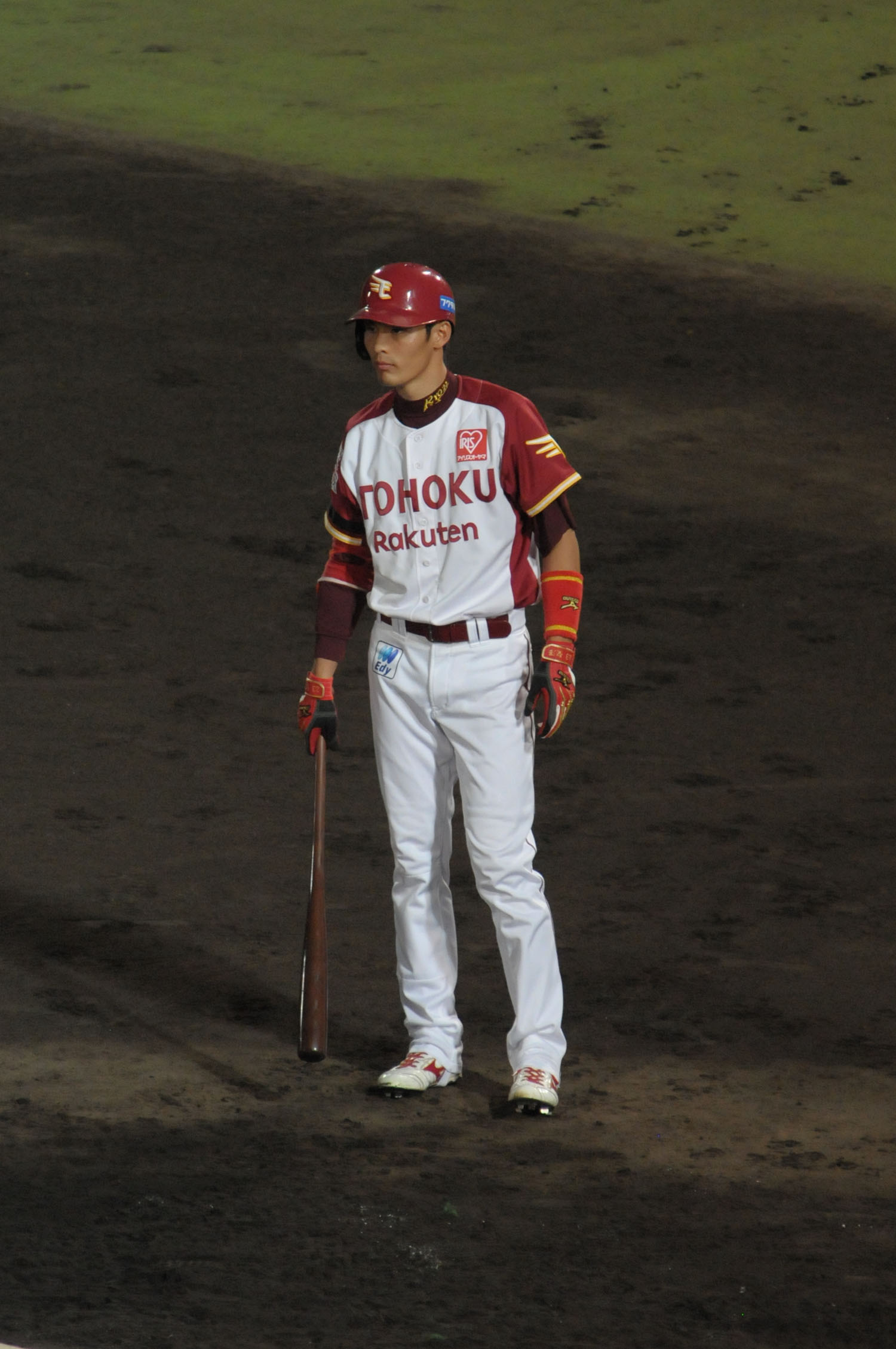
- Hijirisawa with the Tohoku Rakuten Golden Eagles
- Outfielder
- Born: November 3, 1985 (age 40)
- Bats: Left Throws: Right

NPB debut
- March 20, 2008, for the Tohoku Rakuten Golden Eagles

NPB statistics (through 2016 season)
- Batting average: .278
- Home runs: 18
- RBI: 226
- Stats at Baseball Reference

Teams
- Tohoku Rakuten Golden Eagles (2008–2018)

Career highlights and awards
- 2012 Pacific League stolen base champion; Japan Series champion (2013); NPB All-Star (2012)

Ryo Hijirisawa (聖澤 諒, born November 3, 1985, in Chikuma, Nagano) is a Japanese professional baseball outfielder for the Tohoku Rakuten Golden Eagles in Japan's Nippon Professional Baseball.
