= Yasunori Kikuchi =

Japanese baseball player

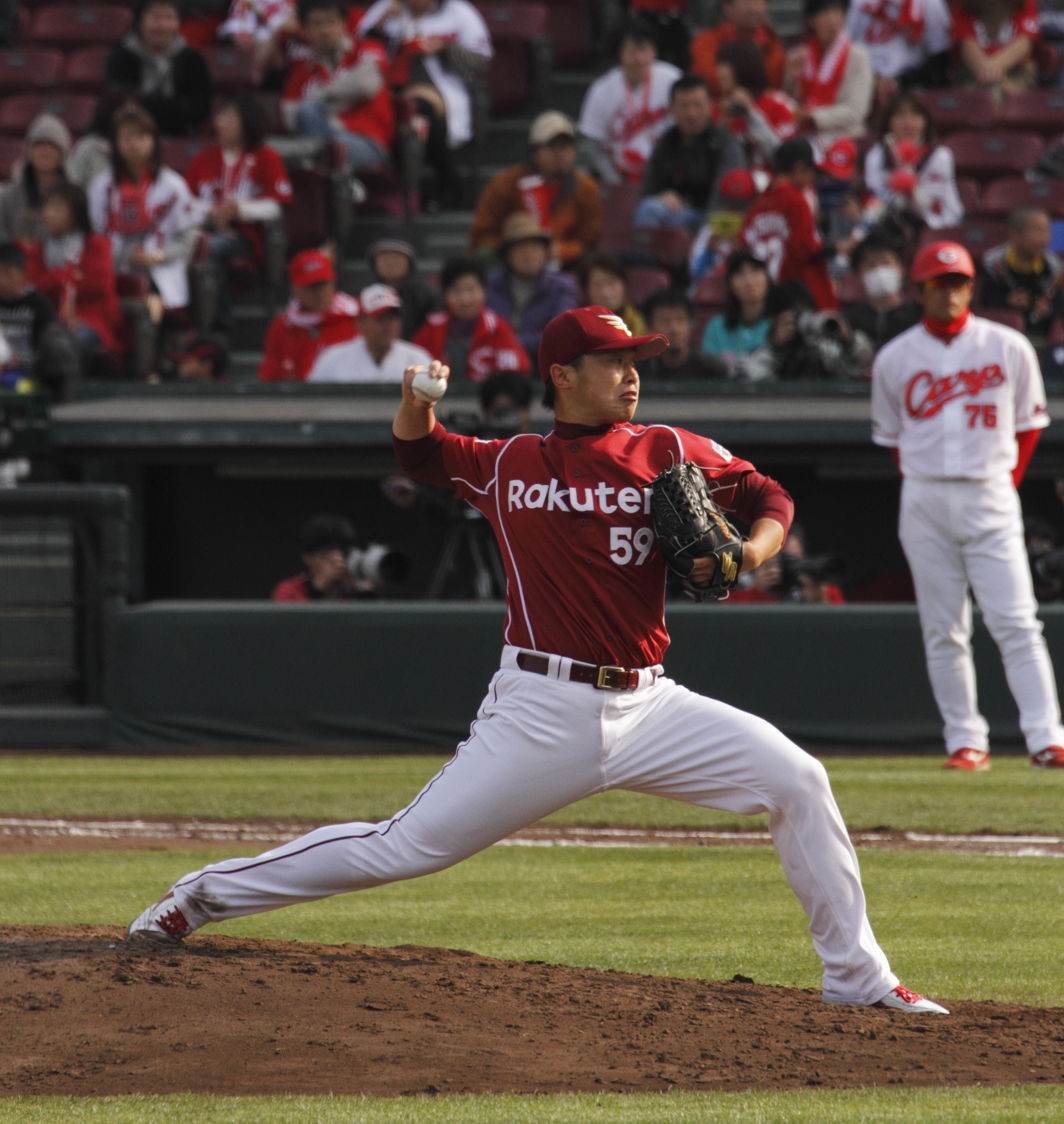
- Kikuchi with the Tohoku Rakuten Golden Eagles
- Pitcher
- Born: September 18, 1989 (age 36)
- Batted: Left Threw: Right

NPB debut
- September 23, 2010, for the Tohoku Rakuten Golden Eagles

Last appearance
- June 29, 2022, for the Hiroshima Toyo Carp

NPB statistics (through April 6, 2022)
- Win-loss record: 16-19
- ERA: 3.83
- Strikeouts: 327

Teams
- Tohoku Rakuten Golden Eagles (2008–2018); Hiroshima Toyo Carp (2019–2022)

Yasunori Kikuchi (菊池 保則, born September 18, 1989, in Kuji District, Ibaraki) is a Japanese professional baseball pitcher for the Hiroshima Toyo Carp in Japan's Nippon Professional Baseball.
