= Takuya Furuya =

Japanese baseball player

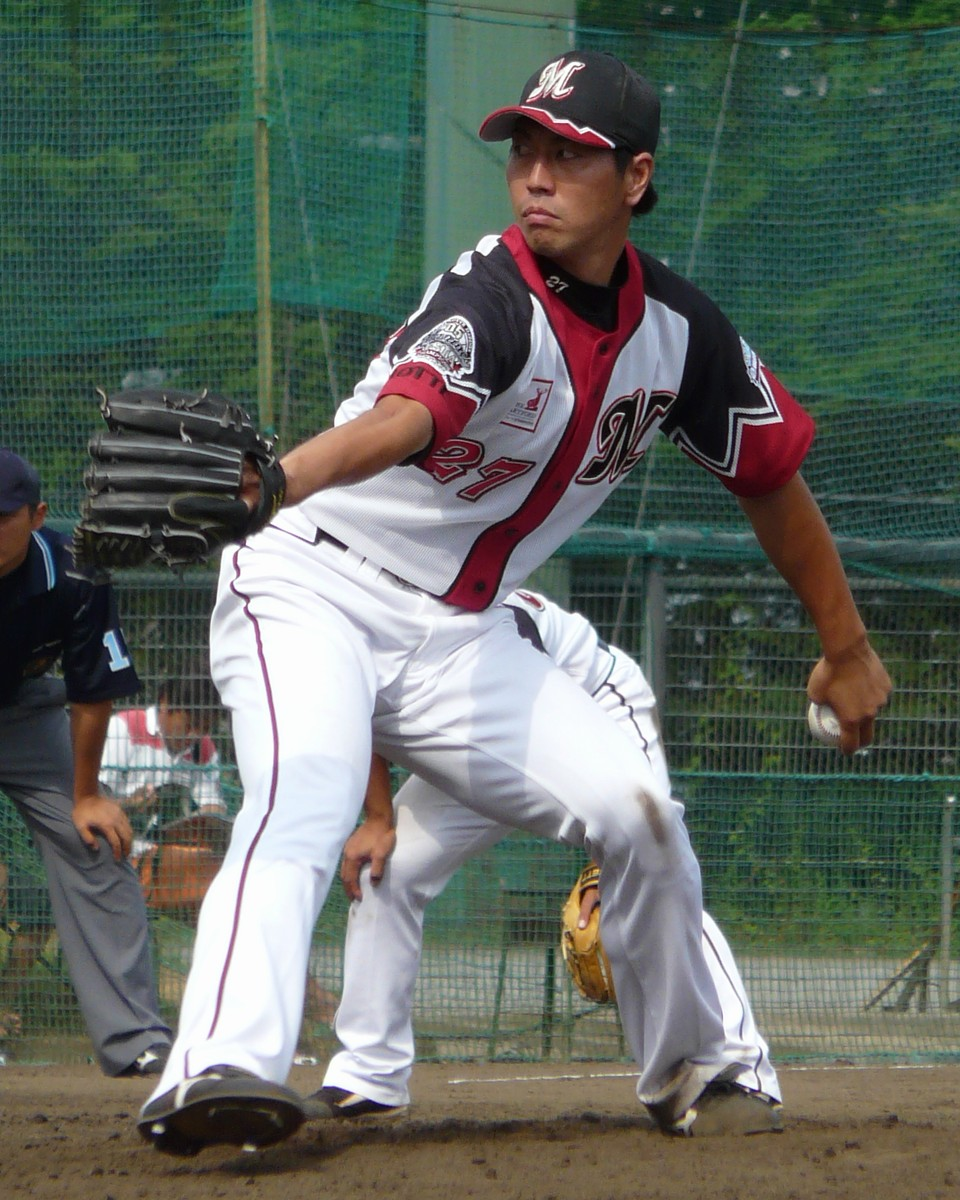
- Furuya with the Chiba Lotte Marines
- Pitcher
- Born: September 10, 1982 (age 43)
- Bats: Left Throws: Left

NPB debut
- 2006, for the Chiba Lotte Marines

NPB statistics (through 2016)
- Win–loss record: 23–15
- ERA: 4.23
- Strikeouts: 261
- Stats at Baseball Reference

Teams
- Chiba Lotte Marines (2006, 2009–2016)

Takuya Furuya (古谷 拓哉, born July 14, 1981, in Kitami, Hokkaidō) is a Japanese former professional baseball pitcher in Japan's Nippon Professional Baseball. He played for the Chiba Lotte Marines in 2006 and from 2009 to 2016.
