= Tomohisa Otani =

Japanese baseball player (born 1985)

Tomohisa Ōtani
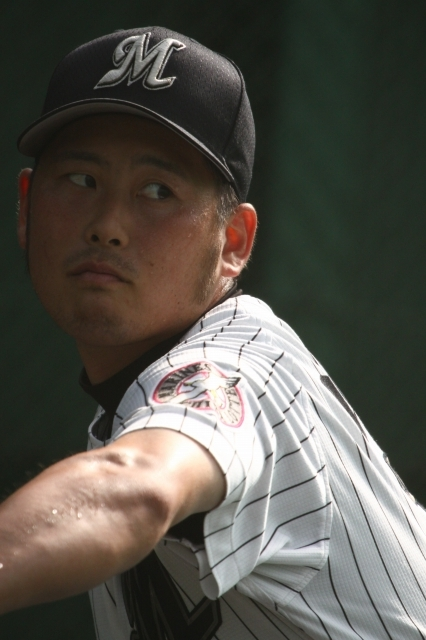
- Ōtani with the Chiba Lotte Marines

Chiba Lotte Marines – No. 85
- Pitcher / Coach
- Born: February 14, 1985 (age 41); Hyōgo Prefecture, Japan
- Batted: Right Threw: Right

NPB debut
- April 23, 2010, for the Chiba Lotte Marines

Last NPB appearance
- September 20, 2019, for the Chiba Lotte Marines

NPB statistics
- Win–loss record: 20–34
- ERA: 3.67
- Strikeouts: 332
- Stats at Baseball Reference

Teams
- Chiba Lotte Marines (2010–2020)

Tomohisa Ōtani (大谷 智久, born February 14, 1985, in Hyōgo Prefecture) is a Japanese former professional baseball pitcher who is currently a coach for the Chiba Lotte Marines of Nippon Professional Baseball (NPB). He played in NPB for the Marines from 2010 to 2020.

== Career ==
Chiba Lotte Marines selected Otani with the second selection in the 2009 NPB draft.

On April 23, 2010, Otani made his NPB debut.

On December 2, 2020, Otani became a free agent. On December 14, he announced his retirement and become a coach for the Marines.
