= Hiroshi Katayama (baseball) =

Japanese baseball player

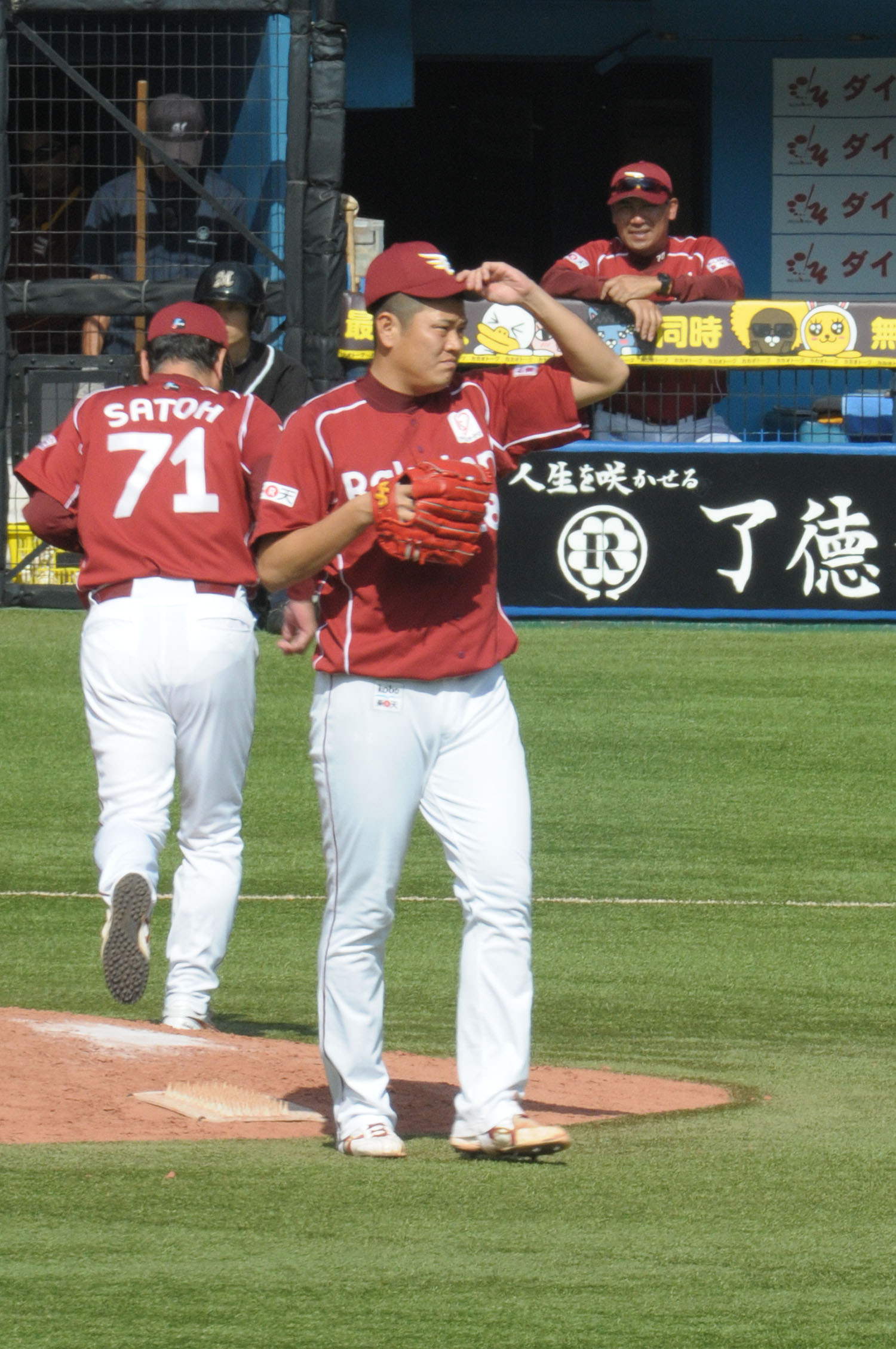
- Katayama with the Tohoku Rakuten Golden Eagles
- Pitcher
- Born: April 19, 1987 (age 38)
- Bats: Left Throws: Left

NPB debut
- June 3, 2008, for the Tohoku Rakuten Golden Eagles

Teams
- As player: Tohoku Rakuten Golden Eagles (2006–2017); Musashi Heat Bears/Saitama Musashi Heat Bears (2018–); As coach: Musashi Heat Bears/Saitama Musashi Heat Bears (2018–)

Career highlights and awards
- 1× Japan Series champion (2013)

Hiroshi Katayama (片山 博視, born April 19, 1987) is a Japanese professional baseball pitcher for the Tohoku Rakuten Golden Eagles in Japan's Nippon Professional Baseball.
