= Toshihito Abe =

Japanese baseball player (born 1988)

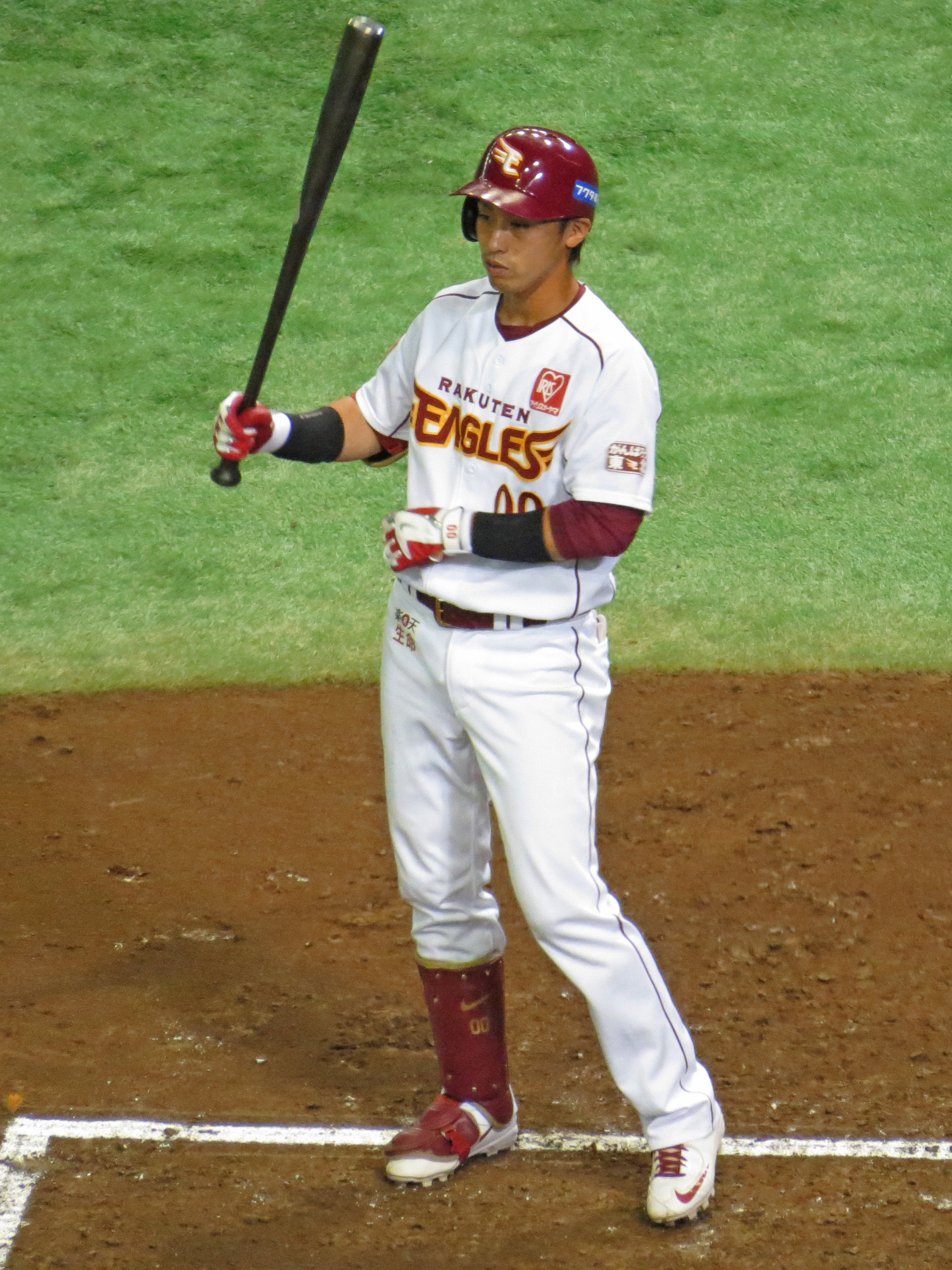
- Abe with the Tohoku Rakuten Golden Eagles
- Infielder
- Born: December 23, 1988 (age 36)
- Bats: Left Throws: Right

NPB debut
- 2011, for the Tohoku Rakuten Golden Eagles

NPB statistics (through 2016)
- Batting average: .211
- Home runs: 0
- RBI: 12

Teams
- Tohoku Rakuten Golden Eagles (2011–2017)

Career highlights and awards
- Japan Series champion (2013)

Toshihito Abe (阿部 俊人, Abe Toshihito; born December 23, 1988 in Sendai, Miyagi Prefecture) is a Japanese professional baseball infielder for the Tohoku Rakuten Golden Eagles in Japan's Nippon Professional Baseball.
