= 2011 Nippon Professional Baseball draft =

2011 Nippon Professional Baseball Draft
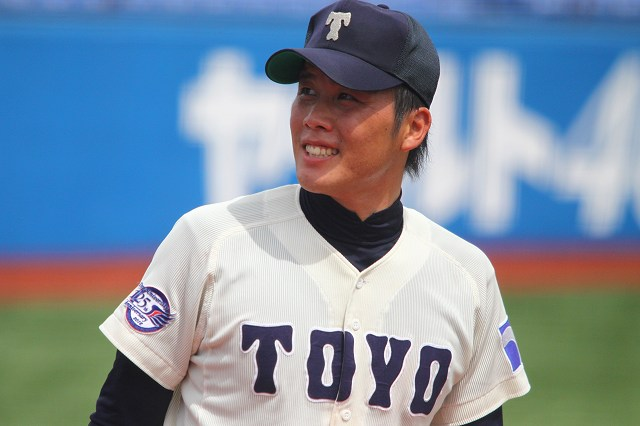
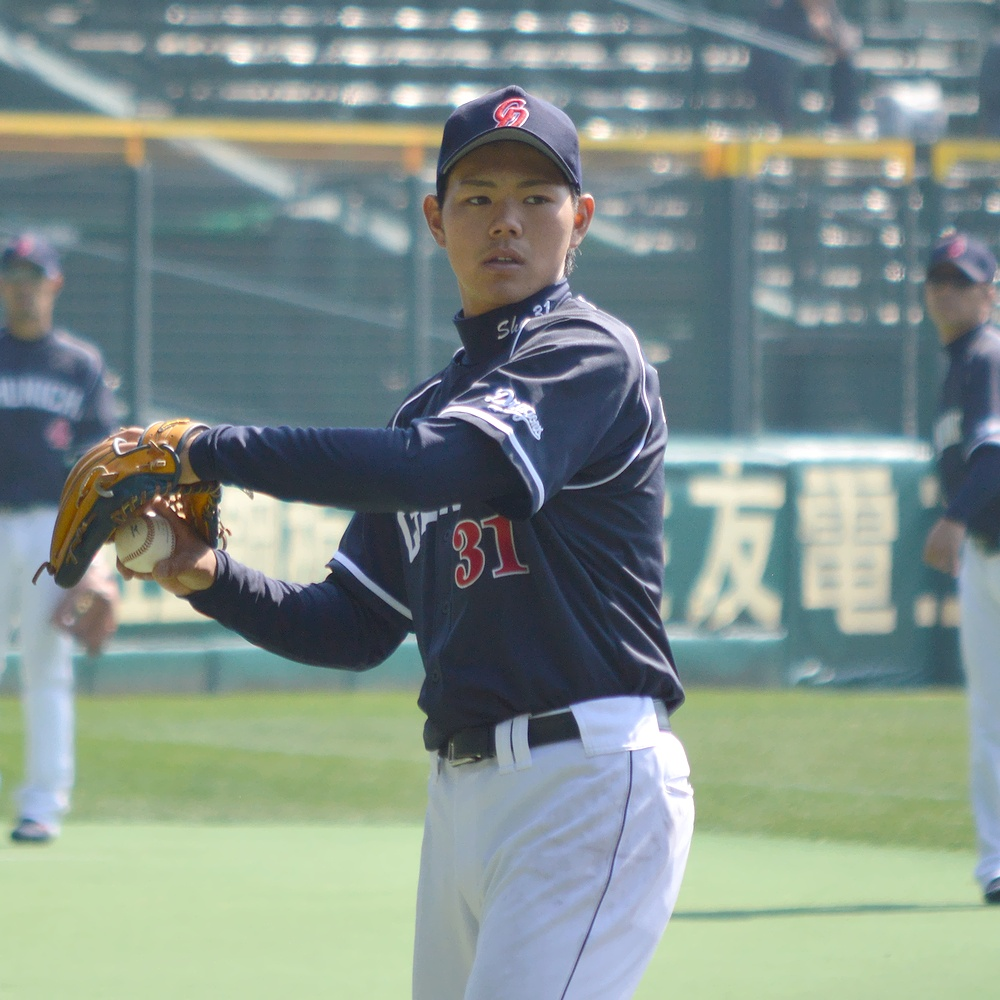
- Takahiro Fujioka and Shuhei Takahashi, who were each given nomination a bids lottery by three teams.

General information
- Sport: Baseball
- Date: October 27, 2011
- Location: Grand Prince Hotel Takanawa, Tokyo
- Networks: TBS (first round), sky-A
- Sponsored by: Toshiba

Overview
- 98 total selections in 16 (Includes draft for developmental players) rounds
- League: Nippon Professional Baseball
- First round selections: Takahiro Fujioka; Shuhei Takahashi; Tomoyuki Sugano

The 2011 Nippon Professional Baseball (NPB) Draft was held on October 27, 2011, for the 47th time at the Grand Prince Hotel Takanawa to assign amateur baseball players to the NPB. It was arranged with the special cooperation of Toshiba with official naming rights. The draft was officially called "The Professional Baseball Draft Meeting supported by TOSHIBA." It has been sponsored by Toshiba for the 3rd consecutive year since 2009.

== Summary ==
Only the first round picks will be done by bid lottery. After the second round, waver selections were made in order from the lowest-ranked team of the 2011 season in both the Central League and Pacific League, the third round was reversed and selections were made from the top team, and the fourth round was reversed again, alternating with selections from the lowest-ranked team until all teams had finished selecting players.

Since the 2005 season, the winner of the NPB All-Star Game has determined whether the Central League or the Pacific League gets waiver preference after the second round. In the 2011 All-Star Game, the Pacific League won two games, so the Pacific League was given waiver priority over the Central League.

The Yomiuri Giants publicly announced that they would pick Tomoyuki Sugano, the nephew of the Giants' manager Tatsunori Hara, in the first round, which caused other teams to shun him, and Sugano was expected to be the Giants' lone pick. However, the Hokkaido Nippon-Ham Fighters pushed for the nomination, and as a result of a lottery bidding with the Giants, the Fighters won the right to negotiate. Sugano did not agree to negotiations with the Fighters and did not join the team. When the fighters won the lots, the audience cheered and applauded. The reason for this was the backlash from the fans after the Giants publicly announced the players they wanted to pick in the first round and used it as a way to deter other teams, picking Hisayoshi Chono in 2009 and Hirokazu Sawamura in 2010 by themselves. The Sugano pick sparked a debate about the significance of the draft system.

== First Round Contested Picks ==
	Player name	Position	Teams selected by
First Round	**Takahiro Fujioka**	Pitcher	**Marines**, Baystars, Eagles
First Round	**Shuhei Takahashi**	Infielder	Buffaloes, Swallows, **Dragons**
First Round	**Tomoyuki Sugano**	Pitcher	**Fighters**, Giants
Second Round	**Ryuya Matsumoto**	Pitcher	Baystars, **Giants**

- **Bolded** teams indicate who won the right to negotiate contract following a lottery.
- In the first round, **Yusuke Nomura** (Pitcher) was selected by the **Carp**, **Hayata Ito** (Outfielder) by the **Tigers**, **Ken Togame** (Pitcher) by the **Lions**, and **Shota Takeda** (Pitcher) by the **Hawks** without a bid lottery.
- In the second round, **Yoshitaka Muto** (Pitcher) was selected by the **Eagles**, **Ryoichi Adachi** (Infielder) by the **Buffaloes**, and **Ryuhei Kawakami** (Outfielder) by the **Swallows** without a bid lottery.
- In the thrird round, the last remaining **Baystars** selected **Yujoh Kitagata** (Pitcher).
- List of selected players.

== Selected Players ==
Key
*	Player did not sign

- The order of the teams is the order of second round waiver priority.
- **Bolded** After that, a developmental player who contracted as a registered player under control.
- List of selected players.

=== Chiba Lotte Marines ===
Pick	Player name	Position	Team
#1	Takahiro Fujioka	Pitcher	Toyo University
#2	Yuhei Nakaushiro	Pitcher	Kindai University
#3	Daichi Suzuki	Infielder	Toyo University
#4	Naoya Masuda	Pitcher	Kansai University of International Studies

=== Yokohama Baystars ===
Pick	Player name	Position	Team
#1	Yujoh Kitagata	Pitcher	Karatsu Commercial High School
#2	Shuto Takajo	Catcher	Kyushu International University High School
#3	Yuki Watanabe	Infielder	Kanzei High School
#4	Masayuki Kuwahara	Infielder	Fukuchiyama Seibi High School
#5	Tomo Otosaka	Outfielder	Yokohama High School
#6	Mikihisa Travis Samura	Pitcher	Urasoe commercial high school
#7	Hyuma Matsui	Infielder	Mitsubishi Heavy Industries Hiroshima
#8	Toru Komura	Pitcher	Chigasaki Nishihama High School
#9	Takuro Ito	Pitcher	Teikyo High School
Developmental Player Draft
#1	**Kosuke Tomita**	Pitcher	Kagawa Olive Guyners
#2	**Masashi Nishimori**	Catcher	Kagawa Olive Guyners

=== Tohoku Rakuten Golden Eagles ===
Pick	Player name	Position	Team
#1	Yoshitaka Muto	Pitcher	JR-Hokkaido
#2	Yoshinao Kamata	Pitcher	Kanazawa High School
#3	Takumi Miyoshi	Pitcher	Kyushu International University High School
#4	Takero Okajima	Catcher	Hakuoh University
#5	Rintaro Kitagawa	Outfielder	Meitoku Gijuku High School
#6	Hiroaki Shimauchi	Outfielder	Meiji University
Developmental Player Draft
#1	Takahiro Jimbo	Outfielder	TRANSYS

=== Hiroshima Toyo Carp ===
Pick	Player name	Position	Team
#1	Yusuke Nomura	Pitcher	Meiji University
#2	Ryosuke Kikuchi	Infielder	Chukyo Gakuin University
#3	Takaya Toda	Pitcher	Shonan High School
#4	Shohei Habu	Outfielder	Waseda University
Developmental Player Draft
#1	Hajime Tominaga	Pitcher	Tokushima Indigo Socks
#2	Masataka Nakamura	Outfielder	Kagawa Olive Guyners
#3	Kohei Tsukada	Pitcher	Waseda University
#4	**Kazuma Mike**	Outfielder	Shirithu Wakayama High School

=== Orix Buffaloes ===
Pick	Player name	Position	Team
#1	Ryoichi Adachi	Infielder	Toshiba
#2	Takuya Shimada	Infielder	JR-East
#3	Tatsuya Satoh	Pitcher	Honda
#4	Tomoyuki Kaida	Pitcher	Nippon Life
#5	Ryuji Shoji	Catcher	j-Project
#6	Yuki Tsutsumi	Infielder	Ryukoku High School
#7	Shuhei Kojima	Infielder	Sumitomo Metal Industries Kashima
#8	Takayoshi Kawabata	Outfielder	JR-East
Developmental Player Draft
#1	Daiki Inakura	Outfielder	Kumamoto Kokufu High School
#2	Shoki Kakihara	Infielder	Chinzei High School

=== Hanshin Tigers ===
Pick	Player name	Position	Team
#1	Hayata Ito	Outfielder	Keio University
#2	Hiroaki Saiuchi	Pitcher	Seiko High School
#3	Naoto Nishida	Infielder	Osaka Toin High School
#4	Kazuo Ito	Pitcher	Tokyo International University
#5	Ryoma Matsuda	Pitcher	Hasami high school
Developmental Player Draft
#1	Seiya Hirokami	Catcher	Gunma Diamond Pegasus

=== Saitama Seibu Lions ===
Pick	Player name	Position	Team
#1	Ken Togame	Pitcher	JR-East
#2	Hirotaka Koishi	Pitcher	NTT East Japan
#3	Hitoto Komazuki	Catcher	Tonan High School
#4	Kyohei Nagae	Infielder	Kaisei High School
#5	Shotaro Tashiro	Outfielder	Hachinohe Gakuin University
Developmental Player Draft
#1	**Komei Fujisawa**	Catcher	Matsumoto University

=== Yomiuri Giants ===
Pick	Player name	Position	Team
#1	Ryuya Matsumoto	Pitcher	Eimei High School
#2	Nobutaka Imamura	Pitcher	Taisei Gakuin University High School
#3	Ryuji Ichioka	Pitcher	Oki Data Computer Education Academy
#4	Kyosuke Takagi	Pitcher	Kokugakuin University
#5	Ko Takahashi	Outfielder	Nihon Bunri High School
#6	Yuki Egarashi	Pitcher	Toshiba
#7	Seiji Tahara	Pitcher	Mitsubishi Motors Kurashiki Oceans
Developmental Player Draft
#1	Kazuki Mori	Pitcher	Ichiritsu Kashiwa High School
#2	**Mizuki Tsuchida**	Pitcher	Ehime Mandarin Pirates
#3	Shogo Shibata	Pitcher	Meiji University
#4	Chikara Yoshikawa	Catcher	Rakuhoku High School
#5	Takashi Amemiya	Pitcher	Niigata Albirex BC
#6	Takahiro Watanabe	Pitcher	Niigata Albirex BC

=== Hokkaido Nippon-Ham Fighters ===
Pick	Player name	Position	Team
#1	Tomoyuki Sugano	Pitcher	Tokai University
#2	Go Matsumoto	Intfielder	Teikyo High School
#3	Shingo Ishikawa	Outfielder	Higashiosaka College Kashiwara High School
#4	Kensuke Kondo	Catcher	Yokohama High School
#5	Toshiharu Moriuchi	Pitcher	JR-East Tohoku
#6	Naoyuki Uwasawa	Pitcher	Senshu University Matsudo High School
#7	Takumi Oshima	Catcher	Waseda University Softball Club

=== Tokyo Yakult Swallows ===
Pick	Player name	Position	Team
#1	Ryuhei Kawakami	Outfielder	Kosei Gakuin High School
#2	Ryohei Kiya	Pitcher	Nippon Bunri University
#3	Wataru Hiyane	Outfielder	Nippon Paper Industries Ishinomaki
#4	Yuya Ota	Pitcher	Nippon Paper Industries Ishinomaki
#5	Yuji Nakane	Pitcher	Tohoku Fukushi University
#6	Masato Furuno	Pitcher	Mitsubishi Heavy Industries Kobe
Developmental Player Draft
#1	**Takeaki Tokuyama**	Pitcher	Ritsumeikan University
#2	**Hugo Kanabushi**	Pitcher	Hakuoh University

=== Fukuoka SoftBank Hawks ===
Pick	Player name	Position	Team
#1	Shota Takeda	Pitcher	Miyazaki Nihon University High School
#2	Shoji Yoshimoto	Pitcher	Adachi Gakuen High School
#3	Masayoshi Tsukada	Infielder	Hakuoh University
#4	Naoki Shirane	Infielder	Kaisei High School
#5	Shinya Kayama	Pitcher	JX-Eneos
Developmental Player Draft
#1	**Go Kamamoto**	Outfielder	Seiryo High School
#2	**Kyohei Kamezawa**	Infielder	Kagawa Olive Guyners
#3	Shota Miura	Pitcher	Iwate University
#4	Takayuki Shimizu	Pitcher	Gunma Diamond Pegasus
#5	Shinya Aeasaki	Infielder	Nippon Bunri University
#6	Akihiro Sasanuma	Catcher	All Ashikaga Club
#7	Kazuya Iida	Catcher	Kochi Fighting Dogs

=== Chunichi Dragons ===
Pick	Player name	Position	Team
#1	Shuhei Takahashi	Infielder	Tokai University Kofu High School
#2	Kentaro Nishikawa	Pitcher	Seiryo High School
#3	Shinji Tajima	Pitcher	Tokai Gakuen University
#4	Takehiko Tsuji	Pitcher	Nippon Sport Science University
#5	Takahiro Kawasaki	Pitcher	Tsu Higashi High School
#6	Song Sang-Hoon	Pitcher	Fukui High School / Shin shin High School (South Korea)

Preceded by **2010**	**Nippon Professional Baseball draft**	Succeeded by **2012**
