= Hyuma Matsui =

Japanese baseball player (born 1991)

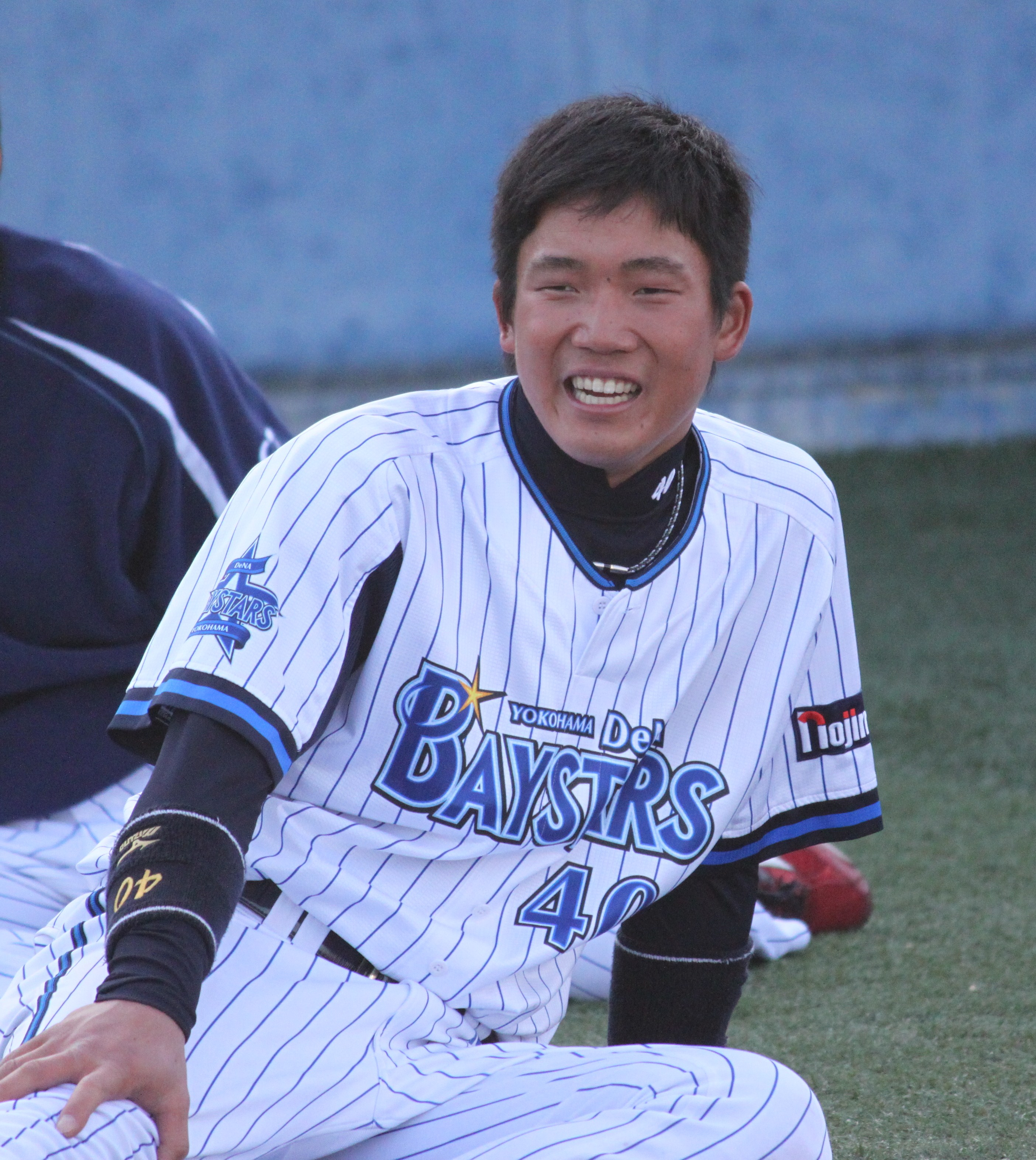
- Hyuma with the Yokohama DeNA BayStars
- Infielder
- Born: March 17, 1991 (age 35); Osaka, Osaka, Japan
- Batted: Right Threw: Right

debut
- April 27, 2014, for the Yokohama DeNA BayStars

Last NPB appearance
- September 8, 2019, for the Yokohama DeNA BayStars

Career statistics
- Batting average: .182
- Home runs: 2
- Runs batted in: 11
- Stats at Baseball Reference

Teams
- Yokohama DeNA BayStars (2012–2020)

Hyuma Matsui (松井 飛雄馬, Matsui Hyuma; born March 17, 1991) is a Japanese former baseball player. He has played in Nippon Professional Baseball (NPB) for the Yokohama DeNA BayStars.

== Career ==
Yokohama BayStars selected Matsui with the seventh selection in the 2011 NPB draft.

On April 27, 2014, Matsui made his NPB debut.

On December 26, 2020, Matsui announced his retirement.
