= Kyohei Nagae =

Japanese baseball player (born 1993)

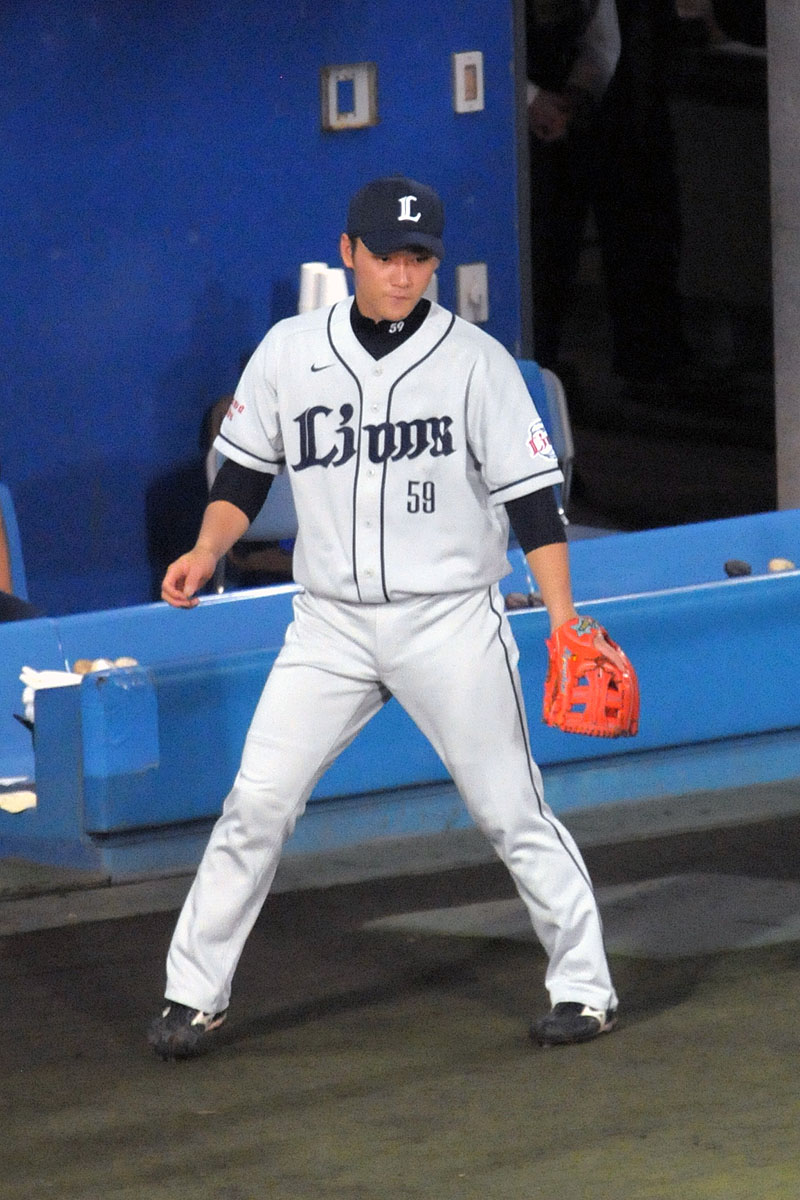
- Nagae with the Saitama Seibu Lions

Free Agent
- Infielder
- Born: May 7, 1993 (age 33); Tosu, Saga, Japan
- Bats: Left Throws: Right

NPB debut
- July 15, 2012, for the Saitama Seibu Lions

NPB statistics (through 2020 season)
- Batting average: .153
- Home runs: 2
- RBI: 18
- Stats at Baseball Reference

Teams
- Saitama Seibu Lions (2012–2020)

Kyohei Nagae (永江 恭平, Nagae Kyōhei; born May 7, 1993) is a Japanese professional baseball infielder who is currently a free agent. He has played in Nippon Professional Baseball (NPB) for the Saitama Seibu Lions.

== Career ==
Saitama Seibu Lions selected Nagase with the forth selection in the 2011 NPB draft.

On July 15, 2012, Nagase made his NPB debut.

On December 2, 2020, he become a free agent.
