= Moriuchi =

Moriuchi (written: 森内 lit. "forest inside") is a Japanese surname. Notable people with the surname include:

- Hiroki Moriuchi (森内 寛樹, born 1994), Japanese singer-songwriter
- Takahiro Moriuchi (森内 貴寛, born 1988), Japanese singer-songwriter and composer
- Takeshi Moriuchi, Japanese conductor
- Toshio Moriuchi (森内 俊雄, 1936–2023), Japanese writer
- Toshiharu Moriuchi (森内 壽春, born 1985), Japanese baseball player
- Toshiyuki Moriuchi (森内 俊之, born 1970), Japanese shogi, chess and backgammon player
