= Yuhei Nakaushiro =

Japanese baseball player (born 1989)

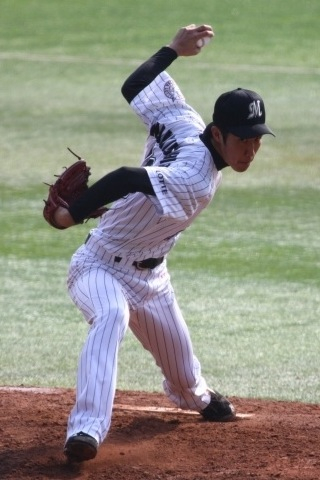
- Nakaushiro with the Chiba Lotte Marines
- Pitcher
- Born: 17 September 1989 (age 36); Kumatori, Osaka, Japan
- Batted: Left Threw: Left

NPB debut
- March 31, 2012, for the Chiba Lotte Marines

Last NPB appearance
- September 7, 2019, for the Yokohama DeNA BayStars

NPB statistics (through 2019 season)
- Win–loss record: 2–2
- ERA: 5.09
- Strikeouts: 21
- Stats at Baseball Reference

Teams
- Chiba Lotte Marines (2012–2015); Yokohama DeNA BayStars (2018–2019)

Yuhei Nakaushiro (中後 悠平, Nakaushiro Yūhei; born 17 September 1989) is a former Japanese professional baseball pitcher. He played for the Chiba Lotte Marines and Yokohama DeNA BayStars.

== Career ==
Chiba Lotte Marines selected him with the second selection in the 2011 NPB draft.

On 1 March 2016, Nakaushiro agreed to a minor league contract with the Arizona Diamondbacks of Major League Baseball. He spent 2016 with the AZL Diamondbacks, Kane County Cougars, Visalia Rawhide and Reno Aces, pitching to a combined 1.23 ERA with 40 strikeouts in 29.1 innings pitched. In 2017, he pitched for the Jackson Generals where he compiled a 1–2 record and 2.35 ERA in 48 relief appearances; he also was promoted and pitched in two games at the end of the season for Reno. Nakaushiro was released from the organization on June 18, 2018. On July 4, 2018, it was announced that Nakaushiro had signed with the Yokohama DeNA BayStars in the Nippon Professional Baseball (NPB).

On November 25, 2019, Nakaushiro announced his retirement.
