= Kyosuke Takagi =

Japanese baseball player

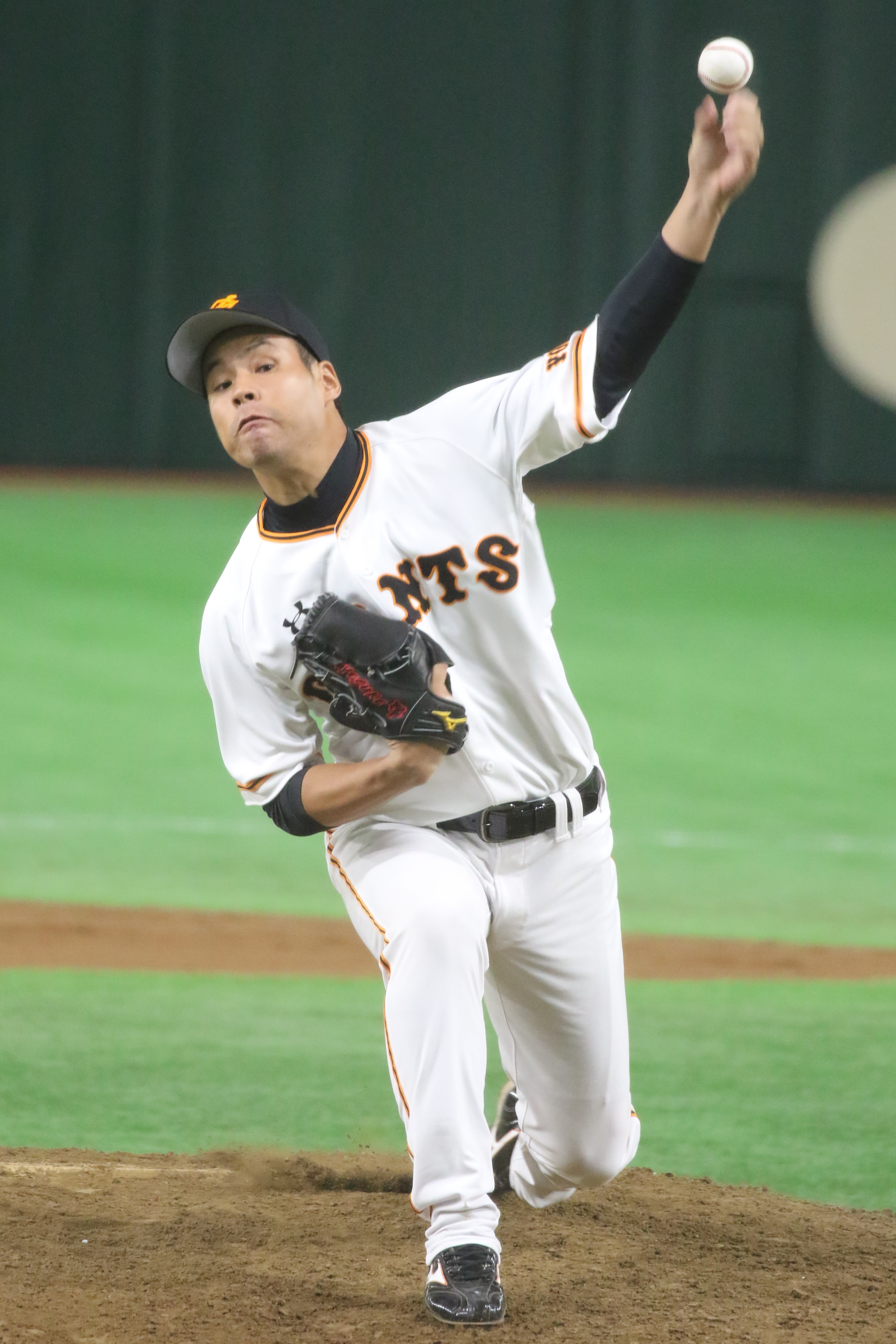
- Takagi with the Yomiuri Giants
- Pitcher
- Born: September 5, 1989 (age 36); Nomi, Ishikawa, Japan
- Bats: Left Throws: Left

debut
- March 31, 2012, for the Yomiuri Giants

NPB statistics (through 2021 season)
- Win–loss record: 10–2
- Earned run average: 3.55
- Strikeouts: 213
- Holds: 36
- Saves: 2
- Stats at Baseball Reference

Teams
- Yomiuri Giants (2012–2015, 2017–2023)

Kyosuke Takagi (高木 京介, Takagi Kyosuke; born September 5, 1989) is a Japanese professional baseball pitcher for the Yomiuri Giants of Nippon Professional Baseball (NPB).

== Career ==
Yomiuri Giants selected Takagi with the forth selection in the 2011 NPB draft.

On March 31, 2012, Takagi made his NPB debut.

On November 16, 2018, he was selected Yomiuri Giants roster at the 2018 MLB Japan All-Star Series exhibition game against MLB All-Stars.

On December 2, 2020, he become a free agent. On December 9, 2020, Takagi re-signed with the Giants.
