= Seiji Tahara =

Japanese baseball player

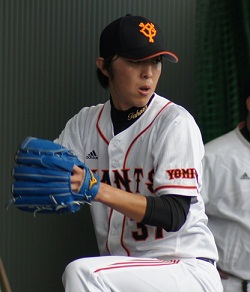
- Tahara with the Yomiuri Giants

Free Agent
- Pitcher
- Born: September 2, 1989 (age 36); Nobeoka, Miyazaki, Japan
- Bats: Left Throws: Right

NPB debut
- June 11, 2012, for the Yomiuri Giants

NPB statistics (through 2020 season)
- Win–loss record: 12–7
- Earned run average: 3.13
- Strikeouts: 138
- Holds: 35
- Saves: 0
- Stats at Baseball Reference

Teams
- Yomiuri Giants (2012–2020)

Seiji Tahara (田原 誠次, Tahara Seiji; born September 2, 1989 in Nobeoka, Miyazaki, Japan) is a Japanese professional baseball pitcher who is currently a free agent. He has played with the Nippon Professional Baseball (NPB) for the Yomiuri Giants.

== Career ==
Yomiuri Giants selected Tahara with the seventh selection in the 2011 NPB draft.

On June 11, 2012, Tahara made his NPB debut.

On December 2, 2020, he become a free agent.
