= Kamamoto =

Kamamoto (written: 釜本 or 釜元) is a Japanese surname. Notable people with the surname include:

- Fumio Kamamoto (釜本 文男; 1918–2011), Japanese hammer thrower
- Go Kamamoto (釜元 豪; born 1993), Japanese baseball player
- Kunishige Kamamoto (釜本 邦茂; 1944–2025), Japanese football player, manager, and politician
