= Takahiro Fujioka =

Japanese baseball player (born 1989)

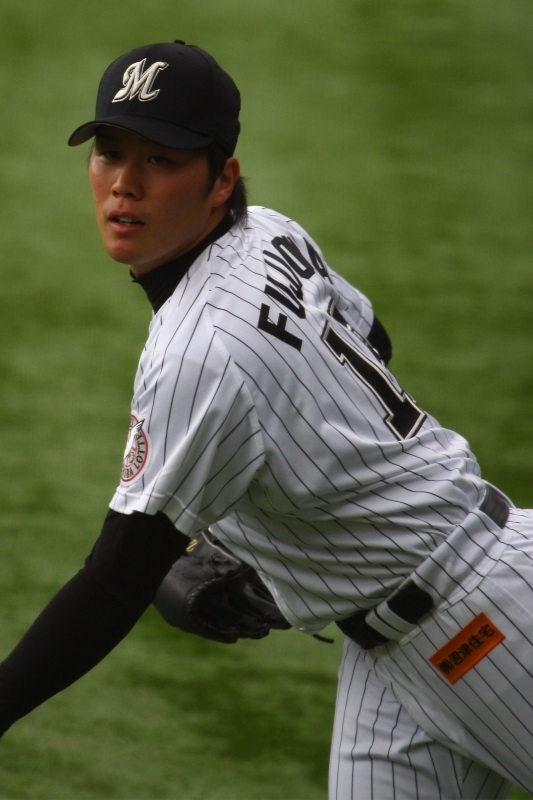
- Fujioka with the Chiba Lotte Marines
- Pitcher
- Born: July 17, 1989 (age 37); Kitagunma District, Gunma, Japan
- Batted: Left Threw: Left

NPB debut
- April 1, 2012, for the Chiba Lotte Marines

Last NPB appearance
- October 11, 2020, for the Yomiuri Giants

NPB statistics
- Win–loss record: 21–32
- Earned Run Average: 4.14
- Strikeouts: 359
- Stats at Baseball Reference

Teams
- Chiba Lotte Marines (2012–2018); Hokkaido Nippon-Ham Fighters (2018–2019); Yomiuri Giants (2019–2020)

Takahiro Fujioka (藤岡 貴裕; born July 17, 1989 in Kitagunma District, Gunma) is a Japanese former professional baseball pitcher. He played in Nippon Professional Baseball (NPB) for the Chiba Lotte Marines, Hokkaido Nippon-Ham Fighters, and Yomiuri Giants.

== Career ==
Chiba Lotte Marines selected Fujioka with the first selection in the 2011 NPB draft.

On April 1, 2012, Fujioka made his NPB debut.

On December 2, 2020, he became a free agent.

On January 6, 2021, Fujioka announced his retirement.
