= Naoki Shirane =

Japanese baseball player (born 1993)

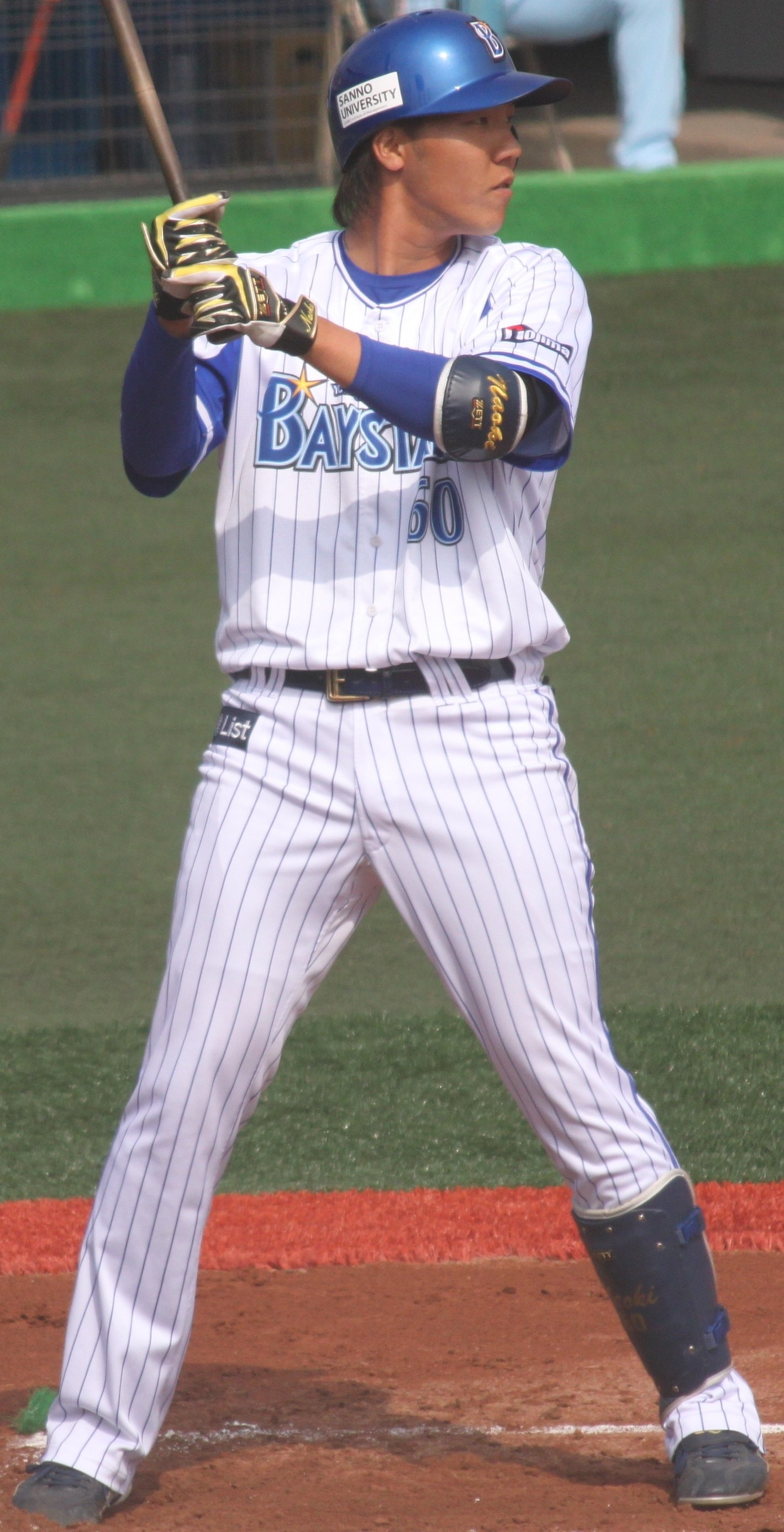
- Hosokawa with the Yokohama DeNA BayStars
- Outfielder
- Born: April 28, 1993 (age 32); Matsue, Shimane, Japan
- Bats: Right Throws: Right

debut
- April 16, 2016, for the Yokohama DeNA BayStars

Career statistics (through 2018 season)
- Batting average: .176
- Home runs: 1
- Runs batted in: 2
- Stats at Baseball Reference

Teams
- Fukuoka SoftBank Hawks (2012–2015); Yokohama DeNA BayStars (2016–2018)

Naoki Shirane (白根 尚貴, Shirane Naoki; born April 28, 1993 in Atsugi, Kanagawa, Japan) is a former professional Japanese baseball player. He played as an outfielder for the Fukuoka SoftBank Hawks and the Yokohama DeNA BayStars.
