= Shinji Tajima =

Japanese baseball player (born 1989)

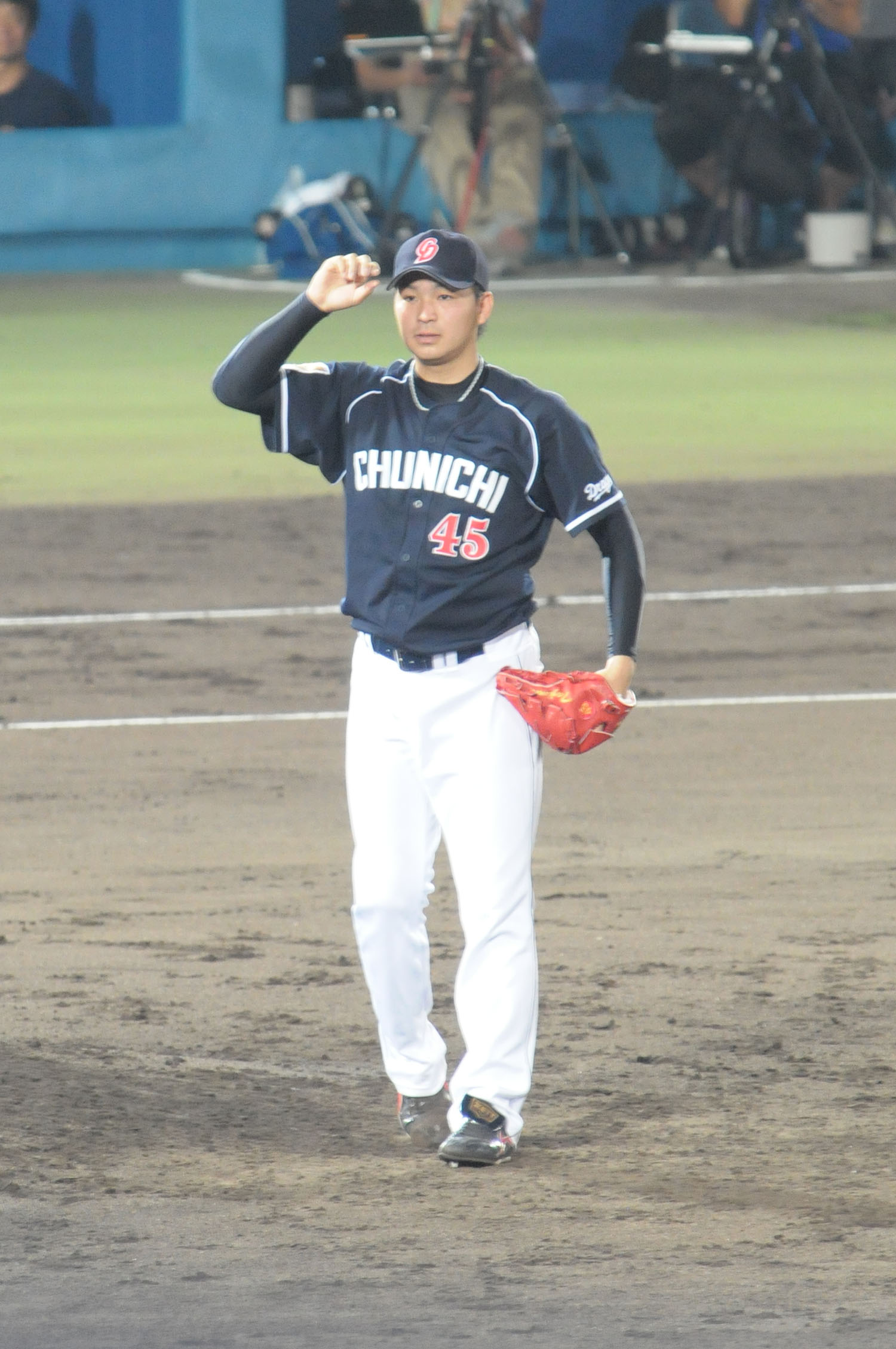
- Tajima with the Chunichi Dragons

Chunichi Dragons – No. 98
- Pitcher/Coach
- Born: December 21, 1989 (age 36); Nagoya, Aichi, Japan
- Batted: Right Threw: Right

NPB debut
- March 31, 2012, for the Chunichi Dragons

Last NPB appearance
- October 5, 2024, for the Chunichi Dragons

Career statistics
- Win–loss: 25-41
- ERA: 3.62
- Strikeouts: 438
- Saves: 75
- Stats at Baseball Reference

Teams
- As player: Chunichi Dragons (2012–2024); As coach: Chunichi Dragons (2025–present)

Career highlights and awards
- 2x NPB All-Star selection (2012, 2016)

Shinji Tajima (田島 慎二, Tajima Shinji; born December 21, 1989) is a Japanese former professional baseball pitcher who currently serves as the pitching coach for the Chunichi Dragons of Nippon Professional Baseball (NPB). He played 12 seasons in NPB from 2012 to 2024 for the Dragons.

== Career ==
In the 2016 NPB season, Tajima tied a Japanese baseball record for most games pitched without conceding a run starting from opening day recording 31 consecutive scoreless games. He tied the Dragons record for consecutive scoreless games held by former teammate Akifumi Takahashi.

On September 16, 2024, Tajima announced that he would be retiring following the conclusion of the season.
