= Masato Furuno =

Japanese baseball player

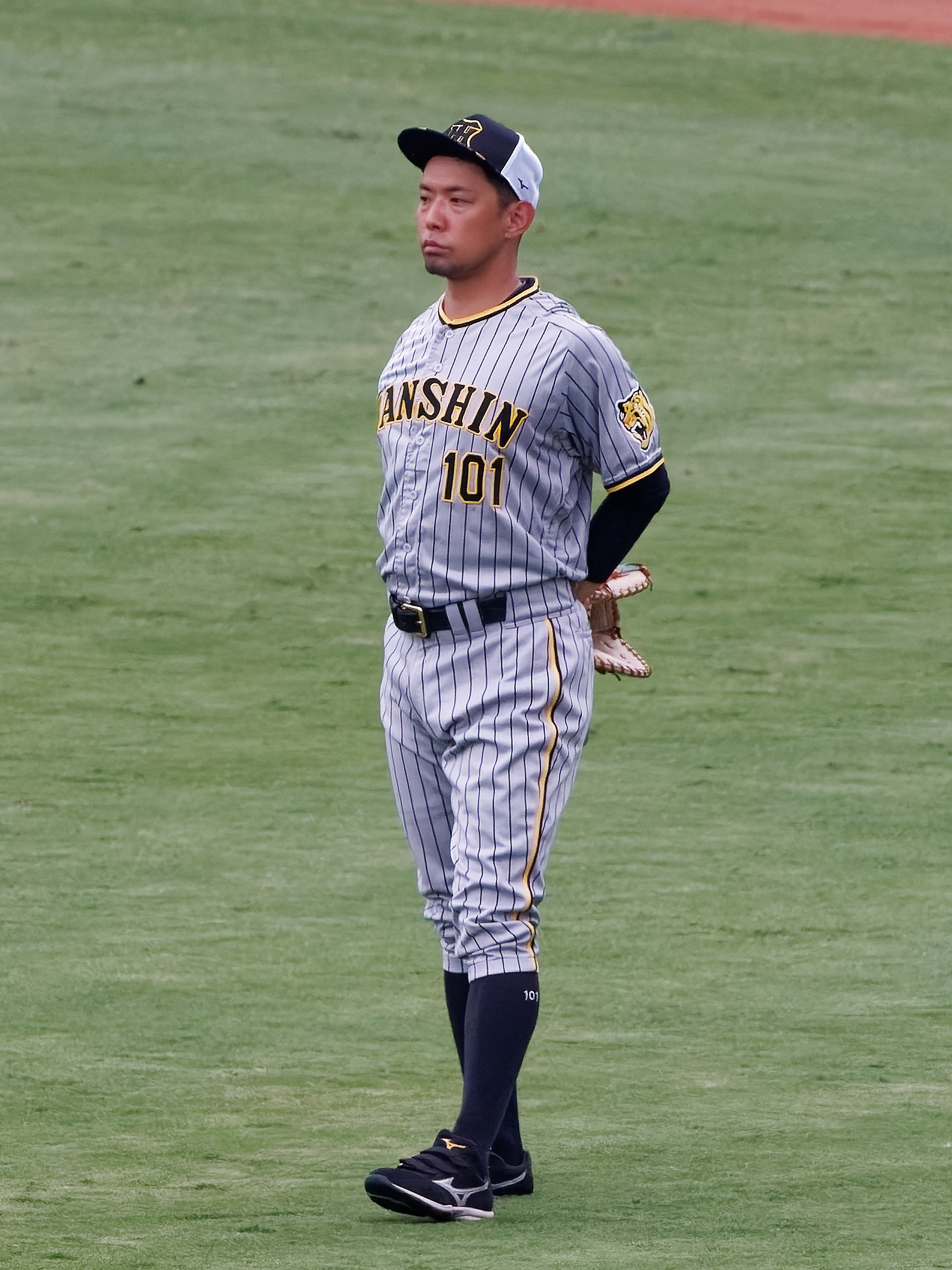
- Furuno with the Hanshin Tigers
- Pitcher
- Born: September 27, 1986 (age 39); Takarazuka, Hyōgo, Japan
- Batted: Right Threw: Right

NPB debut
- April 19, 2013, for the Tokyo Yakult Swallows

Last NPB appearance
- August 29, 2018, for the Tokyo Yakult Swallows

NPB statistics
- Win–loss record: 9-12
- Earned run average: 5.30
- Strikeouts: 113
- Saves: 0
- Holds: 2
- Stats at Baseball Reference

Teams
- Tokyo Yakult Swallows (2012–2018)

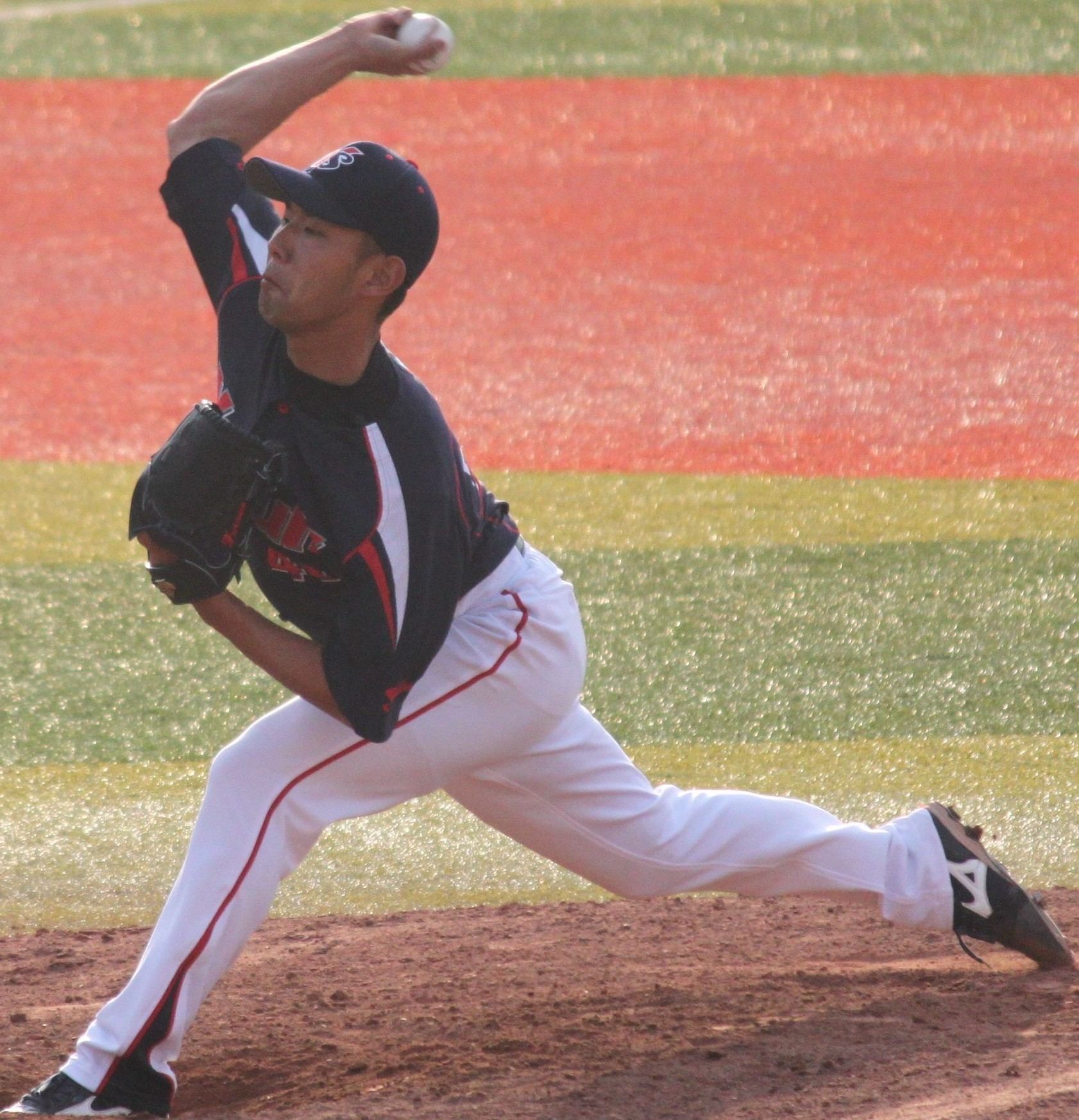
Furuno with the Tokyo Yakult Swallows

Masato Furuno (古野 正人, Furuno Masato; born September 27, 1986 in Takarazuka, Hyōgo Prefecture, Japan) is a former professional Japanese baseball player. He played pitcher for the Tokyo Yakult Swallows. He has been a batting practice pitcher for the Hanshin Tigers since 2018.
