= Go Kamamoto =

Japanese baseball player (born 1993)

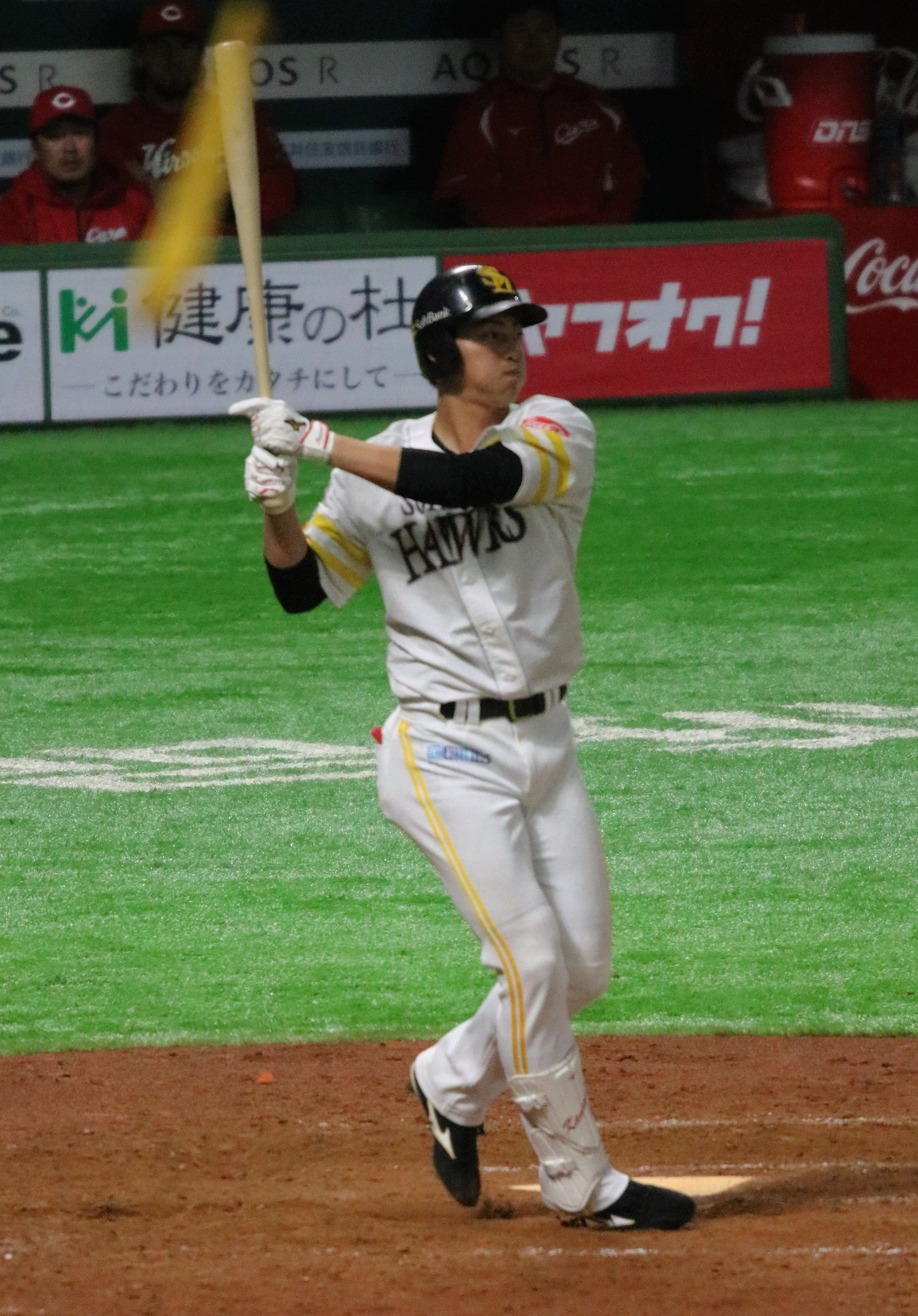
- Kamamoto with the Fukuoka SoftBank Hawks

Fukuoka SoftBank Hawks – No. 015
- Outfielder / Coach
- Born: September 3, 1993 (age 32); Isahaya, Nagasaki, Japan
- Batted: Left Threw: Right

NPB debut
- September 14, 2016, for the Fukuoka SoftBank Hawks

Last NPB appearance
- October 25, 2021, for the Fukuoka SoftBank Hawks

NPB statistics
- Batting average: .222
- Home runs: 5
- Run batted in: 16
- Stats at Baseball Reference

Teams
- As player: Fukuoka SoftBank Hawks (2012–2021); Tohoku Rakuten Golden Eagles (2022); As coach: Fukuoka SoftBank Hawks (2024–present)

Career highlights and awards
- As player: Japan Series champion (2020); Western League Excellent Player Award (2017); Western League Most Stolen base Leader Award (2016, 2017); As coach: Japan Series champion (2025)

Go Kamamoto (釜元 豪, Kamamoto Gō; born September 3, 1993) is a Japanese former professional baseball outfielder, and current fourth squad outfield defense and base running coach for the Fukuoka SoftBank Hawks of Nippon Professional Baseball (NPB). He played in NPB for the Hawks and Tohoku Rakuten Golden Eagles.

== Professional career ==
=== Active player era ===
==== Fukuoka SoftBank Hawks ====
On October 27, 2011, Kamamoto was drafted as a developmental player by the Fukuoka Softbank Hawks in the 2011 Nippon Professional Baseball draft.

On June 1, 2012, Kamamoto underwent surgery for a broken left hand.

In 2012 - 2015 season, he played in informal matches against Shikoku Island League Plus's teams and amateur baseball teams, and played in the Western League of NPB's minor leagues.

On July 31, 2015, Kamamoto signed a 6 million yen contract with the Fukuoka SoftBank Hawks as a registered player under control

On September 14, 2016, Kamamoto debuted against the Tohoku Rakuten Golden Eagles. And he was honored with the 2016 Western League Most Stolen base Leader Award.

In 2017 season, Kamamoto played two games in the Pacific League. And he recorded a 26 stolen bases in the Western League and was honored with the 2017 Western League Most Stolen base Leader Award and 2017 Western League Excellent Player Award.

In 2018 season, Kamamoto played 6 games in the Pacific League.

On April 6, 2019, Kamamoto recorded his first hit against Chiba Lotte Marines. On the 7th of the following day, he recorded his first home run. In the 2019 season, he finished the regular season in 86 games with a batting average of .270, a 4 home runs, a 11 stolen bases.

In 2020 season, Kamamoto finished the regular season in 32 games with a batting average of .192, and a RBI of 2. And he was selected as the Japan Series roster in the 2020 Japan Series.

In 2021 season, Kamamoto finished the regular season in 18 games with a batting average of .500, a RBI of 3. On October 26, the Hawks announced release him.

==== Tohoku Rakuten Golden Eagles ====
On December 9, 2021, Kamamoto signed with the Tohoku Rakuten Golden Eagles as a developmental player.

In 2022 season, Kamamoto played in 96 games with a batted .259, one home run, and a 26 RBIs in the Eastern League, but the Eagles announced his release on October 19.

=== After retirement ===
On January 20, 2023, Kamamoto announced his retirement from active player. He has been a team staff member for the Fukuoka SoftBank Hawks since the 2023 season.

On October 31, 2023, kamamoto became the fourth squad outfield defense and base running coach of the Fukuoka Softbank Hawks.
