= Wataru Hiyane =

Japanese baseball player (born 1987)

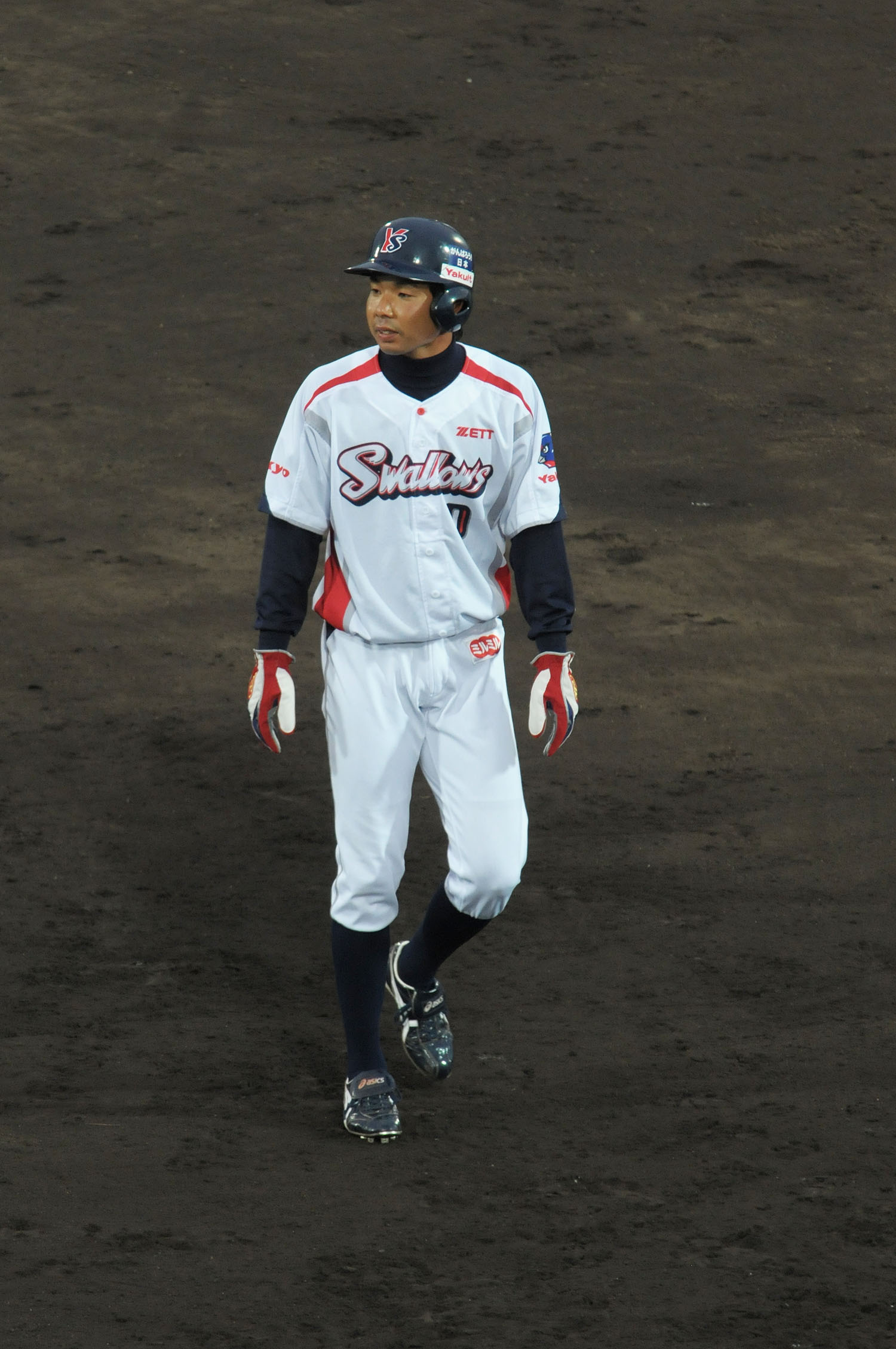
- Hiyane with the Tokyo Yakult Swallows

Yamato Takada Club – No. 8
- Outfielder
- Born: June 20, 1987 (age 39); Shimajiri District, Okinawa, Japan
- Batted: Right Threw: Right

NPB debut
- April 1, 2012, for the Tokyo Yakult Swallows

Last NPB appearance
- September 26, 2018, for the Tokyo Yakult Swallows

Career statistics
- Batting average: .236
- Home runs: 4
- Runs batted in: 33
- Stats at Baseball Reference

Teams
- Tokyo Yakult Swallows (2012–2018)

Wataru Hiyane (比屋根 渉, Hiyane Wataru; born June 20, 1987 in Shimajiri District, Okinawa, Japan) is a Japanese professional baseball outfielder for the Yamato Takada Club. He has also played in Nippon Professional Baseball (NPB) for the Tokyo Yakult Swallows.
