= Ryoichi Adachi =

Japanese baseball player (born 1988)

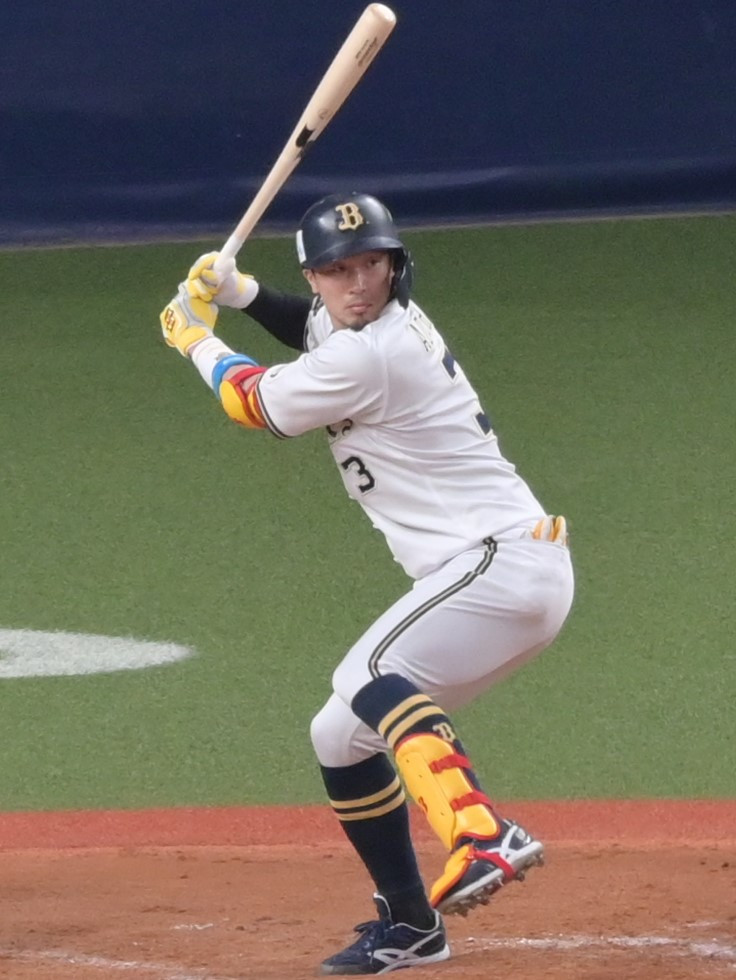
- Adachi in 2021 with the Orix Buffaloes

Orix Buffaloes – No. 83
- Infielder / Coach
- Born: January 7, 1988 (age 38); Takasaki, Gunma, Japan
- Batted: Right Threw: Right

NPB debut
- May 12, 2012, for the Orix Buffaloes

Last NPB appearance
- September 24, 2024, for the Orix Buffaloes

NPB statistics
- Batting average: .243
- Home runs: 36
- RBI: 325
- Stolen bases: 127
- Stats at Baseball Reference

Teams
- As player: Orix Buffaloes (2012–2024); As coach: Orix Buffaloes (2024–present)

Career highlights and awards
- NPB All-Star (2018); Japan Series champion (2022)

Ryoichi Adachi (安達 了一, Adachi Ryōichi; born January 7, 1988) is a Japanese former professional baseball infielder. He played in Nippon Professional Baseball (NPB) from 2012 to 2024 for the Orix Buffaloes.

== Career ==
Adachi was selected to play in the 2018 NPB All-Star game.

On September 13, 2024, Adachi announced that he would be retiring following the conclusion of the season.
