= Masashi Nishimori =

Japanese baseball player (born 1987)

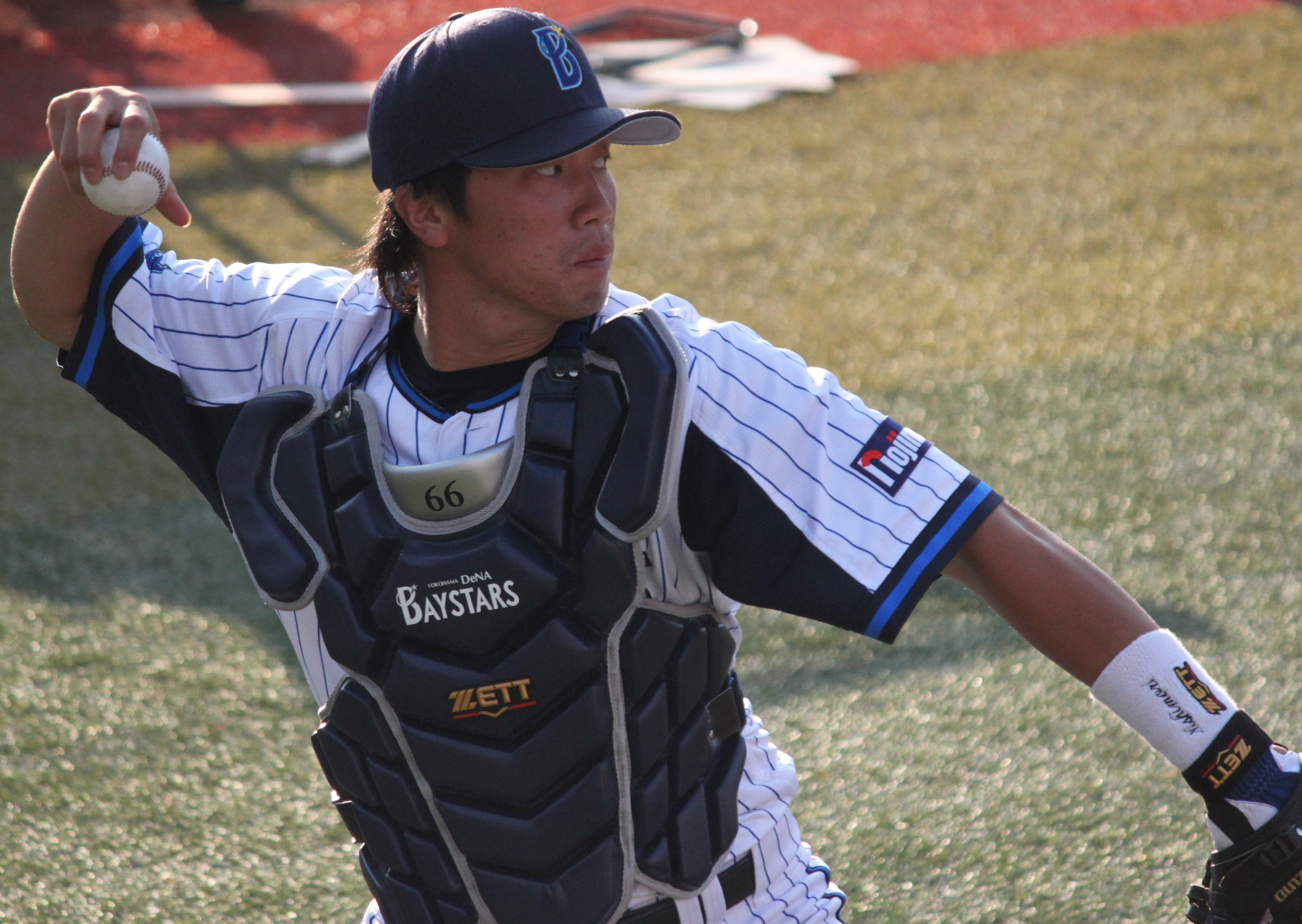
- Nishimori with the Yokohama DeNA BayStars
- Catcher
- Born: December 29, 1987 (age 38); Kyoto, Kyoto, Japan
- Bats: Both Throws: Right

debut
- July 27, 2013, for the Yokohama DeNA BayStars

Career statistics (through 2019 season)
- Batting average: .056
- Home runs: 0
- Runs batted in: 1

Teams
- Yokohama DeNA BayStars (2012–2019)

Masashi Nishimori (西森 将司, Nishimori Masashi; born December 29, 1989 in Kyoto, Kyoto, Japan) is a professional Japanese baseball player. He plays catcher for the Yokohama DeNA BayStars.
