= Tatsuya Satoh =

Japanese baseball player

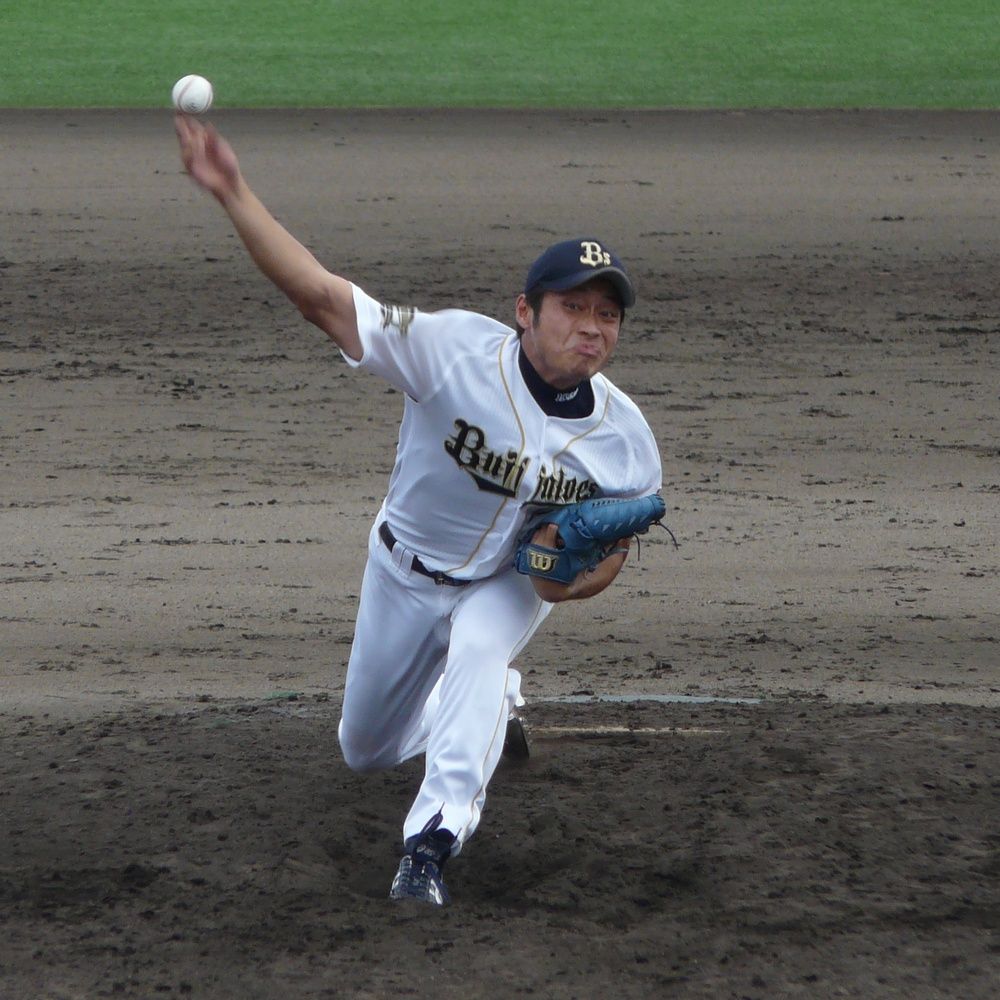
- Satoh with the Orix Buffaloes
- Pitcher
- Born: July 26, 1986 (age 39); Ōmiya, Saitama, Japan
- Bats: Right Throws: Right

NPB debut
- April 25, 2012, for the Orix Buffaloes

NPB statistics (through 2016 season)
- Win–loss: 11–21
- ERA: 2.71
- Strikeouts: 338
- Stats at Baseball Reference

Teams
- Orix Buffaloes (2012–2018)

Career highlights and awards
- 2× NPB All-Star (2013–2014); 2× Pacific League Best Relief Pitcher Award (2013-2014)

Tatsuya Satoh (佐藤 達也, Satō Tatsuya; born July 26, 1986 in Ōmiya, Saitama, Japan) is a Japanese professional baseball pitcher who is a free agent.
