= Takeaki Tokuyama =

Japanese baseball player

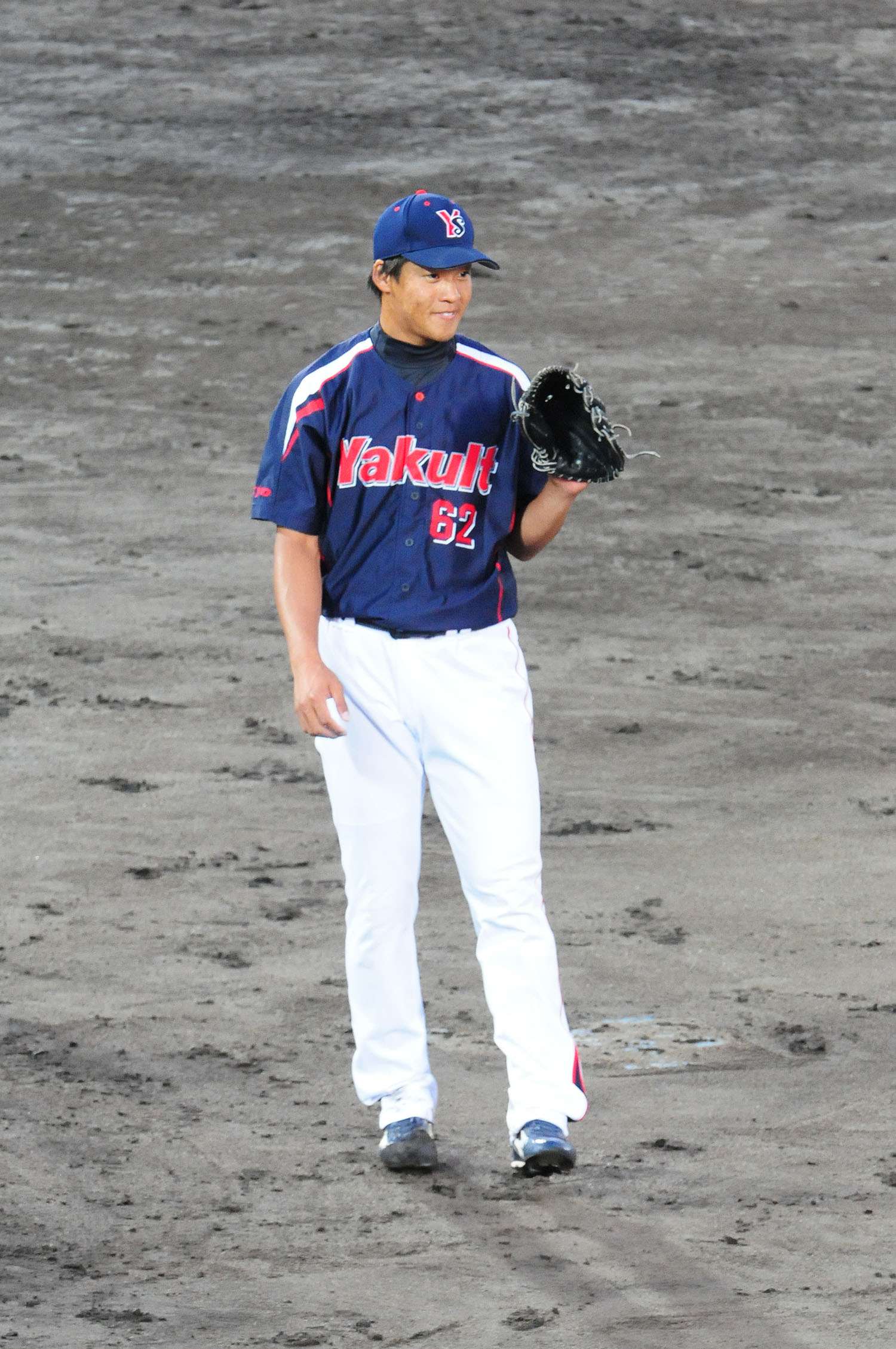
- Tokuyama with the Tokyo Yakult Swallows
- Pitcher
- Born: July 21, 1989 (age 36); Kobe, Hyōgo, Japan
- Batted: Both Threw: Right

NPB debut
- May 15, 2013, for the Tokyo Yakult Swallows

Last NPB appearance
- June 29, 2016, for the Tokyo Yakult Swallows

NPB statistics
- Win–loss record: 3-4
- Earned run average: 4.55
- Strikeouts: 76
- Saves: 0
- Holds: 3
- Stats at Baseball Reference

Teams
- Tokyo Yakult Swallows (2012–2017)

Takeaki Tokuyama (徳山 武陽, Tokuyama Takeaki; born July 21, 1989 in Kobe, Hyōgo, Japan) is a professional Japanese baseball player. He plays pitcher for the Tokyo Yakult Swallows.
