= Ryohei Kiya =

Japanese baseball player

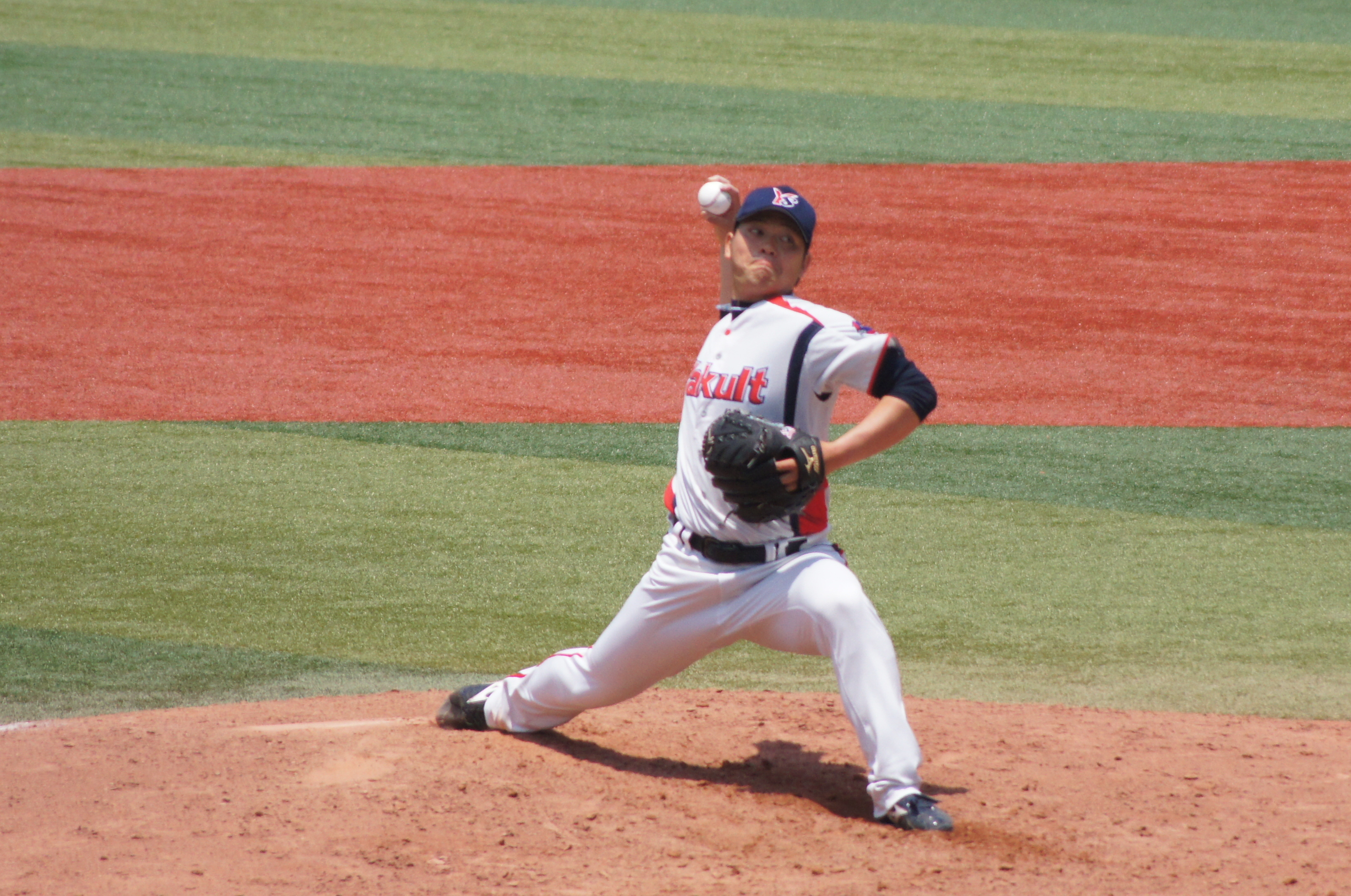
- Pitcher
- Born: April 7, 1989 (age 37); Kitakyushu, Fukuoka, Japan
- Batted: Right Threw: Right

NPB debut
- June 3, 2013, for the Tokyo Yakult Swallows

Last NPB appearance
- August 5, 2016, for the Tokyo Yakult Swallows

NPB statistics
- Win–loss record: 7-9
- Earned run average: 5.61
- Strikeouts: 93
- Saves: 0
- Holds: 3
- Stats at Baseball Reference

Teams
- Tokyo Yakult Swallows (2012–2016)

Ryohei Kiya (木谷 良平, Kiya Ryohei; born April 7, 1989 in Kitakyushu, Fukuoka, Japan) is a professional Japanese baseball player. He plays pitcher for the Tokyo Yakult Swallows.
