= Ken Togame =

Japanese baseball player

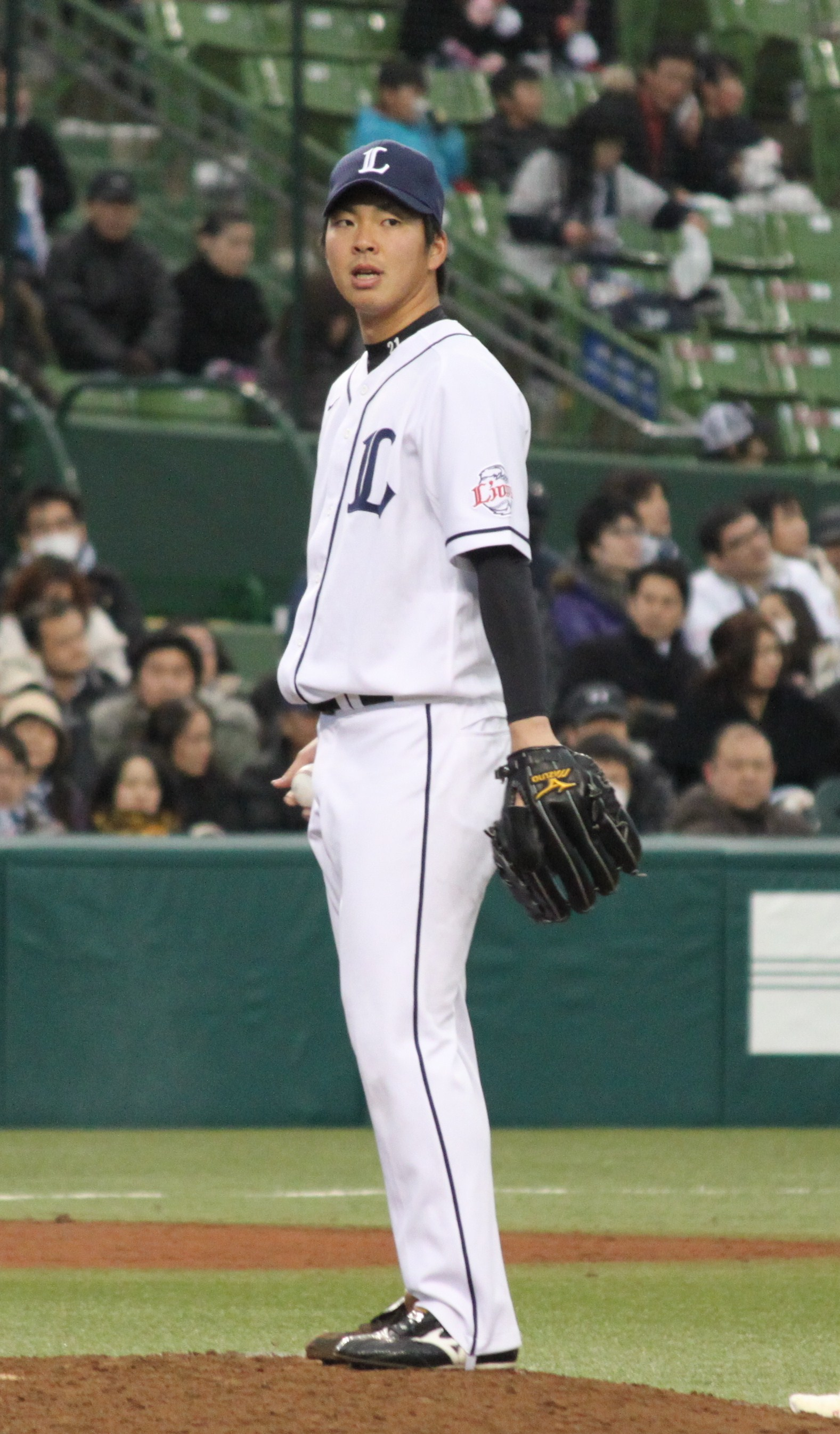
- Togame with the Saitama Seibu Lions
- Pitcher
- Born: November 7, 1987 (age 38); Toyota, Aichi, Japan
- Batted: Right Threw: Right

NPB debut
- May 30, 2012, for the Saitama Seibu Lions

Last NPB appearance
- October 2, 2022, for the Saitama Seibu Lions

Career statistics (through April 5, 2022)
- Win–loss record: 53-50
- ERA: 4.00
- Strikeouts: 622
- Stats at Baseball Reference

Teams
- Saitama Seibu Lions (2012–2022)

Ken Togame (十亀 剣, Togame Ken; born November 7, 1987) is a professional Japanese baseball player. He plays pitcher for the Saitama Seibu Lions.
