= Yoshitaka Muto =

Japanese baseball player

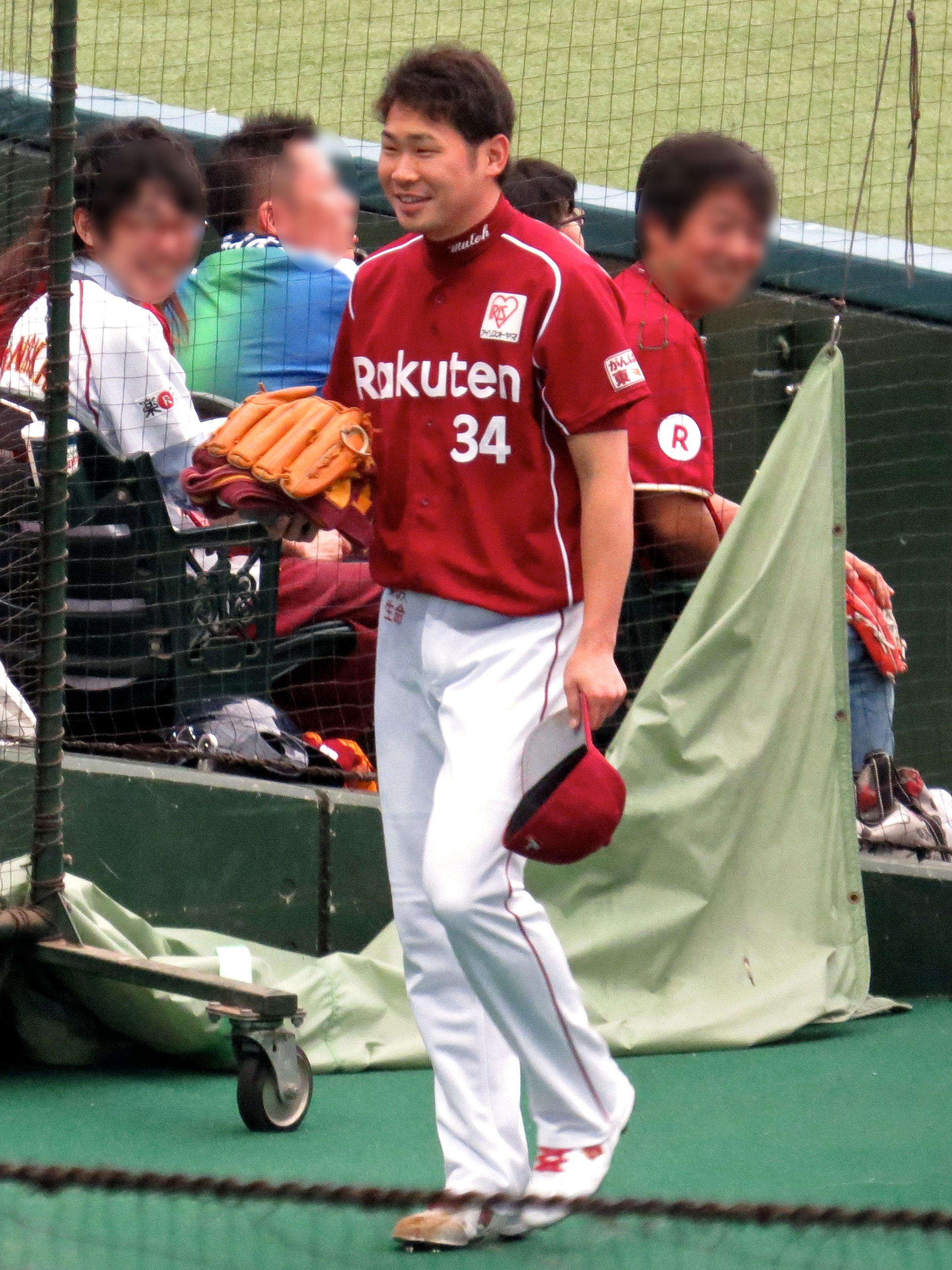
- Muto with the Tohoku Rakuten Golden Eagles
- Pitcher
- Born: July 22, 1987 (age 38)
- Bats: Right Throws: Right

NPB debut
- 2012, for the Tohoku Rakuten Golden Eagles

NPB statistics (through 2016)
- Win–loss record: 4-4
- ERA: 4.96
- Strikeouts: 63

Teams
- Tohoku Rakuten Golden Eagles (2012, 2014–2016)

Yoshitaka Muto (武藤 好貴, Mutō Yoshitaka; born July 22, 1987 in Sapporo, Hokkaido) is a Japanese former professional baseball pitcher in Japan's Nippon Professional Baseball. He played for the Tohoku Rakuten Golden Eagles in 2012 and from 2014 to 2016.
