= Takayoshi Kawabata =

Japanese baseball player (born 1985)

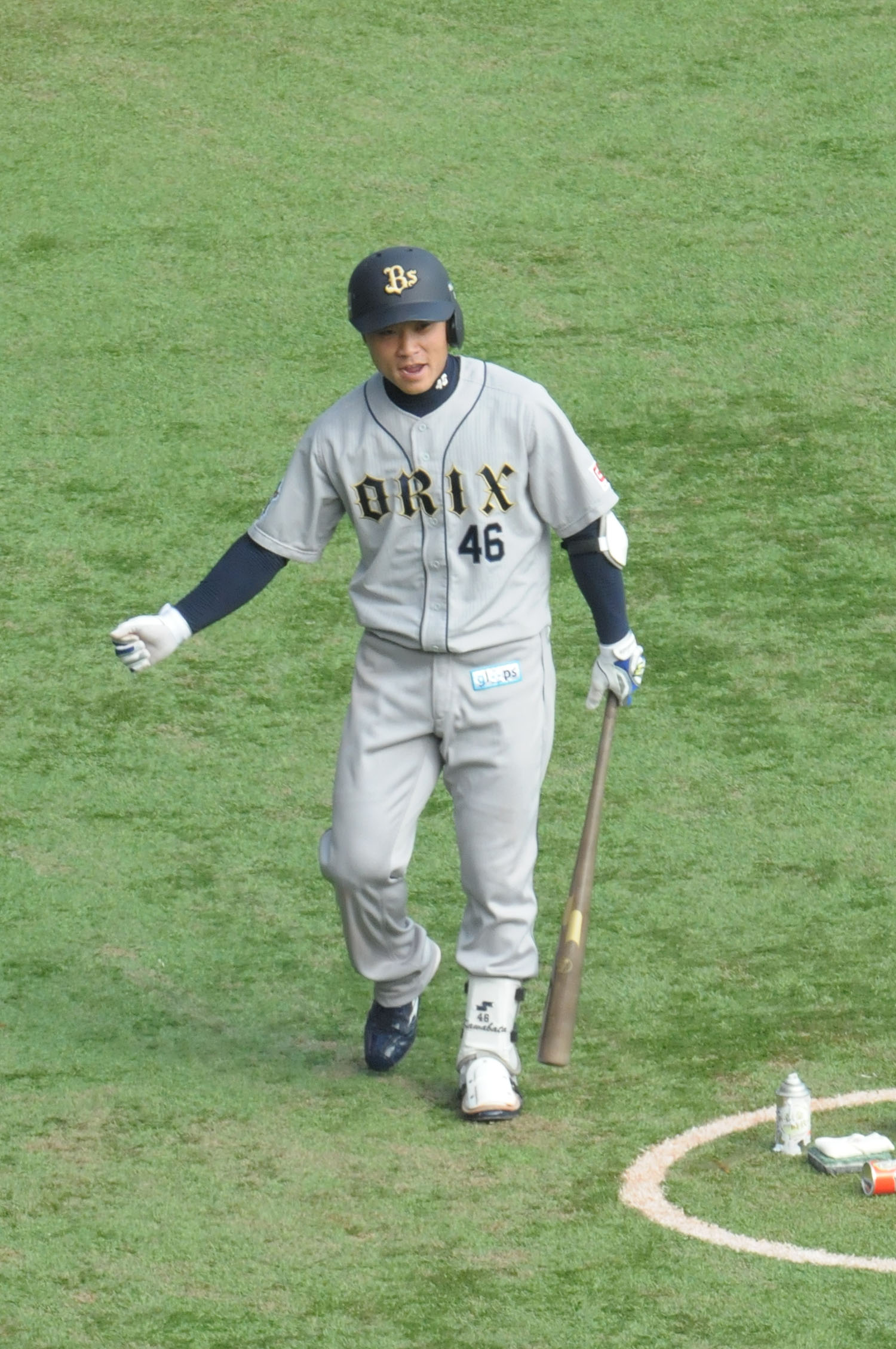
- Kawabata with the Orix Buffaloes
- Outfielder / Coach
- Born: February 4, 1985 (age 41); Yaizu, Shizuoka, Japan
- Bats: Right Throws: Right

NPB debut
- March 30, 2012, for the Orix Buffaloes

NPB statistics (through 2016)
- Batting average: .257
- Home runs: 5
- RBI: 71
- Stats at Baseball Reference

Teams
- As player: Orix Buffaloes (2012–2017); As coach: Orix Buffaloes (2018)

Takayoshi Kawabata (川端 崇義, Kawabata Takayoshi; born February 4, 1985 in Yaizu, Shizuoka, Japan) is a Japanese professional baseball outfielder for the Orix Buffaloes in Japan's Nippon Professional Baseball.
