= Kyōhei Kamezawa =

Japanese baseball player (born 1988)

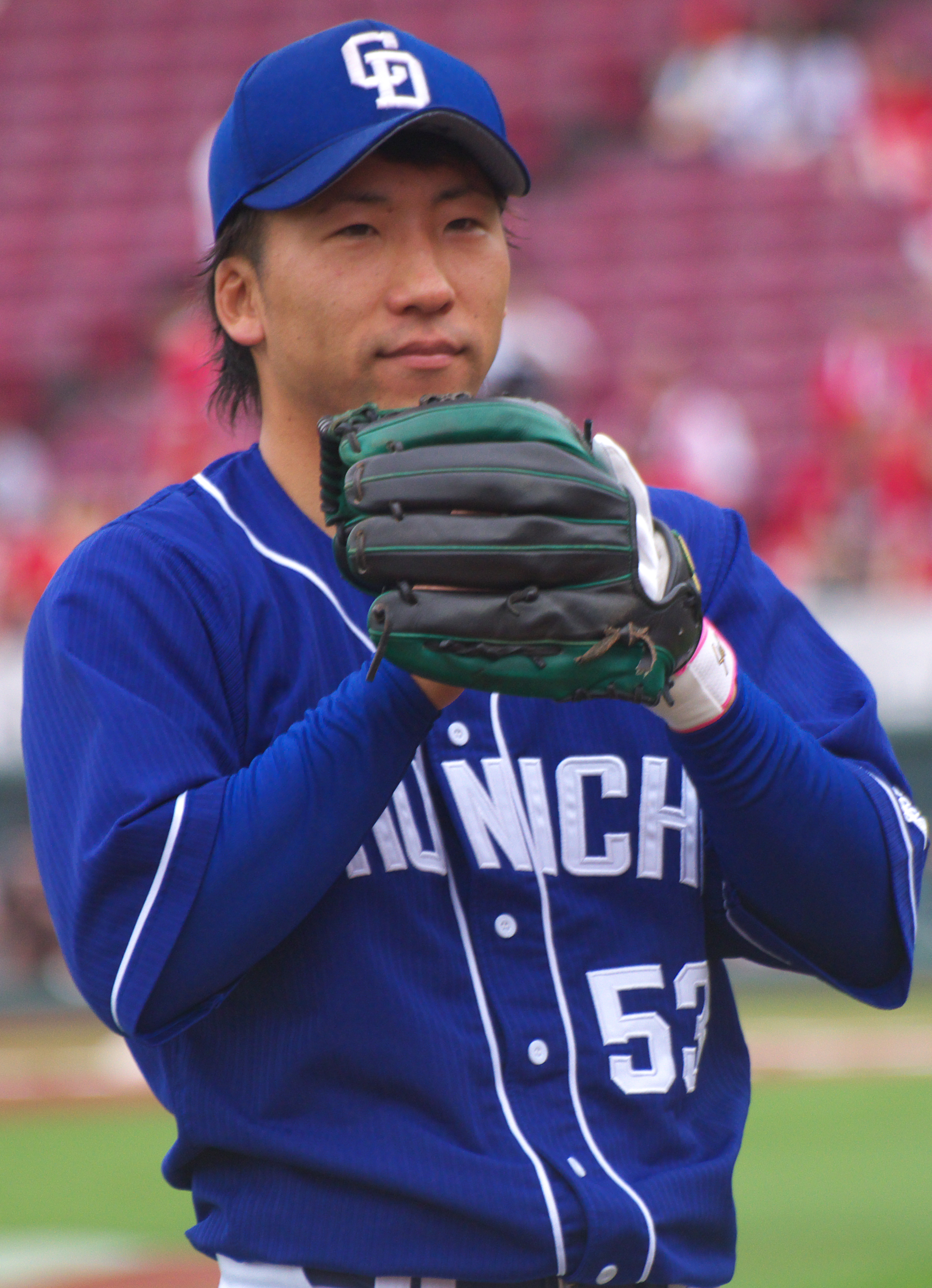
- Kamezawa with the Chunichi Dragons

Free Agent
- Infielder
- Born: October 15, 1988 (age 37); Tsuyama, Okayama, Japan
- Bats: Right Throws: Right

debut
- March 29, 2015, for the Chunichi Dragons

NPB statistics (through 2016)
- Batting average: .257
- Home runs: 0
- RBI: 17
- Stats at Baseball Reference

Teams
- Fukuoka SoftBank Hawks (2012–2014); Chunichi Dragons (2015–2019)

Kyōhei Kamezawa (亀澤 恭平, Kamezawa Kyōhei; born October 15, 1988) is a Japanese professional baseball player. He played for the Fukuoka SoftBank Hawks and Chunichi Dragons for the Nippon Professional Baseball(NPB).

On December 2, 2019, he became a free agent.
