= Takaya Toda =

Japanese baseball player

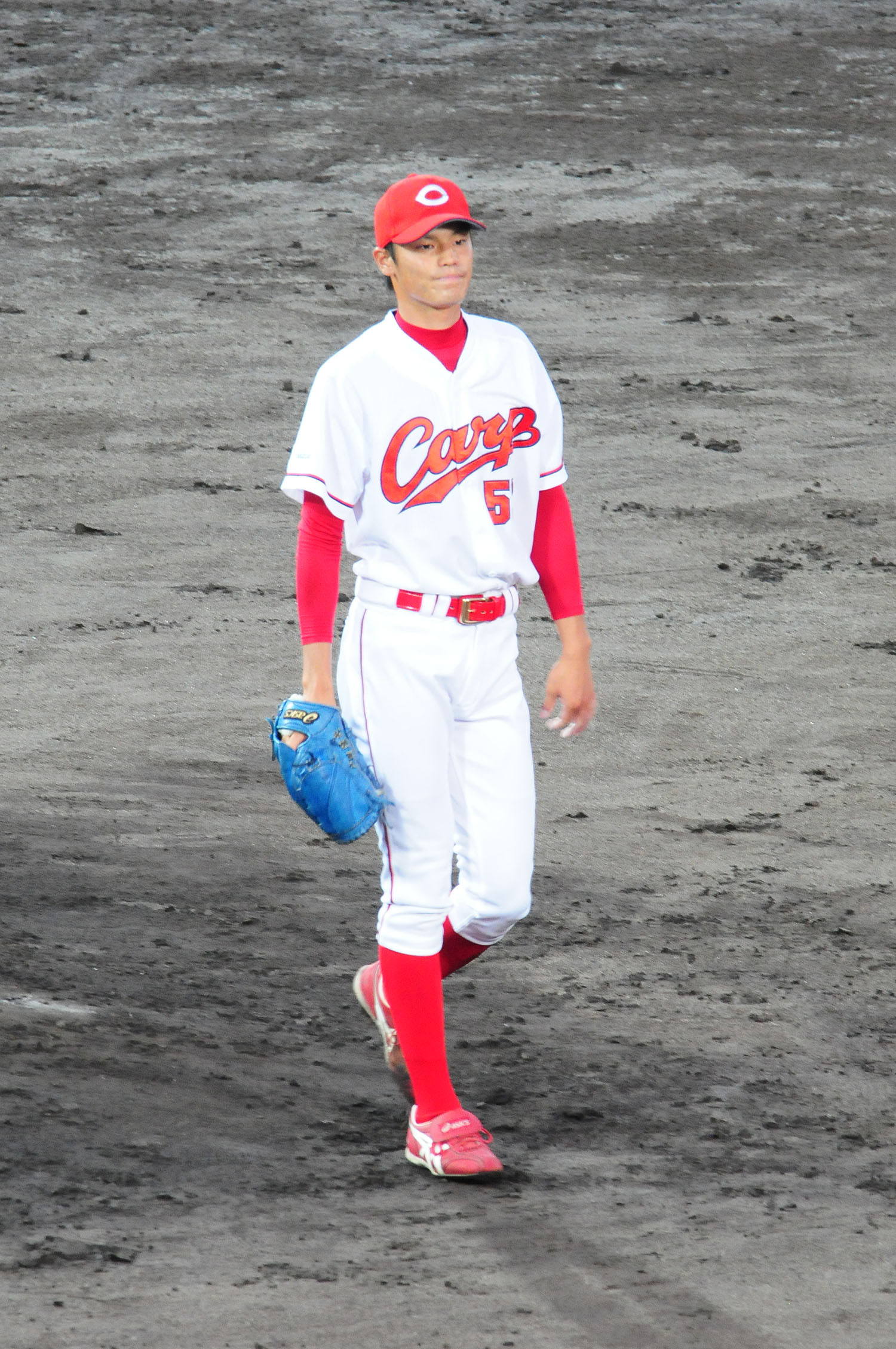
- Pitcher
- Born: June 10, 1993 (age 32); Kobe, Hyōgo, Japan
- Batted: Left Threw: Left

debut
- September 12, 2012, for the Hiroshima Toyo Carp

Last appearance
- September 29, 2018, for the Hiroshima Toyo Carp

NPB statistics (through 2020 season)
- Win–loss record: 11-7
- ERA: 3.94
- Strikeouts: 146
- Stats at Baseball Reference

Teams
- Hiroshima Toyo Carp (2012–2022)

Takaya Toda (戸田 隆矢, Toda Takaya; born June 10, 1993 in Kobe, Hyōgo, Japan) is a professional Japanese baseball player. He plays pitcher for the Hiroshima Toyo Carp.
