= Naoto Nishida =

Japanese baseball player (born 1993)

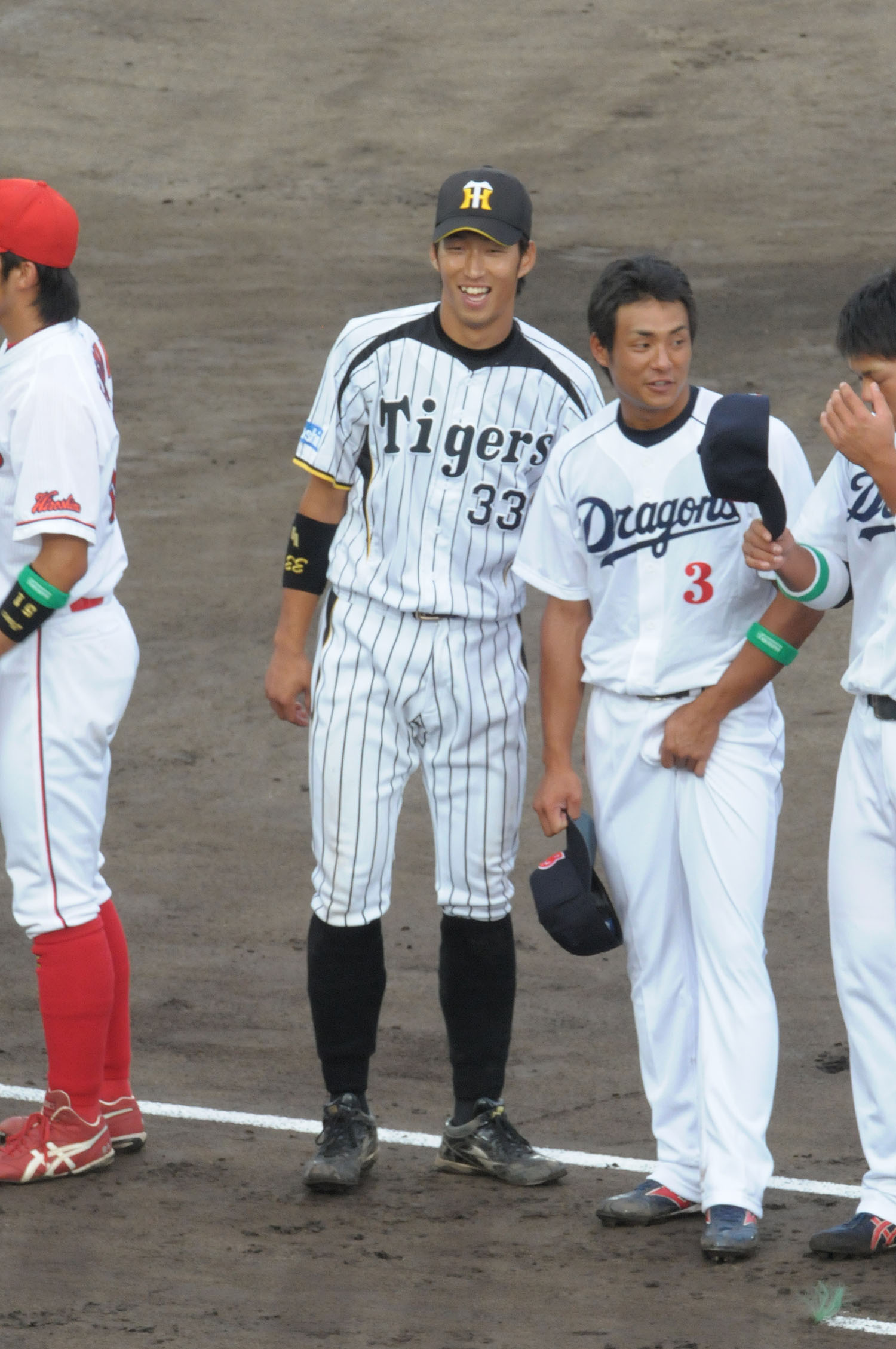
- Nishida with the Hanshin Tigers
- Infielder
- Born: April 26, 1993 (age 33)
- Bats: Left Throws: Right

NPB debut
- July 28, 2013, for the Hanshin Tigers

NPB statistics (through 2013)
- Games played: 1
- At bats: 2
- Hit: 0
- Stats at Baseball Reference

Teams
- Hanshin Tigers (2013)

Naoto Nishida (西田 直斗, Nishida Naoto; born 26 April 1993 in Kashiwara, Osaka) is a professional baseball player, and an infielder for the Hanshin Tigers, a team in Japan's Nippon Professional Baseball League.

== Early baseball career ==
Nishida attended Osaka Tōin High School and became a member of the first-team of the school's baseball club in the second half of his first year. In his second year he became a starting member and his school was selected to participate in the 2010 National High School Baseball Invitational Tournament. In the first round match against Chiba Prefecture's Boyo High School, Nishida recorded three hits and batted in five runs in a 9-2 win. In his third year, Osaka Toin lost the championship match of the Osaka Prefecture tournament, thereby failing to qualify for the 2011 national championship tournament. Shintaro Fujinami was a teammate in his final two years of high school, and later became a teammate at Hanshin.

Nishida was selected by the Hanshin Tigers in the third round of the 2011 Nippon Professional Baseball draft.

== Hanshin Tigers ==
=== 2012 ===
In 2012, Nishida spent his entire rookie season with Hanshin's farm team in the Western league. He appeared in 71 matches, batting in 17 runs with a batting average of .237. He spent most of the time fielding at short stop, where he recorded a fielding average of .926.

=== 2013 ===
In 2013 Nishida was selected for the Western League's All-Star Team and batted in the team's only run in the all-star match against the Eastern League's team. On July 28 he made his first appearance in Hanshin's first team, entering the game against the Yokohama DeNA BayStars in the fifth inning as a pinch hitter. He fielded at second base until the end of the match, striking out at both of his at bats. It was to be his only first-team appearance that year.

In the Western League he played 92 matches, recording a batting average of .241 and hitting 2 home runs with 14 runs batted in. He spent most of his time fielding at second base, as rookie Fumiya Hojo took over the short stop position. Nishida recorded fielding averages of .956 and .966 at second base and short stop respectively.
