= Kentaro Nishikawa =

Japanese baseball player

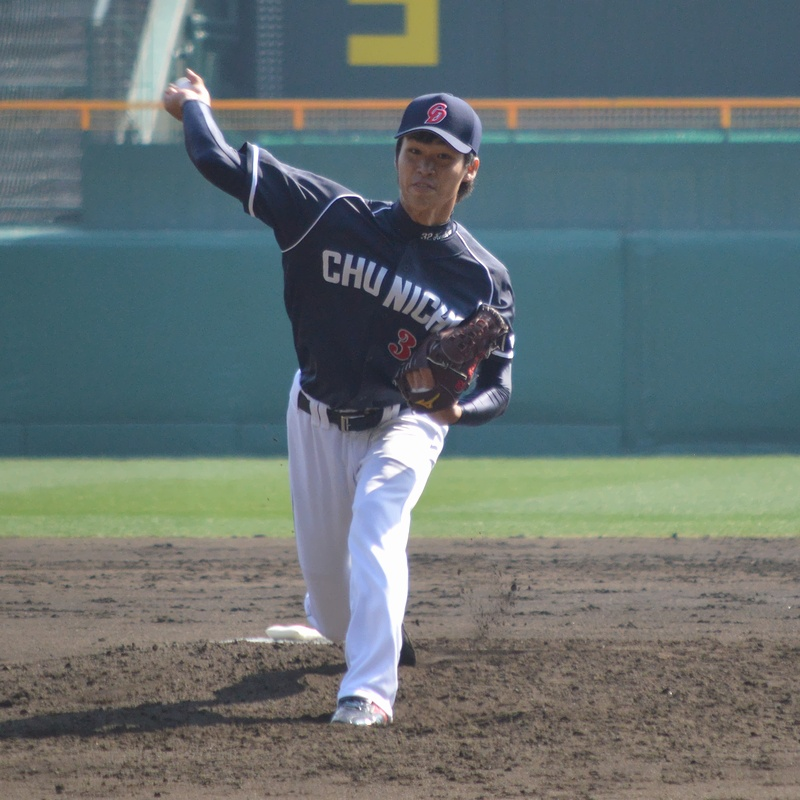

Chunichi Dragons – No. 117
- Batting practice pitcher
- Born: April 18, 1993 (age 32); Kanazawa, Ishikawa, Japan
- Bats: Right Throws: Right

debut
- June 14, 2012, for the Chunichi Dragons

Career statistics (through 2016)
- ERA: 5.37
- Strikeouts: 37
- Stats at Baseball Reference

Teams
- Chunichi Dragons (2012–2016)

Kentaro Nishikawa (西川 健太郎, Nishikawa Kentarō; born April 4, 1993) is a former professional Japanese baseball player. He is currently employed as a batting practice pitcher with the Chunichi Dragons.

On 1 October 2016, Nishikawa was released by the Dragons following a lack of development on the farm team.
