= Takumi Oshima =

Japanese baseball player

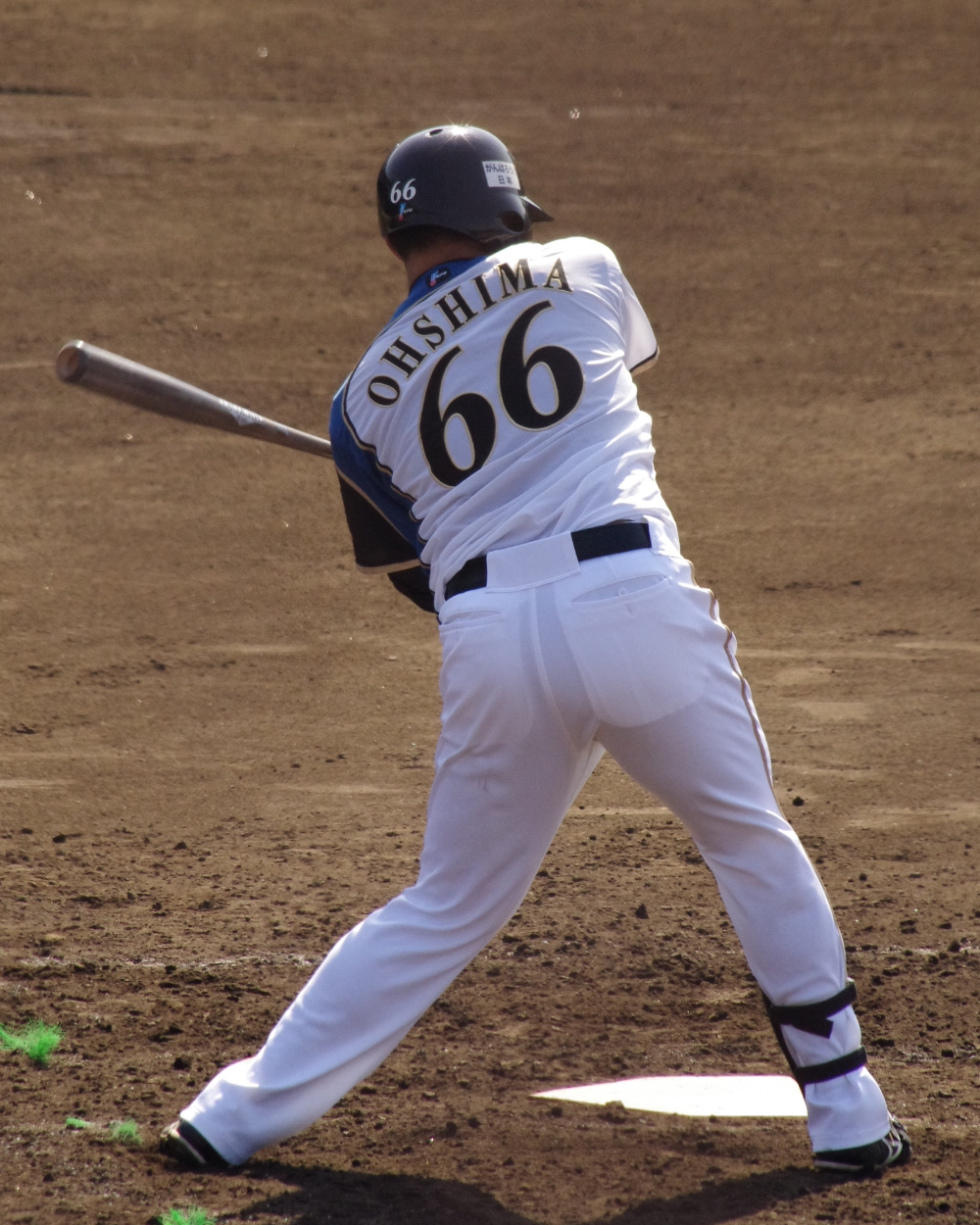
- Oshima with the Hokkaido Nippon Ham Fighters in 2012
- Catcher
- Born: February 14, 1990 (age 36)
- Bats: Left Throws: Right

debut
- 2014, for the Hokkaido Nippon-Ham Fighters

NPB statistics (through 2016)
- Batting average: .188
- Home runs: 0
- RBI: 1
- Stats at Baseball Reference

Teams
- Hokkaido Nippon-Ham Fighters (2014–2018)

Takumi Oshima (Japanese: 大嶋 匠; born 2 February 1990) is a Japanese former professional baseball player who played for the Hokkaido Nippon-Ham Fighters of Nippon Professional Baseball. He made his debut in 2014, which turned out to be his only game of the season. In his one at-bat, he struck out.
