= Takahiro Kawasaki =

Japanese baseball player

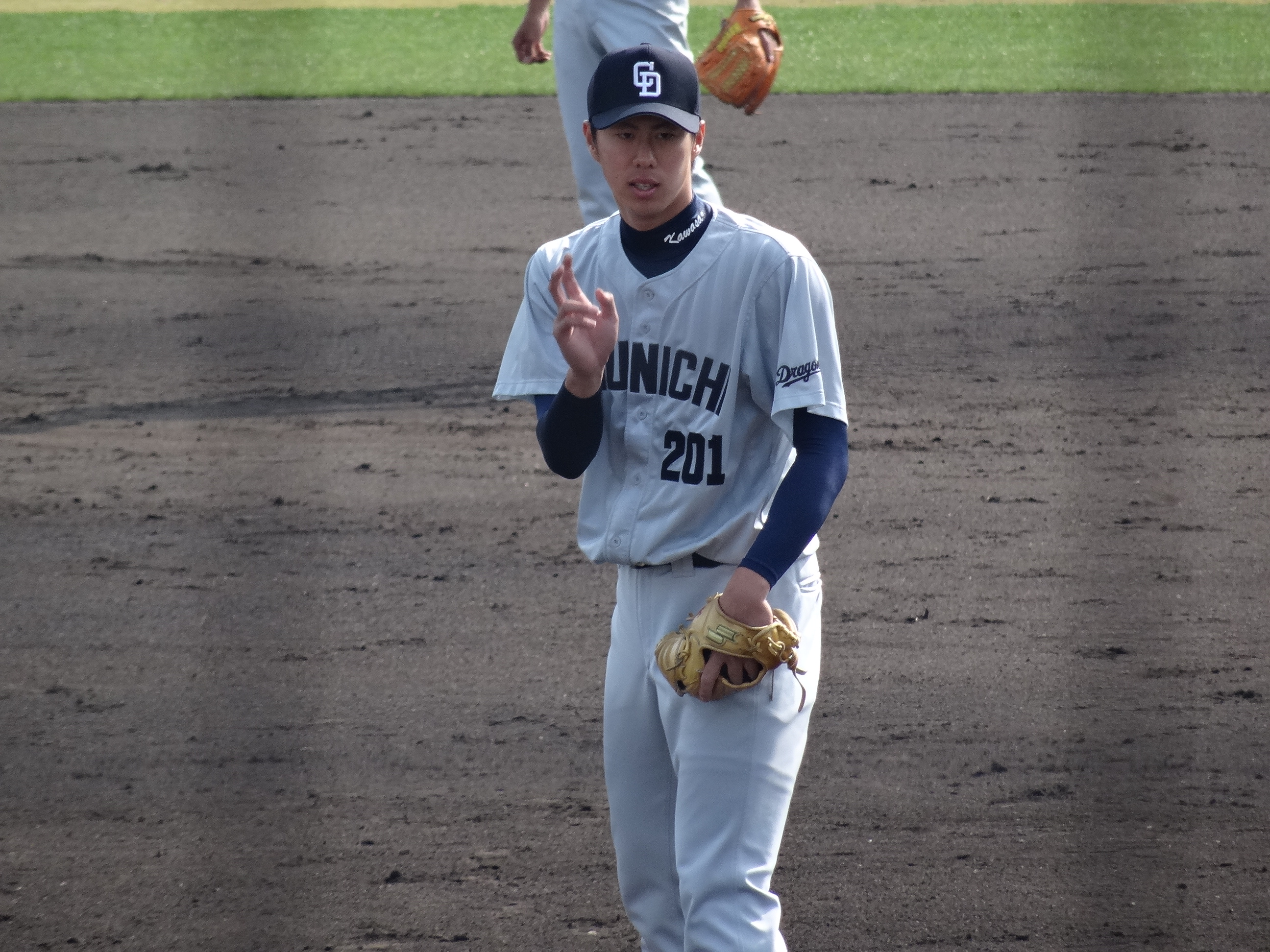
- Pitcher
- Born: August 2, 1993 (age 32); Tsu, Mie, Japan
- Bats: Right Throws: Right

debut
- 2013, for the Chunichi Dragons

Teams
- Chunichi Dragons (2012–2016)

Takahiro Kawasaki (川崎貴弘, Kawasaki Takahiro; born August 2, 1993 in Tsu, Mie, Japan) is a Japanese baseball player. He played formerly as a pitcher for the Chunichi Dragons on a developmental contract in the Western League. He is currently without a team.

On 30 March 2016 he was loaned to the Fukushima Hopes in the Baseball Challenge League.

On 1 October 2016, it was announced that he was deemed surplus to requirements at the Dragons, and therefore released.
