= Toshiharu Moriuchi =

Japanese baseball player

- Pitcher
- Born: January 2, 1985 (age 41)
- Bats: Right Throws: Right

debut
- 2012, for the Hokkaido Nippon-Ham Fighters

Career statistics (through 2013 season)
- WHIP: 2.111
- ERA: 7.00
- SO: 6
- Stats at Baseball Reference

Teams
- Hokkaido Nippon-Ham Fighters (2012–2015)

Toshiharu Moriuchi (森内 壽春, Moriuchi Toshiharu) is a Japanese professional baseball player. He was born on January 2, 1985. He debuted in 2012 for the Hokkaido Nippon-Ham Fighters. He had 37 strikeouts that year.
