= Taisei Gakuin University =

Private university of Osaka

Coordinates: 34°31′29.8″N 135°34′44.3″E

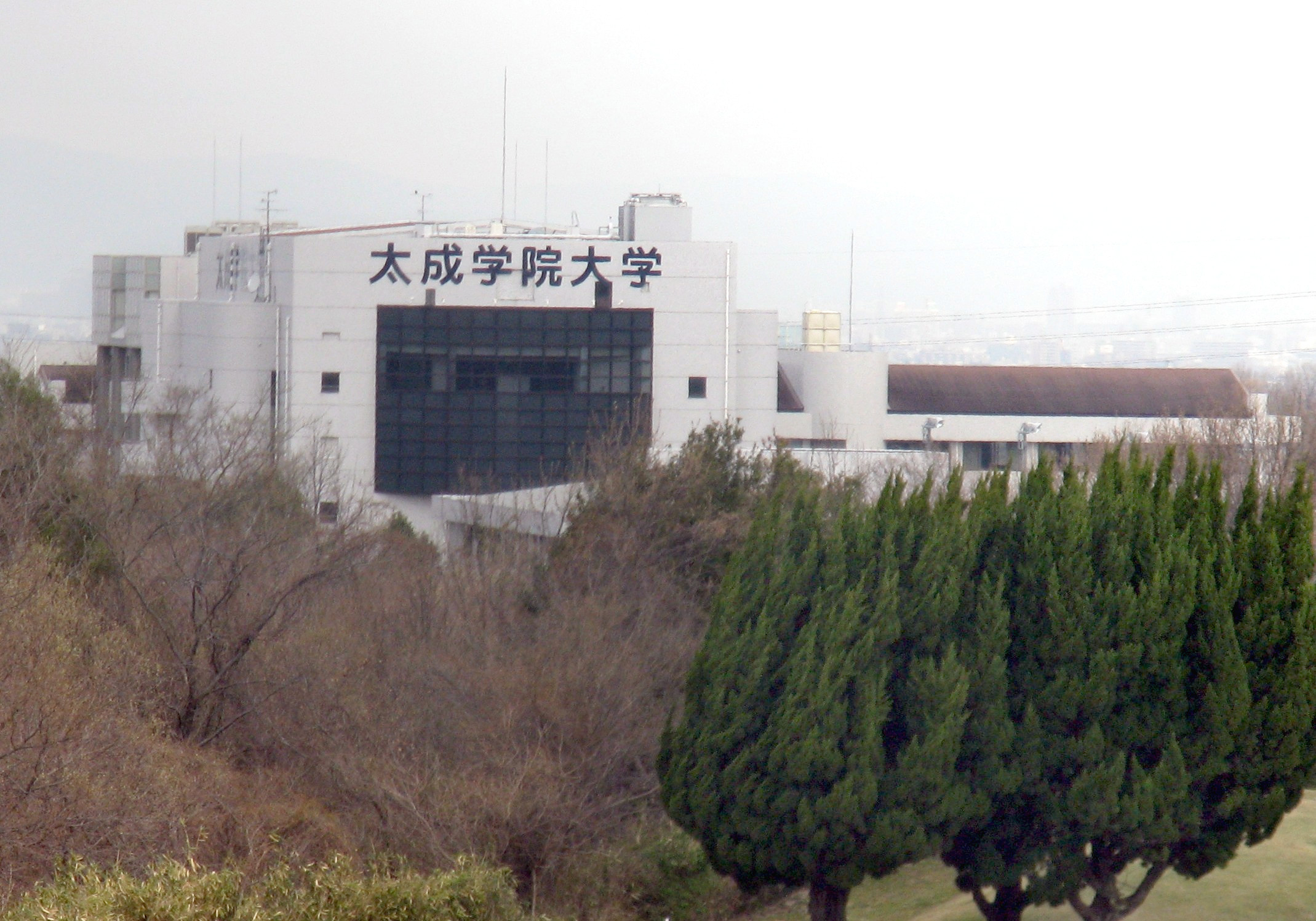
Taisei Gakuin University

Taisei Gakuin University (太成学院大学, Taisei gakuin daigaku) is a private university in Sakai, Osaka, Japan. The predecessor of the school was founded in 1916, and it was chartered as a junior college in 1987. The school became a four-year college in 1998 and adopted the present name in 2003.
