= 2012 Nippon Professional Baseball season =

2012 NPB season
- League: Nippon Professional Baseball
- Sport: Baseball
- Duration: March 30 – November 3

Central League pennant
- League champions: Yomiuri Giants
- Runners-up: Chunichi Dragons
- Season MVP: Shinnosuke Abe (Yomiuri)

Pacific League pennant
- League champions: Hokkaido Nippon-Ham Fighters
- Runners-up: Saitama Seibu Lions
- Season MVP: Mitsuo Yoshikawa (Nippon Ham)

Climax Series
- CL champions: Yomiuri Giants
- CL runners-up: Chunichi Dragons
- PL champions: Hokkaido Nippon-Ham Fighters
- PL runners-up: Fukuoka SoftBank Hawks

Japan Series
- Venue: Sapporo Dome, Sapporo, Hokkaidō; Tokyo Dome, Bunkyō, Tokyo
- Champions: Yomiuri Giants
- Runners-up: Hokkaido Nippon-Ham Fighters
- Finals MVP: Tetsuya Utsumi (Yomiuri)

NPB seasons
- ← 2011 2013 →

The 2012 Nippon Professional Baseball season was the 63rd season since the NPB was reorganized in 1950.

== Regular season standings ==
Central League regular season standings
Team	G	W	L	T	Pct.	GB
Yomiuri Giants	144	86	43	15	.667	—
Chunichi Dragons	144	75	53	16	.586	10.5
Tokyo Yakult Swallows	144	68	65	11	.511	20.0
Hiroshima Toyo Carp	144	61	71	12	.462	26.5
Hanshin Tigers	144	55	75	14	.423	31.5
Yokohama DeNA BayStars	144	46	85	13	.351	41.0

Pacific League regular season standings
Team	G	W	L	T	Pct.	GB
Hokkaido Nippon-Ham Fighters	144	74	59	11	.556	—
Saitama Seibu Lions	144	72	63	9	.533	3.0
Fukuoka SoftBank Hawks	144	67	65	12	.508	6.5
Tohoku Rakuten Golden Eagles	144	67	67	10	.500	7.5
Chiba Lotte Marines	144	62	67	15	.481	10.0
Orix Buffaloes	144	57	77	10	.425	17.5

== Climax Series ==
Note: All of the games that are played in the first two rounds of the Climax Series are held at the higher seed's home stadium. The team with the higher regular-season standing also advances if the round ends in a tie.

First stage
Central League
2	Chunichi Dragons	2
3	Tokyo Yakult Swallows	1
Pacific League
2	Saitama Seibu Lions	1
3	Fukuoka SoftBank Hawks	2

Final stage
1	Yomiuri Giants	4
2	Chunichi Dragons	3
1	Hokkaido Nippon-Ham Fighters	4
3	Fukuoka SoftBank Hawks	0

Japan Series
CL1	Yomiuri Giants	4
PL1	Hokkaido Nippon-Ham Fighters	2

=== First stage ===
The regular season league champions, the Hokkaido Nippon-Ham Fighters (PL) and the Yomiuri Giants (CL), received byes to the championship round.

==== Central League ====
Chunichi Dragons (2) vs. Tokyo Yakult Swallows (1)

Game	Date	Score	Location	Time	Attendance
1	October 13	Tokyo Yakult Swallows – 1, Chunichi Dragons – 6	Nagoya Dome	3:11	31,146
2	October 14	Tokyo Yakult Swallows – 1, Chunichi Dragons – 0	Nagoya Dome	3:26	33,852
3	October 15	Tokyo Yakult Swallows – 1, Chunichi Dragons – 4	Nagoya Dome	3:39	23,264

==== Pacific League ====
Fukuoka SoftBank Hawks (2) vs. Saitama Seibu Lions (1)

Game	Date	Score	Location	Time	Attendance
1	October 13	Fukuoka SoftBank Hawks – 2, Saitama Seibu Lions – 1	Seibu Dome	2:54	32,074
2	October 14	Fukuoka SoftBank Hawks – 0, Saitama Seibu Lions – 8	Seibu Dome	3:23	33,918
3	October 15	Fukuoka SoftBank Hawks – 3, Saitama Seibu Lions – 2	Seibu Dome	3:23	25,002

=== Final stage ===
The regular season league champions, the Hokkaido Nippon-Ham Fighters (PL) and the Yomiuri Giants (CL), received a one-game advantage.

==== Central League ====
Yomiuri Giants (4) vs. Chunichi Dragons (3)

Game	Date	Score	Location	Time	Attendance
1	October 17	Chunichi Dragons – 3, Yomiuri Giants – 1	Tokyo Dome	3:21	40,039
2	October 18	Chunichi Dragons – 5, Yomiuri Giants – 2	Tokyo Dome	3:40	39,135
3	October 19	Chunichi Dragons – 5, Yomiuri Giants – 4	Tokyo Dome	3:41	44,744
4	October 20	Chunichi Dragons – 1, Yomiuri Giants – 3	Tokyo Dome	2:57	46,158
5	October 21	Chunichi Dragons – 2, Yomiuri Giants – 3	Tokyo Dome	3:40	45,897
6	October 22	Chunichi Dragons – 2, Yomiuri Giants – 4	Tokyo Dome	3:18	44,351

==== Pacific League ====
Hokkaido Nippon-Ham Fighters (4) vs. Fukuoka SoftBank Hawks (0)

Game	Date	Score	Location	Time	Attendance
1	October 17	Fukuoka SoftBank Hawks – 2, Hokkaido Nippon-Ham Fighters – 3	Sapporo Dome	2:56	31,022
2	October 18	Fukuoka SoftBank Hawks – 0, Hokkaido Nippon-Ham Fighters – 3	Sapporo Dome	3:17	23,610
3	October 19	Fukuoka SoftBank Hawks – 2, Hokkaido Nippon-Ham Fighters – 4	Sapporo Dome	3:16	37,166

== Japan Series ==
CL Yomiuri Giants (4) vs. PL Hokkaido Nippon-Ham Fighters (2)

Game	Date	Score	Location	Time	Attendance
1	October 27	Hokkaido Nippon-Ham Fighters – 1, Yomiuri Giants – 8	Tokyo Dome	3:13	44,981
2	October 28	Hokkaido Nippon-Ham Fighters – 0, Yomiuri Giants – 1	Tokyo Dome	2:51	44,932
3	October 30	Yomiuri Giants – 3, Hokkaido Nippon-Ham Fighters – 7	Sapporo Dome	4:04	36,942
4	October 31	Yomiuri Giants – 0, Hokkaido Nippon-Ham Fighters – 1	Sapporo Dome	4:15	40,433
5	November 1	Yomiuri Giants – 10, Hokkaido Nippon-Ham Fighters – 2	Sapporo Dome	3:52	40,579
6	November 3	Hokkaido Nippon-Ham Fighters – 3, Yomiuri Giants – 4	Tokyo Dome	3:22	45,018

== League leaders ==
=== Central League ===
Batting leaders
Stat	Player	Team	Total
Batting average	Shinnosuke Abe	Yomiuri Giants	.340
Home runs	Wladimir Balentien	Tokyo Yakult Swallows	31
Runs batted in	Shinnosuke Abe	Yomiuri Giants	104
Runs	Hayato Sakamoto	Yomiuri Giants	87
Hits	Hayato Sakamoto; Hisayoshi Chono	Yomiuri Giants; Yomiuri Giants	173
Stolen bases	Yohei Oshima	Chunichi Dragons	32

Pitching leaders
Stat	Player	Team	Total
Wins	Tetsuya Utsumi	Yomiuri Giants	15
Losses	Bryan Bullington; Minoru Iwata	Hiroshima Toyo Carp; Hanshin Tigers	14
Earned run average	Kenta Maeda	Hiroshima Toyo Carp	1.53
Strikeouts	Toshiya Sugiuchi; Atsushi Nomi	Yomiuri Giants; Hanshin Tigers	172
Innings pitched	Kenta Maeda	Hiroshima Toyo Carp	206 1/3
Saves	Tony Barnette; Hitoki Iwase	Tokyo Yakult Swallows; Chunichi Dragons	33

=== Pacific League ===
Batting leaders
Stat	Player	Team	Total
Batting average	Katsuya Kakunaka	Chiba Lotte Marines	.312
Home runs	Takeya Nakamura	Saitama Seibu Lions	27
Runs batted in	Lee Dae-Ho	Orix Buffaloes	91
Runs	Sho Nakata	Hokkaido Nippon-Ham Fighters	79
Hits	Seiichi Uchikawa	Fukuoka SoftBank Hawks	157
Stolen bases	Ryo Hijirisawa	Tohoku Rakuten Golden Eagles	54

Pitching leaders
Stat	Player	Team	Total
Wins	Tadashi Settsu	Fukuoka SoftBank Hawks	17
Losses	Takayuki Kishi	Saitama Seibu Lions	12
Earned run average	Mitsuo Yoshikawa	Hokkaido Nippon-Ham Fighters	1.71
Strikeouts	Masahiro Tanaka	Tohoku Rakuten Golden Eagles	169
Innings pitched	Yoshihisa Naruse	Chiba Lotte Marines	200 2/3
Saves	Hisashi Takeda	Hokkaido Nippon-Ham Fighters	32

== See also ==
- 2012 Korea Professional Baseball season
- 2012 Major League Baseball season
