= Chiben Gakuen =

Private academic institution in Japan

Chiben Gakuen (智辯学園) is a private academic institution with campuses in Nara Prefecture and Wakayama Prefecture, Japan. The school sends many students to the best universities and colleges in Japan, including the University of Tokyo, Kyoto University and other public and private schools.

The school is well known in Japan for its baseball team, which usually participates in and frequently wins the Koshien Tournament for high school baseball.

== Student exchange programs ==
Chiben Gakuen Wakayama participates in student exchange programs with:

- St Leonard's College in Melbourne, Victoria (Australia), and
- Thomas Jefferson High School for Science and Technology in Alexandria, Virginia.

Chiben Gakuen Nara participates in a student exchange program with：

- Exeter High School in Exeter, New Hampshire, and
- Troy High School in Troy, Michigan.
- Thomas Jefferson High Schoolin Denver, Colorado.

The school celebrated the 20th anniversary of its exchange program with St Leonards College in November 2007, and with Thomas Jefferson in 2013.

== Notable alumni of Chiben Gakuen Junior & Senior High School ==
=== Baseball players ===
- Nobuhiro Takashiro
- Masahiro Tanaka
- Takahiro Shoda
- Masato Nakamura
- Taichi Okazaki
- Ryuichi Kajimae
- Shintaro Masuda
- Kazuma Okamoto
- Taishi Hirooka
- Ryuya Matsumoto

=== Others ===
- Daniel Kahl, (exchange student), gaijin tarento

== Notable alumni of Chiben Gakuen Wakayama ==
=== Baseball players ===
- Jin Nakatani
- Shinichi Takeuchi
- Toshiya Okada
- Haruki Nishikawa
- Fumiya Kurokawa

=== Others ===
- Tatsuya Tanimoto, politician

== See also ==
- List of schools in Japan
- Chiben Gakuen Wakayama (Japanese Wikipedia)
