= Nori Aoki =

Japanese baseball player (born 1982)

Norichika Aoki 青木 宣親
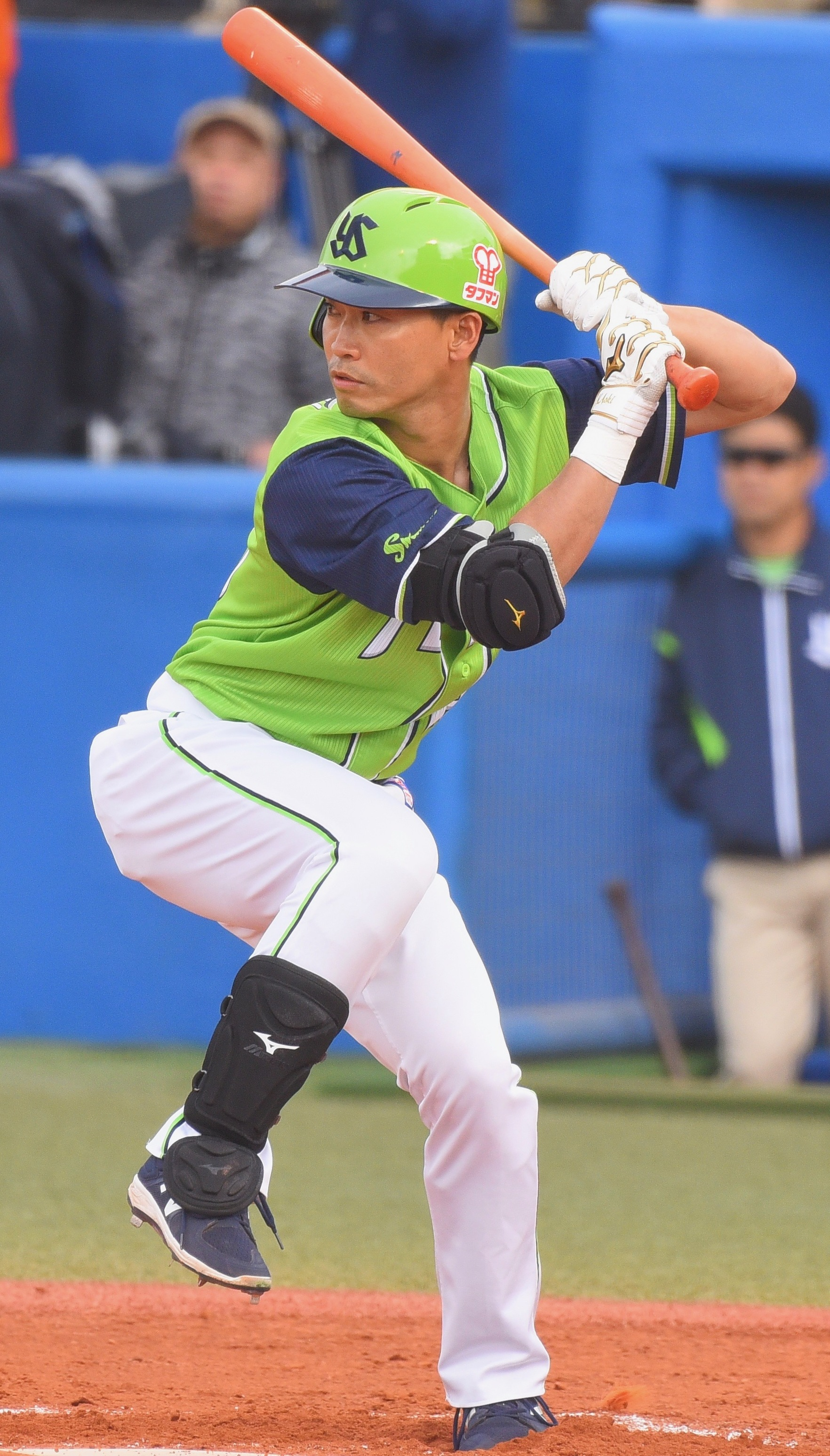
- Aoki with the Tokyo Yakult Swallows in 2018
- Outfielder
- Born: January 5, 1982 (age 44); Hyūga, Miyazaki, Japan
- Batted: Left Threw: Right

Professional debut
- NPB: July 17, 2004, for the Yakult Swallows
- MLB: April 6, 2012, for the Milwaukee Brewers

Last appearance
- NPB: October 5, 2024, for the Tokyo Yakult Swallows
- MLB: October 1, 2017, for the New York Mets

NPB statistics
- Batting average: .313
- Hits: 1,956
- Home runs: 145
- Runs batted in: 667
- Stolen bases: 177

MLB statistics
- Batting average: .285
- Hits: 774
- Home runs: 33
- Runs batted in: 219
- Stolen bases: 98
- Stats at Baseball Reference

Teams
- Yakult Swallows/Tokyo Yakult Swallows (2004–2011); Milwaukee Brewers (2012–2013); Kansas City Royals (2014); San Francisco Giants (2015); Seattle Mariners (2016); Houston Astros (2017); Toronto Blue Jays (2017); New York Mets (2017); Tokyo Yakult Swallows (2018–2024)

Career highlights and awards
- NPB: Japan Series Champion (2021); 8× All-Star (2005–2011, 2018); 7× Best Nine Award (2005–2011); 7× Mitsui Golden Glove Award (2006–2011, 2020); 3× CL batting champion (2005, 2007, 2010); 2× NPB All-Star Game MVP (2006 Game 1, 2009 Game 1); CL Rookie of the Year 2005; CL stolen base leader (2006); Meikyukai (2017); NPB record: .328 lifetime NPB batting average (highest among qualified batters); International: All-World Baseball Classic Team (2009)
Medals
Men's baseball
Representing Japan
World Baseball Classic
Gold medal – first place	2006 San Diego	Team
Gold medal – first place	2009 Los Angeles	Team
Bronze medal – third place	2017 Los Angeles	Team

Norichika Aoki (青木 宣親, Aoki Norichika; born January 5, 1982) is a Japanese former professional baseball outfielder. He played in Major League Baseball (MLB) for the Milwaukee Brewers, Kansas City Royals, San Francisco Giants, Seattle Mariners, Houston Astros, Toronto Blue Jays, and New York Mets and in Nippon Professional Baseball (NPB) for the Tokyo Yakult Swallows.

Aoki is one of only six players, alongside Ichiro Suzuki, Matt Murton, Alex Ramirez, Tsuyoshi Nishioka, and Shogo Akiyama, to amass 200 or more hits in a single season in Japanese professional baseball and the only individual to do so in two separate seasons. He played in the 2006, 2009, and 2017 World Baseball Classics as well as the 2008 Summer Olympics.

== Early life and amateur career ==
Aoki was born in Hyūga, Miyazaki, and attended Hyuga Municipal Hichiya Elementary School and Tomishima Junior High School before going on to Miyazaki Prefectural Hyuga High School. He was a pitcher throughout junior high and high school, converting to the outfield only upon entering Waseda University, where he majored in human sciences.

Aoki was surrounded by a remarkable concentration of talent at Waseda: his year included shortstop Takashi Toritani, third baseman Toshimitsu Higa, and center fielder Shintaro Yoshida, all three of whom would later go on to the pros. Left-handed pitcher Tsuyoshi Wada was one year his senior, and second baseman Hiroyasu Tanaka and first baseman Shinichi Takeuchi, both of whom would later rejoin Aoki with the Swallows, were one and two years his junior, respectively.

The six hitters, who often batted in the order of Tanaka, Aoki, Toritani, Higa, Takeuchi and Yoshida, formed one of the most potent lineups in college baseball history and led Waseda to four consecutive Tokyo Big6 titles for the first time in university history. Aoki hit .463 in the spring of his junior year (2002) and set a Tokyo Big6 record for runs scored in a single game, with six against the University of Tokyo, going 5-for-5 with five RBI and a walk in that game. He hit .332 during his college career, albeit without a single home run, and was selected to the Tokyo Big6 Best Nine Award three times in his eight seasons (spring and fall) with Waseda as the starting right fielder. He was selected in the fourth round of the 2003 NPB draft by the Yakult Swallows.

== Professional career ==
Aoki's hits by year. Aoki attained 2,000 career hits on June 11, 2017.

=== Yakult Swallows ===
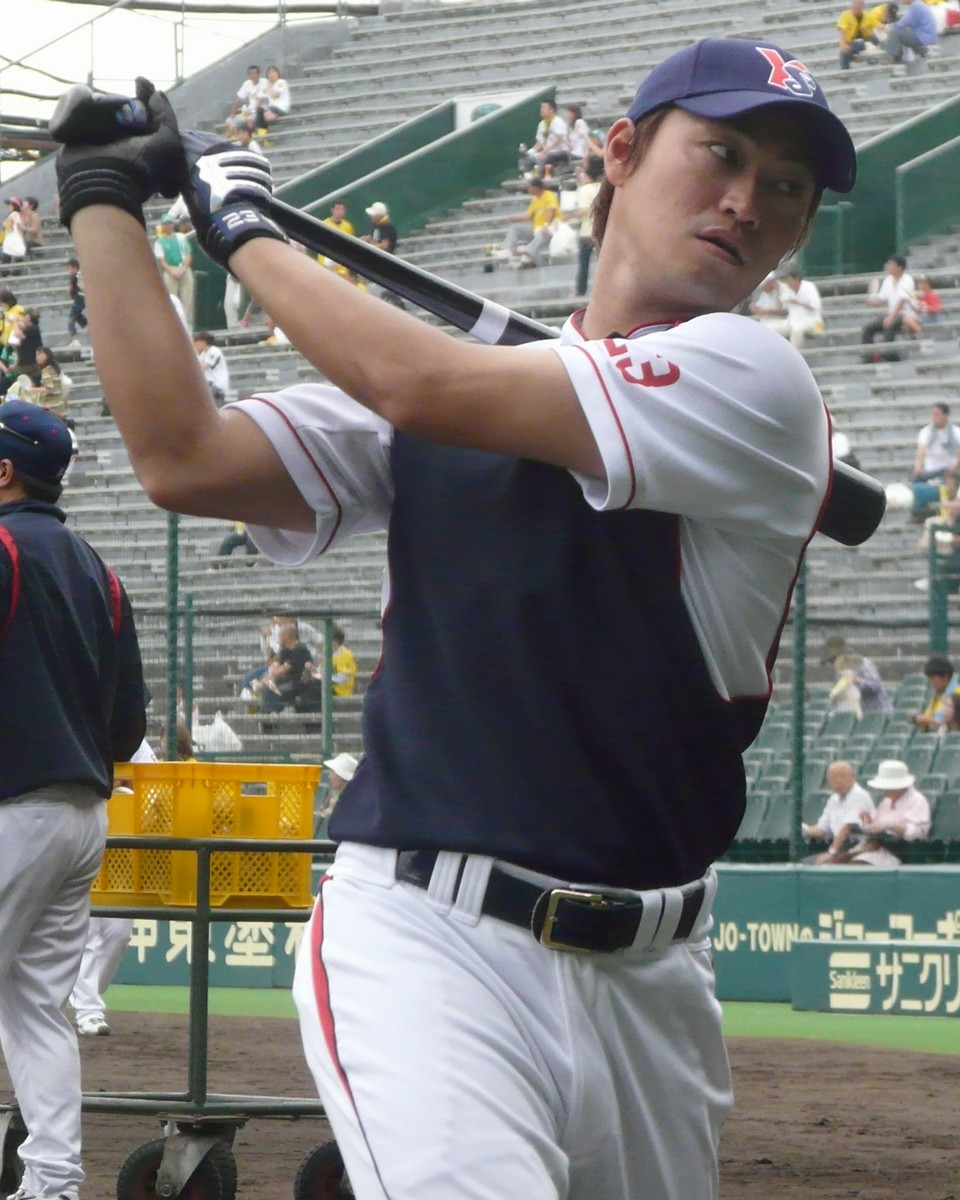
Aoki with the Swallows in 2008

In 2004, Aoki saw little playing time in his rookie season (2004), playing just 10 games at the ichigun (Japanese equivalent of "major league") level. However, he showed signs of promise in the minors, hitting .372 and leading the Eastern League in both batting average and on-base percentage (.436) and coming second in stolen bases (21). In the Fresh All-Star Game (the Japanese equivalent of the All-Star Futures Game) held that year, Aoki went 4-for-5, coming a home run short of the cycle and winning Most Valuable Player honors for the game.

In 2005, Aoki enjoyed a breakout year, earning the job of starting center fielder with the departure of Atsunori Inaba. While he struggled in the opening weeks of the season as the Swallows' No. 2 hitter, striking out uncharacteristically often, he slowly began to collect hits at his usual pace and was promoted to the leadoff role by June 2005. On October 6, 2005, he tied the Central League single-season hit record of 192 (set by Robert Rose in 1999), following up the feat by becoming the second player in NPB history (after Ichiro Suzuki) to record 200 hits in a single season, on October 11, 2005.

While Aoki missed Suzuki's NPB record for hits in a single season of 210, he finished with a league-record 202 hits (his 169 singles were an NPB single-season record). He led all Central League players in batting average (.344) and hits, and was voted the league Most Valuable Rookie.

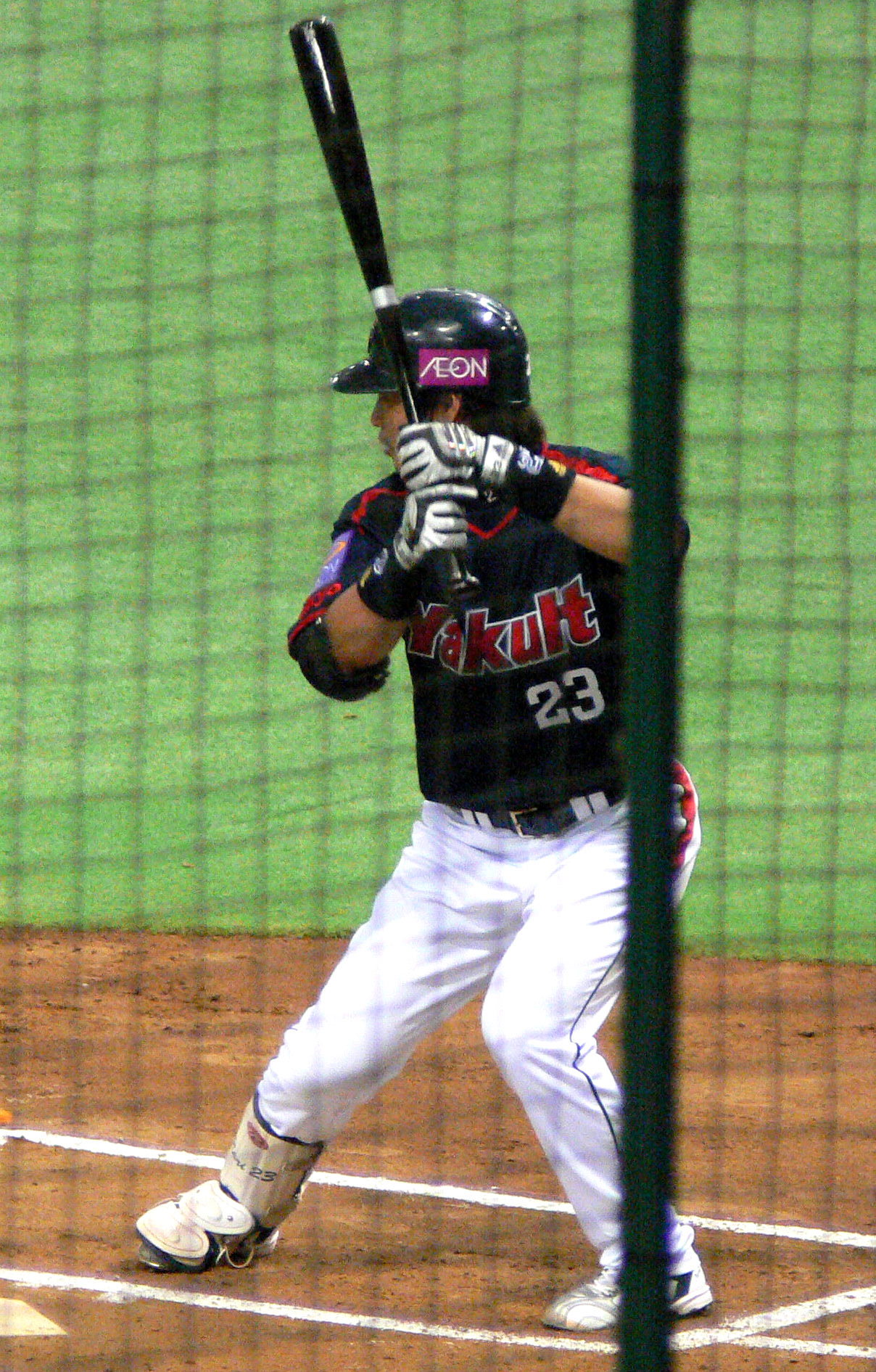
Aoki with the Swallows

In 2006, Aoki was chosen to play in the inaugural World Baseball Classic as a member of the Japanese national team in 2006. He made his second All-Star appearance in July 2006 and was named the Most Valuable Player in Game 1 (held at his home park, Meiji Jingu Stadium), becoming the fourth player in NPB history to win both Fresh All-Star Game and All-Star Game MVP honors.

Though he came up short in his goal of reaching 200 base hits and winning the batting title for the second consecutive year, Aoki finished the season with 192 hits, leading both the Central and Pacific leagues. He cut down on his strikeouts and drew more walks than in the previous season, improving his on-base percentage from .387 to .396 despite a lower batting average. He also hit more home runs (13) and drove in more runs (62), leading the league in both average with runners in scoring position (.399) and stolen bases (41) for the first time (and putting an end to Tiger center fielder Norihiro Akahoshi's five-year streak of leading the Central League in that category).

On December 25, 2006, Aoki publicly stated his intent to eventually play in the major leagues via the posting system, saying, "…I would like to move to the majors after some years. It might be difficult to do so as a free agent since I'll be over 30 by then." While major league teams expressed interest in Aoki (especially after seeing him in international play), the Swallows offered no indication of their willingness to comply with the request.

In 2007, Aoki and teammate and fellow outfielder Alex Ramírez competed for the batting title at a torrid pace throughout the 2007 season. On July 10, 2007, Aoki became the fastest player in Japanese professional baseball history to amass 500 career hits, doing so in 373 games. While he fell short of 200 base hits, partly due to the 80 walks (fourth in the league) that opposing pitchers issued to him, he finished second in the league in hits (to Ramírez, who hit safely 204 times, a new Central League record) with 193, winning his second batting title with a .346 average. Aoki also led the league in on-base percentage for the first time and scored 114 runs (his third consecutive season with 100 or more runs).

Meanwhile, his stolen base total dropped sharply from 41 to 17, a decline that could be attributed to then-player-manager Atsuya Furuta's placing Hiroyasu Tanaka (rather than Adam Riggs, as was the case in 2006), a second baseman with little power, behind Aoki in the 2-hole and instructing him to bunt often. On the other hand, Aoki began to show legitimate power, hitting 20 home runs and slugged over .500 for the first time. He was slotted into both the 2- and 3-hole numerous times and even hit cleanup in Furuta's retirement game as a player on October 7, 2007.

Aoki played in the Asian Baseball Championship as a member of the Japanese national team in December 2007, helping Japan clinch a berth in the upcoming Beijing Olympics.

On May 5, 2008, Aoki was scratched from the lineup and sent down to the minors due to an oblique strain. It was his first time missing playing time due to injury since his debut at the ichigun level. However, he returned some three weeks later on May 29, 2008, engaging in another race for the batting title, this time with Yokohama BayStars left fielder Seiichi Uchikawa.

In August 2008, Aoki was chosen to play in the 2008 Beijing Olympics along with teammate Shinya Miyamoto as a member of the Japanese national team. After he returned to the Swallows, manager Shigeru Takada opted to use him in the 3-hole permanently, slotting newly acquired left fielder Kazuki Fukuchi into the leadoff role instead. While Aoki relinquished the league lead in both batting average and on-base percentage to Uchikawa, he finished the season with a personal-best batting average of .347, striking out just 47 times (fewest in the league among qualifying players) and swiping 31 bases (second to Fukuchi on the Swallows).

In 2009, Though he hit well in the second World Baseball Classic, Aoki struggled in the opening weeks of the 2009 season, hitting just .233 with a .316 on-base percentage in April 2009. He got hit in the head by a pitch thrown by Chunichi Dragons closer Hitoki Iwase on April 30, 2009, but was found to have no serious injuries upon diagnosis.

=== Milwaukee Brewers ===
The Swallows posted Aoki to Major League Baseball in the 2011–12 offseason. The Milwaukee Brewers won the posting and signed Aoki in January 2012 to a two-year contract with a third-year option. He became the team's first Japanese player to be acquired through this process. Kosuke Inaji served as Aoki's interpreter throughout the season.

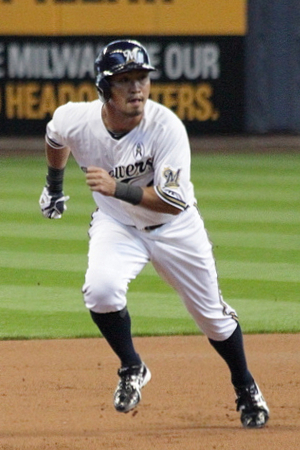
Aoki with the Milwaukee Brewers in 2013

Aoki's playing time greatly increased over the course of the season due to his fine play and the injuries sustained by many starters. In his first full season with Milwaukee, Aoki hit .288/.355/.433 with 10 home runs (one inside the park), 50 RBIs, and 81 runs scored in 520 at-bats, plus 30 stolen bases. By the latter half of the season, he was batting primarily in the leadoff position for the Brewers. Aoki also set the record for doubles in a single season (37) by a Brewers rookie.

On June 7, 2012, in a game against the Chicago Cubs, Aoki hit his first out of the park home run in his MLB career. He then hit a second home run in the bottom of the tenth inning, breaking a 3–3 tie. It was his first career walk-off, and his first career multi-home run game. During the later portion of the season, Aoki has started to become a spark plug for the Brewers. He made great defensive plays and got big hits when they were needed, including a 2-out, 2-strike, 2-run home run on September 9, 2012, against St. Louis to tie the game and send it to extra innings. This game was needed by the Brewers to help push them toward a possible Wild Card berth.

On June 24, 2012, Aoki collected 3 hits and 4 stolen bases against the Chicago White Sox. The 4 stolen bases tied the Brewers franchise record.

In 151 games in 2012, he hit .288 with 10 home runs, 50 RBI, 37 doubles, 30 stolen bases (9th in the NL), and 43 walks, giving him a .355 on-base percentage. He finished 5th in the NL Rookie of the Year voting.

Aoki was the Brewers Opening Day right fielder and leadoff hitter in 2013, and Logan Schafer was his main backup. In May 2013, he hit .343 with 6 RBI, bringing his season average to .299. After that, he had a steady decline until September 2013, when he hit .297 with 6 RBI and 15 walks. In 155 games, he hit .286 with 8 home runs, 37 RBI, 20 stolen bases and 55 walks, giving him a .356 on-base percentage.

=== Kansas City Royals ===
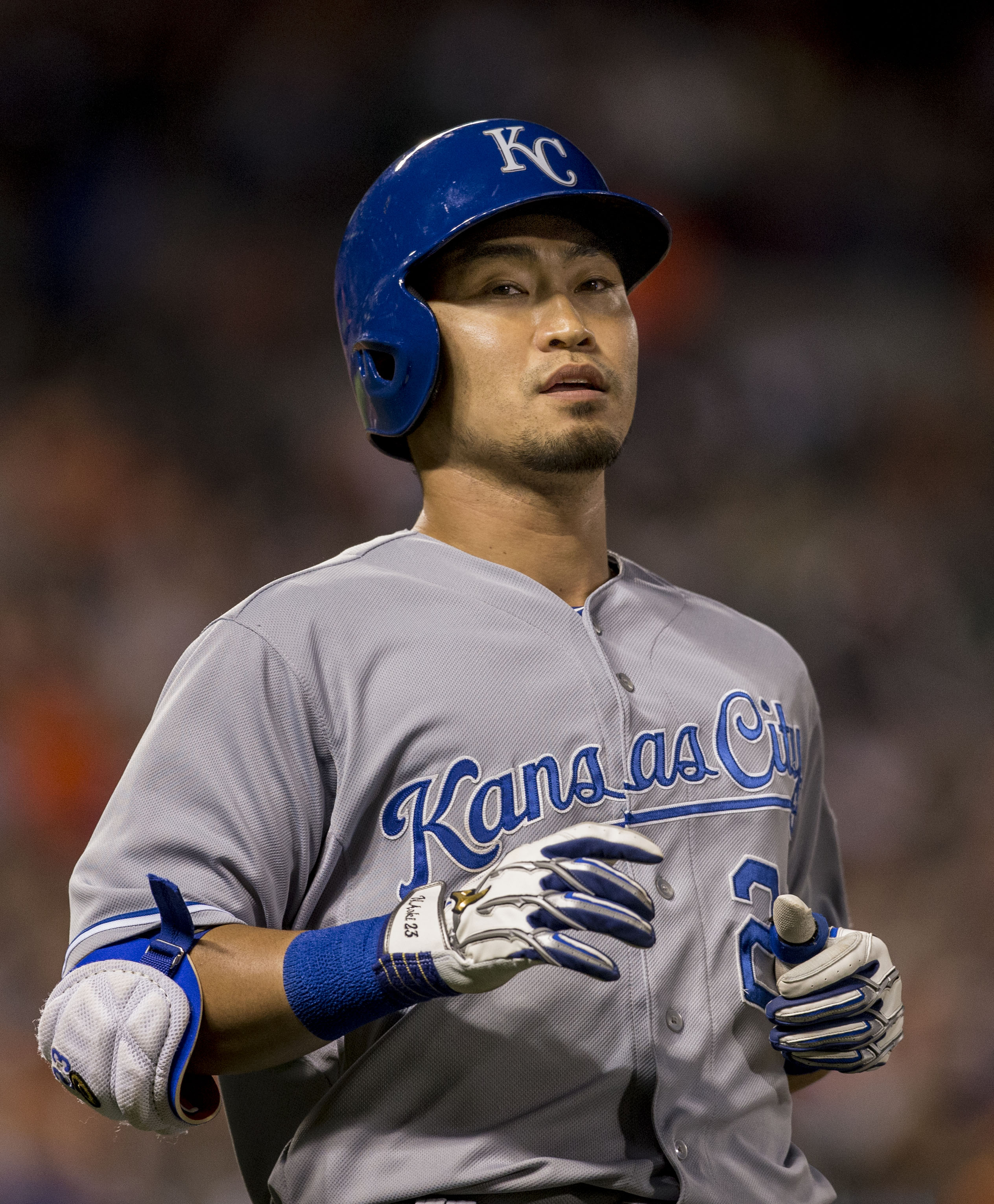
Aoki with the Royals in 2014

On December 5, 2013, the Brewers traded Aoki to the Kansas City Royals for Will Smith. Aoki batted leadoff for the Royals for much of the 2014 season. For the season, he batted .285/.349/.360, in 491 at bats.

On August 6, 2014, in a game against the Arizona Diamondbacks, Aoki hit a grand slam in the fifth inning off of relief pitcher Bo Schultz. This was his first career grand slam, as well as his first (and only) homer with the Royals. Aoki also set a Royals franchise record, which was the most hits in a three-game series. He collected a total of 11 hits against the Chicago White Sox at Kauffman Stadium, passing Willie Wilson and George Brett's former record of 10 hits.

Aoki made his first postseason appearance as an MLB player with the Royals that year as they made the first Wild Card spot to host the 2014 American League Wild Card Game against the Oakland Athletics. He scored the first run for the Royals after advancing on a force-out in the first inning that saw him steal second base and then advance on an RBI single. In a see-saw affair that saw the Royals go from leading 3–2 after three innings to trailing 7-3 leading into the eighth inning, Aoki proved key in the comeback. With a runner on third base and one out in the ninth after the Royals battled to trail 7–6, he hit a flyball deep enough in right field to score Jarrod Dyson to send the game into extras. Aoki was taken out of right field as the tenth started, but the Royals would win 9–8 in the twelfth inning, which was the first playoff victory for the Royals in 29 years. Aoki had just two further RBIs in the ensuing postseason run, which saw him play right field for the run to the American League pennant and most of the 2014 World Series. In total, Aoki batted .195 as the Royals lost in the Series in seven games.

=== San Francisco Giants ===
On January 19, 2015, Aoki signed a one-year deal with the San Francisco Giants. On May 3, 2015, in a 5–0 win over the Los Angeles Angels of Anaheim, Aoki led off the first inning with a solo home run against pitcher Jered Weaver. Following Aoki was teammate Joe Panik batting second, who homered as well. It was the first time since 1964 that the Giants had opened a game with consecutive home runs.

On June 20, 2015, Aoki was hit by a pitch from Dodger Carlos Frias, breaking his right fibula and putting him on the disabled list, resulting in him missing 28 games. At the time he was batting .317 and was a potential All-Star, leading the league in several offensive categories. Two weeks after his return on July 27, 2015, he was again hit by a pitch, this time in the batting helmet by Chicago Cubs pitcher Jake Arrieta. He went on the 7-day concussion list, missing another seven games.

In 2015, he batted .287/.353/.380 in 355 at bats, and led the Giants with 14 stolen bases. After the 2015 season, the Giants declined Aoki's option, making him a free agent.

=== Seattle Mariners ===
On December 3, 2015, Aoki signed a one-year, $5.5 million contract with the Seattle Mariners. In 2016, Aoki played in 118 games for the Mariners, slashing .283/.349/.388 with four home runs, 28 RBI, and seven stolen bases in 417 at-bats.

=== Houston Astros ===
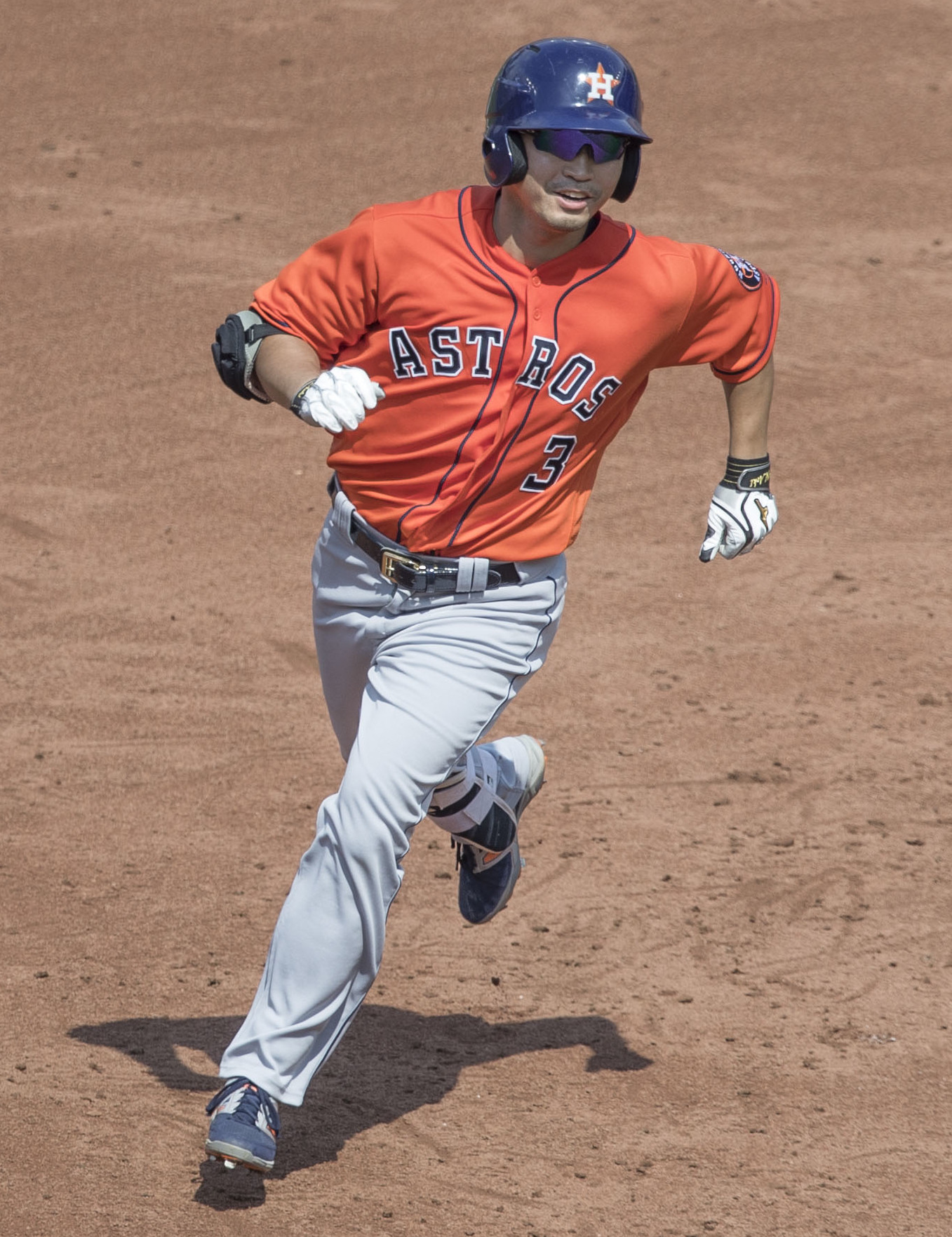
Aoki with the Astros in 2017

The Houston Astros claimed Aoki off waivers from the Mariners on November 3, 2016.

On June 11, 2017, Aoki recorded his 2000th career professional hit against the Los Angeles Angels of Anaheim. This includes hits in NPB and MLB. While he was traded before the Astros' World Series championship run in 2017, he was awarded a World Series ring by the team by virtue of playing 70 games for them in 2017.

=== Toronto Blue Jays ===
On July 31, 2017, the Astros traded Aoki and Teoscar Hernández to the Toronto Blue Jays in exchange for Francisco Liriano. In 12 games for Toronto, he went 9-for-32 (.281) with 3 home runs and 8 RBI. Aoki was designated for assignment by the Blue Jays on August 28, and released the following day.

=== New York Mets ===
On September 2, 2017, the New York Mets signed Aoki to a major league contract. In 27 appearances for New York, he batted .284/.371/.373 with eight RBI and five stolen bases. On October 30, Aoki was released by the Mets.

=== Tokyo Yakult Swallows (second stint) ===
On January 30, 2018, Aoki signed a three-year deal to return to the Tokyo Yakult Swallows, where he spent the first eight years of his professional career. In early May, 2018, Aoki recorded his 4,000th at-bat in NPB. With a .328 career batting average to that point, he then qualified as NPB's lifetime batting champion. He was selected for the 2018 NPB All-Star game.

Aoki made 72 appearances for the Swallows in 2024, slashing .229/.287/.271 with no home runs, nine RBI, and two stolen bases. On September 14, 2024, Aoki announced he would retire at season's end.

== International career ==
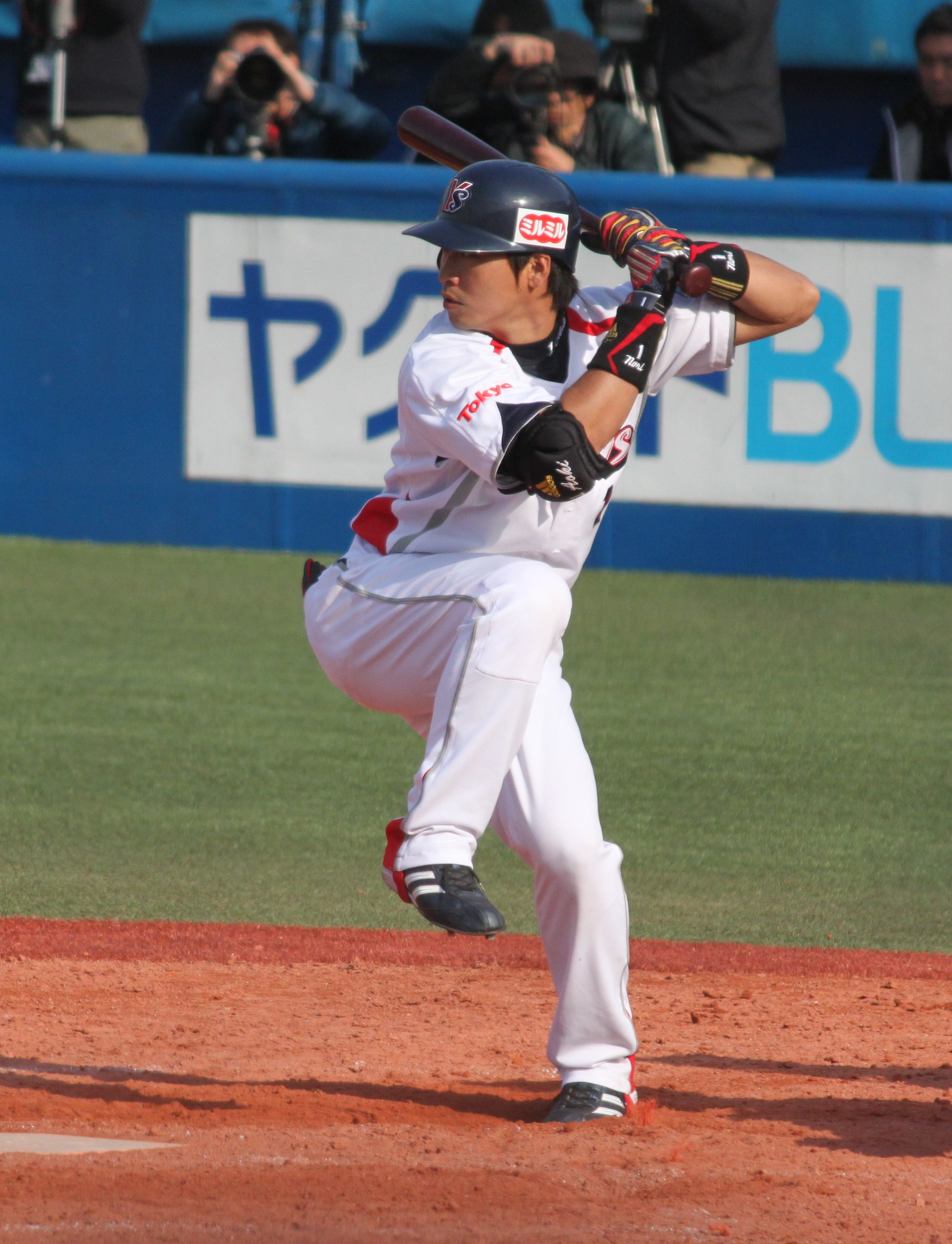
Aoki in 2010

=== 2006 World Baseball Classic ===
Aoki was named to the Japan national team for the first time in early 2006 for the inaugural World Baseball Classic. After being relegated to the bench and seeing little playing time in the first two rounds, he was named the starting center fielder in the semi-finals against South Korea and finals against Cuba, but went 0-for-4 in those two games and finished with just one hit in five at-bats in the tournament. Nevertheless, Japan defeated Cuba 10–6 in the finals to become the first tournament champions.

=== 2007 Asian Baseball Championship ===
Aoki played in the 2007 Asian Baseball Championship (which also functioned as the Asian qualifying tournament for the 2008 Summer Olympics) for Japan. Though he was 0-for-9 with one sacrifice bunt in the first two games against the Philippines and South Korea as Japan's No. 3 hitter, he went 3-for-4 with a double and a walk in a 10–2 mercy rule win in the final game against Taiwan, helping Japan clinch a berth in the upcoming Olympics.

=== 2008 Summer Olympics ===
Aoki played in all nine games in the 2008 Summer Olympics in Beijing as Japan's starting center fielder, batting in each of the first three spots in the order and hitting .294 (10-for-34) with seven RBI and scoring five runs. Japan lost in the semi-finals against South Korea. Despite a go-ahead, three-run home run by Aoki in the third inning of the bronze medal match against the United States, Japan went on to lose 8–4 in a disappointing fourth-place finish behind South Korea, Cuba, and the U.S.

=== 2009 World Baseball Classic ===
Aoki played in the World Baseball Classic for the second time in 2009, having no difficulty playing left field despite manning center field almost exclusively for the Swallows. He played in all nine games, hitting .324 with seven RBI as Japan's No. 3 hitter, and had a pivotal role in Japan's repeat as tournament champions. Aoki was named to the All-Tournament team as an outfielder.

=== 2017 World Baseball Classic ===
Aoki played center field for Japan in the 2017 World Baseball Classic. The team finished third.

== Hitting style ==
Aoki has developed more power with each successive season and has now established himself as a legitimate middle-of-the-order threat that can pull the ball as well as hit for a high average (.333 career batting average as of May 13, 2009).

== Personal life ==
Aoki is married to former Japanese broadcaster Sachi Ohtake, with whom he has two children.
