= Tokyo Big6 Baseball League =

Japanese college baseball conference

- Sport: Baseball
- First season: 1914
- Commissioner: Akio Kaneko
- Headquarters: Tokyo, Japan
- Region: Kantō, Japan
- Most recent champions: Waseda University (49th title)
- Most titles: Waseda University (49 titles)
- Broadcasters: Sports Bull, Abema, NHK
- Website: Big6.gr.jp

Locations
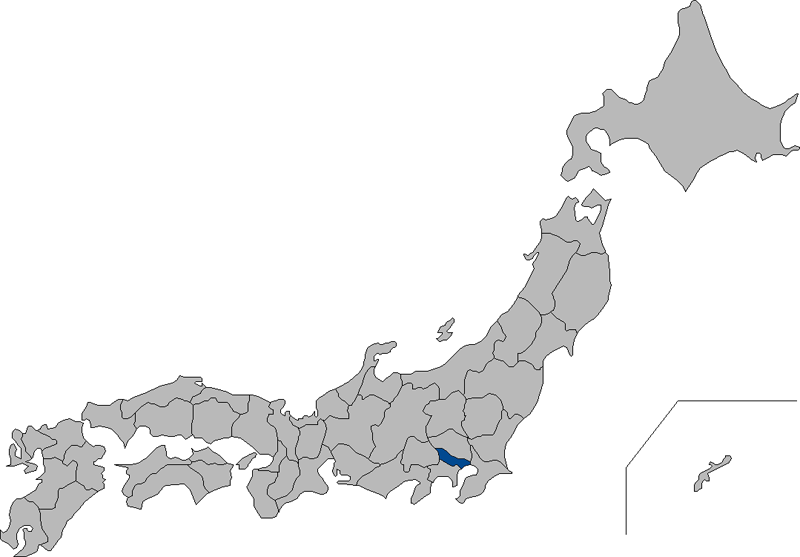

The Tokyo Big6 Baseball League (東京六大学野球連盟, Tōkyō roku daigaku yakyū renmei) (Note: lit. Tokyo Six Universities Baseball Federation) is an intercollegiate baseball conference that features six prominent universities in the Tokyo area. It is the oldest collegiate baseball conference in Japan and the oldest baseball league overall in Japan. Before the start of the Japanese High School Baseball Championship on following year of 1915, the 1936 establishment of the Japanese Baseball League and subsequent growth (after 1950) of Nippon Professional Baseball, the Big6 League was widely considered the highest level of baseball in Japan.

All games are played at Meiji Jingu Stadium in Kasumigaoka, Shinjuku in downtown Tokyo. Games are known to be rowdy and celebratory, with cheerleading squads (応援団, Ōendan) and bands working themselves and the crowd into a frenzy.

It is also the origin of the Tokyo 6 Universities (東京六大学, Tōkyō roku daigaku) nickname that is given to the same six universities.

== History ==
The league has its origins in the Waseda, Keio, and Meiji University League, a three-school conference that began play in 1914 (albeit irregularly). Waseda and Keio had held their first match in 1903. Hosei University joined the league as a guest in 1916 and officially in 1917; the "Four Universities League" expanded to admit Rikkyo in 1921 (becoming the "Five Universities League") and Tokyo in 1925. That year, the suspended Waseda-Keio series was revived for the first time in 19 years, leading to the foundation of the Six Universities League.

In 1926, with the cooperation of the federation, the Meiji Jingu Stadium was completed, and was later expanded to a capacity of 55,000 people in 1931. The Regents Cup was awarded for the fall league match. The league was suspended in 1943 due to World War II, but immediately after the end of the war, on October 28, 1945, a six-college alumni game was held, culminating in a game between Waseda and Keio University at Meiji Jingu on November 18.

Since the end of the US occupation of Japan in 1952, there have been no interruptions in conference play.

On April 1, 2013, the league registered as a general incorporated foundation, the Tokyo Six Universities Baseball Federation.

According to the league's website, 119 players and executives associated with Tokyo Big6 have been inducted into the Japanese Baseball Hall of Fame.

== Schedule and rules ==
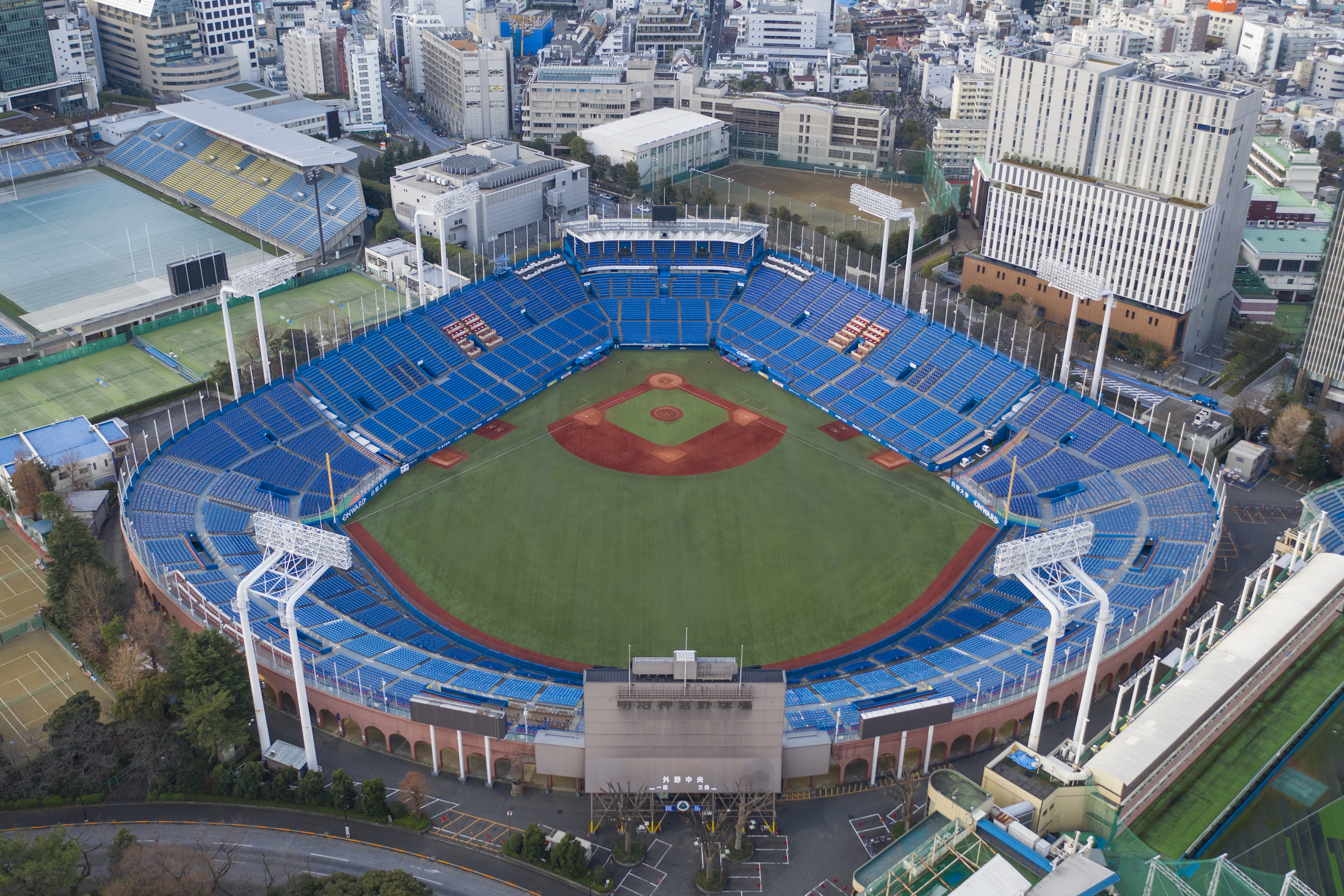
Meiji Jingu Stadium

The six teams play short, eight-weekend seasons in the spring and autumn of each year. Each team plays a short series against each of the five other teams in the league. The series format is similar to a three-game playoff, where the first to two wins is given a series victory. Home field is alternated, and all games are played at Meiji Jingu Stadium. Should a team sweep the first two games, the third game is not played.

The champion of the league is determined by the team with the most series victories. The champion team is given the Emperor's Cup. This is unique in Japan in that the other Emperor's cups are given to national champions in other sports such as Emperor's Cup of Football. The spring champion is allowed to participate in the All Japan University Baseball Championship Series while the fall champion is allowed to compete in the Meiji Jingu Baseball Tournament.

The league uses rules that are similar to that of Nippon Professional Baseball's Central League (and, until recently, the MLB National League): the designated hitter rule is not used, and the pitcher is required to bat. Also, unlike American college baseball, non-wood bats are banned.

== Members ==
Institution	Location	Baseball team founded	Joined	All-time record	Titles	Last title	Type	Colors
Hosei University	Chiyoda, Tokyo	1915	1917	1234–912–132	46	Spring; 2020	Private	
Keio University	Minato, Tokyo	1892	1914	1271–884–105	40	Autumn; 2023	Private	
Meiji University	Fuchū, Tokyo	1910	1914	1302–867–117	43	Spring; 2023	Private	
Rikkyo University	Toshima, Tokyo	1909	1921	972–1180–108	13	Spring; 2017	Private	
University of Tokyo	Bunkyo, Tokyo	1917	1925	257–1728–63	—	—	Public	
Waseda University	Shinjuku, Tokyo	1901	1914	1339–804–97	49	Spring; 2025	Private	

Current as of spring 2025

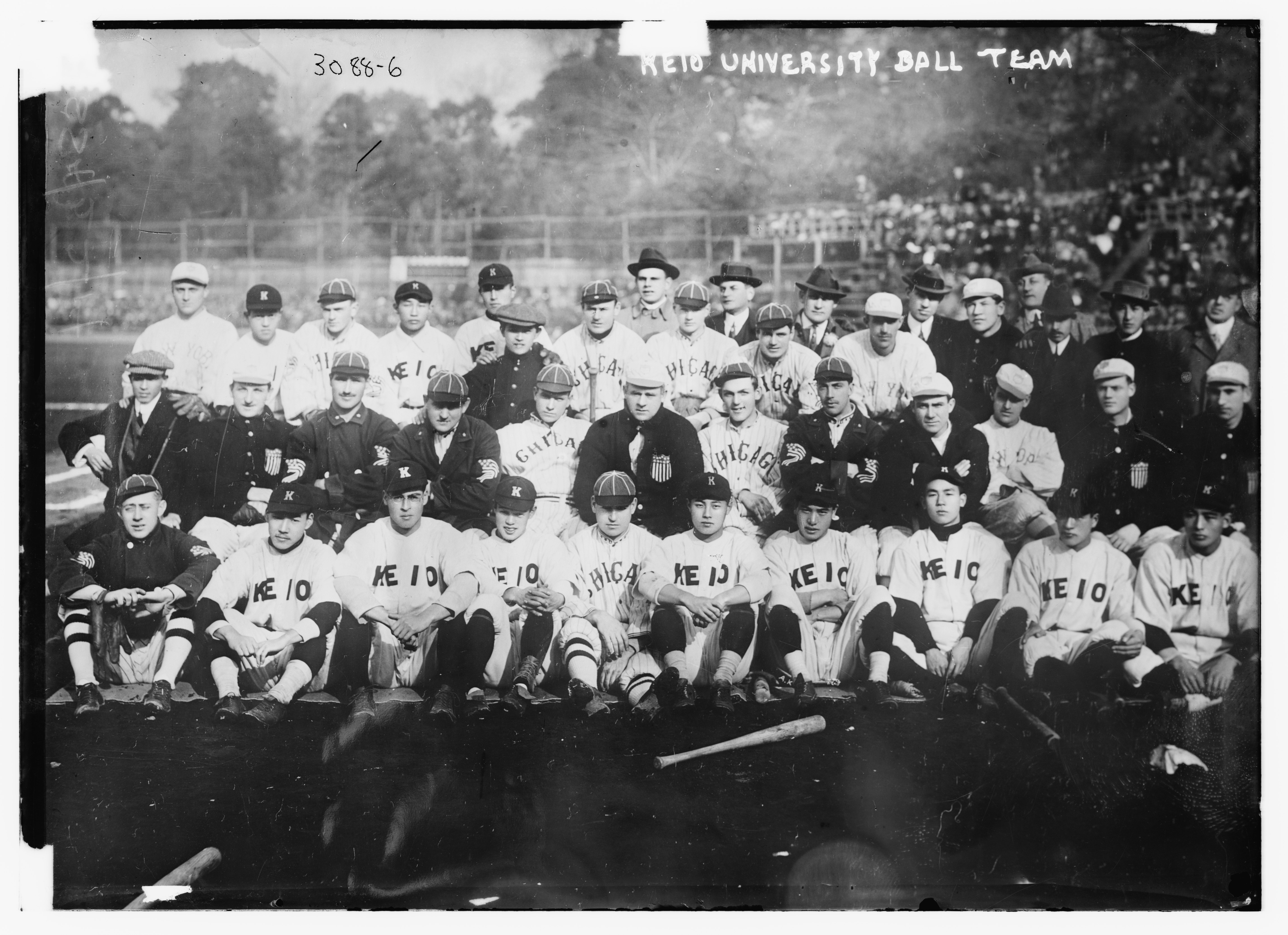
Keio University (1914)

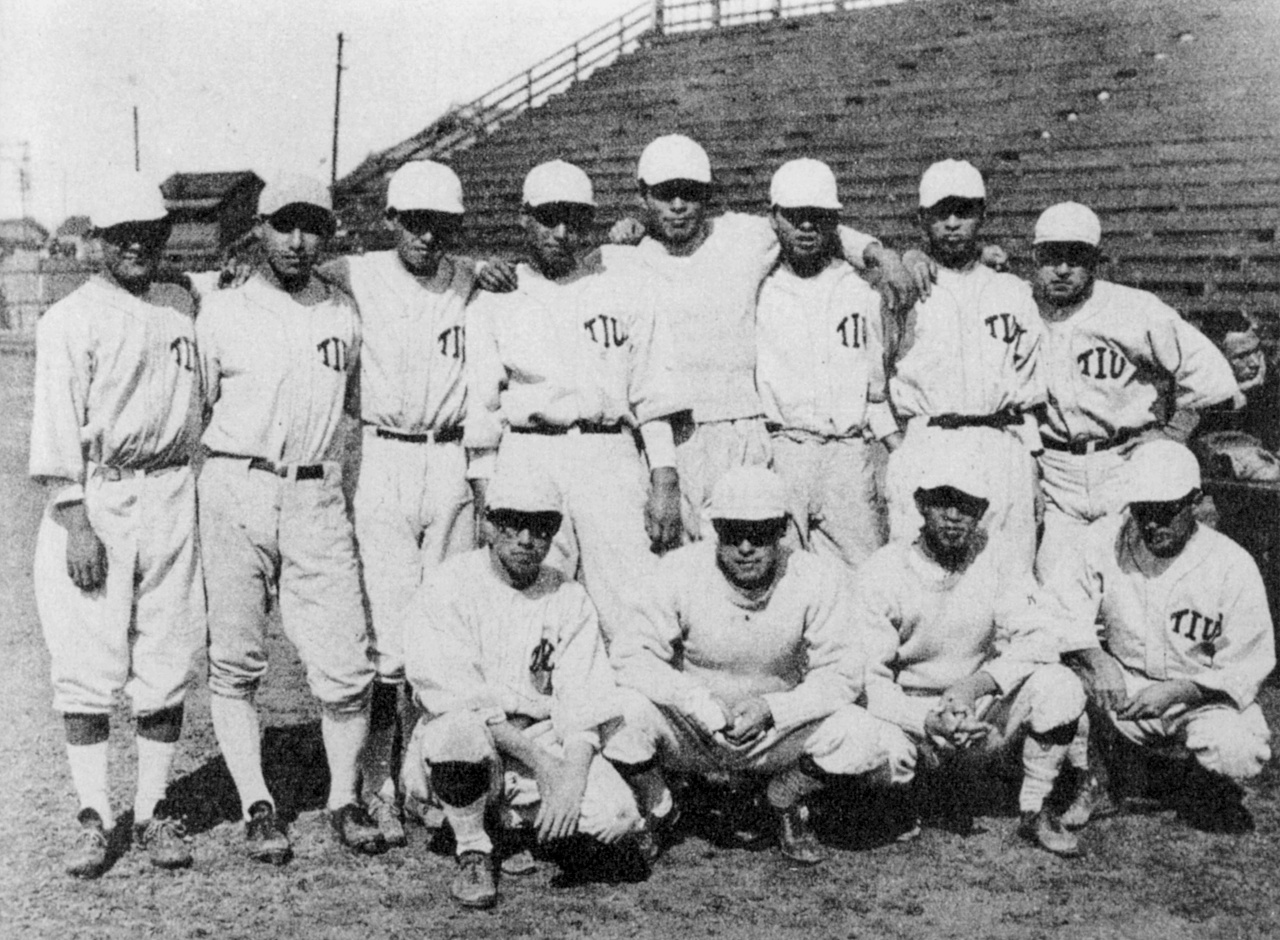
University of Tokyo (1925)

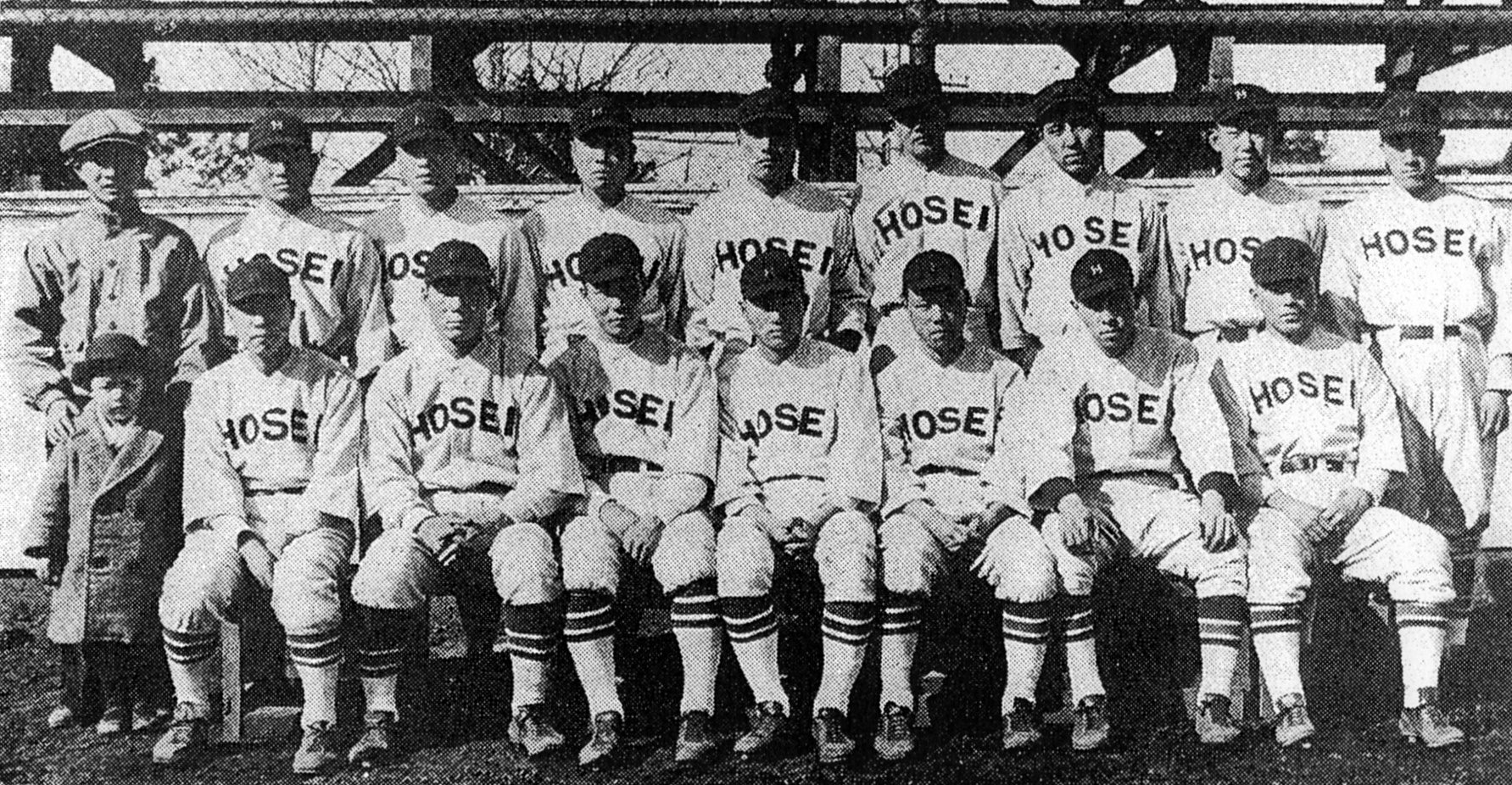
Hosei University (1930)

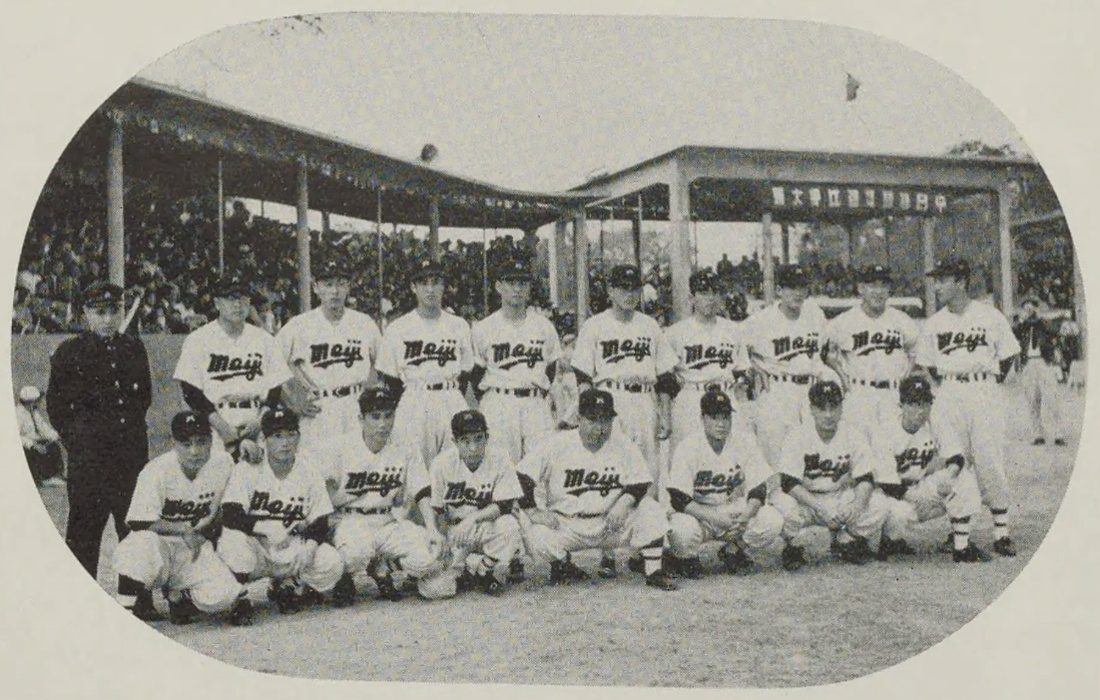
Meiji University (1956)

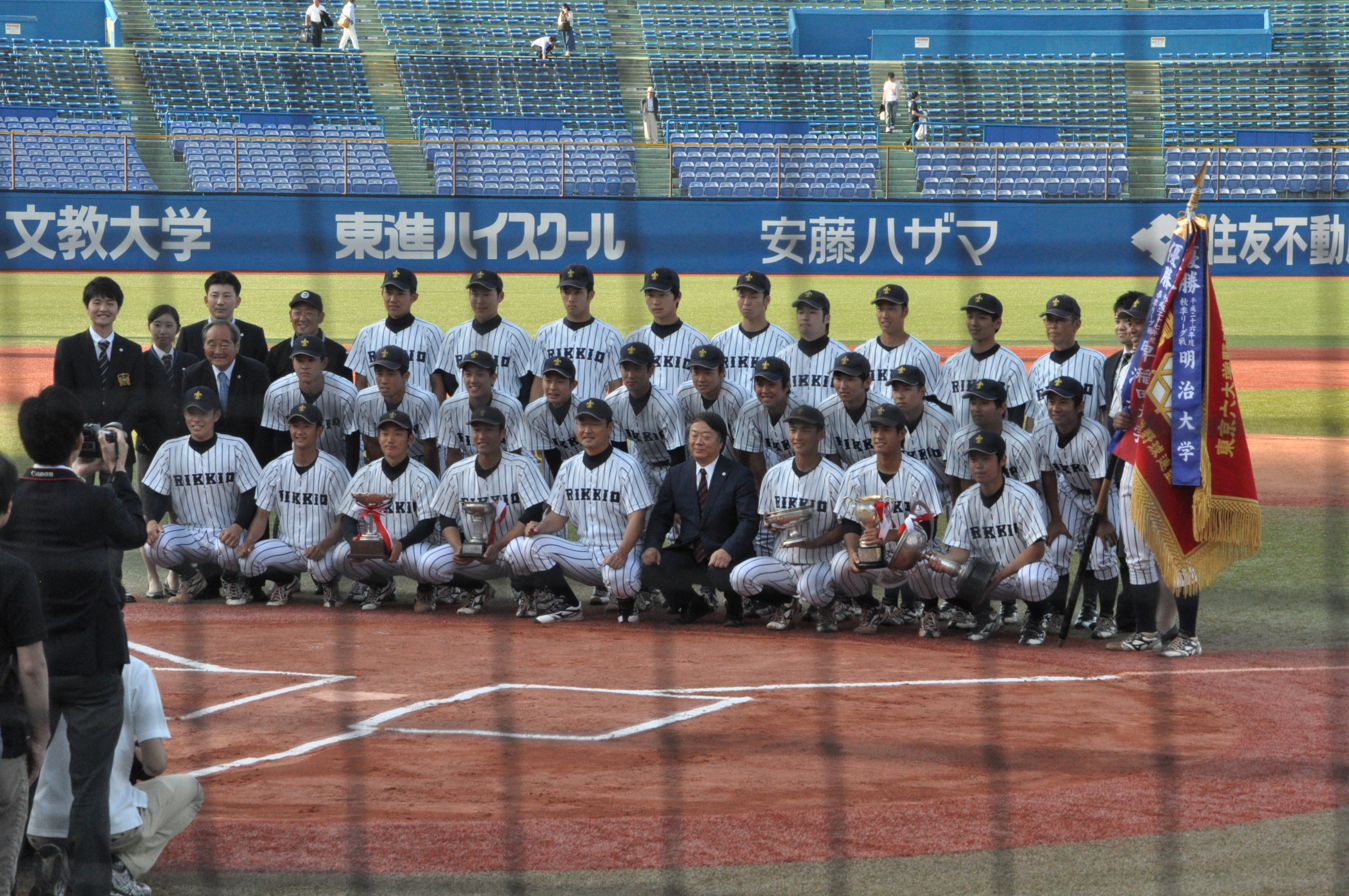
Rikkyo University (2017)

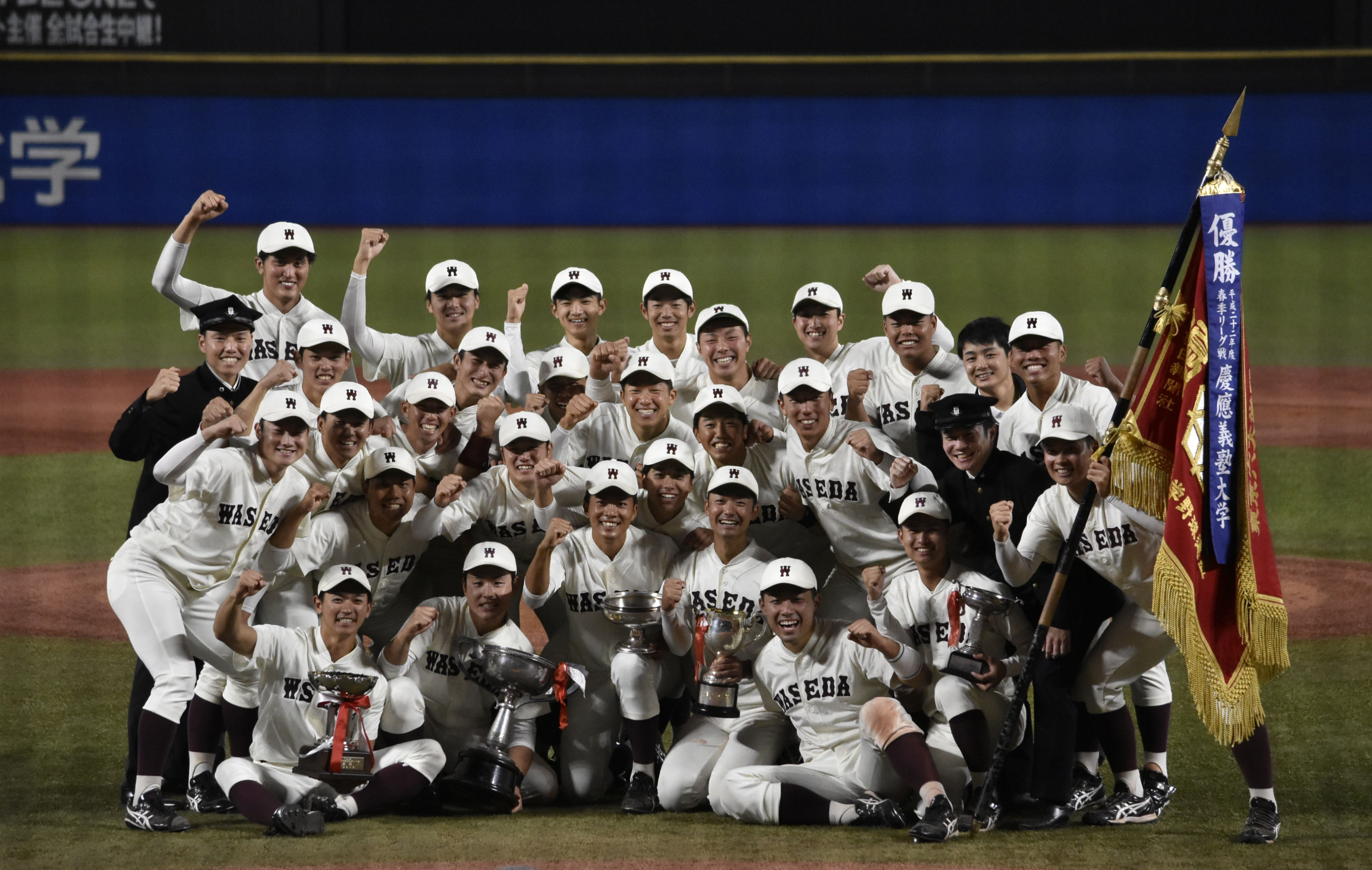
Waseda University (2020)

== Champions ==
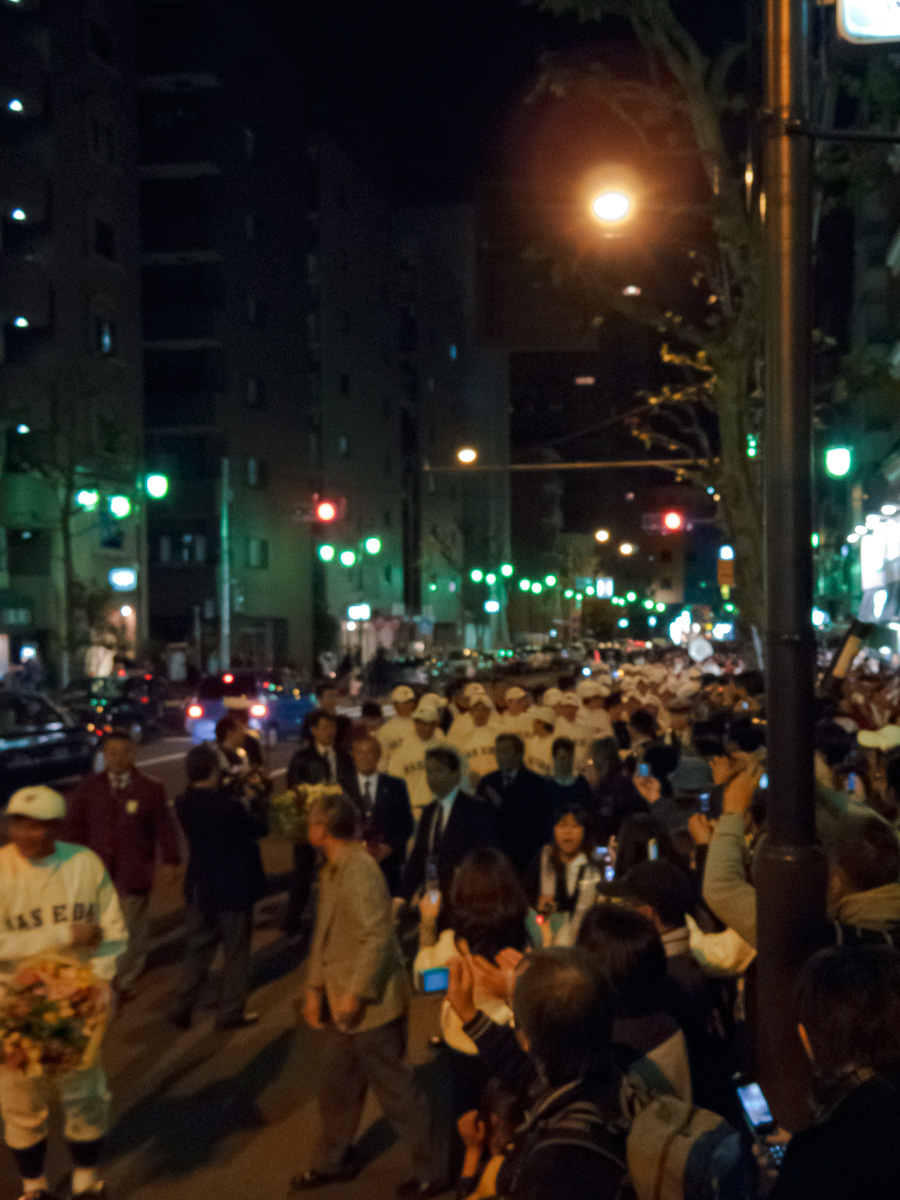
Waseda University victory parade after their 2010 Big6 League victory

Waseda University has the most league championships with 49. Hosei University has 46 titles, Meiji University has won 43 times and Keio University has captured 40 league titles. Rikkyo trails with 13, while the University of Tokyo has yet to win a championship.

University	Number of championships
Waseda	49
Hosei	46
Meiji	43
Keio	40
Rikkyo	13
Tokyo	0

Current as of spring 2025

== Rivalry ==
=== Waseda vs. Keio: Sōkeisen ===
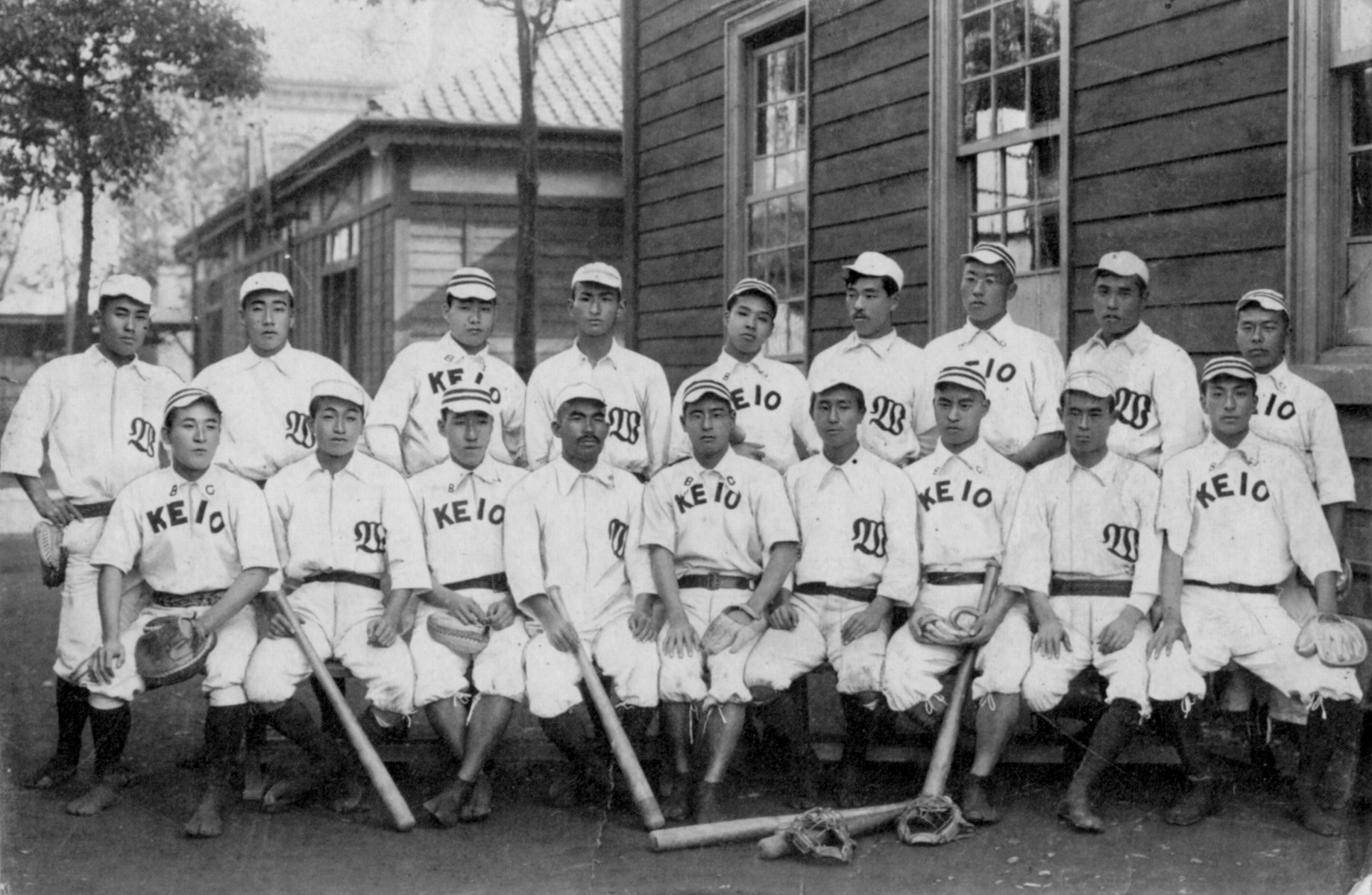
The first players of Sōkeisen (November 21, 1903)

The series between Waseda and Keio, Sōkeisen (早慶戦), attracts the most attention and is greatly enjoyed by the students, not least because it causes classes at both universities to be canceled. The game is still broadcast on NHK and it is the only series played during the last week of the season.

The Sōkeisen actually predates the establishment of the Tokyo Big6 League by over 20 years, beginning in 1903. The games often caused much tension between the two student bodies, often spilling out of the stadium and leading to the cancellation of games.

The addition of Meiji (1914), Hosei (1917) and Rikkyo (1921) would do little to remedy the rivalry. This state would continue until the addition of Tokyo Imperial University and the official establishment of the Tokyo Big6 Baseball League.

The name is a combination of the two university's names first kanji characters and the character for battle or match, sen (戦). Sō, is the alternate reading of Wa (早) in Waseda (早稲田) (also from the short name, Sōdai (早大)), while Kei (慶) is the first character of Keio (慶応).

== Notable alumni ==
=== Hosei alumni ===
- Tadashi Wakabayashi (Hanshin Tigers → Mainichi Orions)
- Koichi Tabuchi (Hanshin Tigers → Seibu Lions)
- Koji Yamamoto (Hiroshima Toyo Carp)
- Suguru Egawa (Yomiuri Giants)
- Takehiko Kobayakawa (Hiroshima Toyo Carp → Yakult Swallows)
- Atsunori Inaba (Yakult Swallows → Hokkaido Nippon Ham Fighters)

=== Keio alumni ===
- Kaoru Betto (Hanshin Tigers / Ōsaka Tigers → Mainichi Orions)
- Motoshi Fujita (Yomiuri Giants)
- Yoshinobu Takahashi (Yomiuri Giants)

=== Meiji alumni ===
- Senichi Hoshino (Chunichi Dragons)
- Katsunori Nomura (Yakult Swallows → Hanshin Tigers → Yomiuri Giants → Tohoku Rakuten Golden Eagles)
- Kenshin Kawakami (Chunichi Dragons → Atlanta Braves)

=== Rikkyo alumni ===
- Shigeo Nagashima (Yomiuri Giants)
- Tadashi Sugiura (Nankai Hawks)
- Kazushige Nagashima (Yakult Swallows → Yomiuri Giants)
- Takeo Kawamura (Yokohama BayStars)
- Kazuhito Tadano (Cleveland Indians → Oakland Athletics)

=== Tokyo alumni ===
- Masatoshi Akihara (film director)
- Takeshi Shina (a member of the House of Representatives (Japan))
- Hirohisa Fujii (former Minister of Finance (Japan), a member of the House of Representatives (Japan))
- Kaoru Yosano (former Minister of Finance (Japan), a member of the House of Representatives (Japan))

=== Waseda alumni ===
- Haruyasu Nakajima (Yomiuri Giants)
- Tatsuro Hirooka (Yomiuri Giants)
- Akinobu Okada (Hanshin Tigers → Orix BlueWave / Orix Buffaloes)
- Hiroo Ishii (Kintetsu Buffaloes → Yomiuri Giants)
- Satoru Komiyama (Lotte Orions / Chiba Lotte Marines → Yokohama BayStars → New York Mets)
- Tsuyoshi Wada (Fukuoka Daiei Hawks / Fukuoka SoftBank Hawks → Norfolk Tides → Chicago Cubs)
- Norichika Aoki (Tokyo Yakult Swallows → Milwaukee Brewers → Kansas City Royals)
- Shugo Fujii (Tokyo Yakult Swallows)
- Shinichi Takeuchi (Tokyo Yakult Swallows)
- Hiroyasu Tanaka (Tokyo Yakult Swallows)
- Takashi Toritani (Hanshin Tigers)
- Daisuke Ochi (Yomiuri Giants)
- Yuki Saito (Hokkaido Nippon Ham Fighters)

== See also ==
- College baseball in Japan
- Tohto University Baseball League
- Kansai Big Six Baseball League
