= Takashi Toritani =

Japanese baseball player (born 1981)

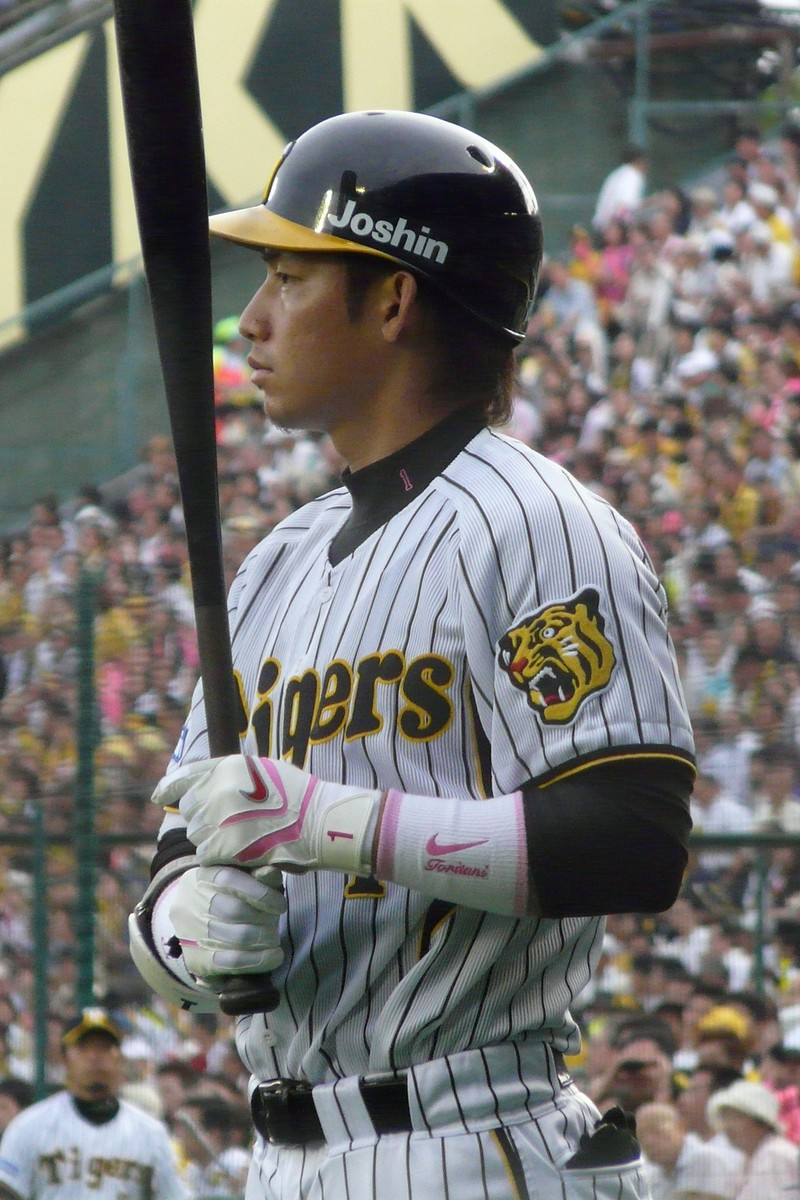
- Toritani with the Hanshin Tigers
- Shortstop
- Born: June 26, 1981 (age 45); Higashimurayama, Tokyo, Japan
- Batted: Left Threw: Right

NPB debut
- April 2, 2004, for the Hanshin Tigers

Last NPB appearance
- June 6, 2021, for the Chiba Lotte Marines

NPB statistics
- Batting average: .278
- Hits: 2,099
- Home runs: 138
- Runs batted in: 830
- Stolen bases: 131
- Stats at Baseball Reference

Teams
- As player: Hanshin Tigers (2004–2019); Chiba Lotte Marines (2020–2021); As coach: Panasonic

Career highlights and awards
- 6× Best Nine Award winner (2008, 2010–2011, 2013–2015); 7× NPB All-Star (2005–2006, 2012–2015, 2017); 5× Golden Glove Award winner (2010, 2013–2015, 2017)

Takashi Toritani (鳥谷 敬, Toritani Takashi; born June 26, 1981) is a Japanese former professional baseball shortstop, commentator, critic, and coach.

Toritani was one of the most highly coveted position players in years as a senior for Waseda University in 2003. He holds the current NPB record for most consecutive games played without missing an inning as a shortstop, and appeared in every Tigers game for over 13 years from 2005 to May 27, 2018 (1,939 regular season games).

== Early life ==
Toritani was born in Higashimurayama, Tokyo, the eldest of three brothers. He played for the Higashimurayama Junior Mets, Ozakudai Little League Club in his elementary school days in Higashimurayama and Hamura, and Mizuho Senior in his junior high school days in Hamura.

He played both shortstop and pitcher at Seibō Gakuen Senior High School in Saitama. He played in the 81st National High School Baseball Championship in 1999, coming on in relief in Seibō Gakuen's first game against Hita-Rinkō High School (the Ōita champions) and clocking 143 km/h (89 mph), but his team lost 5–3.

== College career ==
Toritani went on to enroll at Waseda University as a human sciences major. There, he was surrounded by an impressive collection of talent: his year included then-right fielder Norichika Aoki (Tokyo Yakult Swallows), third baseman Toshimitsu Higa (Hiroshima Carp) and center fielder Shintaro Yoshida (Orix Buffaloes), all three of whom would later go on to the pros. Left-hander Tsuyoshi Wada (Fukuoka SoftBank Hawks) was in the year above him, and second baseman Hiroyasu Tanaka (BayStars) and first baseman Shinichi Takeuchi (Swallows) would join the team one and two years later, respectively.

In the spring of 2001, then-sophomore Toritani led the Tokyo Big6 Baseball League in all three Triple Crown categories (batting average, home runs, runs batted in), tying current Saitama Seibu Lions third baseman Taketoshi Gotoh as the fastest player (by academic year) to win Triple Crown honors in the history of the league. Toritani drew 19 combined walks and hit-batters in the spring 2003 season as a senior, a Tokyo Big6 record (later broken by then-Rikkyo University outfielder Yuichi Tabata in 2004). He won his second batting title that fall.

He won five Tokyo Big6 Best Nine awards during his eight seasons (spring and fall) at Waseda, playing in 96 games and hitting .333 with 11 home runs and 71 RBI for his college career and leading Waseda to a record four consecutive league titles along with the likes of Aoki, Higa and Yoshida. He was one of the most highly touted position players in recent years in the months preceding the 2003 NPB draft and was said to be a complete five-tool player. The Hanshin Tigers signed him as a pre-draft pick in early November. He was assigned the jersey number 1.

== Professional career ==
=== Hanshin Tigers ===
In 2004, amid much hype from both fans and members of the media, Toritani was named the Tigers' starting shortstop and No. 7 hitter in the Tigers' season opener as a rookie despite the presence of 26-year-old Atsushi Fujimoto, who had hit .301 at the same position the year before. He got the first base hit of his career off left-hander Yukinaga Maeda in the eighth inning of the opener against the Yomiuri Giants on April 2. However, struggling to make contact with the ball on a consistent basis, Toritani was replaced by Fujimoto in the sixth game of the season and saw most of his playing time at third base until Fujimoto left the team to play for Japan in the 2004 Athens Olympics, hitting his first career home run off then-Yokohama BayStars right-hander Kazumasa Azuma on May 27 and recording his first career stolen base against the BayStars on July 19. As luck would have it, Fujimoto struggled with his hitting upon rejoining the Tigers after the Olympic Games, and Toritani got most of the starts at shortstop for the remainder of the season. He hit just .251 with three home runs and 17 RBI in 235 at-bats, slugging a mere .345 in a disappointing rookie campaign.

In 2005, Fujimoto was permanently moved to second base, and he and Toritani manned the Tigers' middle infield to begin the season. Toritani became the team's No. 2 hitter after Fujimoto and Kentaro Sekimoto, who had platooned in the 2-hole, struggled with their hitting. He played in all 146 games, hitting .278 with nine home runs and 52 RBI and even hitting two walk-off home runs in contributing to the Tigers' league championship.

It was reported that he had married his high school sweetheart, who had been a year older than he was and the baseball team's team manager, on December 20 during the off-season.

Toritani continued to make strides offensively, hitting .289 with 15 home runs and 58 RBI for the season in 2006. During one stretch from June 1 to 3, he hit a two-run home run to give his team the lead in the first game against the Tohoku Rakuten Golden Eagles, a solo home run and an RBI double against Fukuoka SoftBank Hawks ace Kazumi Saito in the second, and a walk-off hit against Hawks right-hander Yoshiaki Fujioka in the third. He struggled on the defensive end, however, leading all of Japanese professional baseball with 21 errors.

His wife gave birth to their first child (a boy) in September.

Toritani replaced center fielder Norihiro Akahoshi as the team's leadoff hitter in 2007, but struggled with this new role, hitting .273 with 10 home runs and seeing declines in almost every offensive category. Despite this, he established a new NPB record for consecutive games played without missing an inning with 340 on July 24 in a game against the Chunichi Dragons. He extended this record to 398, but was taken out of the game early on September 29 to heal an injury he had suffered when hit by a pitch several days earlier. Toritani also made headlines when a Japanese tabloid reported that he had invited three women over to his hotel room while the team was staying in Tokyo during one away game stretch in September. The Tigers organization issued him a warning for his actions.

In 2008, Toritani became the Tigers' No. 6 hitter, hitting over .300 for most of the year and even seeing time at the 3- and 5-hole (along with Sekimoto) while slugger Takahiro Arai was recovering from an injury. He returned to the No. 6 spot after Makoto Imaoka was promoted to the ichigun (Japanese equivalent of "major league") level. Toritani was one of only three players in either of the Japanese leagues (along with teammate and left fielder Tomoaki Kanemoto and Hokkaido Nippon-Ham Fighters second baseman Kensuke Tanaka) to play all 144 games without missing an inning. He finished the year with a .281 batting average, 13 home runs and a career-high 80 RBI, winning his first Best Nine Award. His wife gave birth to their second child on September 13.

For 2009, Toritani was named the Tigers' No. 3 hitter by newly appointed manager Akinobu Mayumi, hitting .333 with three home runs and 14 RBI and scoring a league-leading 20 runs in front of cleanup hitter Kanemoto (who himself hit .379 with eight homers and 30 RBI) in the month of April.

In 2014, Toritani informed Tigers' management of his wish to exercise his free agent right to transfer to Major League Baseball(MLB), but eventually re-signed with the Tigers.

On December 2, 2019, he became free agent.

=== Chiba Lotte Marines ===
On March 10, 2020, Toritani signed with the Chiba Lotte Marines of the NPB. He was assigned the jersey number 00.

On October 31, 2021, he announced his retirement from active duty for the season only.

== Playing style ==
=== Hitting ===
Toritani was a left-handed spray hitter listed at 5 ft 11 in and 170 lb. He stands upright in the batter's box, employing an exaggerated open stance with his hands held shoulder-high away from his body. Toritani has gap power and can hit fairly evenly to all fields; though the majority of his extra-base hits were to the opposite field earlier in his career, he has gradually shown an ability to pull the ball for extra bases as well. He was a fast base runner (his six triples in 2008 were the third-most in the league) and rarely makes mistakes on the basepaths, but was generally passive and does not look to steal unless given the sign to do so.

=== Fielding ===
Toritani has good range on the defensive end (he set a single-season Central League record for assists as a shortstop with 490 in 2006) and one of the strongest throwing arms of any NPB player at his position, routinely making plays from deep in the 5.5 hole (the area between third and short). However, he was somewhat error-prone, particularly on the throwing end of plays. His 15 errors in the 2008 season tied for most among Central League shortstops (Yomiuri Giants shortstop Hayato Sakamoto also committed 15).

== Career statistics ==
Nippon Professional Baseball
Year	Age	Team	G	AB	R	H	2B	3B	HR	TB	RBI	SB	AVG	OBP	SLG	OPS
2004	22	Hanshin	101	235	28	59	13	0	3	81	17	2	.251	.320	.345	.665
2005	23	Hanshin	**146**	572	82	159	27	1	9	215	52	5	.278	.343	.376	.719
2006	24	Hanshin	**146**	543	65	157	28	2	15	234	58	5	.289	.362	.431	.793
2007	25	Hanshin	**144**	565	67	154	19	4	10	211	43	7	.273	.350	.373	.724
2008	26	Hanshin	**144**	523	66	147	17	6	13	215	80	4	.281	.365	.411	.776
2009	27	Hanshin	**144**	538	84	155	31	2	20	250	75	7	.288	.368	.465	.819
2010	28	Hanshin	**144**	575	98	173	31	6	19	273	104	13	.301	.373	.475	.848
2011	29	Hanshin	**144**	500	71	150	28	**7**	5	207	51	16	.300	**.395**	.414	.809
2012	30	Hanshin	**144**	515	62	135	22	6	8	193	59	15	.262	.373	.375	.748
2013	31	Hanshin	**144**	532	74	150	30	4	10	218	65	15	.282	.402	.410	.812
2014	32	Hanshin	**144**	550	96	172	28	2	8	228	73	10	.313	.406	.415	.820
2015	33	Hanshin	**143**	551	69	155	21	4	6	202	42	9	.281	.380	.367	.747
2016	34	Hanshin	**143**	449	49	106	16	1	7	145	36	13	.236	.344	.323	.667
2017	35	Hanshin	**143**	488	57	143	23	3	4	184	41	8	.293	.390	.377	.767
2018	36	Hanshin	121	220	15	51	11	0	1	65	22	1	.232	.333	.295	.629
2019	37	Hanshin	74	92	9	19	3	1	0	24	4	1	.207	.298	.261	.559
2020	38	Lotte	42	36	5	5	2	0	0	7	6	0	.139	.205	.194	.400
2021	39	Lotte	32	53	7	9	3	0	0	12	2	0	.170	.279	.226	.505
**Career**			**2243**	**8747**	**1004**	**2099**	**353**	**49**	**138**	**2964**	**830**	**131**	**.278**	**.368**	**.393**	**.762**

Bold indicates league leader; statistics current as of 2019

== See also ==
- List of Nippon Professional Baseball career hits leaders
