= Kazumasa =

- Gender: Male

Origin
- Origin: Japanese
- Meaning: Different meanings depending on the kanji used

Kazumasa (written: 数正, 和正, 和昌, 和政, 一眞, 一正, 一将, 一存, 一政 or 員昌) is a masculine Japanese given name. Notable people with the name include:

- Kazumasa Azuma (東 和政; born 1982), Japanese baseball player
- Kazumasa Hashimoto (橋本 和昌; born 1974), Japanese musician
- Kazumasa Hirai (author) (平井 和正; born 1938), Japanese writer
- Kazumasa Hirai (weightlifter) (平井 一正; born 1949), Japanese weightlifter
- Ikoma Kazumasa (生駒 一正; 1555–1610), Japanese samurai
- Ishikawa Kazumasa (石川 数正; 1534–1609), Japanese samurai
- Isono Kazumasa (磯野 員昌; 1534–1583), Japanese samurai
- Kazumasa Kawano (河野 和正; born 1970), Japanese footballer
- Kazumasa Kikuchi (菊地 和正; born 1982), Japanese baseball player
- Kazumasa Nagai (永井一正; 1929–2026), Japanese printmaker and graphic designer
- Kazumasa Oda (小田 和正; born 1947), Japanese singer-songwriter and composer
- Ogawa Kazumasa (小川 一眞; 1860–1929), Japanese photographer
- Kazumasa Sakai (坂井 一将; born 1990), Japanese badminton player
- Kazumasa Sasaki (佐々木 一正; born 1989), Japanese ice hockey player
- Seki Kazumasa (関 一政; 1564–1625), Japanese daimyō
- Kazumasa Shimizu (清水 和昌; born 1976), Japanese footballer
- Sogō Kazumasa (十河 一存; 1532–1561), Japanese samurai
- Kazumasa Takagi (高木 和正; born 1984), Japanese footballer
- Kazumasa Tsujimoto (辻本 和正; born 1975), Japanese boxer
- Kazumasa Uesato (上里 一将; born 1986), Japanese footballer
- Kazumasa Yoshida (吉田 一将; born 1989), Japanese baseball player
