= Shoda =

Shoda (written: 翔田, 正田, 庄田 or 荘田) is a Japanese surname. Notable people with the surname include:

- Ayako Shōda (正田 絢子, born 1981), Japanese sport wrestler
- Itsuki Shoda (正田 樹, born 1981), Japanese baseball pitcher
- Kazue Shōda (勝田 主計, 1869–1948), Japanese statesman
- Kenjiro Shoda (正田 建次郎, 1902–1977), Japanese mathematician
- Michelle Shoda (born 1960), American beauty contestant
- Shinoe Shōda (正田 篠枝, 1910–1965), Japanese poet
- Takahiro Shoda (庄田 隆弘, born 1979), Japanese baseball player
