= Taichi Okazaki =

Japanese baseball player

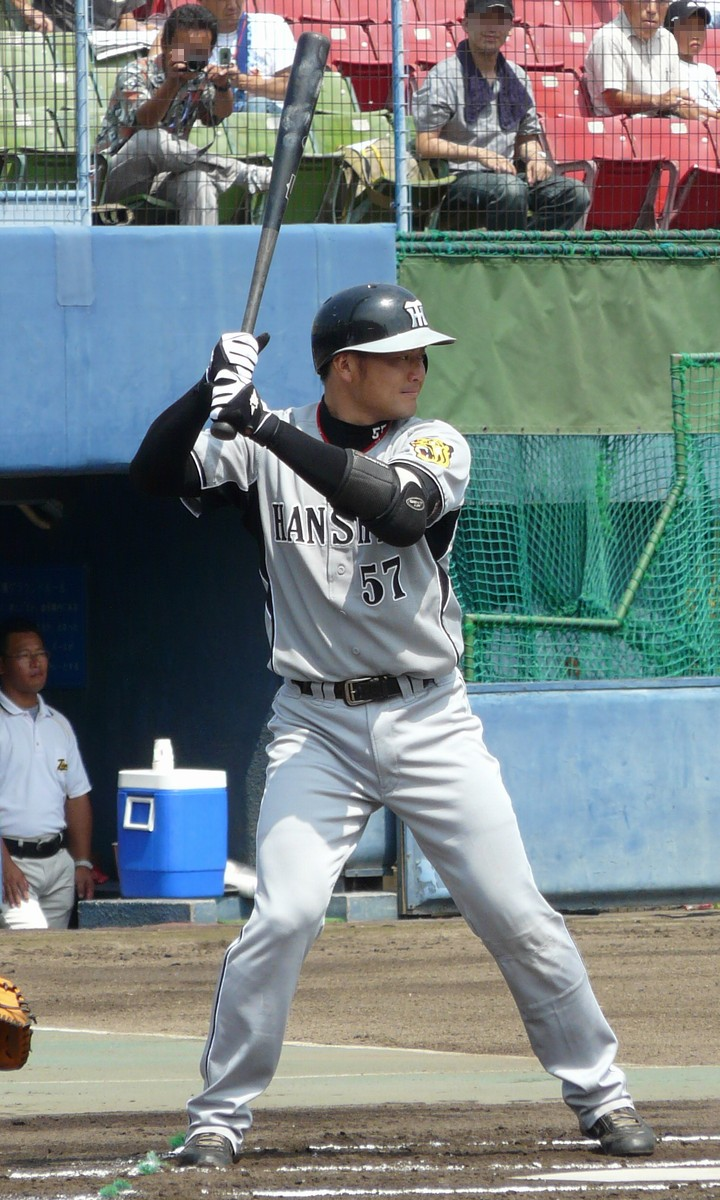
- Okazaki with the Hanshin Tigers
- Catcher
- Born: June 20, 1983 (age 43); Gojō, Nara, Japan
- Bats: Right Throws: Right

NPB debut
- April 4, 2009, for the Hanshin Tigers

NPB statistics (through 2020 season)
- Batting average: .185
- Home runs: 2
- RBI: 11
- Stats at Baseball Reference

Teams
- Hanshin Tigers (2005–2020)

Taichi Okazaki (岡崎太一, Okazaki Taichi; born June 20, 1983 in Gojō, Nara) is a Japanese former professional baseball catcher. He has played in his entire career with the Nippon Professional Baseball (NPB) for the Hanshin Tigers.

== Career ==
Okazaki selected Hanshin Tigers in the 2004 NPB draft.

On April 4, 2009, Okazaki made his NPB debut.

After the 2020 season, Okazaki announced his retirement.
