= Masahiro Tanaka (baseball, born 1954) =

Japanese baseball player

- First baseman / Outfielder
- Born: September 28, 1954 (age 71); Gojō, Nara Prefecture, Japan
- Bats: Right Throws: Right

NPB debut
- September 8, 1982, for the Hanshin Tigers

Career statistics
- Batting average: .238
- Hits: 49
- Home runs: 5
- Runs batted in: 24
- At-bats: 206

Teams
- Hanshin Tigers (1979–1986) (NPB)

Masahiro Tanaka (田中 昌宏, Tanaka Masahiro; born September 28, 1954) is a former Japanese baseball first baseman and outfielder.

== Early life ==
Tanaka went to high school at Chiben Gakuen High School in Japan and went to college at Osaka Shogyo University in Japan.
