= Takahiro Shoda =

Japanese baseball player (born 1979)

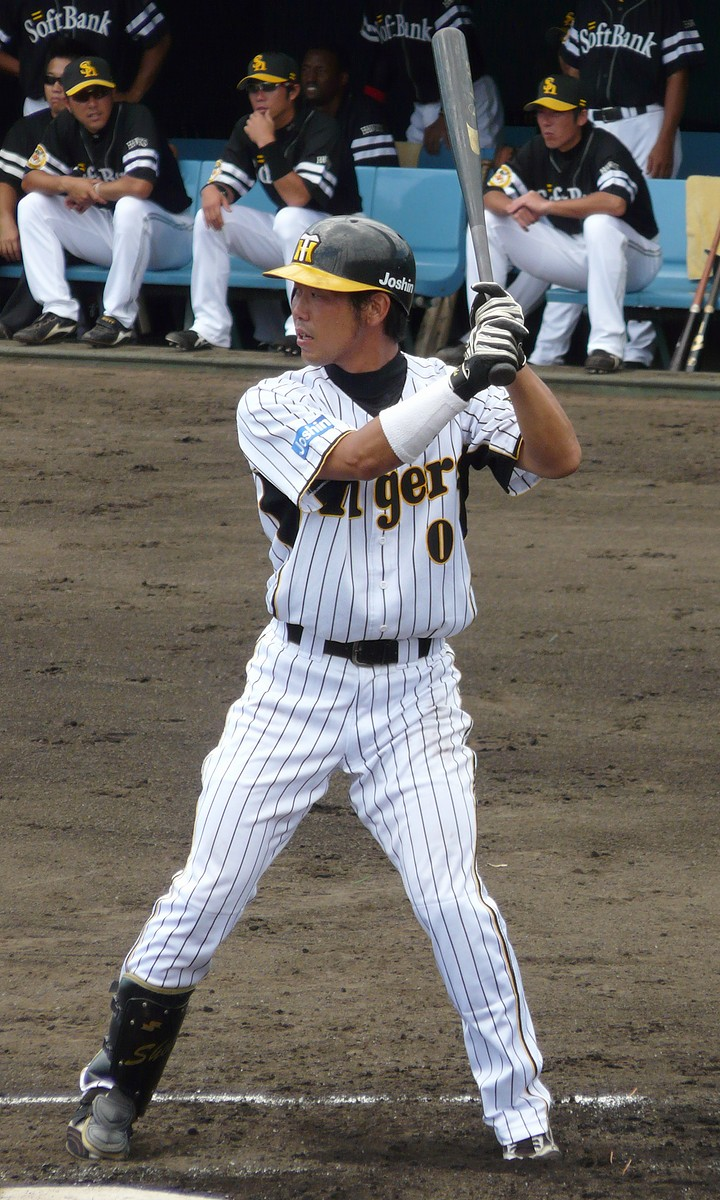
- outfielder
- Born: 1979-11-9
- Bats: left Throws: left

debut
- June 13, 2007, for the Hanshin Tigers

Teams
- Hanshin Tigers (2004–2010)

Takahiro Shoda (庄田 隆弘; born November 9, 1979) is a Japanese professional baseball player from Sakurai, Nara Prefecture, Japan. He was with the Hanshin Tigers from 2004 until 2010.
