= Kazumasa Azuma =

Japanese baseball player

- Pitcher
- Born: June 1, 1982 (age 43); Kōchi, Japan
- Batted: Right Threw: Right

debut
- August 17, 2001, for the Yokohama BayStars

Last appearance
- July 4, 2006, for the Saitama Seibu Lions
- Stats at Baseball Reference

Teams
- Yokohama BayStars (2001–2004); Seibu Lions/Saitama Seibu Lions (2005–2008)

Kazumasa Azuma (東 和政, Azuma Kazumasa; born June 1, 1982) is a retired Japanese Nippon Professional Baseball pitcher with the Saitama Seibu Lions in Japan's Pacific League.

== Career ==
He started playing baseball in the second grade of elementary school and won the national tournament in the third year of junior high school. He received invitations from strong schools in the prefecture, but he refused and went to the local Sukumo High School, and in the summer of his third year, he lost to Meitoku Gijuku in the semifinals of the prefectural tournament. He joined the team after being selected 4th overall by the Yokohama BayStars in the 2000 draft. Although he graduated from high school, he started pitching in the first team from his first year.

In 2002, he pitched in 28 games for the first team. On May 25, 2003, he made his first professional start against the Yomiuri Giants (Yokohama Stadium). He competed in Fresh All-Stars. He was the starting pitcher for the Eastern selection. He is the Eastern League's best pitcher with an ERA of 1.55.

On June 23, 2004, he was traded to the Seibu Lions along with pitcher Masahiro Tasaki in an exchange trade with pitcher Yoshihiro Doi.

On July 4, 2006, he pitched as a reliever in a game against the Fukuoka SoftBank Hawks and got his first win after transferring to the Seibu Lions, even though he only faced one batter.

In 2008, he did not appear in the first team for the second year in a row and was notified that he was out of action. He was announced as a free agent on December 2. He makes a fresh start as a company employee.
