= Shinichi Takeuchi =

Japanese baseball player (born 1983)

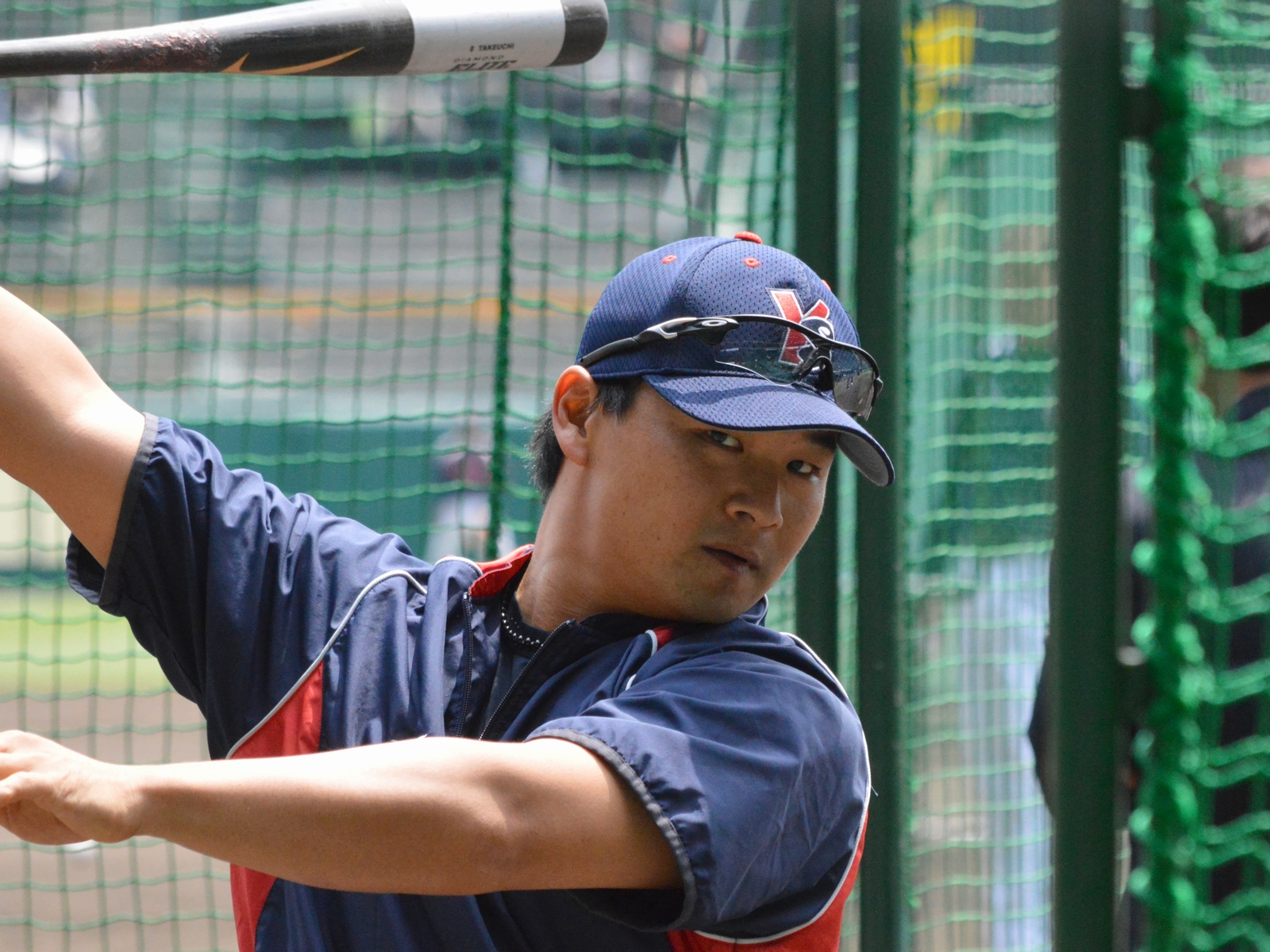
- First baseman / Outfielder
- Born: December 10, 1983 (age 42); Kobe, Hyōgo, Japan
- Bats: Left Throws: Left

debut
- April 1, 2006, for the Tokyo Yakult Swallows
- Stats at Baseball Reference

Teams
- Tokyo Yakult Swallows (2006–2018)

Shinichi Takeuchi (武内 晋一, Takeuchi Shin'ichi; born December 10, 1983 in Kobe, Hyōgo Prefecture, Japan) is a former Nippon Professional Baseball player. He played infield and outfield for the Tokyo Yakult Swallows.
