= Hiroyasu Tanaka =

Japanese baseball player (born 1982)

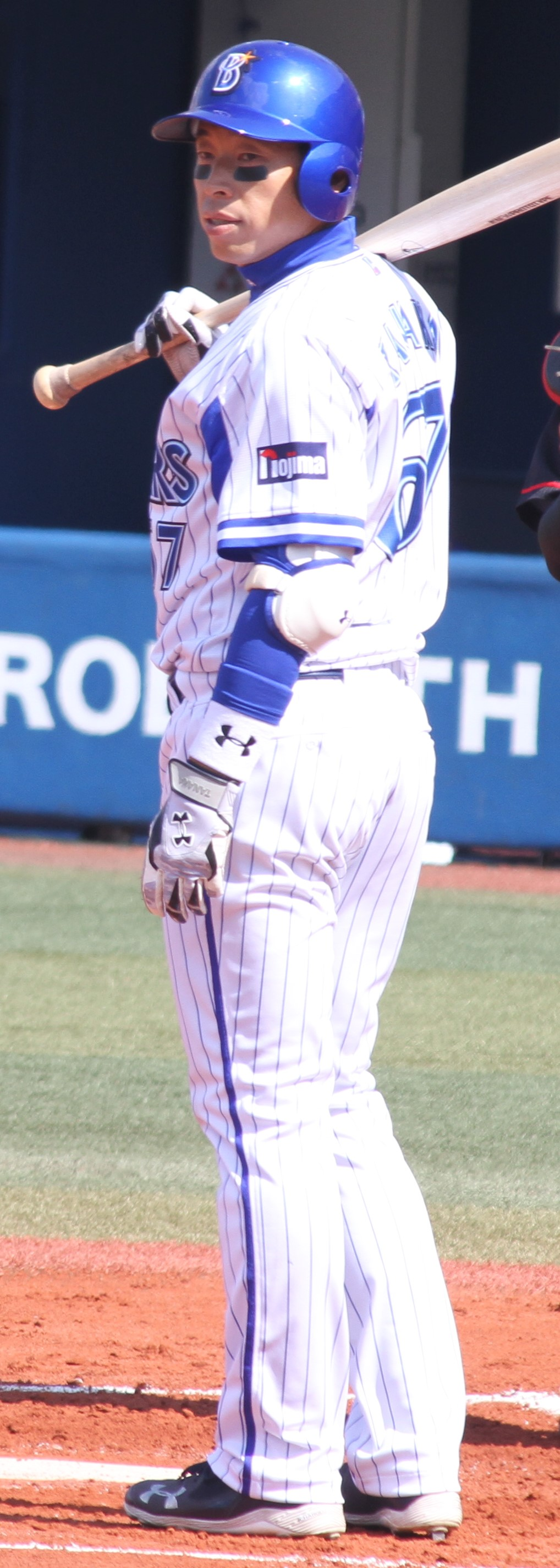
- Tanaka with the Yokohama DeNA BayStars

Yokohama DeNA BayStars – No. 97
- Second baseman / Coach
- Born: May 24, 1982 (age 44); Kizugawa, Kyoto, Japan
- Batted: Right-handed Threw: Right-handed

NPB debut
- April 6, 2005, for the Yakult Swallows

Last NPB appearance
- September 26, 2018, for the Yokohama DeNA BayStars

Career statistics
- Batting average: .266
- Home runs: 31
- Runs batted in: 351
- Stats at Baseball Reference

Teams
- As player: Yakult Swallows/Tokyo Yakult Swallows (2005–2016); Yokohama DeNA BayStars (2017–2018); As coach: Yokohama DeNA BayStars (2020–present)

Career highlights and awards
- 2× Best Nine Award (2007, 2012); 1× Mitsui Golden Glove Award (2012)

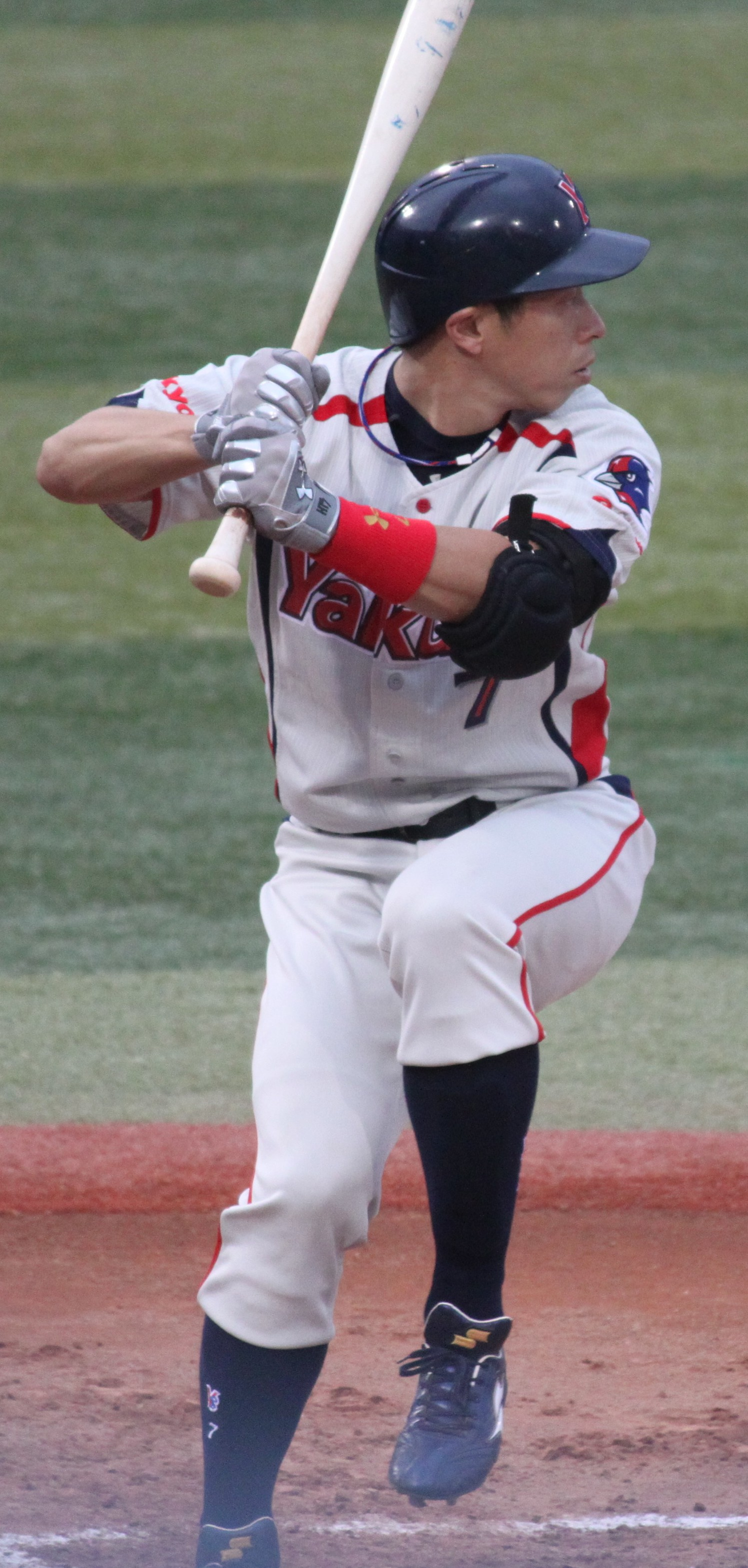
Tanaka with the Tokyo Yakult Swallows

Hiroyasu Tanaka (Japanese:田中 浩康, born May 24, 1982) is a Japanese former professional baseball player. He was the number 1 draft pick for the Yakult Swallows in 2005.
