= 2009 Yomiuri Giants season =

2009 Yomiuri Giants
- Japan Series champions
- Central League champions
- League: Central League
- Ballpark: Tokyo Dome
- Record: 89–46–9 (.649)
- League place: 1st
- Owners: Yomiuri Group
- Manager: Tatsunori Hara

The 2009 Yomiuri Giants season was the 76th season for the Yomiuri Giants franchise.

== Regular season ==
=== Standings ===
2009 Central League regular season standings
| Team | Pld | W | L | T | PCT | GB |
|---|---|---|---|---|---|---|
| Yomiuri Giants | **144** | **89** | **46** | **9** | .649 | — |
| Chunichi Dragons | 144 | 81 | 62 | 1 | .566 | 12 |
| Tokyo Yakult Swallows | 144 | 71 | 72 | 1 | .497 | 22 |
| Hanshin Tigers | 144 | 67 | 73 | 4 | .479 | 24.5 |
| Hiroshima Carp | 144 | 65 | 75 | 4 | .465 | 26.5 |
| Yokohama BayStars | 144 | 51 | 93 | 0 | .354 | 42.5 |

=== Record vs. opponents ===
**Central League**
| Chunichi Dragons | 16–8–0 |
| Hanshin Tigers | 11–11–2 |
| Hiroshima Toyo Carp | 14–7–3 |
| Tokyo Yakult Swallows | 18–5–1 |
| Yokohama BayStars | 18–6–0 |
**Pacific League**
| Chiba Lotte Marines | 1–1–2 |
| Fukuoka SoftBank Hawks | 1–3–0 |
| Hokkaido Nippon-Ham Fighters | 2–2–0 |
| Orix Buffaloes | 2–2–0 |
| Saitama Seibu Lions | 2–1–1 |
| Tohoku Rakuten Golden Eagles | 4–0–0 |
| Interleague total | 12–9–3 |
| **Total** | **89–46–9** |

=== Game log ===
Legend
| | Giants win |
| | Giants loss |
| | Giants tie |
| | Postponement |
| **Bold** | Giants team member |

2009 Game Log
April

| # | Date | Opponent | Score | Win | Loss | Save | Attendance | Record |
|---|---|---|---|---|---|---|---|---|
| 1 | April 3 | Carp | 3–6 | Lewis (1–0) | **Greisinger** (0–1) | Nagakawa (1) | 44,124 | 0–1–0 |
| 2 | April 4 | Carp | 3–5 | Maeda (1–0) | **Nakamura** (0–1) | Nagakawa (2) | 42,650 | 0–2–0 |
| 3 | April 5 | Carp | 1–1 (12) | Game tied after 12 innings | | | 42,275 | 0–2–1 |
| 4 | April 7 | @ BayStars | 1–5 | **Takahashi** (1–0) | Terahara (0–1) | | 20,168 | 1–2–1 |
| 5 | April 8 | @ BayStars | 1–12 | **Fukuda** (1–0) | Kudoh (0–1) | | 16,361 | 2–2–1 |
| 6 | April 9 | @ BayStars | 2–9 | **Greisinger** (1–1) | Walrond (0–1) | | 16,691 | 3–2–1 |
| 7 | April 10 | Tigers | 6–5 | **Ochi** (1–0) | Egusa (1–1) | **Kroon** (1) | 43,356 | 4–2–1 |
| 8 | April 11 | Tigers | 4–1 | **Tono** (1–0) | Nomi (0–2) | **Kroon** (2) | 44,284 | 5–2–1 |
| 9 | April 12 | Tigers | 6–6 (12) | Game tied after 12 innings | | | 44,246 | 5–2–2 |
| — | April 14 | @ Swallows | Game postponed due to rain | | | | | |
| 10 | April 15 | @ Swallows | 2–6 | **Greisinger** (2–1) | Kida (1–1) | | 20,072 | 6–2–2 |
| 11 | April 16 | @ Swallows | 6–2 | Tateyama (1–0) | **Utsumi** (0–1) | | 16,592 | 6–3–2 |
| 12 | April 17 | @ Dragons | 3–5 | **Tono** (2–0) | Yoshimi (2–1) | **Kroon** (3) | 35,669 | 7–3–2 |
| 13 | April 18 | @ Dragons | 2–3 | **Yamaguchi** (1–0) | Chen (1–1) | **Kroon** (4) | 37,883 | 8–3–2 |
| 14 | April 19 | @ Dragons | 5–6 | **Nishimura** (1–0) | Nelson (0–1) | **Kroon** (5) | 37,815 | 9–3–2 |
| 15 | April 21 | Swallows | 4–0 | **Greisinger** (3–1) | Kida (1–2) | | 20,817 | 10–3–2 |
| 16 | April 22 | Swallows | 3–2 | **Yamaguchi** (2–0) | Igarashi (0–1) | **Kroon** (6) | 15,876 | 11–3–2 |
| 17 | April 23 | Swallows | 2–1 | **Ochi** (2–0) | Oshimoto (0–2) | | 20,120 | 12–3–2 |
| 18 | April 24 | Dragons | 2–3 (10) | Kobayashi (1–0) | **Ochi** (2–1) | Iwase (5) | 42,262 | 12–4–2 |
| 19 | April 25 | Dragons | 5–4 | **Toyoda** (1–0) | Iwase (0–1) | | 43,707 | 13–4–2 |
| 20 | April 26 | Dragons | 0–8 | Kawai (1–0) | **Greisinger** (3–2) | | 43,020 | 13–5–2 |
| 21 | April 28 | @ Carp | 5–0 | Otake (1–1) | **Utsumi** (0–2) | | 24,423 | 13–6–2 |
| 22 | April 29 | @ Carp | 2–0 | Saito (2–1) | **Tono** (2–1) | Nagakawa (8) | 31,773 | 13–7–2 |
| 23 | April 30 | @ Carp | 4–7 | **Fukuda** (2–0) | Maeda (2–3) | **Ochi** (1) | 26,322 | 14–7–2 |

May

| # | Date | Opponent | Score | Win | Loss | Save | Attendance | Record |
|---|---|---|---|---|---|---|---|---|
| 24 | May 2 | @ Tigers | 5–6 | **Yamaguchi** (3–0) | Fujikawa (1–1) | **Ochi** (2) | 46,425 | 15–7–2 |
| 25 | May 3 | @ Tigers | 0–4 | **Gonzalez** (1–0) | Cheng (0–1) | | 46,440 | 16–7–2 |
| 26 | May 4 | @ Tigers | 6–0 | Shimoyanagi (2–2) | **Utsumi** (0–3) | | 46,434 | 16–8–2 |
| 27 | May 5 | BayStars | 4–6 | Walrond (2–2) | **Tono** (2–2) | Yamaguchi (1) | 45,835 | 16–9–2 |
| 28 | May 6 | BayStars | 3–2 | **Yamaguchi** (4–0) | Sanada (0–1) | | 43,182 | 17–9–2 |
| 29 | May 7 | BayStars | 7–3 | **Nishimura** (2–0) | Yamaguchi (2–1) | | 40,139 | 18–9–2 |
| 30 | May 8 | Dragons | 10–4 | **Greisinger** (4–2) | Yamai (0–2) | | 42,927 | 19–9–2 |
| 31 | May 9 | Dragons | 3–1 | **Gonzalez** (2–0) | Chen (2–2) | **Ochi** (3) | 42,047 | 20–9–2 |
| 32 | May 10 | Dragons | 8–7 | **Nakamura** (1–1) | Saito (2–1) | **Ochi** (4) | 43,185 | 21–9–2 |
| 33 | May 12 | @ BayStars | 3–5 | **Takahashi** (2–0) | Walrond (2–3) | **Ochi** (5) | 19,691 | 22–9–2 |
| 34 | May 13 | @ BayStars | 9–8 | Yamaguchi (3–1) | **Toyoda** (1–1) | | 20,412 | 22–10–2 |
| 35 | May 14 | @ BayStars | 5–9 | **Greisinger** (5–2) | Fujie (0–1) | | 19,279 | 23–10–2 |
| 36 | May 15 | @ Carp | 2–5 | **Gonzalez** (3–0) | Aoki (0–2) | **Kroon** (7) | 30,164 | 24–10–2 |
| 37 | May 16 | @ Carp | 0–0 (12) | Game tied after 12 innings | | | 29,794 | 24–10–3 |
| 38 | May 17 | @ Carp | 1–2 | **Ochi** (3–1) | Nagakawa (0–3) | **Kroon** (8) | 29,707 | 25–10–3 |
| 39 | May 19 | @ Fighters | 16–6 | Yagi (4–0) | **Takahashi** (2–1) | | 33,050 | 25–11–3 |
| 40 | May 20 | @ Fighters | 6–5 | Hayashi (1–0) | **Greisinger** (5–3) | Takeda (10) | 33,602 | 25–12–3 |
| 41 | May 22 | @ Eagles | 2–12 | **Gonzalez** (4–0) | Nagai (3–2) | | 20,170 | 26–12–3 |
| 42 | May 23 | @ Eagles | 1–7 | **Utsumi** (1–3) | Iwakuma (5–2) | | 20,599 | 27–12–3 |
| 43 | May 24 | Buffaloes | 6–8 | Hirano (1–1) | **Tono** (2–3) | | 42,110 | 27–13–3 |
| 44 | May 25 | Buffaloes | 6–2 | **Takahashi** (3–1) | Kondo (3–4) | | 40,057 | 28–13–3 |
| 45 | May 27 | Hawks | 3–5 | Houlton (3–3) | **Greisinger** (5–4) | Mahara (9) | 43,050 | 28–14–3 |
| 46 | May 28 | Hawks | 8–2 | **Gonzalez** (5–0) | Wada (3–3) | | 42,218 | 29–14–3 |
| 47 | May 30 | @ Lions | 2–2 (12) | Game tied after 12 innings | | | 33,778 | 29–14–4 |
| 48 | May 31 | @ Lions | 3–2 (10) | Onodera (2–2) | **Kroon** (0–1) | | 33,173 | 29–15–4 |

June

| # | Date | Opponent | Score | Win | Loss | Save | Attendance | Record |
|---|---|---|---|---|---|---|---|---|
| 49 | June 2 | @ Marines | 0–0 (12) | Game tied after 12 innings | | | 25,249 | 29–15–5 |
| 50 | June 3 | @Marines | | | | | | |
| 51 | June 5 | Fighters | | | | | | |
| 52 | June 6 | Fighters | | | | | | |
| 53 | June 7 | Eagles | | | | | | |
| 54 | June 8 | Eagles | | | | | | |
| 55 | June 10 | @Buffaloes | | | | | | |
| 56 | June 11 | @Buffaloes | | | | | | |
| 57 | June 13 | @Hawks | | | | | | |
| 58 | June 14 | @Hawks | | | | | | |
| 59 | June 16 | Lions | | | | | | |
| 60 | June 17 | Lions | | | | | | |
| 61 | June 20 | Marines | | | | | | |
| 62 | June 21 | Marines | | | | | | |
| 63 | June 26 | Swallows | | | | | | |
| 64 | June 27 | Swallows | | | | | | |
| 65 | June 28 | Swallows | | | | | | |
| 66 | June 30 | @ Carp | 4–3 | | | | | |

July

| # | Date | Opponent | Score | Win | Loss | Save | Attendance | Record |
|---|---|---|---|---|---|---|---|---|
| 67 | July 1 | Carp | | | | | | |
| 68 | July 2 | Carp | | | | | | |
| 69 | July 3 | @Dragons | | | | | | |
| 70 | July 4 | @Dragons | | | | | | |
| 71 | July 5 | @Dragons | | | | | | |
| 72 | July 7 | BayStars | | | | | | |
| 73 | July 8 | BayStars | | | | | | |
| 74 | July 9 | BayStars | | | | | | |
| 75 | July 10 | @Tigers | | | | | | |
| 76 | July 11 | @Tigers | | | | | | |
| 77 | July 12 | @Tigers | | | | | | |
| 78 | July 14 | @Swallows | | | | | | |
| 79 | July 15 | @Swallows | | | | | | |
| 80 | July 17 | Tigers | | | | | | |
| 81 | July 18 | Tigers | | | | | | |
| 82 | July 19 | Tigers | | | | | | |
| 83 | July 20 | @BayStars | | | | | | |
| 84 | July 21 | @BayStars | | | | | | |
| 85 | July 22 | @BayStars | | | | | | |
| 86 | July 28 | Dragons | | | | | | |
| 87 | July 29 | Dragons | | | | | | |
| 88 | July 30 | Dragons | | | | | | |
| 89 | July 31 | @Tigers | | | | | | |

August

| # | Date | Opponent | Score | Win | Loss | Save | Attendance | Record |
|---|---|---|---|---|---|---|---|---|
| 90 | August 1 | @Tigers | | | | | | |
| 91 | August 2 | @Tigers | | | | | | |
| 92 | August 4 | Carp | | | | | | |
| 93 | August 5 | Carp | | | | | | |
| 94 | August 7 | Swallows | | | | | | |
| 95 | August 8 | Swallows | | | | | | |
| 96 | August 9 | Swallows | | | | | | |
| 97 | August 11 | @Carp | | | | | | |
| 98 | August 12 | @Carp | | | | | | |
| 99 | August 13 | @Carp | | | | | | |
| 100 | August 14 | Tigers | | | | | | |
| 101 | August 15 | Tigers | | | | | | |
| 102 | August 16 | Tigers | | | | | | |
| 103 | August 18 | BayStars | | | | | | |
| 104 | August 19 | BayStars | | | | | | |
| 105 | August 20 | BayStars | | | | | | |
| 106 | August 21 | @Swallows | | | | | | |
| 107 | August 22 | @Swallows | | | | | | |
| 108 | August 23 | @Swallows | | | | | | |
| 109 | August 25 | @Dragons | | | | | | |
| 110 | August 26 | @Dragons | | | | | | |
| 111 | August 27 | @Dragons | | | | | | |
| 112 | August 28 | @Tigers | | | | | | |
| 113 | August 29 | @Tigers | | | | | | |
| 114 | August 30 | @Tigers | | | | | | |

September

| # | Date | Opponent | Score | Win | Loss | Save | Attendance | Record |
|---|---|---|---|---|---|---|---|---|
| 115 | September 1 | BayStars | | | | | | |
| 116 | September 2 | BayStars | | | | | | |
| 117 | September 4 | Swallows | | | | | | |
| 118 | September 5 | Swallows | | | | | | |
| 119 | September 6 | Swallows | | | | | | |
| 120 | September 8 | @BayStars | | | | | | |
| 121 | September 9 | @BayStars | | | | | | |
| 122 | September 10 | @BayStars | | | | | | |
| 123 | September 11 | @Carp | | | | | | |
| 124 | September 12 | @Carp | | | | | | |
| 125 | September 13 | @Carp | | | | | | |
| 126 | September 15 | Tigers | | | | | | |
| 127 | September 16 | Tigers | | | | | | |
| 128 | September 17 | Tigers | | | | | | |
| 129 | September 18 | @Swallows | | | | | | |
| 130 | September 19 | @Swallows | | | | | | |
| 131 | September 20 | @Swallows | | | | | | |
| 132 | September 21 | Dragons | | | | | | |
| 133 | September 22 | Dragons | | | | | | |
| 134 | September 23 | Dragons | | | | | | |
| 135 | September 25 | Carp | | | | | | |
| 136 | September 26 | Carp | | | | | | |
| 137 | September 27 | Carp | | | | | | |
| 138 | September 28 | @Dragons | | | | | | |
| 139 | September 29 | @Dragons | | | | | | |
| 140 | September 30 | @Dragons | | | | | | |

=== Roster ===
2009 Yomiuri Giants
**Roster**
| **Pitchers**: 37 Soichi Fujita; 60 Takuya Fukata; 59 Satoshi Fukuda; 57 Yuki Furukawa; 49 Dicky Gonzalez; 29 Seth Greisinger; 28 Norihito Kaneto; 92 Shota Kimura; 41 Hiroshi Kisanuki; 42 Marc Kroon; 11 Yuya Kubo; 36 Micheal Nakamura; 30 Kentaro Nishimura; 33 Takahiko Nomaguchi; 91 Wirfin Obispo; 22 Daisuke Ochi; 21 Hisanori Takahashi; 68 Masafumi Togano; 17 Shun Tono; 20 Kiyoshi Toyoda; 26 Tetsuya Utsumi; 47 Tetsuya Yamaguchi | **Catchers**: 10 Shinnosuke Abe; 58 Takanori Hoshi; 40 Ken Kato; 43 Kazunari Tsuruoka; **Infielders**: 13 Edgardo Alfonzo; 51 Shigeyuki Furuki; 52 Manabu Iwadate; 0 Takuya Kimura; 25 Lee Seung-Yeop; 61 Daisuke Nakai; 45 Masakuni Odajima; 2 Michihiro Ogasawara; 44 Noriyoshi Omichi; 55 Taishi Ota; 6 Hayato Sakamoto; 00 Takayuki Terauchi; 32 Hidetoshi Tsuburaya; 23 Ryota Wakiya | **Outfielders**: 69 Tomoya Inzen; 50 Ryuichi Kajimae; 9 Yoshiyuki Kamei; 35 Takahito Kudo; 64 Tetsuya Matsumoto; 5 Alex Ramírez; 12 Takahiro Suzuki; 24 Yoshinobu Takahashi; 66 Daijiro Tanaka; 8 Yoshitomo Tani; 48 Kenji Yano | **Manager**: 88 Tatsunori Hara |

== Postseason ==
=== Climax Series ===
==== Stage 2 ====
Game 1

| Team | 1 | 2 | 3 | 4 | 5 | 6 | 7 | 8 | 9 | R | H | E |
|---|---|---|---|---|---|---|---|---|---|---|---|---|
| Chunichi | 5 | 0 | 1 | 0 | 0 | 1 | 0 | 0 | 0 | 7 | 10 | 0 |
| Yomiuri | 0 | 1 | 0 | 0 | 0 | 0 | 1 | 0 | 0 | 2 | 5 | 0 |
WP: Takashi Ogasawara (1–0) LP: Dicky Gonzalez (0–1); Home runs: CHU: Kei Nomoto (1), Tony Blanco (1); YOM: None

Game 2

| Team | 1 | 2 | 3 | 4 | 5 | 6 | 7 | 8 | 9 | R | H | E |
|---|---|---|---|---|---|---|---|---|---|---|---|---|
| Chunichi | 2 | 0 | 0 | 0 | 0 | 0 | 0 | 2 | 0 | 4 | 8 | 0 |
| Yomiuri | 1 | 0 | 1 | 3 | 1 | 0 | 0 | 0 | X | 6 | 15 | 0 |
WP: Wirfin Obispo (1–0) LP: Chen Wei-Yin (0–1) Sv: Marc Kroon (1); Home runs: CHU: Masahiko Morino (1), Atsushi Fujii (1); YOM: Shinnosuke Abe (1)

Game 3

| Team | 1 | 2 | 3 | 4 | 5 | 6 | 7 | 8 | 9 | R | H | E |
|---|---|---|---|---|---|---|---|---|---|---|---|---|
| Chunichi | 2 | 0 | 0 | 0 | 0 | 0 | 2 | 0 | 0 | 4 | 8 | 1 |
| Yomiuri | 0 | 0 | 0 | 0 | 0 | 2 | 0 | 3 | X | 5 | 10 | 0 |
WP: Kiyoshi Toyoda (1–0) LP: Takuya Asao (0–1) Sv: Marc Kroon (2); Home runs: CHU: Masahiko Morino (2); YOM: Alex Ramírez (1), Yoshiyuki Kamei (1)

Game 4

| Team | 1 | 2 | 3 | 4 | 5 | 6 | 7 | 8 | 9 | R | H | E |
|---|---|---|---|---|---|---|---|---|---|---|---|---|
| Chunichi | 0 | 0 | 0 | 1 | 1 | 0 | 0 | 0 | 0 | 2 | 6 | 1 |
| Yomiuri | 2 | 0 | 5 | 0 | 0 | 1 | 0 | 0 | X | 8 | 9 | 1 |
WP: Daisuke Ochi (1–0) LP: Kenichi Nakata (0–1); Home runs: CHU: Tony Blanco (2); YOM: Yoshitomo Tani (1)

=== Japan Series ===
==== Game 1 ====
| Team | 1 | 2 | 3 | 4 | 5 | 6 | 7 | 8 | 9 | R | H | E |
|---|---|---|---|---|---|---|---|---|---|---|---|---|
| Yomiuri | 0 | 1 | 0 | 0 | 2 | 0 | 1 | 0 | 0 | 4 | 8 | 0 |
| Nippon-Ham | 0 | 1 | 0 | 0 | 0 | 1 | 0 | 0 | 1 | 3 | 12 | 0 |
WP: Dicky Gonzalez (1–0) LP: Masaru Takeda (0–1) Sv: Marc Kroon (1); Home runs: YOM: Yoshitomo Tani (1); NIP: Terrmel Sledge (1)

==== Game 2 ====
| Team | 1 | 2 | 3 | 4 | 5 | 6 | 7 | 8 | 9 | R | H | E |
|---|---|---|---|---|---|---|---|---|---|---|---|---|
| Yomiuri | 0 | 0 | 0 | 2 | 0 | 0 | 0 | 0 | 0 | 2 | 8 | 0 |
| Nippon-Ham | 0 | 0 | 4 | 0 | 0 | 0 | 0 | 0 | x | 4 | 12 | 0 |
WP: Yu Darvish (1–0) LP: Tetsuya Utsumi (0–1) Sv: Hisashi Takeda (1); Home runs: YOM: Yoshiyuki Kamei (1); NIP: Atsunori Inaba (1)

==== Game 3 ====
| Team | 1 | 2 | 3 | 4 | 5 | 6 | 7 | 8 | 9 | R | H | E |
|---|---|---|---|---|---|---|---|---|---|---|---|---|
| Nippon-Ham | 1 | 1 | 0 | 0 | 1 | 0 | 0 | 1 | 0 | 4 | 4 | 0 |
| Yomiuri | 0 | 2 | 1 | 0 | 2 | 0 | 0 | 2 | X | 7 | 8 | 3 |
WP: Wirfin Obispo (1–0) LP: Keisaku Itokazu (0–1) Sv: Marc Kroon (2); Home runs: NIP: Atsunori Inaba (2), Eiichi Koyano (1), Kensuke Tanaka (1); YOM: Lee Seung-Yeop (1), Shinnosuke Abe (1), Michihiro Ogasawara (1)

==== Game 4 ====
| Team | 1 | 2 | 3 | 4 | 5 | 6 | 7 | 8 | 9 | R | H | E |
|---|---|---|---|---|---|---|---|---|---|---|---|---|
| Nippon-Ham | 0 | 0 | 4 | 0 | 1 | 0 | 2 | 1 | 0 | 8 | 11 | 1 |
| Yomiuri | 0 | 0 | 1 | 0 | 0 | 0 | 0 | 3 | 0 | 4 | 13 | 0 |
WP: Yagi (1–0) LP: Takahashi (0–1) Sv: Takeda (2); Home runs: NIP: Shinji Takahashi (1); YOM: Ramírez (1)

==== Game 5 ====
| Team | 1 | 2 | 3 | 4 | 5 | 6 | 7 | 8 | 9 | R | H | E |
|---|---|---|---|---|---|---|---|---|---|---|---|---|
| Nippon-Ham | 0 | 1 | 0 | 0 | 0 | 0 | 0 | 0 | 1 | 2 | 4 | 1 |
| Yomiuri | 0 | 0 | 0 | 0 | 0 | 0 | 0 | 1 | 2 | 3 | 7 | 2 |
WP: Yamaguchi, (1-0) LP: H. Takeda, (0-1); Home runs: NIP: Takahashi (2); YOM: Kamei (2), Abe (2)

==== Game 6 ====
| Team | 1 | 2 | 3 | 4 | 5 | 6 | 7 | 8 | 9 | R | H | E |
|---|---|---|---|---|---|---|---|---|---|---|---|---|
| Yomiuri | 0 | 1 | 0 | 0 | 0 | 1 | 0 | 0 | 0 | 2 | 6 | 0 |
| Nippon-Ham | 0 | 0 | 0 | 0 | 0 | 0 | 0 | 0 | 0 | 0 | 11 | 1 |
WP: Tetsuya Utsumi (1–1) LP: Masaru Takeda (0-2) Sv: Marc Kroon (3)

== Player statistics ==
=== Batting ===
| Player | G | AB | R | H | 2B | 3B | HR | RBI | AVG | SB |
|---|---|---|---|---|---|---|---|---|---|---|
| Shinnosuke Abe | 123 | 409 | 63 | 120 | 20 | 3 | 32 | 76 | .293 | 1 |
| Edgardo Alfonzo | 21 | 41 | 3 | 6 | 0 | 0 | 2 | 4 | .146 | 0 |
| Satoshi Fukuda | 9 | 16 | 1 | 1 | 0 | 0 | 0 | 0 | .063 | 0 |
| Shigeyuki Furuki | 77 | 179 | 14 | 45 | 5 | 1 | 2 | 18 | .251 | 3 |
| Dicky Gonzalez | 23 | 50 | 3 | 13 | 1 | 0 | 0 | 6 | .260 | 0 |
| Seth Greisinger | 25 | 48 | 1 | 6 | 1 | 0 | 0 | 2 | .125 | 0 |
| Takanori Hoshi | 9 | 5 | 0 | 0 | 0 | 0 | 0 | 0 | .000 | 0 |
| Tomoya Inzen | 3 | 2 | 0 | 0 | 0 | 0 | 0 | 0 | .000 | 0 |
| Ryuichi Kajimae | 14 | 7 | 0 | 0 | 0 | 0 | 0 | 0 | .000 | 0 |
| Yoshiyuki Kamei | 134 | 490 | 79 | 142 | 25 | 4 | 25 | 71 | .290 | 12 |
| Ken Kato | 12 | 10 | 2 | 2 | 1 | 0 | 0 | 0 | .200 | 0 |
| Shota Kimura | 25 | 2 | 0 | 1 | 0 | 0 | 0 | 0 | .500 | 0 |
| Takuya Kimura | 86 | 186 | 17 | 43 | 8 | 0 | 2 | 16 | .231 | 1 |
| Hiroshi Kisanuki | 1 | 1 | 0 | 0 | 0 | 0 | 0 | 0 | .000 | 0 |
| Yuya Kubo | 7 | 8 | 0 | 0 | 0 | 0 | 0 | 0 | .000 | 0 |
| Takahito Kudo | 49 | 51 | 12 | 13 | 2 | 1 | 0 | 1 | .255 | 1 |
| Lee Seung-Yeop | 77 | 223 | 33 | 51 | 9 | 0 | 16 | 36 | .229 | 1 |
| Tetsuya Matsumoto | 129 | 372 | 55 | 109 | 11 | 1 | 0 | 15 | .293 | 16 |
| Daisuke Nakai | 18 | 30 | 2 | 7 | 2 | 0 | 1 | 6 | .233 | 2 |
| Micheal Nakamura | 29 | 1 | 0 | 0 | 0 | 0 | 0 | 0 | .000 | 0 |
| Takahiko Nomaguchi | 25 | 2 | 0 | 0 | 0 | 0 | 0 | 0 | .000 | 0 |
| Wirfin Obispo | 14 | 19 | 0 | 2 | 1 | 0 | 0 | 1 | .105 | 0 |
| Daisuke Ochi | 66 | 3 | 0 | 0 | 0 | 0 | 0 | 0 | .000 | 0 |
| Masakuni Odajima | 10 | 21 | 1 | 4 | 0 | 0 | 1 | 3 | .190 | 0 |
| Michihiro Ogasawara | 139 | 514 | 78 | 159 | 25 | 1 | 31 | 107 | .309 | 2 |
| Noriyoshi Omichi | 37 | 35 | 1 | 9 | 1 | 0 | 0 | 3 | .257 | 0 |
| Taishi Ota | 3 | 1 | 0 | 0 | 0 | 0 | 0 | 0 | .000 | 0 |
| Alex Ramírez | 144 | 577 | 66 | 186 | 35 | 0 | 31 | 103 | .322 | 4 |
| Hayato Sakamoto | 141 | 581 | 87 | 178 | 33 | 3 | 18 | 62 | .306 | 5 |
| Takahiro Suzuki | 122 | 202 | 40 | 53 | 5 | 1 | 1 | 8 | .262 | 25 |
| Hisanori Takahashi | 25 | 39 | 3 | 5 | 0 | 0 | 0 | 0 | .128 | 0 |
| Yoshinobu Takahashi | 1 | 1 | 0 | 0 | 0 | 0 | 0 | 0 | .000 | 0 |
| Daijiro Tanaka | 5 | 12 | 0 | 1 | 0 | 0 | 0 | 0 | .083 | 0 |
| Yoshitomo Tani | 101 | 287 | 35 | 95 | 23 | 1 | 11 | 48 | .331 | 3 |
| Takayuki Terauchi | 78 | 84 | 7 | 14 | 2 | 0 | 1 | 1 | .167 | 2 |
| Masafumi Togano | 5 | 1 | 0 | 0 | 0 | 0 | 0 | 0 | .000 | 0 |
| Shun Tono | 27 | 44 | 1 | 4 | 1 | 0 | 0 | 0 | .091 | 0 |
| Hidetoshi Tsuburaya | 1 | 2 | 1 | 1 | 0 | 0 | 1 | 4 | .500 | 0 |
| Kazunari Tsuruoka | 59 | 142 | 17 | 37 | 10 | 0 | 5 | 18 | .261 | 1 |
| Tetsuya Utsumi | 27 | 50 | 2 | 5 | 0 | 0 | 0 | 1 | .100 | 0 |
| Ryota Wakiya | 89 | 231 | 26 | 62 | 7 | 2 | 2 | 16 | .268 | 5 |
| Tetsuya Yamaguchi | 73 | 3 | 0 | 0 | 0 | 0 | 0 | 0 | .000 | 0 |
| Kenji Yano | 6 | 9 | 0 | 1 | 0 | 0 | 0 | 0 | .111 | 0 |

Indicates CL leader in the category

| Player | W | L | ERA | G | Win% | SV | IP | R | ER | BB | K |
|---|---|---|---|---|---|---|---|---|---|---|---|
| Soichi Fujita | 1 | 0 | 2.08 | 19 | 1.000 | 0 | 17 1/3 | 5 | 4 | 1 | 10 |
| Takuya Fukata | 0 | 0 | 9.00 | 8 | .000 | 0 | 4 | 4 | 4 | 1 | 4 |
| Satoshi Fukuda | 2 | 0 | 3.48 | 9 | 1.000 | 0 | 44 | 24 | 17 | 17 | 31 |
| Yuki Furukawa | 0 | 0 | 4.50 | 6 | .000 | 0 | 4 | 2 | 2 | 2 | 0 |
| Dicky Gonzalez | 15 | 2 | 2.11 | 23 | .882 | 0 | 162 | 42 | 38 | 25 | 113 |
| Seth Greisinger | 13 | 6 | 3.47 | 25 | .684 | 0 | 161 | 77 | 62 | 26 | 91 |
| Norihito Kaneto | 1 | 0 | 3.60 | 6 | 1.000 | 0 | 5 | 2 | 2 | 1 | 3 |
| Shota Kimura | 0 | 0 | 3.38 | 25 | .000 | 0 | 29 1/3 | 13 | 11 | 12 | 23 |
| Hiroshi Kisanuki | 0 | 0 | 10.13 | 1 | .000 | 0 | 2 2/3 | 3 | 3 | 0 | 2 |
| Marc Kroon | 1 | 3 | 1.26 | 46 | .250 | 27 | 50 | 10 | 7 | 19 | 57 |
| Yuya Kubo | 1 | 0 | 3.29 | 7 | 1.000 | 0 | 27 1/3 | 10 | 10 | 10 | 25 |
| Micheal Nakamura | 1 | 2 | 6.18 | 29 | .333 | 0 | 27 2/3 | 19 | 19 | 9 | 28 |
| Kentaro Nishimura | 2 | 0 | 4.97 | 11 | 1.000 | 0 | 12 2/3 | 9 | 7 | 5 | 10 |
| Takahiko Nomaguchi | 0 | 1 | 4.97 | 25 | .000 | 1 | 29 | 16 | 16 | 20 | 28 |
| Wirfin Obispo | 6 | 1 | 2.45 | 14 | .857 | 0 | 58 2/3 | 16 | 16 | 11 | 48 |
| Daisuke Ochi | 8 | 3 | 3.30 | 66 | .727 | 10 | 71 | 28 | 26 | 20 | 70 |
| Hisanori Takahashi | 10 | 6 | 2.94 | 25 | .625 | 0 | 144 | 58 | 47 | 36 | 126 |
| Masafumi Togano | 0 | 0 | 4.05 | 5 | .000 | 0 | 6 2/3 | 3 | 3 | 3 | 4 |
| Shun Tono | 8 | 8 | 3.17 | 27 | .500 | 0 | 153 1/3 | 61 | 54 | 57 | 133 |
| Kiyoshi Toyoda | 2 | 2 | 1.99 | 46 | .500 | 5 | 40 2/3 | 13 | 9 | 15 | 32 |
| Tetsuya Utsumi | 9 | 11 | 2.96 | 27 | .450 | 0 | 179 2/3 | 66 | 59 | 36 | 115 |
| Tetsuya Yamaguchi | 9 | 1 | 1.27 | 73 | .900 | 4 | 78 | 12 | 11 | 14 | 62 |

Indicates CL leader in the category
