= 2010 Central League Climax Series =

First stage
Team (Wins)		Manager	Season
Yomiuri Giants (2)		Tatsunori Hara	79–64–1 (.552), 1 GB
Hanshin Tigers (0)		Akinobu Mayumi	78–63–3 (.553), 1 GB
- Dates: October 16–17

Final stage
Team (Wins)		Manager	Season
Chunichi Dragons (4)		Hiromitsu Ochiai	79–62–3 (.560), 1 GA
Yomiuri Giants (1)		Tatsunori Hara	79–64–1 (.552), 1 GB
- Dates: October 20–23
- MVP: Kazuhiro Wada (Chunichi)

The 2010 Central League Climax Series (CLCS) consisted of two consecutive series, Stage 1 being a best-of-three series and Stage 2 being a best-of-six with the top seed being awarded a one-win advantage. The winner of the series advanced to the 2010 Japan Series, where they competed against the 2010 Pacific League Climax Series (PLCS) winner. The top three regular-season finishers played in the two series. The CLCS began on with the first game of Stage 1 on October 16 and ended with the final game of Stage 2 on October 23.

== First stage ==
=== Summary ===
Yomiuri Giants won the series, 2–0.

Game	Date	Score	Location	Time	Attendance
1	October 16	Yomiuri Giants – 3, Hanshin Tigers – 1	Koshien Stadium	3:09	46,868
2	October 17	Yomiuri Giants – 7, Hanshin Tigers – 6	Koshien Stadium	3:46	46,875

=== Game 1 ===
Saturday, October 16, 2010, 2:00 pm (JST) at Koshien Stadium in Nishinomiya, Hyōgo Prefecture
Team	1	2	3	4	5	6	7	8	9	R	H	E
Yomiuri	0	0	2	0	1	0	0	0	0	3	10	0
Hanshin	0	1	0	0	0	0	0	0	0	1	5	1
WP: Shun Tono (1–0) LP: Atsushi Nomi (0–1) Sv: Tetsuya Yamaguchi (1); Home runs: YOM: Hayato Sakamoto (1); HAN: Craig Brazell (1)

=== Game 2 ===
Sunday, October 17, 2010, 2:00 pm (JST) at Koshien Stadium in Nishinomiya, Hyōgo Prefecture
Team	1	2	3	4	5	6	7	8	9	R	H	E
Yomiuri	0	0	0	0	2	0	3	2	0	7	14	1
Hanshin	2	0	1	0	1	2	0	0	0	6	10	2
WP: Daisuke Ochi (1–0) LP: Kyuji Fujikawa (0–1) Sv: Tetsuya Yamaguchi (2); Home runs: YOM: Yoshinobu Takahashi (1); HAN: None

== Final stage ==
=== Summary ===
Chunichi Dragons won the series, 4–1*.

Game	Date	Score	Location	Time	Attendance
1	October 20	Yomiuri Giants – 0, Chunichi Dragons – 5	Nagoya Dome	3:30	37,659
2	October 21	Yomiuri Giants – 0, Chunichi Dragons – 2	Nagoya Dome	2:53	37,298
3	October 22	Yomiuri Giants – 3, Chunichi Dragons – 2	Nagoya Dome	3:03	38,432
4	October 23	Yomiuri Giants – 3, Chunichi Dragons – 4	Nagoya Dome	3:57	38,432

* The Central League regular season champion is given a one-game advantage in the Final Stage.

=== Game 1 ===
Wednesday, October 20, 2010, 6:00 pm (JST) at Nagoya Dome in Nagoya, Aichi Prefecture
Team	1	2	3	4	5	6	7	8	9	R	H	E
Yomiuri	0	0	0	0	0	0	0	0	0	0	8	0
Chunichi	4	0	0	0	0	0	1	0	X	5	12	1
WP: Wei-Yin Chen (1–0) LP: Shun Tono (0–1)

=== Game 2 ===
Thursday, October 21, 2010, 6:00 pm (JST) at Nagoya Dome in Nagoya, Aichi Prefecture
Team	1	2	3	4	5	6	7	8	9	R	H	E
Yomiuri	0	0	0	0	0	0	0	0	0	0	5	0
Chunichi	0	1	1	0	0	0	0	0	X	2	6	0
WP: Kazuki Yoshimi (1–0) LP: Tetsuya Utsumi (0–1) Sv: Takuya Asao (1)

=== Game 3 ===
Friday, October 22, 2010, 6:00 pm (JST) at Nagoya Dome in Nagoya, Aichi Prefecture
Team	1	2	3	4	5	6	7	8	9	R	H	E
Yomiuri	0	0	0	0	1	1	0	0	1	3	8	0
Chunichi	0	0	0	0	0	0	0	2	0	2	6	2
WP: Daisuke Ochi (1–0) LP: Hitoki Iwase (0–1) Sv: Tetsuya Yamaguchi (1); Home runs: YOM: Shinnosuke Abe (1); CHU: Kei Nomoto (1)

=== Game 4 ===
Saturday, October 23, 2010, 6:00 pm (JST) at Nagoya Dome in Nagoya, Aichi Prefecture
Team	1	2	3	4	5	6	7	8	9	R	H	E
Yomiuri	0	0	0	0	0	0	0	1	2	3	11	0
Chunichi	0	0	0	2	0	0	0	1	1X	4	8	0
WP: Takuya Asao (1–0) LP: Yuya Kubo (0–1)
