= 2009 KBO–NPB Club Championship =

The KBO–NPB Club Championship 2009 was contested between the champions of Nippon Professional Baseball's Japan Series, and the Korea Baseball Organization's Korean Series on Saturday, 14 November 2009. The game was played at the Nagasaki Baseball Stadium. The 2009 Championship was won by Japan's Yomiuri Giants.

== Game summary ==
Team	1	2	3	4	5	6	7	8	9	R	H	E
Yomiuri Giants	0	0	0	0	0	1	7	0	1	9	11	0
Kia Tigers	1	0	0	0	2	0	0	0	1	4	10	0
WP: Takahiko Nomaguchi LP: Kwak Jung-chul Sv: Wirfin Obispo; Home runs: YOM: Michihiro Ogasawara (1), Shinnosuke Abe (3); KIA: None
