= Yuya Kubo =

Yuya Kubo may refer to:

- Yuya Kubo (baseball) (born 1980)
- Yūya Kubo (footballer) (born 1993)
