= Furuki =

Furuki (written: 古木 or 古城) is a Japanese surname. Notable people with the surname include:

- Nozomi Furuki (古木 のぞみ, born 1988), Japanese voice actress
- Shigeyuki Furuki (古城 茂幸, born 1976), Japanese baseball player
