= Shota Kimura =

Shota Kimura may refer to:

- Shota Kimura (baseball) (木村 正太, born 1986), Japanese baseball player
- Shota Kimura (footballer) (木村 勝太, born 1988), Japanese footballer
