= Daijirō =

- Gender: Male

Origin
- Origin: Japanese
- Meaning: Different meanings depending on the kanji used

Daijirō, Daijiro or Daijirou (written: 大二郎, 大二朗, 大次郎 or 大治郎) is a masculine Japanese given name. Notable people with the name include:

- Daijiro Hashimoto (橋本 大二郎; born 1947), Japanese politician
- Daijiro Kato (加藤 大治郎; 1976–2003), Japanese motorcycle racer
- Daijiro Matsui (松井 大二郎; born 1972), Japanese mixed martial artist and professional wrestler
- Daijiro Morohoshi (諸星 大二郎; born 1949), Japanese manga artist
- Daijiro Murai (村井 大次郎; born 1962), Japanese rugby union player
- Daijiro Oishi (大石 大二郎; born 1958), Japanese baseball player
- Daijiro Takakuwa (高桑 大二朗; born 1973), Japanese footballer
- Daijiro Tanaka (田中 大二郎; born 1988), Japanese baseball player
- Daijiro Yoshihara (吉原 大二郎; born 1978), Japanese drifting driver
