= Seth Greisinger =

American baseball player (born 1975)

- Pitcher
- Born: July 29, 1975 (age 50); Kansas City, Kansas, U.S.
- Batted: Right Threw: Right

Professional debut
- MLB: June 3, 1998, for the Detroit Tigers
- NPB: 2008, for the Yomiuri Giants

Last appearance
- MLB: June 5, 2005, for the Atlanta Braves
- NPB: September 12, 2013, for the Chiba Lotte Marines

MLB statistics
- Win–loss record: 10–16
- Earned run average: 5.51
- Strikeouts: 118

NPB statistics
- Win–loss record: 64–42
- Earned run average: 3.16
- Strikeouts: 630
- Stats at Baseball Reference

Teams
- Detroit Tigers (1998, 2002); Minnesota Twins (2004); Atlanta Braves (2005); Kia Tigers (2005–2006); Tokyo Yakult Swallows (2007); Yomiuri Giants (2008–2011); Chiba Lotte Marines (2012–2013)

Career highlights and awards
- 2× Central League Wins Champion (2007, 2008); Central League Best Nine Award (2008); NPB All-Star (2007)
Medals
Men's baseball
Representing United States
Olympic Games
Bronze medal – third place	1996 Atlanta	Team competition

Seth Adam Greisinger (born July 29, 1975) is an American former professional baseball pitcher. He played in Major League Baseball from 1998–2005.

== Amateur career ==
Greisinger graduated from McLean High School in Virginia, then played his college ball at the University of Virginia. In 1994 and 1995, he played collegiate summer baseball with the Brewster Whitecaps of the Cape Cod Baseball League and was named a league all-star in 1995. He was selected by the Detroit Tigers in the first round of the 1996 MLB draft.

== Professional career ==
He played for the Tigers, Minnesota Twins, and Atlanta Braves. Greisinger missed nearly 4 seasons from 1998 to 2002 with arm ligament injuries. He was a non-roster invitee to spring training with the Washington Nationals in 2005; he was sent to the Braves as part of a conditional deal. After being released by the Braves on June 7, 2005, Greisinger played for the Kia Tigers of the KBO in 2006, going 14–12 with a 3.09 ERA in 29 games.

Greisinger became the ace for the Tokyo Yakult Swallows in the Central League in Japan for the 2007 season, but Yakult's low budget led to them being forced to release both Greisinger and outfielder Alex Ramirez. Greisinger signed with the Yomiuri Giants for the 2008 season and led the Central League in wins with 17. In 2009, Greisinger went 13–6 with a 3.47 ERA, but missed time near the end of the season due to inflammation in his right (pitching) elbow. He did not pitch at all in the postseason and missed the 2009 Japan Series.

Greisinger continued his next two seasons with the Yomiuri Giants with injury-plagued seasons. He finished the 2010 season with an 0–2 record and a 5.48 ERA in only six games. He pitched in nine games during the 2011 season and was 1–5 with a 4.15 ERA.

For the 2012 season, Greisinger pitched for the Chiba Lotte Marines and turned back the clock. He finished the season 12–8 with a 2.24 ERA in over 168 innings. During the 2013 campaign, he only pitched in 13 games and finished the season at 5–4 with a 4.54 ERA.

Through his seven seasons in Japan, Greisinger had a 64–42 record with a 3.16 ERA in 885 innings.

== International career ==
Greisinger was a member of the 1996 Summer Olympic baseball team, winning a bronze medal.

== Personal life ==
Greisinger married Joana Bennett in a ceremony in Florida. Joana is a Technology Consultant at Accenture and President of a Non-Profit Organization called One Vision One World.
