= Shota Kimura (baseball) =

Japanese baseball player (born 1986)

- Pitcher
- Born: May 24, 1986 (age 40); Ichinoseki, Iwate, Japan
- Batted: Right Threw: Right

NPB debut
- May 8, 2009, for the Yomiuri Giants

Last NPB appearance
- September 28, 2009, for the Yomiuri Giants

NPB statistics
- Win–loss: 0–0
- Earned run average: 3.38
- Strikeouts: 23

Teams
- Yomiuri Giants (2005–2011)

Career highlights and awards
- Japan Series champion (2009)
- Last updated on: 29 September 2026

Shota Kimura (木村 正太, Kimura Shōta; born May 24, 1986) is a Japanese former professional baseball pitcher. He played in Nippon Professional Baseball (NPB) for the Yomiuri Giants from 2005 to 2011.

== Career ==
In 2006, Kimura played in Hawaii Winter Baseball for the Honolulu Sharks, compiling an 0–3 record and 4.50 ERA with 17 strikeouts over 16 innings of work.

Kimura played in the Yomiuri Giants organization from 2005 to 2011; he would make his lone 25 appearances in Nippon Professional Baseball during the 2008 season, recording a 3.38 ERA with 23 strikeouts across 29 1/3 innings pitched.
