= Hiroshi Kisanuki =

Japanese baseball player

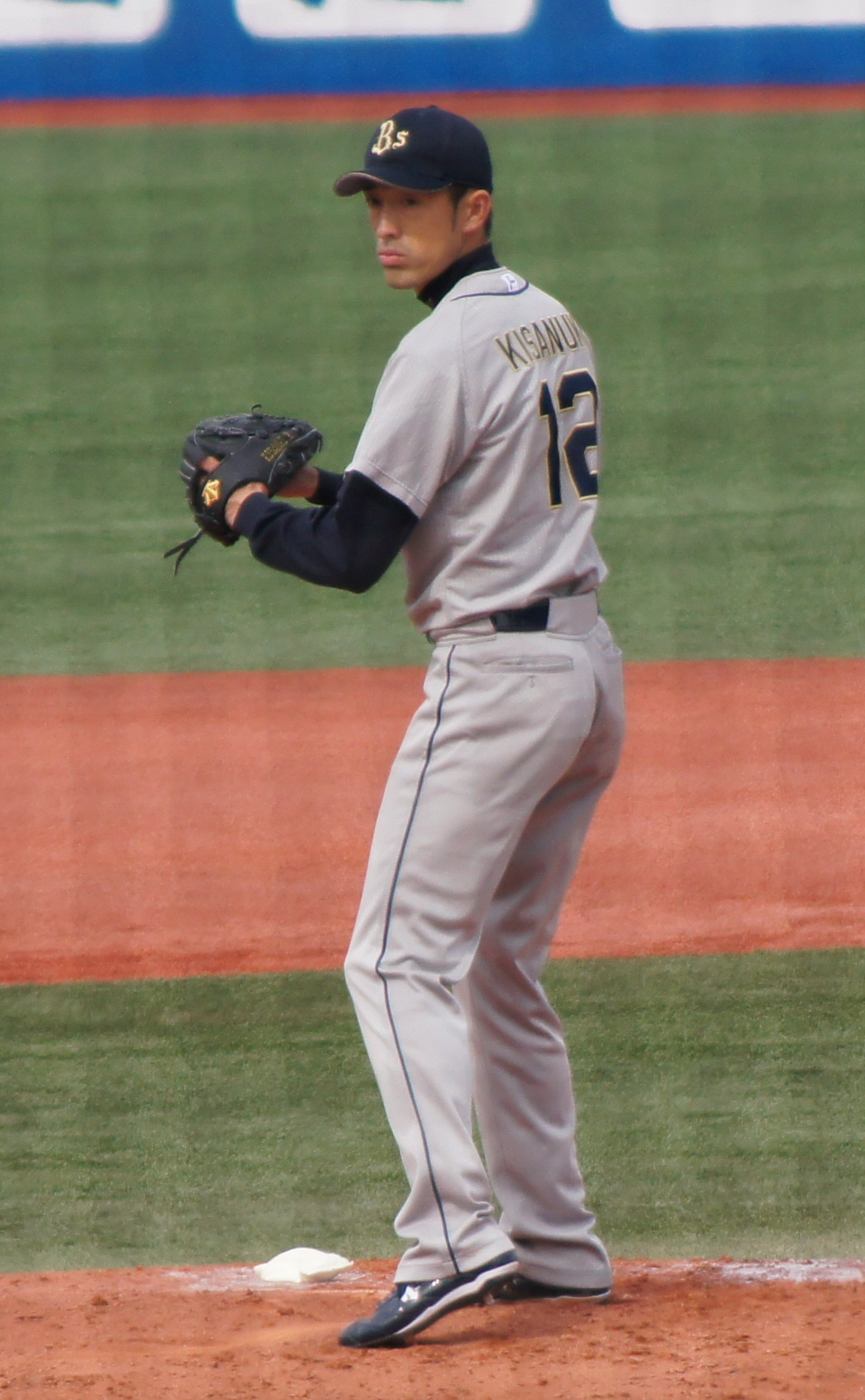
- Kisanuki with the Orix Buffaloes
- Pitcher
- Born: May 17, 1980 (age 45); Satsumasendai, Kagoshima, Japan
- Bats: Right Throws: Right

NPB debut
- 2003, for the Yomiuri Giants

NPB statistics (through 2015)
- Win–loss record: 63-73
- ERA: 3.75
- Strikeouts: 980
- Stats at Baseball Reference

Teams
- As player: Yomiuri Giants (2003–2009); Orix Buffaloes (2010–2012); Hokkaido Nippon-Ham Fighters (2013–2015); As coach: Yomiuri Giants (2019–2020)

Career highlights and awards
- 3× NPB All-Star (2003, 2010, 2013); 2003 Central League Rookie of the Year

Hiroshi Kisanuki (木佐貫 洋, born May 17, 1980) is a former Japanese professional baseball pitcher for the Hokkaido Nippon-Ham Fighters in Japan's Nippon Professional Baseball. He previously played for the Yomiuri Giants from 2003 to 2009. He won the Central League Rookie of the Year Award in 2003.
