= Kentaro Nishimura =

Japanese baseball player

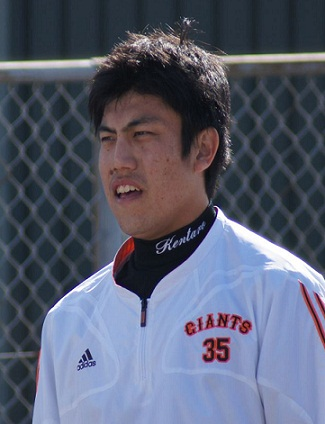
- Nishimura with the Yomiuri Giants

Yomiuri Giants
- Pitcher
- Born: May 10, 1985 (age 40); Hiroshima, Japan
- Batted: Right Threw: Right

NPB debut
- July 1, 2004, for the Yomiuri Giants

Last NPB appearance
- September 26, 2017, for the Yomiuri Giants

NPB statistics
- Win–loss: 38–34
- ERA: 3.12
- Strikeouts: 529
- Stats at Baseball Reference

Teams
- As player: Yomiuri Giants (2004–2018); As coach: Yomiuri Giants (2026–present)

Kentaro Nishimura (西村 健太朗, Nishimura Kentaro; born May 10, 1985) is a former Japanese Nippon Professional Baseball player. He played with the Yomiuri Giants in Japan's Central League.

On October 3, 2018, he announced retirement after the season.
