= Takanori Hoshi =

Japanese baseball player

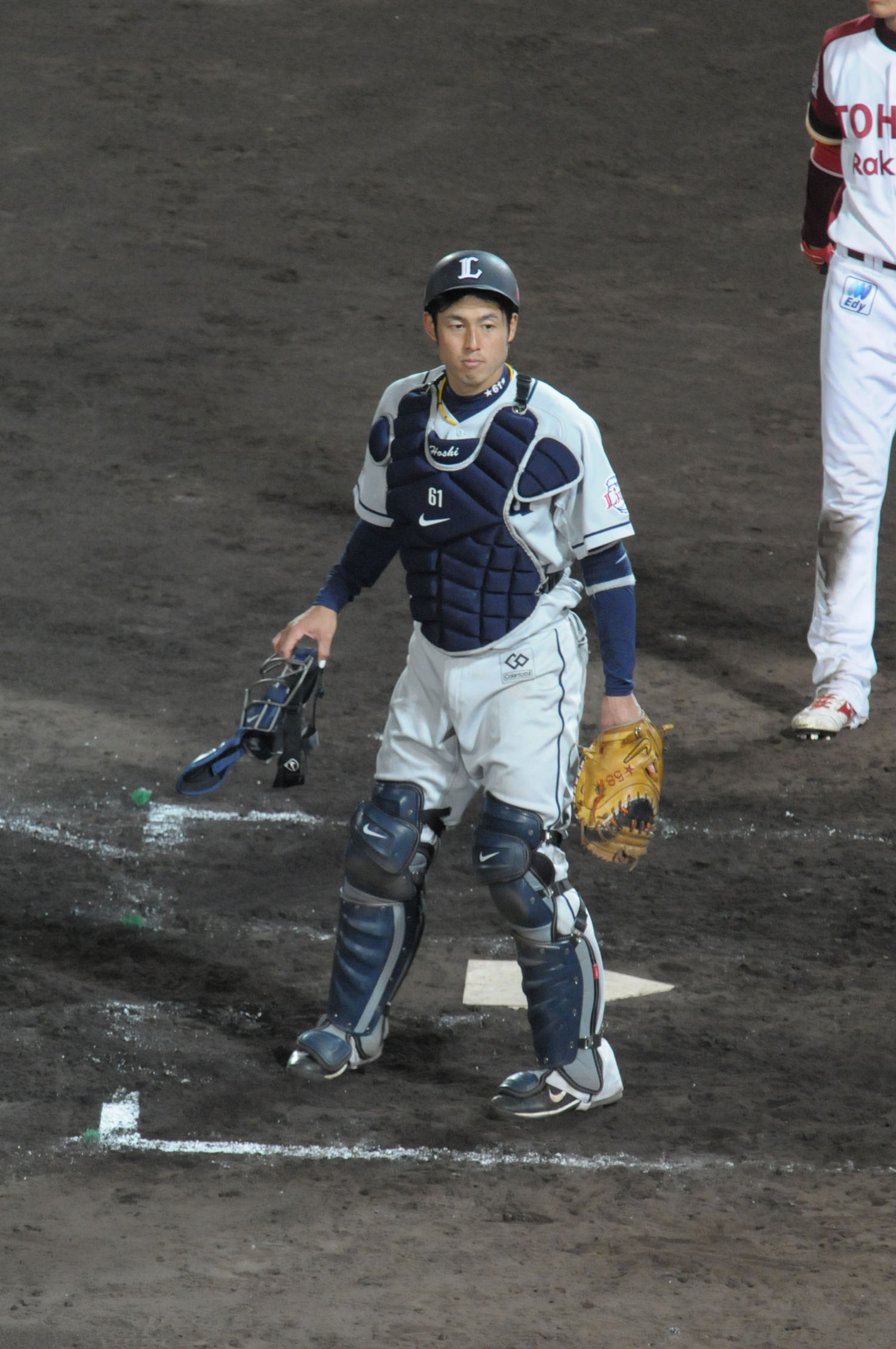
- Catcher/Coach
- Born: May 4, 1982 (age 44); Natori, Japan
- Batted: Right Threw: Right

NPB debut
- October 4, 2005, for the Yomiuri Giants

Last NPB appearance
- July 16, 2014, for the Saitama Seibu Lions

NPB statistics
- Batting average: .191
- Hits: 27
- RBI: 3
- Home runs: 0
- Stolen bases: 2
- Stats at Baseball Reference

Teams
- As player: Yomiuri Giants (2005–2009); Saitama Seibu Lions (2011–2016, 2019); As coach: Saitama Seibu Lions (2017–2019); Tohoku Rakuten Golden Eagles (2020–2022)

Takanori Hoshi (星 孝典, Hoshi Takanori; born May 4, 1982) is a former Japanese professional baseball catcher for the Yomiuri Giants and Saitama Seibu Lions of Nippon Professional Baseball. He was born in Natori, Miyagi, Japan.
