= Takahiko Nomaguchi =

Japanese baseball player

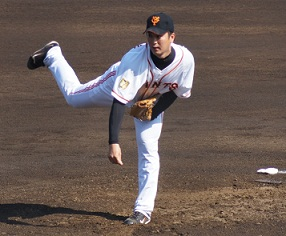
- Pitcher
- Born: May 31, 1983 (age 42); Amagasaki, Hyōgo, Japan
- Bats: Right Throws: Right

NPB debut
- May 1, 2005, for the Yomiuri Giants

NPB statistics (through 2009 season)
- Win–loss: 11–10
- ERA: 4.63
- Strikeouts: 148

Teams
- Yomiuri Giants (2005–2015)

Career highlights and awards
- 2009 Japan Series champion
- Last updated on: 8 December 2008

Takahiko Nomaguchi (野間口 貴彦, Nomaguchi Takahiko; born May 31, 1983 in Amagasaki, Hyōgo, Japan) is a Nippon Professional Baseball player for the Yomiuri Giants in Japan's Central League.
