= Masafumi Togano =

Japanese baseball player (born 1984)

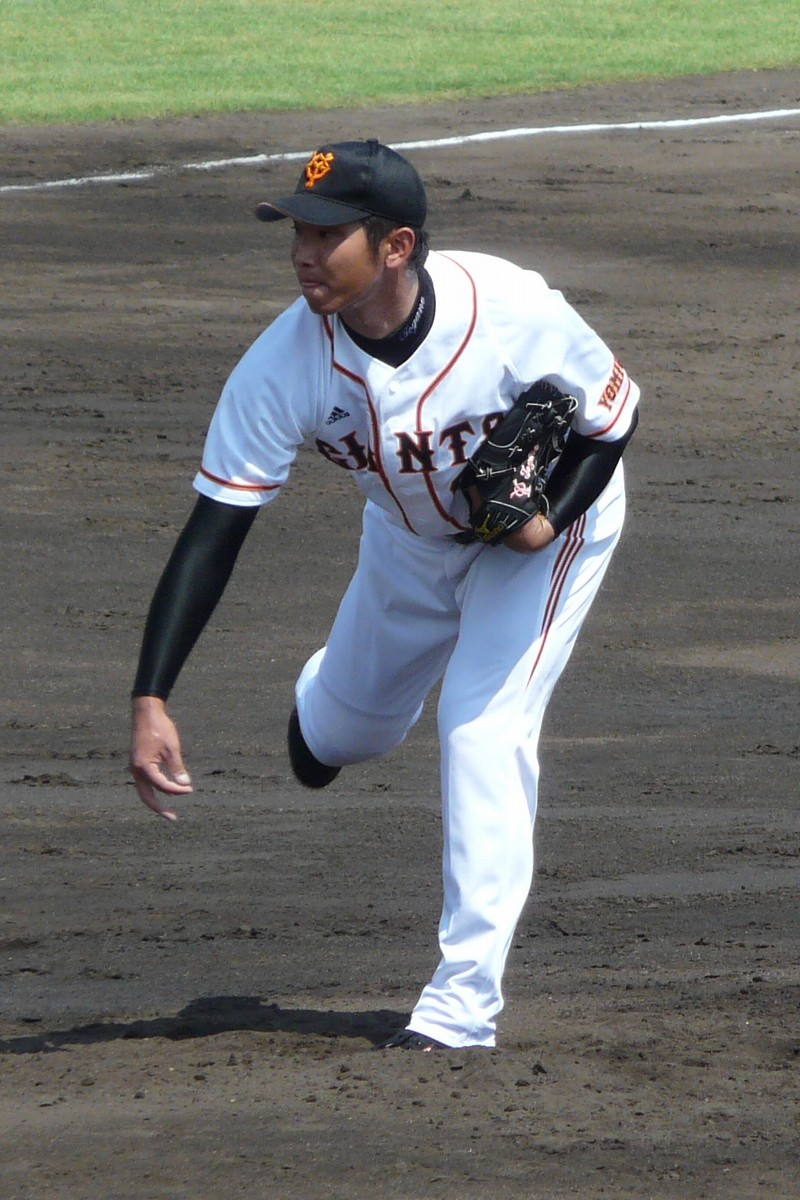
- Pitcher
- Born: October 19, 1984 (age 41); Tokyo, Japan
- Bats: Right Throws: Right

NPB debut
- May 23, 2006, for the Yomiuri Giants

NPB statistics (through 2008 season)
- Win–loss: 0–1
- ERA: 5.59
- Strikeouts: 16
- Stats at Baseball Reference

Teams
- Yomiuri Giants (2006 – 2010); Tohoku Rakuten Golden Eagles (2010 – 2011)
- Last updated on: 9 December 2008

Masafumi Togano (栂野 雅史, Togano Masafumi; born October 19, 1984 in Tokyo, Japan) is a Japanese Nippon Professional Baseball player. He is currently with the Tohoku Rakuten Golden Eagles in Japan's Pacific League.
