= Noriyoshi Omichi =

Japanese baseball player & coach (born 1969)

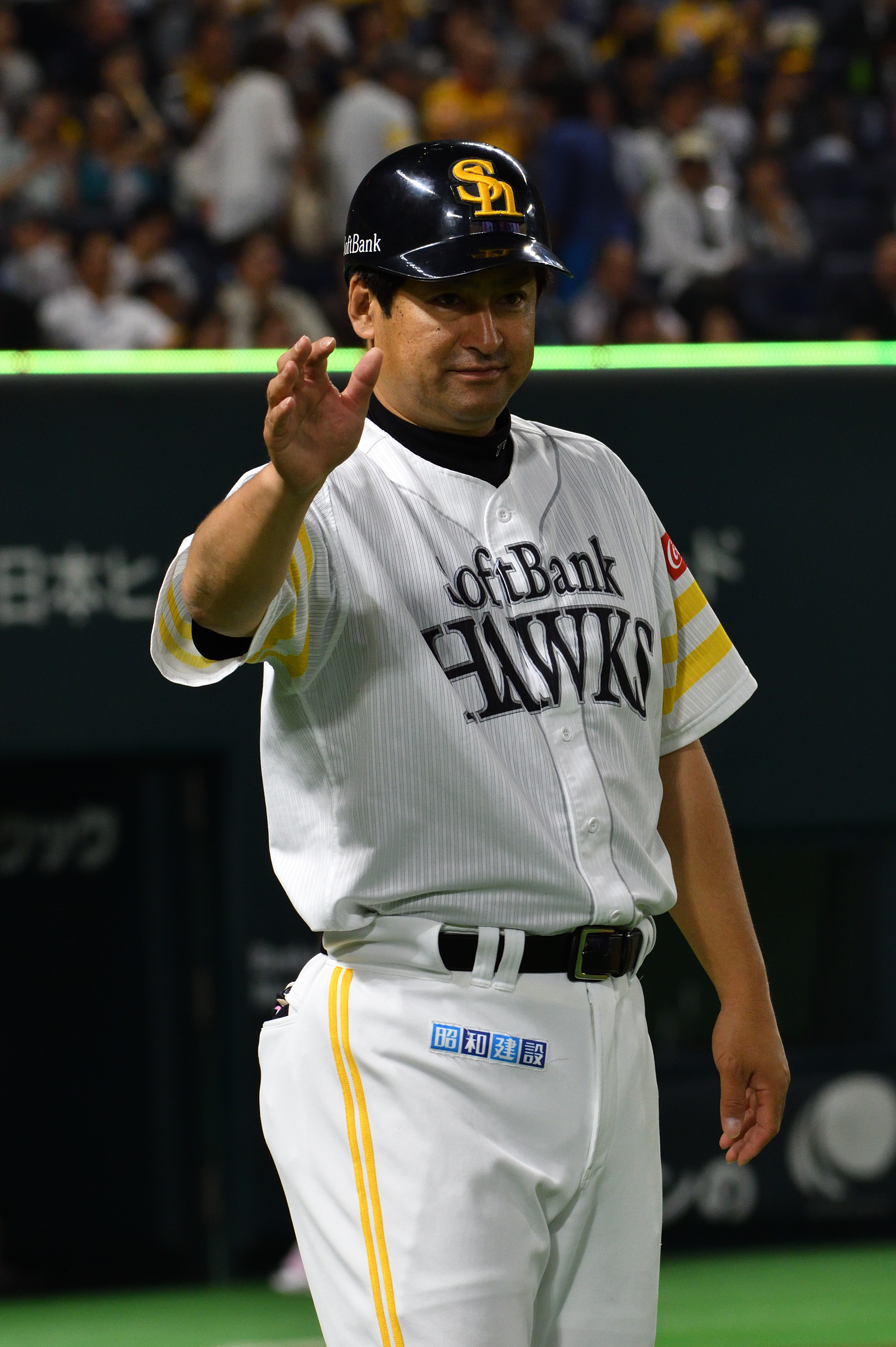
- Omichi with the Fukuoka SoftBank Hawks.

Fukuoka SoftBank Hawks – No. 75
- Infielder / Coach
- Born: October 28, 1969 (age 56); Daiō, Shima District, Mie, Japan
- Batted: Right Threw: Right

NPB debut
- October 14, 1989, for the Fukuoka Daiei Hawks

Last NPB appearance
- September 19, 2010, for the Yomiuri Giants

NPB statistics
- Batting average: .284
- Hits: 906
- Home runs: 60
- Runs batted in: 415

Teams
- As player: Nankai Hawks/Fukuoka Daiei Hawks/Fukuoka SoftBank Hawks (1988–2006); Yomiuri Giants (2007–2010); As coach: Yomiuri Giants (2012); Fukuoka SoftBank Hawks (2013–present)

Career highlights and awards
- As player: 3× Japan Series champion (1999, 2003, 2009); As coach: Japan Series champion (2025)
- Last updated on: 26 June 2020

Noriyoshi Omichi (大道 典良, Ōmichi Noriyoshi; born October 28, 1969) is a Japanese former professional baseball infielder, and current third squad hitting coach for the Fukuoka SoftBank Hawks of Nippon Professional Baseball (NPB).

He was called the last Nankai Warrior during his active player era because he was drafted in his final year as a member of the Nankai Hawks.

He played in NPB for the Hawks and Yomiuri Giants.

== Professional career ==
=== Active player era ===
==== Nankai Hawks / Fukuoka Daiei / SoftBank Hawks ====
On November 18, 1987, Omichi was drafted fifth round pick by the Nankai Hawks in the 1987 Nippon Professional Baseball draft.

In order to continue his professional baseball career for a long time, Omichi developed a unique batting form in which he gripping the bat extremely short despite his height of 185 cm, and grew as a skilled hitter.

In 1996 season, he became a regular member, appearing in 90 games and recorded with a batting average of .325, 10 home runs and a 51 RBI.

In the latter half of his career, he was called a left-handed pitcher killer and a pinch-hitter's ace, and he mainly played as a pinch-hitter against left-handed pitchers. Also, Omichi totaled 15 home runs in pinch hitter at bats.

He appeared in 1,212 games over an 18-season career with the Hawks before being traded to the Yomiuri Giants in the off-season of 2006.

==== Yomiuri Giants ====
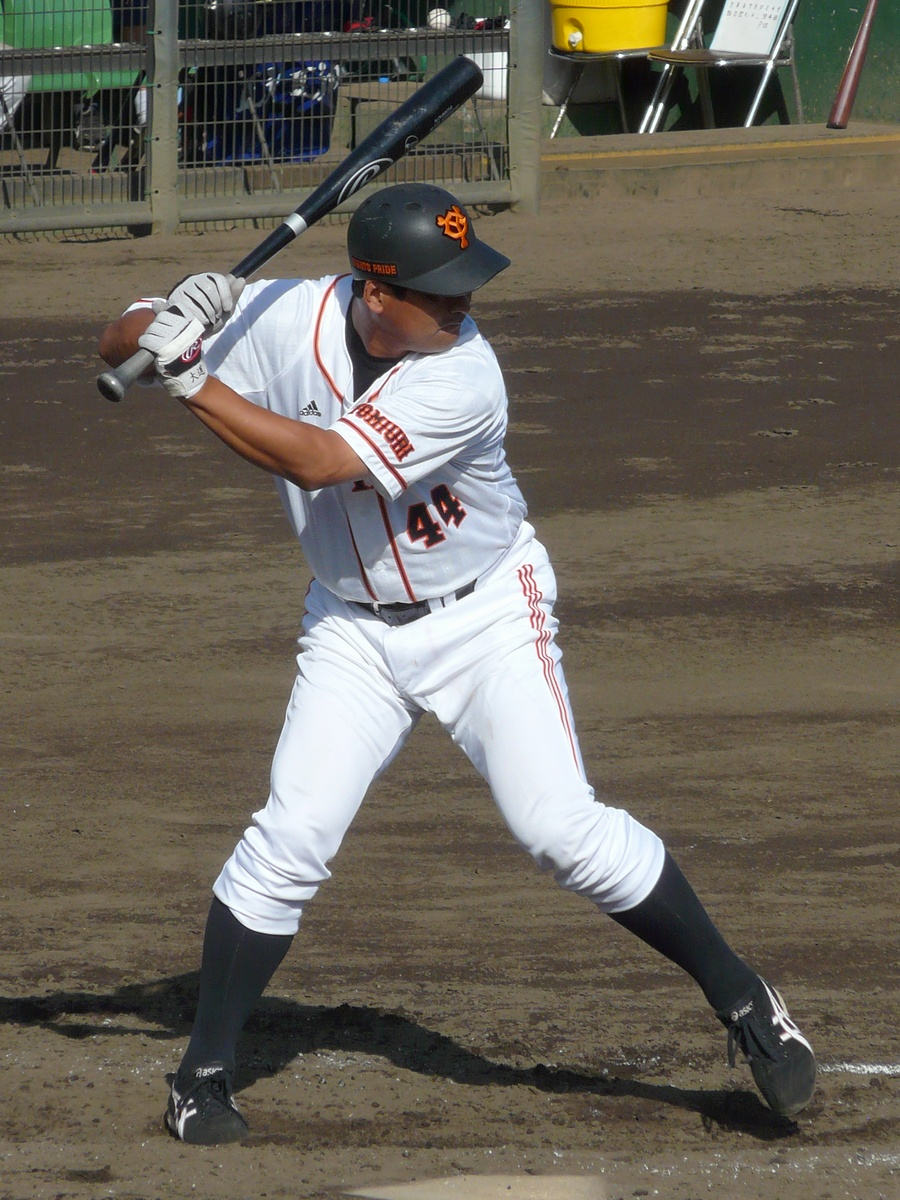
Omichi with the Yomiuri Giants.

Omichi also served as a pinch hitter for the Giants, appearing in 60 games during the 2008 season, batting .274 with 16 RBIs and two home runs.

He played four seasons with the Giants, but announced his retirement on October 29, 2010.

Omichi played 22 seasons, appearing in 1,356 games and a batting average of .284, 60 home runs, 906 hits, a RBI of 415, 9 stolen bases, and 80 sacrifice bunts.

=== After retirement ===
After receiving coaching training with the New York Yankees in 1A during the 2011 season, Omichi was appointed as the Yomiuri Giants' development coach during the 2012 season.

On October 29, 2012, Omichi was appointed as the second squad hitting coach of the Fukuoka SoftBank Hawks.

He serve as the third squad hitting coach since the 2022 season.
