= Tomoya Inzen =

Japanese baseball player (born 1984)

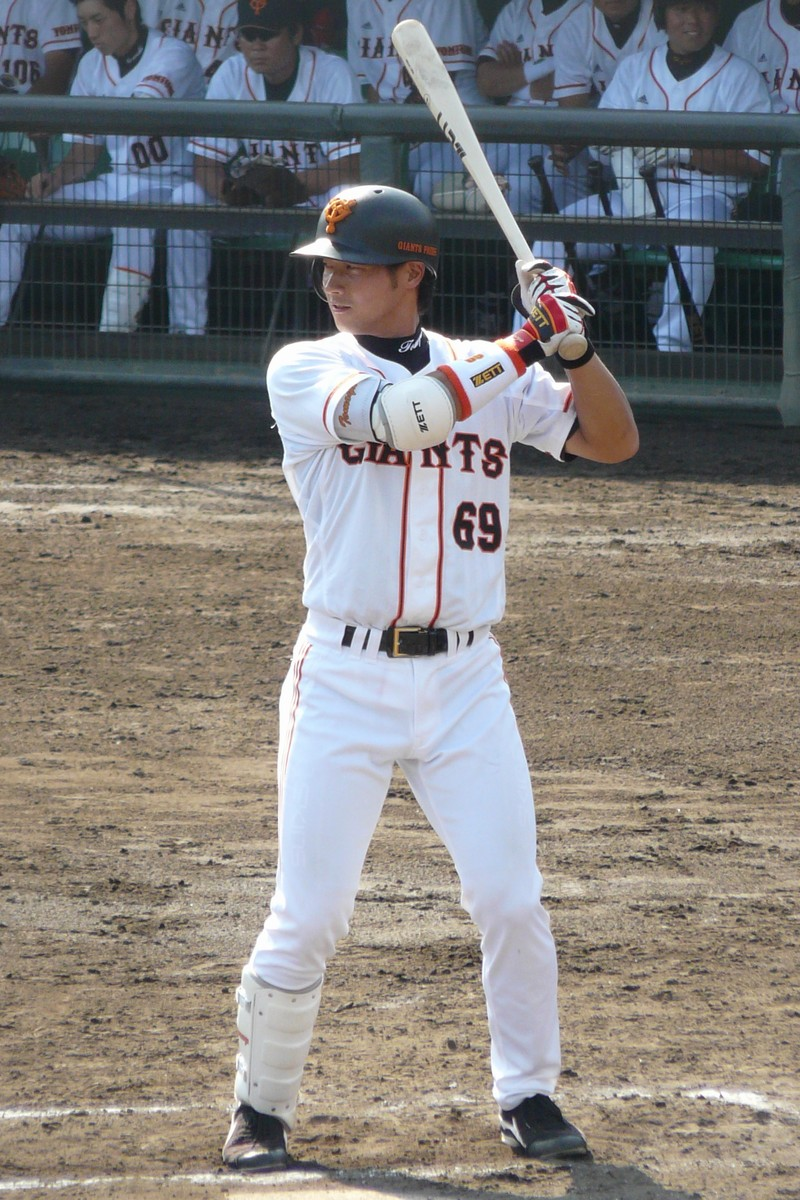
- Outfielder
- Born: June 5, 1984 (age 42); Hiroshima, Japan
- Bats: Left Throws: Left

NPB debut
- March 30, 2008, for the Yomiuri Giants

NPB statistics (through 2008 season)
- Batting average: .290
- Hits: 18
- RBIs: 4
- Stats at Baseball Reference

Teams
- Yomiuri Giants (2008 – 2015)
- Last updated on: 8 December 2008

Tomoya Inzen (隠善 智也, Inzen Tomoya; born June 5, 1984 in Hiroshima, Japan) is a Japanese Nippon Professional Baseball player for the Yomiuri Giants in Japan's Central League.
