= Ryuichi Kajimae =

Japanese baseball player (born 1985)

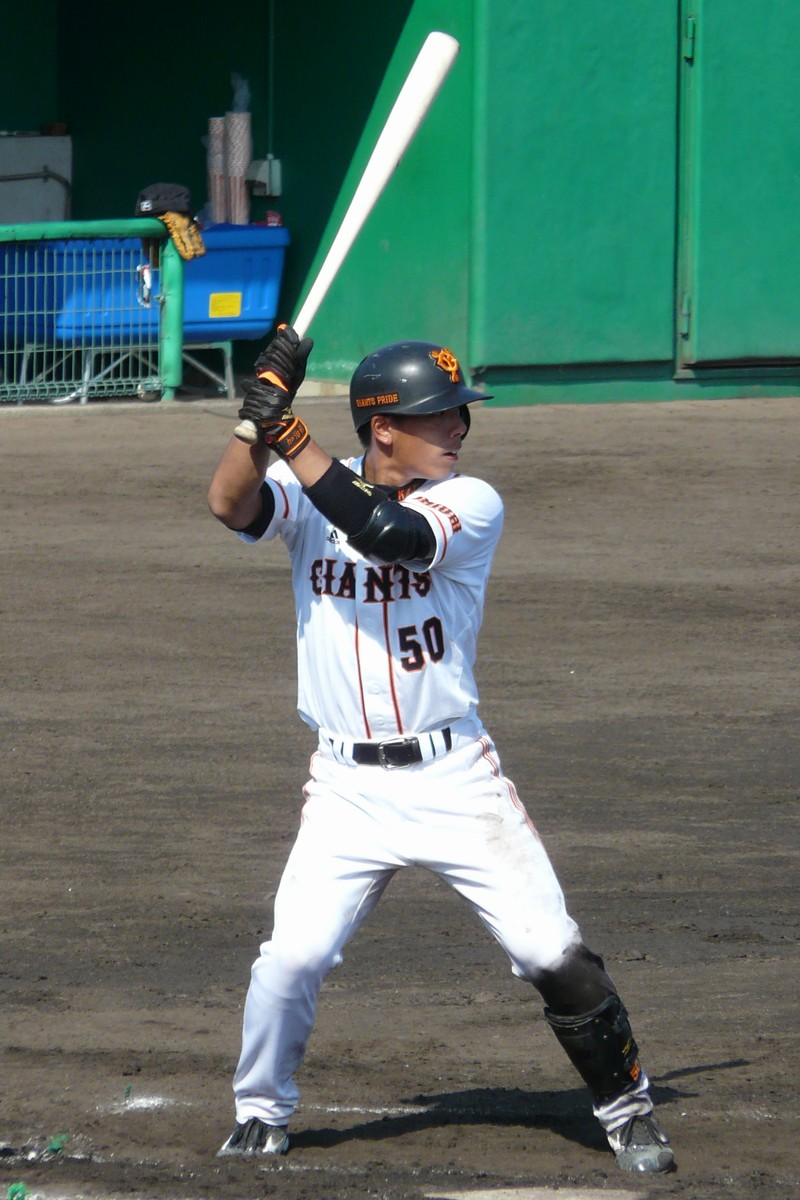
- Outfielder
- Born: April 6, 1985 (age 41); Nara, Japan
- Bats: Right Throws: Right

NPB debut
- June 1, 2008, for the Yomiuri Giants

NPB statistics (through 2008 season)
- Batting average: .229
- Hits: 8
- RBIs: 2
- Stats at Baseball Reference

Teams
- Yomiuri Giants (2008–2014)
- Last updated on: 8 December 2008

Ryuichi Kajimae (加治前 竜一, Kajimae Ryuichi; born April 6, 1985 in Nara, Japan) is a Japanese Nippon Professional Baseball player. Since becoming a professional in 2008, he has played with the Yomiuri Giants in Japan's Central League.
