= Daisuke Nakai =

Japanese baseball player (born 1989)

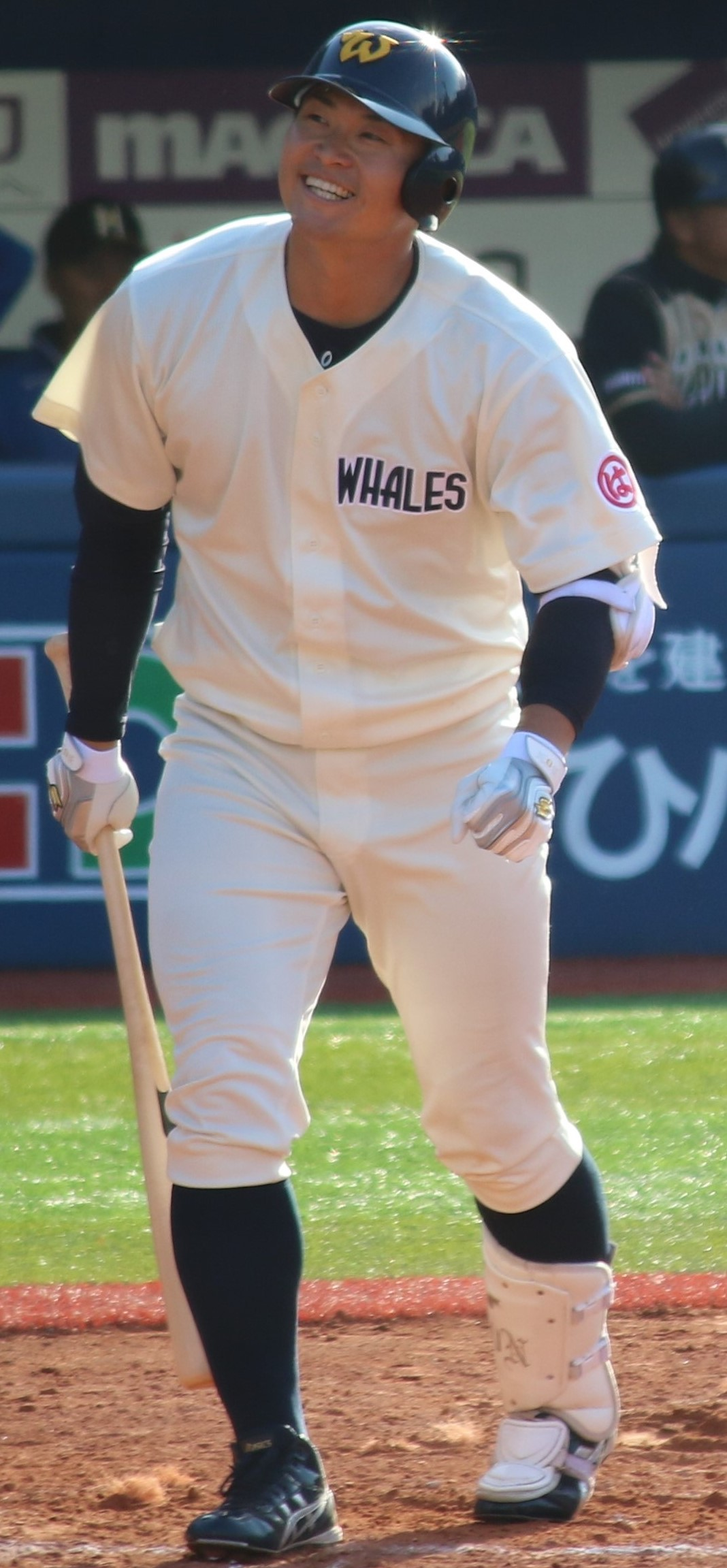
- Nakai with the Yokohama DeNA Baystars.

Yokohama DeNA BayStars – No. 89
- Infielder / Coach
- Born: November 27, 1989 (age 36)
- Batted: Right Threw: Right

NPB debut
- May 12, 2009, for the Yomiuri Giants

Last NPB appearance
- October 20, 2021, for the Yokohama DeNA BayStars

NPB statistics
- Batting average: .243
- Home runs: 16
- RBI: 65
- Stats at Baseball Reference

Teams
- As player: Yomiuri Giants (2009–2018); Yokohama DeNA BayStars (2019–2021); As coach: Yokohama DeNA BayStars (2024–present)

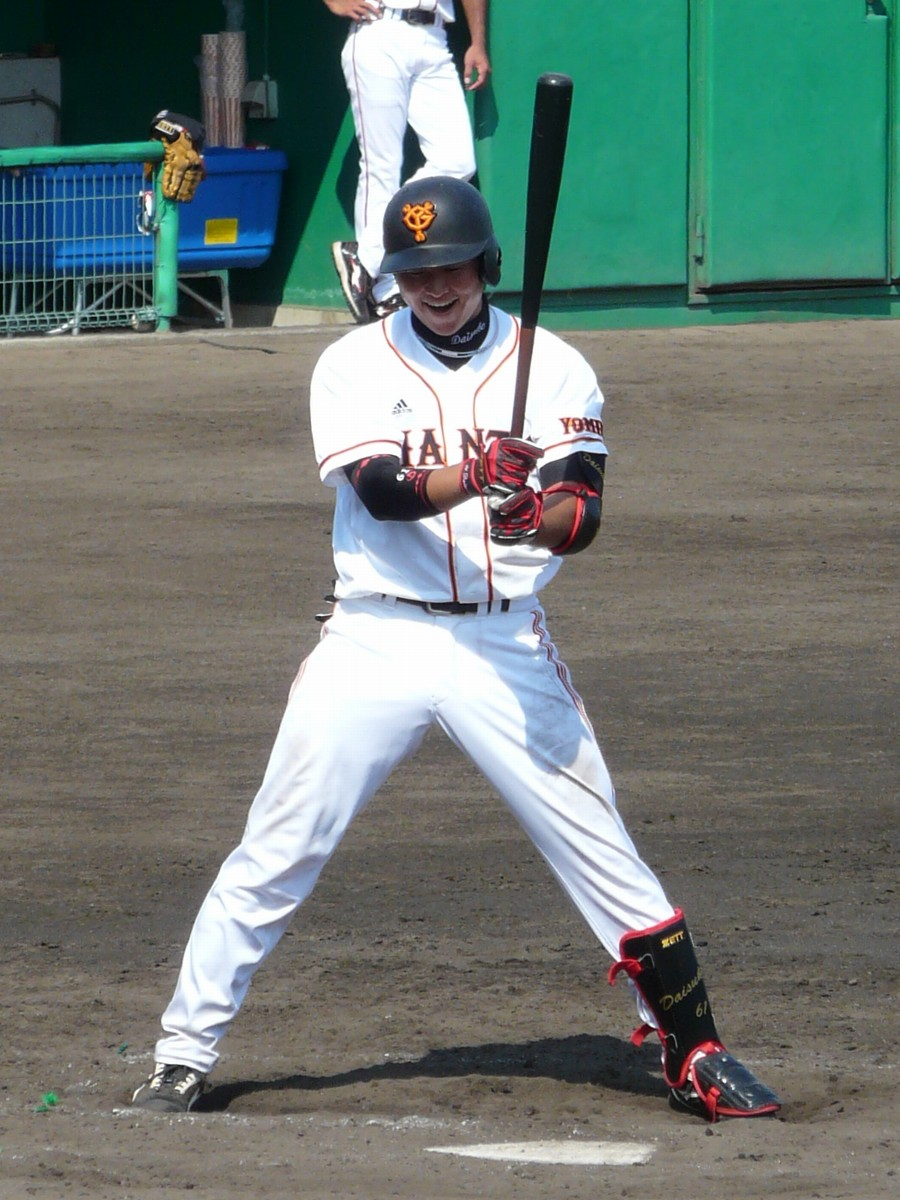
Nakai with the Yomiuri Giants

Daisuke Nakai (中井 大介, born November 27, 1989) is a Japanese professional baseball infielder for the Yokohama DeNA BayStars in Japan's Nippon Professional Baseball.
