= Kenji Yano =

Japanese baseball player and coach

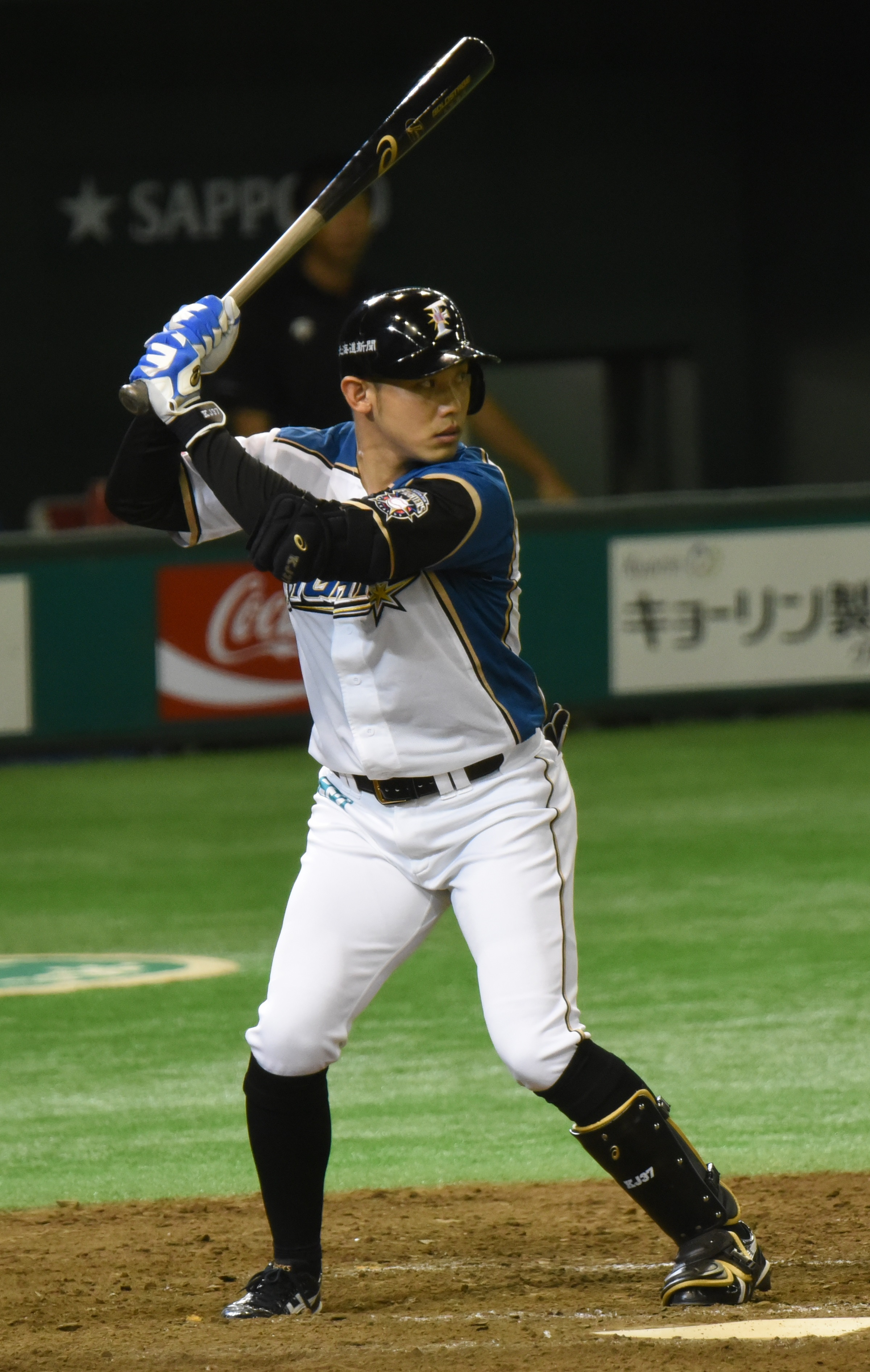
- Yano with the Hokkaido Nippon-Ham Fighters

Yomiuri Giants – No. 80
- Outfielder / Coach
- Born: September 21, 1980 (age 45); Mitaka, Tokyo, Japan
- Batted: Right Threw: Right

NPB debut
- August 19, 2003, for the Yomiuri Giants

Last NPB appearance
- October 10, 2018, for the Hokkaido Nippon-Ham Fighters

NPB statistics (through 2018)
- Batting average: .262
- Home runs: 29
- RBI: 153
- Stats at Baseball Reference

Teams
- As player: Yomiuri Giants (2003–2015); Hokkaido Nippon-Ham Fighters (2015–2018); As coach: Hokkaido Nippon-Ham Fighters (2020–2022); Yomiuri Giants (2024-present)

Kenji Yano (矢野 謙次, born September 21, 1980) is a Japanese former professional baseball outfielder. He played for the Yomiuri Giants and the Hokkaido Nippon-Ham Fighters.

After his retirement in 2018, Yano was sent to the Texas Rangers for a year to train to be a coach. For the 2020 season, Yano will return to Japan as the Fighters' outfield coach and assistant hitting coach.
