= Takuya Fukata =

Japanese baseball player (born 1983)

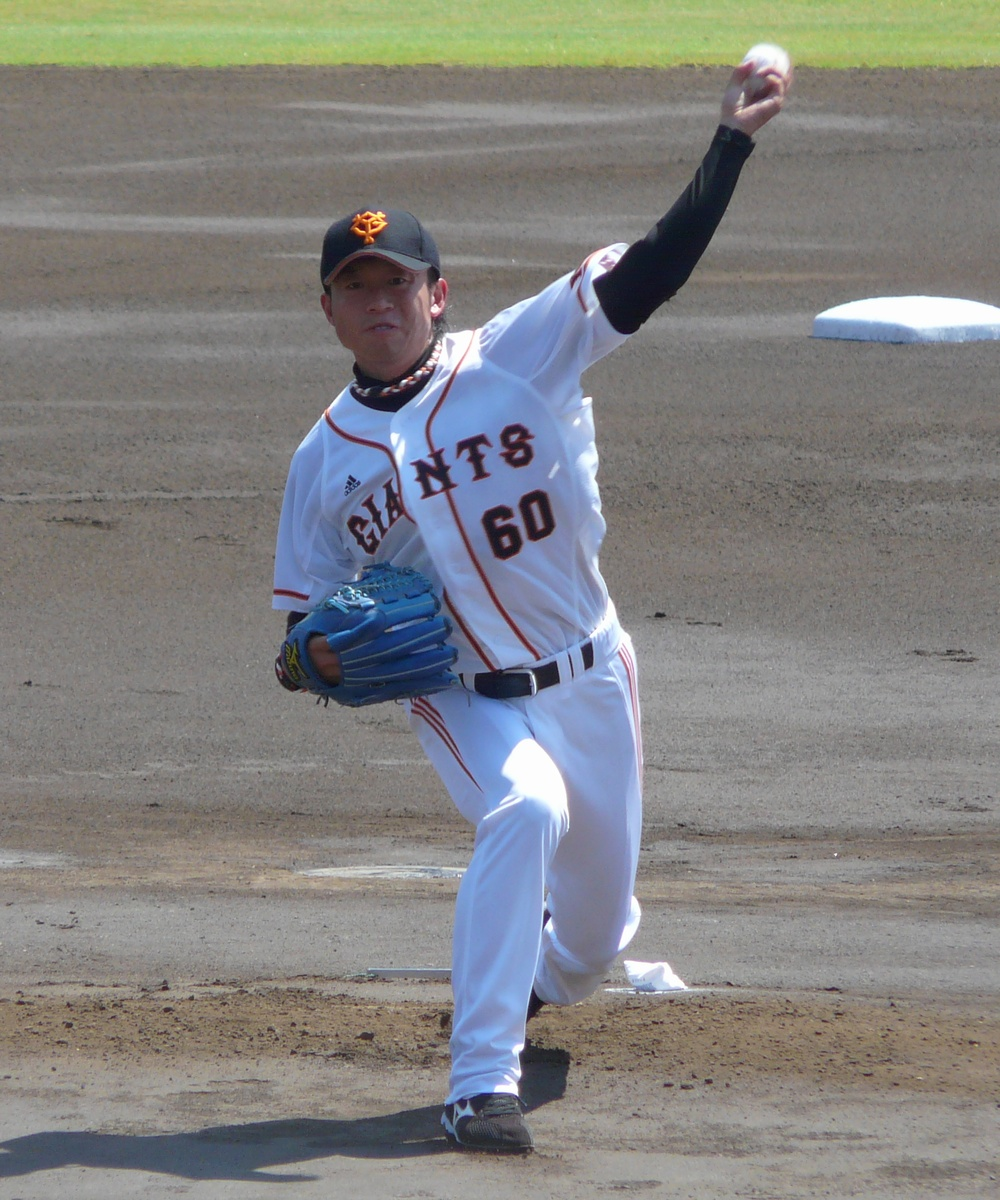
- Pitcher
- Born: April 23, 1983 (age 42); Suruga-ku, Shizuoka, Japan
- Bats: Left Throws: Left

Teams
- Yomiuri Giants (2007, 2009)

Takuya Fukata (深田 拓也, Fukata Takuya; born April 23, 1983 in Suruga-ku, Shizuoka, Japan) is a former Japanese Nippon Professional Baseball pitcher. He played for the Yomiuri Giants in 2007 and 2009.
