= Shigeyuki Furuki =

Japanese baseball player (born 1976)

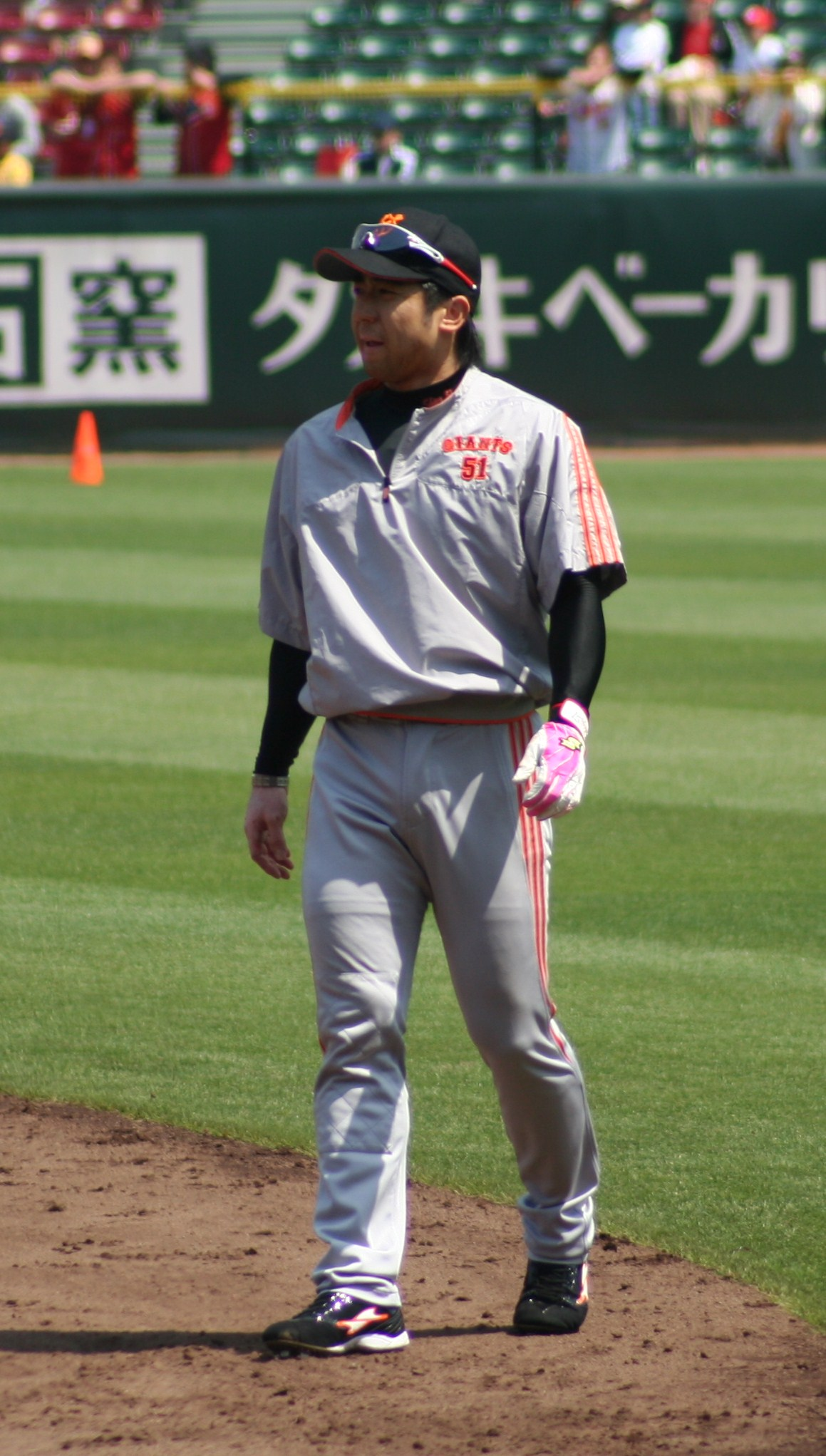
- Infielder / Coach
- Born: January 12, 1976 (age 50); Kashiwa, Chiba, Japan
- Bats: Left Throws: Right

NPB debut
- April 7, 1999, for the Nippon Ham Fighters

NPB statistics (through 2008 season)
- Batting average: .215
- Hits: 139
- RBIs: 43
- Stats at Baseball Reference

Teams
- As player: Nippon-Ham Fighters/Hokkaido Nippon-Ham Fighters (1998–2005); Yomiuri Giants (2006–2013); As coach: Yomiuri Giants (2019–2025)

Career highlights and awards
- 2009 Japan Series champion
- Last updated on: 27 December 2018

Shigeyuki Furuki (古城 茂幸, Furuki Shigeyuki; born January 12, 1976 in Kashiwa, Chiba, Japan) is a Japanese Nippon Professional Baseball player for the Yomiuri Giants in Japan's Central League. Before playing for the Giants he was a member of the Hokkaido Nippon-Ham Fighters.

When he comes to bat, his fans often sing a cheer that goes to the tune of a song from the Super Nintendo Entertainment System game EarthBound.
