= Daijiro Tanaka =

Japanese baseball player (born 1988)

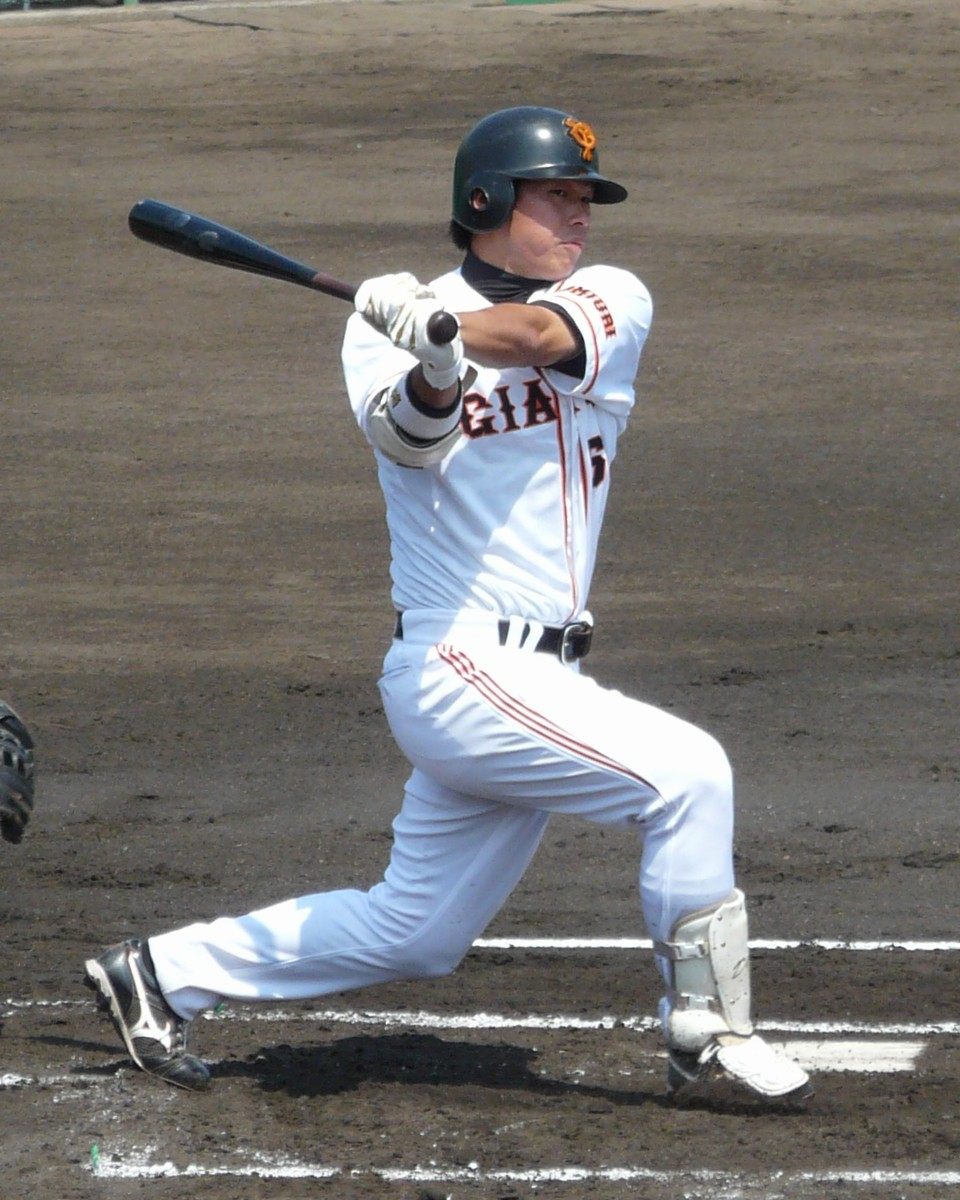
- First baseman
- Born: April 29, 1988 (age 37)
- Bats: Left Throws: Left

NPB debut
- 2008, for the Yomiuri Giants

NPB statistics (through 2011)
- Batting average: .135
- Home runs: 0
- RBI: 1

Teams
- Yomiuri Giants (2008–2009, 2011)

Daijiro Tanaka (田中 大二郎, Tanaka Daijirō; born April 29, 1988) is a Japanese former professional baseball first baseman who played for the Yomiuri Giants in Japan's Nippon Professional Baseball. He played with the Giants in 2008, 2009 and 2011.
