= Daisuke Ochi =

Japanese baseball player (born 1983)

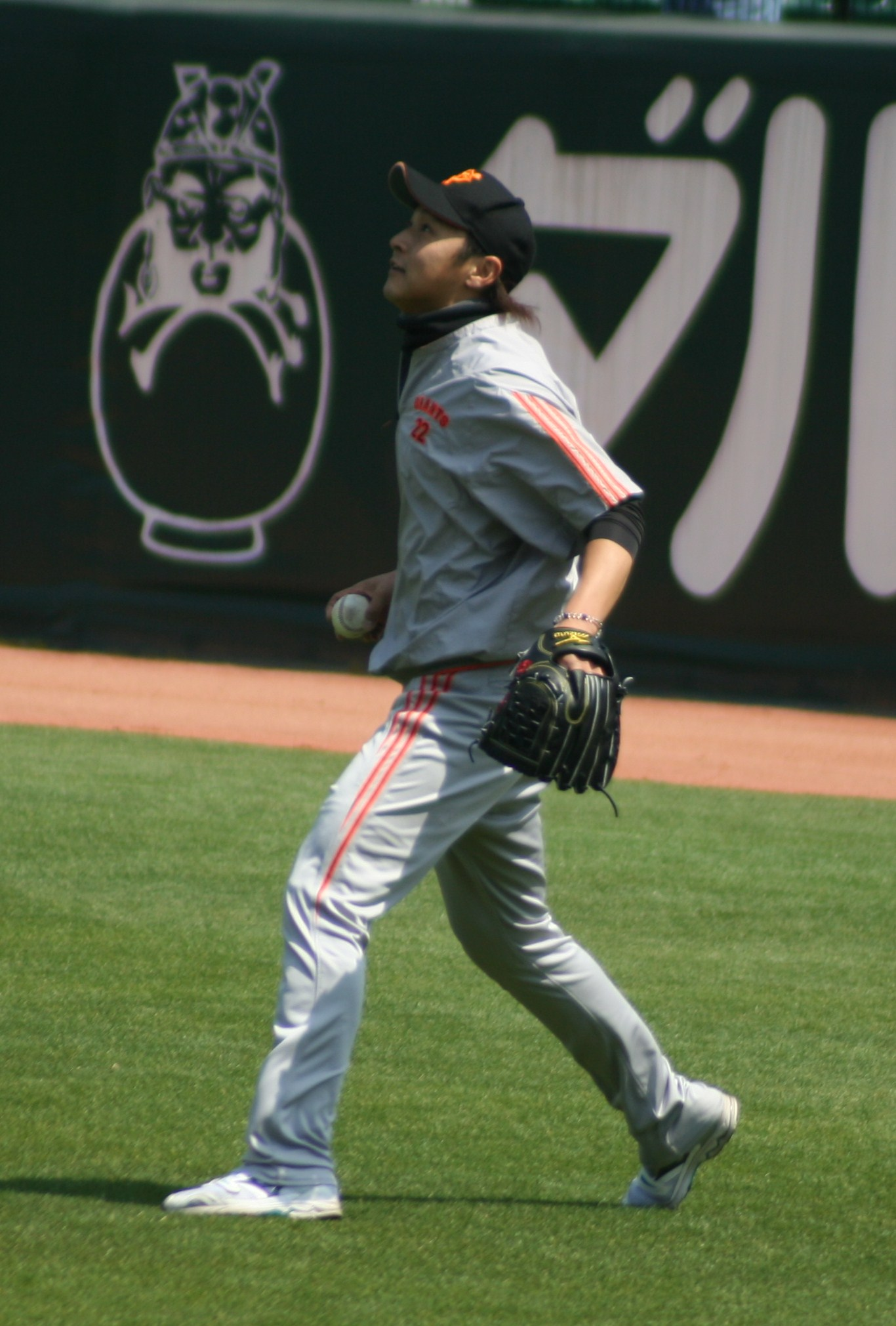
- Pitcher
- Born: June 30, 1983 (age 43); Ehime, Japan
- Batted: Right Threw: Right

NPB debut
- March 28, 2008, for the Yomiuri Giants

Last NPB appearance
- April 18, 2012, for the Yomiuri Giants

NPB statistics
- Win–loss record: 18–13
- Earned run average: 3.05
- Strikeouts: 263

Teams
- Yomiuri Giants (2006–2014)

Career highlights and awards
- Japan Series champion (2009)
- Last updated on: 10 February 2016

Daisuke Ochi (越智 大祐, Ochi Daisuke; born June 30, 1983) is a Japanese former professional baseball pitcher. He played in Nippon Professional Baseball (NPB) for the Yomiuri Giants from 2006 to 2014.

== Career ==
As a rookie in 2008, Ochi was a key member of a young Giants bullpen that came within three outs of a Japan Series title. Ochi was the losing pitcher in Game 7 of that series against the Saitama Seibu Lions, after he hit Lions second baseman Yasuyuki Kataoka. Kataoka subsequently stole second and third, then was driven home to tie the game. Ochi put another man on and was ultimately charged with what proved to be the series-winning run. With the Yomiuri Giants, he played in a March 2008 exhibition game in Tokyo against the Boston Red Sox.
