= Shun Tono =

Japanese baseball player

Shun Tono 東野 峻
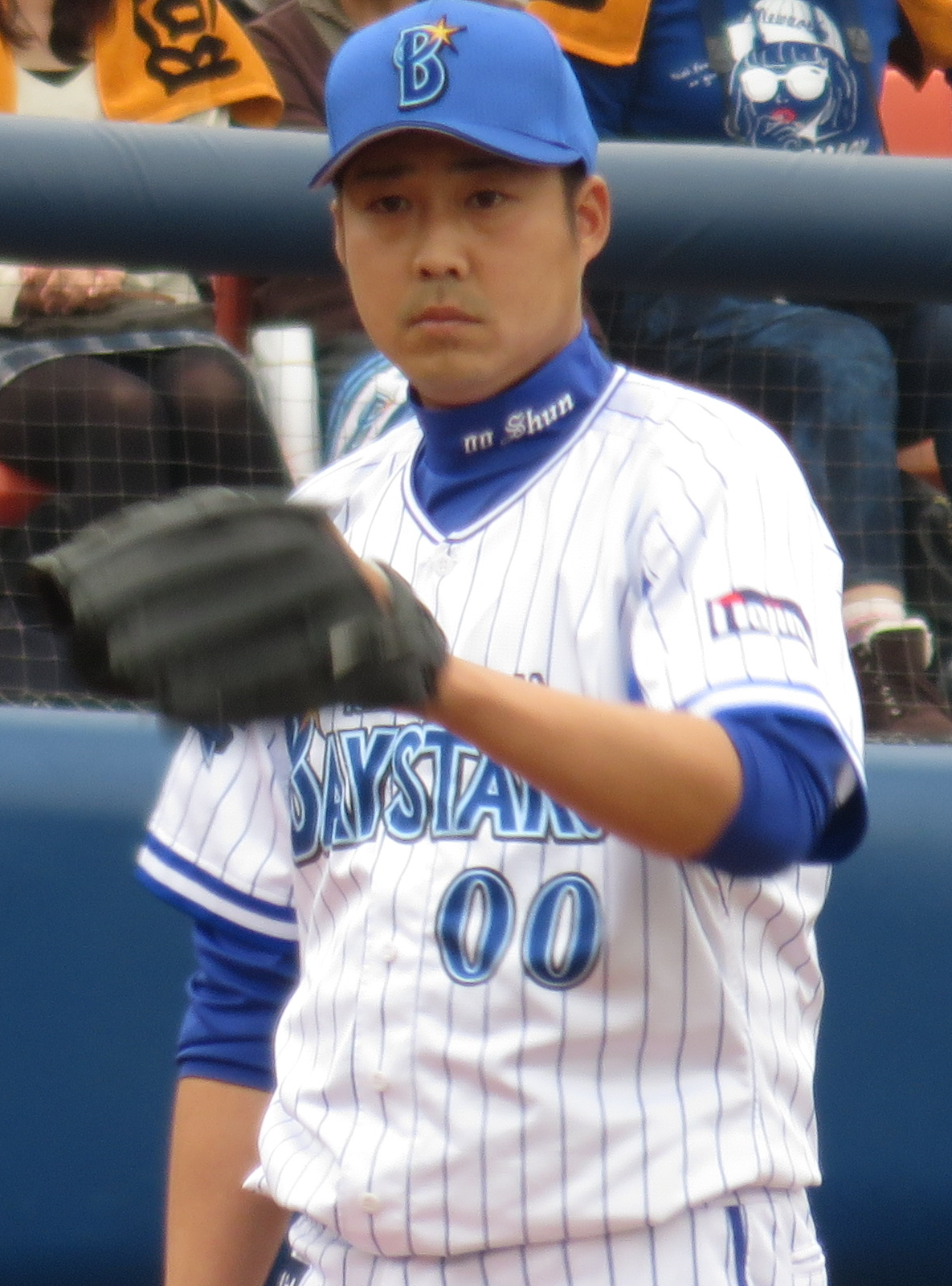
- Tono with the Yokohama DeNA BayStars

Yokohama DeNA BayStars – No. 87
- Pitcher / Coach
- Born: July 11, 1986 (age 39); Ibaraki, Japan
- Batted: Right Threw: Right

NPB debut
- September 13, 2007, for the Yomiuri Giants

Last NPB appearance
- May 31, 2015, for the Yokohama DeNA BayStars

NPB statistics (through 2015)
- Win–loss record: 32–30
- Earned run average: 3.43
- Strikeouts: 458
- Stats at Baseball Reference

Teams
- As player: Yomiuri Giants (2007–2012); Orix Buffaloes (2013–2014); Yokohama DeNA BayStars (2015); As coach: Yokohama DeNA BayStars (2024-present)

Career highlights and awards
- 2009 Japan Series champion
- Last updated on: February 18, 2024

Shun Tono (東野 峻, Tōno Shun; born July 11, 1986) is a Japanese Nippon Professional Baseball player. He is currently with the Yokohama DeNA BayStars in Japan's Pacific League. He made his Giants debut in 2007 against the Tokyo Yakult Swallows, pitching 2/3 of an inning and giving up a hit and a walk in that span.

He saw expanded action in 2008 as a mid-season call-up, and he was part of a young bullpen that led the Giants to a Japan Series berth against the eventual champion Saitama Seibu Lions. In 28 games, he pitched in relief in 26 of them and made two starts, one of them being his first career complete game against the Hiroshima Toyo Carp on September 24. He made four appearances in the '08 playoffs, all without giving up a run.

His first full season in 2009 started off very well, as Tono posted quality starts in four of his first five starts, en route to 14 for the year, but his smoking habit caught up with him late in the season. Run support was a problem for him though, as he had 10 no-decisions to go with his 8–8 record and a respectable 3.17 ERA. His season was marred by a bit of controversy, as Tono was pulled from his start on September 16 by manager Tatsunori Hara. A frustrated Hara said after the game, "As an athlete, not being able to quit smoking represents a larger weakness. He needs to get stronger." This was the third in a string of three straight poor starts for the young righty.

Ultimately, Tono was a part of the 2009 Japan Series Champion Giants, who defeated the Hokkaido Nippon-Ham Fighters in six games to with their 21st title. He pitched in three games in the postseason, giving up 1 run in 8 and 1/3 innings. He also started the deciding 6th game in the series, but had to leave with two down in the very first inning after being struck on the hand on a line drive by Nippon Ham Fighters first baseman Shinji Takahashi.

== Pitching Style ==
Tono is one of many starters in Japan who pitches exclusively from the stretch position, modifying his delivery when there are runners on base. He does not have overpowering pitches, as his four-seam fastball tops out only at 144 km/h (89 MPH). However, Tono does compensate with good control on his fastball and also has an array of other pitches, among them a sharp curveball, a late-breaking slider, and a forkball, leading to a lot of strikeouts. He is prone to bad spells resulting from errors or consecutive hits, and is also prone to giving up home runs. However, he is also adept at pitching out of jams and gets clutch strikeouts when needed.
