= Yoshinobu Takahashi =

Japanese baseball manager and former player

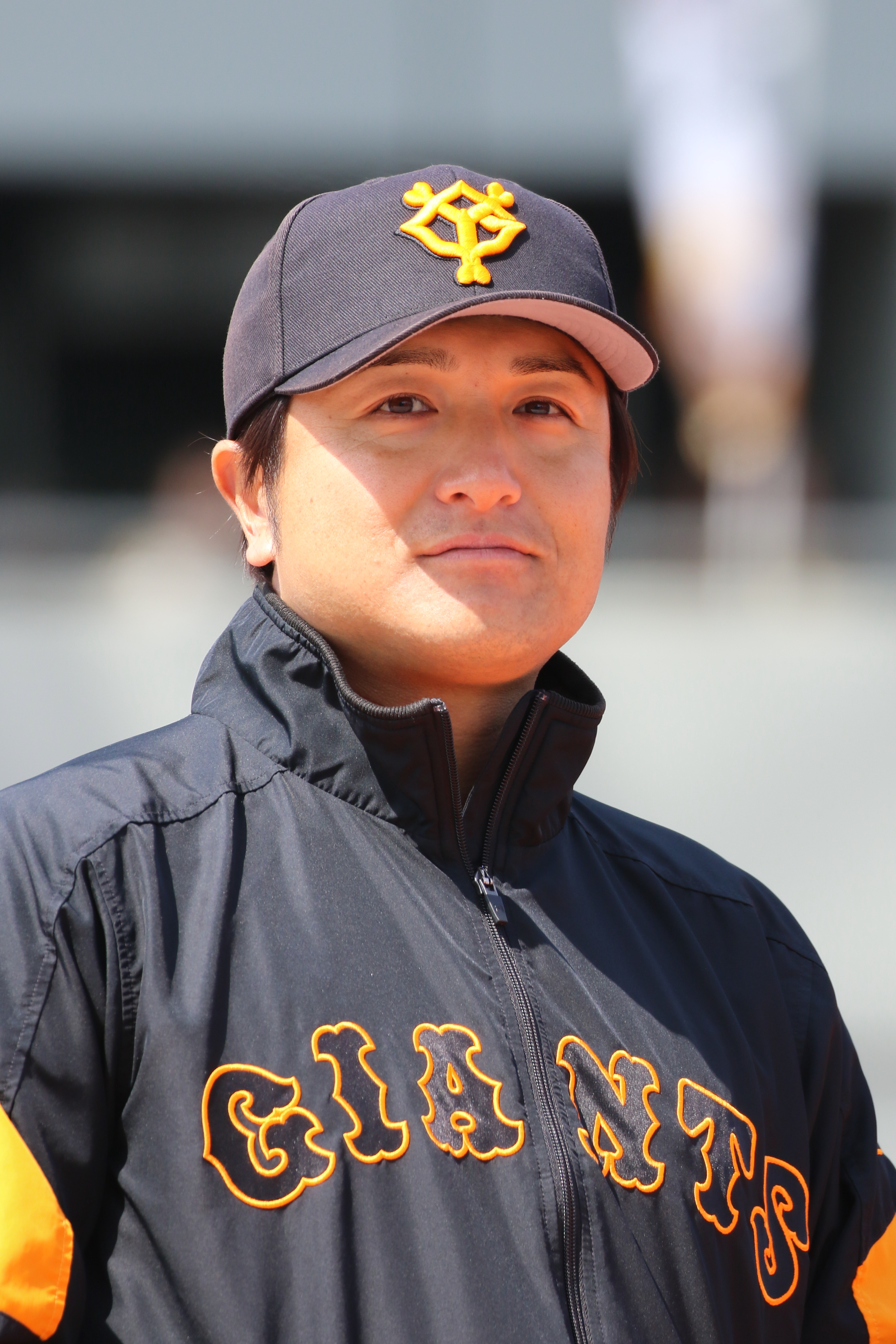
- Takahashi with the Yomiuri Giants
- Outfielder/Manager
- Born: April 3, 1975 (age 51); Chiba, Chiba, Japan
- Bats: Left Throws: Right

NPB debut
- April 3, 1998, for the Yomiuri Giants

Career statistics
- Batting average: .291
- Home runs: 321
- Runs batted in: 986
- Stats at Baseball Reference

Teams
- As player: Yomiuri Giants (1998–2015); As manager: Yomiuri Giants (2016–2018)

Career highlights and awards
- 4x Japan Series champion (2000, 2002, 2009, 2012); 2x Best Nine Award (1999, 2007)

Olympic medal record

Men's baseball
Bronze medal – third place	Athens 2004	Team competition

Yoshinobu Takahashi (高橋 由伸, born April 3, 1975) is a Japanese former professional baseball player and manager. He spent his entire playing career with the Yomiuri Giants and served as the team's manager for three seasons. He graduated from Keio University.

A superb contact hitter, he is also known for his exemplary defensive play. He won the Golden Glove award for six consecutive years between 1998 and 2003. Despite his brilliant records, Takahashi has injured himself numerous times over the years going after fly balls. The injuries primarily resulted from his play style, in which he does not give up on fly balls until they hit the ground. His first injury was on September 14, 1999, at a Chunichi Dragons game, where he jumped diagonally against the outfield fence, causing a fractured shoulder bone.

He was selected to be part of the Japanese Olympic baseball team for the 2004 Summer Olympics and contributed to the team's bronze medal.

Takahashi served as the Giants' manager from 2016 to 2018. After his departure, he stayed on with the Giants as a special adviser.
