= Yuya Kubo (baseball) =

Japanese baseball player (born 1980)

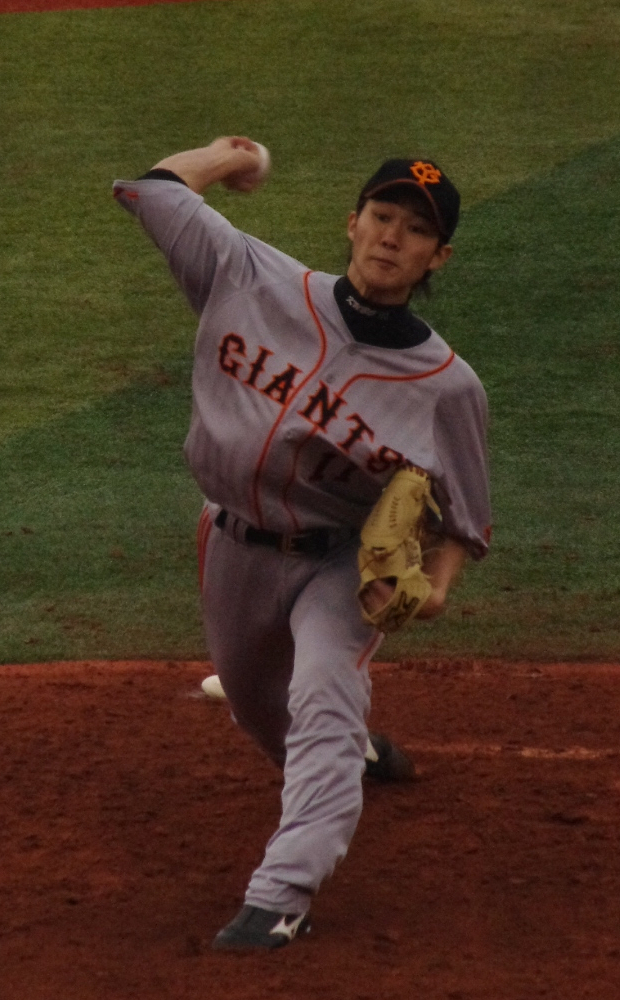
- Kubo with the Yomiuri Giants

Tohoku Rakuten Golden Eagles – No. 91
- Pitcher / Coach
- Born: May 23, 1980 (age 46); Fukuoka, Japan
- Batted: Right Threw: Right

NPB debut
- March 28, 2003, for the Yomiuri Giants

Last NPB appearance
- August 14, 2020, for the Tohoku Rakuten Golden Eagles

NPB statistics
- Win–loss: 54-37
- ERA: 3.45
- Strikeouts: 676
- Stats at Baseball Reference

Teams
- As player: Yomiuri Giants (2003–2015); Yokohama DeNA BayStars (2016); Tohoku Rakuten Golden Eagles (2017–2020)

Career highlights and awards
- 1× Japan Series champion (2009)

Yuya Kubo (久保 裕也, Kubo Yûya; born May 23, 1980 in Fukuoka, Japan) is a Japanese former professional baseball pitcher who is currently the pitching coach for the Tohoku Rakuten Golden Eagles of Nippon Professional Baseball (NPB). He played in NPB for the Yomiuri Giants, Yokohama DeNA BayStars, and Golden Eagles.

== Career ==
Kubo selected Yomiuri Giants in the 2002 NPB draft.

On March 28, 2003, Kubo made his NPB debut.

On November 7, 2020, Kubo announced his retirement, and held press conference.
