= Shinnosuke Abe =

Japanese baseball player

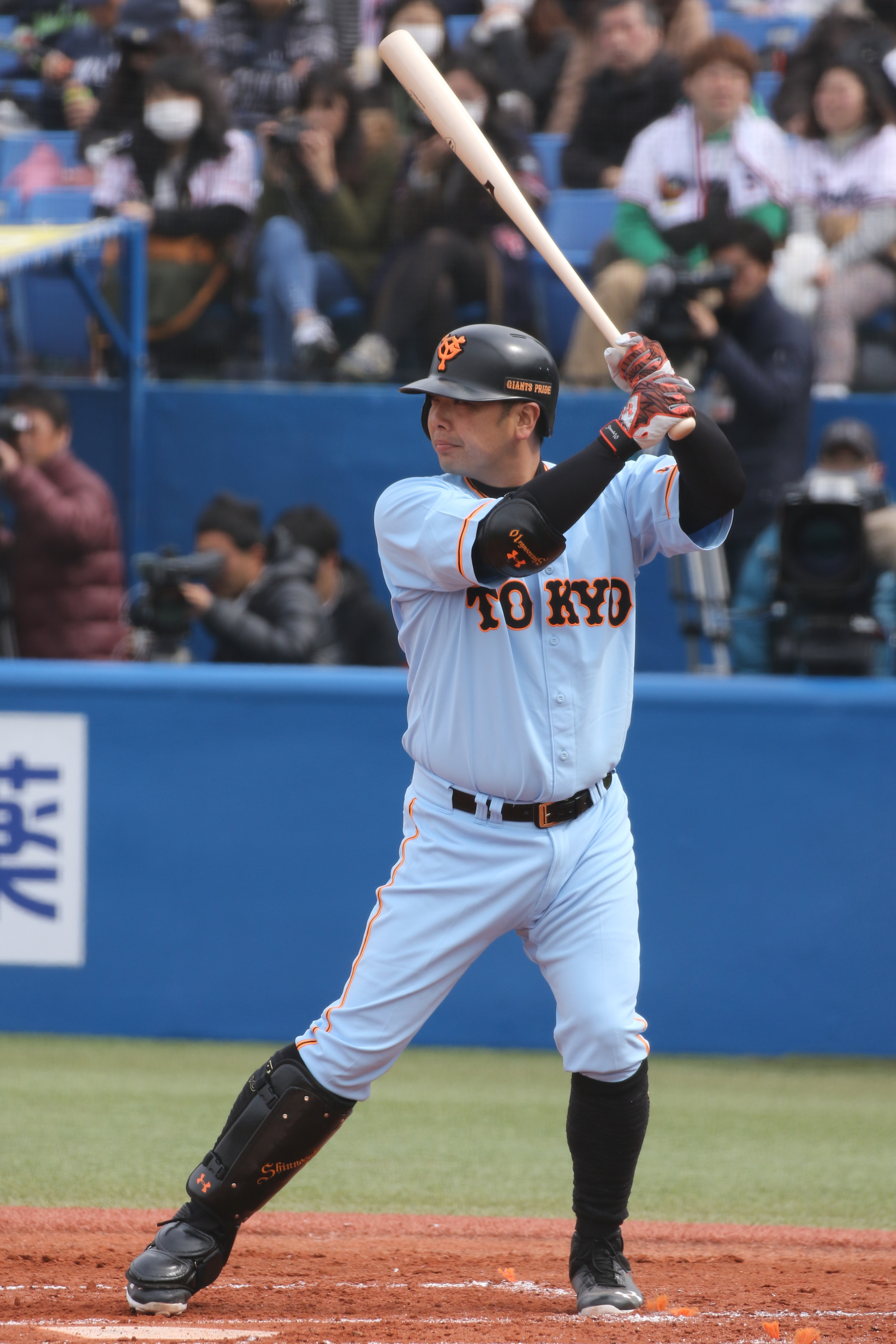
- Abe with the Yomiuri Giants
- Catcher / Coach / Manager
- Born: March 20, 1979 (age 47); Urayasu, Chiba, Japan
- Batted: Left Threw: Right

debut
- March 30, 2001, for the Yomiuri Giants

Last appearance
- October 23, 2019, for the Yomiuri Giants

Career statistics
- Batting average: .284
- Home runs: 406
- Runs batted in: 1,285
- Hits: 2,132
- Stats at Baseball Reference

Teams
- As player: Yomiuri Giants (2001–2019); As coach: Yomiuri Giants (2020–2023); As manager: Yomiuri Giants (2024–2026)

Career highlights and awards
- Central League MVP (2012); Japan Series Most Valuable Player Award (2009); 3× Japan Series champion (2002, 2009, 2012); NPB Double Crown (2012); 9× Best Nine Award (2002, 2007-2014); 4× Central League Golden Glove Award (2002, 2008, 2013, 2014); Japan Professional Sports Grand Prize (2012)
Medals
Representing Japan
Men's baseball
World Baseball Classic
Gold medal – first place	2009 Los Angeles	Team
Asian Baseball Championship
Silver medal – second place	1999 Seoul	Team
Gold medal – first place	2007 Taichung	Team
Intercontinental Cup
Gold medal – first place	1997 Barcelona	Team

Shinnosuke Abe (阿部 慎之助, Abe Shinnosuke; born March 20, 1979) is a Japanese former professional baseball player and manager. He spent his entire 19-year career with Nippon Professional Baseball's Yomiuri Giants, serving as the team's captain from 2007 to 2014. He has twice been named the MVP of the Nippon Professional Baseball All-Star Series, in 2007 (Game 1) and 2010 (Game 1). Currently, he serves as the manager for the Giants.

== Career ==
=== As a player ===
In the 2009 Japan Series, won by Abe's Giants 4 games to 2 over the Hokkaido Nippon-Ham Fighters, he was named the Most Valuable Player.

In 2012, after hitting .340 with 27 home runs and 104 RBIs, Abe was named the Central League Most Valuable Player. In addition, Abe was the co-recipient (along with teammate Tatsunori Hara) of the 2012 Matsutaro Shoriki Award.

He was the captain of Japanese national team in 2013 WBC, and hit 2 home runs in the same inning against the Netherlands, becoming the first and only player to achieve such a feat in the history of the WBC.

With 406 career home runs, Abe ranks 18th on the NPB career list.

On September 24, 2019, Abe announced he would retire after the 2019 season, his 19th in NPB.

=== As a coach ===
Abe was named the manager of the Giants' second squad for the 2020 season.

On October 4, 2023, Abe was named the Tatsunori Hara's successor as manager for the main club, after Hara announced his intention to step down.

=== As a manager ===
Abe signed a three-year contract as manager and wore uniform number 83, the same number as his predecessor, Tatsunori Hara. In the 2024 season, the team won the Central League pennant, marking the Yomiuri Giants' first league title under a first-year manager since 2002. However, they were defeated by the Yokohama DeNA BayStars in the Climax Series and did not advance to the Japan Series. In 2025, the team finished third in the Central League and was again eliminated by the Yokohama DeNA BayStars in the Climax Series, failing to reach the Japan Series.

Arrest and resignation in 2026

Abe was arrested on May 25, 2026, on suspicion of assaulting his daughter. He was released shortly after midnight the following day and, later that same day, held a press conference at which he announced his resignation as manager of the Yomiuri Giants. According to reports, Abe became angry after reprimanding his daughters, who had been arguing, and being talked back to by the elder daughter. He then grabbed her by the collar and threw her to the ground. Subsequently, the elder daughter sought advice from ChatGPT and was advised to contact child consultation services. After she made the report, the child consultation center notified the police, which ultimately led to Abe's arrest. According to the daughter, claims that she had been punched or kicked by her father are false, and she did not expect that the police would actually become involved.

== International career ==
He was selected Japan national baseball team at the 1997 Intercontinental Cup, 1999 Asian Baseball Championship, 2000 Summer Olympics, 2007 Asian Baseball Championship, 2008 Summer Olympics, 2009 World Baseball Classic, 2012 exhibition games against Cuba and 2013 World Baseball Classic.

Also, he was selected Nippon Professional Baseball All-Stars at the 2004 MLB Japan All-Star Series and the 2006 MLB Japan All-Star Series. On November 16, 2018, he was selected Yomiuri Giants roster at the 2018 MLB Japan All-Star Series exhibition game against MLB All-Stars.

== See also ==
- List of Nippon Professional Baseball career hits leaders
- List of top Nippon Professional Baseball home run hitters
- List of Nippon Professional Baseball players with 1,000 runs batted in
