= 2009 Japan Series =

Team (Wins)	Managers	Season
Yomiuri Giants (4)	Tatsunori Hara	89–46–9, (.659), GA: 12
Hokkaido Nippon-Ham Fighters (2)	Masataka Nashida	82–60–2, (.543), GA: 5.5
- Dates: October 31 – November 7
- MVP: Shinnosuke Abe (Yomiuri)
- FSA: Shinji Takahashi (Hokkaido)

Broadcast
- Television: TV Asahi (Game 1, cooperated by HTB); Fuji TV (Game 2, 6, cooperated by UHB); NTV (Game 3-5)
- Radio: JRN, NRN

The 2009 Japan Series was the Nippon Professional Baseball (NPB) championship series for the 2009 season. It was the 60th Japan Series and featured the Pacific League Climax Series champions, the Hokkaido Nippon-Ham Fighters, against the Central League Climax Series champions, the Yomiuri Giants. The series is the second time the two teams played each other in the championship series, the last time being 1981. Played at Sapporo Dome and Tokyo Dome, the Giants defeated the Fighters four games to two in the best-of-seven series to win the franchise's 21st Japan Series championship. Giants' captain Shinnosuke Abe was named Most Valuable Player of the series. The series was played between October 31 and November 7, 2009, with home field advantage going to the Pacific League.

== Climax Series ==
First Stage
Central League
2	Chunichi Dragons	2
3	Tokyo Yakult Swallows	1
Pacific League
2	Tohoku Rakuten Golden Eagles	2
3	Fukuoka SoftBank Hawks	0

Second Stage
1	Yomiuri Giants	4
2	Chunichi Dragons	1
1	Hokkaido Nippon-Ham Fighters	4
2	Tohoku Rakuten Golden Eagles	1

Japan Series
CL1	Yomiuri Giants	4
PL1	Hokkaido Nippon-Ham Fighters	2

== Summary ==
Yomiuri Giants won the series, 4–2.

Game	Date	Score	Location	Time	Attendance
1	October 31	Yomiuri Giants – 4, Hokkaido Nippon-Ham Fighters – 3	Sapporo Dome	3:18	40,650
2	November 1	Yomiuri Giants – 2, Hokkaido Nippon-Ham Fighters – 4	Sapporo Dome	2:52	40,718
3	November 3	Hokkaido Nippon-Ham Fighters – 4, Yomiuri Giants – 7	Tokyo Dome	3:11	45,150
4	November 4	Hokkaido Nippon-Ham Fighters – 8, Yomiuri Giants – 4	Tokyo Dome	3:38	45,133
5	November 5	Hokkaido Nippon-Ham Fighters – 2, Yomiuri Giants – 3	Tokyo Dome	2:57	45,160
6	November 7	Yomiuri Giants – 2, Hokkaido Nippon-Ham Fighters – 0	Sapporo Dome	3:02	40,714

== Game summaries ==
=== Game 1 ===
Saturday, October 31, 2009, 6:15 pm (JST) at Sapporo Dome in Sapporo, Hokkaido
Team	1	2	3	4	5	6	7	8	9	R	H	E
Yomiuri	0	1	0	0	2	0	1	0	0	4	8	0
Nippon-Ham	0	1	0	0	0	1	0	0	1	3	12	0
WP: Dicky Gonzalez (1–0) LP: Masaru Takeda (0–1) Sv: Marc Kroon (1); Home runs: YOM: Yoshitomo Tani (1); NHF: Terrmel Sledge (1)

After a scoreless first inning, Yoshitomo Tani hit a home run off of Fighters' starter Masaru Takeda to put the Giants up 1–0 in the top of the second inning. During the bottom half of the inning, however, Terrmel Sledge tied the game after hitting a solo home run off of Giants' starter Dicky Gonzalez. Hayato Sakamoto broke the tie in the fifth inning when he hit a double off the left field wall, scoring Tani and Shinnosuke Abe, who singled to open the inning.

Gonzalez was relieved by Tetsuya Yamaguchi in the sixth inning after he allowed Fighters' hitters to reach first and second with one out. The Giants' lead was then cut to one after Yamaguchi gave up an RBI single to Tomohiro Nioka before retiring the next two batters. The Giants responded when Yoshinori Tateyama relieved Takeda to start the seventh inning. Tateyama gave up a single to Tani before being replaced by Masanori Hayashi who immediately gave up a single to Abe. With runners at first and third, Noriyoshi Omichi was brought in as a pinch hitter, and Fighters' manager Masataka Nashida responded by bringing in Shintaro Ejiri. After this pitching change, Giants' manager Tatsunori Hara switched pinch hitters and sent Lee Seung-Yeop to the plate instead of Omichi. Ejiri gave up an RBI single to Lee then retired the next two batters, finishing out the top half of the inning with the Giants leading 4–2. Ejiri continued to pitch through a scoreless eighth inning and was followed up by Naoki Miyanishi, who kept the Giants hitless in the ninth.

After Yamaguchi pitched through a scoreless seventh inning, Daisuke Ochi put together a hitless eighth. In the ninth inning, the Fighters put the leadoff man on first against Giants' closer Marc Kroon. With two outs, Shinji Takahashi cut the Giants' lead to one run when he doubled off the wall in center. Kroon then put the winning run on first after he walked Sledge but earned a save after striking out the next batter, resulting in Gonzalez's first career postseason win.

=== Game 2 ===
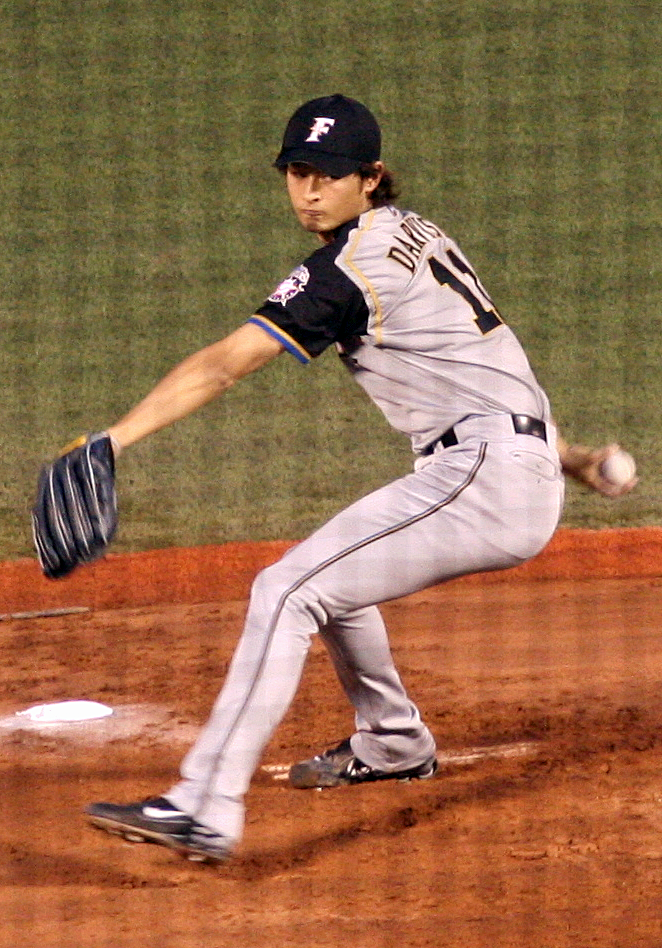
Due to injury, Yu Darvish (seen here in 2007) pitched for the first time in 43 days when he started Game 2.

Sunday, November 1, 2009, 6:16 pm (JST) at Sapporo Dome in Sapporo, Hokkaido
Team	1	2	3	4	5	6	7	8	9	R	H	E
Yomiuri	0	0	0	2	0	0	0	0	0	2	8	0
Nippon-Ham	0	0	4	0	0	0	0	0	X	4	12	0
WP: Yu Darvish (1–0) LP: Tetsuya Utsumi (0–1) Sv: Hisashi Takeda (1); Home runs: YOM: Yoshiyuki Kamei (1); NHF: Atsunori Inaba (1)

Despite experiencing back soreness and shoulder fatigue, Yu Darvish started Game 2 for the Fighters. Darvish had not pitched since September 20, 43 days before his surprising Game 2 start. A week before the series, trainer Seiichiro Nakagaki stated that it would be "virtually impossible for him to pitch in the series". Pitching coach Masato Yoshii echoed this belief when he stated that he would require a "miraculous recovery" to pitch in time for the series. Darvish was seen practicing before Saturday's series opener, however, prompting some speculation that he would make an appearance in the series. During the game, spectators noticed that Darvish had altered his pitching form—he shortened his stride to prevent aggravating his lower back injury. After the series, Darvish assessed his health and believed that he was "about 50 percent".

The Giants started Tetsuya Utsumi, who had not pitched since a regular season game on October 12. He pitched into the third inning, where, with two outs, he gave up a solo home run to Atsunori Inaba. Shinji Takahashi then doubled and quickly scored on an RBI single by the next batter, Terrmel Sledge. The Fighters continued to produce offense as Eiichi Koyano reached base on an infield single. Sledge and Koyano both scored on Yoshio Itoi's right field double. Utsumi was then relieved by Shun Tono, who ended the Fighters' four-run third inning. The Giants cut the Fighters' lead in half by scoring two runs in the top of the fourth inning. With two outs, Alex Ramírez singled before Yoshiyuki Kamei hit a home run off the left field foul pole.

Darvish continued to pitch into the sixth inning after getting out of a fifth inning bases-loaded situation by striking out former teammate Michihiro Ogasawara. Relieving Darvish at the start of the seventh inning, Naoki Miyanishi pitched a scoreless inning, while Takayuki Kanamori followed it up with a scoreless inning of his own. Closer Hisashi Takeda then earned a save after completing a scoreless ninth to secure the win for the Fighters 4–2.

=== Game 3 ===
Tuesday, November 3, 2009, 6:00 pm (JST) at Tokyo Dome in Bunkyō, Tokyo
Team	1	2	3	4	5	6	7	8	9	R	H	E
Nippon-Ham	1	1	0	0	1	0	0	1	0	4	4	0
Yomiuri	0	2	1	0	2	0	0	2	X	7	8	3
WP: Wirfin Obispo (1–0) LP: Keisaku Itokazu (0–1) Sv: Marc Kroon (2); Home runs: NHF: Atsunori Inaba (2), Eiichi Koyano (1), Kensuke Tanaka (1); YOM: Lee Seung-Yeop (1), Shinnosuke Abe (1), Michihiro Ogasawara (1)

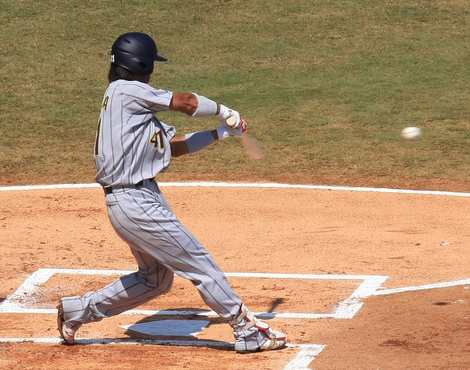
Atsunori Inaba's (seen here in 2008) first-inning home run was the first of six total by both teams.

Wearing a Giants' jacket, former U.S. President and US Major League Baseball team owner George W. Bush threw the ceremonial first pitch to Giants' catcher Shinnosuke Abe prior to Game 3. Bush watched the game from a private box with former Japanese Prime Minister Junichiro Koizumi, U.S. Ambassador John Roos and former Giants' player and manager Sadaharu Oh.

In the first inning, Atsunori Inaba hit a solo home run off Giants' starter Wirfin Obispo. Eiichi Koyano put the Fighters up 2–0 with a solo home run of his own in the second. The home runs continued during the Giants' half of the inning when both Lee Seung-Yeop and Shinnosuke Abe hit solo shots off Fighters' starter Keisaku Itokazu. A Michihiro Ogasawara home run then gave the Giants a one-run lead in the bottom of the third. After a scoreless fourth inning, Kensuke Tanaka tied it up with the game's final home run in the fifth. Both teams' combined six home runs narrowly missed tying the Japan Series record of seven achieved by the Giants and Kintetsu Buffaloes during 1989's Game 7.

With two outs in the bottom of the fifth inning, Itokazu walked Hayato Sakamoto then gave up a single to Tetsuya Matsumoto. Ogasawara brought in both runners when he doubled to left-center field, putting the Giants up 5-3. Masanori Hayashi replaced Itokazu at the start of the sixth to retire three straight Giants batters. After relieving Obispo to start the seventh, Daisuke Ochi pitched a scoreless half-inning. Brought in to pitch in the eighth inning, Tetsuya Yamaguchi hit the first batter, Tanaka; two consecutive errors then allowed Tanaka to score, cutting the Giants' lead to one.

Fighters pitcher Kazumasa Kikuchi, who had pitched a scoreless seventh inning, was relieved by Shintaro Ejiri in the eighth after putting two batters on base. Abe gave the Giants two insurance runs when he drove home both of Ejiri's inherited runners with a two-out single. Kroon was brought in to start the ninth; despite allowing a base runner on the Giants' third error of the game, Kroon preserved the team's three-run lead. The win marked the Giants' 100th Series victory in franchise history.

=== Game 4 ===
Wednesday, November 4, 2009, 6:00 pm (JST) at Tokyo Dome in Bunkyō, Tokyo
Team	1	2	3	4	5	6	7	8	9	R	H	E
Nippon-Ham	0	0	4	0	1	0	2	1	0	8	11	1
Yomiuri	0	0	1	0	0	0	0	3	0	4	13	0
WP: Tomoya Yagi (1–0) LP: Hisanori Takahashi (0–1) Sv: Hisashi Takeda (2); Home runs: NHF: Shinji Takahashi (1); YOM: Alex Ramírez (1)

=== Game 5 ===
Thursday, November 5, 2009, 6:00 pm (JST) at Tokyo Dome in Bunkyō, Tokyo
Team	1	2	3	4	5	6	7	8	9	R	H	E
Nippon-Ham	0	1	0	0	0	0	0	0	1	2	4	1
Yomiuri	0	0	0	0	0	0	0	1	2	3	7	2
WP: Tetsuya Yamaguchi (1-0) LP: Hisashi Takeda (0-1); Home runs: NHF: Shinji Takahashi (2); YOM: Yoshiyuki Kamei (2), Shinnosuke Abe (2)

=== Game 6 ===
Saturday, November 7, 2009, 6:16 pm (JST) at Sapporo Dome in Sapporo, Hokkaido
Team	1	2	3	4	5	6	7	8	9	R	H	E
Yomiuri	0	1	0	0	0	1	0	0	0	2	6	0
Nippon-Ham	0	0	0	0	0	0	0	0	0	0	11	1
WP: Tetsuya Utsumi (1–1) LP: Masaru Takeda (0-2) Sv: Marc Kroon (3)

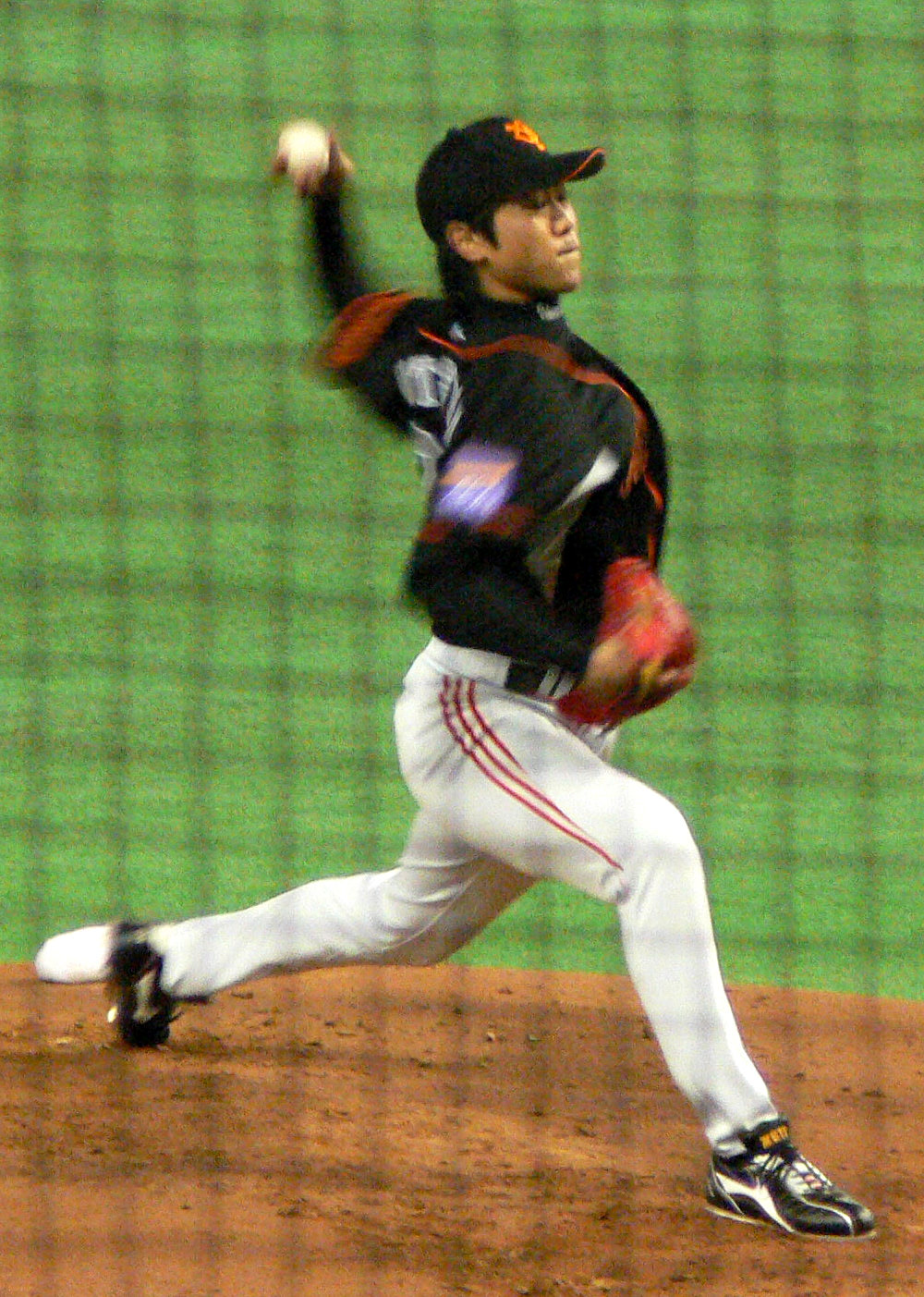
Tetsuya Utsumi (seen here in 2006) received a Game 6 win after replacing the injured Shun Tono in the first inning.

For Game 6, the Giants decided to skip starting pitcher Tetsuya Utsumi after he allowed four runs in two and two-thirds innings in game two; pitcher Shun Tono started the game in his place. However, after facing four batters, Tono was forced to leave the game in the first inning after a hit by Shinji Takahashi struck him on his right wrist. Inheriting runners on second and third with two outs, Utsumi entered the game and retired Terrmel Sledge for the final out of the inning.

In the top of the second inning, Yoshiyuki Kamei reached base with a one-out double off of Fighters' starter Masaru Takeda and advanced to third base on a Yoshitomo Tani ground out. Kamei then scored when Shinnosuke Abe doubled to deep center field, giving the Giants the lead. In the top of the sixth inning, Takeda gave up a two-out single to Tetsuya Matsumoto. Fighters right fielder Atsunori Inaba then fell down while attempting to field a ball hit by Michihiro Ogasawara, resulting in the game's only error. This error allowed Matsumoto to score from first base. Utsumi continued to pitch into the bottom of the inning until he was relieved by Kiyoshi Toyoda. Utsumi's scoreless four and two-thirds innings (eventually resulting in a win) was seen as a redemption after his short Game 2 outing and four previous Japan Series losses.

Takeda pitched a scoreless seventh inning, followed by Giants reliever Tetsuya Yamaguchi who did the same in the bottom of the inning. Takeda pitched into the eighth inning until he was relieved by Shintaro Ejiri, who closed out the top of the inning. In the bottom of the inning, Daisuke Ochi surrendered a leadoff single followed by two strikeouts and a walk. Kroon was then brought in to face pinch hitter Tomochika Tsuboi who grounded out to finish the eighth inning. After Fighters closer Masanori Hayashi held the Giants to two runs in the final inning, Kroon gave up a leadoff double to Tomohiro Nioka and allowed the pinch runner to reach third later in the inning. He then struck out Inaba and Takahashi to achieve the four-out save and secure the series. Despite having runners on base every inning and leaving a total of 13 on base, the Giants completed a six-pitcher shutout.

== See also ==
- 2009 Korean Series
- 2009 World Series
