= 2009 Hanshin Tigers season =

The 2009 Hanshin Tigers season features the Tigers quest to win their first Central League title since 2005.

== Regular season ==
=== Standings ===
2009 Central League regular season standings
Team	Pld	W	L	T	PCT	GB
Yomiuri Giants	144	89	46	9	.649	—
Chunichi Dragons	144	81	62	1	.566	12
Tokyo Yakult Swallows	144	71	72	1	.497	22
Hanshin Tigers	144	67	73	4	.479	24.5
Hiroshima Carp	144	65	75	4	.465	26.5
Yokohama BayStars	144	51	93	0	.354	42.5

=== Game log ===
2009 Game Log
April

#	Date	Opponent	Score	Win	Loss	Save	Attendance	Record
1	April 3	Swallows	5 - 2	Ando (1-0)	Ishikawa (0-1)	Fujikawa (1)	33,792	1-0-0
2	April 4	Swallows	1 - 5	Sato (1-0)	Nomi (0-1)		33,449	1-1-0
3	April 5	Swallows	6 - 7	Kawashima (1-0)	Fukuhara (0-1)	Lim (1)	33,436	1-2-0
4	April 7	Carp	11 - 10	Egusa (1-0)	Nagakawa (0-1)		46,307	2-2-0
5	April 8	Carp	8 - 2	Shimoyanagi (1-0)	Saito (0-1)		42,300	3-2-0
6	April 9	Carp	2 - 4	Hasegawa (1-0)	Ishikawa (0-1)	Nagakawa (3)	38,733	3-3-0
7	April 10	@Giants	6 - 5	Ochi (1-0)	Egusa (1-1)	Kroon (1)	43,356	3-4-0
8	April 11	@Giants	4 - 1	Tono (1-0)	Nomi (0-2)	Kroon (2)	44,284	3-5-0
9	April 12	@Giants	6 - 6 (12)	Game tied after 12 innings			44,246	3-5-1
—	April 14	Dragons	Postponed (rained out)					
10	April 15	Dragons	2 - 9	Asakura (1-0)	Shimoyanagi (1-1)		40,476	3-6-1
11	April 16	Dragons	4 - 3	Atchison (1-0)	Asao (1-2)	Fujikawa (2)	40,195	4-6-1
12	April 17	@BayStars	1 - 5	Ando (2-0)	Miura (1-2)		12,250	5-6-1
13	April 18	@BayStars	4 - 9	Nomi (1-2)	Glynn (0-3)		25,773	6-6-1
14	April 19	@BayStars	4 - 2	Kobayashi (1-1)	Fukuhara (0-2)	Ishii (4)	24,491	6-7-1
15	April 21	@Dragons	2 - 1	Asakura (2-0)	Shimoyanagi (1-2)	Iwase (3)	30,434	6-8-1
16	April 22	@Dragons	6 - 2	Asao (2-2)	Kubo (0-1)	Iwase (4)	31,650	6-9-1
17	April 23	@Dragons	1 - 4 (12)	Fujikawa (1-0)	Nelson (0-2)		30,850	7-9-1
18	April 24	@Carp	0 - 4	Nomi (2-2)	Maeda (2-2)		24,417	8-9-1
19	April 25	@Carp	1 - 12	Fukuhara (1-2)	Hasegawa (1-1)		28,400	9-9-1
20	April 26	@Carp	2 - 1	Shinoda (2-1)	Atchison (1-1)	Nagakawa (7)	30,528	9-10-1
21	April 28	BayStars	8 - 4	Egusa (2-1)	Yoshikawa (0-1)		19,163	10-10-1
22	April 29	BayStars	4 - 7	Walrond (1-2)	Ando (2-1)	Ishii (6)	46,431	10-11-1
23	April 30	BayStars	3 - 2	Atchison (2-1)	Ishii (0-2)		45,758	11-11-1

May

#	Date	Opponent	Score	Win	Loss	Save	Attendance	Record
24	May 2	Giants	5 - 6	Yamaguchi (3-0)	Fujikawa (1-1)	Ochi (2)	46,425	11-12-1
25	May 3	Giants	0 - 4	Gonzalez (1-0)	Cheng (0-1)		46,440	11-13-1
26	May 4	Giants	6 - 0	Shimoyanagi (2-2)	Utsumi (0-3)		46,434	12-13-1
—	May 5	@Swallows	Postponed (rained out)					
—	May 6	@Swallows	Postponed (rained out)					
27	May 7	@Swallows	2 - 1	Ishikawa (4-1)	Kubo(0-2)	Lim (9)	15,575	12-14-1
28	May 8	@BayStars	2 - 0	Miura (4-2)	Ando (2-2)		13,467	12-15-1
29	May 9	@BayStars	4 - 0	Glynn (2-4)	Nomi (2-3)		23,464	12-16-1
30	May 10	@BayStars	4 - 12	Fukuhara (2-2)	Kobayashi (1-2)		23,963	13-16-1
31	May 12	Carp	1 - 0	Shimoyanagi (3-2)	Yokoyama (0-2)		41,558	14-16-1
32	May 13	Carp	1 - 2 (10)	Yokoyama (1-2)	Fujikawa (1-2)	Nagakawa (11)	43,899	14-17-1
33	May 14	Carp	7 - 1	Ando (3-2)	Maeda (2-4)		40,599	15-17-1
34	May 15	@Swallows	2 - 1	Matsuoka (2-0)	Nomi (2-4)	Lim (12)	22,528	15-18-1
35	May 16	@Swallows	4 - 1	Tateyama (4-0)	Fukuhara (2-3)	Lim (13)	28,380	15-19-1
36	May 17	@Swallows	2 - 1	Kawashima (3-2)	Egusa (2-2)	Igarashi (1)	19,534	15-20-1
37	May 19	@Hawks	1 - 1 (12)	Game tied after 12 innings			33,182	15-20-2
38	May 20	@Hawks	3 - 2 (10)	Settsu (2-2)	Egusa (2-3)		29,258	15-21-2
39	May 22	@Buffaloes	8 - 3	Kaneko (4-3)	Ando (3-3)	Kato (7)	23,433	15-22-2
40	May 23	@Buffaloes	3 - 7	Atchison (3-1)	Vogelsong (0-1)		28,031	16-22-2
—	May 24	Marines	No game (called after 4 innings)					
41	May 25	Marines	4 - 3	Kubo (1-2)	Shimizu (1-3)	Fujikawa (3)	43,474	17-22-2
42	May 26	Marines	2 - 3	Sikorski (4-2)	Fujikawa (1-3)	Ogino (7)	26,680	17-23-2
43	May 27	Lions	4 - 1	Shimoyanagi (4-2)	Ishii (2-4)	Fujikawa (4)	46,160	18-23-2
44	May 28	Lions	4 - 6	Wakui (5-2)	Ando (3-4)	Onodera (4)	44,395	18-24-2
45	May 30	@Fighters	8 - 2	Darvish (7-1)	Fukuhara (2-4)		42,328	18-25-2
46	May 31	@Fighters	4 - 4 (12)	Game tied after 12 innings			42,051	18-25-3

June

#	Date	Opponent	Score	Win	Loss	Save	Attendance	Record
47	June 2	@Eagles	3 - 2	Rasner (3-3)	Kubo (1-3)	Aoyama (3)	20,128	18-26-3
48	June 3	@Eagles	2 - 3					19-26-3
49	June 5	Buffaloes	4 - 0					20-26-3
50	June 6	Buffaloes	7 - 0					21-26-3
51	June 7	Hawks	4 - 3					22-26-3
52	June 8	Hawks	1 - 8					22-27-3
53	June 10	@Lions	4 - 3					22-28-3
54	June 11	@Lions	6 - 5					22-29-3
55	June 13	@Marines	9 - 1					22-30-3
56	June 14	@Marines	4 - 1					22-31-3
57	June 16	Fighters	4 - 3					23-31-3
58	June 17	Fighters	5 - 10					23-32-3
59	June 20	Eagles	2 - 5					23-33-3
60	June 21	Eagles	4 - 2					24-33-3
61	June 26	BayStars	9 - 4					25-33-3
62	June 27	BayStars	3 - 5					25-34-3
63	June 28	BayStars	3 - 2					26-34-3
64	June 30	@Dragons	5 - 4					26-35-3

July

#	Date	Opponent	Score	Win	Loss	Save	Attendance	Record
65	July 1	@Dragons	4 - 1					26-36-3
66	July 2	@Dragons	3 - 5					27-36-3
67	July 3	Swallows	7 - 2					28-36-3
68	July 4	Swallows	3 - 6					28-37-3
69	July 5	Swallows	4 - 1					29-37-3
70	July 7	@Carp	8 - 1					29-38-3
71	July 8	@Carp	3 - 1					29-39-3
72	July 10	Giants	5 - 7					29-40-3
73	July 11	Giants	2 - 2	Game tied after 12 innings				29-40-4
74	July 12	Giants	1 - 2					29-41-4
75	July 14	Dragons	5 - 4					30-41-4
76	July 15	Dragons	1 - 6					30-42-4
77	July 16	Dragons	4 - 6					30-43-4
78	July 17	@Giants	1 - 5					31-43-4
79	July 18	@Giants	11 - 4					31-44-4
80	July 19	@Giants	0 - 1					32-44-4
81	July 20	Swallows	2 - 3					32-45-4
—	July 21	Swallows	Postponed (rained out)					
82	July 22	Swallows	0 - 5					32-46-4
83	July 28	BayStars	5 - 4					33-46-4
84	July 29	BayStars	8 - 0					34-46-4
85	July 30	BayStars	2 - 0					35-46-4
86	July 31	Giants	3 - 2					36-46-4

August

#	Date	Opponent	Score	Win	Loss	Save	Attendance	Record
87	August 1	Giants	2 - 4					36-47-4
88	August 2	Giants	7 - 4					37-47-4
89	August 3	@Dragons	7 - 0					37-48-4
90	August 4	@Dragons	3 - 1					37-49-4
91	August 5	@Dragons	2 - 9					38-49-4
92	August 7	@Carp	0 - 4					39-49-4
93	August 8	@Carp	8 - 0					39-50-4
94	August 9	@Carp	7 - 3					39-51-4
95	August 11	Dragons	1 - 3					39-52-4
96	August 12	Dragons	6 - 1					40-52-4
97	August 13	Dragons	2 - 9					40-53-4
98	August 14	@Giants	4 - 7					41-53-4
99	August 15	@Giants	9 - 7					41-54-4
100	August 16	@Giants	2 - 5					42-54-4
101	August 18	@Swallows	1 - 4					43-54-4
102	August 19	@Swallows	4 - 2					43-55-4
103	August 20	@Swallows	2 - 10					44-55-4
104	August 21	Carp	0 - 9					44-56-4
105	August 22	Carp	2 - 1					45-56-4
106	August 23	Carp	8 - 2					46-56-4
107	August 25	@BayStars	3 - 4					47-56-4
108	August 26	@BayStars	3 - 9					48-56-4
109	August 27	@BayStars	4 - 1					48-57-4
110	August 28	Giants	5 - 1					49-57-4
111	August 29	Giants	5 - 7					49-58-4
112	August 30	Giants	3 - 1					50-58-4

September

#	Date	Opponent	Score	Win	Loss	Save	Attendance	Record
113	September 1	Swallows	6 - 1					51-58-4
114	September 2	Swallows	9 - 4					52-58-4
115	September 3	Swallows	2 - 4					52-59-4
116	September 4	@Carp	0 - 2					53-59-4
117	September 5	@Carp	5 - 2					53-60-4
118	September 6	@Carp	1 - 4					54-60-4
119	September 8	Dragons	0 - 7					54-61-4
120	September 9	Dragons	4 - 0					55-61-4
121	September 10	Dragons	2 - 4					55-62-4
122	September 11	BayStars	2 - 1					56-62-4
123	September 12	BayStars	2 - 4					56-63-4
124	September 13	BayStars	2 - 1					57-63-4
125	September 15	@Giants	3 - 5					58-63-4
126	September 16	@Giants	6 - 7					59-63-4
127	September 17	@Giants	4 - 2					59-64-4
128	September 18	Carp	4 - 5					59-65-4
129	September 19	Carp	3 - 4					59-66-4
130	September 20	Carp	14 - 2					60-66-4
131	September 21	@BayStars	8 - 1					60-67-4
132	September 22	@BayStars	7 - 2					60-68-4
133	September 23	@BayStars	3 - 6					61-68-4
134	September 25	@Dragons	2 - 5					62-68-4
135	September 26	@Dragons	10 - 7					62-69-4
136	September 27	@Dragons	2 - 7					63-69-4
137	September 28	@Swallows	7 - 1					63-70-4
138	September 29	@Swallows	2 - 8					64-70-4
139	September 30	@Swallows	1 - 7					65-70-4

October

#	Date	Opponent	Score	Win	Loss	Save	Attendance	Record
140	October 3	Swallows	4 - 6					65-71-4
141	October 4	Dragons	5 - 0					66-71-4
142	October 7	@Carp	1 - 5					67-71-4
143	October 8	@Swallows	5 - 0					67-72-4
144	October 9	@Swallows	3 - 1					67-73-4

== Player stats ==
=== Batting ===
Player	G	AB	H	Avg.	HR	RBI	SB

=== Pitching ===
Player	G	GS	IP	W	L	SV	ERA	SO
