= 2009 Hiroshima Toyo Carp season =

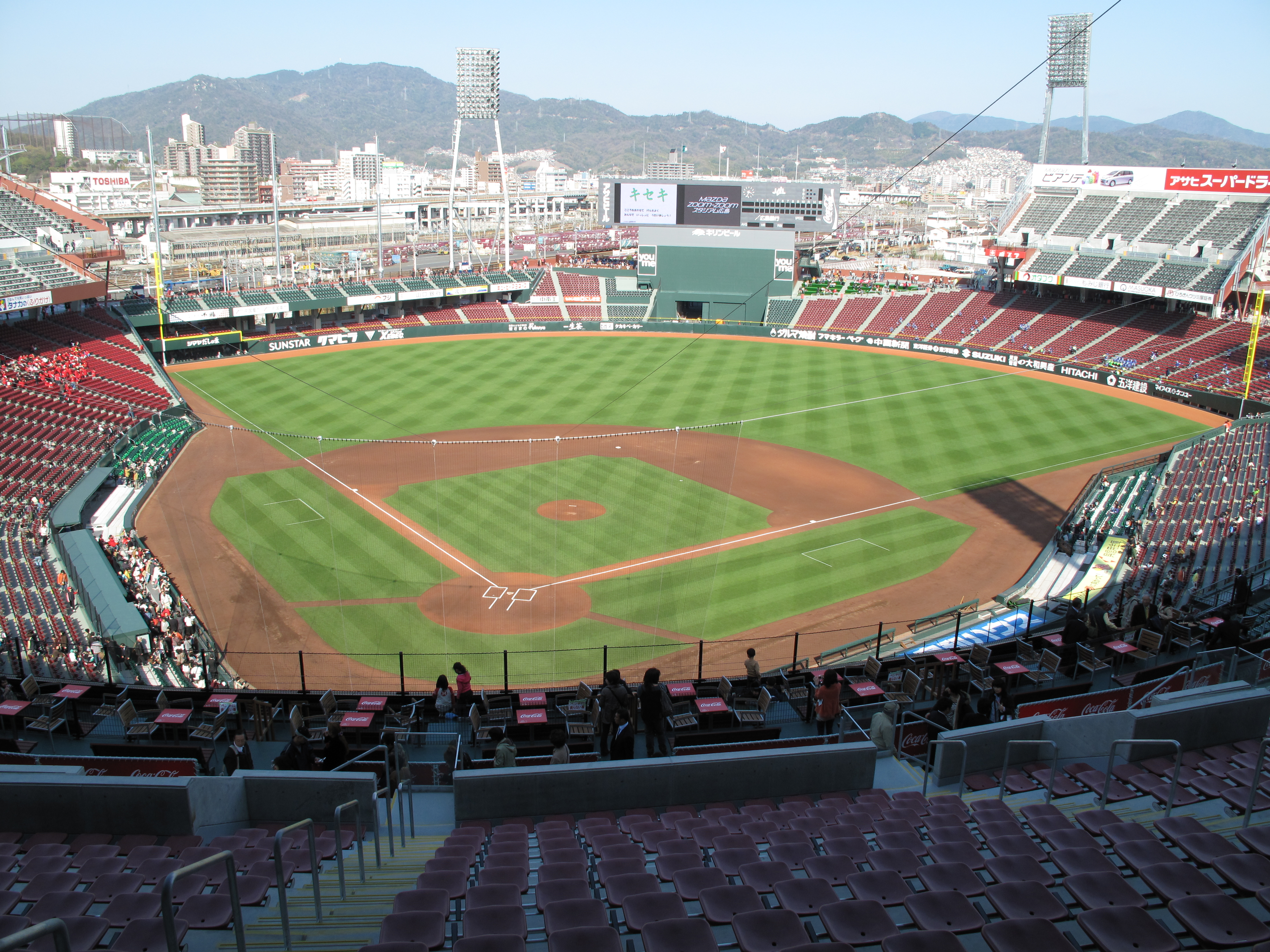
Mazda Zoom-Zoom Stadium in Hiroshima, 2 April 2009

The 2009 Hiroshima Toyo Carp season features the Carp quest to win their first Central League title since 1991. The Hiroshima Toyo Carp drew an average home attendance of 26,015 in 2009.

== Regular season ==
=== Standings ===
2009 Central League regular season standings
Team	Pld	W	L	T	PCT	GB
Yomiuri Giants	144	89	46	9	.649	—
Chunichi Dragons	144	81	62	1	.566	12
Tokyo Yakult Swallows	144	71	72	1	.497	22
Hanshin Tigers	144	67	73	4	.479	24.5
Hiroshima Carp	144	65	75	4	.465	26.5
Yokohama BayStars	144	51	93	0	.354	42.5

=== Game log ===
2009 Game Log
April

#	Date	Opponent	Score	Win	Loss	Save	Attendance	Record
1	April 3	@Giants	3 - 6	Lewis (1-0)	Greisinger (0-1)	Nagakawa (1)	44,124	1-0-0
2	April 4	@Giants	3 - 5	K. Maeda (1-0)	Nakamura (0-1)	Nagakawa (2)	42,650	2-0-0
3	April 5	@Giants	1 - 1 (12)	Game tied after 12 innings			42,275	2-0-1
4	April 7	@Tigers	11 - 10	Egusa (1-0)	Nagakawa (0-1)		46,307	2-1-1
5	April 8	@Tigers	8 - 2	Shimoyanagi (1-0)	Saito (0-1)		42,300	2-2-1
6	April 9	@Tigers	2 - 4	Hasegawa (1-0)	Ishikawa (0-1)	Nagakawa (3)	38,733	3-2-1
7	April 10	Dragons	3 - 11	Yoshimi (2-0)	Lewis (1-1)	Nelson (1)	30,618	3-3-1
8	April 11	Dragons	2 - 0	K. Maeda (2-0)	Shimizu (0-1)		30,268	4-3-1
9	April 12	Dragons	10 - 0	Shinoda (1-0)	Yamamoto (0-1)		30,139	5-3-1
10	April 14	BayStars	1 - 4	Terahara (1-1)	Otake (1-1)	Ishii (2)	13,436	5-4-1
11	April 15	BayStars	3 - 2	Umetsu (1-0)	Mastny (0-1)	Nagakawa (4)	17,288	6-4-1
12	April 16	BayStars	1 - 2 (10)	Yamaguchi (2-0)	Nagakawa (0-2)	Ishii (3)	14,476	6-5-1
13	April 17	@Swallows	6 - 1	Ishikawa (2-1)	T. Aoki (0-1)		10,865	6-6-1
14	April 18	@Swallows	1 - 0	Sato (2-1)	K. Maeda (2-1)	Lim (4)	25,455	6-7-1
15	April 19	@Swallows	8 - 2	R. Kawashima (2-1)	Shinoda (1-1)		17,702	6-8-1
—	April 21	@BayStars	Postponed (rained out)					
16	April 22	@BayStars	4 - 5	Schultz (1-0)	Ishii (0-1)	Nagakawa (5)	16,948	7-8-1
17	April 23	@BayStars	2 - 0	Saito (1-1)	Walrond (0-2)	Nagakawa (6)	16,772	8-8-1
18	April 24	Tigers	0 - 4	Nomi (2-2)	K. Maeda (2-2)		24,417	8-9-1
19	April 25	Tigers	1 - 12	Fukuhara (1-2)	Hasegawa (1-1)		28,400	8-10-1
20	April 26	Tigers	2 - 1	Shinoda (2-1)	Atchison (1-1)	Nagakawa (7)	30,528	9-10-1
21	April 28	Giants	5 - 0	Otake (1-1)	Utsumi (0-2)		24,423	10-10-1
22	April 29	Giants	2 - 0	Saito (2-1)	Tono (2-1)	Nagakawa (8)	31,773	11-10-1
23	April 30	Giants	4 - 7	Fukuda (2-0)	K. Maeda (2-3)	Ochi (1-1)	26,322	11-11-1

May

#	Date	Opponent	Score	Win	Loss	Save	Attendance	Record
24	May 2	Swallows	9 - 2	Umetsu (2-0)	Ichiba (1-2)		31,427	12-11-1
25	May 3	Swallows	2 - 3	Kida (3-2)	Yokoyama (0-1)	Lim (7)	31,622	12-12-1
26	May 4	Swallows	3 - 5	Oshimoto (1-2)	Makino (0-1)	Lim (8)	31,834	12-13-1
27	May 5	@Dragons	0 - 2	Otake (2-1)	Asakura (2-2)	Nagakawa (9)	37,494	13-13-1
28	May 6	@Dragons	4 - 2	Asao (3-3)	Saito (2-2)	Iwase (6)	36,159	13-14-1
29	May 7	@Dragons	4 - 3	Saito (2-0)	Umetsu (2-1)		26,978	13-15-1
30	May 9	@Swallows	1 - 4	Lewis (2-1)	R. Kawashima (2-2)	Nagakawa (10)	19,119	14-15-1
31	May 10	@Swallows	4 - 1	Tateyama (3-0)	Hayashi (0-1)	Lim (10)	14,891	14-16-1
32	May 12	@Tigers	1 - 0	Shimoyanagi (3-2)	Yokoyama (0-2)		41,558	14-17-1
33	May 13	@Tigers	1 - 2 (10)	Yokoyama (1-2)	Fujikawa (1-2)	Nagakawa (11)	43,899	15-17-1
34	May 14	@Tigers	7 - 1	Ando (3-2)	K. Maeda (2-4)		40,599	15-18-1
35	May 15	Giants	2 - 5	Gonzalez (3-0)	T. Aoki (0-2)	Kroon (7)	30,164	15-19-1
36	May 16	Giants	0 - 0 (12)	Game tied after 12 innings			29,794	15-19-2
37	May 17	Giants	1 - 2	Ochi (3-1)	Nagakawa (0-3)	Kroon (8)	29,707	15-20-2
38	May 19	@Buffaloes	1 - 9	Otake (3-1)	Kondo (3-3)		9,887	16-20-2
39	May 20	@Buffaloes	10 - 3	Yamamoto (3-2)	K. Maeda (2-5)		11,107	16-21-2
40	May 22	@Hawks	6 - 3	Wada (3-2)	Lewis (2-2)	Mahara (6)	29,327	16-22-2
41	May 23	@Hawks	5 - 4	Mizuta (2-0)	Saito (2-3)	Mahara (7)	32,221	16-23-2
42	May 24	Lions	7 - 5	Komatsu (1-0)	Nishiguchi (3-2)	Nagakawa (12)	28,309	17-23-2
43	May 25	Lions	3 - 0	Otake (4-1)	Kishi (6-1)	Nagakawa (13)	24,558	18-23-2
44	May 27	Marines	8 - 3	K. Maeda (3-5)	Karakawa (4-3)		22,513	19-23-2
45	May 28	Marines	4 - 3	Lewis (3-2)	H. Kobayashi (0-4)	Nagakawa (14)	12,048	20-23-2
—	May 30	@Eagles	Postponed (rained out)					
46	May 31	@Eagles	4 - 5	Otake (5-1)	Iwakuma (5-3)	Nagakawa (15)	18,015	21-23-2

June

#	Date	Opponent	Score	Win	Loss	Save	Attendance	Record
47	June 1	@Eagles	0 - 2	Saito (3-3)	Hasebe (3-4)	Nagakawa (16)	10,402	22-23-2
48	June 2	@Fighters	1-2	K. Maeda (4-5)	Itokazu (0-2)	Nagakawa (17)	20,252	23-23-2
49	June 3	@Fighters	7-2	Tateyama (2-2)	Yokoyama (1-3)		22,257	23-24-2
50	June 5	Hawks	4-1 (7)	Mori (1-0)	Ohba (0-2)	Schultz (1)	28,814	24-24-2
51	June 6	Hawks	1-11 (7)	Germano (1-0)	Ohtake (5-2)		31,737	24-25-2
52	June 7	Buffaloes	6-1	Sato (4-3)	Hirano (2-2)		28,747	25-25-2
53	June 8	Buffaloes						
54	June 10	@Marines						
55	June 11	@Marines						
56	June 13	@Lions						
57	June 14	@Lions						
58	June 17	Eagles						
59	June 18	Eagles						
60	June 20	Fighters						
61	June 21	Fighters						
62	June 26	Dragons						
63	June 27	Dragons						
64	June 28	Dragons						
65	June 30	@Giants						

== Player stats ==
=== Batting ===
Player	G	AB	H	Avg.	HR	RBI	SB

=== Pitching ===
Player	G	GS	IP	W	L	SV	ERA	SO
