= 2009 Yokohama BayStars season =

Japanese baseball team season

The 2009 Yokohama BayStars season features the BayStars quest to win their first Central League title since 1998. The team made a bit of a splash just before the season, signing former Hokkaido Nippon Ham Fighters starter Ryan Glynn to shore up their rotation, led by veterans Daisuke Miura and Hayato Terahara.

On the offensive side, the 'Stars picked up Dan Johnson, a journeyman minor leaguer, to give protection to 2008 batting champion Seiichi Uchikawa and slugging third baseman Shuichi Murata.

The year did not start well even before the regular season started. The 'Stars lost Murata to a pulled hamstring muscle during the 2009 World Baseball Classic in a seeding game against Team Japan's arch-rival Korea. The injury hurt the team in the worst way, as Yokohama's bad luck with batting with runners in scoring position continued from 2008. The BayStars scored just five runs in their first six games en route to another rough start in April.

Towards the end of May, BayStars manager Akihiko Ohya announced that he was taking a sabbatical, which turned into his resignation. Ohya's sudden resignation ended his second tenure as Yokohama manager. He had been manager previously from 1996 to 1997 and helped to put together the 1998 Japan Series Championship team. Ni-gun manager Tomio Tashiro was called on to replace Ohya, and he seemed to be the logical choice since he had been successful managing the ni-gun Shonan SeaRex. However, Tashiro could not turn the team's fortunes around as the team stumbled to another last-place finish in the Central League.

== Regular season ==
=== Standings ===
2009 Central League regular season standings
Team	Pld	W	L	T	PCT	GB
Yomiuri Giants	144	89	46	9	.649	—
Chunichi Dragons	144	81	62	1	.566	12
Tokyo Yakult Swallows	144	71	72	1	.497	22
Hanshin Tigers	144	67	73	4	.479	24.5
Hiroshima Carp	144	65	75	4	.465	26.5
Yokohama BayStars	144	51	93	0	.354	42.5

=== Game log ===
2009 Game Log
April

#	Date	Opponent	Score	Win	Loss	Save	Attendance	Record
1	April 3	@Dragons	4 - 1	Asao (1-0)	Miura (0-1)	Iwase (1)	37,678	0-1-0
2	April 4	@Dragons	6 - 0	Yoshimi (1-0)	Glynn (0-1)		36,528	0-2-0
3	April 5	@Dragons	6 - 0	Chen (1-0)	Kobayashi (0-1)		33,496	0-3-0
4	April 7	Giants	1 - 5	Takahashi (1-0)	Terahara (0-1)		20,168	0-4-0
5	April 8	Giants	1 - 12	Fukuda (1-0)	Kudoh (0-1)		16,361	0-5-0
6	April 9	Giants	2 - 9	Greisinger (1-1)	Walrond (0-1)		16,691	0-6-0
7	April 10	Swallows	9 - 1	Miura (1-1)	Sato (1-1)		12,791	1-6-0
8	April 11	Swallows	0 - 3	Ichiba (1-0)	Glynn (0-2)	Lim (3)	17,817	1-7-0
9	April 12	Swallows	5 - 3	Yamaguchi (1-0)	Kawashima (1-1)	Ishii (1)	17,972	2-7-0
10	April 14	@Carp	1 - 4	Terahara (1-1)	Otake (1-1)	Ishii (2)	13,436	3-7-0
11	April 15	@Carp	3 - 2	Umetsu (1-0)	Mastny (0-1)	Nagakawa (4)	17,288	3-8-0
12	April 16	@Carp	1 - 2 (10)	Yamaguchi (2-0)	Nagakawa (0-2)	Ishii (3)	14,476	4-8-0
13	April 17	Tigers	1 - 5	Ando (2-0)	Miura (1-2)		12,250	4-9-0
14	April 18	Tigers	4 - 9	Nomi (1-2)	Glynn (0-3)		25,773	4-10-0
15	April 19	Tigers	4 - 2	Kobayashi (1-1)	Fukuhara (0-2)	Ishii (4)	24,491	5-10-0
—	April 21	Carp	Postponed (rained out)					
16	April 22	Carp	4 - 5	Schultz (1-0)	Ishii (0-1)	Nagakawa (5)	16,948	5-11-0
17	April 23	Carp	2 - 0	Saito (1-1)	Walrond (0-2)	Nagakawa (6)	16,772	5-12-0
18	April 24	@Swallows	0 - 3	Miura (2-2)	Ichiba (1-1)	Ishii (5)	12,512	6-12-0
—	April 25	@Swallows	Postponed (rained out)					
19	April 26	@Swallows	2 - 6	Glynn (1-3)	Sato (2-2)		16,185	7-12-0
20	April 28	@Tigers	8 - 4	Egusa (2-1)	Yoshikawa (0-1)		19,163	7-13-0
21	April 29	@Tigers	4 - 7	Walrond (1-2)	Ando (2-1)	Ishii (6)	46,431	8-13-0
22	April 30	@Tigers	3 - 2	Atchison (2-1)	Ishii (0-2)		45,758	8-14-0

May

#	Date	Opponent	Score	Win	Loss	Save	Attendance	Record
23	May 2	Dragons	6 - 1	Miura (3-2)	Yamai (0-1)		21,080	9-14-0
24	May 3	Dragons	0 - 2	Chen (2-1)	Glynn (1-4)		23,920	9-15-0
25	May 4	Dragons	2 - 4	Saito (1-0)	Ishii (0-3)	Hirai (1)	22,529	9-16-0
26	May 5	@Giants	4 - 6	Walrond (2-2)	Tono (2-2)	Yamaguchi (1)	45,835	10-16-0
27	May 6	@Giants	3 - 2	Yamaguchi (4-0)	Sanada (0-1)		43,182	10-17-0
28	May 7	@Giants	7 - 3	Nishimura (2-0)	Yamaguchi (2-1)		40,139	10-18-0
29	May 8	Tigers	2 - 0	Miura (4-2)	Ando (2-2)		13,467	11-18-0
30	May 9	Tigers	4 - 0	Glynn (2-4)	Nomi (2-3)		23,464	12-18-0
31	May 10	Tigers	4 - 12	Fukuhara (2-2)	Kobayashi (1-2)		23,963	12-19-0
32	May 12	Giants	3 - 5	Takahashi (2-0)	Walrond (2-3)	Ochi (5)	19,691	12-20-0
33	May 13	Giants	9 - 8	Yamaguchi (3-1)	Toyoda (1-1)		20,412	13-20-0
34	May 14	Giants	5 - 9	Greisinger (5-2)	Fujie (0-1)		19,279	13-21-0
35	May 15	@Dragons	1 - 0 (10)	Yoshimi (3-2)	Ishii (0-4)		27,711	13-22-0
36	May 16	@Dragons	2 - 1 (10)	Iwase (1-1)	Yamaguchi (3-2)		32,869	13-23-0
37	May 17	@Dragons	4 - 1	Kawai (2-0)	Kobayashi (1-3)	Iwase (8)	33,935	13-24-0
38	May 19	@Marines	2 - 1	Karakawa (4-2)	Ishii (0-5)		16,387	13-25-0
39	May 20	@Marines	1 - 4	Walrond (3-3)	Naruse (2-2)	Yamaguchi (2)	17,019	14-25-0
40	May 22	@Lions	5 - 15	Miura (5-2)	Wakui (4-2)		16,323	15-25-0
41	May 23	@Lions	10 - 6	Hoashi (2-2)	Glynn (2-5)		24,471	15-26-0
42	May 24	Eagles	2 - 5	Hasebe (3-3)	Kobayashi (1-4)	Aoyama (1)	18,041	15-27-0
43	May 25	Eagles	6 - 5	Kudoh (1-1)	Aoyama (0-1)		18,696	16-27-0
44	May 27	Fighters	5 - 4	Kizuka (1-0)	Kikuchi (1-1)	Yamaguchi (3)	13,062	17-27-0
—	May 28	Fighters	Postponed (rained out)					
45	May 29	Fighters	1 - 7	Fujii (4-2)	Miura (5-3)		7,349	17-28-0
46	May 30	@Buffaloes	6 - 4	Kaneko (5-3)	Glynn (2-6)	Kato (8)	11,217	17-29-0
47	May 31	@Buffaloes	3 - 0	Hirano (2-1)	Kobayashi (1-5)		14,857	17-30-0

June

#	Date	Opponent	Score	Win	Loss	Save	Attendance	Record
48	June 2	@Hawks	7-3	Houlton (4-3)	Mastny (0-2)			17-31-0
49	June 3	@Hawks	3-0	Fujioka (1-0)	Walrond (3-4)	Mahara (10)		17-32-0
50	June 5	Lions	Postponed (rained out)					
51	June 6	Lions						
52	June 7	Marines						
53	June 8	Marines						
54	June 10	@Fighters						
55	June 11	@Fighters						
56	June 13	@Eagles						
57	June 14	@Eagles						
58	June 16	Buffaloes						
59	June 17	Buffaloes						
60	June 20	Hawks						
61	June 21	Hawks						
62	June 26	@Tigers						
63	June 27	@Tigers						
64	June 28	@Tigers						
65	June 30	Swallows						

July

#	Date	Opponent	Score	Win	Loss	Save	Attendance	Record
66	July 1	Swallows						
67	July 3	Carp						
68	July 4	Carp						
69	July 5	Carp						
70	July 7	@Giants						
71	July 8	@Giants						
72	July 9	@Giants						
73	July 10	@Swallows						
74	July 11	@Swallows						
75	July 12	@Swallows						
76	July 14	@ Carp						
77	July 15	@ Carp						
78	July 16	@ Carp						
79	July 17	Dragons						
80	July 18	Dragons						
81	July 19	Dragons						
82	July 20	Giants						
83	July 21	Giants						
84	July 22	Giants						
85	July 28	@Tigers						
86	July 29	@Tigers						
87	July 30	@Tigers						
88	July 31	@Carp						

== Player stats ==
=== Batting ===
Player	G	AB	H	Avg.	HR	RBI	SB

=== Pitching ===
Player	G	GS	IP	W	L	SV	ERA	SO
