= Hitoshi Fujie =

Japanese baseball player

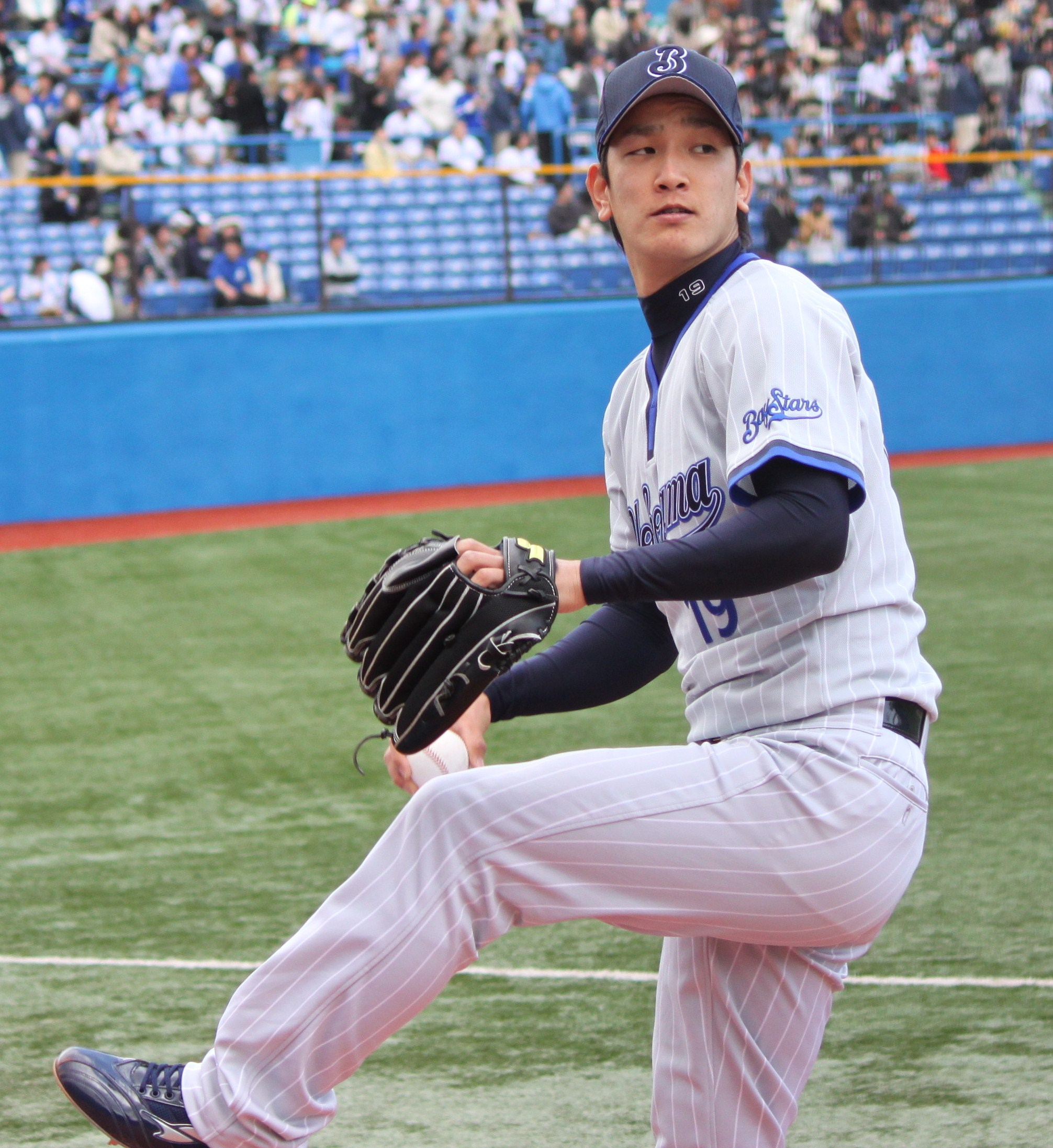
- Fujie with the Yokohama DeNA BayStars
- Pitcher
- Born: January 27, 1986 (age 40); Sakai, Osaka, Japan
- Bats: Right Throws: Right

debut
- May 7, 2009, for the Yokohama BayStars

NPB statistics (through 2015 season)
- Win–loss record: 12-14
- Earned run average: 4.17
- Strikeouts: 178
- Stats at Baseball Reference

Teams
- Yokohama BayStars/Yokohama DeNA BayStars (2009–2014); Tohoku Rakuten Golden Eagles (2015)

Hitoshi Fujie (藤江 均, Fujie Hitoshi; born January 27, 1986) is a Japanese former professional baseball player.
