= Kan Otake =

Japanese baseball player (born 1983)

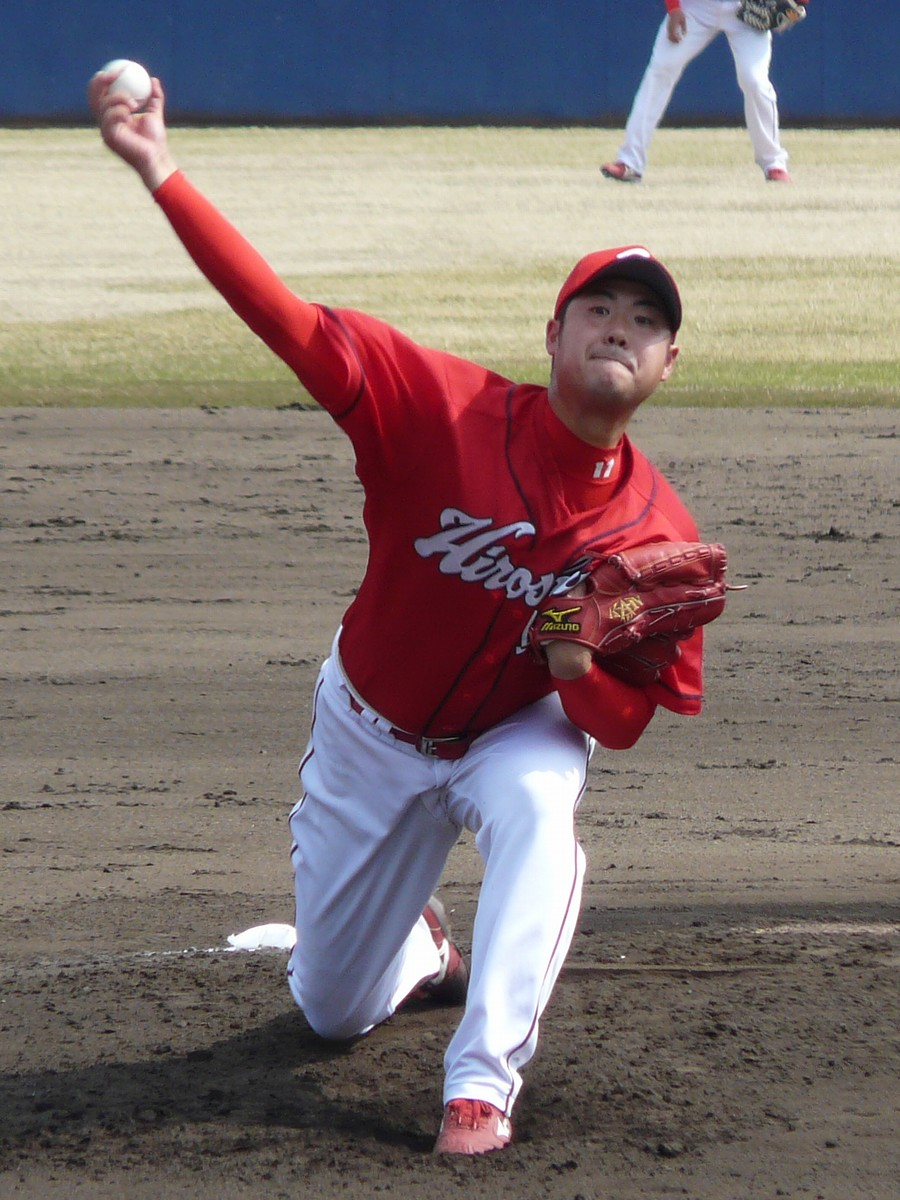
- Otake with the Hiroshima Toyo Carp

Yomiuri Giants – No. 108
- Pitcher / Coach
- Born: May 21, 1983 (age 42); Yashio, Saitama, Japan
- Batted: Right Threw: Right

NPB debut
- September 26, 2003, for the Hiroshima Toyo Carp

Last NPB appearance
- October 24, 2021, for the Yomiuri Giants

NPB statistics
- Win–loss record: 102-101
- Earned run average: 3.77
- Strikeouts: 1186
- Saves: 17
- Holds: 26
- Stats at Baseball Reference

Teams
- As player: Hiroshima Toyo Carp (2003–2013); Yomiuri Giants (2014–2021); As coach: Yomiuri Giants (2022-present)

Career highlights and awards
- Comeback Player of the Year (2012); 4× NPB All-Star (2008, 2009, 2012, 2013)
Medals
Men's baseball
Representing Japan
WBSC Premier12
Gold medal – first place	2019 Tokyo	Team

Kan Otake (大竹 寛, Ōtake Kan; born May 21, 1983) is a Japanese former professional baseball pitcher. He played in Nippon Professional Baseball (NPB) for 19 seasons for the Hiroshima Toyo Carp and Yomiuri Giants.

== Career ==
In 2001 NPB draft, Hiroshima Toyo Carp selected him in the first round.

Otake represented the Japan national baseball team at the 2000 World Junior Baseball Championship and 2019 WBSC Premier12.

On October 24, 2021, Otake announced his retirement from professional baseball. In 19 seasons in NPB for the Hiroshima Toyo Carp and Yomiuri Giants, Otake recorded a 102-101 record with a 3.77 ERA and 1,186 strikeouts in 376 total appearances.
