= Shunsuke Ishikawa =

Japanese baseball player

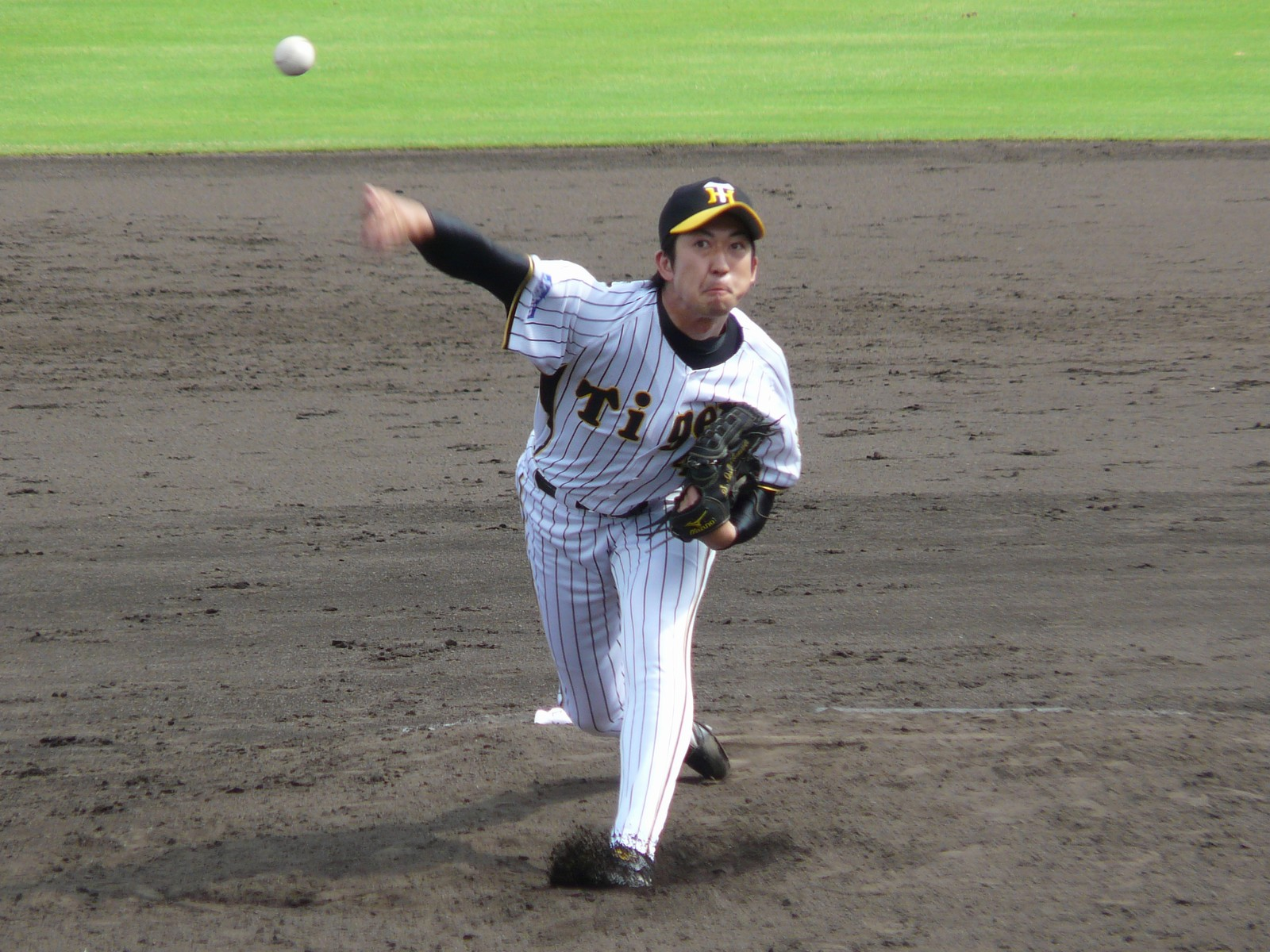
- Pitcher
- Born: August 12, 1985 (age 40); Tochigi, Japan
- Bats: Right Throws: Right

debut
- July 15, 2008, for the Hanshin Tigers

Teams
- Hanshin Tigers (2008 – 2012)

Shunsuke Ishikawa (石川 俊介, Ishikawa Shunsuke; born August 12, 1985, in Tochigi, Japan) is a Japanese Nippon Professional Baseball pitcher for the Hanshin Tigers in Japan's Central League.
