= Junpei Shinoda =

Japanese baseball player

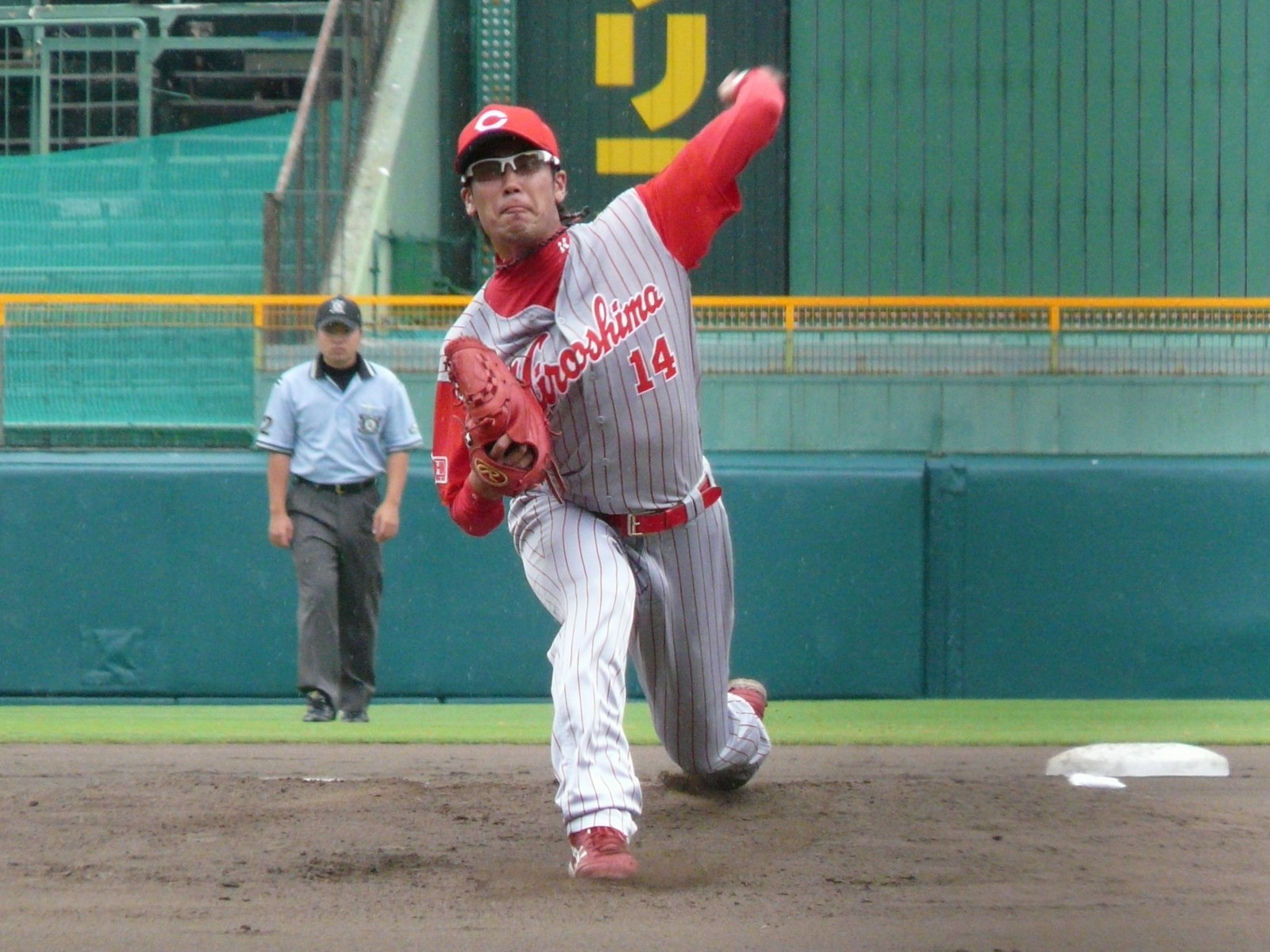
- Shinoda with the Hiroshima Toyo Carp
- Pitcher
- Born: April 20, 1985 (age 41); Yokohama, Japan ,
- Bats: Left Throws: Left

debut
- May 5, 2008, for the Hiroshima Toyo Carp

Teams
- Hiroshima Toyo Carp (2008 – 2015)

Junpei Shinoda (篠田 純平, Shinoda Junpei; born April 20, 1985) is a Japanese Nippon Professional Baseball player. A pitcher, he is currently with the Hiroshima Toyo Carp in Japan's Central League.
