= Ryuji Yokoyama =

Japanese baseball player

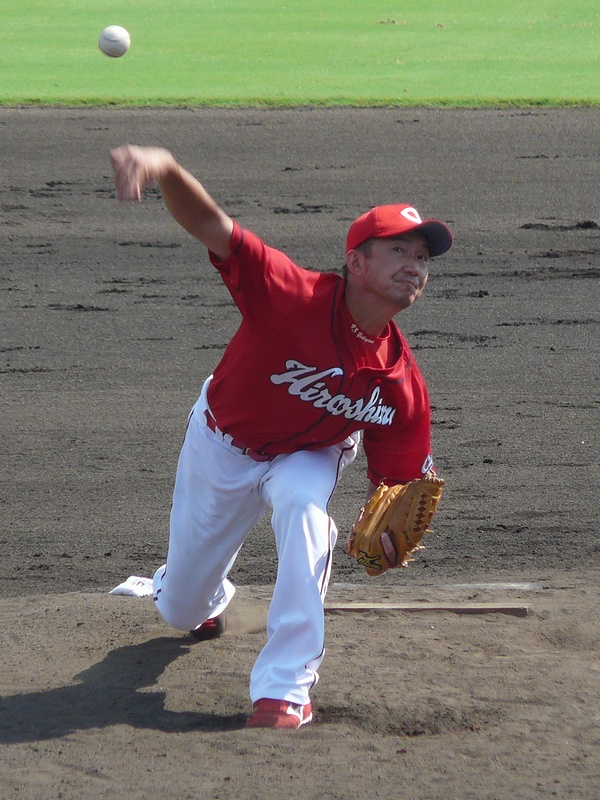
- Pitcher / Coach
- Born: June 11, 1976 (age 49); Katsuyama, Fukui, Japan
- Batted: Right Threw: Right

NPB debut
- April 13, 1997, for the Hiroshima Toyo Carp

Last NPB appearance
- August 24, 2014, for the Hiroshima Toyo Carp

NPB statistics
- Win–loss record: 46–44
- Saves: 17
- ERA: 3.42
- Strikeouts: 692
- Holds: 110
- Stats at Baseball Reference

Teams
- As player: Hiroshima Toyo Carp (1995–2014); As coach: Hiroshima Toyo Carp (2020–2025)

Ryuji Yokoyama (横山 竜士, Yokoyama Ryuji; born June 11, 1976 in Katsuyama, Fukui, Japan) is a professional Japanese baseball player. He plays pitcher for the Hiroshima Toyo Carp.
