= Daisuke Miura =

Japanese baseball player (born 1973)

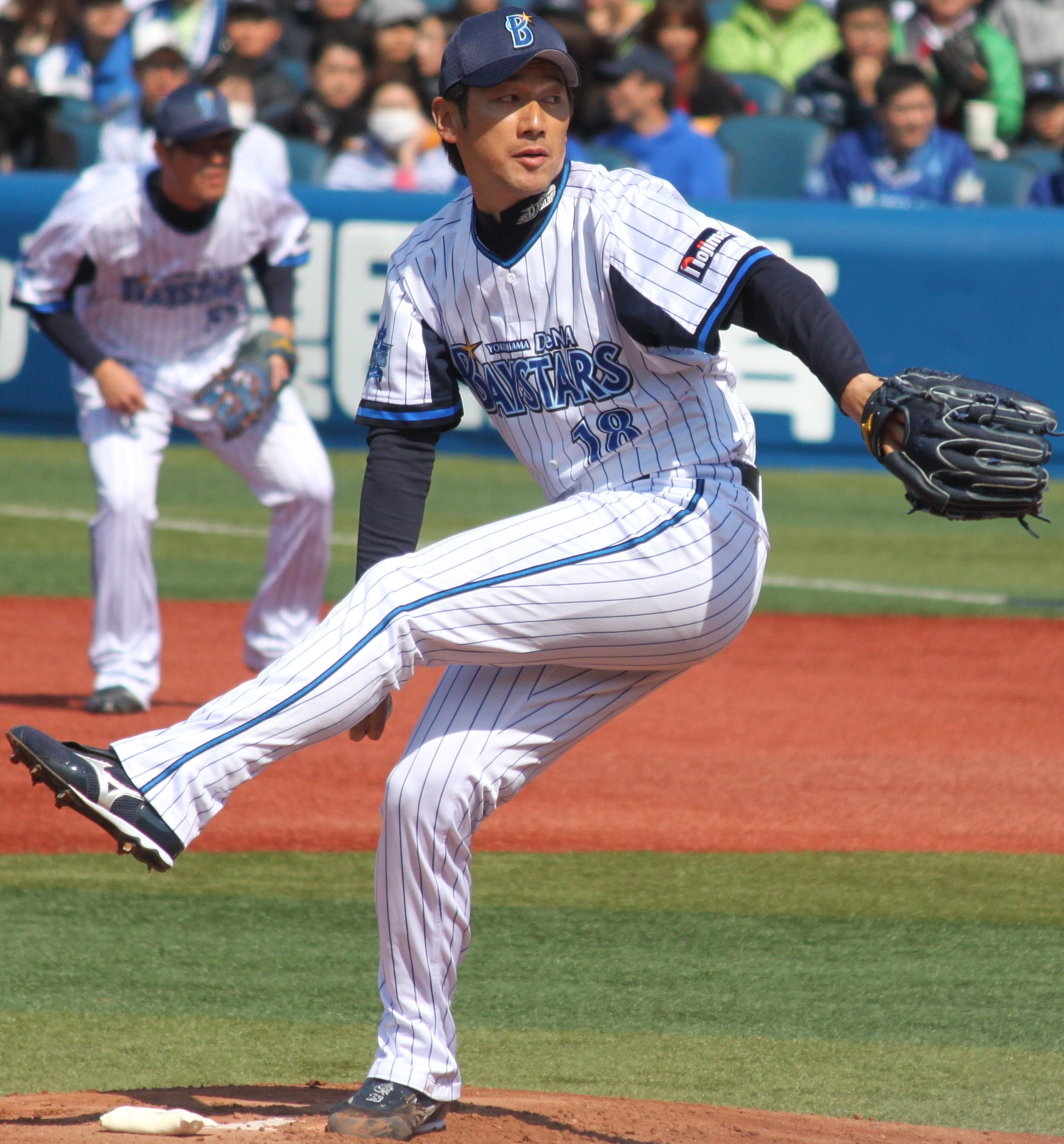
- Miura with the Yokohama DeNA BayStars
- Pitcher / Manager / Coach
- Born: December 25, 1973 (age 52); Nara, Japan
- Batted: Right Threw: Right

NPB debut
- October 7, 1992, for the Yokohama Taiyo Whales

Last NPB appearance
- 2016, for the Yokohama DeNA BayStars

NPB statistics
- Win–loss record: 172–184
- Earned run average: 3.60
- Strikeouts: 2481
- Stats at Baseball Reference

Teams
- As player: Yokohama Taiyo Whales/Yokohama BayStars/Yokohama DeNA BayStars (1992–2016); As manager: Yokohama DeNA BayStars (2021–2025); As coach: Yokohama DeNA BayStars (2014–2016, 2019–2020)

Career highlights and awards
- As player: Japan Series champion (1998); As manager: Matsutaro Shoriki Award (2024); Japan Series champion (2024)
Medals
Men's baseball
Representing Japan
Olympic Games
Bronze medal – third place	Athens 2004	Team competition

Daisuke Miura (三浦 大輔; born December 25, 1973) is a Japanese former professional baseball pitcher and coach. He played in Nippon Professional Baseball (NPB) for the Yokohama DeNA BayStars from 1992 to 2016. He served as a coach for the team in two separate stints from 2014 to 2020 before being hired to become manager for the BayStars in 2021. In five seasons from 2021 to 2025, he led the team to the Climax Series four times, with the 2024 team reaching and winning the Japan Series for the first time in 26 years.

== Playing career ==
=== Yokohama DeNa BayStars ===
Miura was drafted 6th in the 1991 Nippon Professional Baseball draft by the Yokohama Taiyo Whales. He made his professional debut against the Yomiuri Giants on October 7, 1992, retiring six straight batters in relief.

In 2005, he led the Central League in strikeouts (177) and ERA (2.52). Miura became a free agent after an injury-plagued 2008 season. Both the BayStars and the Hanshin Tigers, the team that he had rooted for as a child, offered him contracts. Miura decided to return to the BayStars, who offered him a 4-year contract worth 1 billion yen (approximately US$10 million), as opposed to the Tigers, who were offering three years and 900 million yen. Miura's contract was renewed for the 2014 season at 180 million Yen (approximately US$1.75 million).

Miura is known for his success against the Tigers in his career. Even in his worst seasons, Miura has had some of his best games against the Tigers, particularly at Koshien Stadium.

His nickname is "Hama no Banchō". This means "Boss of [Yoko]hama".

=== Olympic career ===
Miura pitched for Japan in the 2004 Summer Olympics, and helped the team win a bronze medal.

== Coaching career ==
In 2019, the Yokohama DeNA BayStars hired Miura as pitching coach.

In 2020, Miura was hired as the Manager of the Yokohama DeNA BayStars minor league team.

In 2021, Miura became manager of the BayStars' main team, replacing Alex Ramírez. On October 20, 2025, Miura stepped down from his position.

== Pitching style ==
Miura throws a fastball in the high 80s and also utilizes a slider, forkball, shuuto, curveball, and cutter. He is known for working both sides of the plate.

== Titles ==
- Best ERA: (2005)
- Most strikeouts: (2005)
- Highest winning percentage: (1997)

== Awards ==
- Monthly MVP: (August 2000, August 2005, July 2007, August 2014)
- Outstanding MEP Award: 1 time (2005)
- Golden Spirit Award (2007)
- Speed Up Award: (2009, 2014)
- Spirit Award: (2014 8th)
- All-Star Game Outstanding Player Award: (2002 Game 1, 2006 Game 1)
- All-Star Game Best Pitcher Award: (2009 Game 1)
- All-Star Game Award: (2006 Game 1)
- Central League Association Special Achievement Award: (2016)
- Best Proud Father Award in "Professional Baseball Division" (2013)
- Yokohama Culture Award (2017)

== Records ==
- First appearance: October 7, 1992, 26th game against the Yomiuri Giants (Yokohama Stadium), third reliever from the top of the 7th inning, two scoreless innings[118]
- First strikeout: Same as above, from Kazunori Shinozuka in the top of the 8th inning[119]
- First start: August 1, 1993, 17th game against the Hiroshima Toyo Carp (Hiroshima Municipal Stadium), 2 runs allowed in 5 innings[120]
- First win/complete game victory: September 4, 1993, 21st game against Hiroshima Toyo Carp (Kitakyushu Municipal Stadium), 1 run allowed in 9 innings[121]
- First shutout victory: April 22, 1994, 1st game against Hiroshima Toyo Carp (Yokohama Stadium)[122]
- First home run: October 2, 1999, 26th game against Chunichi Dragons (Yokohama Stadium), from Kenshin Kawakami

== Milestone records ==
- 1000 innings pitched: September 10, 2000, 24th game against Hiroshima Toyo Carp (Yokohama Stadium), hit a fly ball to right field with two outs in the top of the first inning off Akihiro Higashide (284th player in history)
- 1000 strikeouts: June 6, 2002, 8th game against Yakult Swallows (Yokohama Stadium), hit a fly ball to right field with two outs in the top of the second inning off Yataro Sakamoto.(109th player in history)
- 1500 innings pitched: June 19, 2004, 13th game against Chunichi Dragons (Nagoya Dome), struck out Alex Ochoa with one out in the bottom of the second inning .(152nd player in history
- 100 wins: May 9, 2006, 1st game against Tohoku Rakuten Golden Eagles (Yokohama Stadium), started and gave up 2 runs in 8 innings. (119th player in history)
- 1,500 strikeouts: June 18, 2006, 6th game against Seibu Lions (Invoice Seibu Dome), off Kazuhiro Wada in the bottom of the 6th inning (47th player in history)
- 2,000 innings pitched: March 30, 2007, 1st game against Yomiuri Giants (Yokohama Stadium), achieved by hitting Makoto Kosaka with a grounder to the pitcher with one out in the top of the 6th inning (82nd player in history)
- 2,500 innings pitched: September 21, 2009, 22nd game against Hanshin Tigers (Yokohama Stadium), achieved by hitting Ando Yuya with a foul fly to the catcher with two outs in the top of the 2nd inning (44th player in history)
- 2,000 strikeouts: October 3, 2009, 24th game against Chunichi Dragons (Yokohama Stadium), achieved by Donoue Takehiro in the top of the 4th inning (19th player in history)
- 150 losses: June 17, 2012, 4th game against Fukuoka SoftBank Hawks (Fukuoka Dome), pitched a complete game loss with 1 run allowed in 8 innings (27th player in history)
- 150 wins: July 4, 2012, 7th game against Yomiuri Giants (Yokohama Stadium), 3 runs allowed in 7 innings, 6 strikeouts (47th player in history)
- 3,000 innings pitched: July 24, 2013, 13th game against Chunichi Dragons (Nagoya Dome), hit a foul fly to first base with two outs in the bottom of the 5th inning (27th player in history)
- 500 games pitched: October 5, 2013, starting pitcher in the 24th game against Chunichi Dragons (Nagoya Dome), gave up 3 runs in 9 innings, resulting in a no-win (0 earned runs) (91st player in history)

== Other records ==
- Consecutive season wins: 23 years (1993 - 2015) (Tied NPB record)
- Consecutive seasons with hits: 24 years (1993-2016) (4th in NPB history [123])
- Consecutive seasons with wild pitches: 16 years (1997-2015) (Tied NPB recor)?
- Consecutive seasons with double-digit starting pitchers: 21 years (1995-2015) {1st in NPB history}
- 3 wins in the opening 3 games: 2015 (Oldest NPB record)*
- Franchise player: Played for the same team for 25 years from debut to retirement
- All-Star Game appearances: 6 times (2002, 2004, 2006, 2009, 2012, 2013)

== Uniform number ==
- 46 (1992-1997)
- 18 (1998-2016, /2019- 2020)
    - 17 (2004 Athens Olympics)
- 81 (2021-)

Source：Nippon Professional Baseball
