= Tsuyoshi Shimoyanagi =

Japanese baseball player (born 1968)

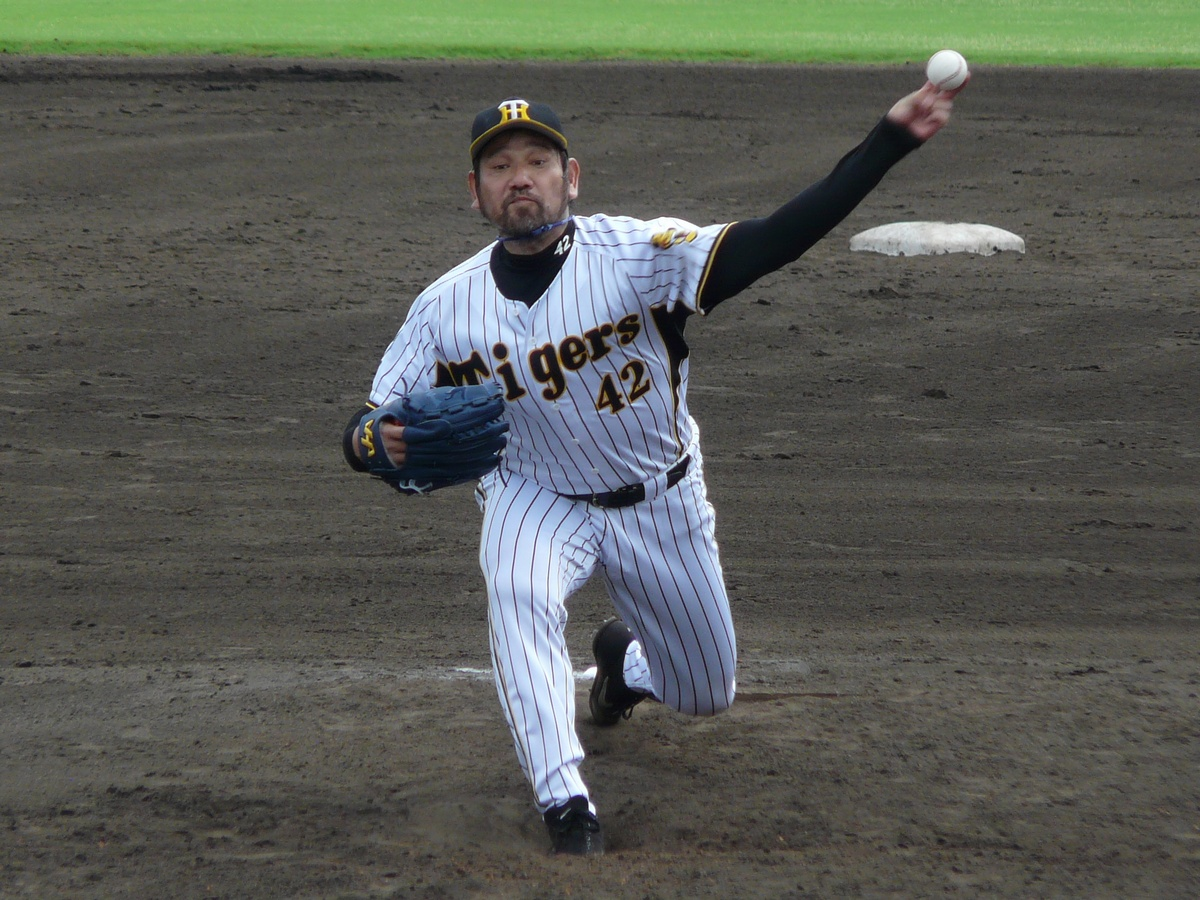
- Pitcher
- Born: May 16, 1968 (age 57); Nagasaki, Japan
- Bats: Left Throws: Left

debut
- August 9, 1991, for the Fukuoka Daiei Hawks

NPB statistics
- Win–loss record: 129-106
- Earned run average: 3.92
- Strikeouts: 1,418

Teams
- Fukuoka Daiei Hawks (1991–1995); Nippon-Ham Fighters (1996–2002); Hanshin Tigers (2003–2011); Tohoku Rakuten Golden Eagles (2012)

Tsuyoshi Shimoyanagi (下柳 剛, Shimoyanagi Tsuyoshi; born May 16, 1968 in Nagasaki, Japan) is a Japanese former professional baseball pitcher. He played in Nippon Professional Baseball (NPB) for the Fukuoka Daiei Hawks, Hokkaido Nippon-Ham Fighters, Hanshin Tigers, and Tohoku Rakuten Golden Eagles.
