= Hayato Terahara =

Japanese baseball player (born 1983)

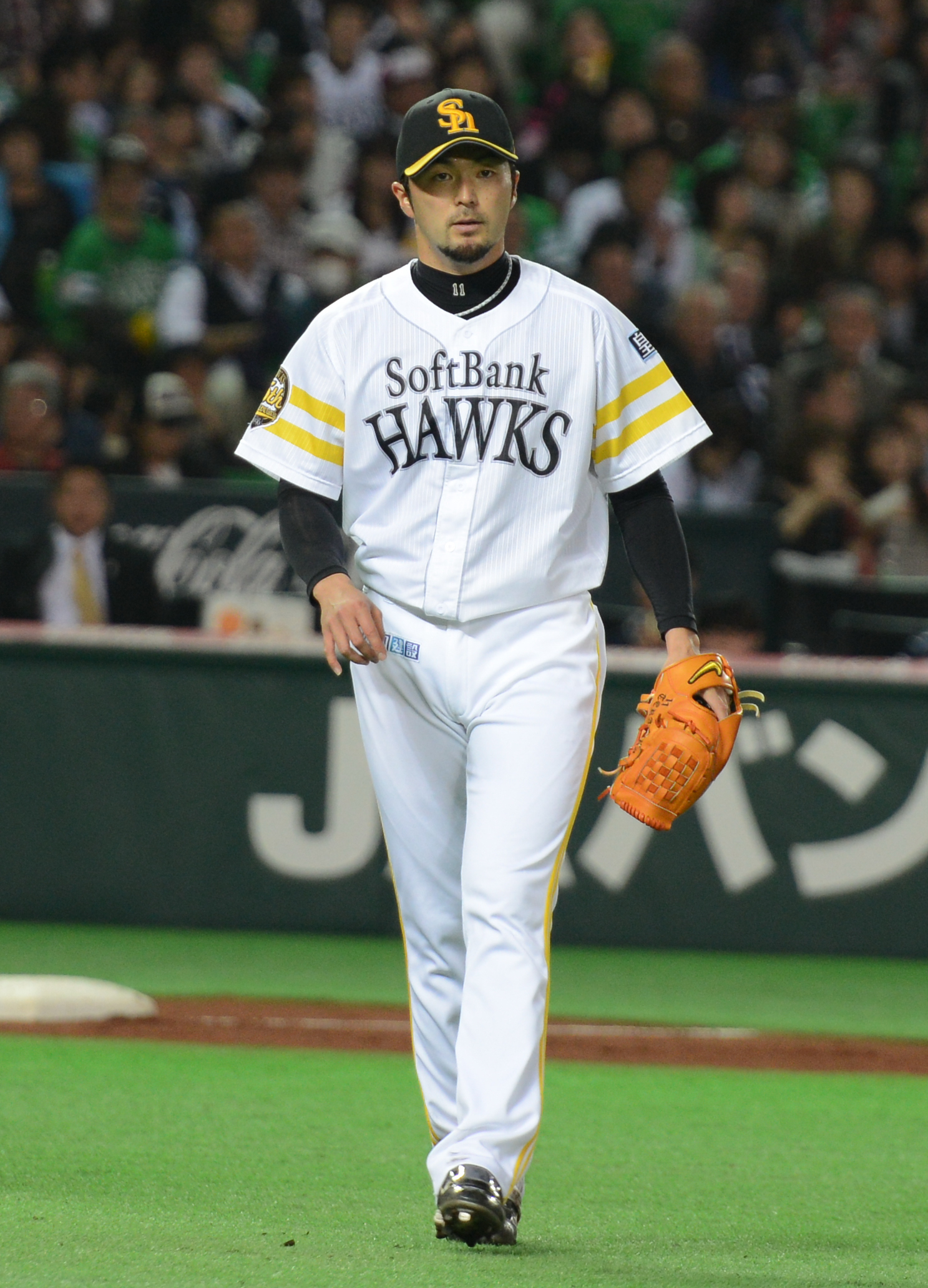
- Terahara with the Fukuoka SoftBank Hawks.

Fukuoka SoftBank Hawks – No. 76
- Pitcher / Coach
- Born: October 9, 1983 (age 42); Miyazaki, Miyazaki, Japan
- Batted: Right Threw: Right

NPB debut
- April 16, 2002, for the Fukuoka Daiei Hawks

Last NPB appearance
- July 3, 2019, for the Tokyo Yakult Swallows

NPB statistics
- Win–loss record: 73–83
- Earned run average: 3.88
- Strikeouts: 861
- Stats at Baseball Reference

Teams
- As player: Fukuoka Daiei Hawks/Fukuoka SoftBank Hawks (2002–2006); Yokohama BayStars (2007–2010); Orix Buffaloes (2011–2012); Fukuoka SoftBank Hawks (2013–2018); Tokyo Yakult Swallows (2019); As coach: Ryukyu BLUE OCEANS (2020–2021); Fukuoka Kitakyushu Phoenix (2022); Fukuoka SoftBank Hawks (2023–present)

Career highlights and awards
- As player: 2× NPB All-Star Game (2008,2011); 4× Japan Series Champion (2003, 2015, 2017, 2018); As coach: Japan Series champion (2025)

Hayato Terahara (寺原 隼人, Terahara Hayato; born October 9, 1983) is a Japanese former professional baseball pitcher, and current second squad pitching coach for the Fukuoka SoftBank Hawks of Nippon Professional Baseball (NPB). He played in NPB for the Hawks, Yokohama BayStars, Orix Buffaloes, and the Tokyo Yakult Swallows.

== Early baseball career ==
Terahara played for Nichinan Gakuen High School and participated the 83rd Japanese High School Baseball Championship in the summer of his junior year. In the second round against Tamano Konan High School, he pitched a 158 km/h fastball, the fastest in high school history. This record is still the fastest record as of 2023.

== Professional career ==
=== Fukuoka Daiei / SoftBank Hawks ===
On November 19, 2001, Terahara was drafted as the first round pick by the Fukuoka Daiei Hawks in the 2001 Nippon Professional Baseball draft.

In Terahara's rookie year, he pitched in seven games as a starting pitcher and had a record of 6-2 win–loss record and a one save.

He pitched 18 games in the 2003 season, posting a record of 7 wins and 5 losses, but his performance gradually declined.

Terahara pitched in 56 games in five seasons with the Hawks, posting a 16–14 win–loss record and a one save.

=== Yokohama BayStars ===
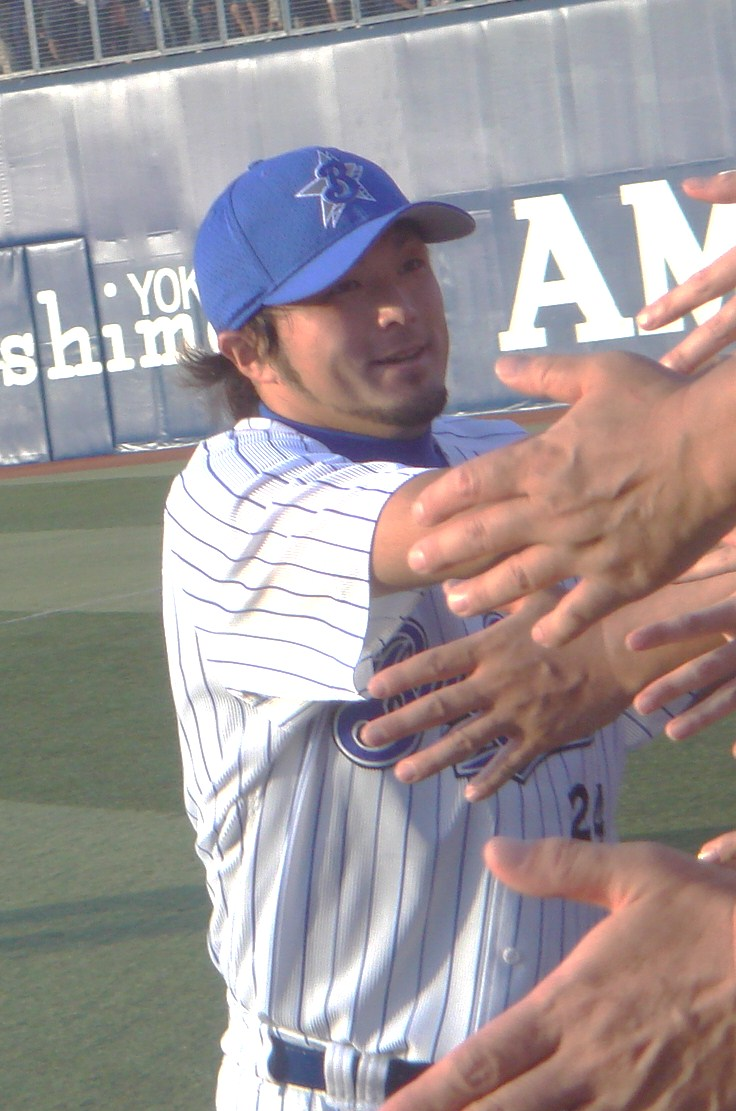
Terahara with the Yokohama BayStars.

On December 12, 2006, Terahara was traded to the Yokohama BayStars exchange to Hitoshi Tamura.

In 2007 season, Terahara finished the regular season with a 27 Games pitched, a 12–12 Win–loss record, a 3.36 ERA, a 163 strikeouts in 184.2 innings.

In the 2008 season, he pitched as the team's closer, recorded with a 41 Games pitched, a 3–9 Win–loss record, a one hold, a 25 saves, a 3.30 ERA, a 66 strikeouts in 71 innings. And he participated the All-Star Game for the first time in Mazda All-Star Game 2008.

Terahara pitched in 101 games in four seasons with the BayStars, posting a 21–31 win–loss record, a one hold, and a 22 saves.

=== Orix Buffaloes ===
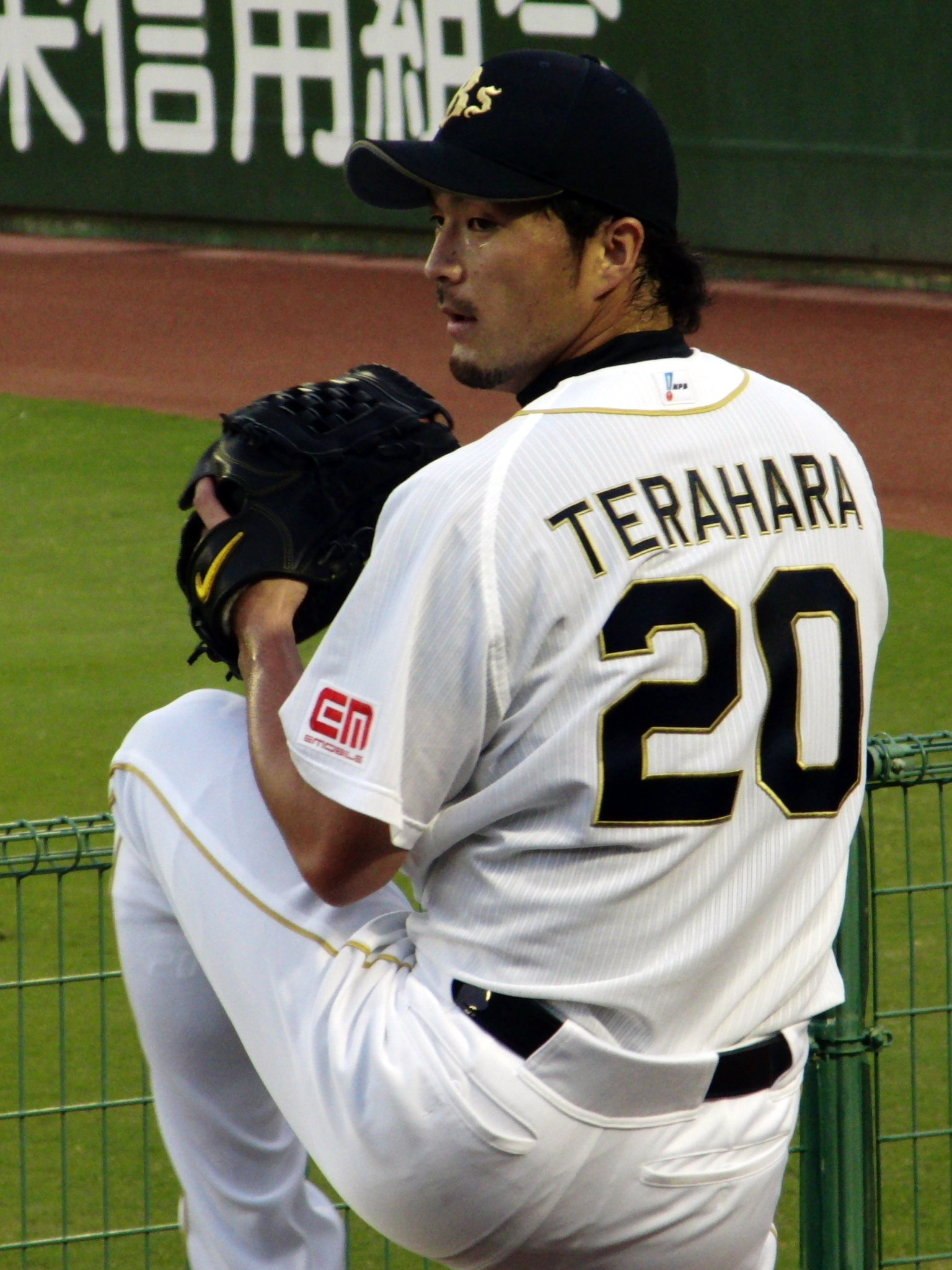
Terahara with the Orix Buffaloes.

On December 6, 2010, Terahara and Kazuya Takamiya was traded to the Orix Buffaloes exchange to Shogo Yamamoto and Go Kida.

In 2011 season, Terahara finished the regular season with a 25 Games pitched, a 12–10 Win–loss record, a 3.06 ERA, a 112 strikeouts in 170.1 innings. And he participated the All-Star Game for the second time in Mazda All-Star Game 2011.

In 2012 season, Terahara finished the regular season with a 16 Games pitched, a 6–8 Win–loss record, a 3.92 ERA, a 61 strikeouts in 101 innings.

He decided to exercise his free agent rights during the off-season.

=== Fukuoka SoftBank Hawks (second stint) ===
On December 4, 2012, Terahara signed with the Fukuoka SoftBank Hawks and return to the Hawks for the first time in six seasons.

On April 2, 2014, Terahara achieved his 1,000 innings in a game against the Hokkaido Nippon-Ham Fighters. He was also the winning pitcher in the game against Tohoku Rakuten Golden Eagles on April 16, setting a record for winning against 13 teams, including all 12 NPB teams and the defunct the Osaka Kintetsu Buffaloes.

After returning to the Hawks for six seasons, he was plagued by frequent injuries, including surgery on his right knee, but pitched in 101 games, a 16–17 Win–loss record, a 9 holds, a 186 strikeouts in 286.1 innings.

=== Tokyo Yakult Swallows ===
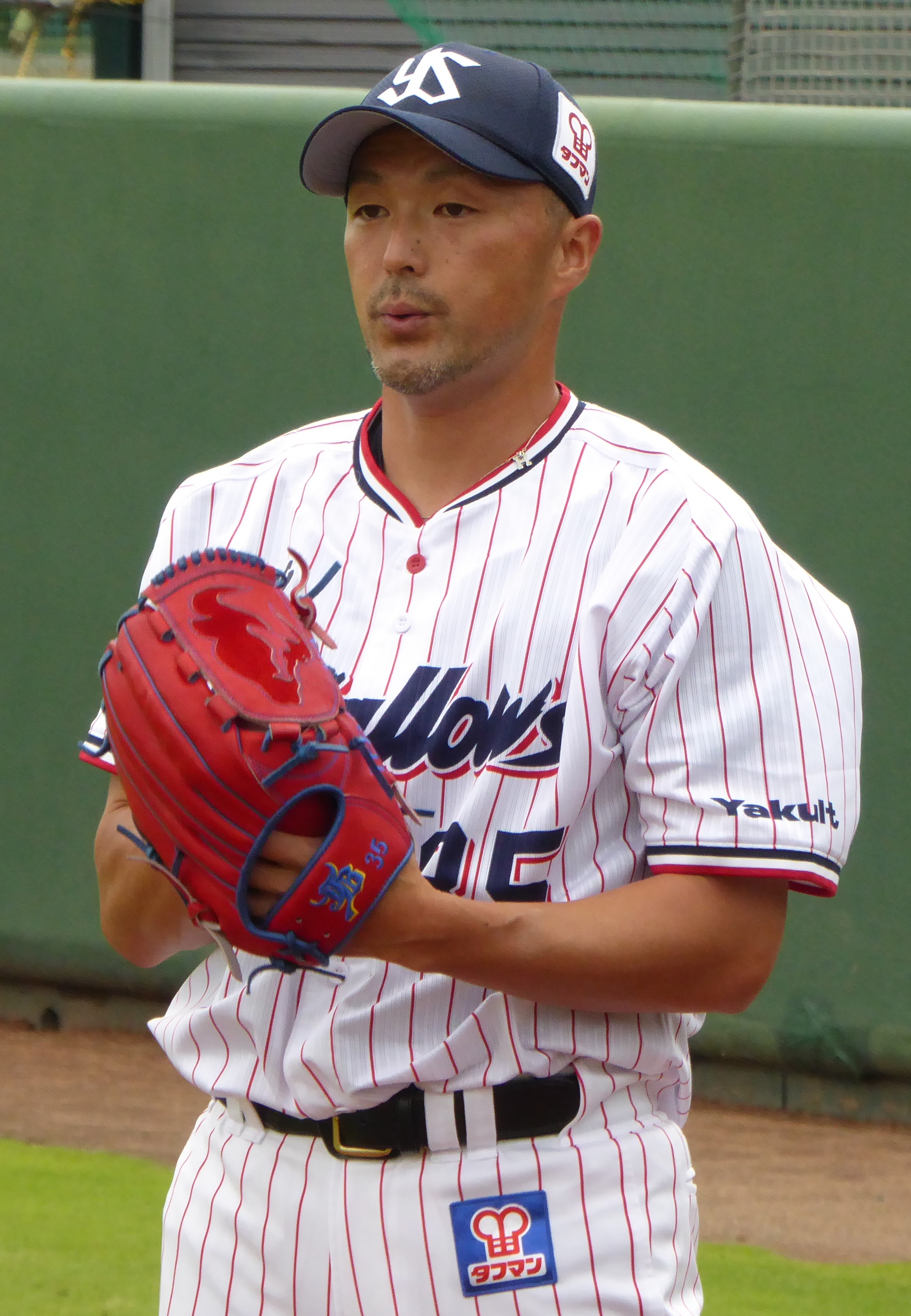
Terahara with the Tokyo Yakult Swallows.

On December 10, 2018, Terahara signed with the Tokyo Yakult Swallows.

In 2019 season, he pitched only four games.

On September 17, 2019, Terahara announced his retirement.

Terahara pitched in 303 games in 18 seasons overall, compiling with a 73–81 win–loss record, a 12 holds, a 23 saves, and a 3.88 ERA.

== Post-playing career ==
On December 30, 2019, Terahara was appointed as Ryukyu BLUE OCEANS pitching coach.

On October 21, 2021, Terahara was appointed as Fukuoka Kitakyushu Phoenix pitching coach.

On October 31, 2022, The Fukuoka SoftBank Hawks announced that Terahara will take over as pitching coach from the 2023 season

On December 2, 2023, he was transferred to the second squad pitching coach.
