= Ryan Glynn =

American baseball player

- Pitcher
- Born: November 1, 1974 (age 51); Portsmouth, Virginia, U.S.
- Batted: Right Threw: Right

Professional debut
- MLB: May 16, 1999, for the Texas Rangers
- NPB: May 21, 2006, for the Tohoku Rakuten Golden Eagles
- CPBL: May 19, 2011, for the Uni-President 7-Eleven Lions

Last appearance
- MLB: July 26, 2005, for the Oakland Athletics
- NPB: September 23, 2009, for the Yokohama BayStars
- CPBL: August 13, 2011, for the Uni-President 7-Eleven Lions

MLB statistics
- Win–loss record: 9–20
- Earned run average: 6.24
- Strikeouts: 116

KBO statistics
- Win–loss record: 1–3
- Earned run average: 5.18
- Strikeouts: 28

NPB statistics
- Win–loss record: 26–44
- Earned run average: 3.62
- Strikeouts: 400

CPBL statistics
- Win–loss record: 6–1
- Earned run average: 1.47
- Strikeouts: 60
- Stats at Baseball Reference

Teams
- Texas Rangers (1999–2001); Samsung Lions (2003); Toronto Blue Jays (2004); Oakland Athletics (2005); Tohoku Rakuten Golden Eagles (2006); Hokkaido Nippon-Ham Fighters (2007–2008); Yokohama BayStars (2009); Uni-President 7-Eleven Lions (2011)

Career highlights and awards
- NPB: Interleague play MVP (2007); CPBL: Taiwan Series champion (2011)

Ryan David Glynn (born November 1, 1974) is an American former professional baseball pitcher who played in Major League Baseball for the Texas Rangers, Toronto Blue Jays, and Oakland Athletics.

== College and MLB career ==
Glynn attended college at the Virginia Military Institute until he was drafted in 1995 by the Texas Rangers in the fourth round. He played parts of five seasons in the majors between 1999 and 2005 for the Texas Rangers, Toronto Blue Jays, and Oakland Athletics.

== NPB and CPBL career ==
In 2006, Glynn pitched for the Tohoku Rakuten Golden Eagles and had a 3.96 ERA. In 2007, he signed with the Hokkaido Nippon-Ham Fighters and had a 2.21 ERA. Despite having a 3.64 ERA in 2008, Glynn received little run support and finished with a 7–14 record. On January 7, 2009, he signed a one-year deal with the Yokohama BayStars.

Glynn pitched for the CPBL's Uni-President 7-Eleven lions in 2011. The Lions won the CPBL Championship, and Glynn pitched in the 2011 Asia Series.
