= Teruaki Yoshikawa =

Japanese baseball player

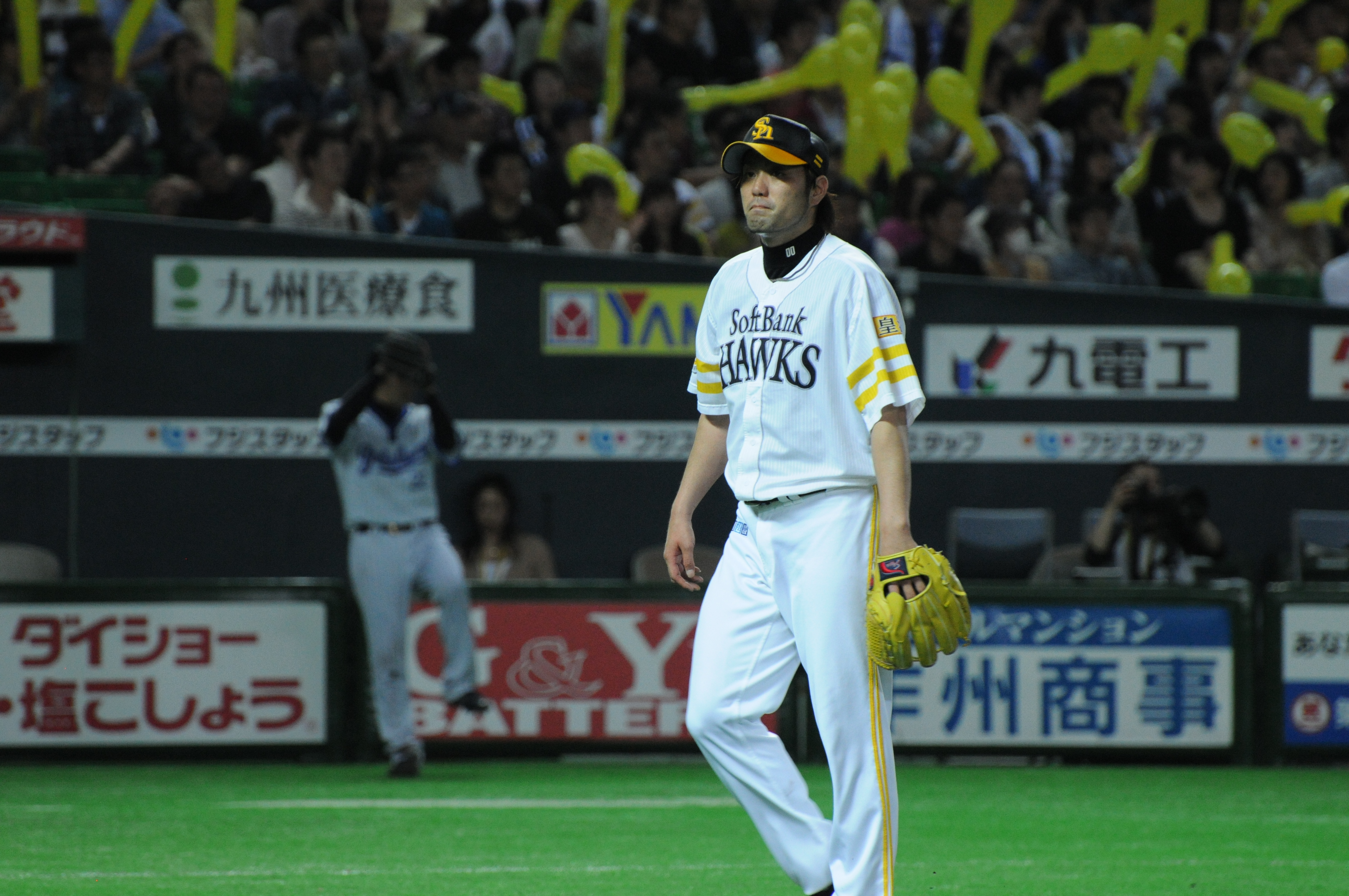
- Pitcher
- Born: November 13, 1981 (age 43)
- Batted: Right Threw: Right

NPB debut
- April 7, 2004, for the Yokohama BayStars

Last appearance
- August 30, 2013, for the Yokohama DeNA BayStars

NPB statistics (through 2013)
- Win–loss record: 3–9
- Earned run average: 5.97
- Strikeouts: 141
- Saves: 0
- Holds: 9

Teams
- Yokohama BayStars/Yokohama DeNA BayStars (2004–2009, 2013); Fukuoka SoftBank Hawks (2010–2012)

Teruaki Yoshikawa (吉川 輝昭, born November 13, 1981) is a Japanese former professional baseball pitcher in Japan's Nippon Professional Baseball. He previously played for the Yokohama BayStars from 2004 to 2009 and again in 2013 and with the Fukuoka SoftBank Hawks from 2010 to 2012.
