= Les Walrond =

American baseball player (born 1976)

- Pitcher
- Born: November 7, 1976 (age 49); Muskogee, Oklahoma, U.S.
- Batted: Left Threw: Left

Professional debut
- MLB: June 8, 2003, for the Kansas City Royals
- KBO: 2005, for the LG Twins
- NPB: 2009, for the Yokohama BayStars

Last appearance
- MLB: September 28, 2008, for the Philadelphia Phillies
- KBO: 2010, for the Doosan Bears
- NPB: 2009, for the Yokohama BayStars

MLB statistics
- Win–loss record: 1–4
- Earned run average: 7.07
- Strikeouts: 39
- Stats at Baseball Reference

Teams
- Kansas City Royals (2003); LG Twins (2005); Chicago Cubs (2006); Philadelphia Phillies (2008); Yokohama BayStars (2009); Doosan Bears (2010)

Leslie Dale Walrond (born November 7, 1976) is an American former professional baseball player and current scout for the Los Angeles Dodgers of Major League Baseball.

He is a former left-handed pitcher whose active career extended from 1998 to 2012. The native of Muskogee, Oklahoma, appeared in 23 Major League games pitched, 21 in relief, for the Kansas City Royals (2003), Chicago Cubs (2006) and Philadelphia Phillies (2008). He appeared in 21 games as a starting pitcher in Nippon Professional Baseball in 2009. He stood 6 feet 3 inches (1.91 m) tall and weighed 205 pounds (93 kg).

During his freshman and sophomore years in high school, Walrond played baseball at Booker T. Washington High School (Tulsa, Oklahoma) under the tutelage of Coach Corey Slagle. With Walrond anchoring the baseball team, Booker T. experienced an athletic renaissance that included New York Giants defensive back R. W. McQuarters and Washington Wizards center Etan Thomas. He graduated from Union High School in Tulsa and attended the University of Kansas.

== Career ==
Walrond made his Major League debut on June 8, 2003, while he was with the Kansas City Royals against the Colorado Rockies as a relief pitcher.

He was signed as a free agent on January 11, 2006, by the Chicago Cubs and played for their Triple-A affiliate, the Iowa Cubs in 2007. On May 2, 2008, Walrond signed as a free agent with the Philadelphia Phillies. He was called up from the Phillies' Triple-A affiliate, the Lehigh Valley IronPigs, on August 1, 2008, then sent back down on August 20, following the activation of Pedro Feliz from the disabled list. He was claimed off waivers by the Toronto Blue Jays on November 4, 2008, but waived on November 20. In December, he signed with the Yokohama BayStars of Japan's Central League.

In 2011, Walrond paid for his own airline ticket to the Mets spring training camp where he was signed to a minor league contract. Les pitched well during the Big League Camp, but became ill before the break of camp. Unfortunately, Les was waived by the Mets. On April 15, 2011, Les signed a deal with the Lancaster Barnstormers of the Atlantic League.

On May 26, 2011, Walrond signed a minor league deal and was assigned to Double-A Reading two days later. On July 16, 2012, the Toronto Blue Jays announced they signed Walrond to a minor league contract.

Walrond's final season, 2012, was split between independent league baseball and Double-A, where he hurled for the New Hampshire Fisher Cats.

Walrond spent 2014–15 as a professional scout for the Boston Red Sox and joined the Dodgers for the 2016 season.
