= Shinobu Fukuhara =

Japanese baseball player

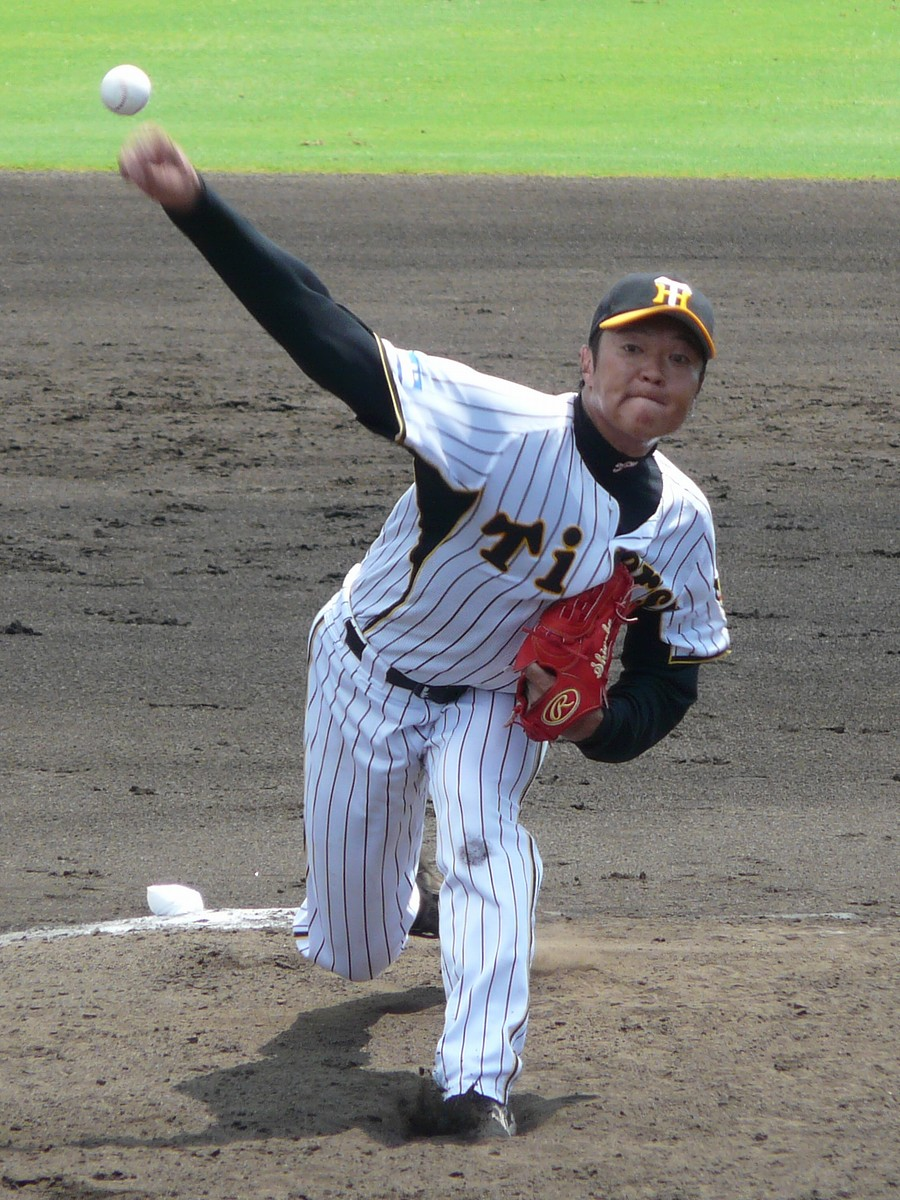
- Fukuhara with the Hanshin Tigers
- Pitcher / Coach
- Born: December 28, 1976 (age 48); Miyoshi, Hiroshima, Japan
- Batted: Right Threw: Right

NPB debut
- April 2, 1999, for the Hanshin Tigers

Last appearance
- October 1, 2016, for the Hanshin Tigers

NPB statistics (through 2016 season)
- Win–loss: 83-104
- ERA: 3.49
- Strikeouts: 1081
- Saves: 29
- Holds: 118

Teams
- As player: Hanshin Tigers (1999–2016); As coach: Hanshin Tigers (2017–2024)

Career highlights and awards
- 2× Central League Middle Reliever of the Year (2014, 2015)
- Last updated on: 3 February 2025

Shinobu Fukuhara (福原 忍, Fukuhara Shinobu; born December 28, 1976, in Miyoshi, Hiroshima, Japan) is a retired Japanese baseball pitcher for the Hanshin Tigers. He was the number three draft pick for the Hanshin Tigers in 1999.

In 2014 and 2015, he was a 2x Central League Middle Reliever.
