= Yuya Ando =

Japanese baseball player (born 1977)

Yuya Ando 安藤 優也
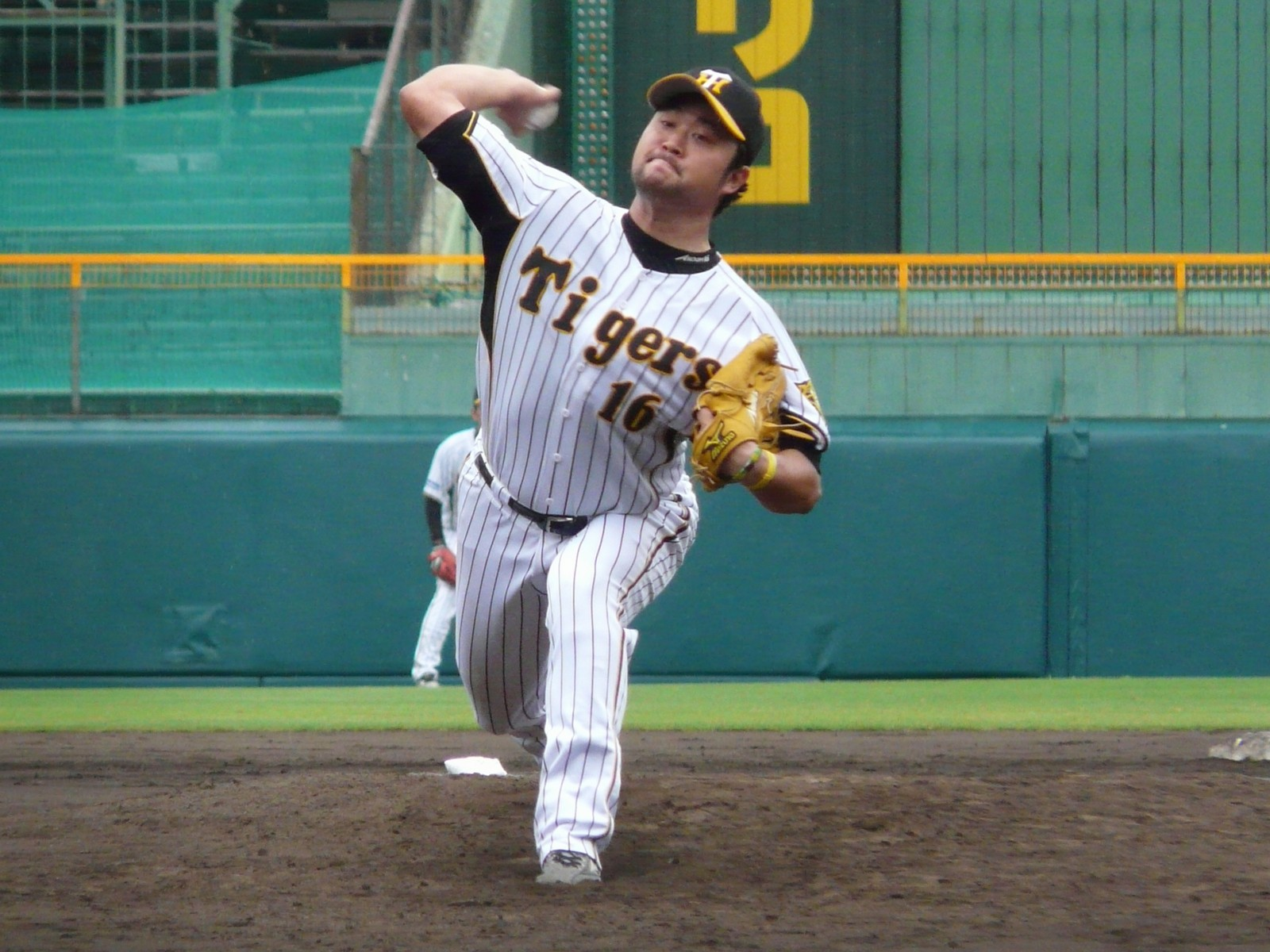
- Ando with the Hanshin Tigers

Hanshin Tigers – No. 86
- Pitcher / Coach
- Born: December 27, 1977 (age 48); Oita, Japan
- Bats: Right Throws: Right

NPB debut
- April 7, 2002, for the Hanshin Tigers

NPB statistics (through 2017 season)
- Win–loss record: 77-66
- ERA: 3.56
- Strikeouts: 822
- Holds: 76
- Saves: 11
- Stats at Baseball Reference

Teams
- As player: Hanshin Tigers (2002 – 2017); As coach: Hanshin Tigers (2018 – present)

Olympic medal record

Men's baseball
Bronze medal – third place	Athens 2004	Team competition

Yūya Andō (安藤 優也, Andō Yūya; often Andoh, born December 27, 1977) is a professional baseball player from Ōita City, Japan. He is part of the starting rotation for the Hanshin Tigers baseball team.

== Career ==
In 2006, Ando pitched his first Shutout game against Yokohama BayStars.

Ando joined the Japanese Olympic baseball team for the 2004 Summer Olympics, and won a bronze medal. Ando went 7-4 in college, battling shoulder problems. He went on to Toyota Motors in the industrial leagues and peaked at 93 mph there, drawing the interest of various scouts. In the 2001 Baseball World Cup, he went 2-0 with a 2.45 ERA, allowing 5 hits and fanning 14 in 11 innings.
