= Yuki Saito (pitcher, born 1987) =

Japanese baseball player

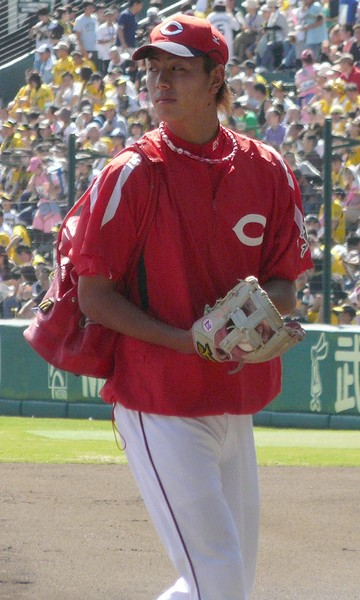
- Pitcher
- Born: June 20, 1987 (age 38); Eiheiji, Fukui, Japan
- Batted: Left Threw: Left

NPB debut
- October 1, 2006, for the Hiroshima Toyo Carp

Last NPB appearance
- July 27, 2012, for the Hiroshima Toyo Carp

NPB statistics
- Win–loss record: 19–23
- Earned run average: 4.46
- Strikeouts: 167
- Stats at Baseball Reference

Teams
- Hiroshima Toyo Carp (2006–2010, 2012)

Yuki Saito (齊藤 悠葵, Saitō Yūki; born June 20, 1987) is a former professional baseball pitcher who played in Nippon Professional Baseball for the Hiroshima Toyo Carp. He was chosen by the Carp in the third round of the 2005 high school draft. Saito is 1.86 m (6 ft 1 in) and weighs 76 kg (168 lb).

== Career statistics (NPB) ==
Year	Age	Team	Lg	W	L	SV	G	CG	SHO	IP	H	R	ER	HR	BB	SO	HBP	ERA	WHIP
2006	18	Hiroshima	CL	1	0	0	2	0	0	10.1	6	1	1	1	2	7	0	0.87	0.77
2007	19	Hiroshima	CL	0	1	0	2	0	0	1.2	2	1	1	0	1	1	0	5.40	1.80
2008	20	Hiroshima	CL	3	1	0	6	0	0	32.1	21	13	12	4	16	26	1	3.34	1.14
Career				4	2	0	10	0	0	44.1	29	15	14	5	19	34	1	2.84	1.08
