= Scott Atchison =

American baseball player (born 1976)

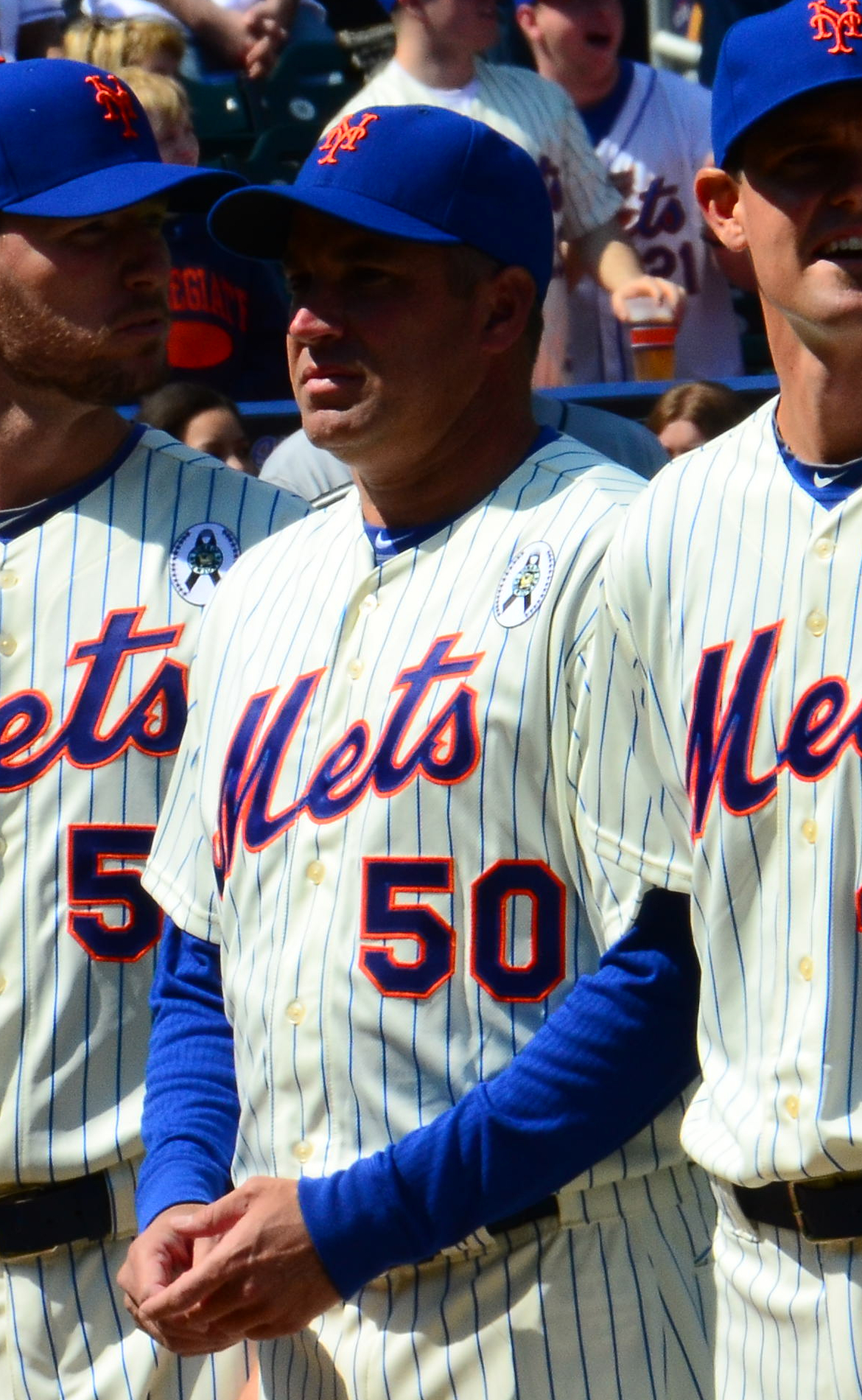
- Atchison (center) with the Mets in 2013
- Pitcher
- Born: March 29, 1976 (age 50); Denton, Texas, U.S.
- Batted: Right Threw: Right

Professional debut
- MLB: July 31, 2004, for the Seattle Mariners
- NPB: 2008, for the Hanshin Tigers

Last appearance
- NPB: 2009, for the Hanshin Tigers
- MLB: June 22, 2015, for the Cleveland Indians

MLB statistics
- Win–loss record: 17–11
- Earned run average: 3.63
- Strikeouts: 253

NPB statistics
- Win–loss record: 12–9
- Earned run average: 2.77
- Strikeouts: 166
- Stats at Baseball Reference

Teams
- As player: Seattle Mariners (2004–2005); San Francisco Giants (2007); Hanshin Tigers (2008–2009); Boston Red Sox (2010–2012); New York Mets (2013); Cleveland Indians (2014–2015); As coach: Cleveland Indians (2018–2019)

Scott Barham Atchison (born March 29, 1976) is an American former professional baseball pitcher. He played in Major League Baseball (MLB) for the Seattle Mariners, San Francisco Giants, Boston Red Sox, New York Mets, and Cleveland Indians between 2004 and 2015. He also played in Nippon Professional Baseball (NPB) for the Hanshin Tigers and later served as the bullpen coach for the Indians for the 2018 and 2019 seasons.

== Amateur career ==
Atchison graduated from McCullough High School in The Woodlands, Texas. He was originally drafted by the Seattle Mariners in the 36th round of the 1994 amateur draft but chose to attend Texas Christian University, where he received his degree in general studies. In 1996, he played collegiate summer baseball with the Wareham Gatemen of the Cape Cod Baseball League.

== Professional career ==
=== Seattle Mariners ===
Atchison was drafted again by the Mariners in the 49th round of the 1998 amateur draft and signed with the team in May 1999. He spent five years playing for minor league affiliates of the Mariners and made his debut in the Majors on July 31, 2004. He spent the 2004 and 2005 seasons splitting his time between the Mariners and the Mariners' minor league affiliates, appearing in 31 games over two years. In 2006, he played the entire season in the minors.

=== San Francisco Giants ===
In 2007, he signed with the San Francisco Giants and appeared in 22 games. At the end of the season, he refused an assignment from the Giants to the Fresno Grizzlies and became a free agent.

=== Hanshin Tigers ===
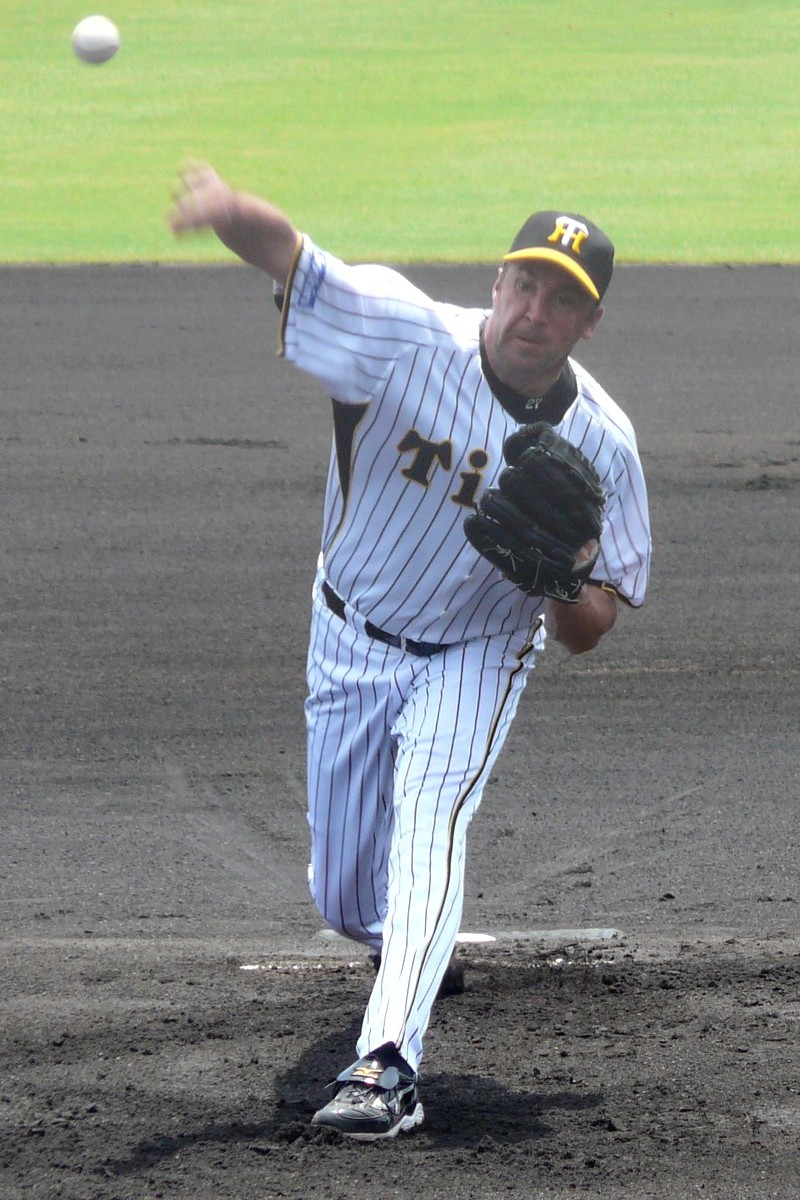
Atchison pitching for the Hanshin Tigers in 2008

He signed a minor league contract with the Boston Red Sox on December 7, 2007, and sold his contract to the NPB's Hanshin Tigers later that month. In two seasons in NPB, Atchison was 12–9 with a 2.77 ERA.

=== Boston Red Sox ===
On December 7, 2009, Atchison signed a one-year, incentive laden contract with the Red Sox. Atchison was recalled by the Red Sox on May 5, 2011. On May 20, 2011, Atchison notched his 1st ever career save against the Cubs. On July 15, 2012, the Red Sox placed him on the 15-day disabled list, retroactive to the previous day, because of a forearm strain in his right elbow. On August 16 he was transferred to the 60-day disabled list to make roster space for newly acquired pitcher, Pedro Beato. Atchison returned to the active roster on September 12. On November 30, Atchison was non-tendered and became a free agent.

=== New York Mets ===
On January 29, 2013, Atchison signed a minor league contract with the New York Mets. On June 18, Atchison was activated from the disabled list to help out the bullpen. He became a free agent on December 2, after being non-tendered.

=== Cleveland Indians ===
Atchison signed a minor league deal with the Cleveland Indians on January 6, 2014. He signed a one-year extension with a team option on August 19. With the Indians in 2014, Atchison finished 6–0 with a 2.75 ERA. He pitched in 70 games.

Atchison was designated for assignment on June 23, 2015. He was released by the Indians on June 28, 2015.

=== Minnesota Twins ===
On July 4, 2015, Atchison signed a minor league contract with the Minnesota Twins. He was released on July 15, having requested a release after not being promoted to the majors.

== Coaching career ==
After serving for two years as the Cleveland Indians' advance scout coordinator, Atchison was hired by the Indians as their bullpen coach on November 2, 2017. He was fired by Cleveland on October 2, 2019.

== Pitching style ==
Atchison threw a four-seam fastball in the 90-94 mph range, a slider in the mid-high 80's, and a curveball in the high 70's. On very rare occasions, a changeup to left-handed hitters.

== Personal life ==
Atchison is married. Their daughter was born on October 23, 2007 with TAR syndrome.

Sporting positions
| Preceded by Jason Bere | Cleveland Indians bullpen coach 2018 – 2019 | Succeeded by Brian Sweeney |
