= Hirotaka Egusa =

Japanese baseball player

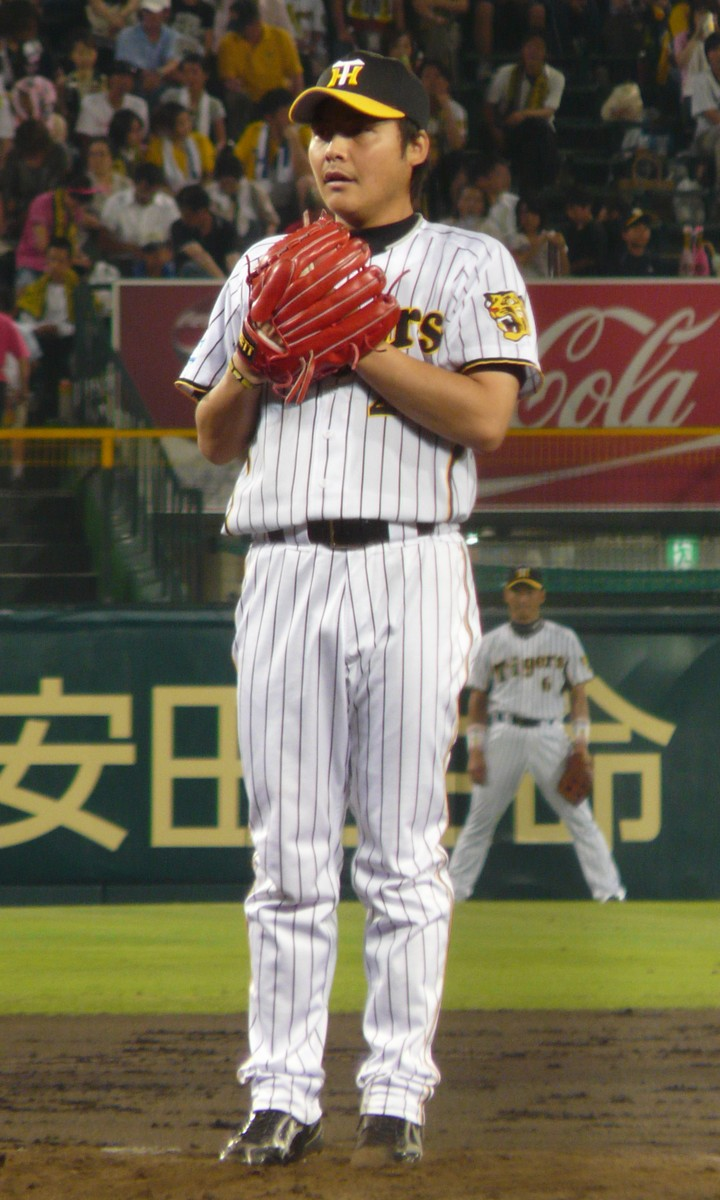
- Egusa with the Hanshin Tigers

Hanshin Tigers – No. 72
- Pitcher / Coach
- Born: September 3, 1980 (age 45); Fukuyama, Hiroshima, Japan
- Batted: Left Threw: Left

NPB debut
- September 21, 2003, for the Hanshin Tigers

Last NPB appearance
- August 4, 2016, for the Hiroshima Toyo Carp

NPB statistics (through 2017 season)
- Win–loss record: 22-17
- ERA: 3.15
- Strikeouts: 433
- Holds: 48
- Saves: 0
- Stats at Baseball Reference

Teams
- As player: Hanshin Tigers (2003–2011); Saitama Seibu Lions (2011); Hiroshima Toyo Carp (2012–2017); As coach: Hanshin Tigers (2022–present)

Hirotaka Egusa (江草 仁貴, Egusa Hirotaka; born September 3, 1980) is a Japanese Nippon Professional Baseball pitcher.

His wife is a former Japanese volleyball player Yoshie Takeshita.
