= Katsuhiro Nagakawa =

Japanese baseball player and coach

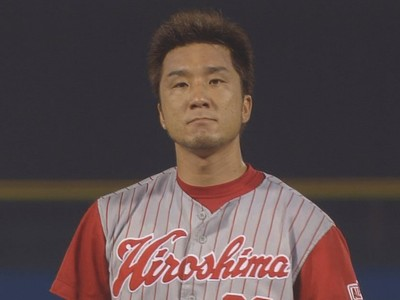
- Nagakawa with the Hiroshima Toyo Carp

Hiroshima Toyo Carp – No. 74
- Pitcher / Coach
- Born: December 14, 1980 (age 45); Miyoshi, Hiroshima, Japan
- Batted: Right Threw: Right

NPB debut
- March 29, 2003, for the Hiroshima Toyo Carp

Last NPB appearance
- September 23, 2019, for the Hiroshima Toyo Carp

NPB statistics (through 2019 season)
- Win–loss record: 38–42
- Earned run average: 3.46
- Strikeouts: 605
- Saves: 165
- Holds: 79
- Stats at Baseball Reference

Teams
- As player: Hiroshima Toyo Carp (2003–2019); As coach: Hiroshima Toyo Carp (2020–present)

Katsuhiro Nagakawa (永川 勝浩, Nagakawa Katsuhiro; born December 14, 1980) is a former Nippon Professional Baseball pitcher for the Hiroshima Toyo Carp in Japan's Central League.
