= Yuya Ishii (baseball) =

Japanese baseball player

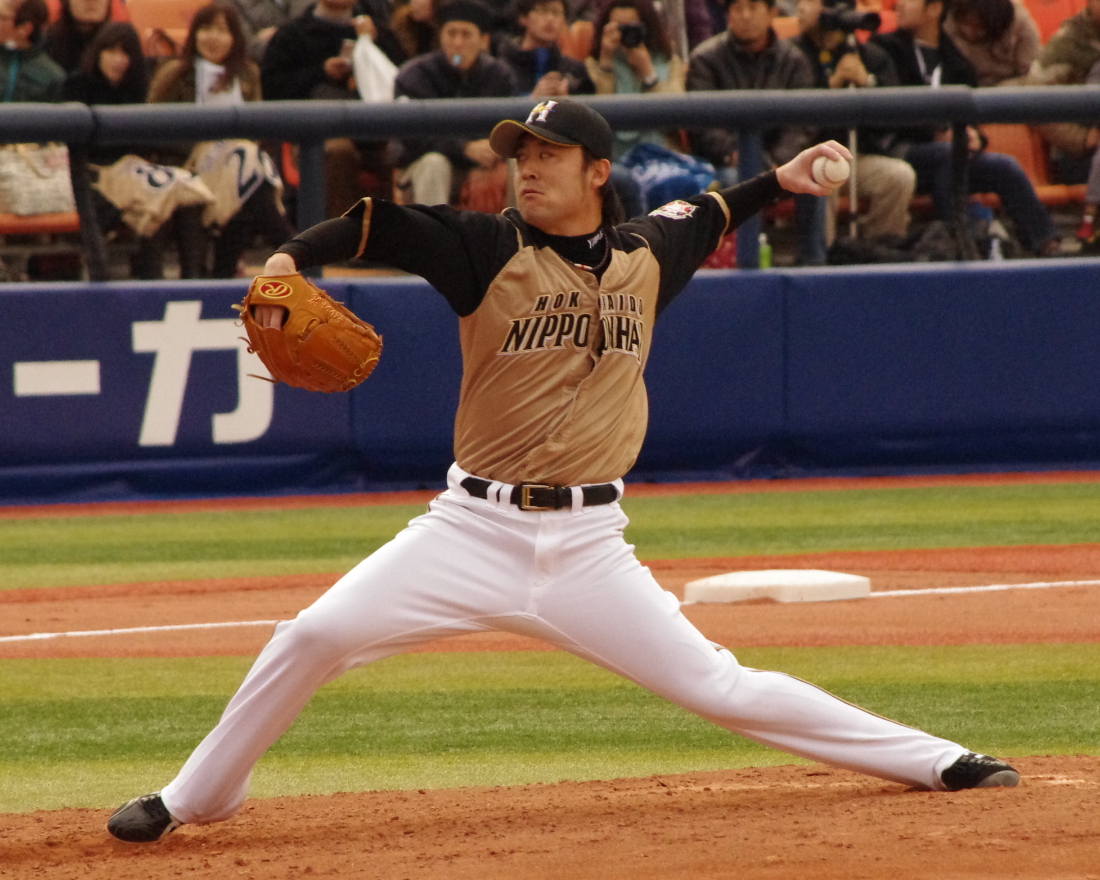
- Ishii with the Hokkaido Nippon-Ham Fighters
- Pitcher
- Born: July 4, 1981 (age 44); Yokohama, Japan
- Bats: Left Throws: Left

NPB debut
- April 13, 2005, for the Chunichi Dragons

NPB statistics
- Win–loss record: 19–19
- Earned run average: 3.05
- Strikeouts: 258

Teams
- Chunichi Dragons (2005–2008); Yokohama BayStars (2008–2010); Hokkaido Nippon-Ham Fighters (2010–2018)

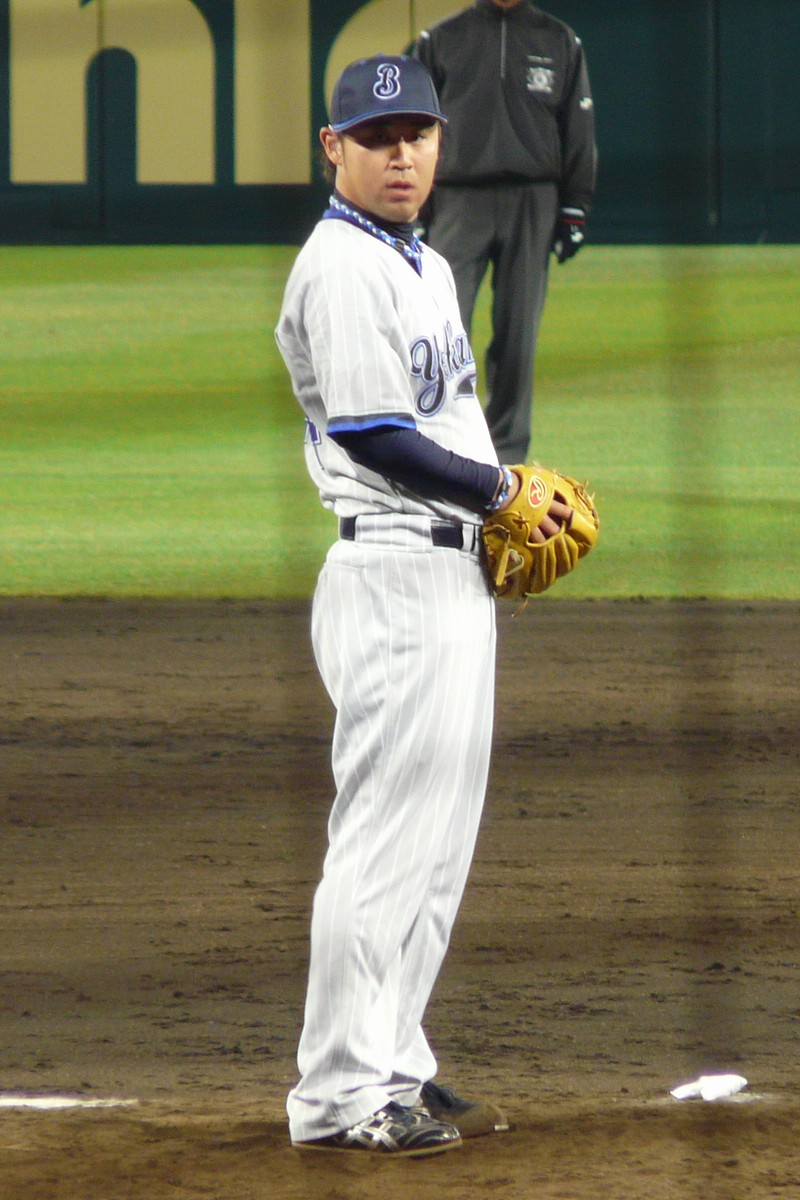
Ishii pitching for the Yokohama BayStars in 2009.

Yuya Ishii (石井 裕也, Ishii Yūya; born July 7, 1981) is a Japanese former professional baseball pitcher who played in Nippon Professional Baseball pitcher for the Hokkaido Nippon-Ham Fighters, Yokohama BayStars and Chunichi Dragons.

== Career ==
=== Before turning pro ===
Although he had a congenital hearing loss, he joined his older brother's youth baseball team in the second grade and began playing baseball. When he began playing both outfielder and pitcher in the fifth grade, he had poor control of his pitches. He was a fan of the Oyo Whales and their successor team, the Yokohama BayStars, since childhood and was a member of the Friendship Club.

He went on to Yokohama Shoko High School. In the summer of his junior year at Yokohama Shoko High School, he pitched five games in the Kanagawa Prefecture Tournament, striking out 37 batters and making it to the top eight. He was also a candidate for the 1999 professional baseball draft, but was not selected. Muneo Nakata, the scouting director of the Chunichi Dragons, later said, "I had my eye on him since high school, but because of his handicap, I waited to see how he would do until he came of age.
