= Atsushi Nomi =

Japanese baseball player

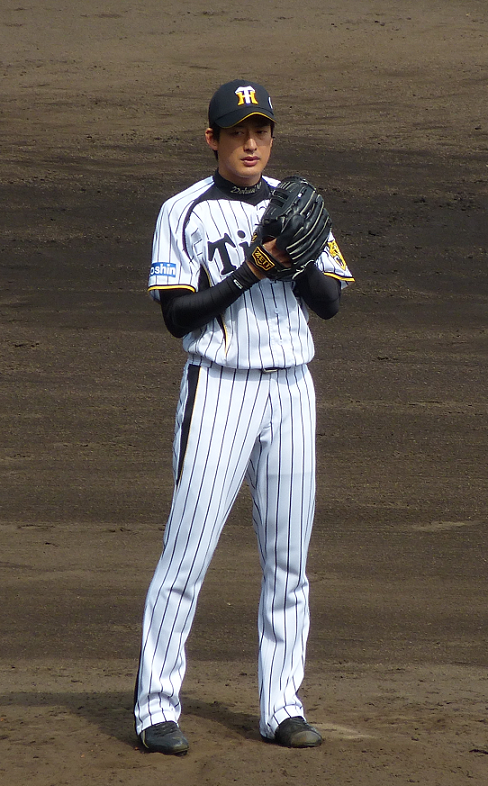
- Nomi with the Hanshin Tigers
- Pitcher / Coach
- Born: May 28, 1979 (age 46); Izushi, Izushi District (present: Toyooka), Hyōgo, Japan
- Batted: Left Threw: Left

NPB debut
- April 3, 2005, for the Hanshin Tigers

Last NPB appearance
- September 30, 2022, for the Orix Buffaloes

NPB statistics
- Win–loss record: 104-93
- Earned run average: 3.35
- Strikeouts: 1,517
- Holds: 57
- Saves: 4
- Stats at Baseball Reference

Teams
- As player: Hanshin Tigers (2005–2020); Orix Buffaloes (2021–2022); As coach: Orix Buffaloes (2021–2022)

Career highlights and awards
- 2× NPB All-Star selection (2012, 2013); Central League strikeout champion (2012); Japan Series champion (2022)

Atsushi Nomi (能見 篤史, Nōmi Atsushi; born May 28, 1979) is a former Japanese professional baseball pitcher. He played for the Hanshin Tigers in the Central League for most of his career. He ended his career as a player-coach for the Orix Buffaloes of the Pacific League.

== Early baseball career ==
Nōmi attended Tottori Jōhoku High School. In his 3rd year, he pitched a perfect game during the Spring Prefecture Tournament. Along with Komoya Tamaguchi and Kei Igawa, they were called the "left-handed high-school trio."

Upon graduation, he joined Osaka Gas where he continued to play as pitcher in the industrial league. Due to injuries and underperformance, he rarely appeared in the team's games and was nicknamed "the phantom pitcher" by zealous Osaka Gas fans. After almost five years, his appearances gradually increased. During the November 2003 non-pro baseball tournament, Nōmi delivered a solid performance in championship game with Nissan Co. However, Osaka Gas lost after Yuuki Itou drove in the winning run in the 11th inning. In 2004, together with soon-to-be teammates Ryo Watanabe and Yasutomo Kubo, Nōmi played for the national team in the 22nd Haarlem Baseball Week where Japan finished 3rd.

== Professional career ==
=== Hanshin Tigers ===
He was selected by the Hanshin Tigers during the 2004 NPB draft.

2005

In 16 appearances, Nōmi registered a 5.57 ERA and a 1.624 WHIP, allowing 78 hits while striking out 64 for a 4–1 win–loss record.

2007

With ace Kei Igawa leaving for Major League Baseball, Hanshin was faced with a shortage of starting pitchers. Nōmi was then given a shot to start several games until the end of April, but he produced a 1–3 record in 5 games, and was reassigned as a reliever. He continued to display a lack of stability on the mound, and after he gave up 5 runs in 1 inning in a May 5 game against the Lotte, he was once again sent to ni-gun. Nōmi returned in August where he won 3 starts, including a complete game, but he suffered a setback on September 11 by surrendered 7 runs in 4 innings. He had 2 more starts after that, but he ended the season in ichi-gun with a 4–4 record.

Nōmi fared better in his ni-gun games, where he won 6 of his 7 starts (2nd highest in the league) with an ERA of 2.51.

2008

Nōmi only had one start for the season (May 7 vs. the Giants) and worked as a reliever for 10 more games. He spent most of the year playing in ni-gun and recorded 5 wins and 11 saves in 29 games with a 0.83 ERA and 0.90 WHIP.

2009

This year was a breakout year for Nōmi as he made his way back to the Tigers' starting rotation. Despite his reliability on the mound, he couldn't record a win during his starts early in the season due in part to a lack of run support. After earning a loss in a July 4 game against the Swallows where he gave up 4 runs in the 5th inning, Nōmi was demoted to relief in his next 3 appearances. He managed to rebound in his start against the Giants on July 19, where he pitched 9 innings with only 2 hits surrendered and 12 strikeouts, which earned him his first win of the season.

Nōmi went on a streak in his next 11 starts, recording 9 more victories. He finished the season 13–9 and placed 9th in the league in innings pitched (165), 4th in ERA (2.62), and 2nd in strikeouts (154). In addition, he won 4 consecutive starts against Giants pitcher Tetsuya Utsumi and recorded the lowest ERA of 1.45 against the Hiroshima Carp (4 wins in 7 starts).

2010

Nōmi fractured his right foot on May 2 while baserunning and was taken off the roster. He underwent rehab for several months and returned on September 9, where he pitched 7 innings against the Dragons and gave up 2 runs with 10 strikeouts. On September 18, he pitched 7 shutout innings in his start against the Giants in Koshien Stadium and recorded his fourth win of the season. His winning streak against the Giants continued on the 29th when he notched his 7th consecutive victory against the Tigers' archrivals since July 2009, which placed 2nd to Shigeru Kobayashi's franchise record of 8 consecutive wins. Nōmi recorded one more win in September and was named the month's MVP. He finished the season 8–0 with an ERA of 2.60.

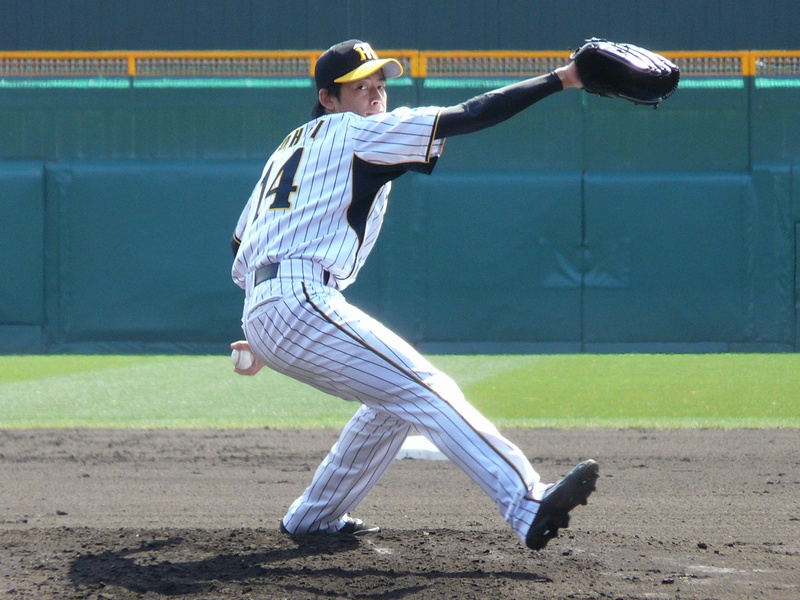
Pitching at Koshien Stadium, March 2011

2011

Nōmi notched his first win during the April 12 season opener against the Carp (7 innings, 3 runs). On May 3, he tied Kobayashi's record of 8 consecutive wins against the Giants but failed to surpass it when he took the loss on June 26 upon surrendering 3 runs in 5 innings. He ended with a 12–9 win–loss record and reached a career high of 200 innings pitched with his lowest WHIP of 1.03.

2012

Nōmi again pitched the opening game and continued to produce quality starts during the earlier part of the season. But at midseason he fell into a slump and went on a 3-game losing streak against the Giants whom he usually pitched well against. Nōmi's form improved in August, and he steamrolled through September where he won 3 of his 4 starts with an ERA of 0.55, earning him another MVP of the month award. This became his second season with double digit wins, and Nōmi topped the league in strikeouts and shutout wins.

2013

In March, Nōmi participated as a relief pitcher for Japan's National Team in the 2013 World Baseball Classic but was replaced after giving up a 2-run home run to Puerto Rico's outfielder Alex Ríos that ended Japan's 2-time WBC reign.

Nōmi didn't make the opening day roster in 2013 and also incurred a nail injury in April. But on May 6, he hit his first career solo home run off Giants pitcher Shoki Kasahara. According to retired teammate Tomoaki Kanemoto, Nōmi had been doing well during batting practices and was even quoted as wanting to hit a home run at least once. In that same game, he also earned the win by pitching a complete game. Nōmi improved on past seasons to finish at 11–7 and topped the league in complete games.

2014

Nōmi again opened the season with a game against the Giants, but he allowed 10 earned runs in 5 innings as the Tigers lost an early 4-run lead against their arch rivals. His performance began to pick up in May as he recorded double digit strikeouts in 5 consecutive starts, beating the previous league record of 4 set by Yutaka Enatsu (1971), Makoto Kito (1994) and Terry Bross (1995).

On September 6, Nōmi reached the 1,000 strikeout mark, making him the fourth-quickest pitcher in franchise history and fifteenth-quickest in NPB history to reach 1,000 strikeouts (1,130.2 innings).

Despite these achievements, Nōmi finished the season with his worst record of 9–13 (most losses in the league) due in part to a lack of stability in the mound. Nōmi did improve during the postseason, where he pitched a stellar second game in the 1st stage of the Climax Series against the Carp (October 12, Koshien). He surrendered 5 hits in 8 shutout innings, and the game ended in a 0–0 deadlock, the first in Central League CS history. Despite the tie, the Tigers advanced to the final stage since they won the 1st game and ties were awarded to the team with the better season record. Nōmi again delivered a quality start in the deciding game of the CS final stage, where he allowed only 2 runs in 5 innings and secured the Tigers' spot in the Japan Series, their first participation since 2005.

Nōmi earned his domestic free agency option during offseason but he decided to stay with the Tigers and inked a 3-year contract for an estimated 450 million yen.

2015

The Tigers finished 3rd in the Central League. Nōmi finished 2015 with an 11–13 record in 27 games (25 starts). His 13 losses were the most in the league that season. However, Nōmi added to his streak of five consecutive seasons with at least one complete-game shutout.

On December 2, 2020, he became a free agent.

=== Orix Buffaloes ===
On December 8, 2020, Nomi signed with the Orix Buffaloes of NPB as a player-coach. On September 15, 2022, he announced that he would retire from professional baseball following the season.
