= Ryo Kawashima =

Japanese baseball player

- Pitcher
- Born: September 9, 1981 (age 44); Inage-ku, Chiba, Japan
- Batted: Left Threw: Right

NPB debut
- April 4, 2004, for the Yakult Swallows

Last appearance
- August 14, 2011, for the Tokyo Yakult Swallows

NPB statistics (through 2012 season)
- Win–loss: 38–35
- Saves: 0
- Holds: 1
- ERA: 3.66
- Strikeouts: 424

Teams
- Yakult Swallows/Tokyo Yakult Swallows (2004–2011); Tohoku Rakuten Golden Eagles (2012)

Career highlights and awards
- 2004 Central League Rookie of the Year

Ryo Kawashima (川島 亮, Kawashima Ryo; born September 9, 1981 in Inage-ku, Chiba, Chiba Prefecture, Japan) is a former Nippon Professional Baseball pitcher for the Tohoku Rakuten Golden Eagles in Japan's Pacific League.
