= 2009 Fukuoka SoftBank Hawks season =

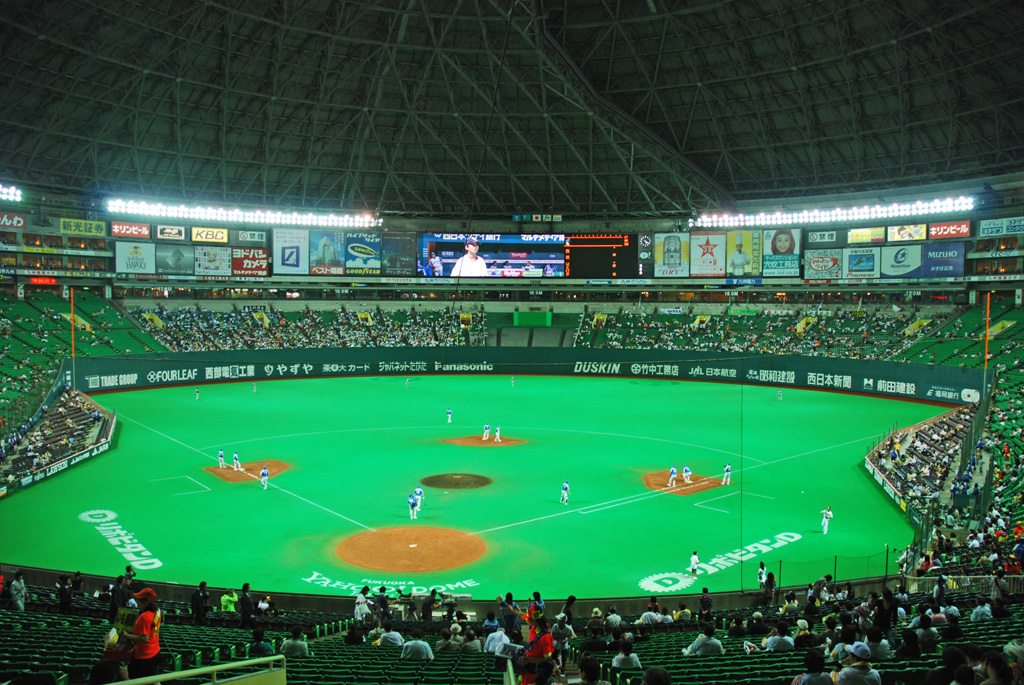

The 2009 Fukuoka SoftBank Hawks season featured the Hawks quest to win their first Pacific League title since 2003. For the first time since 1994, the Hawks had a new manager in Koji Akiyama, who replaced the legendary Sadaharu Oh.

SoftBank absorbed more injuries from Opening Day starter Tsuyoshi Wada, but saw the continued dominance of Toshiya Sugiuchi, and the emergence of foreign pitchers D.J. Houlton and Justin Germano, who stabilized the starting rotation. More foreign help came in the person of 201 cm-tall reliever Brian Falkenborg. Together with Rookie of the Year Tadashi Settsu and closer Takahiro Mahara, the Hawks had one of the most reliable bullpens in the league.

The Hawks had one of the older offenses in the league, still anchored by Nobuhiko Matsunaka and Hiroki Kokubo. Yuya Hasegawa had a breakout season (.312, 7HR, 44RBI) after suffering injuries in the previous two seasons. Hitoshi Tamura came back in mid-May and hit .283 with 17 home runs, which helped to make up for a disappointing season from Munenori Kawasaki, who batted a career-low .259 despite career highs in games played (143) and stolen bases (44).

For the second year in a row, the Hawks won the Interleague tournament. However, the team could not sustain their success as they stumbled in September, finishing 3rd and exiting in the first round of the playoffs, at the hands of the rival Tohoku Rakuten Golden Eagles.

== Regular season ==
=== Standings ===
2009 Pacific League regular season standings
Pos	Team	Pld	W	L	T	GB	PCT	Home	Away
1	Hokkaido Nippon-Ham Fighters	144	82	60	2	—	.576	46–25–1	36–35–1
2	Tohoku Rakuten Golden Eagles	144	77	66	1	6.5	.538	39–32–1	38–34–0
3	Fukuoka SoftBank Hawks	144	74	65	5	3.5	.531	40–28–4	34–37–1
4	Saitama Seibu Lions	144	70	70	4	9	.500	38–32–2	32–38–2
5	Chiba Lotte Marines	144	62	77	5	15.5	.448	37–31–4	25–46–1
6	Orix Buffaloes	144	56	86	2	26	.396	32–40–0	24–46–2

=== Game log ===
2009 Game Log
April

#	Date	Opponent	Score	Win	Loss	Save	Attendance	Record
1	April 3	Buffaloes	8 - 0	Wada (1-0)	Komatsu (0-1)		30,106	1-0-0
2	April 4	Buffaloes	2 - 5	Kondo (1-0)	Oba (0-1)	Kato (1)	28,827	1-1-0
3	April 5	Buffaloes	2 - 1 (10)	Kamiuchi (1-0)	Kawagoe (0-1)		29,576	2-1-0
4	April 7	@Eagles	6 - 0	Tanaka (1-0)	Loe (0-1)		17,281	2-2-0
5	April 8	@Eagles	0 - 7	Houlton (1-0)	Asai (0-1)		13,373	3-2-0
6	April 9	@Eagles	2 - 1	Nagai (1-0)	Otonari (0-1)	Koyama (1)	12,418	3-3-0
7	April 10	Fighters	1 - 9	Darvish (1-1)	Wada (1-1)		26,940	3-4-0
8	April 11	Fighters	0 - 9	Fujii (1-1)	Takahashi (0-1)		28,306	3-5-0
9	April 12	Fighters	5 - 4	Sugiuchi (1-0)	Sweeney (0-1)	Mahara (1)	28,296	4-5-0
10	April 14	Lions	3 - 5	Kishi (2-0)	Loe (0-2)	Graman (3)	14,451	4-6-0
11	April 15	Lions	2 - 2 (12)	Game tied after 12 innings			26,498	4-6-1
12	April 16	Lions	5 - 12	Nishiguchi (2-0)	Otonari (0-2)	Hirano (1)	25,538	4-7-1
13	April 17	@Marines	2 - 1 (11)	Ogino (1-0)	Settsu (0-1)		10,367	4-8-1
14	April 18	@Marines	4 - 7	Kume (1-0)	Ito (0-1)	Mahara (2)	23,225	5-8-1
15	April 19	@Marines	5 - 12	Sugiuchi (2-0)	Kobayashi (0-2)		25,537	6-8-1
16	April 21	@Fighters	5 - 10	Kamiuchi (2-0)	Tadano (1-2)		17,486	7-8-1
17	April 22	@Fighters	2 - 3	Houlton (2-0)	Tateyama (1-1)	Mahara (3)	19,138	8-8-1
18	April 23	@Fighters	7 - 6	Miyanishi (2-0)	Settsu (0-2)		18,364	8-9-1
19	April 24	Eagles	2 - 3	Nagai (2-0)	Wada (1-2)	Gwyn (1)	27,568	8-10-1
20	April 25	Eagles	5 - 4 (11)	Mahara (1-0)	Asai (0-3)		31,021	9-10-1
21	April 26	Eagles	0 - 4	Rasner (2-1)	Sugiuchi (2-1)	Koyama (2)	31,787	9-11-1
22	April 28	@Lions	5 - 4	Kishi (4-0)	Loe (0-3)	Onodera (1)	16,151	9-12-1
23	April 29	@Lions	7 - 2	Ishii (1-2)	Houlton (2-1)		28,855	9-13-1
24	April 30	@Lions	5 - 8	Mizuta (1-0)	Doi (1-1)	Mahara (4)	15,720	10-13-1

May

#	Date	Opponent	Score	Win	Loss	Save	Attendance	Record
25	May 1	Marines	6 - 2	Wada (2-2)	Ono (1-2)		26,830	11-13-1
26	May 2	Marines	4 - 9	Karakawa (2-2)	Arakaki (0-1)		30,239	11-14-1
27	May 3	Marines	7 - 2	Sugiuchi (3-1)	Naruse (1-1)		34,040	12-14-1
28	May 4	@Buffaloes	8 - 5	Kondo (3-1)	Loe (0-4)	Kato (6)	30,252	12-15-1
29	May 5	@Buffaloes	2 - 1	Kaneko (3-2)	Houlton (2-2)		31,639	12-16-1
30	May 6	@Buffaloes	1 - 5	Otonari (1-2)	Yamamoto (2-1)		30,960	13-16-1
31	May 8	Lions	4 - 3	Settsu (1-2)	Graman (0-2)		29,611	14-16-1
32	May 9	Lions	1 - 9	Hoashi (1-2)	Arakaki (0-2)		30,863	14-17-1
33	May 10	Lions	8 - 1	Sugiuchi (4-1)	Nogami (0-2)		30,337	15-17-1
34	May 12	Marines	1 - 2	Naruse (2-1)	Houlton (2-3)	Ogino (4)	25,231	15-18-1
35	May 13	Marines	0 - 7	Omine (2-1)	Otonari (1-3)		16,242	15-19-1
36	May 14	Marines	5 - 4	Falkenborg (1-0)	Ogino (1-1)		29,671	16-19-1
37	May 15	@Eagles	2 - 4	Falkenborg (2-0)	Koyama (1-2)	Mahara (5)	11,338	17-19-1
38	May 16	@Eagles	1 - 2	Iwakuma (5-1)	Kamiuchi (2-1)		17,768	17-20-1
—	May 17	@Eagles	Postponed (rained out)					
39	May 19	Tigers	1 - 1 (12)	Game tied after 12 innings			33,182	17-20-2
40	May 20	Tigers	3 - 2 (10)	Settsu (2-2)	Egusa (2-3)		29,258	18-20-2
41	May 22	Carp	6 - 3	Wada (3-2)	Lewis (2-2)	Mahara (6)	29,327	19-20-2
42	May 23	Carp	5 - 4	Mizuta (2-0)	Saito (2-3)	Mahara (7)	32,221	20-20-2
43	May 24	@Swallows	5 - 8	Otonari (2-3)	Kawashima (3-3)		16,518	21-20-2
44	May 25	@Swallows	2 - 3	Sugiuchi (5-1)	Ishikawa (6-2)	Mahara (8)	15,555	22-20-2
45	May 27	@Giants	3 - 5	Houlton (3-3)	Greisinger (5-4)	Mahara (9)	43,050	23-20-2
46	May 28	@Giants	8 - 2	Gonzalez (5-0)	Wada (3-3)		42,218	23-21-2
47	May 30	Dragons	9 - 5	Satō (1-0)	Nagamine (1-1)		30,387	24-21-2
48	May 31	Dragons	5 - 4	Falkenborg (3-0)	Takahashi (1-2)		33,231	25-21-2

June

#	Date	Opponent	Score	Win	Loss	Save	Attendance	Record
49	June 2	BayStars	7-3	Houlton (4-3)	Mastny (0-2)			26-21-2
50	June 3	BayStars	3-0	Fujioka (1-0)	Walrond (3-4)	Mahara (10)		27-21-2
51	June 5	@Carp	4-1	Mori (1-0)	Ohba (0-2)	Schultz (1)		27-22-2
52	June 6	@Carp	1-11 (6)	Germano (1-0)	Ohtake (5-2)			28-22-2
53	June 7	@Tigers	4-3	Williams (1-0)	Mahara (1-1)			28-23-2
54	June 8	@Tigers	1-8	Houlton (5-3)	Kubo (1-4)			29-23-2
55	June 10	Swallows	4-2	Fujioka	Yoshinori (2-4)	Mahara (11)		30-23-2
56	June 11	Swallows	3-6	Tateyama	Satō	Lim		30-24-2
57	June 13	Giants	3-1	Germano	Utsumi	Mahara (12)		31-24-2
58	June 14	Giants	5-1	Sugiuchi	Tohno			32-24-2
59	June 16	@Dragons	3-4 (10)	Mahara	Iwase	Falkenborg		33-24-2
60	June 17	@Dragons	3-1	Ogasawara	Fujioka	Iwase		33-25-2
61	June 20	@BayStars	7-11	Germano	Glynn			36-25-2
62	June 21	@BayStars	5-0	Sugiuchi	Miura			37-25-2
63	June 26	@Lions	10-4	Wakui	Fujioka			37-26-2
64	June 27	@Lions	3-10	Sugiuchi	Ishii			38-26-2
65	June 28	@Lions	5-7	Falkenborg	Mitsui	Mahara		39-26-2
66	June 30	Buffaloes	13-2	Ohtonari	Kondoh			40-26-2

July

#	Date	Opponent	Score	Win	Loss	Save	Attendance	Record
—	July 1	Buffaloes	Postponed (rained out)					
67	July 2	Buffaloes						
68	July 4	@Fighters						
69	July 5	@Fighters						
70	July 7	@Buffaloes						
71	July 8	@Buffaloes						
72	July 9	@Buffaloes						
73	July 10	Eagles						
74	July 11	Eagles						
75	July 12	Eagles						
76	July 14	Fighters						
77	July 15	Fighters						
78	July 16	Fighters						
79	July 17	@Marines						
80	July 18	@Marines						
81	July 19	@Marines						
82	July 20	Eagles						
83	July 21	Eagles						
84	July 22	Eagles						
85	July 28	Buffaloes						
86	July 29	Buffaloes						
87	July 30	Buffaloes						
88	July 31	@Fighters						

August

#	Date	Opponent	Score	Win	Loss	Save	Attendance	Record
89	August 1	@Fighters						
90	August 2	@Fighters						
91	August 4	Marines						
92	August 5	Marines						
93	August 6	Marines						
94	August 7	@Lions						
95	August 8	@Lions						
96	August 9	@Lions						
97	August 11	@Eagles						
98	August 12	@Eagles						
99	August 13	@Eagles						
100	August 14	@Buffaloes						
101	August 15	@Buffaloes						
102	August 16	@Buffaloes						
103	August 18	Lions						
104	August 19	Lions						
105	August 20	Lions						
106	August 21	Fighters						
107	August 22	Fighters						
108	August 23	Fighters						
109	August 25	@Marines						
110	August 26	@Marines						
111	August 27	@Marines						
112	August 28	@Fighters						
113	August 29	@Fighters						
114	August 30	@Fighters						

September

#	Date	Opponent	Score	Win	Loss	Save	Attendance	Record
115	September 1	Buffaloes						
116	September 2	Buffaloes						
117	September 3	Buffaloes						
118	September 4	Lions						
119	September 5	Lions						
120	September 6	Lions						
121	September 8	@Marines						
122	September 9	@Marines						
123	September 10	@Marines						
124	September 11	Eagles						
125	September 12	Eagles						
126	September 13	Eagles						
127	September 15	@Buffaloes						
128	September 16	@Buffaloes						
129	September 17	@Buffaloes						
130	September 18	@Lions						
131	September 19	@Lions						
132	September 20	@Lions						
133	September 21	Marines						
134	September 22	Marines						
135	September 23	Marines						
136	September 25	Fighters						
137	September 26	Fighters						
138	September 27	Fighters						
139	September 29	@Eagles						
140	September 30	@Eagles						

October

#	Date	Opponent	Score	Win	Loss	Save	Attendance	Record
141	October 1	@Eagles						
—	October 2	@Eagles	Postponed (rained out)					
142	October 4	@Fighters						
143	October 6	Buffaloes						
144	October 11	@Eagles						
PLCS Game 1	October 16	@Eagles						
PLCS Game 2	October 17	@Eagles						

== Player stats ==
=== Batting ===
Player	G	AB	H	Avg.	HR	RBI	SB

=== Pitching ===
Player	G	GS	IP	W	L	SV	ERA	SO
