= 2012 Pacific League Climax Series =

Japanese baseball series

First stage
Team (Wins)		Manager	Season
Fukuoka SoftBank Hawks (2)		Koji Akiyama	67–65–12 (.508), 6½ GB
Saitama Seibu Lions (1)		Hisanobu Watanabe	72–63–9 (.533), 3 GB
- Dates: October 13–15

Final stage
Team (Wins)		Manager	Season
Hokkaido Nippon-Ham Fighters (4)		Hideki Kuriyama	74–59–11 (.556), 3 GA
Fukuoka SoftBank Hawks (0)		Koji Akiyama	67–65–12 (.508), 6½ GB
- Dates: October 17–19
- MVP: Yoshio Itoi (Nippon-Ham)

The 2012 Pacific League Climax Series (PLCS) consisted of two consecutive series, Stage 1 being a best-of-three series and Stage 2 being a best-of-six with the top seed being awarded a one-win advantage. The winner of the series advanced to the 2012 Japan Series, where they competed against the 2012 Central League Climax Series winner. The top three regular-season finishers played in the two series. The PLCS began on with the first game of Stage 1 on October 13 and ended with the final game of Stage 2 on October 19.

== First stage ==
=== Summary ===
Fukuoka SoftBank Hawks won the series, 2–1.

Game	Date	Score	Location	Time	Attendance
1	October 13	Fukuoka SoftBank Hawks – 2, Saitama Seibu Lions – 1	Seibu Dome	2:54	32,074
2	October 14	Fukuoka SoftBank Hawks – 0, Saitama Seibu Lions – 8	Seibu Dome	3:23	33,918
3	October 15	Fukuoka SoftBank Hawks – 3, Saitama Seibu Lions – 2	Seibu Dome	3:23	25,002

=== Game 1 ===
Saturday, October 13, 2012 at Seibu Dome in Tokorozawa, Saitama Prefecture
Team	1	2	3	4	5	6	7	8	9	R	H	E
SoftBank	0	1	1	0	0	0	0	0	0	2	7	1
Seibu	0	0	0	0	0	0	0	0	1	1	5	0
WP: Tadashi Settsu (1–0) LP: Kazuhisa Makita (0–1) Sv: Masahiko Morifuku (1)

=== Game 2 ===
Sunday, October 14, 2012 at Seibu Dome in Tokorozawa, Saitama Prefecture
Team	1	2	3	4	5	6	7	8	9	R	H	E
SoftBank	0	0	0	0	0	0	0	0	0	0	7	2
Seibu	0	0	7	1	0	0	0	0	X	8	9	1
WP: Takayuki Kishi (1–0) LP: Shota Takeda (0–1)

=== Game 3 ===
Monday, October 15, 2012 at Seibu Dome in Tokorozawa, Saitama Prefecture
Team	1	2	3	4	5	6	7	8	9	R	H	E
SoftBank	0	0	0	2	0	0	0	1	0	3	6	0
Seibu	0	0	0	1	0	0	0	0	1	2	6	0
WP: Kenji Otonari (1–0) LP: Kazuhisa Ishii (0–1) Sv: Hideki Okajima (1); Home runs: SOF: None; SEI: Takeya Nakamura (1), José Ortiz (1)

== Final stage ==
=== Summary ===
Hokkaido Nippon-Ham Fighters won the series, 4–0*.

Game	Date	Score	Location	Time	Attendance
1	October 17	Fukuoka SoftBank Hawks – 2, Hokkaido Nippon-Ham Fighters – 3	Sapporo Dome	2:56	31,022
2	October 18	Fukuoka SoftBank Hawks – 0, Hokkaido Nippon-Ham Fighters – 3	Sapporo Dome	3:17	23,610
3	October 19	Fukuoka SoftBank Hawks – 2, Hokkaido Nippon-Ham Fighters – 4	Sapporo Dome	3:16	37,166

* The Pacific League regular season champion is given a one-game advantage in the Final Stage.

=== Game 1 ===
Wednesday, October 17, 2012 at Sapporo Dome in Sapporo, Hokkaido
Team	1	2	3	4	5	6	7	8	9	R	H	E
SoftBank	0	0	0	0	0	0	2	0	0	2	9	0
Nippon-Ham	0	0	0	0	0	0	3	0	X	3	6	0
WP: Mitsuo Yoshikawa (1–0) LP: Yoshiaki Fujioka (0–1) Sv: Hisashi Takeda (1); Home runs: SOF: None; NIP: Yoshio Itoi (1)

=== Game 2 ===
Thursday, October 18, 2012 at Sapporo Dome in Sapporo, Hokkaido
Team	1	2	3	4	5	6	7	8	9	R	H	E
SoftBank	0	0	0	0	0	0	0	0	0	0	6	1
Nippon-Ham	1	0	0	0	0	0	2	0	X	3	5	0
WP: Masaru Takeda (1–0) LP: Nagisa Arakaki (0–1) Sv: Hisashi Takeda (2); Home runs: SOF: None; NIP: Yoshio Itoi (2)

=== Game 3 ===
Friday, October 19, 2012 at Sapporo Dome in Sapporo, Hokkaido
Team	1	2	3	4	5	6	7	8	9	R	H	E
SoftBank	0	0	0	0	0	0	1	1	0	2	5	1
Nippon-Ham	3	0	0	0	0	1	0	0	X	4	8	0
WP: Brian Wolfe (1–0) LP: Tadashi Settsu (0–1) Sv: Hisashi Takeda (3); Home runs: SOF: Wily Mo Peña (1); NIP: None
