= 2011 Japan Series =

Team (Wins)	Managers	Season
Fukuoka SoftBank Hawks (4)	Koji Akiyama	88–46–10, (.657), GA: 17.5
Chunichi Dragons (3)	Hiromitsu Ochiai	75–59–10, (.560), GA: 2.5
- Dates: November 12–20
- MVP: Hiroki Kokubo (Fukuoka)
- FSA: Kazuhiro Wada (Chunichi)

Broadcast
- Television: In Japan: TV Nishinippon and Fuji TV (Game 1); TV Tokyo (Games 2, 5); Tokai TV and Fuji TV (Game 3); TBS (Games 4, 7); KBC and TV Asahi (Game 6)
- TV announcers: Nobuo Yoshida (Fuji TV), Tomoki Uekusa (TV Tokyo), Atsushi Moriwaki (Tokai TV), Hiroyuki Takada (CBC), Takao Nakayama (TV Asahi), Masahiro Hayashi (TBS)

The 2011 Japan Series (known as the Konami Nippon Series 2011 for sponsorship reasons) was the 62nd edition of Nippon Professional Baseball's championship series. The best-of-seven playoff matched the Chunichi Dragons and Fukuoka SoftBank Hawks, the respective champions of the Central League's and the Pacific League's Climax Series (postseason). The Series began on Saturday, November 12, 2011 and was a rematch of the 1999 Japan Series, which the Hawks won, four games to one.

Due to the 2011 Tohoku Earthquake delaying the season opener to April 12, the Japan Series was delayed to mid-November. The Hawks won the series in seven games, claiming their fifth Japan Series crown.

== Climax Series ==
First Stage
Central League
2	Tokyo Yakult Swallows	2
3	Yomiuri Giants	1
Pacific League
2	Hokkaido Nippon-Ham Fighters	0
3	Saitama Seibu Lions	2

Final Stage
1	Chunichi Dragons	4
2	Tokyo Yakult Swallows	2
1	Fukuoka SoftBank Hawks	4
3	Saitama Seibu Lions	0

Japan Series
CL1	Chunichi Dragons	3
PL1	Fukuoka SoftBank Hawks	4

== Summary ==
Fukuoka SoftBank Hawks won the series, 4–3.

Game	Date	Score	Location	Time	Attendance
1	November 12	Chunichi Dragons – 2, Fukuoka SoftBank Hawks – 1 (10)	Yahoo Dome	3:31	34,457
2	November 13	Chunichi Dragons – 2, Fukuoka SoftBank Hawks – 1 (10)	Yahoo Dome	3:44	34,758
3	November 15	Fukuoka SoftBank Hawks – 4, Chunichi Dragons – 2	Nagoya Dome	3:22	38,041
4	November 16	Fukuoka SoftBank Hawks – 2, Chunichi Dragons – 1	Nagoya Dome	3:40	38,041
5	November 17	Fukuoka SoftBank Hawks – 5, Chunichi Dragons – 0	Nagoya Dome	3:49	38,051
6	November 19	Chunichi Dragons – 2, Fukuoka SoftBank Hawks – 1	Yahoo Dome	3:07	34,927
7	November 20	Chunichi Dragons – 0, Fukuoka SoftBank Hawks – 3	Yahoo Dome	3:30	34,737

== Road to the Series ==
=== Fukuoka SoftBank Hawks ===
After not having won a playoff series since 2003 when they won the Japan Series that year, the Hawks finally broke through against the Saitama Seibu Lions. Earning a first-round bye and a one-game advantage in the Pacific League Climax Series Final Stage, the Hawks completed the sweep of the Lions to earn their spot in the Japan Series.

During the regular season, the Hawks were the best team in the league record-wise at 88-46-10. They scored the second-most runs in the league (550) and allowed the fewest (351), while also stealing the most bases and leading the league in team batting average (.267). Leading the team offensively was new acquisition Seiichi Uchikawa, who led the entire league in batting average at .338. He was helped by two longtime Hawks mainstays at the top of the lineup, Munenori Kawasaki and Yuichi Honda, who stole 91 bases between them. Providing the power was Nobuhiro Matsuda, who finally had a breakout season with 25 home runs and 83 runs batted in, both team highs.

In a pitching-heavy year for NPB, the Hawks had a three-headed monster that finished 3-4-5 in ERA. Tsuyoshi Wada (16-5, 1.51), Toshiya Sugiuchi (8-7, 1.91) and D. J. Houlton (19-6, 2.19) anchored the Hawks rotation, and Houlton had the most wins by a foreigner since Gene Bacque. The bullpen featured another breakout star in Masahiko Morifuku, who led the team in holds with 34 and had a 1.13 ERA to go along with it. Closing duties were split between regular closer Takahiro Mahara and another stellar foreigner, Brian Falkenborg, who each had 19 saves.

=== Chunichi Dragons ===
Chunichi also won the Central League with the best record at 75-59-10, defeating the Tokyo Yakult Swallows 4-2 in the Central League Climax Series. The Dragons had been to the Japan Series the previous season but fell to the Chiba Lotte Marines in seven games. This was Chunichi's third Japan Series appearance in the last five years, winning in 2007 against the Hokkaido Nippon-Ham Fighters.

Returning largely the same team as the previous season, the Dragons showcased an excellent pitching staff that covered up for a league-worst offense that only batted .228 as a team. The offensive leaders were Tony Blanco, who hit 16 home runs during the season while batting .248. Masahiro Araki led the team in batting average at .263 and also stolen bases with 18.

The pitching staff was led by a stellar foreigner of their own in Maximo Nelson, who may have had a losing record at 10-14 with a 2.52 ERA, but was the only pitcher on the staff who threw 200 innings. Veteran Kazuki Yoshimi offset this with an 18-3 record and a 1.63 ERA, and Taiwanese lefty Chen Wei-Yin added eight wins of his own.

The bullpen was the real star, though, as it had four relievers who posted ERA's under 2.00. Takuya Asao led the pack with a nigh-unhittable 0.41 ERA and a 7-2 record while also leading the league in holds with 45 and also getting 10 saves. Masato Kobayashi also was dominant with a 0.87 ERA and 18 holds in 58 innings, and Yoshihiro Suzuki added 12 holds of his own while also posting a 1.08 ERA. The anchor in the bullpen was longtime closer Hitoki Iwase, who saved 37 games during the season.

== Game summaries ==
=== Game 1 ===
Saturday, November 12, 2011, 1:00 pm (JST) at Fukuoka Yahoo! Japan Dome in Fukuoka, Fukuoka Prefecture
Team	1	2	3	4	5	6	7	8	9	10	R	H	E
Chunichi	0	0	0	0	0	0	1	0	0	1	2	4	1
SoftBank	0	0	0	1	0	0	0	0	0	0	1	4	1
Starting pitchers: CHU: Chen Wei-Yin (0-0); FSH: Tsuyoshi Wada (0-0); WP: Takuya Asao (1-0) LP: Takahiro Mahara (0-1) Sv: Hitoki Iwase (1); Home runs: CHU: Kazuhiro Wada (1), Masaaki Koike (1); FSH: None; Attendance: 34,457

=== Game 2 ===
Sunday, November 13, 2011, 6:16 pm (JST) at Fukuoka Yahoo! Japan Dome in Fukuoka, Fukuoka Prefecture
Team	1	2	3	4	5	6	7	8	9	10	R	H	E
Chunichi	0	0	0	0	0	0	1	0	0	1	2	7	0
SoftBank	0	0	0	0	0	0	1	0	0	0	1	8	0
Starting pitchers: CHU: Kazuki Yoshimi (0-0); FSH: Toshiya Sugiuchi (0-0); WP: Masafumi Hirai (1-0) LP: Takahiro Mahara (0-2) Sv: Hitoki Iwase (2); Attendance: 34,758

=== Game 3 ===
Tuesday, November 15, 2011, 6:11 pm (JST) at Nagoya Dome in Nagoya, Aichi Prefecture
Team	1	2	3	4	5	6	7	8	9	R	H	E
SoftBank	1	0	0	2	0	0	0	1	0	4	12	1
Chunichi	0	0	0	0	0	1	0	1	0	2	4	1
WP: Tadashi Settsu (1-0) LP: Maximo Nelson (0-1) Sv: Brian Falkenborg (1); Home runs: FSH: Hitoshi Tamura (1), Toru Hosokawa (1); CHU: None; Attendance: 38,041

=== Game 4 ===
Wednesday, November 16, 2011, 6:35 pm (JST) at Nagoya Dome in Nagoya, Aichi Prefecture
Team	1	2	3	4	5	6	7	8	9	R	H	E
SoftBank	2	0	0	0	0	0	0	0	0	2	8	0
Chunichi	0	0	0	0	1	0	0	0	0	1	5	1
Starting pitchers: FSH: D. J. Houlton (0-0); CHU: Yudai Kawai (0-0); WP: D. J. Houlton (1-0) LP: Yudai Kawai (0-1) Sv: Brian Falkenborg (2); Attendance: 38,041

=== Game 5 ===
Thursday, November 17, 2011, 6:15 pm (JST) at Nagoya Dome in Nagoya, Aichi Prefecture
Team	1	2	3	4	5	6	7	8	9	R	H	E
SoftBank	1	0	0	0	0	0	1	3	0	5	10	0
Chunichi	0	0	0	0	0	0	0	0	0	0	5	0
Starting pitchers: FSH: Hiroki Yamada (0-0); CHU: Chen Wei-Yin (0-0); WP: Hiroki Yamada (1-0) LP: Chen Wei-Yin (0-1); Attendance: 38,051

=== Game 6 ===
Saturday, November 19, 2011, 6:17 pm (JST) at Fukuoka Yahoo! Japan Dome in Fukuoka, Fukuoka Prefecture
Team	1	2	3	4	5	6	7	8	9	R	H	E
Chunichi	2	0	0	0	0	0	0	0	0	2	5	0
SoftBank	0	0	0	1	0	0	0	0	0	1	5	0
Starting pitchers: CHU: Kazuki Yoshimi (0-0); FSH: Tsuyoshi Wada (0-0); WP: Kazuki Yoshimi (1-0) LP: Tsuyoshi Wada (0-1) Sv: Takuya Asao (1); Attendance: 34,927

=== Game 7 ===
Sunday, November 20, 2011, 6:33 pm (JST) at Fukuoka Yahoo! Japan Dome in Fukuoka, Fukuoka Prefecture
Team	1	2	3	4	5	6	7	8	9	R	H	E
Chunichi	0	0	0	0	0	0	0	0	0	0	4	0
SoftBank	0	0	1	1	0	0	1	0	X	3	8	0
Starting pitchers: CHU: Daisuke Yamai (0-0); FSH: Toshiya Sugiuchi (0-0); WP: Toshiya Sugiuchi (1-0) LP: Daisuke Yamai (0-1) Sv: Tadashi Settsu (1); Attendance: 34,737

== See also ==
- 2011 Korean Series
- 2011 World Series
