= Tsuyoshi Wada =

Japanese baseball player (born 1981)

Tsuyoshi Wada 和田 毅
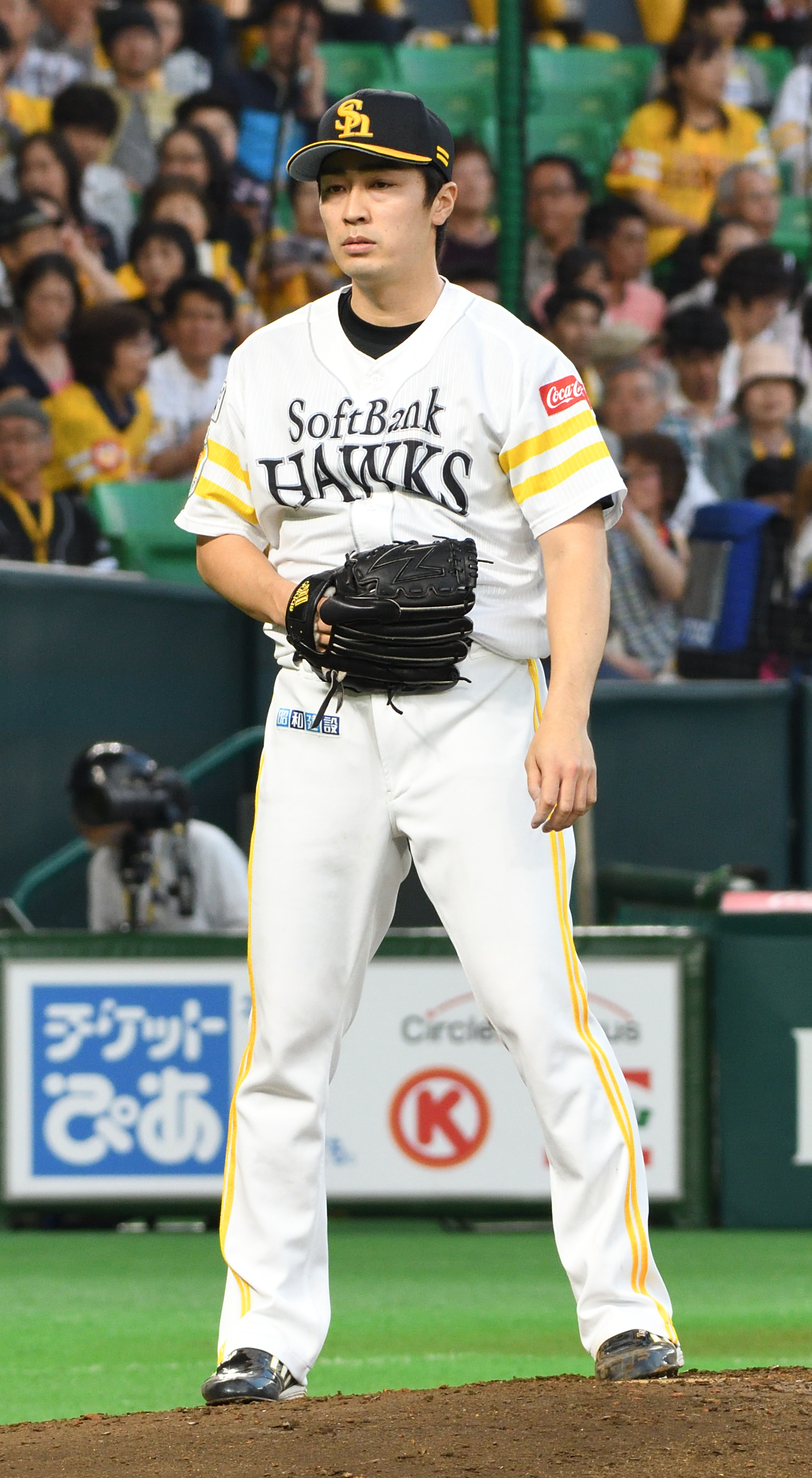
- Wada with the Fukuoka SoftBank Hawks in 2016.
- Pitcher
- Born: February 21, 1981 (age 45); Kōnan, Aichi, Japan
- Batted: Left Threw: Left

Professional debut
- NPB: April 1, 2003, for the Fukuoka Daiei Hawks
- MLB: July 8, 2014, for the Chicago Cubs

Last appearance
- NPB: October 1, 2024, for the Fukuoka SoftBank Hawks
- MLB: September 4, 2015, for the Chicago Cubs

NPB statistics
- Win–loss record: 160-89
- ERA: 3.18
- Strikeouts: 1,901 (Team record)

MLB statistics
- Win–loss record: 5–5
- Earned run average: 3.36
- Strikeouts: 88
- Stats at Baseball Reference

Teams
- Fukuoka Daiei Hawks/Fukuoka SoftBank Hawks (2003–2011); Chicago Cubs (2014–2015); Fukuoka SoftBank Hawks (2016–2024)

Career highlights and awards
- Pacific League Rookie of the Year (2003); Pacific League MVP (2010); Golden Spirit Award (2006); Pacific League Best Nine Award (2010); 2× Pacific League the most wins Champion (2010, 2016); Pacific League Winning percentage Leader (2016); 6× NPB All-Star (2003, 2004, 2010, 2011, 2016, 2023); 5× Japan Series champion (2003, 2011, 2017, 2019–2020)
Medals
Men's baseball
Representing Japan
Olympic Games
Bronze medal – third place	2004 Athens	Team competition
World Baseball Classic
Gold medal – first place	2006 San Diego	Team competition

Tsuyoshi Wada (和田 毅, Wada Tsuyoshi; born February 21, 1981) is a Japanese former professional baseball pitcher. He played in Nippon Professional Baseball (NPB) from 2003 to 2011, and 2016 to 2024 for the Fukuoka SoftBank Hawks. He also played in Major League Baseball (MLB) from 2014 to 2015 for the Chicago Cubs.

Wada pitched in the 2004 Athens and 2008 Beijing Olympics as well as the 2006 World Baseball Classic for the Japanese national team. He set a Tokyo Big6 Baseball League record with 476 strikeouts during his college career at Waseda University and was the Pacific League Most Valuable Rookie in 2003.

== Early life ==
Wada was born in Kōnan, Aichi Prefecture. He began playing baseball as a first grader at Kōnan Municipal Fujisato Elementary School for the Kōnan Danchi Baseball team.

In 1991, Wada and his family moved to Izumo, Shimane Prefecture, his father's hometown. Wada enrolled in Shimane Prefectural Hamada High School in Hamada upon graduating from junior high, leading them to the 79th National High School Baseball Championship in the summer of his second year of high school (the equivalent of 11th grade in the United States) in 1997. His team faced Akita Commercial High School, led by Masanori Ishikawa, in the first round, but Wada walked Ishikawa with the bases loaded in the bottom of the ninth inning and suffered a walk-off loss.

Wada's team secured a berth in the national tournament again the following summer (1998). They defeated Niigata Prefectural Shibata Agricultural High School, whose battery consisted of right-hander Kazuhiro Togashi (who later played for the Hokkaido Nippon-Ham Fighters) and catcher Ken Katoh, in their first game. They faced Teikyo High School, the East Tokyo champions, in their next game. Though Wada, who was not only the team's ace but also their cleanup hitter, gave up a home run to Hichori Morimoto, Hamada High won 3–2, making it to the quarter-finals. They narrowly lost in the quarter-finals to Toyota Otani High School (led by Katsuaki Furuki) in extra innings.

Though Wada had ruptured his left triceps muscle the previous fall and struggled to even reach 130 km/h (81 mph) with his fastball during the tournament, Teikyo High players remarked after facing Wada that "[his fastball] looked like it was 150 km/h (93 mph)."

As a player who was born in the 1980 Japanese academic year and participated in the 1998 Summer Championship, Wada is considered a member of the "Matsuzaka Generation".

== College career ==
Wada went on to enroll at Waseda University as a human sciences major after graduating from Hamada High. He made his collegiate debut in the fall of his freshman year, pitching in a game against the University of Tokyo on September 12. He rebuilt his pitching mechanics from scratch that year, succeeding in increasing the velocity of his fastball until it consistently hit speeds of 140 km/h (87 mph) and above within a mere two months of joining the team. He became a full-fledged starter for Waseda in the spring of his second year, drawing attention with the furious pace with which he racked up strikeouts.

=== 2002 ===
Taking on the uniform number 18 that had traditionally denoted the team's lefty ace (previously worn by Shugo Fujii), Wada led Waseda to consecutive Tokyo Big6 league titles in the spring and summer seasons of his senior year (2002) for the first time in university history since 1950. He received the league Best Nine Award in both seasons.

That year, Waseda earned a berth in both the 51st All-Japan University Baseball Championship Series as well as the Meiji Jingu Tournament, but the team fell short of a championship in both tournaments, losing to Asia University (whose pitching staff featured right-handers Katsuhiro Nagakawa and Hiroshi Kisanuki, both of whom would later turn professional) in the finals in the former and succumbing to Tohoku Fukushi University in the semi-finals in the latter.

Wada set a new Tokyo Big6 record for career strikeouts that year, surpassing the 443 set by Suguru Egawa (who later pitched for the Yomiuri Giants) and finishing with 476. He also set a new Waseda record in wins for left-handed pitchers, finishing his college career with a 27–13 record and a 1.35 ERA. His dedication and commitment were said to have had a positive influence on younger players on the team like Norichika Aoki, Takashi Toritani, Toshimitsu Higa and Shintaro Yoshida (all of whom later went pro), the core that later led Waseda to four consecutive league titles for the first time in Tokyo Big6 history.

Wada was dubbed the "Dr. K (à la former Major League Baseball pitcher Dwight Gooden) of the Tokyo Big6" during his college years and was one of the most coveted prospects in Japanese college baseball as he entered his senior year. He was signed by the Fukuoka Daiei Hawks as a pre-draft pick along with right-handermdy Nagisa Arakaki of Kyushu Kyoritsu University prior to the 2002 NPB amateur draft that fall and was assigned the uniform number 21.

== Professional career ==
=== Fukuoka (Daiei / SoftBank) Hawks ===
==== 2003 ====
Wada secured a spot in the Hawks' starting rotation from his rookie year (2003), making his professional debut in a regular season game against the Osaka Kintetsu Buffaloes on April 1 (he gave up five runs in 6 2/3 innings). He earned the first win of his career against the Seibu Lions on April 8, pitching six shutout innings, and recorded his first career complete game win (a shutout) against the Chiba Lotte Marines on April 16. Overall, he finished the year with a 14–5 record, 3.38 ERA and 195 strikeouts (second only to young Lions right-hander Daisuke Matsuzaka's 215), earning Pacific League Most Valuable Rookie honors. He also played an instrumental role in the Hawks' league title and subsequent Japan Series championship, pitching a complete game win as a rookie for the first time in Japan Series history in Game 7 of the series. He played in the 2003 Asian Baseball Championship (which also functioned as the Asian qualifying tournament for the 2004 Athens Olympics) as a member of the Japanese national team in November, pitching 5 1/3 shutout innings against South Korea in the final game of the tournament to clinch a berth in the Olympics.

==== 2004 ====
Wada played in the 2004 Athens Olympics, contributing to Japan's bronze medal finish in the tournament by earning two wins against Canada (one in the preliminary round, the other in the bronze medal game) while holding them to two runs over twelve innings. However, he fell victim to a sophomore slump in the NPB regular season, going 10–6 but racking up a 4.35 ERA and striking out just 115 batters (despite this, his batting average against was a league-best .228).

==== 2005 ====
In 2005, Wada was named the starter for the Hawks' season opener for the first time in his career, taking the mound against the Fighters on March 26 and holding them to one run over 7 2/3 innings while striking out eight en route to the win (though he required 135 pitches). He finished the year with a 12–8 record and a much-improved 3.27 ERA, becoming the first pitcher to record double-digit wins in each of his first three seasons in Hawks franchise history since Tadashi Sugiura accomplished the feat in 1960.

On December 10, the Hawks made it public that Wada had married swimsuit model and actress Kasumi Nakane. The couple had their wedding ceremony at Izumo Taisha, a Shinto shrine, on December 14.

==== 2006 ====
Wada was chosen for the inaugural 2006 World Baseball Classic as a member of the Japanese national team but saw little playing time as a middle reliever, coming on in relief in Japan's second-round match against Mexico and pitching two shutout innings in his first and only appearance of the tournament. (Japan won the game 6–1.)

Wada had perhaps his finest year yet in the regular season, pitching just 163 1/3 innings but going 14–6 with a career-best 2.98 ERA and allowing the fewest walks and hits per inning pitched of his career (1.10). His wife, Kasumi, gave birth to their first child on September 13.

==== 2007 ====
Though Wada improved on his ERA still more by lowering it to 2.82 in the 2007 season, he was plagued by poor run support and went 12–10 for the year. He pitched the most innings (182) and amassed the most strikeouts (169) since his rookie campaign and became the only active pitcher other than Masanori Ishikawa (and the first in Hawks franchise history since Sugiura) to record double-digit wins in each of the first five seasons of his professional career.

Wada underwent endoscopic surgery in Los Angeles during the season to remove articular cartilage fragments in his left elbow after experiencing discomfort in the region during the season.

==== 2008 ====
The rehab that Wada had to undergo following the elbow surgery kept him from making his first start of 2008 until April 6, roughly two and a half weeks into the season. Despite the delay, he started the season of well, putting up eight wins before the All-Star break and garnering selection to the Japanese national team that would play in the 2008 Beijing Olympics. However, he did not pitch well in the Olympics, giving up six runs (five earned) in two starts en route to a 4.82 ERA over 9 1/3 innings (albeit while striking out 13) and being one of the factors in Japan's disappointing fourth-place finish behind South Korea, Cuba and the United States.

After returning to Japan in late August, Wada pitched 10 shutout innings and struck out 10 in one no-decision against the Lions on August 31 (the game ended in a 0–0 tie after 12 innings) and held the Lions to one run in 10 innings yet again while striking out 12 on September 20, this time in a tough 1–0 loss. While he pitched reliably, recording a 3.18 ERA in his final six starts of the season, he was victimized by a lack of run support and failed to put up double-digit wins for the first time in his professional career.

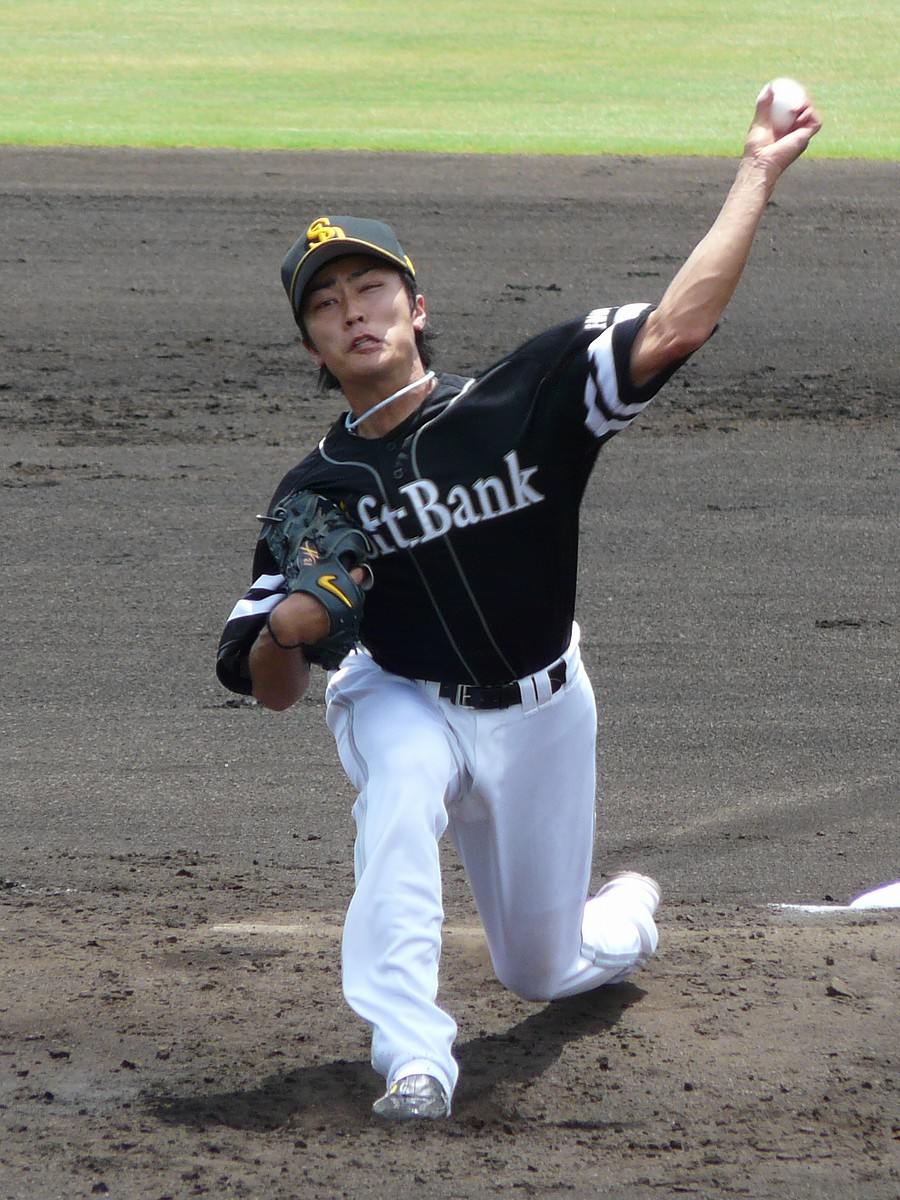
Wada's first stint with the Fukuoka SoftBank Hawks in 2009

==== 2009 ====
In 2009, Wada was named to the national team's preliminary roster for the upcoming World Baseball Classic along with teammates first baseman Nobuhiko Matsunaka, starter Toshiya Sugiuchi, closer Takahiro Mahara and shortstop Munenori Kawasaki. However, though he took part in the training camp held in Miyazaki in mid-February, he and Matsunaka were cut from the final 28-man team before the tournament.

Wada showed no signs of disappointment in his pitching, taking the mound in the Hawks' season opener on April 3 and striking out 14 (tying both his career high and the NPB record for strikeouts in a season opener) en route to a three-hit, complete game shutout against the Buffaloes in one of the most dominant starts of his young career. However, more injury trouble found Wada in the form of left elbow inflammation. He went to the United States for treatment, and was taken off the active roster on June 11. He was expected to miss at least three weeks initially but did not return until September 9, when he was hammered by the Chiba Lotte Marines for 6 runs in 3 2/3 innings. Wada finished 2009 with a record of 4–5 with a 4.06 ERA.

==== 2010 ====
Wada started the 2010 campaign pegged as the fourth starter in the rotation behind Toshiya Sugiuchi, Kenji Ohtonari, and D.J. Houlton. His first start of the season came against the Orix Buffaloes, and he gave up two runs on three hits in five innings, walking two and striking out eight. Despite the performance, he took the loss. More of the same came from Wada in his second outing against the Saitama Seibu Lions, as he gave up four runs on five hits in five innings, but he earned the win.

His third start was one of the best in his career, as he gave up one run on four hits in a complete-game effort, striking out a career-high 15 Marines to record his second win of the season. He continued his winning ways into interleague, where he won all five of his starts, going at least six innings every start and striking out at least five batters, by the end of interleague, he had won nine games.

Wada was selected for the All-Star Series in 2010 and started game 1. His teammate Sugiuchi Toshiya started game 2. They led the Pacific League in wins through most of the season. It was their fine form that carried the Hawks to the league title, as the rest of the team's starters struggled. Wada was named Pacific League MVP.

==== 2011 ====
Wada and the Fukuoka SoftBank Hawks defeated the Chunichi Dragons in seven games to win the 2011 Japan Series.

=== Move to the MLB (2012–2015) ===
On December 14, 2011, Wada agreed to a two-year deal with the Baltimore Orioles, including an option for a third year.

Wada underwent Tommy John surgery on May 11, 2012 due to a partially torn ligament in his left elbow and spent the rest of the 2012 season on the disabled list. He started the 2013 season on the 60-day disabled list, and was expected to join the Orioles around June 1. He started a rehab assignment with the Triple-A Norfolk Tides on May 16. On June 14, he was activated from the 60-day disabled list and optioned to Norfolk. He never played in an MLB game for the Orioles.

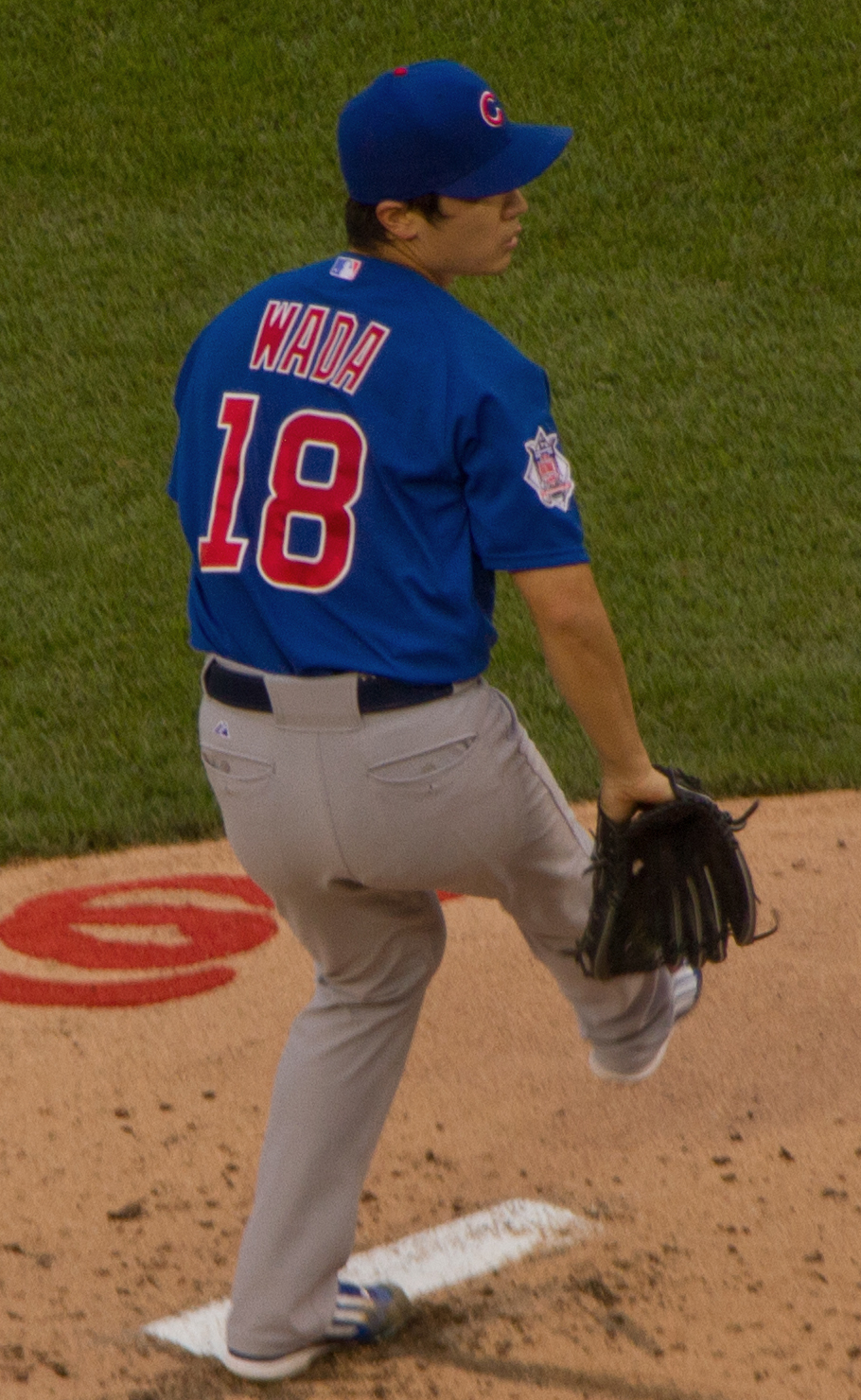
Wada pitching for the Chicago Cubs in 2015

Wada signed a minor-league contract with an invitation to spring training with the Chicago Cubs on January 24, 2014, but he was released on March 23. He re-signed with the Cubs on another minor league contract the next day. His contract was selected from the Triple-A Iowa Cubs on June 22, and he was optioned to Iowa. He was recalled by the Cubs on July 8, and started the second game of that day's doubleheader against the Cincinnati Reds.

In 2014 Wada compiled a 4–4 record and a 3.25 ERA. His strongest outing came on August 24, when he took a no-hitter into the seventh inning against the Orioles. He was removed from the game after giving up a solo home run, the only hit he allowed all day. The Cubs won 2–1, and Wada was credited with the win. He was signed to a one-year $4 million contract after the season. Wada made seven starts for the Cubs during May and June 2015 before suffering a shoulder injury. He returned in September but pitched out of the bullpen.

=== Fukuoka SoftBank Hawks (second stint) ===
==== 2016 ====
Wada returned to Japan, signing again with the Fukuoka SoftBank Hawks of Nippon Professional Baseball for the 2016 season. He finished the regular season with a 15–5 win–loss record, 3.04 ERA, and 157 strikeouts in 163 innings. He had the most wins and best winning percentage in the Pacific League.

==== 2017 ====
On May 22, Wada had left elbow surgery and spent three months in rehabilitation. On August 27, he made a comeback and pitched against the Chiba Lotte Marines, and recorded 1,500 strikeouts in total. He finished the 2017 regular season with a 4–0 record, 2.49 ERA, and 34 strikeouts in 47 innings. On November 1, he started against the Yokohama DeNA BayStars in the Japan Series.

==== 2018 ====
Wada spent the 2018 season on rehabilitation for left shoulder pain.

==== 2019 ====
On June 5, Wada made a comeback and pitched in Interleague play (NPB) against the Chunichi Dragons. He finished the 2019 regular season with a 4–4 record, 3.90 ERA, and 45 strikeouts in 57 2/3 innings. On October 23, he pitched against the Yomiuri Giants as a starting pitcher in the Japan Series, and won the game for the first time in 16 years since the 2003 rookie year.

==== 2020 ====
In the match against the Chiba Lotte Marines on October 27, 2020, Wada pitched as a starting pitcher and became the first winning pitcher in the League Championship in his 18-year career with no runs in 6 innings. The win at the age of 39 became the record for the oldest pitcher in history at NPB. In 2020 season, he finished the regular season with a 8–1 record, 2.94 ERA, and 75 strikeouts in 85.2 innings. In the Japan Series against the Yomiuri Giants, Wada pitched in Game 4 as a starting pitcher and contributed to the team's fourth consecutive Japan Series championship.

==== 2021 ====
On August 19, 2021, Wada was involved in an odd incident in which his glove was stolen and sold for money by a 23-year-old janitor who worked at the PayPay Dome. On the season, Wada pitched to a 4.48 ERA with 83 strikeouts in 18 appearances for the Hawks.

==== 2022 ====
On July 19, 2022, Wada broke Tadashi Sugiura's record for most strikeouts (1,756) by a Hawks pitcher. He additionally recorded his 150th career win in NPB against the Tohoku Rakuten Golden Eagles on September 30. Wada finished the regular season with a 7–4 record, 2.78 ERA, and 75 strikeouts in 81 innings.

==== 2023 ====
On April 5, 2023, Wada became the oldest pitcher in club history to record a win at 42 years and 1 month, breaking the previous record held by Yutaro Imai in 1991 (41 years and 9 months). On July 19, Wada participated the All-Star Game for the 6th time in MyNavi All-Star Game 2023. His age of 42 years and 4 months set a new Pacific League record for the oldest player to play. He finished the regular season with 21 games pitched, an 8–6 record, a 3.24 ERA, and 86 strikeouts in 100 innings.

==== 2024 ====
Wada was troubled by injuries as he went 2–2 throwing in eight games. He was back pitching as a reliever toward the end of the regular season before suffering a left leg injury that ruled him out of the postseason. He announced his retirement on November 5. At the time of his retirement, he was the last active player to have played for the Fukuoka Daiei Hawks.

== Pitching style ==
Wada is a 5 ft 11 in, 180 lb, left-handed pitcher with an unorthodox delivery, throwing from an overhand arm slot but deceiving hitters by keeping his throwing arm back and delaying its swing as he drives to the plate with his lower body.

Wada's four-seam fastball has good late life but decidedly below-average velocity, topping out at 92 mph and usually sitting at 88-89 mph. He compensates for this with his deceptive arm swing and late release point, complementing it with a solid-average slider, an occasional curveball, and a changeup.

While Wada has good command of his pitches overall, recording a career walks per nine innings rate of 2.46 (until 2011 season), he has established somewhat of a reputation as a pitcher who is prone to throwing mistake pitches and giving up a large number of home runs. However, he had shown marked improvement in this area since making his professional debut, giving up progressively fewer homers in every season of his career except for 2005.
