= Brian Falkenborg =

American baseball player (born 1978)

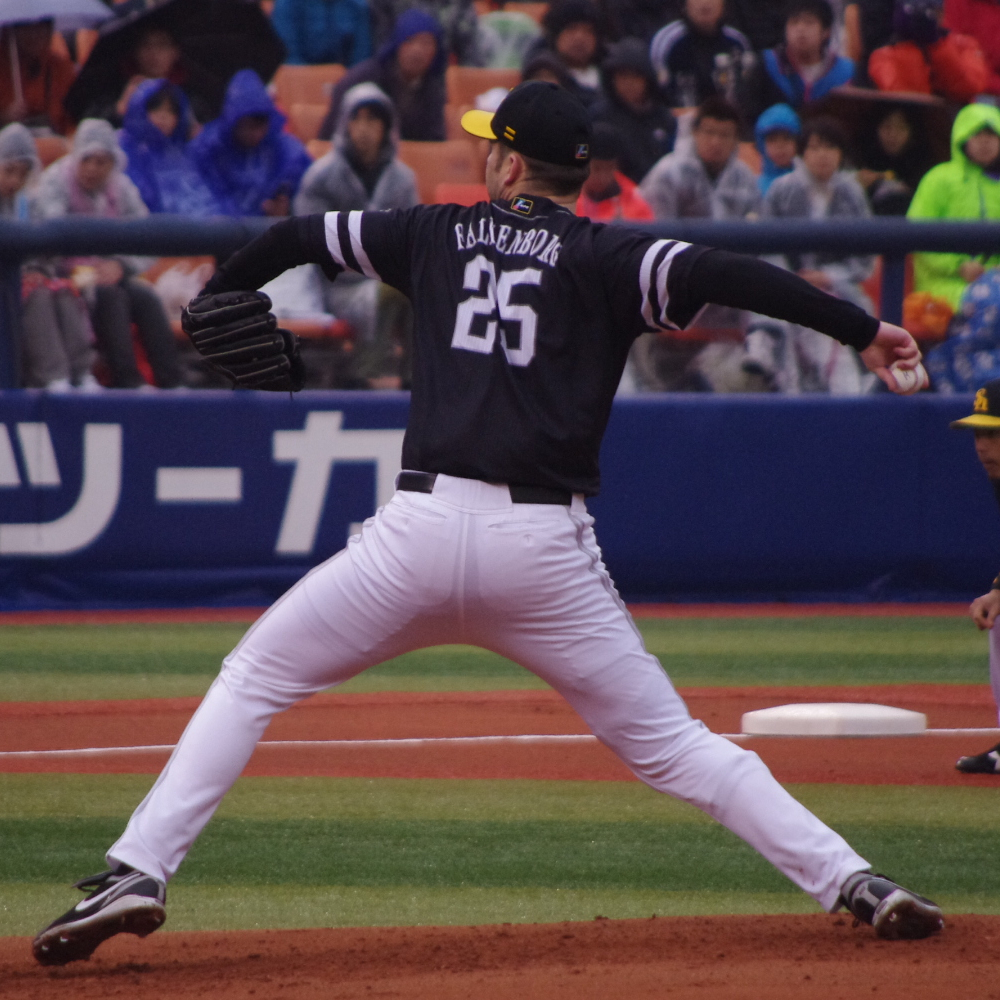
- Pitcher
- Born: January 18, 1978 (age 48); Newport Beach, California, U.S.
- Batted: Right Threw: Right

Professional debut
- MLB: October 1, 1999, for the Baltimore Orioles
- NPB: April 4, 2009, for the Fukuoka SoftBank Hawks

Last appearance
- MLB: September 5, 2008, for the San Diego Padres
- NPB: October 7, 2014, for the Tohoku Rakuten Golden Eagles

MLB statistics
- Win–loss record: 3–5
- Earned run average: 5.59
- Strikeouts: 62

NPB statistics
- Win–loss record: 13–14
- Earned run average: 1.70
- Strikeouts: 344
- Saves: 64
- Stats at Baseball Reference

Teams
- Baltimore Orioles (1999); Los Angeles Dodgers (2004); San Diego Padres (2005); St. Louis Cardinals (2006–2007); Los Angeles Dodgers (2008); San Diego Padres (2008); Fukuoka SoftBank Hawks (2009–2013); Tohoku Rakuten Golden Eagles (2014)

Career highlights and awards
- NPB: 2× NPB All-Star (2009, 2010); Pacific League Most Valuable Setup Pitcher (2010); Japan Series champion (2011)

Brian Thomas Falkenborg (born January 18, 1978) is a former professional baseball relief pitcher. He played in Major League Baseball (MLB) for the Baltimore Orioles, Los Angeles Dodgers, San Diego Padres, and St. Louis Cardinals. Internationally, he played in Nippon Professional Baseball (NPB) for the Fukuoka SoftBank Hawks and Tohoku Rakuten Golden Eagles.

== Career ==
Falkenborg graduated from Redmond High School. He was 6-2 with a 0.75 ERA and 75 strikeouts as a senior at Redmond.He was selected by the Baltimore Orioles in the second round of the 1996 MLB draft and signed with the Orioles on July 6, 1996.

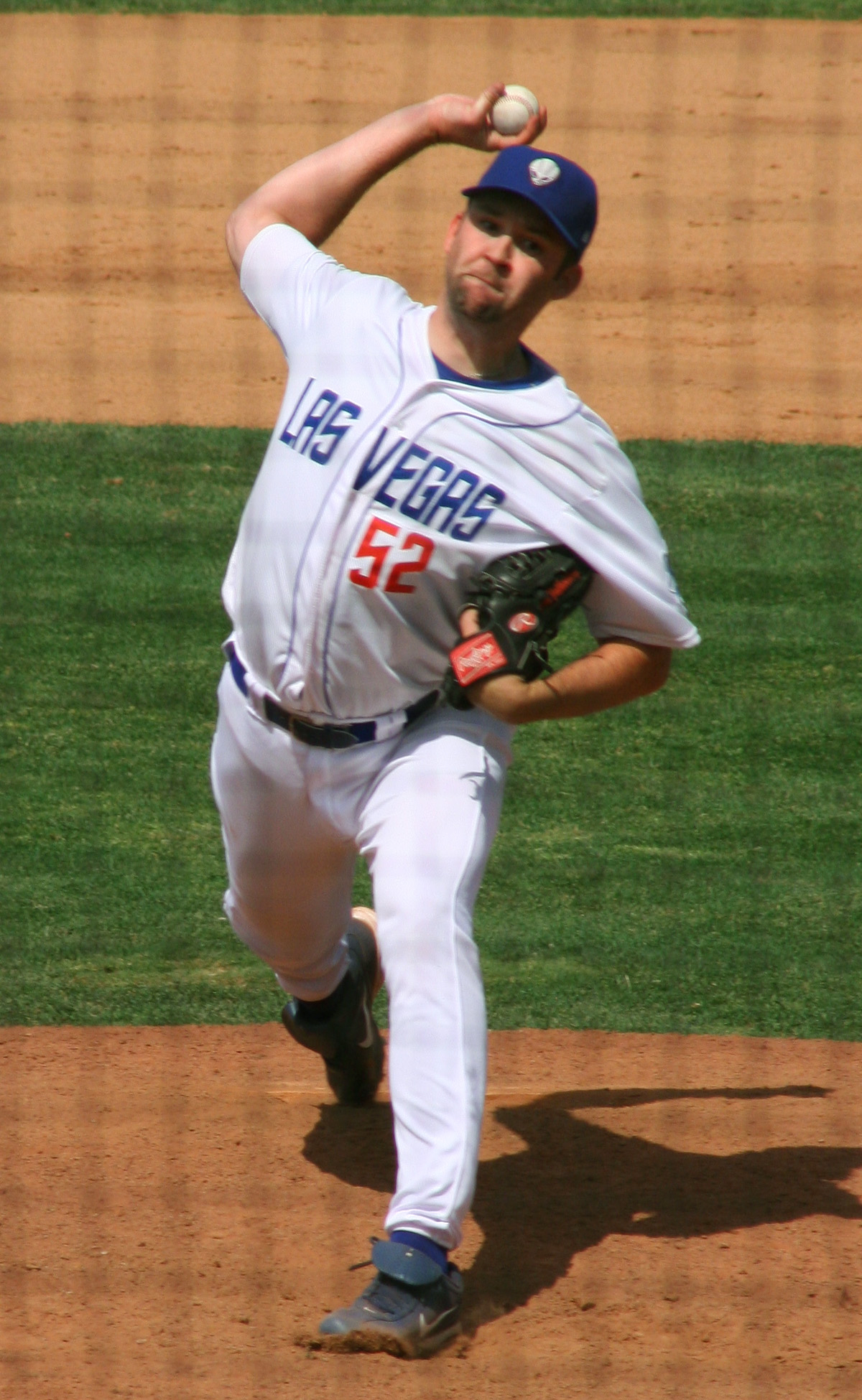
Falkenborg pitching for the Las Vegas 51s, Triple-A affiliates of the Los Angeles Dodgers, in 2008

He began his professional career with the GCL Orioles in the Rookie level Gulf Coast League in 1996. He also pitched in one game for the Single-A High Desert Mavericks that season.

Falkenborg spent most of 1997 with the Single-A Delmarva Shorebirds, 1998 with the High-A Frederick Keys and 1999 with the Double-A Bowie Baysox.

He made his major league debut for the Orioles on October 1, 1999, pitching two scoreless innings of relief against the Boston Red Sox.

He underwent Tommy John surgery in the off-season and missed the entire 2000 season. Falkenborg was signed as a free agent by the Seattle Mariners and spent the 2001 season with the Mariners minor league affiliates at San Antonio and Tacoma. He stayed with Tacoma through the 2003 season, despite battling an assortment of injuries that led to him spending significant time on the disabled list.

Falkenborg signed with the Los Angeles Dodgers for the 2004 season, but spent most of the year with the Triple-A Las Vegas 51s, appearing in only six major league games for the Dodgers, working 14.1 innings and finishing with a 7.53 ERA. He did record his first major league victory on May 9, 2004, in a 14 inning game against the Pittsburgh Pirates.

He spent the 2005 season with the San Diego Padres organization, appearing in 10 games for the Padres, and finishing with an 8.18 ERA. The bulk of his season was spent with the Triple-A Portland Beavers.

Falkenborg pitched in 21 games for the St. Louis Cardinals between 2006 and 2007, though, again, spending most of those seasons in the minors with the Memphis Redbirds. He was released by the Cardinals on November 20, 2007, and, on December 12, 2007, signed a minor league contract with an invitation to spring training with the Dodgers. He failed to make the Dodgers roster out of spring training and was assigned to the Las Vegas 51s, eventually joining the Dodgers major league roster on June 25. He was designated for assignment on August 8. He was claimed off outright waivers by the San Diego Padres on August 13.

== SoftBank Hawks ==
In November 2008, Falkenborg signed with the Fukuoka SoftBank Hawks of Nippon Professional Baseball.

Used as a set-up man with the Hawks in his first season, Falkenborg performed well above expectations in the 2009 season. He did not allow one earned run in spring training and that streak extended until the last week of May. Teaming with rookie set-up man Tadashi Settsu and closer Takahiro Mahara, the tall righty finished second in the Pacific League in holds behind Settsu. The trio was nicknamed "SBM", (short for Settsu, Brian, Mahara), and Falkenborg was named to the Pacific League All-Star Team.

Falkenborg ran into some trouble late in the season as he came down with elbow tightness in August. He was taken off the active roster twice, once for the injury, and again in late September to shut him down for the season as he was having trouble recovering for the injury. He had also been taken off the active roster earlier in the season due to the birth of his second child. Still, Falkenborg finished with a 6-0 record, one save, and a 1.74 ERA to go with 61 strikeouts in 51 and 2/3 innings.

He was even better in the 2010 regular season. Used as the 8th inning reliever behind Settsu, Falkenborg gave up one run in his fifth appearance of the season against the Tohoku Rakuten Golden Eagles on April 3. From there, he began a streak of 19 straight appearances without giving up an earned run, a streak that ended on May 29 against the Chunichi Dragons. After that, he went two months without giving up an earned run before melting down in two consecutive appearances against the Saitama Seibu Lions and Orix Buffaloes. Still, Falkenborg finished with a record of 3-2 with one save and a 1.02 ERA. However, he was not as good in the playoffs, as he gave up five earned runs in just two innings of work for a 22.50 ERA. Despite this, he was signed to a 2-year contract extension by the Hawks.

Falkenborg rebounded from the bad postseason to have another great season in a Hawks uniform. Falkenborg took on the role of closer when regular closer Mahara missed most of the season due to the death of his mother, mechanical problems, and injury. He was 1-2 with a 1.42 ERA in 47 and 1/3 innings (50 appearances), and he also recorded 19 saves, tying for the club lead with Mahara, who returned at the end of the season. The big American also vanquished his playoff demons as he pitched in six total playoff games, giving up one run in seven and 1/3 innings, with two walks and 11 strikeouts. He made five appearances in the 2011 Japan Series against the Chunichi Dragons, giving up no runs and striking out 10.
