= Toshiya Sugiuchi =

Japanese baseball player (born 1980)

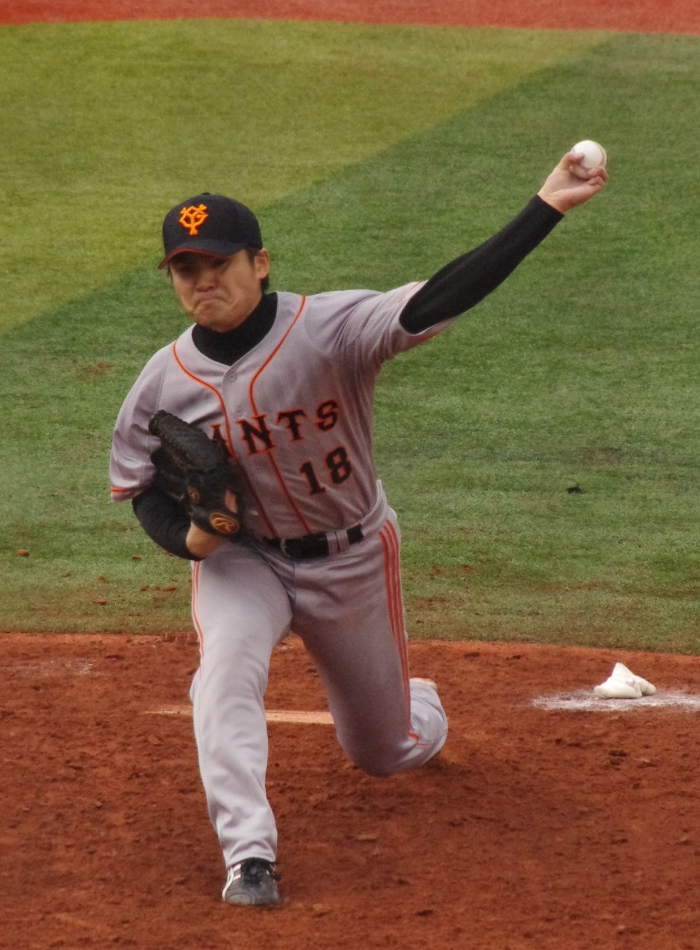
- Sugiuchi with the Yomiuri Giants

Yomiuri Giants – No. 101
- Starting pitcher / Coach
- Born: October 30, 1980 (age 45); Kasuga, Fukuoka, Japan
- Bats: Left Throws: Left

NPB debut
- April 1, 2002, for the Fukuoka Daiei Hawks

NPB statistics
- Win–loss: 142–77
- Earned run average: 2.95
- Strikeouts: 2,156
- Stats at Baseball Reference

Teams
- As player: Fukuoka Daiei Hawks / Fukuoka SoftBank Hawks (2002–2011); Yomiuri Giants (2012–2018); As coach: Yomiuri Giants (2019–present)

Career highlights and awards
- 3× Japan Series Champion (2003, 2011, 2012); 2003 Japan Series Most Valuable Player; 2005 Pacific League MVP; 2005 Eiji Sawamura Award; 2005 Best Nine Award; 2005 Pacific League Win Champion; 2005 Pacific League ERA Champion; 3× NPB Strikeout Champion (2008, 2009, 2012); 7× NPB All-Star (2005, 2007–2012)
Medals
Representing Japan
Men's Baseball
World Baseball Classic
Gold medal – first place	2006 San Diego	Team
Gold medal – first place	2009 Los Angeles	Team

Toshiya Sugiuchi (杉内 俊哉, Sugiuchi Toshiya; born October 30, 1980 in Kasuga, Fukuoka, Japan) is a Japanese baseball player. He is a left-handed starting pitcher for the Yomiuri Giants.

Sugiuchi was the Eiji Sawamura Award winner in 2005. He has had some of the most international experience of any active Japanese baseball player, pitching in the 2000 Sydney and 2008 Beijing Olympics as well as the 2006 and 2009 World Baseball Classics.

== Early life ==
Suiguchi was born in Kasuga, and raised in Ōnojō, Fukuoka. He began playing baseball in the fourth grade for the Onojo Little League baseball club while attending Onojo Municipal Elementary School as an outfielder, being converted to first base the following year. He became a pitcher in the sixth grade, leading his team to the Round of 16 in the national tournament as their ace. He led the city's Onojo Guts to the finals of the national junior tournament while at Ōno Municipal Junior High School.

Sugiuchi went on to enroll at Kagoshima Jitsugyo High School, playing in the National High School Baseball Invitational Tournament and National High School Baseball Championship (the two most prominent national tournaments in Japan, both held at Koshien Stadium) a total of three times. In the summer of 1998, then-senior Sugiuchi matched up with Sendai Senior High School ace Hiroshi Kisanuki (currently with the Yomiuri Giants), a highly touted draft prospect, in the finals of the Kagoshima Tournament, defeating the school 3–1 and earning a berth in the national championship.

Sugiuchi attracted national attention when he threw a 16-strikeout no-hitter in Kagoshima Jitsugyo's first game of the 80th National High School Baseball Championship against Hachinohe Institute of Technology First High School. His success was short-lived, however, as Kagoshima Jitsugyo matched up with powerhouse Yokohama Senior High School (the East Kanagawa champions) in the second round. Yokohama Senior High's lineup, stocked with star players—the likes of Daisuke Matsuzaka, Taketoshi Gotoh, Masaaki Koike and Yoshio Koyama—teed off on Sugiuchi's curveball, touching him up for six runs in eight innings (Matsuzaka hit a home run).

While it was rumored that several NPB teams were considering picking him in the 1998 NPB amateur draft, Sugiuchi decided against declaring for the draft when his high school coach advised him that he would likely go no higher than the fourth round, instead opting to join an industrial league (a collection of amateur teams, each consisting wholly of employees of the owner corporation) team. He initially received an offer from JR Kyushu (Kyushu Railway Company) but eventually went on to join Mitsubishi Heavy Industries–Nagasaki.

As a player who was born in the 1980 Japanese academic year and participated in the 1998 Summer High School Baseball Championship, Sugiuchi is considered a member of the "Matsuzaka Generation".

== Industrial league career ==
Following an unspectacular first year in the industrial leagues, Sugiuchi and teammate and right-hander Takayuki Goto led Mitsubishi Heavy Industries-Nagasaki to a berth in the Intercity Baseball Tournament in 2000, but the team was knocked out in the quarter-finals against Mitsubishi Motors Kawasaki (currently Mitsubishi Fuso Kawasaki) when Sugiuchi gave up back-to-back home runs, the first a game-tying three-run shot and the second a solo arch.

Nevertheless, Sugiuchi was named to the Japanese national team to play in the upcoming 2000 Sydney Olympics following the tournament (Japan finished fourth).

Mitsubishi Heavy Industries-Nagasaki earned a berth in the Industrial League All-Japan Baseball Championship in 2001. Sugiuchi held Nissan Motors to one run over eight innings in the semi-finals, and his team went on to win their first tournament title.

Suiguchi spent a total of three years in the industrial leagues, pitching despite recurring shoulder issues and working on his fastball velocity until it clocked 149 km/h (93 mph) (his fastball had hovered around 135 to 140 km/h (84 to 87 mph) in high school). The Fukuoka Daiei Hawks (currently the Fukuoka SoftBank Hawks) selected Sugiuchi in the third round of the 2001 NPB amateur draft held that fall, presenting him with the uniform number 47, the same number as former Hawks left-hander Kimiyasu Kudo. (Sugiuchi had idolized Kudo as a child.)

== Professional career ==
=== Early years: 2002–2004 ===
Sugiuchi finished with just two wins in his rookie season (2002) in the pros. During the off-season, he made up his mind to abandon the windup and pitch exclusively from the stretch, a decision that led to a breakout sophomore campaign in which he put up 10 wins as a member of the starting rotation alongside rookies Tsuyoshi Wada and Nagisa Arakaki. Following the Hawks' league title, Sugiuchi started two games in the 2003 Japan Series, winning both starts and being named the Japan Series Most Valuable Player. He married reporter Erika Ueba during the off-season.

Coming off of a season in which he went 10–8 with a 3.38 ERA and 169 strikeouts, Sugiuchi struggled to live up to expectations to begin the 2004. On June 1, he gave up seven runs in the first two innings in a regular-season start against the Chiba Lotte Marines, slamming both of his fists into the dugout bench in frustration and breaking the fifth metacarpal bone on both hands. He immediately underwent surgery at a hospital, where it was said that he would be sidelined for three months. The Hawks organization fined Sugiuchi 1 million yen for "conduct unbecoming of a professional baseball pitcher".

=== 2005 ===
Sugiuchi rebounded in the 2005 season, winning the Pacific League MVP award for the months of April and May and racking up his first 10 wins at the fastest pace of his career. He finished the season with an 18–4 record, a 2.11 ERA, 218 strikeouts and 43 walks (a strikeout-to-walk ratio of 5.07), leading the league in wins and ERA and becoming the fourth pitcher in Hawks franchise history to record 200 or more strikeouts in a single season. He also beat out teammate and resident staff ace Kazumi Saito, who had a stellar season himself with a 16–1 record and a 2.92 ERA, in being voted to the Eiji Sawamura and league Most Valuable Player awards. He also went the entire season without recording a hit-batter, wild pitch, balk, or error.

=== 2006 ===
In 2006, Sugiuchi was named to the Japanese national team to play in the inaugural World Baseball Classic. However, he went 0–1 in two appearances with a 5.40 ERA, being charged with the loss in Japan's second-round match against South Korea. He began strong but struggled as the season went on, putting up just 7 wins (5 losses) with a 3.53 ERA in 132 2/3 innings. He took the mound in the Hawks' first game of the second stage of the Pacific League playoffs, but left the game after giving up two runs in the first three innings and was charged with the loss.

=== 2007 ===
Sugiuchi had another comeback year in 2007, continuing his peculiar tradition of having a good season every other year. He became the Hawks' de facto ace and went 15–6 with a 2.46 ERA, striking out 187 (the second-highest total of his career) in a career-high 197 2/3 innings with five complete games and three shutouts. His presence was much-needed after an injury to the team's ace, Kazumi Saito. From April 25 until August 4, Sugiuchi recorded quality starts in 15 of the 16 starts he made, with five complete games and two shutouts. He would not go longer than seven innings for the rest of the season, but did record a Game 2 victory against the Chiba Lotte Marines in the first stage of the Pacific League Climax Series to force a decisive Game 3.

=== 2008 ===
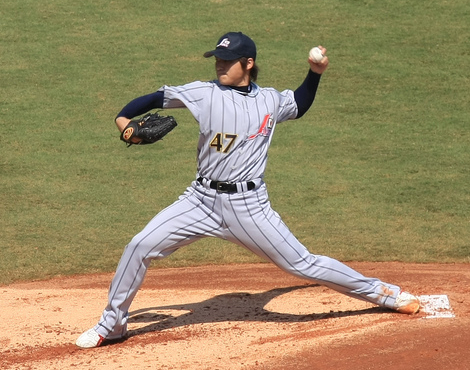
Sugiuchi pitching for Japan in the 2008 Summer Olympics.

Sugiuchi put up another solid season in 2008, going just 10–8 (partly due to the time he missed while pitching for the national team in the 2008 Beijing Olympics) but striking out a league-leading 213 with a 2.66 ERA while anchoring a rotation that was short Saito and Wada for much of the season. It marked the first time in his seven-year career that he had recorded double-digit wins or thrown more than 140 innings in consecutive seasons.

On October 7, the Hawks sent Sugiuchi to the mound in their regular-season game against the Tohoku Rakuten Golden Eagles in the hopes of avoiding a last-place finish in the pennant race. He and young Eagles hurler Masahiro Tanaka both threw nine shutout innings, sending the game to extra-innings, but the Eagles won in twelve innings. The Hawks finished the season with the worst record in the league for the first time since 1996.

=== 2009 ===
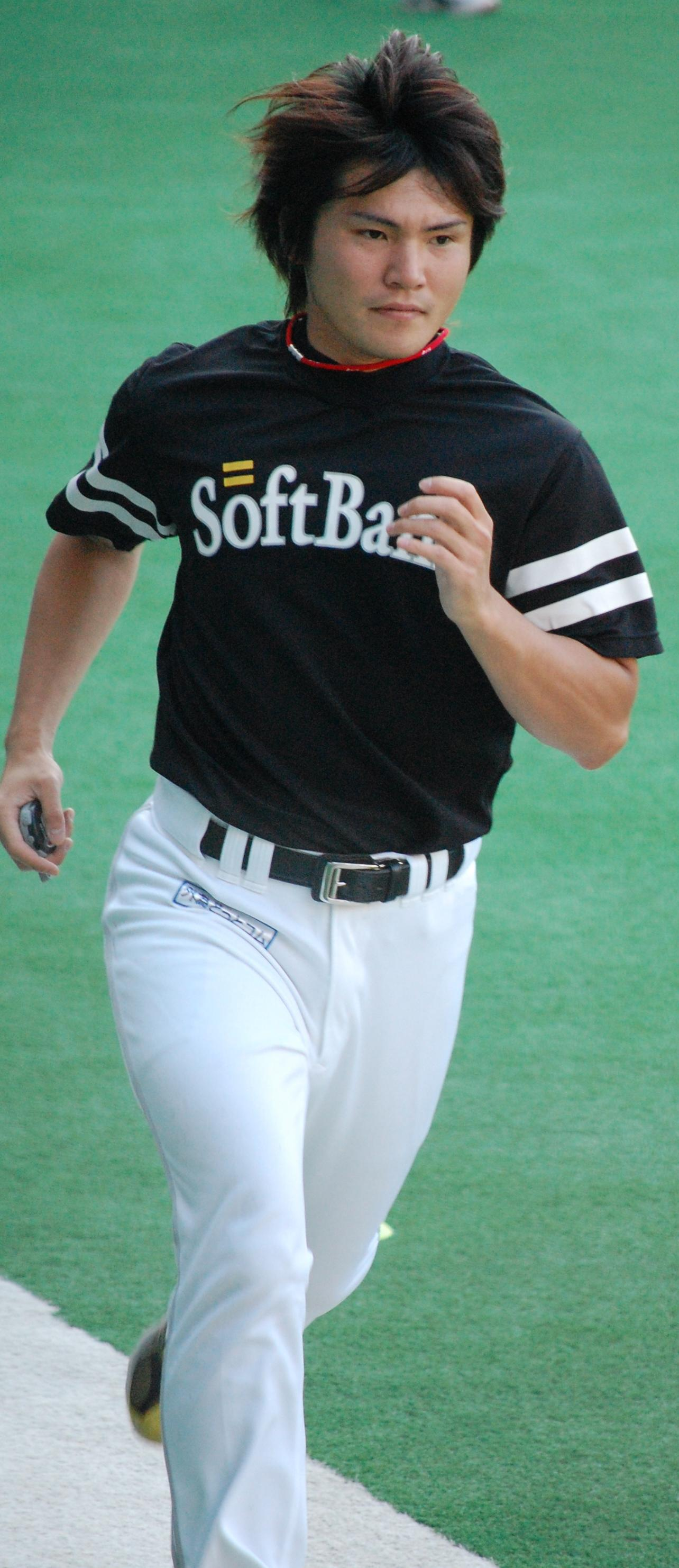
Sugiuchi during his tenure with the Fukuoka SoftBank Hawks in 2009

In 2009, Sugiuchi was selected to the national team to play in the second World Baseball Classic, his fourth time playing in major international competition. He was used solely as a reliever, pitching 6 1/3 hitless innings in five appearances. He came on to replace Eagles ace Hisashi Iwakuma in the second match against Cuba in the second round, throwing three shutout innings and being credited with a save. He was also used as a left-handed specialist in the tournament finals against South Korea.

On April 5, in his first start of the regular season against the Orix Buffaloes, Sugiuchi struck out five over 7 2/3 innings to bring his career strikeout total to 1003. He was the fourth-fastest pitcher in NPB history to amass 1,000 career strikeouts (following Hideo Nomo, Kazuhisa Ishii and Yutaka Enatsu), doing so in 979 1/3 innings. He became the 318th pitcher in Japanese professional baseball to amass 1000 career innings in a start against the Eagles on April 26, but gave up four runs (three earned) over seven innings en route to his first loss of the season. He had a strong outing on May 10 against the Saitama Seibu Lions, striking out 12 over eight innings and allowing just one run and improving his record to 11–0 in the month of May since 2007.

=== 2010 ===
Starting off the 2010 campaign as the Opening Day Starter once again, Sugiuchi recorded a quality start against the Hokkaido Nippon Ham Fighters and got the win over Nippon Ham super-ace, Yu Darvish. Sugiuchi continued his winning ways, but was not as dominant as he had been in the past. Always a bit of a slow starter, he put together a fairly good April, recording a complete-game shutout of the Fighters on the 9th, and he also struck out at least nine batters in all of his starts during the month. However, in his first and last starts of the month, Sugiuchi gave up five runs. Despite having a rough start on May 16, an interleague game against the Tokyo Yakult Swallows, he still remained undefeated in the month, running his record to 13–0 since '07.

Sugiuchi's troubles came to a head with a loss on June 20 against the Saitama Seibu Lions. In that game, he was hit for six runs on seven hits with four walks and four strikeouts in just three innings. It was his shortest start in the regular season since August 20, 2007. Since then, he has recorded quality starts in each of his past four starts, with two complete games against Nippon Ham (a second complete-game shutout) and Seibu. He also started the second game of the 2010 All-Star Series, following the lead of his teammate, Tsuyoshi Wada, who started Game 1.

As 2010 started its Pacific League's end of season race between the Hawks, Lions and Marines, Sugiuchi hit a minor slump just as his team needed him most. Between August 21 and September 18, he had 4 winless games (2 losts, 2 no results). His next game on Sept 25 was at Sapporo against the Fighters, and was the Hawks last second game of the regular season. The Hawks needed a win to maintain their lead in the league against Lions. He faced off against Fighters' ace Darvish and both pitchers went the whole nine innings. In the end, Sugiuchi prevailed as Darvish gave up one run and he gave up none while striking out nine Fighters. A much relieved Sugiuchi then famously broke down in tears at the Hero's interview as he admitted that he finally delivered during the pennant race.

== Pitching style ==
Sugiuchi is a left-handed pitcher with a clean three-quarters delivery that he repeats well from pitch to pitch. Even by Japanese standards, his frame is diminutive; he is listed at just 175 cm (5 ft 9 in) and 82 kg (181 lb). Despite such disadvantage in size, Sugiuchi is a prolific strikeout pitcher, averaging more than a strikeout per inning for his career (9.46 strikeouts per nine innings at the end of 2012 season). He throws a four-seam fastball sitting in 86-89 mph (tops out at 93 mph), complementing it with a solid-average slider, a solid-average changeup, and an occasional curveball.

Sugiuchi is a somewhat unusual pitcher in that he pitches exclusively from the stretch. While he has a relatively slow move to the plate, he has solid command over all of his pitches and is adept at using his glove to hide the ball throughout his delivery.

Sugiuchi has also been dubbed "Mr. May" by the Japanese media for the success he has enjoyed in the month of May during his professional career. He has won Pacific League MVP awards for the month of May three times (2005, 2007, 2008) and is 13–0 in May since the 2007 season.
