= Yuichi Honda =

Japanese baseball player (born 1984)

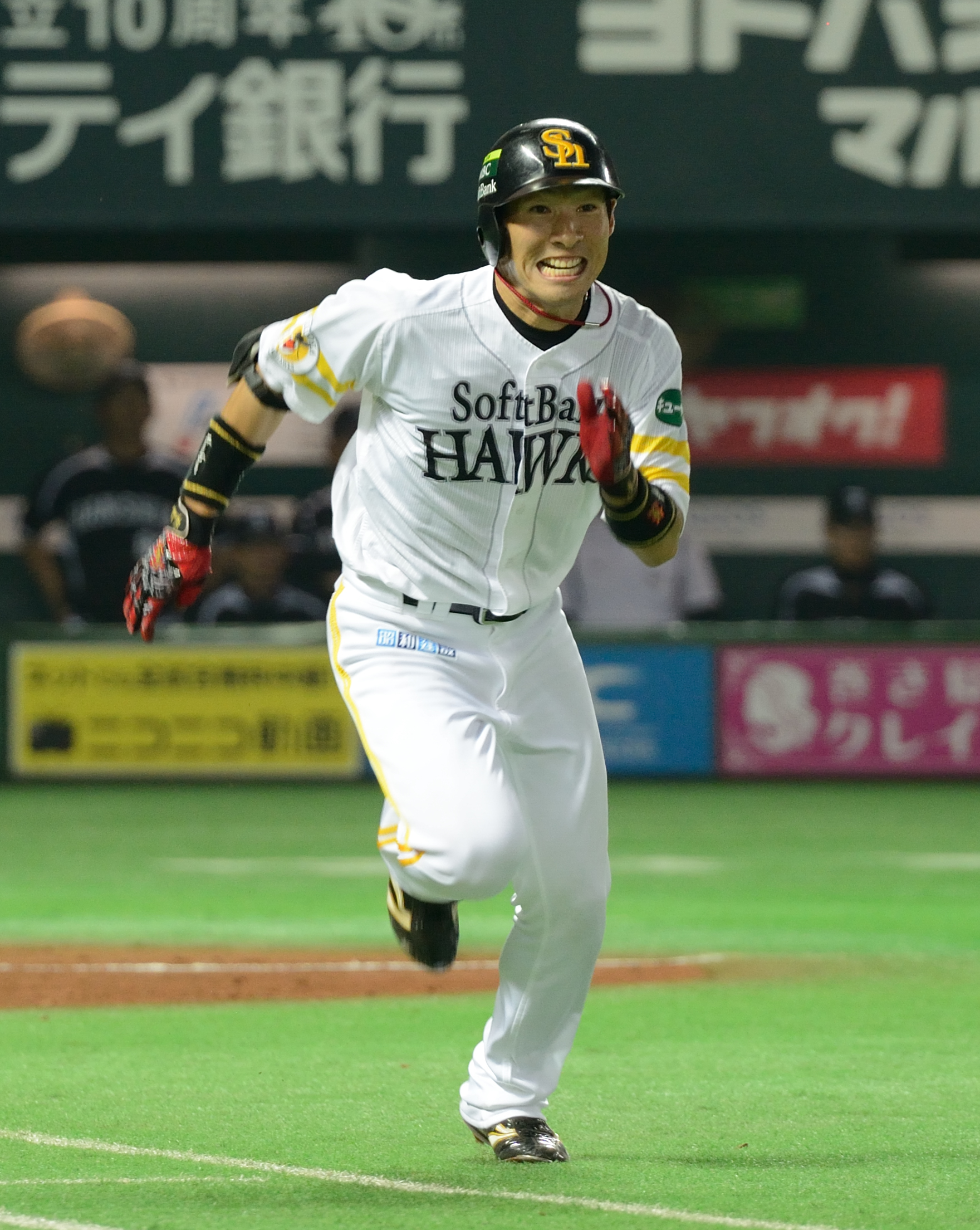
- Honda with the Fukuoka SoftBank Hawks

Fukuoka SoftBank Hawks – No. 80
- Second baseman / Coach
- Born: November 19, 1984 (age 41); Fukuoka, Japan
- Batted: Left Threw: Right

NPB debut
- August 4, 2006, for the Fukuoka SoftBank Hawks

Last NPB appearance
- October 6, 2018, for the Fukuoka SoftBank Hawks

NPB statistics
- Batting average: .276
- Home runs: 15
- Runs batted in: 347
- Hits: 1,289
- Stolen bases: 342
- Stats at Baseball Reference

Teams
- As player: Fukuoka SoftBank Hawks (2006–2018); As coach: Fukuoka SoftBank Hawks (2019–present)

Career highlights and awards
- As player: 2× Pacific League stolen base leader (2010, 2011); Pacific League Best Nine Award (2011); 2× Pacific League Golden Glove Award (2011, 2012); 4× Japan Series Champion (2011, 2014, 2015, 2017); NPB All-Star Game (2011); As coach: Japan Series champion (2025)

Yuichi Honda (本多 雄一, Honda Yūichi; born 19 November 1984, in Onojo, Fukuoka-ken) is a Japanese former professional baseball infielder, and current first squad infield defense and base running coach for the Fukuoka SoftBank Hawks of Nippon Professional Baseball (NPB).

He played in NPB for the Hawks as second baseman from 2006 to 2018, and wore number 46.

== Professional career ==
=== Active player era ===
On October 3, 2005, Honda was drafted fifth round pick by the Fukuoka SoftBank Hawks in the 2005 Nippon Professional Baseball draft.

He became a regular member of the Hawks' second baseman from 2006 season due to his solid defense.

In 2008, he batted .291. From 2006 to 2009 he was .670 on-base plus slugging.

Honda stole bases 59 in the 2010 season and 60 stolen bases in the 2011 season, winning the Pacific League stolen base title for the second consecutive year.

He also won the Pacific League Best Nine Award in the 2011 season and the Pacific League Golden Glove Award for the 2011 and 2012 seasons.

Honda played 13 seasons with the Hawks, appearing in 1,313 games and a batting average of .276, a 15 home runs, a 1,289 hits, a RBI of 347, a 342 stolen bases, and a 243 sacrifice bunts. His 342 stolen bases rank third all-time on the Hawks.

On October 2, 2018, Honda announced his retirement.

=== After retirement ===
On November 11, 2018, Honda was appointed as the first squad infield defense and base running coach of the Fukuoka Softbank Hawks.

He served as the second squad infield defense and base running coach for the 2023 season.

On December 2, 2023, he was transferred to the first squad infield defense and base running coach.

== International career ==
In 2013, Honda was elected to the Japanese national baseball team in the 2013 World Baseball Classic.
