= Akio Mizuta =

Japanese baseball player

- Pitcher
- Born: July 11, 1973 (age 52); Kanan, Osaka, Japan
- Bats: Right Throws: Right

debut
- June 23, 1999, for the Fukuoka Daiei Hawks

Teams
- Fukuoka Daiei Hawks Fukuoka SoftBank Hawks (1999–2010)

Akio Mizuta (水田 章雄, Mizuta Akio; born July 11, 1973) is a Nippon Professional Baseball pitcher for the Fukuoka SoftBank Hawks in Japan's Pacific League.
