= Yasushi Kamiuchi =

Japanese baseball player

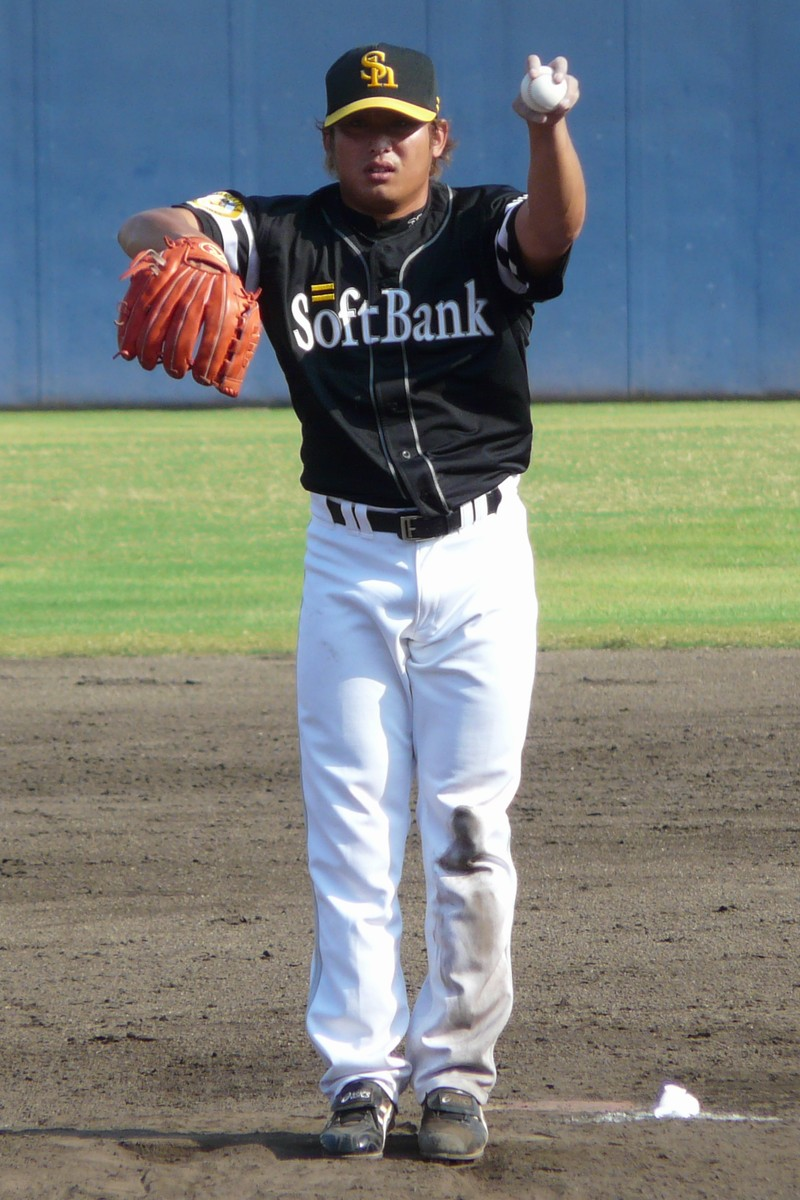
- Pitcher
- Born: August 12, 1983 (age 42); Kyoto, Japan
- Bats: Left Throws: Left

debut
- July 25, 2004, for the Fukuoka Daiei Hawks
- Stats at Baseball Reference

Teams
- Fukuoka Daiei Hawks/Fukuoka SoftBank Hawks (2002–2012); Yokohama DeNA BayStars (2013–2014)

Yasushi Kamiuchi (神内 靖, Kamiuchi Yasushi; born August 12, 1983) is a Japanese Nippon Professional Baseball pitcher with the Yokohama DeNA BayStars in Japan's Central League.
