= Masahiko Morifuku =

Japanese baseball player

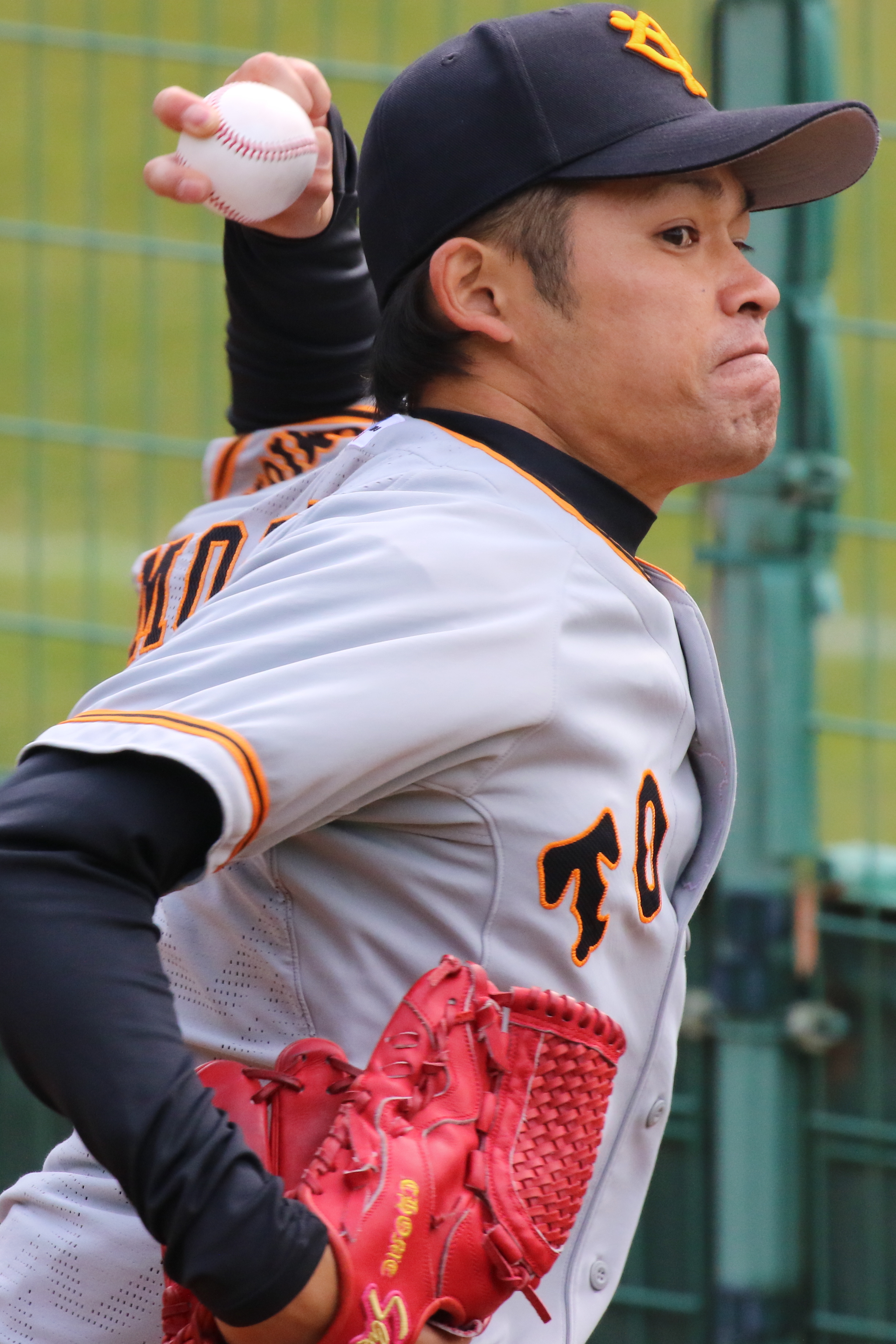
- Morifuku with the Yomiuri Giants
- Pitcher
- Born: July 29, 1986 (age 39); Toyohashi, Aichi, Japan
- Batted: Left Threw: Left

NPB debut
- March 31, 2007, for the Fukuoka SoftBank Hawks

Last appearance
- June 21, 2019, for the Yomiuri Giants

NPB statistics (through 2019 season)
- Win–loss record: 17–17
- ERA: 2.59
- Strikeouts: 326
- Saves: 18
- Holds: 134

Teams
- Fukuoka SoftBank Hawks (2007–2016); Yomiuri Giants (2017–2019)

Career highlights and awards
- 3× Japan Series champion (2011, 2014, 2015); 2× NPB All-Star (2011, 2012)

Masahiko Morifuku (森福 允彦, Morifuku Masahiko; born July 29, 1986 in Toyohashi, Aichi) is a Japanese former professional baseball pitcher. He played for the Fukuoka SoftBank Hawks and Yomiuri Giants of the Nippon Professional Baseball (NPB) from 2007 to 2019.

On December 2, 2019, he become free agent.
