= Masaaki Koike =

Japanese baseball player and coach (born 1980)

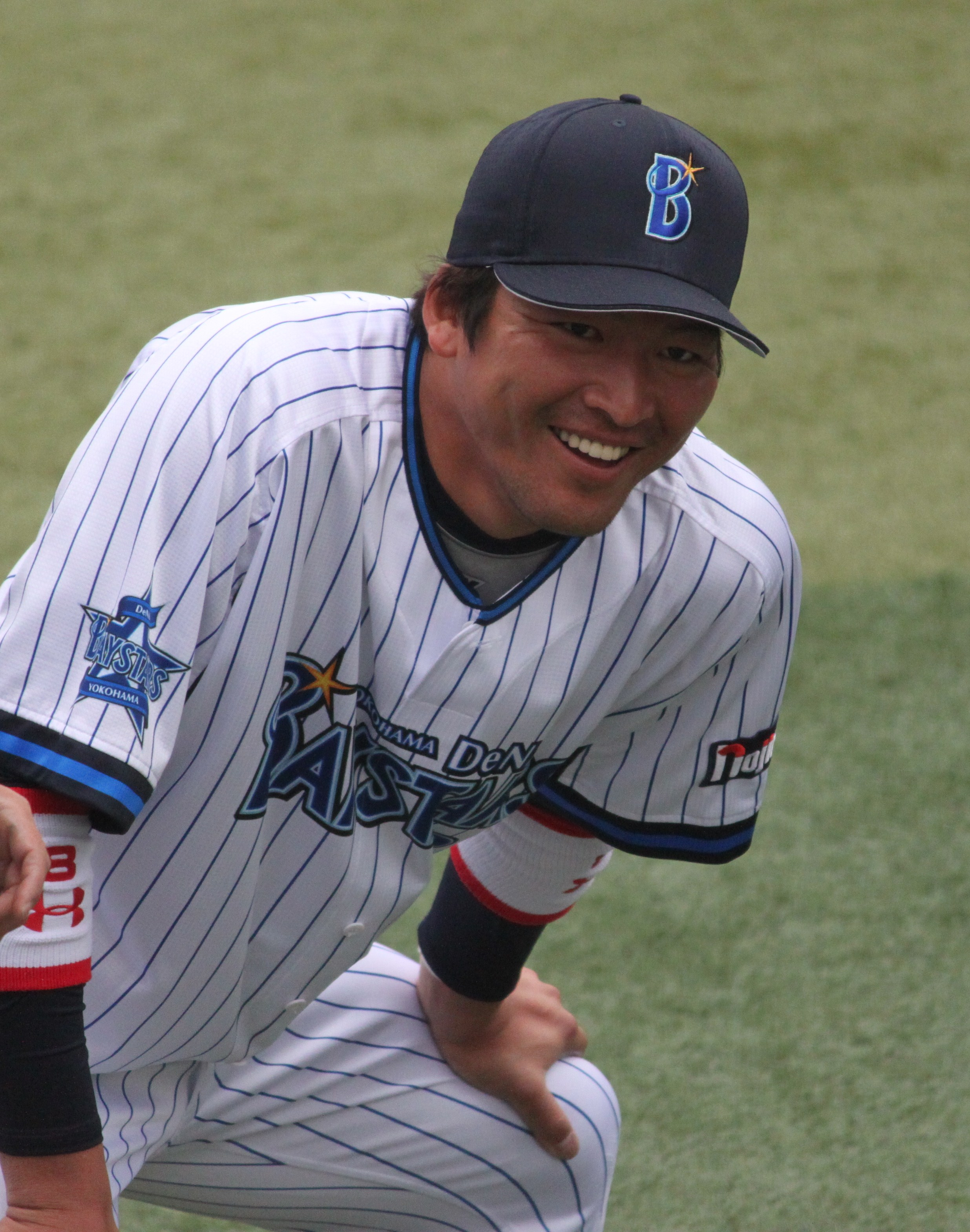

Chunichi Dragons
- Outfielder / Coach
- Born: May 15, 1980 (age 45); Yokohama, Kanagawa, Japan
- Batted: Right Threw: Right

NPB debut
- April 20, 2001, for the Yokohama BayStars

Last NPB appearance
- October 8, 2013, for the Yokohama DeNA BayStars

NPB statistics (through 2013)
- Batting average: .243
- Hits: 415
- Home runs: 55
- RBI: 189
- Stolen bases: 6
- Stats at Baseball Reference

Teams
- As player: Yokohama BayStars/Yokohama DeNA BayStars (1999–2008, 2012–2013); Chunichi Dragons (2008–2011); As coach: Yokohama DeNA BayStars (2014–2024); Chunichi Dragons (2025-Present)

Masaaki Koike (小池 正晃, Koike Masaaki; born April 20, 1980 in Yokohama, Kanagawa, Japan) is a professional Japanese baseball player.

Koike played outfield and infield for the Chunichi Dragons (2008–2011) and for the Yokohama DeNA BayStars (2012–2013). Koike announced his retirement on October 1, 2013 and his final at-bat, hit a home run.

In 2014, the Yokohama DeNA BayStars hired Koike as first team batting coach. On 6 November 2024, it was confirmed Koike had accepted an offer to become a hitting coach for the Chunichi Dragons.
