= Yoshiaki Fujioka =

Japanese baseball player

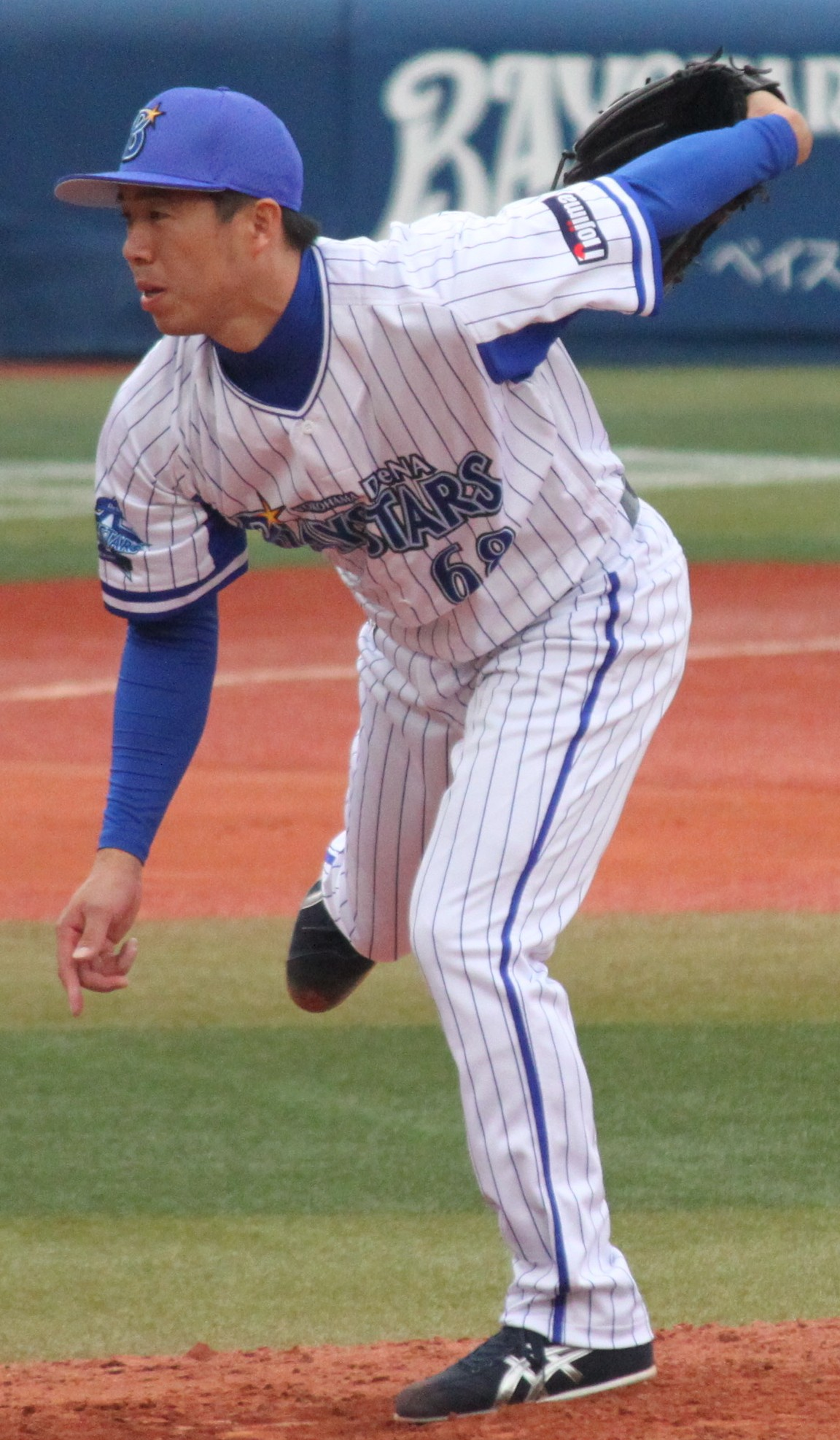
- Fujioka with the Yokohama DeNA BayStars

Yokohama DeNA BayStars – No. 80
- Pitcher / Coach
- Born: March 12, 1985 (age 41); Toyonaka, Osaka, Japan
- Batted: Left Threw: Right

NPB debut
- March 26, 2006, for the Fukuoka SoftBank Hawks

Last NPB appearance
- August 15, 2020, for the Yokohama DeNA BayStars

Career statistics
- Win–loss record: 22–16
- Earned run average: 3.78
- Strikeouts: 342
- Holds: 57
- Saves: 1
- Stats at Baseball Reference

Teams
- As player: Fukuoka SoftBank Hawks (2006–2013); Hokkaido Nippon-Ham Fighters (2014–2016); Yokohama DeNA BayStars (2016–2020); Hinokuni Salamanders (2022–2023); Kufu HAYATE Ventures Shizuoka (2024, 2025); As coach: Yokohama DeNA BayStars (2021, 2026–present); Hinokuni Salamanders (2022–2023); Kufu HAYATE Ventures Shizuoka (2025)

Yoshiaki Fujioka (藤岡 好明, Fujioka Yoshiaki; born March 12, 1985 in Toyonaka, Osaka, Japan) is a Japanese former professional baseball pitcher who is currently a pitching coach for the Yokohama DeNA BayStars of Nippon Professional Baseball (NPB). He has played in Nippon Professional Baseball (NPB) for the Fukuoka SoftBank Hawks, Hokkaido Nippon-Ham Fighters and BayStars.

== Career ==
Fukuoka SoftBank Hawks selected Fujioka with the third selection in the 2005 NPB draft.

On March 26, 2006, Fujioka made his NPB debut.

On November 28, 2020, Fujioka announced his retirement and became pitching coach for the BayStars.
