= D. J. Houlton =

American baseball player (born 1979)

D.J. Houlton
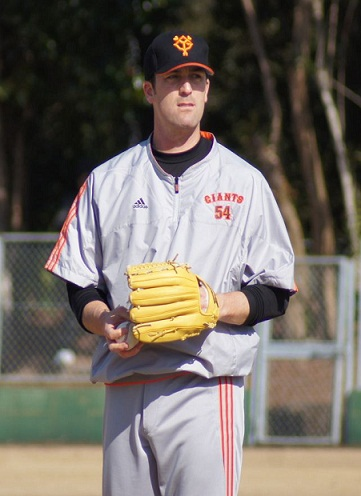
- Pitcher
- Born: August 12, 1979 (age 46); Fullerton, California, U.S.
- Batted: Right Threw: Right

Professional debut
- MLB: April 9, 2005, for the Los Angeles Dodgers
- NPB: 2008, for the Fukuoka SoftBank Hawks
- KBO: March 29, 2014, for the Kia Tigers

Last appearance
- MLB: September 30, 2007, for the Los Angeles Dodgers
- NPB: October 3, 2013, for the Yomiuri Giants
- KBO: July 23, 2014, for the Kia Tigers

MLB statistics
- Win–loss record: 6–11
- Earned run average: 4.99
- Strikeouts: 111

NPB statistics
- Win–loss record: 63–39
- Earned run average: 3.20
- Strikeouts: 613

KBO statistics
- Win–loss record: 5–8
- Earned run average: 4.80
- Strikeouts: 58
- Stats at Baseball Reference

Teams
- Los Angeles Dodgers (2005, 2007); Fukuoka SoftBank Hawks (2008–2011); Yomiuri Giants (2012–2013); Kia Tigers (2014)

Career highlights and awards
- 2x Japan Series champion (2011, 2012); Fukuoka SoftBank Hawks Most wins 19 (2011)

Dennis Sean "D. J." Houlton Jr. (born August 12, 1979) is an American former professional baseball pitcher. He played in Major League Baseball for the Los Angeles Dodgers and in Nippon Professional Baseball for the Fukuoka SoftBank Hawks and Yomiuri Giants and in the KBO League for the Kia Tigers.

== Career ==
=== Amateur ===
Houlton attended Servite High School and the University of the Pacific. On May 11, 2001, while at Pacific, Houlton pitched a complete game no hitter with an 8–0 victory over UC Riverside.

=== Houston Astros ===
In the 2001 MLB draft, the Houston Astros drafted Houlton in the 11th round. He signed on June 9, 2001.

In 2001–2002, he pitched for the Michigan Battle Cats, the Astros Single-A team, going 14–5 with a 3.15 ERA in 35 games (16 starts). In 2003 and 2004, he pitched primarily for the then Double-A Round Rock Express in the Texas League, where he went 12–5 with a 2.94 ERA in 28 starts with 3 complete games.

=== Los Angeles Dodgers ===
On December 13, 2004, the Los Angeles Dodgers acquired Houlton from the Astros in the Rule 5 draft. Houlton spent the entire 2005 season in the Major Leagues, going 6–9 with a 5.16 ERA in 35 appearances (19 starts).

As one of the players brought to the team by General Manager Paul DePodesta and then Manager Jim Tracy, Houlton's fortunes faded when a new management team took over the Dodgers prior to the 2006 season. He failed to make the major league team out of spring training and spent the year with the Las Vegas 51s in AAA.

In 2006, Houlton struggled in the minor leagues, going 9–11 with a 5.60 ERA at Las Vegas and did not get called up. In 2007, going 5–4 with a 3.90 ERA over the first half of the season, Houlton was called up to the Dodgers on July 1, 2007. Houlton ended up at 0–2 with a 4.18 ERA in twenty-eight innings with the Dodgers.

In January 2008, the Dodgers sold Houlton's contract to the Fukuoka SoftBank Hawks of the Japanese Pacific League.

=== Nippon Professional Baseball ===
Houlton did not have a set role in his first season with the Hawks, as he started the season in the bullpen as the team's set-up man. Assigned the number #00, Houlton eventually became the team's closer in the absence of the team's ace closer Takahiro Mahara. Until the end of May, Houlton was regularly able to close games, many times getting six-out saves. However, after blowing three straight saves at the end of May and beginning of June (all in Interleague play), Houlton was demoted to ni-gun. He was recalled in July as a starter, and stayed in that role the rest of the season. He recorded six quality starts, while going seven or more innings four times. In the 2008 season, Houlton went 4–7 with 6 saves and a 4.27 ERA in 28 games (11 starts).

Reassigned with the number #54 in 2009 and being pegged a starter from the outset as Mahara was finally healthy, Houlton was able to settle into a role early on, a luxury he did not have the previous season. He responded immediately, giving the Hawks quality starts in each of his first eleven starts and posting a 5–3 record with a 2.13 ERA in that span. Houlton was able to maintain this torrid pace, as he went less than five innings only once during the season. He finished with a solid 11–8 record and a 2.89 ERA with 138 strikeouts in 171 innings.

On December 16, 2011, the Yomiuri Giants announced that they had signed Houlton and gave him the number 54.

== See also ==
- Rule 5 draft results
