= Hitoshi Tamura =

Japanese baseball player

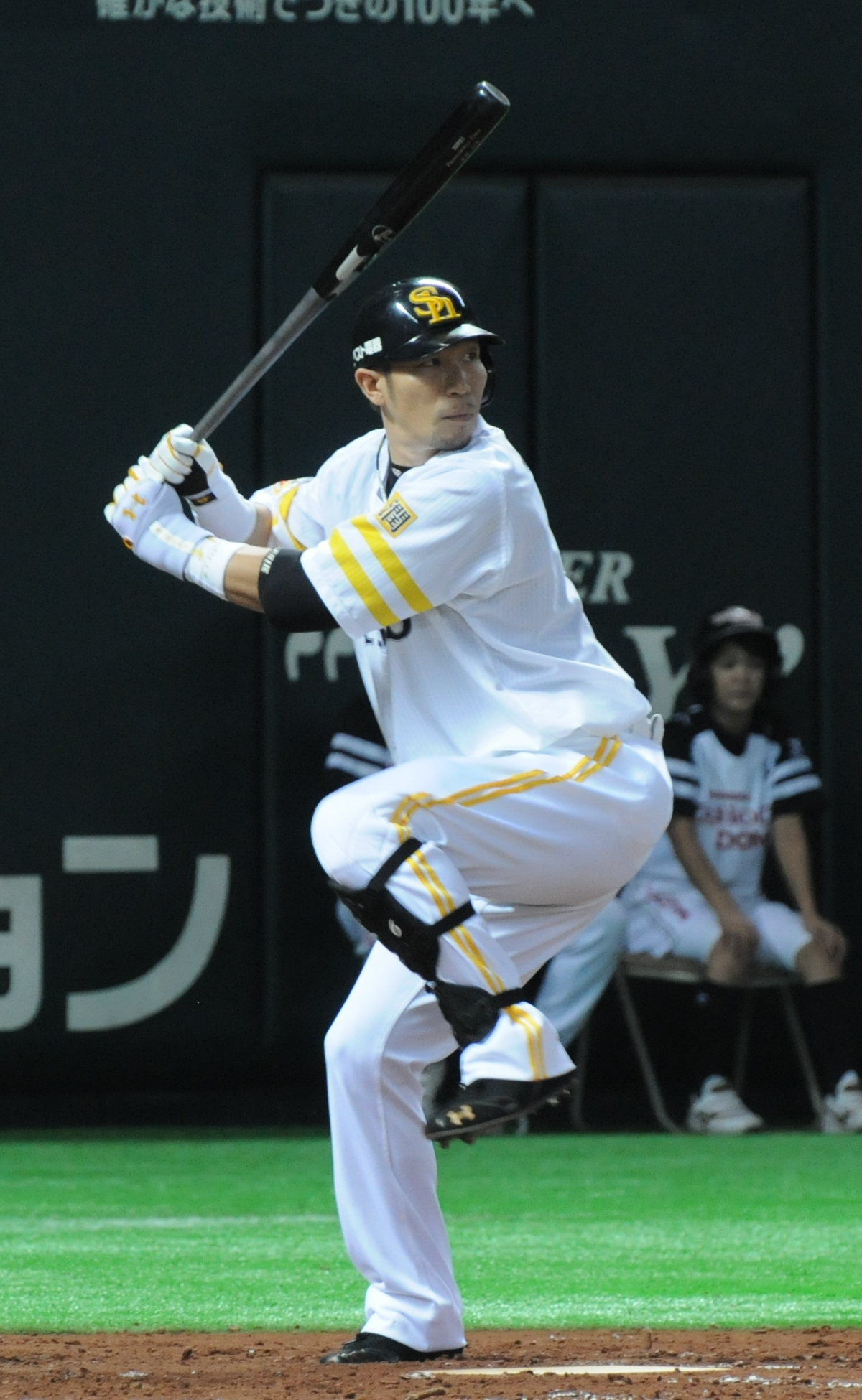
- Tamura with the Fukuoka SoftBank Hawks
- Outfielder
- Born: March 28, 1977 (age 48)
- Bats: Right Throws: Right

NPB debut
- April 4, 1997, for the Yokohama BayStars

NPB statistics
- Batting average: .281
- Runs batted in: 643
- Home runs: 195
- Stats at Baseball Reference

Teams
- Yokohama BayStars (1997–2006); Fukuoka SoftBank Hawks (2007–2012); Yokohama DeNA BayStars (2013–2015); Chunichi Dragons (2016)
Medals
Representing Japan
Men's baseball
World Baseball Classic
| Gold medal – first place | 2006 San Diego | Team |

Hitoshi Tamura (多村 仁志, born March 28, 1977) is a retired Japanese professional baseball player who last played with the Chunichi Dragons in Japan's Nippon Professional Baseball.

Following his release from the Yokohama DeNA Baystars in 2015, Tamura joined the Chunichi Dragons on a trainee contract with the hope of returning to professional baseball.

On October 1, 2016 it was announced that Tamura was deemed surplus to requirements by the Dragons management. He then announced his retirement from professional baseball.
