= Tadashi Settsu =

Japanese baseball player (born 1982)

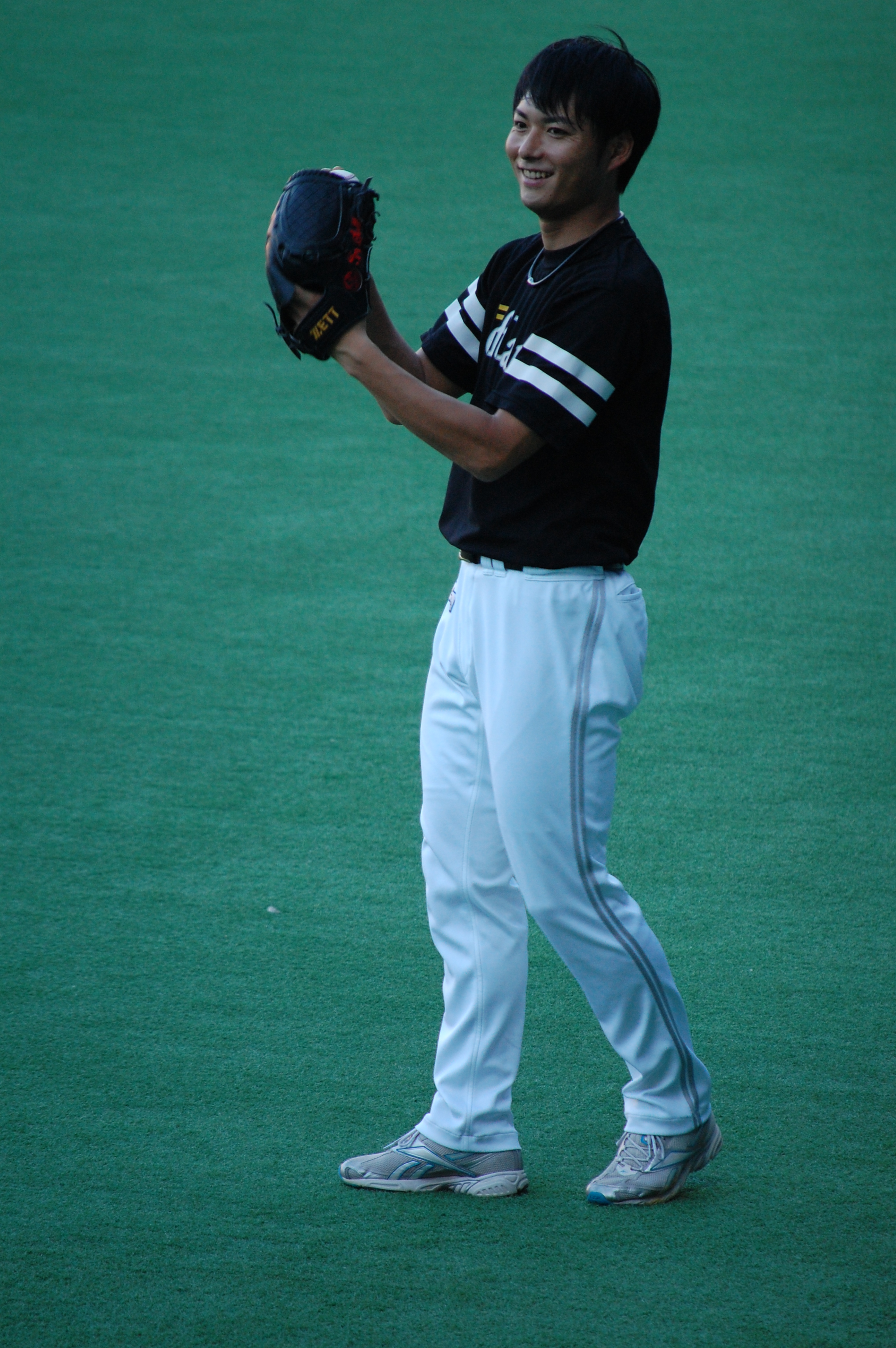
- Settsu with the Fukuoka SoftBank Hawks
- Starting pitcher
- Born: 1 June 1982 (age 43); Sendai, Miyagi, Japan
- Bats: Right Throws: Right

NPB debut
- April 5, 2009, for the Fukuoka SoftBank Hawks

NPB statistics (through 2018 season)
- Win–loss record: 79-49
- Earned run average: 2.98
- Holds: 73
- Saves: 1
- Strikeouts: 882

Teams
- Fukuoka SoftBank Hawks (2009–2018)

Career highlights and awards
- 2× NPB All-Star (2009, 2011); 2× Pacific League Hold leader (2009, 2010); Pacific League wins leader (2012); Pacific League winning percentage leader (2012); Eiji Sawamura Award (2012); 2009 Pacific League Rookie of the Year; 4× Japan Series champion (2011, 2014, 2015, 2017)

Tadashi Settsu (攝津 正, Settsu Tadashi; born 1 June 1982 in Sendai, Miyagi) is a Japanese baseball player. He has been with the Fukuoka SoftBank Hawks since 2009, and plays as pitcher, wearing number 50. In 2009, he was voted Most Valuable Rookie. The next year, he became the first pitcher ever to make 70 or more appearances in his first two seasons in the league.

He won the 2012 Sawamura Award with a record of 17-5 and a 1.91 ERA, with 153 strikeouts in 193 1/3 innings, and 3 complete games with 2 shutouts.

Settsu is a 5 ft 11 in, 200 lb right-handed pitcher. With an overhand delivery he throws a fastball that usually sits in 86-88 mph (tops out at 92 mph), curveball, slider, and a solid-average screwball around 80 mph. He also has decent command, posting a walks per nine innings rate of 2.38 in his career (until 2012 season).
