= Nagisa Arakaki =

Japanese baseball player (born 1980)

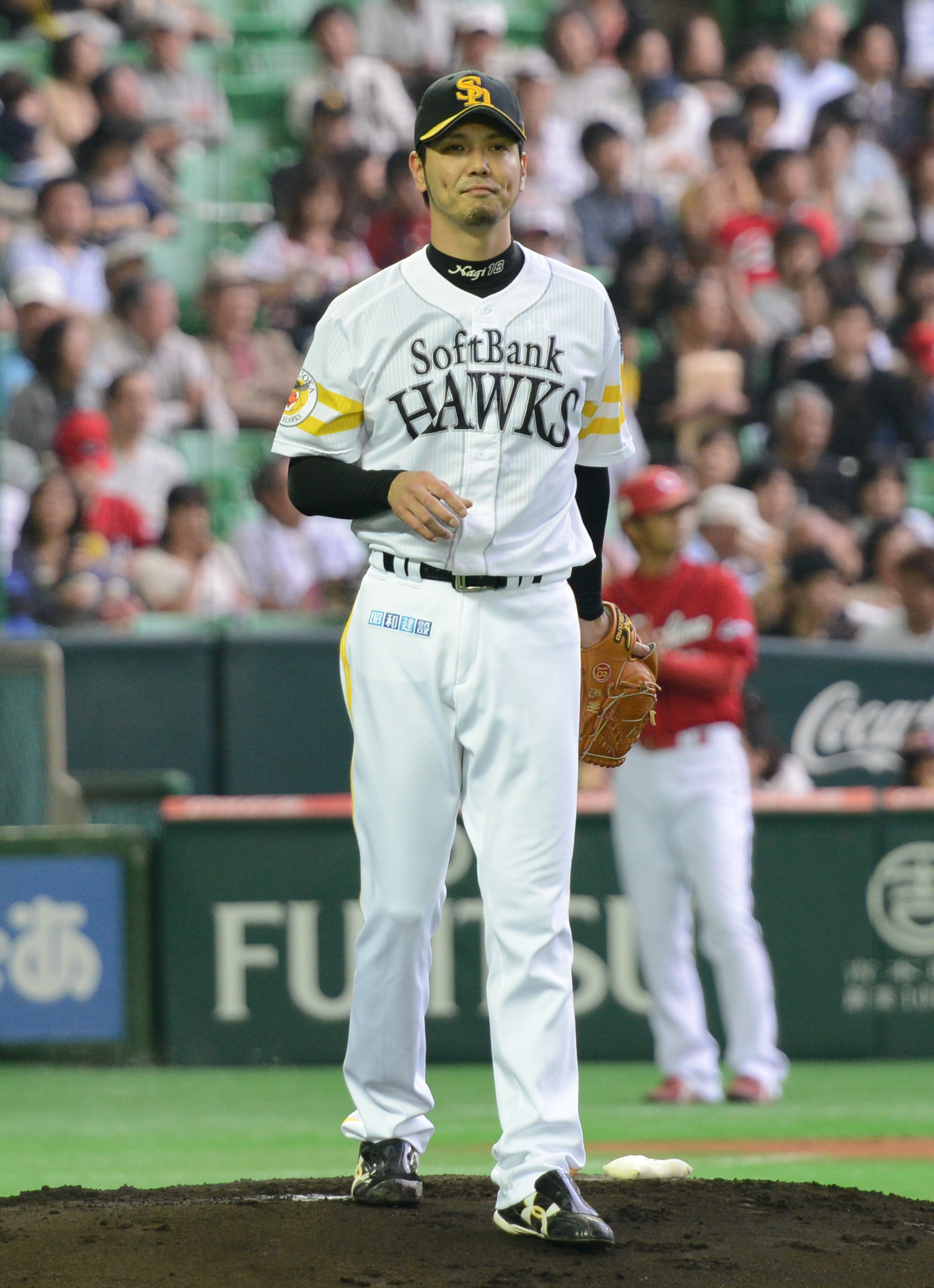
- Pitcher
- Born: May 9, 1980 (age 46); Naha, Okinawa, Japan
- Batted: Right Threw: Right

NPB debut
- March 31, 2003, for the Fukuoka Daiei Hawks

Last NPB appearance
- June 14, 2016, for the Tokyo Yakult Swallows

NPB statistics (through 2016 season)
- Win–loss: 64–64
- ERA: 3.99
- Strikeouts: 1,010
- Stats at Baseball Reference

Teams
- Fukuoka Daiei Hawks/Fukuoka SoftBank Hawks (2003–2014); Tokyo Yakult Swallows (2014–2016)

Career highlights and awards
- 2× Japan Series champion (2003, 2011); 1× NPB All-Star (2004); 1× Pacific League strikeout leader (2004)
- Last updated on: 15 August 2020

Nagisa Arakaki (新垣 渚, Arakaki Nagisa; born May 9, 1980 in Naha, Okinawa) is a former Japanese professional baseball player. He is currently with the Tokyo Yakult Swallows in Japan's Nippon Professional Baseball. Despite having one of the best fastballs and sliders of anyone in the league, Arakaki has battled control problems and injuries throughout his career. In 2007, Arakaki set the NPB record for most wild pitches in a season with 21, breaking Kazuhisa Ishii's record.

Arakaki was first seen at the 1998 Koshien summer tournament, and caught the eyes of many scouts with his fastball and sharp break on his slider. Despite his team not going far in the tournament, he was scouted by the Orix BlueWave and offered a contract. However, Arakaki turned it down stating that he did not intend to play for Orix.

In both 2008 and 2009, Arakaki had been in and out of the lineup due to persistent shoulder problems. From the end of '07 to late '08, the righty did not win a start, a stretch that spanned from September 17, 2007, to August 28, 2008. In the 2008 campaign, Arakaki finished with a 4-6 record and a 4.18 ERA. The 2009 season was far less kind, as the embattled righty went 0-2 with a 7.91 ERA whilst battling shoulder injuries. He did not pitch at the Major League level in 2010 and 2011 due to injury. He finally cracked the Opening Day roster in 2012 for his first action in nearly three years.

== Pitching style ==
When he was drafted, Arakaki was scouted as a power pitcher with a fastball that consistently registered 90–93 mph, reaching 96 mph (155 km/h), and a slider with late downward break. His control issues were documented early in his career: in 2007, he set the NPB single-season record for wild pitches, surpassing the previous mark held by Kazuhisa Ishii, another power pitcher with notable breaking balls and well-documented command difficulties.

Arakaki's later career has been plagued by recurrent shoulder and elbow problems. He had elbow surgery performed on him in the 2008 offseason, and had shoulder surgery in December 2009. Because of his rehab, he did not pitch at the ichi-gun level until 2012.
