= Takahiro Mahara =

Japanese baseball player (born 1981)

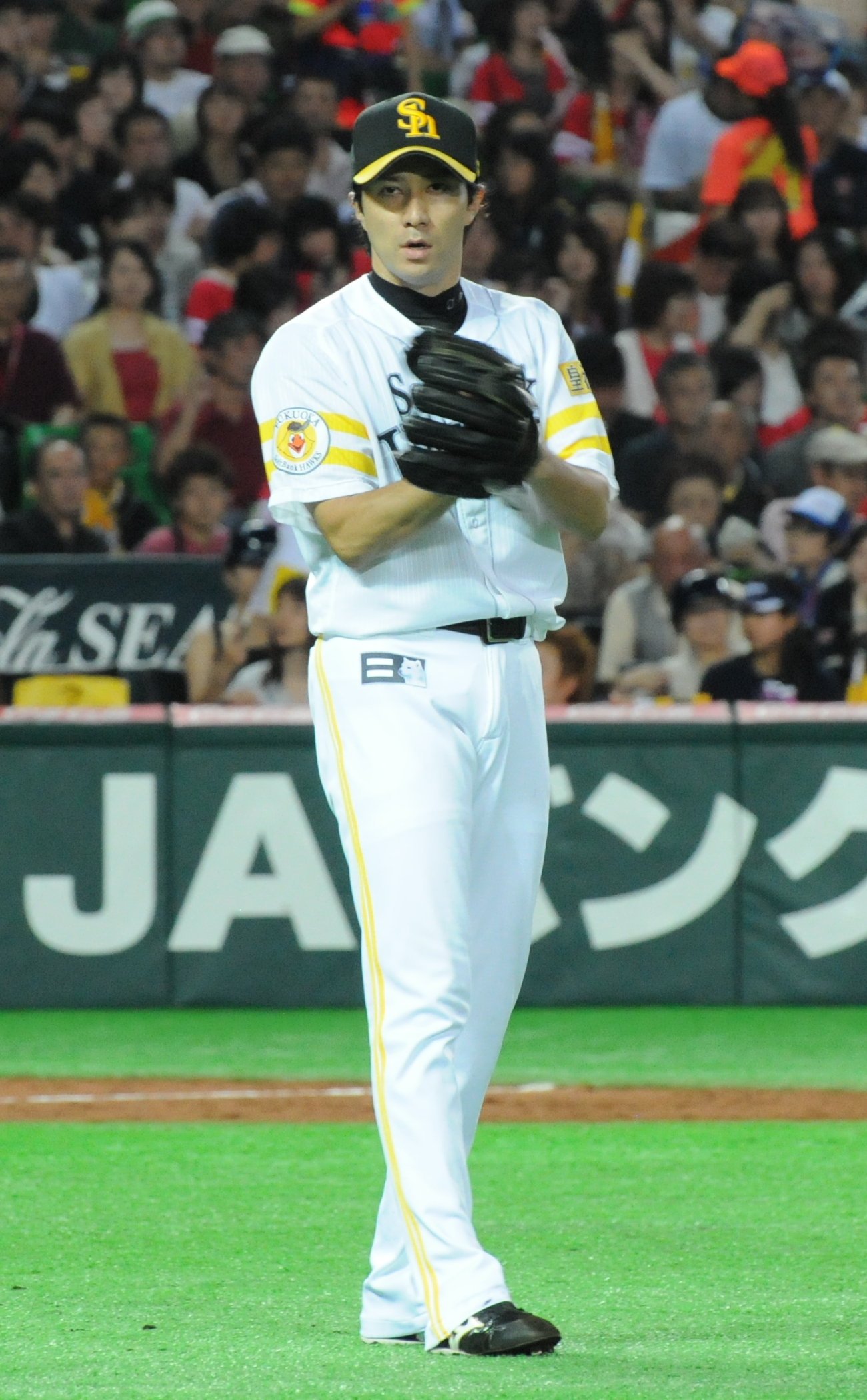
- Mahara with the Fukuoka SoftBank Hawks
- Pitcher
- Born: December 8, 1981 (age 44); Kumamoto, Japan
- Batted: Right Threw: Right

NPB debut
- March 30, 2004, for the Fukuoka Daiei Hawks

Last NPB appearance
- May 1, 2015, for the Orix Buffaloes

NPB statistics
- Win–loss record: 23–31
- Earned run average: 2.83
- Strikeouts: 455
- Saves: 182
- Stats at Baseball Reference

Teams
- Fukuoka Daiei Hawks/Fukuoka SoftBank Hawks (2004–2012); Orix Buffaloes (2013–2015)

Career highlights and awards
- Pacific League Saves Champion (2007); 3× NPB All-Star (2006, 2007, 2010)
Medals
Representing Japan
Men's baseball
World Baseball Classic
Gold medal – first place	2006 San Diego	Team
Gold medal – first place	2009 Los Angeles	Team

Takahiro Mahara (馬原 孝浩, Mahara Takahiro; born December 8, 1981) is a Japanese former professional baseball right-handed pitcher. He played in Nippon Professional Baseball (NPB) for the Fukuoka Daiei Hawks/Fukuoka SoftBank Hawks.

== Playing career ==
Mahara played in the 2006 World Baseball Classic. Originally a starter, Mahara was converted to a closer partway through 2005 season and has been an efficient closer since then.

His best season was in 2007, when Mahara broke the team record for saves by recording 38 and also recording a 1.47 ERA. The previous record-holder was Rodney Pedraza, who had 35 saves in 2000. Mahara did not blow a save until late in the season, when Orix Buffaloes slugger Tuffy Rhodes cracked a walk-off home run in the bottom of the 9th at Skymark Stadium.

With the exception of the 2008 season when he missed half the season due to injury, Mahara has recorded at least 22 saves each year since 2005.

In 2011, he was in a slump and become losing pitcher in two games in Nippon Series. In 2012, he was injured and he didn't play any games. He was traded to Orix Buffaloes in the off season.

== Coaching career ==
On October 8, 2024, Mahara was announced as the new general manager of the Hinokuni Salamanders of the independent Kyushu Asia League.
