= 2009 Chunichi Dragons season =

The 2009 Chunichi Dragons season resulted in an 81-62-1 record and qualification for the 2009 Central League Climax Series. The team was eliminated in the 2nd stage of the playoffs by the Yomiuri Giants. The season started poorly due to the departure of longtime star pitcher Kenshin Kawakami; as the season progressed, the Dragons' pitching improved, led by Taiwanese pitcher Chen Wei-Yin, Kazuki Yoshimi, Kenta Asakura, and left-handed Yudai Kawai, who won eleven games as starting pitcher, including a streak of eight games in a row, before taking his first loss of the season on August 6. Chen had the lowest Earned Run Average of any pitcher in four decades in Japan (1.54) despite having a relatively poor 8-4 starting record.

Offensively, the Dragons had only two batters with over 500 plate appearances hit over .300 for the season, but Dominican slugger Tony Blanco was a surprising success. Despite striking out far and away the most times of anybody on the team (157 K), he hit 39 home runs and made 110 runs while batting .275. Batters Masahiko Morino and Kazuhiro Wada, hit respectively 23 and 29 home runs.

Chunichi finished second in the Central League in the regular season with an 82-61-1 record, and qualified for the 2009 Central League Climax Series. In the first round of the playoffs, they closely defeated the Yakult Swallows 2-1 but were eliminated in the second stage by eventual 2009 Japan Series champions the Yomiuri Giants.

== Regular season ==
=== Standings ===
2009 Central League regular season standings
Team	Pld	W	L	T	PCT	GB
Yomiuri Giants	144	89	46	9	.649	—
Chunichi Dragons	144	81	62	1	.566	12
Tokyo Yakult Swallows	144	71	72	1	.497	22
Hanshin Tigers	144	67	73	4	.479	24.5
Hiroshima Carp	144	65	75	4	.465	26.5
Yokohama BayStars	144	51	93	0	.354	42.5

=== Game log ===
2009 Game Log
April

#	Date	Opponent	Score	Win	Loss	Save	Attendance	Record
1	April 3	BayStars	4 - 1	Asao (1-0)	Miura (0-1)	Iwase (1)	37,678	1-0-0
2	April 4	BayStars	6 - 0	Yoshimi (1-0)	Glynn (0-1)		36,528	2-0-0
3	April 5	BayStars	6 - 0	Chen (1-0)	Kobayashi (0-1)		33,496	3-0-0
4	April 7	@Swallows	3 - 4	Takahashi (1-0)	Oshimoto (0-1)	Iwase (2)	17,538	4-0-0
5	April 8	@Swallows	8 - 4	Kida (1-0)	Nakata (0-1)		15,089	4-1-0
6	April 9	@Swallows	10 - 7	Ishikawa (1-1)	Asao (1-1)	Lim (2)	14,526	4-2-0
7	April 10	@Carp	3 - 11	Yoshimi (2-0)	Lewis (1-1)	Nelson (1)	30,618	5-2-0
8	April 11	@Carp	2 - 0	Maeda (2-0)	Shimizu (0-1)		30,268	5-3-0
9	April 12	@Carp	10 - 0	Shinoda (1-0)	Yamamoto (0-1)		30,139	5-4-0
—	April 14	@Tigers	Postponed (rained out)					
10	April 15	@Tigers	2 - 9	Asakura (1-0)	Shimoyanagi (1-1)		40,476	6-4-0
11	April 16	@Tigers	4 - 3	Atchison (1-0)	Asao (1-2)	Fujikawa (2)	40,195	6-5-0
12	April 17	Giants	3 - 5	Tono (2-0)	Yoshimi (2-1)	Kroon (3)	35,669	6-6-0
13	April 18	Giants	2 - 3	Yamaguchi (1-0)	Chen (1-1)	Kroon (4)	37,883	6-7-0
14	April 19	Giants	5 - 6	Nishimura (1-0)	Nelson (0-1)	Kroon (5)	37,815	6-8-0
15	April 21	Tigers	2 - 1	Asakura (2-0)	Shimoyanagi (1-2)	Iwase (3)	30,434	7-8-0
16	April 22	Tigers	6 - 2	Asao (2-2)	Kubota (0-1)	Iwase (4)	31,650	8-8-0
17	April 23	Tigers	1 - 4 (12)	Fujikawa (1-0)	Nelson (0-2)		30,850	8-9-0
18	April 24	@Giants	2 - 3 (10)	Kobayashi (1-0)	Ochi (2-1)	Iwase (5)	42,262	9-9-0
19	April 25	@Giants	5 - 4	Toyoda (1-0)	Iwase (0-1)		43,707	9-10-0
20	April 26	@Giants	0 - 8	Kawai (1-0)	Greisinger (3-2)		43,020	10-10-0
21	April 28	Swallows	2 - 4	Kida (2-2)	Asakura (2-1)	Lim (5)	12,115	10-11-0
22	April 29	Swallows	1 - 7	Tateyama (2-0)	Asao (2-3)		33,318	10-12-0
23	April 30	Swallows	0 - 3	Ishikawa (3-1)	Yoshimi (2-2)	Lim (6)	29,184	10-13-0

May

#	Date	Opponent	Score	Win	Loss	Save	Attendance	Record
24	May 2	@BayStars	6 - 1	Miura (3-2)	Yamai (0-1)		21,080	10-14-0
25	May 3	@BayStars	0 - 2	Chen (2-1)	Glynn (1-4)		23,920	11-14-0
26	May 4	@BayStars	2 - 4	Saito (1-0)	Ishii (0-3)	Hirai (1)	22,529	12-14-0
27	May 5	Carp	0 - 2	Otake (2-1)	Asakura (2-2)	Nagakawa (9)	37,494	12-15-0
28	May 6	Carp	4 - 2	Asao (3-3)	Saito (2-2)	Iwase (6)	36,159	13-15-0
29	May 7	Carp	4 - 3	Saito (2-0)	Umetsu (2-1)		26,978	14-15-0
30	May 8	@Giants	10 - 4	Greisinger (4-2)	Yamai (0-2)		42,927	14-16-0
31	May 9	@Giants	3 - 1	Gonzalez (2-0)	Chen (2-2)	Ochi (3)	42,047	14-17-0
32	May 10	@Giants	8 - 7	Nakamura (1-1)	Saito (2-1)	Ochi (4)	43,185	14-18-0
33	May 12	Swallows	6 - 3	Asakura (3-2)	Ichiba (1-3)	Iwase (7)	9,059	15-18-0
34	May 13	Swallows	1 - 7	Ishikawa (5-1)	Asao (3-4)		26,258	15-19-0
35	May 14	Swallows	5 - 8	Matsuoka (1-0)	Ogasawara (0-1)	Lim (11)	25,010	15-20-0
36	May 15	BayStars	1 - 0 (10)	Yoshimi (3-2)	Ishii (0-4)		27,711	16-20-0
37	May 16	BayStars	2 - 1 (10)	Iwase (1-1)	Yamaguchi (3-2)		32,869	17-20-0
38	May 17	BayStars	4 - 1	Kawai (2-0)	Kobayashi (1-3)	Iwase (8)	33,935	18-20-0
39	May 19	@Lions	5 - 7	Asakura (4-2)	Onuma (1-3)	Iwase (9)	18,110	19-20-0
40	May 20	@Lions	2 - 1 (10)	Nogami (1-2)	Asao (3-5)		19,203	19-21-0
41	May 22	@Marines	1 - 4	Yoshimi (4-2)	Omine (2-2)	Iwase (10)	14,660	20-21-0
42	May 23	@Marines	2 - 1	Sikorski (3-2)	Hirai (0-1)		28,117	20-22-0
43	May 24	Fighters	1 - 0	Kawai (3-0)	Takeda (2-3)	Iwase (11)	31,711	21-22-0
44	May 25	Fighters	10 - 4	Asakura (5-2)	Itokazu (0-1)		29,051	22-22-0
45	May 27	Eagles	2 - 3	Tanaka (7-0)	Takahashi (1-1)	Aoyama (2)	32,208	22-23-0
46	May 28	Eagles	2 - 1 (10)	Nagamine (1-0)	Aoyama (0-2)		28,262	23-23-0
47	May 30	@Hawks	9 - 5	Satō (1-0)	Nagamine (1-1)		30,387	23-24-0
48	May 31	@Hawks	5 - 4	Falkenborg (3-0)	Takahashi (1-2)		33,231	23-25-0

June

#	Date	Opponent	Score	Win	Loss	Save	Attendance	Record
49	June 2	@Buffaloes						
50	June 3	@Buffaloes						
51	June 5	Marines						
52	June 6	Marines						
53	June 7	Lions						
54	June 8	Lions						
55	June 10	@Eagles						
56	June 11	@Eagles						
57	June 13	@Fighters						
58	June 14	@Fighters						
59	June 16	Hawks						
60	June 17	Hawks						
61	June 20	Buffaloes						
62	June 21	Buffaloes						
63	June 26	@Carp						
64	June 27	@Carp						
65	June 28	@Carp						
66	June 30	Tigers						

July

#	Date	Opponent	Score	Win	Loss	Save	Attendance	Record
67	July 1	Tigers						
68	July 2	Tigers						
69	July 3	Giants						
70	July 4	Giants						
71	July 5	Giants						
72	July 7	@Swallows						
73	July 8	@Swallows						
74	July 9	@Swallows						
75	July 10	Carp						
76	July 11	Carp						
77	July 12	Carp						
78	July 14	@Tigers						
79	July 15	@Tigers						
80	July 16	@Tigers						
81	July 17	@BayStars						
82	July 18	@BayStars						
83	July 19	@BayStars						
84	July 20	Carp						
85	July 21	Carp						
86	July 22	Carp						
87	July 28	@Giants						
88	July 29	@Giants						
89	July 30	@Giants						
90	July 31	@Swallows						

August

#	Date	Opponent	Score	Win	Loss	Save	Attendance	Record
91	August 1	@Swallows						
92	August 2	@Swallows						
93	August 4	Tigers						
94	August 5	Tigers						
95	August 6	Tigers						
96	August 7	@BayStars						
97	August 8	@BayStars						
98	August 9	@BayStars						
99	August 11	@Tigers						
100	August 12	@Tigers						
101	August 13	@Tigers						
102	August 14	Swallows						
103	August 15	Swallows						
104	August 16	Swallows						
105	August 18	@Carp						
106	August 19	@Carp						
107	August 20	@Carp						
108	August 21	BayStars						
109	August 22	BayStars						
110	August 23	BayStars						
111	August 25	Giants						
112	August 26	Giants						
113	August 27	Giants						
114	August 28	@Swallows						
115	August 29	@Swallows						
116	August 30	@Swallows						

September

#	Date	Opponent	Score	Win	Loss	Save	Attendance	Record
117	September 1	Carp						
118	September 2	Carp						
119	September 3	Carp						
120	September 5	@BayStars						
121	September 6	@BayStars						
122	September 8	@Tigers						
123	September 9	@Tigers						
124	September 10	@Tigers						
125	September 11	Swallows						
126	September 12	Swallows						
127	September 13	Swallows						
128	September 15	@Carp						
129	September 16	@Carp						
130	September 17	@Carp						
131	September 18	BayStars						
132	September 19	BayStars						
133	September 20	BayStars						
134	September 21	@Giants						
135	September 22	@Giants						
136	September 23	@Giants						
137	September 25	Tigers						
138	September 26	Tigers						
139	September 27	Tigers						
140	September 28	Giants						
141	September 29	Giants						
142	September 30	Giants						

== Player stats ==
=== Batting ===
Player	G	AB	H	Avg.	HR	RBI	SB

=== Pitching ===
Player	G	GS	IP	W	L	SV	ERA	SO
