= 2009 Tokyo Yakult Swallows season =

Japanese baseball team season

The 2009 Tokyo Yakult Swallows season features the Swallows quest to win their first Central League title since 2001.

== Regular season ==
=== Standings ===
2009 Central League regular season standings
Team	Pld	W	L	T	PCT	GB
Yomiuri Giants	144	89	46	9	.649	—
Chunichi Dragons	144	81	62	1	.566	12
Tokyo Yakult Swallows	144	71	72	1	.497	22
Hanshin Tigers	144	67	73	4	.479	24.5
Hiroshima Carp	144	65	75	4	.465	26.5
Yokohama BayStars	144	51	93	0	.354	42.5

=== Game log ===
2009 Game Log
April

#	Date	Opponent	Score	Win	Loss	Save	Attendance	Record
1	April 3	@Tigers	5 - 2	Ando (1-0)	Ishikawa (0-1)	Fujikawa (1)	33,792	0-1-0
2	April 4	@Tigers	1 - 5	Sato (1-0)	Nomi (0-1)		33,449	1-1-0
3	April 5	@Tigers	6 - 7	Kawashima (1-0)	Fukuhara (0-1)	Lim (1)	33,436	2-1-0
4	April 7	Dragons	3 - 4	Takahashi (1-0)	Oshimoto (0-1)	Iwase (2)	17,538	2-2-0
5	April 8	Dragons	8 - 4	Kida (1-0)	Nakata (0-1)		15,089	3-2-0
6	April 9	Dragons	10 - 7	Ishikawa (1-1)	Asao (1-1)	Lim (2)	14,526	4-2-0
7	April 10	@BayStars	9 - 1	Miura (1-1)	Sato (1-1)		12,791	4-3-0
8	April 11	@BayStars	0 - 3	Ichiba (1-0)	Glynn (0-2)	Lim (3)	17,817	5-3-0
9	April 12	@BayStars	5 - 3	Yamaguchi (1-0)	Kawashima (1-1)	Ishii (1)	17,972	5-4-0
—	April 14	Giants	Postponed (rained out)					
10	April 15	Giants	2 - 6	Greisinger (2-1)	Kida (1-1)		20,072	5-5-0
11	April 16	Giants	6 - 2	Tateyama (1-0)	Utsumi (0-1)		16,592	6-5-0
12	April 17	Carp	6 - 1	Ishikawa (2-1)	Aoki (0-1)		10,865	7-5-0
13	April 18	Carp	1 - 0	Sato (2-1)	Maeda (2-1)	Lim (4)	25,455	8-5-0
14	April 19	Carp	8 - 2	Kawashima (2-1)	Shinoda (1-1)		17,702	9-5-0
15	April 21	@Giants	4 - 0	Greisinger (3-1)	Kida (1-2)		20,817	9-6-0
16	April 22	@Giants	3 - 2	Yamaguchi (2-0)	Igarashi (0-1)	Kroon (6)	15,876	9-7-0
17	April 23	@Giants	2 - 1	Ochi (2-0)	Oshimoto (0-2)		20,120	9-8-0
18	April 24	BayStars	0 - 3	Miura (2-2)	Ichiba (1-1)	Ishii (5)	12,512	9-9-0
—	April 25	BayStars	Postponed (rained out)					
19	April 26	BayStars	2 - 6	Glynn (1-3)	Sato (2-2)		16,185	9-10-0
20	April 28	@Dragons	2 - 4	Kida (2-2)	Asakura (2-1)	Lim (5)	12,115	10-10-0
21	April 29	@Dragons	1 - 7	Tateyama (2-0)	Asao (2-3)		33,318	11-10-0
22	April 30	@Dragons	0 - 3	Ishikawa (3-1)	Yoshimi (2-2)	Lim (6)	29,184	12-10-0

May

#	Date	Opponent	Score	Win	Loss	Save	Attendance	Record
23	May 2	@Carp	9 - 2	Umetsu (2-0)	Ichiba (1-2)		31,427	12-11-0
24	May 3	@Carp	2 - 3	Kida (3-2)	Yokoyama (0-1)	Lim (7)	31,622	13-11-0
25	May 4	@Carp	3 - 5	Oshimoto (1-2)	Makino (0-1)	Lim (8)	31,834	14-11-0
—	May 5	Tigers	Postponed (rained out)					
—	May 6	Tigers	Postponed (rained out)					
26	May 7	Tigers	2 - 1	Ishikawa (4-1)	Kubo (0-2)	Lim (9)	15,575	15-11-0
27	May 9	Carp	1 - 4	Lewis (2-1)	Kawashima (2-2)	Nagakawa (10)	19,119	15-12-0
28	May 10	Carp	4 - 1	Tateyama (3-0)	Hayashi (0-1)	Lim (10)	14,891	16-12-0
29	May 12	@Dragons	6 - 3	Asakura (3-2)	Ichiba (1-3)	Iwase (7)	9,059	16-13-0
30	May 13	@Dragons	1 - 7	Ishikawa (5-1)	Asao (3-4)		26,258	17-13-0
31	May 14	@Dragons	5 - 8	Matsuoka (1-0)	Ogasawara (0-1)	Lim (11)	25,010	18-13-0
32	May 15	Tigers	2 - 1	Matsuoka (2-0)	Nomi (2-4)	Lim (12)	22,528	19-13-0
33	May 16	Tigers	4 - 1	Tateyama (4-0)	Fukuhara (2-3)	Lim (13)	28,380	20-13-0
34	May 17	Tigers	2 - 1	Kawashima (3-2)	Egusa (2-2)	Igarashi (1)	19,534	21-13-0
35	May 19	@Eagles	3 - 7	Ishikawa (6-1)	Rasner (2-3)		12,691	22-13-0
36	May 20	@Eagles	2 - 0	Tanaka (6-0)	Sato (2-3)		19,295	22-14-0
37	May 22	@Fighters	2 - 3	Tateyama (5-0)	Fujii (3-2)	Lim (14)	20,932	23-14-0
38	May 23	@Fighters	3 - 0	Darvish (6-1)	Barrett (0-1)		31,288	23-15-0
39	May 24	Hawks	5 - 8	Otonari (2-3)	Kawashima (3-3)		16,518	23-16-0
40	May 25	Hawks	2 - 3	Sugiuchi (5-1)	Ishikawa (6-2)	Mahara (8)	15,555	23-17-0
41	May 27	Buffaloes	5 - 4	Matsuoka (3-0)	Katsuki (1-1)	Lim (15)	12,014	24-17-0
42	May 28	Buffaloes	4 - 0	Tateyama (6-0)	Mitsuhara (1-1)		7,348	25-17-0
43	May 30	@Marines	6 - 3	Naruse (3-2)	Tanaka (0-1)		15,431	25-18-0
44	May 31	@Marines	1 - 7	Kawashima (4-3)	Omine (2-3)		27,310	26-18-0

June

#	Date	Opponent	Score	Win	Loss	Save	Attendance	Record
45	June 2	@Lions	7 - 3	Wasdin (1-2)	Ishikawa (6-3)		16,001	26-19-0
46	June 3	@Lions						
47	June 5	Eagles						
48	June 6	Eagles						
49	June 7	Fighters						
50	June 8	Fighters						
51	June 10	@Hawks						
52	June 11	@Hawks						
53	June 13	@Buffaloes						
54	June 14	@Buffaloes						
55	June 17	Marines						
56	June 18	Marines						
57	June 20	Lions						
58	June 21	Lions						
59	June 26	@Giants						
60	June 27	@Giants						
61	June 28	@Giants						
62	June 30	@BayStars						

== Player stats ==
=== Batting ===
Player	G	AB	H	Avg.	HR	RBI	SB

=== Pitching ===
Player	G	GS	IP	W	L	SV	ERA	SO
