= 2009 Central League Climax Series =

First stage
Team (Wins)		Manager	Season
Chunichi Dragons (2)		Hiromitsu Ochiai	81–61–1 (.556), 12 GB
Tokyo Yakult Swallows (1)		Shigeru Takada	71–72–1 (.497), 22 GB
- Dates: October 17–19

Second stage
Team (Wins)		Manager	Season
Yomiuri Giants (4)		Tatsunori Hara	89–46–9 (.659), 12 GA
Chunichi Dragons (1)		Hiromitsu Ochiai	81–61–1 (.556), 12 GB
- Dates: October 21–24
- MVP: Ryota Wakiya (Yomiuri)

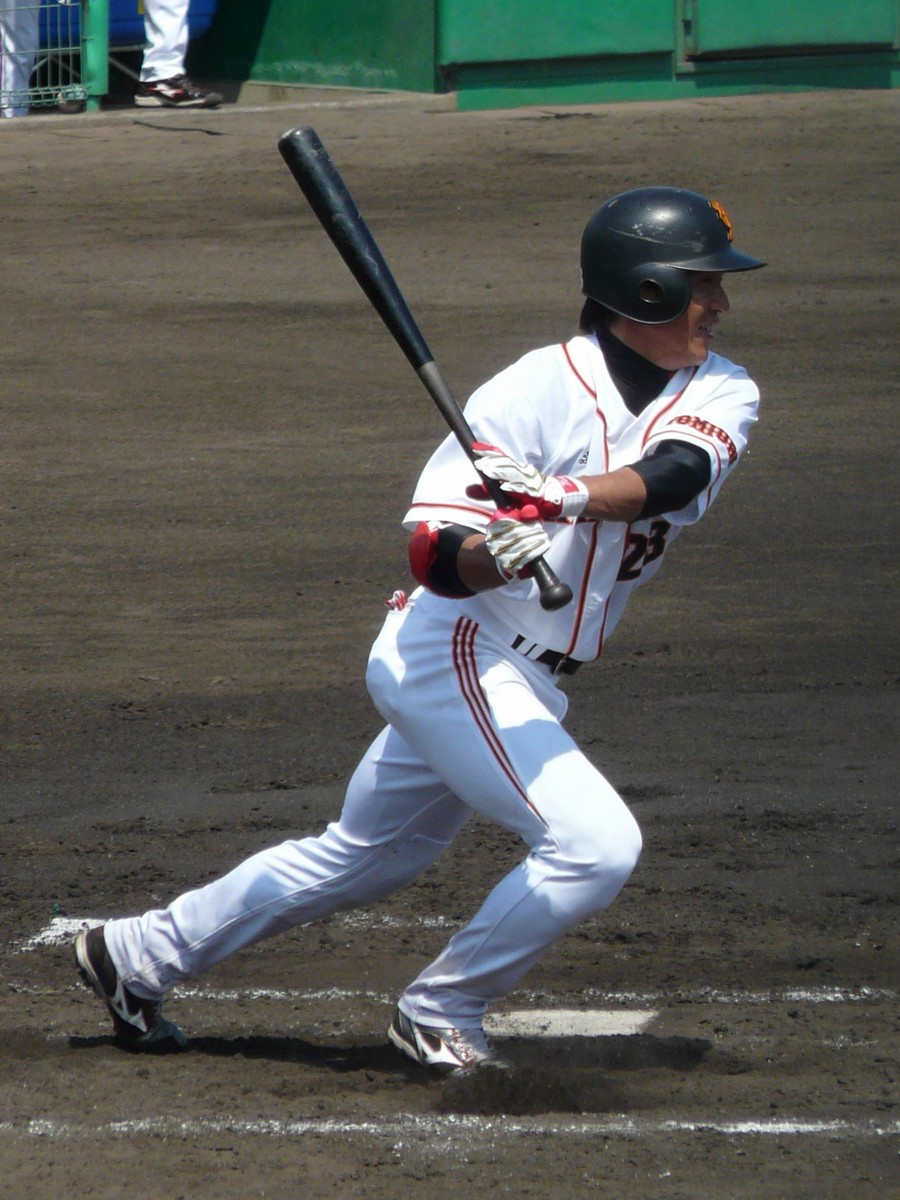
Ryota Wakiya, infielder of the Yomiuri Giants, at Yokkaichi Kasumigaura Baseball Stadium in 2009

The 2009 Central League Climax Series (CLCS) consisted of two consecutive series, Stage 1 being a best-of-three series and Stage 2 being a best-of-six with the top seed being awarded a one-win advantage. The winner of the series advanced to the 2009 Japan Series, where they competed against the 2009 Pacific League Climax Series (PLCS) winner. The top three regular-season finishers played in the two series. The CLCS began on with the first game of Stage 1 on October 17 and ended with the final game of Stage 2 on October 24.

== First stage ==
=== Summary ===
Chunichi Dragons won the series, 2–1.

Game	Date	Score	Location	Time	Attendance
1	October 17	Tokyo Yakult Swallows – 3, Chunichi Dragons – 2	Nagoya Dome	3:24	38,391
2	October 18	Tokyo Yakult Swallows – 2, Chunichi Dragons – 3	Nagoya Dome	3:18	38,171
3	October 19	Tokyo Yakult Swallows – 4, Chunichi Dragons – 7	Nagoya Dome	4:03	32,897

=== Game 1 ===
Saturday, October 17, 2009, 6:01 pm (JST) at Nagoya Dome in Nagoya, Aichi Prefecture
Team	1	2	3	4	5	6	7	8	9	R	H	E
Yakult	0	0	0	0	0	0	3	0	0	3	5	0
Chunichi	0	0	0	1	1	0	0	0	0	2	8	0
WP: Masanori Ishikawa (1–0) LP: Chen Wei-Yin (0–1) Sv: Lim Chang-Yong (1); Home runs: YAK: Jamie D'Antona (1); CHU: Kazuhiro Wada (1)

=== Game 2 ===
Sunday, October 18, 2009, 6:00 pm (JST) at Nagoya Dome in Nagoya, Aichi Prefecture
Team	1	2	3	4	5	6	7	8	9	R	H	E
Yakult	0	2	0	0	0	0	0	0	0	2	7	2
Chunichi	1	1	0	0	0	0	1	0	X	3	7	1
WP: Kazuki Yoshimi (1–0) LP: Shohei Tateyama (0–1) Sv: Hitoki Iwase (1); Home runs: YAK: Ryohei Kawamoto (1); CHU: Motonobu Tanishige (1)

=== Game 3 ===
Monday, October 19, 2009, 6:00 pm (JST) at Nagoya Dome in Nagoya, Aichi Prefecture
Team	1	2	3	4	5	6	7	8	9	R	H	E
Yakult	1	0	0	0	0	0	0	2	1	4	11	0
Chunichi	0	0	2	0	3	0	0	2	X	7	16	0
WP: Kenichi Nakata (1–0) LP: Yoshinori Sato (0–1); Home runs: YAK: None; CHU: Kazuhiro Wada (2)

== Second stage ==
=== Summary ===
Yomiuri Giants won the series, 4–1*.

Game	Date	Score	Location	Time	Attendance
1	October 21	Chunichi Dragons – 7, Yomiuri Giants – 2	Tokyo Dome	3:11	41,259
2	October 22	Chunichi Dragons – 4, Yomiuri Giants – 6	Tokyo Dome	3:53	40,452
3	October 23	Chunichi Dragons – 4, Yomiuri Giants – 5	Tokyo Dome	3:33	45,409
4	October 24	Chunichi Dragons – 2, Yomiuri Giants – 8	Tokyo Dome	3:37	46,535

* The Central League regular season champion is given a one-game advantage in the Second Stage.

=== Game 1 ===
Wednesday, October 21, 2009, 6:00 pm (JST) at Tokyo Dome in Bunkyō, Tokyo
Team	1	2	3	4	5	6	7	8	9	R	H	E
Chunichi	5	0	1	0	0	1	0	0	0	7	10	0
Yomiuri	0	1	0	0	0	0	1	0	0	2	5	0
WP: Takashi Ogasawara (1–0) LP: Dicky Gonzalez (0–1); Home runs: CHU: Kei Nomoto (1), Tony Blanco (1); YOM: None

=== Game 2 ===
Thursday, October 22, 2009, 6:00 pm (JST) at Tokyo Dome in Bunkyō, Tokyo
Team	1	2	3	4	5	6	7	8	9	R	H	E
Chunichi	2	0	0	0	0	0	0	2	0	4	8	0
Yomiuri	1	0	1	3	1	0	0	0	X	6	15	0
WP: Wirfin Obispo (1–0) LP: Chen Wei-Yin (0–1) Sv: Marc Kroon (1); Home runs: CHU: Masahiko Morino (1), Atsushi Fujii (1); YOM: Shinnosuke Abe (1)

=== Game 3 ===
Friday, October 23, 2009, 6:00 pm (JST) at Tokyo Dome in Bunkyō, Tokyo
Team	1	2	3	4	5	6	7	8	9	R	H	E
Chunichi	2	0	0	0	0	0	2	0	0	4	8	1
Yomiuri	0	0	0	0	0	2	0	3	X	5	10	0
WP: Kiyoshi Toyoda (1–0) LP: Takuya Asao (0–1) Sv: Marc Kroon (2); Home runs: CHU: Masahiko Morino (2); YOM: Alex Ramírez (1), Yoshiyuki Kamei (1)

=== Game 4 ===
Saturday, October 24, 2009, 6:00 pm (JST) at Tokyo Dome in Bunkyō, Tokyo
Team	1	2	3	4	5	6	7	8	9	R	H	E
Chunichi	0	0	0	1	1	0	0	0	0	2	6	1
Yomiuri	2	0	5	0	0	1	0	0	X	8	9	1
WP: Daisuke Ochi (1–0) LP: Kenichi Nakata (0–1); Home runs: CHU: Tony Blanco (2); YOM: Yoshitomo Tani (1)
