= 2008 Central League Climax Series =

First stage
Team (Wins)		Manager	Season
Chunichi Dragons (2)		Hiromitsu Ochiai	71–68–5 (.511), 12 GB
Hanshin Tigers (1)		Akinobu Okada	82–59–3 (.582), 2 GB
- Dates: October 18–20

Second stage
Team (Wins)		Manager	Season
Yomiuri Giants (3)		Tatsunori Hara	84–57–3 (.596), 2 GA
Chunichi Dragons (1)		Hiromitsu Ochiai	71–68–5 (.511), 12 GB
- Dates: October 22–25
- MVP: Alex Ramírez (Yomiuri)

The 2008 Central League Climax Series (CLCS) consisted of two consecutive series, Stage 1 being a best-of-three series and Stage 2 being a best-of-six with the top seed being awarded a one-win advantage. The winner of the series advanced to the 2008 Japan Series, where they competed against the 2008 Pacific League Climax Series (PLCS) winner. The top three regular-season finishers played in the two series. The CLCS began on with the first game of Stage 1 on October 18 and ended with the final game of Stage 2 on October 25.

== First stage ==
=== Summary ===
The Hanshin Tigers were awarded home-field advantage for the entirety of Stage 1; however, all three games were played in the Orix Buffaloes' Kyocera Osaka Dome, a neutral field, as renovations to Koshien Stadium prevented postseason play.

Chunichi Dragons won the series, 2–1.

Game	Date	Score	Location	Time	Attendance
1	October 18	Chunichi Dragons – 2, Hanshin Tigers – 0	Kyocera Dome Osaka	2:49	33,824
2	October 19	Chunichi Dragons – 3, Hanshin Tigers – 7	Kyocera Dome Osaka	3:16	33,881
3	October 20	Chunichi Dragons – 2, Hanshin Tigers – 0	Kyocera Dome Osaka	2:38	33,021

=== Game 1 ===
Saturday, October 18, 2008, 6:00 pm (JST) at Kyocera Dome Osaka in Osaka, Osaka Prefecture
Team	1	2	3	4	5	6	7	8	9	R	H	E
Chunichi	1	0	0	0	0	1	0	0	0	2	5	0
Hanshin	0	0	0	0	0	0	0	0	0	0	6	0
WP: Kenshin Kawakami (1–0) LP: Yuya Ando (0–1) Sv: Hitoki Iwase (1); Home runs: CHU: Masahiko Morino (1); HAN: None

=== Game 2 ===
Sunday, October 19, 2008, 6:00 pm (JST) at Kyocera Dome Osaka in Osaka, Osaka Prefecture
Team	1	2	3	4	5	6	7	8	9	R	H	E
Chunichi	0	1	0	0	0	1	0	1	0	3	10	0
Hanshin	4	0	0	0	0	3	0	0	X	7	11	0
WP: Tsuyoshi Shimoyanagi (1–0) LP: Chen Wei-Yin (0–1); Home runs: CHU: Masahiko Morino (2), Tyrone Woods (1); HAN: Takashi Toritani (2)

=== Game 3 ===
Monday, October 20, 2008, 6:00 pm (JST) at Kyocera Dome Osaka in Osaka, Osaka Prefecture
Team	1	2	3	4	5	6	7	8	9	R	H	E
Chunichi	0	0	0	0	0	0	0	0	2	2	4	3
Hanshin	0	0	0	0	0	0	0	0	0	0	4	2
WP: Kazuki Yoshimi (1–0) LP: Kyuji Fujikawa (0–1) Sv: Hitoki Iwase (2); Home runs: CHU: Tyrone Woods (2); HAN: None

== Second stage ==
=== Summary ===
Yomiuri Giants won the series, 3–1–1*.

Game	Date	Score	Location	Time	Attendance
1	October 22	Chunichi Dragons – 4, Yomiuri Giants – 3	Tokyo Dome	4:05	44,072
2	October 23	Chunichi Dragons – 2, Yomiuri Giants – 11	Tokyo Dome	2:45	43,536
3	October 24	Chunichi Dragons – 5, Yomiuri Giants – 5 (12)	Tokyo Dome	4:42	45,846
4	October 25	Chunichi Dragons – 2, Yomiuri Giants – 6	Tokyo Dome	3:27	46,797

* The Central League regular season champion is given a one-game advantage in the Second Stage.

=== Game 1 ===
Wednesday, October 22, 2008, 6:00 pm (JST) at Tokyo Dome in Bunkyō, Tokyo
Team	1	2	3	4	5	6	7	8	9	R	H	E
Chunichi	2	0	0	0	1	1	0	0	1	4	9	0
Yomiuri	1	0	0	1	1	0	0	0	0	3	7	1
WP: Masato Kobayashi (1–0) LP: Marc Kroon (0–1) Sv: Hitoki Iwase (1); Home runs: CHU: Lee Byung-Kyu (1), Tyrone Woods (1); YOM: Yoshitomo Tani (1)

=== Game 2 ===
Thursday, October 23, 2008, 6:00 pm (JST) at Tokyo Dome in Bunkyō, Tokyo
Team	1	2	3	4	5	6	7	8	9	R	H	E
Chunichi	1	0	1	0	0	0	0	0	0	2	5	0
Yomiuri	2	4	0	2	0	0	1	2	X	11	17	0
WP: Koji Uehara (1–0) LP: Kenta Asakura (0–1); Home runs: CHU: Masahiko Morino (1), Ryosuke Hirata (1); YOM: Michihiro Ogasawara (2), Alex Ramírez (1), Lee Seung-Yeop (1)

=== Game 3 ===
Friday, October 24, 2008, 6:00 pm (JST) at Tokyo Dome in Bunkyō, Tokyo
Team	1	2	3	4	5	6	7	8	9	10	11	12	R	H	E
Chunichi	0	0	0	3	0	0	0	1	1	0	0	0	5	8	0
Yomiuri	0	0	1	0	0	4	0	0	0	0	0	0	5	8	0
Home runs: CHU: Kazuhiro Wada (1), Tyrone Woods (2); YOM: Kazunari Tsuruoka (1), Lee Seung-Yeop (2)

=== Game 4 ===
Saturday, October 25, 2008, 6:00 pm (JST) at Tokyo Dome in Bunkyō, Tokyo
Team	1	2	3	4	5	6	7	8	9	R	H	E
Chunichi	0	0	0	0	0	1	0	1	0	2	7	0
Yomiuri	0	0	0	2	0	0	0	4	X	6	11	1
WP: Marc Kroon (1–1) LP: Akifumi Takahashi (0–1); Home runs: CHU: Tyrone Woods (3); YOM: Alex Ramírez (2)
