= 2008 Pacific League Climax Series =

Japanese baseball series

First stage
Team (Wins)		Manager	Season
Hokkaido Nippon-Ham Fighters (2)		Masataka Nashida	73–69–2 (.514), 4 GB
Orix Buffaloes (0)		Daijiro Oishi	75–68–1 (.524), 2½ GB
- Dates: October 11–12

Second stage
Team (Wins)		Manager	Season
Saitama Seibu Lions (4)		Hisanobu Watanabe	76–64–4, .543, 2½ GA
Hokkaido Nippon-Ham Fighters (2)		Masataka Nashida	73–69–2, .514, 4 GB
- Dates: October 17–22
- MVP: Hideaki Wakui (Seibu)

The 2008 Pacific League Climax Series (PLCS) consisted of two consecutive series, Stage 1 being a best-of-three series and Stage 2 being a best-of-six with the top seed being awarded a one-win advantage. The winner of the series advanced to the 2008 Japan Series, where they competed against the 2008 Central League Climax Series winner. The top three regular-season finishers played in the two series. The PLCS began on with the first game of Stage 1 on October 11 and ended with the final game of Stage 2 on October 22.

== First stage ==
=== Summary ===
Hokkaido Nippon-Ham Fighters won the series, 2–0.

Game	Date	Score	Location	Time	Attendance
1	October 11	Hokkaido Nippon-Ham Fighters – 4, Orix Buffaloes – 1	Kyocera Dome	3:16	25,532
2	October 12	Hokkaido Nippon-Ham Fighters – 7, Orix Buffaloes – 2	Kyocera Dome	3:24	26,703

=== Game 1 ===
Saturday, October 11, 2008 at Kyocera Dome Osaka in Osaka, Osaka Prefecture
Team	1	2	3	4	5	6	7	8	9	R	H	E
Nippon-Ham	0	1	0	0	0	3	0	0	0	4	5	1
Orix	0	0	0	0	0	0	0	1	0	1	9	0
WP: Yu Darvish (1–0) LP: Kazuki Kondo (0–1); Home runs: NIP: Terrmel Sledge (1); ORX: None

=== Game 2 ===
Sunday, October 12, 2008 at Kyocera Dome Osaka in Osaka, Osaka Prefecture
Team	1	2	3	4	5	6	7	8	9	R	H	E
Nippon-Ham	0	2	0	0	1	0	4	0	0	7	13	0
Orix	0	0	0	1	0	0	0	1	0	2	6	2
WP: Shugo Fujii (1–0) LP: Satoshi Komatsu (0–1); Home runs: NIP: Jason Botts (1); ORX: None

== Second stage ==
=== Summary ===
Saitama Seibu Lions won the series, 4–2*.

Game	Date	Score	Location	Time	Attendance
1	October 17	Hokkaido Nippon-Ham Fighters – 3, Saitama Seibu Lions – 10	Omiya Stadium	3:23	20,500
2	October 18	Hokkaido Nippon-Ham Fighters – 5, Saitama Seibu Lions – 0	Seibu Dome	2:56	30,918
3	October 19	Hokkaido Nippon-Ham Fighters – 7, Saitama Seibu Lions – 4	Seibu Dome	3:25	33,078
4	October 21	Hokkaido Nippon-Ham Fighters – 4, Saitama Seibu Lions – 9	Seibu Dome	3:07	18,704
5	October 22	Hokkaido Nippon-Ham Fighters – 0, Saitama Seibu Lions – 9	Seibu Dome	2:52	21,731

* The Pacific League regular season champion is given a one-game advantage in the Second Stage.

=== Game 1 ===
Friday, October 17, 2008 at Omiya Park Baseball Stadium in Saitama, Saitama Prefecture
Team	1	2	3	4	5	6	7	8	9	R	H	E
Nippon-Ham	0	0	0	0	1	0	0	0	2	3	10	0
Seibu	1	0	5	4	0	0	0	0	X	10	13	1
WP: Hideaki Wakui (1–0) LP: Ryan Glynn (0–1); Home runs: NIP: Terrmel Sledge (1); SEI: Hiroyuki Nakajima (2), Taketoshi Goto (1)

=== Game 2 ===
Saturday, October 18, 2008 at Seibu Dome in Tokorozawa, Saitama Prefecture
Team	1	2	3	4	5	6	7	8	9	R	H	E
Nippon-Ham	0	0	1	4	0	0	0	0	0	5	9	0
Seibu	0	0	0	0	0	0	0	0	0	0	3	0
WP: Yu Darvish (1–0) LP: Takayuki Kishi (0–1); Home runs: NIP: Makoto Kaneko (1); SEI: None

=== Game 3 ===
Sunday, October 19, 2008 at Seibu Dome in Tokorozawa, Saitama Prefecture
Team	1	2	3	4	5	6	7	8	9	R	H	E
Nippon-Ham	0	1	4	0	0	0	0	1	1	7	9	2
Seibu	0	0	0	0	2	1	0	0	1	4	7	1
WP: Masaru Takeda (1–0) LP: Kazuyuki Hoashi (0–1); Home runs: NIP: Terrmel Sledge (2); SEI: None

=== Game 4 ===
Tuesday, October 21, 2008 at Seibu Dome in Tokorozawa, Saitama Prefecture
Team	1	2	3	4	5	6	7	8	9	R	H	E
Nippon-Ham	0	0	0	0	0	0	3	0	1	4	7	0
Seibu	4	1	2	0	0	0	1	1	X	9	15	1
WP: Kazuhisa Ishii (1–0) LP: Brian Sweeney (0–1); Home runs: NIP: Jason Botts (1); SEI: Toru Hosokawa (1), Shogo Akada (1)

=== Game 5 ===
Wednesday, October 22, 2008 at Seibu Dome in Tokorozawa, Saitama Prefecture
Team	1	2	3	4	5	6	7	8	9	R	H	E
Nippon-Ham	0	0	0	0	0	0	0	0	0	0	3	0
Seibu	0	1	4	0	0	0	1	3	X	9	12	0
WP: Hideaki Wakui (2–0) LP: Ryan Glynn (0–2); Home runs: NIP: None; SEI: Taketoshi Goto (2)
