= Taketoshi =

- Gender: Male

Origin
- Origin: Japanese
- Meaning: Different meanings depending on the kanji used

Taketoshi (written: 武敏) is a masculine Japanese given name. Notable people with the name include:

- Taketoshi Goto (後藤 武敏) (born 1980), Japanese baseball player
- Taketoshi Naitō (内藤 武敏) (1926–2012), Japanese actor
