= Shota Omine =

Japanese baseball player (born 1991)

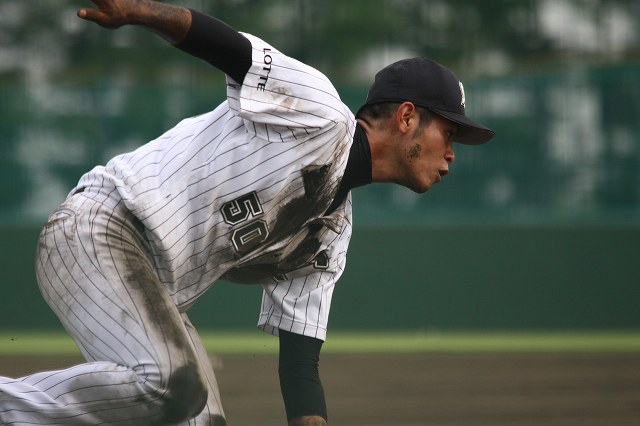
- Omine with the Chiba Lotte Marines
- Infielder
- Born: September 17, 1991 (age 34); Ishigaki, Okinawa, Japan
- Batted: Right Threw: Right

NPB debut
- August 1, 2014, for the Chiba Lotte Marines

Last NPB appearance
- May 26, 2018, for the Chiba Lotte Marines

NPB statistics (through 2018)
- Batting average: .210
- Home runs: 7
- RBI: 35
- Stats at Baseball Reference

Teams
- Chiba Lotte Marines (2010–2018)

Shota Omine (大嶺 翔太, Omine Shota; born September 17, 1991 in Ishigaki, Okinawa, Japan) is a retired professional Japanese baseball player. He played infield for the Chiba Lotte Marines.

His elder brother Yuta is also a professional baseball player currently playing for Marines.
