= Ryota Wakiya =

Japanese baseball player (born 1981)

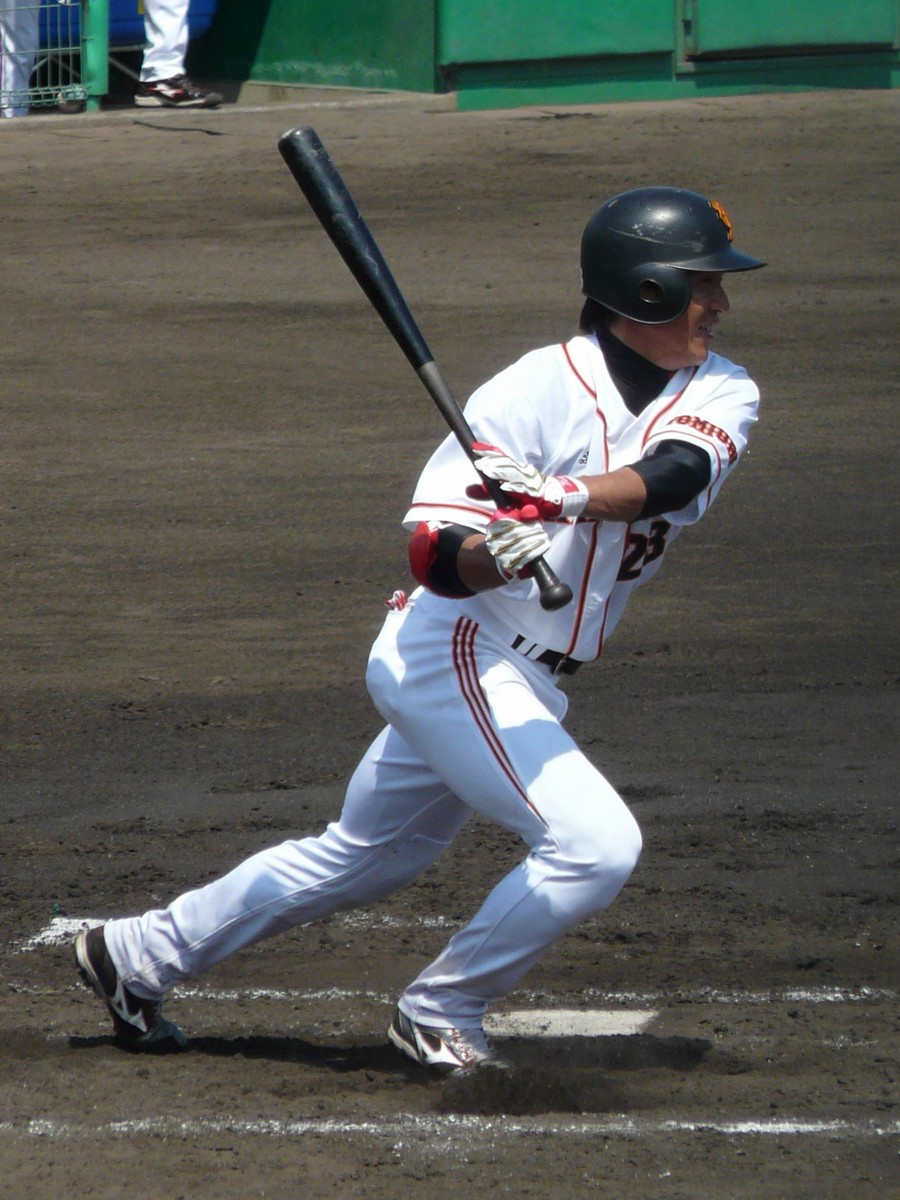
- Wakiya with the Yomiuri Giants

Yomiuri Giants – No. 104
- Infielder / Coach
- Born: November 4, 1981 (age 44); Ōita, Ōita, Japan
- Batted: Left Threw: Right

NPB debut
- June 4, 2006, for the Yomiuri Giants

Last NPB appearance
- October 1, 2017, for the Yomiuri Giants

NPB statistics (through 2017 season)
- Batting average: .255
- RBIs: 159
- Home runs: 18

Teams
- As player: Yomiuri Giants (2006–2013, 2016–2018); Saitama Seibu Lions (2014–2015); As coach: Yomiuri Giants (2023-)

Career highlights and awards
- 2009 Japan Series champion; 2009 CLCS MVP

Ryota Wakiya (脇谷 亮太, Wakiya Ryota; born November 4, 1981 in Ōita, Ōita, Japan) is a Japanese Nippon Professional Baseball player for the Yomiuri Giants in Japan's Central League.
