= Matt Kroon =

American baseball player (born 1996)

Fargo-Moorhead RedHawks – No. 2
- Infielder
- Born: December 5, 1996 (age 29); Scottsdale, Arizona, U.S.
- Bats: Right Throws: Right

Matthew James Kroon (born December 5, 1996) is an American professional baseball infielder for the Fargo-Moorhead RedHawks of the American Association of Professional Baseball.

== Early life ==
The son of MLB player Marc Kroon, Matt grew up in Scottsdale, Arizona, and attended Horizon High School. He received two all-state selections there and batted .412 as a senior; Kroon was selected in the 38th round of the 2015 Major League Baseball draft by the Cincinnati Reds. Rather than sign with the Reds, Kroon played college baseball with the Oregon Ducks, batting .184 in 35 games with the team in his first year. He transferred to Central Arizona College as a sophomore and posted 20 runs batted in (RBI) and two home runs while batting .266 in 46 games for the school.

Kroon was selected by the Philadelphia Phillies in the 30th round of the 2017 Major League Baseball draft, but remained in school, transferring a second time to the Oklahoma State Cowboys. He played 57 games with the Cowboys and batted .300 with 11 home runs and 39 RBI.

== Professional career ==
=== Philadelphia Phillies ===
Kroon was drafted in the 18th round, with the 527th overall selection, of the 2018 Major League Baseball draft by the Philadelphia Phillies. He split his first professional season between the rookie-level Gulf Coast League Phillies and Low-A Williamsport Crosscutters, hitting .287 in 42 games. Kroon made 106 appearances split between the Single-A Lakewood BlueClaws and High-A Clearwater Threshers in 2019, slashing .242/.313/.361 with five home runs, 36 RBI, and 18 stolen bases.

Kroon did not play in a game in 2020 due to the cancellation of the minor league season because of the COVID-19 pandemic. Kroon promoted to the Double-A Reading Fightin Phils for the 2021 season. In 45 appearances for Reading, he batted .301/.361/.466 with five home runs and 22 RBI. Kroon tore his ACL while playing for Reading early on in the 2022 season, resulting in him missing all but two games.

Kroon returned to action in 2023 and played with the High-A Jersey Shore BlueClaws, Reading, and the Triple-A Lehigh Valley IronPigs. In 97 appearances split between the three affiliates, he batted a combined .326/.399/.526 with career-highs in home runs (11), RBI (58), and stolen bases (26). Kroon began the 2024 season with Triple-A Lehigh Valley, where he hit .251/.325/.441 with 11 home runs, 38 RBI, and 15 stolen bases across 80 contests.

In 2025, Kroon played in 26 games for Jersey Shore and Lehigh Valley, hitting .217/.327/.337 with two home runs, 10 RBI, and nine stolen bases. Kroon was released by the Phillies organization on August 4, 2025.

=== Tigres de Quintana Roo ===
On April 16, 2026, Kroon signed with the Fargo-Moorhead RedHawks of the American Association of Professional Baseball. On May 21, his contract was transferred to the Tigres de Quintana Roo of the Mexican League, and he officially signed with club on June 1. In six appearances for Quintana Too, he went 1-for-10 (.100) at the plate and struck out five times. On June 15, Kroon was released by the Tigres.

=== Fargo-Moorhead RedHawks ===
On July 18, 2026, Kroon signed with the Fargo-Moorhead RedHawks of the American Association of Professional Baseball.
