= Atsushi Fujii =

Japanese baseball player

Atsushi Fujii 藤井 淳志
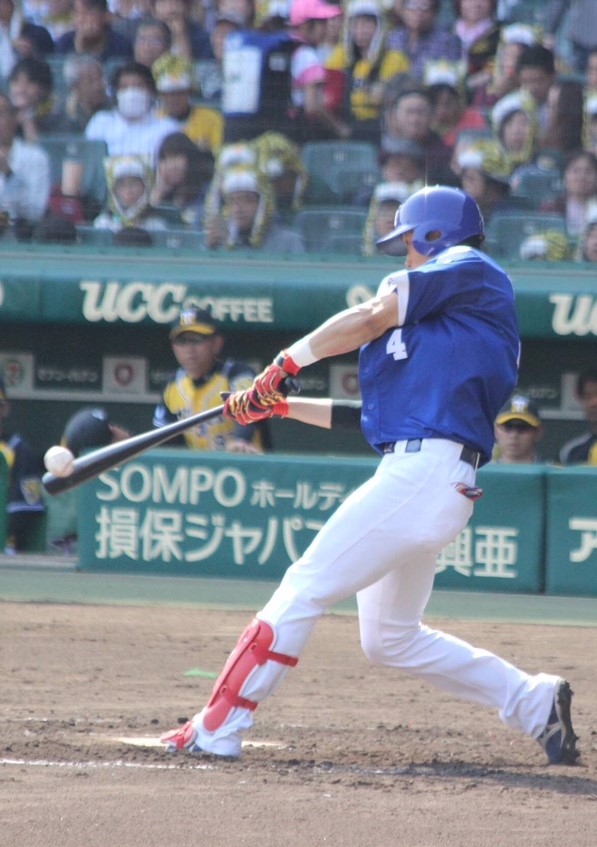
- Fujii with the Chunichi Dragons
- Outfielder
- Born: May 20, 1981 (age 43); Toyohashi, Aichi Prefecture
- Bats: Right Throws: Right

NPB debut
- March 31, 2006, for the Chunichi Dragons

NPB statistics (through 2020 season)
- Batting average: .262
- Hits: 634
- Home runs: 45
- RBI: 273
- Stolen base: 46

Teams
- Chunichi Dragons (2006–2021)

Atsushi Fujii (藤井 淳志, born May 20, 1981) is a retired Japanese professional outfielder. He spent his career playing for the Chunichi Dragons in Japan's Nippon Professional Baseball.
