= Yudai Kawai =

Japanese baseball player

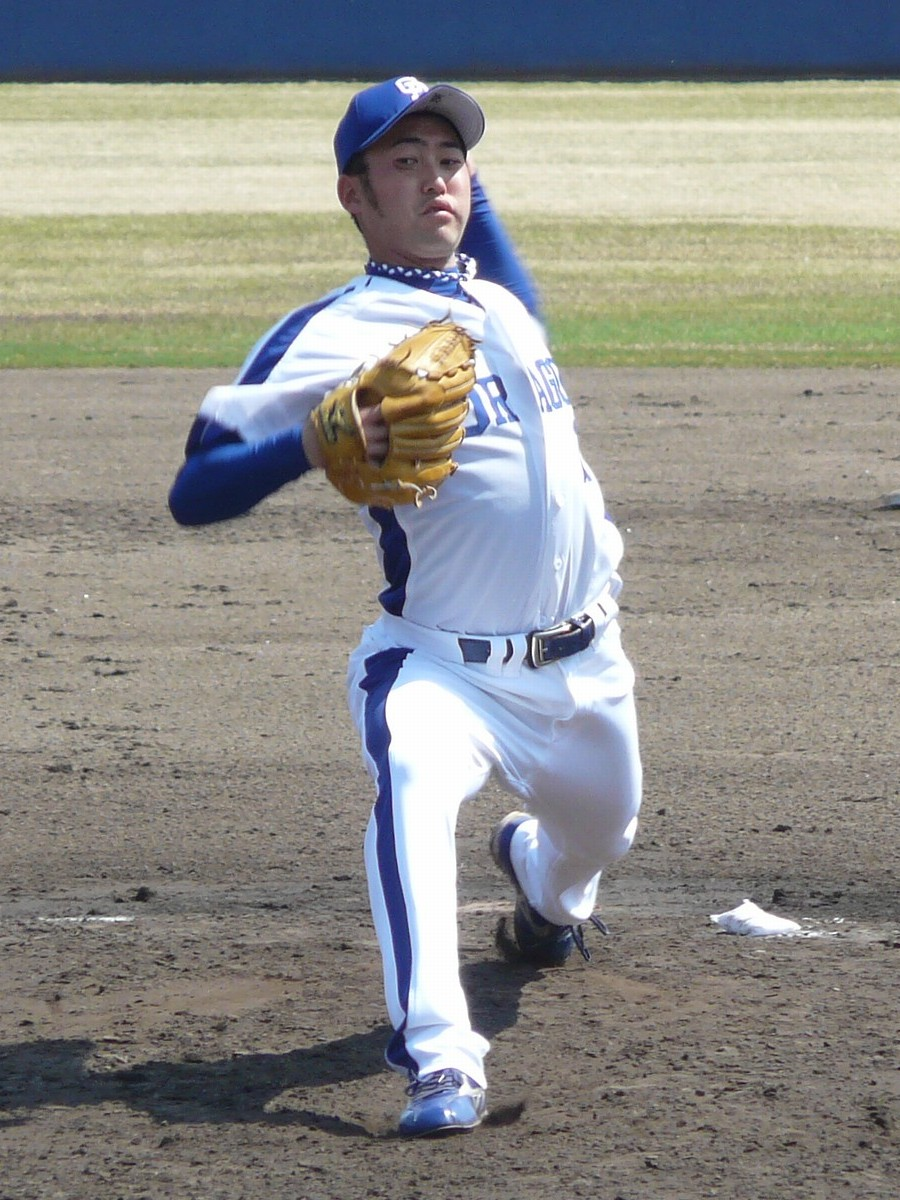
- Kawai with the Chunichi Dragons
- Pitcher
- Born: 17 June 1980 (age 45); Kitasaku District, Nagano, Japan
- Bats: Left Throws: Left

debut
- April 20, 2005, for the Chunichi Dragons

NPB statistics (through 2016)
- Win-Loss: 28-31
- ERA: 3.44
- Strikeouts: 247

Teams
- Chunichi Dragons (2005–2016)

Career highlights and awards
- 1x NPB All-Star selection (2009)

Yudai Kawai (川井 雄太, Kawai Yudai; born June 17, 1980 in Kitasaku District, Nagano, Japan) is a retired professional Japanese baseball player. He played pitcher for the Chunichi Dragons.

Kawai announced his retirement on 23 September 2016, and played his final game for the Dragons against the Hanshin Tigers at Nagoya Dome pitching 5 straight deliveries in a row to retire the pinch hitting Shunsuke Fujikawa.
