= Ryohei Kawamoto =

Japanese baseball player (born 1982)

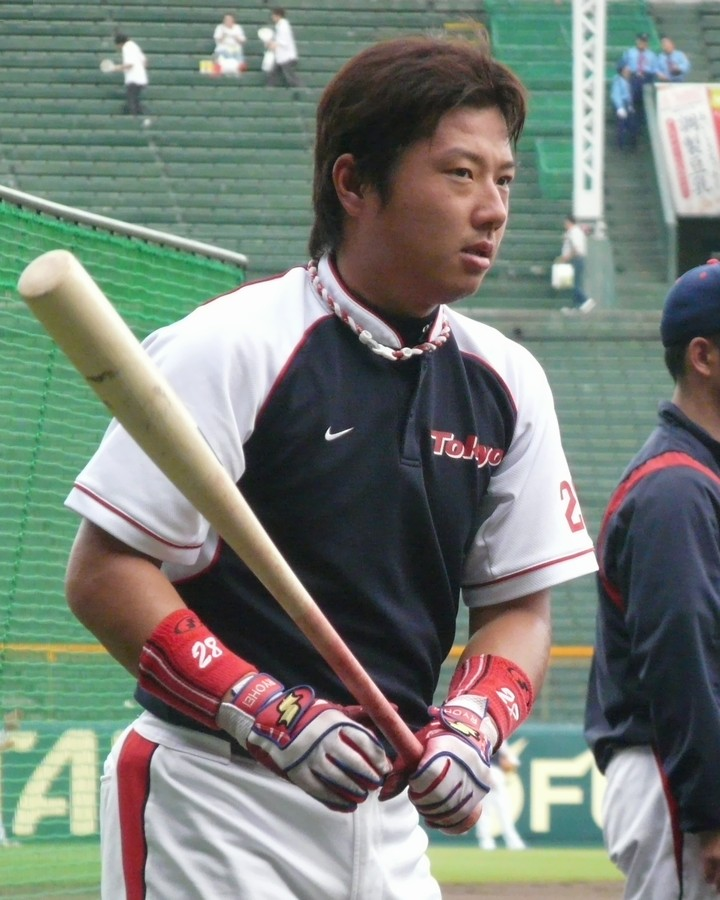
- Kawamoto with the Tokyo Yakult Swallows
- Catcher
- Born: April 28, 1982 (age 43); Kure, Hiroshima, Japan
- Batted: Right Threw: Right

NPB debut
- July 7, 2007, for the Tokyo Yakult Swallows

Last NPB appearance
- May 28, 2016, for the Tohoku Rakuten Golden Eagles

NPB statistics
- Batting average: .207
- Hits: 147
- Home runs: 19
- RBI: 79
- Stolen bases: 9

Teams
- Yakult Swallows/Tokyo Yakult Swallows (2005–2012); Chiba Lotte Marines (2013–2015); Tohoku Rakuten Golden Eagles (2016)

Ryohei Kawamoto (川本 良平, Kawamoto Ryohei; born April 28, 1982 in Kure, Hiroshima, Japan) is a professional Japanese baseball player. He plays catcher for the Tohoku Rakuten Golden Eagles.
