= Kenichi Matsuoka =

Japanese baseball player

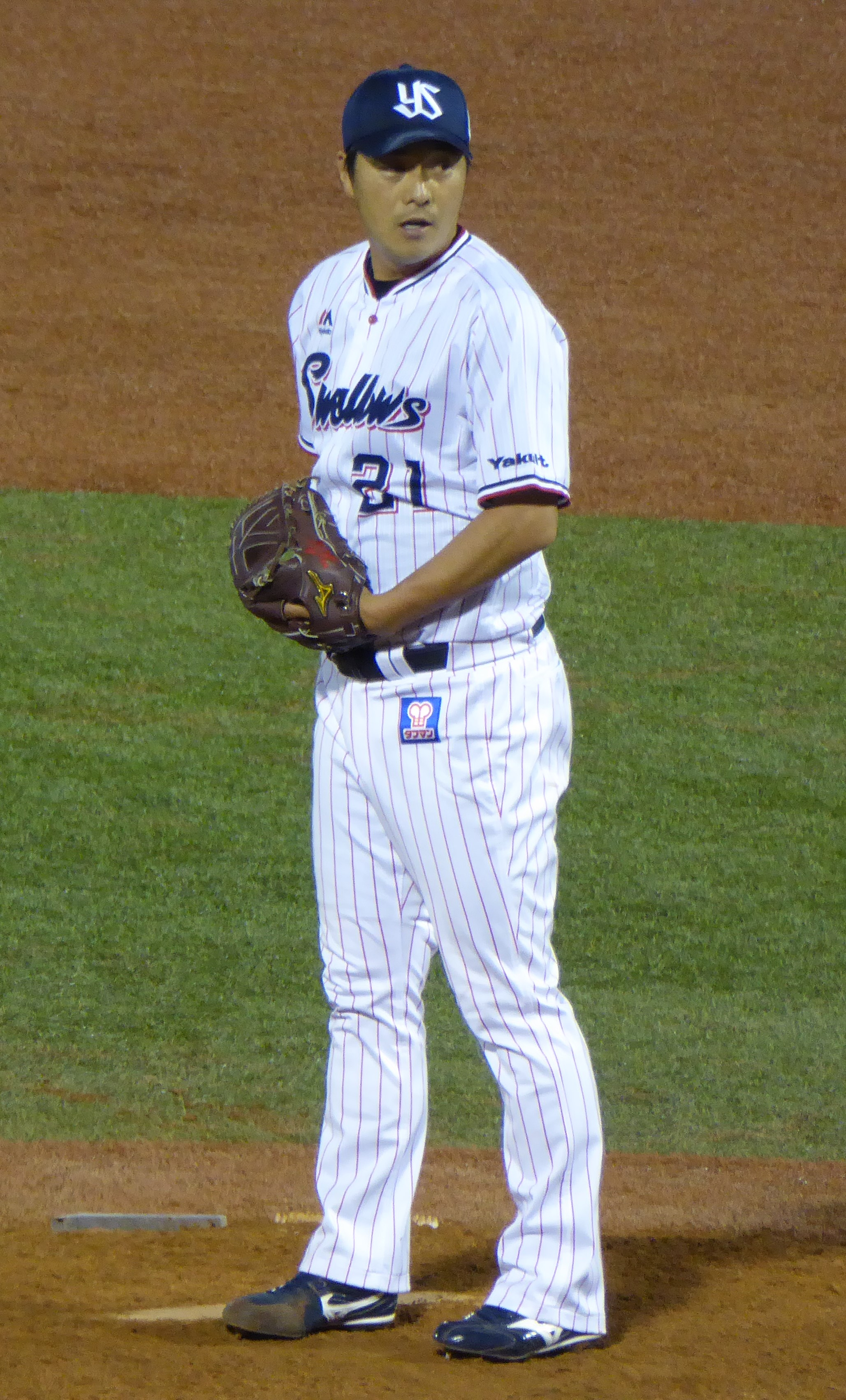
- Pitcher / Coach
- Born: June 7, 1982 (age 43); Tamana, Kumamoto, Japan
- Batted: Right Threw: Right

NPB debut
- September 13, 2005, for the Yakult Swallows

Last appearance
- October 8, 2018, for the Tokyo Yakult Swallows

NPB statistics
- Win–loss record: 32-25
- Earned Run Average: 3.78
- Strikeouts: 482
- Saves: 4

Teams
- As player: Tokyo Yakult Swallows (2005–2018); As coach: Tokyo Yakult Swallows (2019–2024)

Kenichi Matsuoka (松岡 健一, Matsuoka Ken'ichi; born June 7, 1982) is a professional Japanese baseball player and coach. He pitched for the Tokyo Yakult Swallows from 2005 through 2018, and has been a pitching coach for the Swallows since the 2019 season.

Matsuoka played the one season with the Waikiki BeachBoys of the now defunct Hawaii Winter Baseball league, an MLB off-season developmental league that sought to develop Japanese players much like the Arizona Fall League.

Matsuoka was picked up by the Swallows in 2005 as a pre-round draft pick from Kyushu Tokai University.
