= Takehiko Oshimoto =

Japanese baseball player (born 1982)

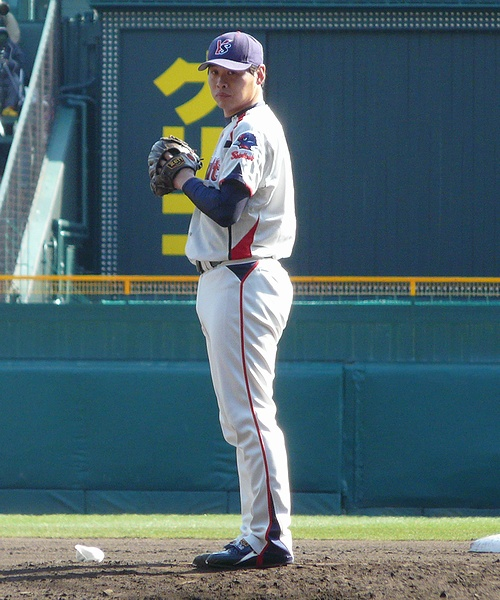
- Pitcher
- Born: October 28, 1982 (age 43); Nagareyama, Chiba, Japan
- Bats: Right Throws: Right

debut
- April 9, 2004, for the Hokkaido Nippon-Ham Fighters

Teams
- Hokkaido Nippon-Ham Fighters (2004–2007); Tokyo Yakult Swallows (2008–2014)

Takehiko Oshimoto (押本 健彦, Oshimoto Takehiko; born October 28, 1982 in Nagareyama, Chiba, Japan) is a former professional Japanese baseball player.
