= Yuta Omine =

Japanese baseball player

Yūta Ōmine
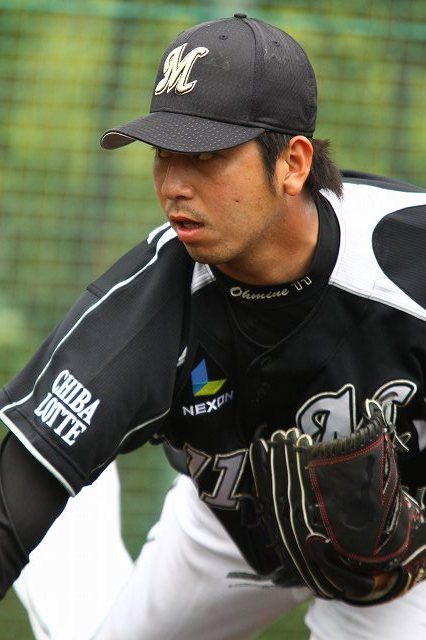
- Ohmine with the Chiba Lotte Marines
- Pitcher
- Born: June 16, 1988 (age 37); Ishigaki, Okinawa, Japan
- Bats: Left Throws: Right

NPB debut
- April 30, 2007, for the Chiba Lotte Marines

NPB statistics (through 2020 season)
- Win–loss record: 28–34
- ERA: 4.73
- Strikeouts: 313
- Stats at Baseball Reference

Teams
- Chiba Lotte Marines (2007–2021); Chunichi Dragons (2022)

Yuta Omine (大嶺 祐太, Ōmine Yūta; born June 16, 1988 in Ishigaki, Okinawa, Japan) is a Nippon Professional Baseball player. He previously played for 14 years with the Chiba Lotte Marines.

His younger brother Shota was also a professional baseball player for the Marines.

On 9 December 2021, it was confirmed Omine would be signing a development contract with the Chunichi Dragons after his release from the Marines.
