= Taketoshi Goto =

Japanese baseball player and coach (born 1980)

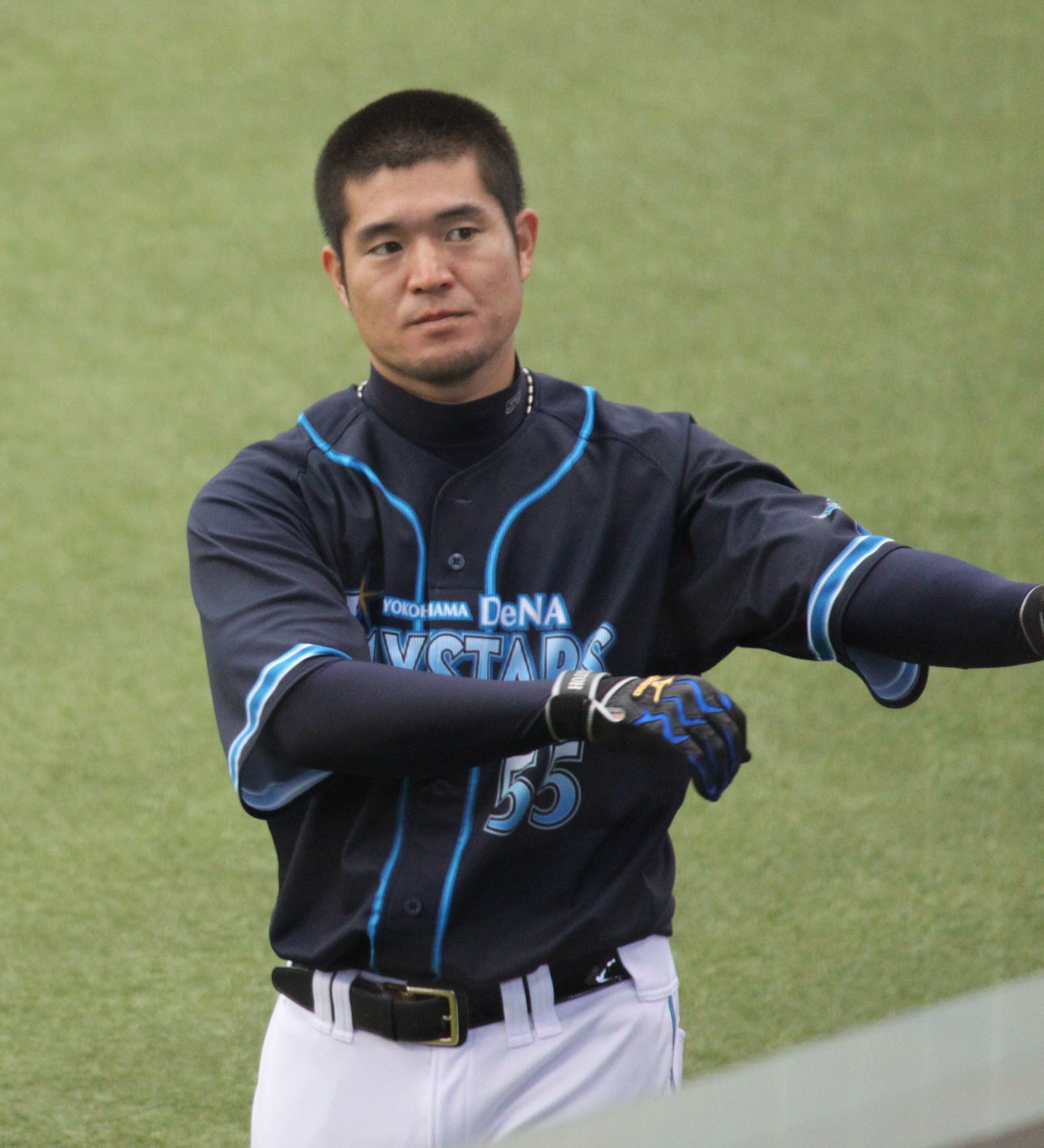
- Goto with the Yokohama DeNA BayStars
- Infielder
- Born: June 5, 1980 (age 46); Hamamatsu, Shizuoka, Japan
- Batted: Right Threw: Right

NPB debut
- March 28, 2003, for the Seibu Lions

Last NPB appearance
- September 22, 2018, for the Yokohama DeNA BayStars

Career statistics
- Batting average: .254
- Home runs: 52
- Runs batted in: 184
- Stats at Baseball Reference

Teams
- As player: Seibu Lions/Saitama Seibu Lions (2003–2011); Yokohama DeNA BayStars (2012–2018); As coach: Tohoku Rakuten Golden Eagles (2019–2025)

Taketoshi "Gomez" Goto (後藤G武敏, Goto Gomesu Taketoshi; born June 5, 1980 in Hamamatsu, Shizuoka, Japan) is a former Japanese baseball player. He played infield for the Saitama Seibu Lions and Yokohama DeNA BayStars.
