= Yoshinori Sato =

Japanese baseball player (born 1989)

Yoshinori Sato 由規
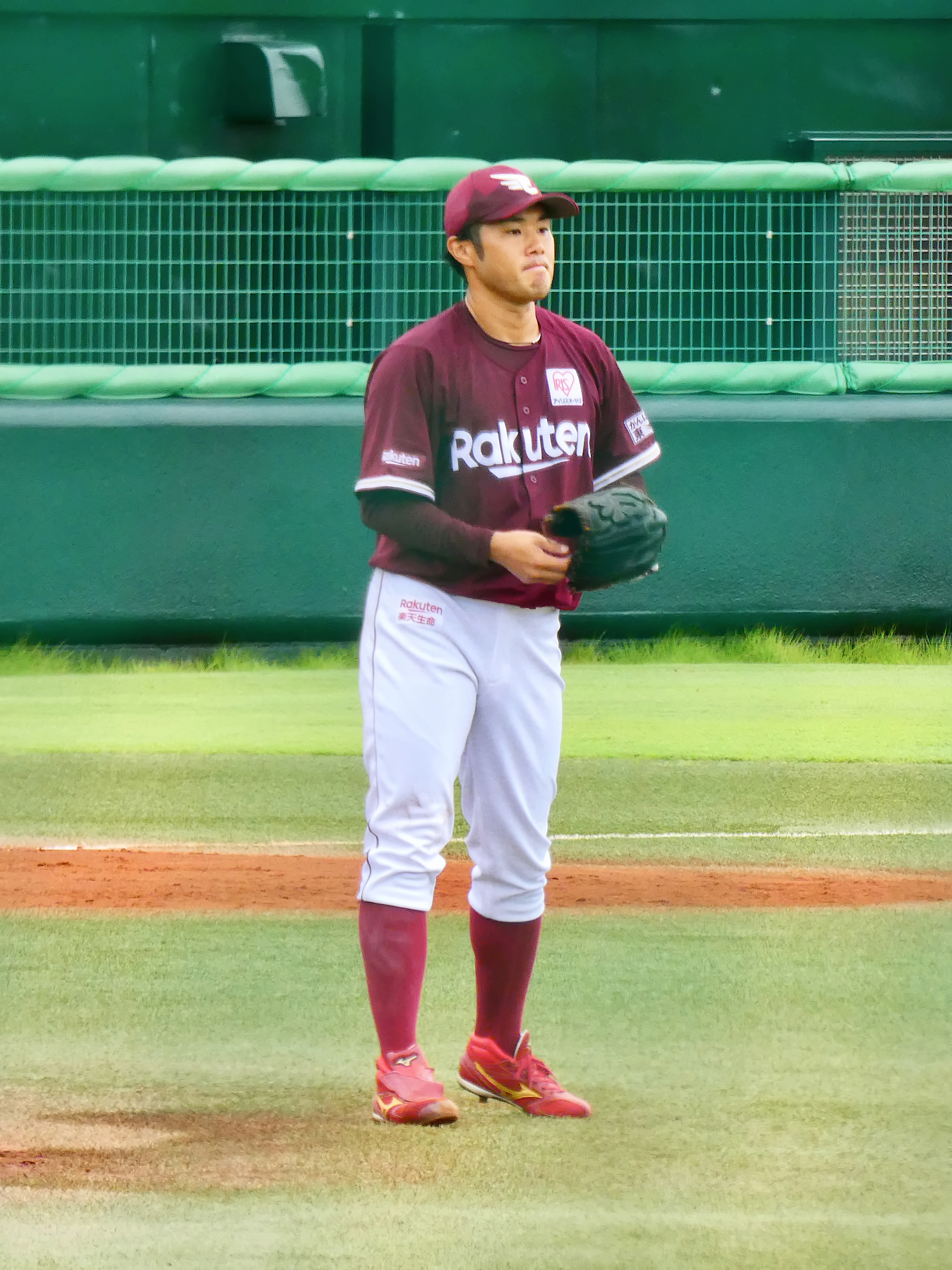
- Yoshinori with the Tohoku Rakuten Golden Eagles

Tokyo Yakult Swallows – No. 91
- Pitcher / Coach
- Born: 5 December 1989 (age 36); Sendai, Miyagi, Japan
- Batted: Left Threw: Right

Professional debut
- NPB: 30 August, 2008, for the Tokyo Yakult Swallows
- CPBL: 28 August, 2023, for the Rakuten Monkeys

Last appearance
- NPB: 26 September, 2019, for the Tohoku Rakuten Golden Eagles
- CPBL: 28 August, 2023, for the Rakuten Monkeys

NPB statistics
- Win–loss record: 32–36
- Earned run average: 3.66
- Strikeouts: 454

CPBL statistics
- Win–loss record: 0–0
- Earned run average: 27.00
- Strikeouts: 1
- Stats at Baseball Reference

Teams
- As player: Tokyo Yakult Swallows (2008–2018); Tohoku Rakuten Golden Eagles (2019–2020); Rakuten Monkeys (2023); As coach: Tokyo Yakult Swallows (2025–present)

Yoshinori Sato (佐藤 由規, Satō Yoshinori; born 5 December 1989) also known as Yoshinori (由規) is a Japanese former professional baseball pitcher. He played in Nippon Professional Baseball (NPB) for the Tokyo Yakult Swallows and Tohoku Rakuten Golden Eagles, and in the Chinese Professional Baseball League (CPBL) for the Rakuten Monkeys.

== Early life ==
Yoshinori was born in Sendai, the capital city of Miyagi Prefecture. His parents and older brother convinced him to begin playing baseball in the fourth grade. (His brother, Hisanori, would later go on to Tohoku High School, where he would become batterymates with current Hokkaido Nippon-Ham Fighters right-hander Yu Darvish as the team's backup catcher.) He was chosen to the Little League Japanese national team in his first year (the equivalent of seventh grade in the United States) at Sendai Municipal North Sendai Junior High School and pitched a no-hitter against the Russian team, but did not play for his school's baseball team, instead choosing to join the school's track and field team while playing for a Little Senior team instead.

== High school career ==
=== 2005 to Spring 2007 ===
Yoshinori went on to enroll at Sendai Ikuei Gakuen High School in 2005. Though he failed to reach even 130 km/h (81 mph) when he entered high school and was initially made the backup third baseman, he was clocking 140 km/h (87 mph) by the fall of his first year (tenth grade) and began to draw local attention as a pitcher. He led the school to a berth in the 88th National High School Baseball Championship in the summer of his junior year (2006), going the distance while striking out 11 en route to a 5–1 win over Tokushima Commercial High School in the first round as the team's ace pitcher on 7 August. However, he allowed four runs on seven hits and five walks despite striking out 13 against Nihon University Yamagata Senior High School in the next round, ultimately being charged with the decision in a 6–3 loss on 13 August.

Sendai Ikuei Gakuen High won the Tohoku Regional Tournament that fall, securing a berth in the 79th National High School Baseball Invitational Tournament that would be held in the spring of 2007. However, while Sato pitched well against Tokoha Gakuen Kikugawa High School in the first round (now as a senior) on 23 March, striking out 14 while allowing just two runs and clocking 150 km/h (93 mph), his team was held to just one run in a disappointing 2–1 loss and first-round exit (Tokoha Gakuen Kikugawa High went on to become the tournament champions).

=== Summer 2007 ===
Already viewed as one of the top high school pitchers in the country, Yoshinori pitched well in the regional Miyagi Tournament that summer, throwing 226 pitches in fifteen shutout innings in the finals against rival Tohoku High School on 31 July in what ended in a scoreless tie (as per tournament regulations). He started the rematch that ensued the next day (1 August), throwing 148 pitches while holding Tohoku High to two runs in a 6–2 complete game win and leading the school to a third straight appearance in a national tournament.

Yoshinori took the mound against Chiben Gakuen Wakayama Senior High School in the first round of the 89th National High School Baseball Championship that followed on 9 August, holding the team to just two runs while striking out 17 in a 4–2 complete-game win. While he gave up a home run to junior and noted cleanup hitter Masaki Sakaguchi (currently a third baseman for Tokai University) in the sixth inning, he threw a pitch that the radar gun at Koshien Stadium clocked at 154 km/h (96 mph) in Sakaguchi's next at-bat in the eighth, tying the highest speed ever recorded in the tournament (since the radar gun began being used in 1980) marked by current Yokohama BayStars right-hander Hayato Terahara as a senior for Nichinan Gakuen High School in 2001. He struck Sakaguchi out looking in that at-bat, throwing a total of 19 pitches clocked at 150 km/h (93 mph) or above in the same game.

In the fourth inning of the second-round game against Chiben Gakuen Senior High School (the Nara champions) on 15 August, Yoshinori threw a pitch clocked at 155 km/h (96 mph), setting a new tournament record for pitch speed (as per official stadium radar gun readings). He gave up five runs in the very next inning, however, allowing eight hits and five walks in a 5–2 complete game loss. While he made three appearances in national tournaments during his three-year high school career, he never succeeded in getting past the second round.

Yoshinori was chosen to play in the U.S.−Japan High School Baseball Tournament (organized by the Japanese Educational Resource Center in conjunction with the Major League Baseball Urban Youth Academy) as a member of the Japanese team later that summer, clocking a new personal-high 157 km/h (98 mph) during the tournament.

Yoshinori was one of the most highly touted players going into the 2007 NPB high school draft, attracting the attention of scouts for not only his fastball but also his hard slider and being dubbed one of the "High School Big Three" along with Osaka Tōin Senior High School slugger Sho Nakata and Narita High School right-hander Yuki Karakawa. The Sendai-based Tohoku Rakuten Golden Eagles, Swallows, BayStars, Chunichi Dragons and Yomiuri Giants all selected Sato with their first-round picks, but the Swallows drew the winning straw, signing him to a base salary of 15 million yen, a signing bonus of 100 million yen and additional performance-based incentives and presenting him the uniform number 11 on 11 November.

== Professional career ==
=== Tokyo Yakult Swallows ===
==== 2008 ====
In 2008, his rookie season, Yoshinori was assigned to the Swallows' ichigun (Japanese equivalent of "major league") team for Spring training, but complained of pain in his left ankle in late February. While the condition was deemed minor and Sato was cleared to play in preseason games, he went 0–2 with a 13.50 ERA, allowing 14 hits in just six innings, and was sent down to the nigun team ("minor league" or "farm team") for the season opener. He focused on rehabbing his ankle, coming on in relief in a game against the Giants on 13 April and pitching one scoreless inning in his Eastern League debut.

Yoshinori went on to earn a spot in the nigun team's starting rotation, going 8–5 with a 4.17 ERA in 15 appearances and striking out 71 in 77 2/3 innings before being called up to the ichigun team for the first time in late August. He made his professional debut on 30 August, starting a game against the BayStars but giving up six runs (five earned) on six hits and lasting just 1 2/3 innings (the Swallows came back to win the game 9–8).

Yoshinori made his second start in a game against the Giants on 6 September, allowing three runs over six innings while striking out eight for the first win of his professional career and snapping the Swallows' eight-game losing streak to the Giants (prompting the Japanese media to dub him the "Giants Killer"). However, he was charged with his first loss in his next start against the Giants on 14 September, allowing three runs over six innings while striking out seven (he knocked in his first career RBI on a sacrifice fly in the fifth inning).

On 8 October, Yoshinori earned his second win of the season against the BayStars, holding the team to one run on just two hits over eight innings. While manager Shigeru Takada considered sending him to the mound for the ninth, he opted against it after Sato told pitching coach Daisuke Araki that he would rather retain his eligibility for the Most Valuable Rookie award for the following season than earn his first complete-game win. (Sato's innings pitched total at the ichigun level at the end of the eighth inning was 29 2/3, just under the 30 that a player must not have exceeded for his career to be eligible for the award.)

Yoshinori finished the year with a 2–1 record in five starts (six appearances), recording a 4.55 ERA while striking out 28 in 29 2/3 innings. His eight wins with the nigun team also led the Eastern League.

==== 2009 ====
Yoshinori pitched well in the 2009 pre-season, going 1–0 with one save with a 2.37 ERA in four appearances, and was considered one of the favorites for the Central League Most Valuable Rookie award going into the season. He threw a pitch clocked at 156 km/h (97 mph), his fastest since becoming a pro, in his third appearance against the Saitama Seibu Lions on 19 March.

Yoshinori took the mound in the Swallows' second game of the season against the Hanshin Tigers on 4 April, holding them to one run over six innings in his first win of the season, but gave up a career-high seven runs (all earned) on nine hits over just 4 1/3 innings in his next start against the BayStars on 10 April.

While he threw a pitch clocked at a personal-high 157 km/h (98 mph) in his fourth start against the BayStars on 26 April, Sato walked four and gave up three runs in just one inning in the shortest outing of his career. He was removed from the active roster and sent down to the minors the following day.

Yoshinori made 90 appearances for the Swallows from 2008 to 2018, posting a 32–36 record with 452 strikeouts in 533 1/3 innings pitched.

=== Tohoku Rakuten Golden Eagles ===
Yoshinori signed with the Tohoku Rakuten Golden Eagles of Nippon Professional Baseball (NPB) prior to the 2019 season. However, in two seasons with the club, he only made one appearance for the main team, tossing a scoreless inning with two strikeouts. On 2 December 2020, he became a free agent.

=== Rakuten Monkeys ===
After spending the 2021 and 2022 seasons out of baseball, Yoshinori signed with the Rakuten Monkeys of the Chinese Professional Baseball League (CPBL) on 2 July 2023. He made his CPBL debut on 28 August against the Fubon Guardians, allowing two runs (one earned) on three hits with one strikeout across 1/3 of an inning. Sato was released by Rakuten on 30 August.

On 8 October 2024, Sato announced his retirement from professional baseball.

== Pitching style ==
Listed at 179 cm (5 ft 10 in) and 80 kg (180 lb), Sato is relatively small for a prototypical power pitcher. He has a slightly unorthodox delivery, raising his left leg and bringing his glove down in front of his knee before pulling it into his chest and throwing from a three-quarters arm slot.

Yoshinori's four-seam fastball has exceptional velocity, usually sitting at 146 to 153 km/h (91 to 95 mph) and reaching 161 km/h (100 mph) with one pitch during the 2010 season. Yoshinori complements the pitch with a solid slider at low-80s and an occasional forkball. Sato can be considered as a two-pitch pitcher and still has a problem in his control.

Yoshinori has excellent stamina, clocking 151 km/h (94 mph) with his final pitch in his 154-pitch complete-game win against Chiben Gakuen Wakayama Senior High in the National High School Baseball Championship as an 18-year-old, but leaves room for improvement with his command.
