= Masahiko Morino =

Japanese baseball player and coach (born 1978)

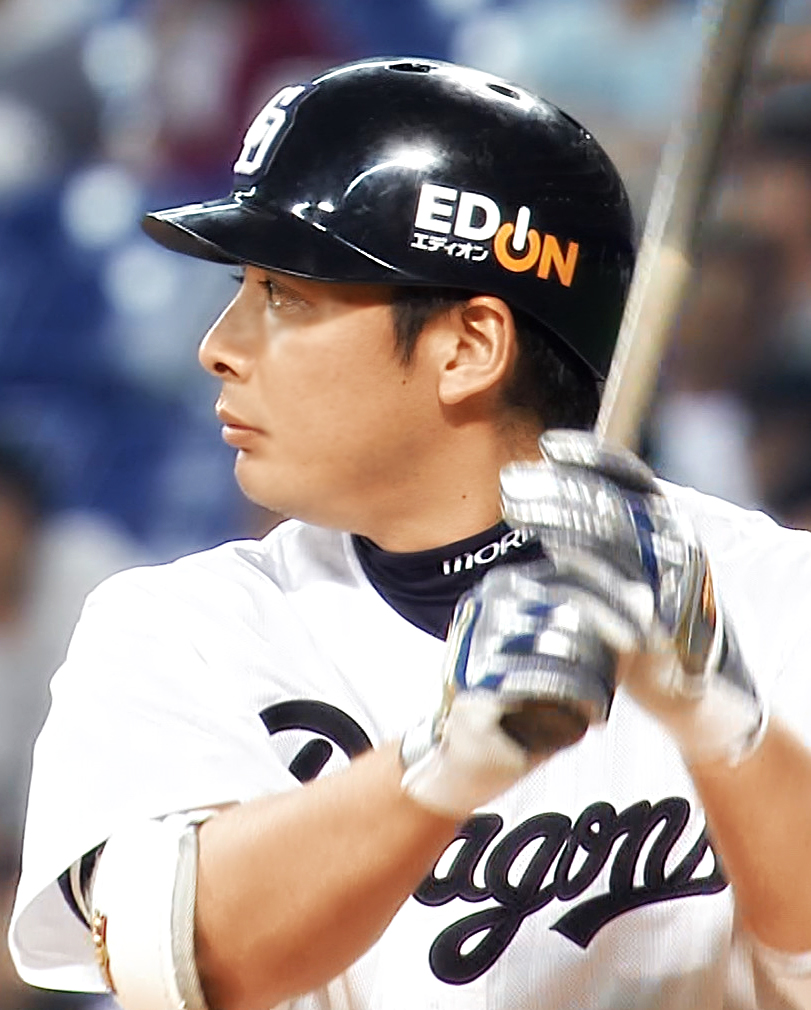
- Morino with the Chunichi Dragons

Chunichi Dragons – No. 78
- Infield/Batting Coach
- Born: July 28, 1978 (age 47)
- Batted: Left Threw: Right

NPB debut
- June 24, 1997, for the Chunichi Dragons

Last NPB appearance
- September 24, 2017, for the Chunichi Dragons

NPB statistics (through 2017)
- Batting average: .277
- Home runs: 165
- RBI: 782

Teams
- As player: Chunichi Dragons (1997–2017); As coach: Chunichi Dragons (2018–2019, 2022-Present)

Masahiko Morino (森野 将彦, Morino Masahiko; born July 28, 1978 in Yokohama, Kanagawa Prefecture) is a former Japanese professional baseball infielder for the Chunichi Dragons in Japan's Nippon Professional Baseball. He also played for Team Japan at the 2008 Olympics.

Morino retired in 2017 and served as the Dragons' second team batting coach until the end of the 2019 season.
