= Akifumi Takahashi =

Japanese baseball player

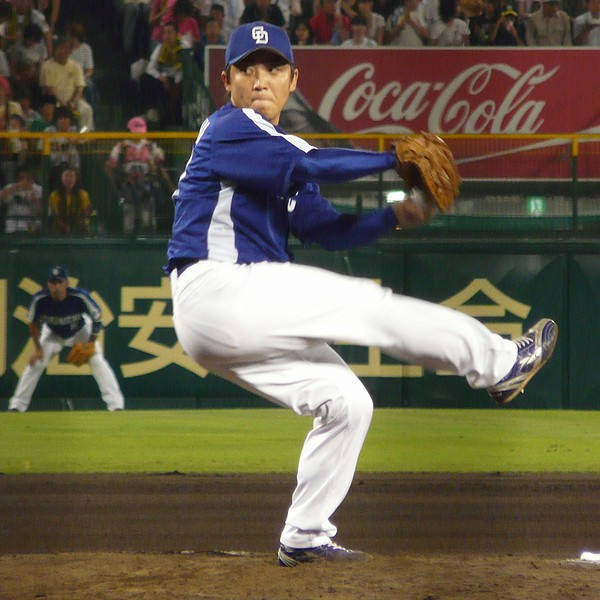
- Takahashi with the Chunichi Dragons
- Pitcher
- Born: May 29, 1983 (age 43); Fukui, Japan
- Batted: Left Threw: Left

NPB debut
- April 13, 2004, for the Chunichi Dragons

Last NPB appearance
- September 30, 2019, for the Hanshin Tigers

NPB statistics
- Win–loss record: 26–15
- Earned run average: 3.25
- Strikeouts: 457
- Stats at Baseball Reference

Teams
- Chunichi Dragons (2002–2015); Hanshin Tigers (2016–2019)

Akifumi Takahashi (高橋 聡文, Takahashi Akifumi; born May 29, 1983) is a Japanese former professional baseball pitcher. He played in Nippon Professional Baseball (NPB) for the Chunichi Dragons and Hanshin Tigers.

== Career ==
On September 30, 2019, Takahashi played his final NPB game before retiring. In 16 seasons for the Chunichi Dragons and Hanshin Tigers, he compiled a 26–15 record and 3.25 ERA with 457 strikeouts across 532 appearances.
