= Takashi Ogasawara =

Japanese baseball player & coach (born 1976)

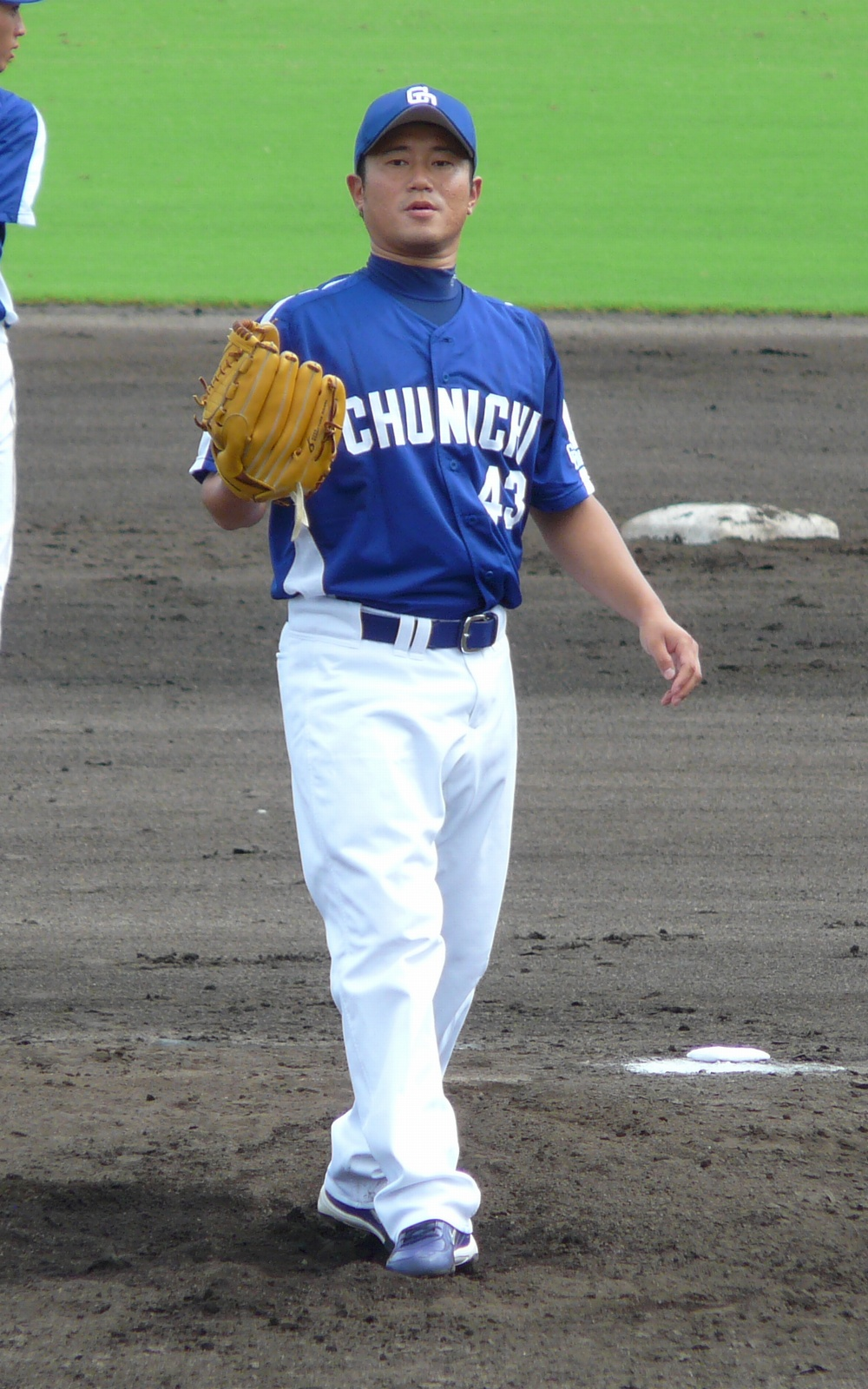

Fukuoka SoftBank Hawks – No. 73
- Pitcher / Coach
- Born: November 29, 1976 (age 49); Funabashi, Chiba, Japan
- Batted: Left Threw: Left

NPB debut
- June 10, 1999, for the Chunichi Dragons

Last NPB appearance
- October 5, 2012, for the Chunichi Dragons

NPB statistics
- Win–loss record: 31–40
- Earned Run Average: 4.20
- Strikeouts: 539
- Stats at Baseball Reference

Teams
- As player: Chunichi Dragons (1999– 2012); As coach: Chinichi Dragons (2013–2023); Fukuoka SoftBank Hawks (2024–present)

Career highlights and awards
- As player: Japan Series champion (2007); NPB All-Star selection (2008); As coach: Japan Series champion (2025)

Takashi Ogasawara (小笠原 孝, born November 29, 1976) is a Japanese professional baseball pitcher who currently serves as the second squad pitching coach for the Fukuoka SoftBank Hawks of Nippon Professional Baseball (NPB). He played in NPB for the Chunichi Dragons from 1999 to 2012.

== Professional career ==
=== Active player era ===
On November 20, 1993, Ogasawara was drafted third round pick by the Chunichi Dragons in the 1998 Nippon Professional Baseball draft.

In the 2008 season, he participated the All-Star Game for the first time in Mazda All-Star Game 2008.

On October 5, 2012, Ogasawara announced his retirement.

Ogasawara pitched in 191 games in 14 seasons overall, compiling with a 31-40 win–loss record, a 3 Holds, and a 4.20 ERA.

=== After retirement ===
Ogasawara had been the pitching coach of the Chunichi Dragon since the 2013 season.

On December 1, 2023, Ogasawara served as the second squad pitching coach of the Fukuoka SoftBank Hawks.
