= Takuya Asao =

Japanese baseball player

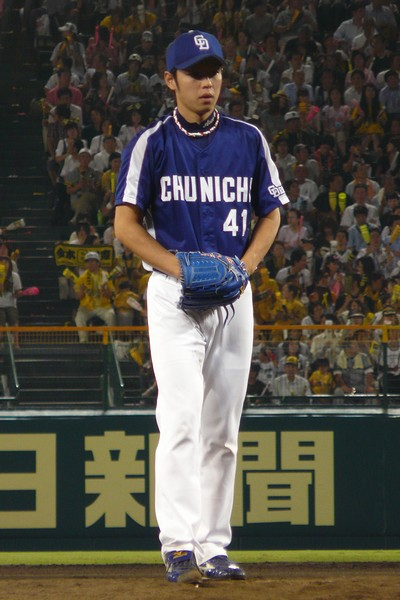

Chunichi Dragons – No. 82
- Pitching Coach/Pitcher
- Born: October 22, 1984 (age 41); Chita, Aichi, Japan
- Batted: Right Threw: Right

NPB debut
- April 10, 2007, for the Chunichi Dragons

Last NPB appearance
- September 29, 2018, for the Chunichi Dragons

NPB statistics (through 2018)
- Win–loss: 38–21
- ERA: 2.42
- Hold points: 200
- Saves: 23
- Strikeouts: 460
- Stats at Baseball Reference

Teams
- As player: Chunichi Dragons (2007–2018); As coach: Chunichi Dragons (2019–present)

Career highlights and awards
- Central League MVP (2011); Monthly MVP (July 2007); Central League Federation Special Award (2010); Golden Glove Award (2010); 2x Central League Best Relief Pitcher Award (2010-2011)

Takuya Asao (浅尾 拓也, Asao Takuya; born October 22, 1984 in Chita, Aichi) is a retired Nippon Professional Baseball pitcher. He spent his entire career at the Chunichi Dragons in Japan's Central League where he captured the Central League MVP award in 2011.
