= Kenta Asakura =

Japanese professional baseball pitcher

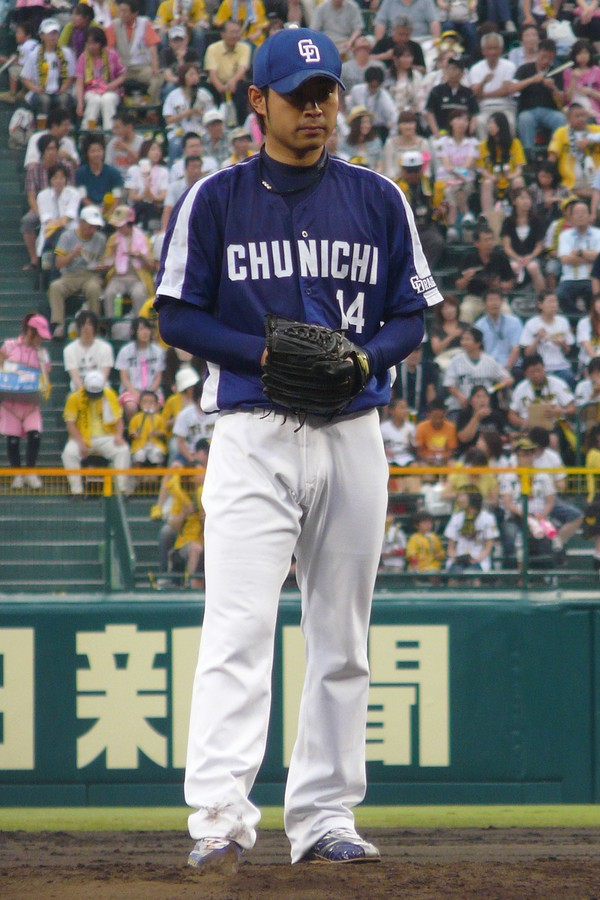
- Pitcher/Coach
- Born: June 11, 1981 (age 45); Gifu, Gifu
- Batted: Right Threw: Right

NPB debut
- October 10, 2000, for the Chunichi Dragons

Last NPB appearance
- September 20, 2015, for the Chunichi Dragons

NPB statistics (through 2015)
- Win–loss record: 65–70
- ERA: 4.11
- Strikeouts: 739
- Stats at Baseball Reference

Teams
- As player: Chunichi Dragons (2000–2015); As coach: Chunichi Dragons (2016–2018)

Career highlights and awards
- 1× NPB All-Star (2006); 1× Japan Series champion (2007)

Kenta Asakura (朝倉 健太, born June 11, 1981) is a Japanese former professional baseball pitcher. Asakura played with the Chunichi Dragons from 2000 to 2015 and was employed as a pitching coach for the Dragons first team, from 2016 to 2018.
