= Masanori Ishikawa =

Japanese baseball player (born 1980)

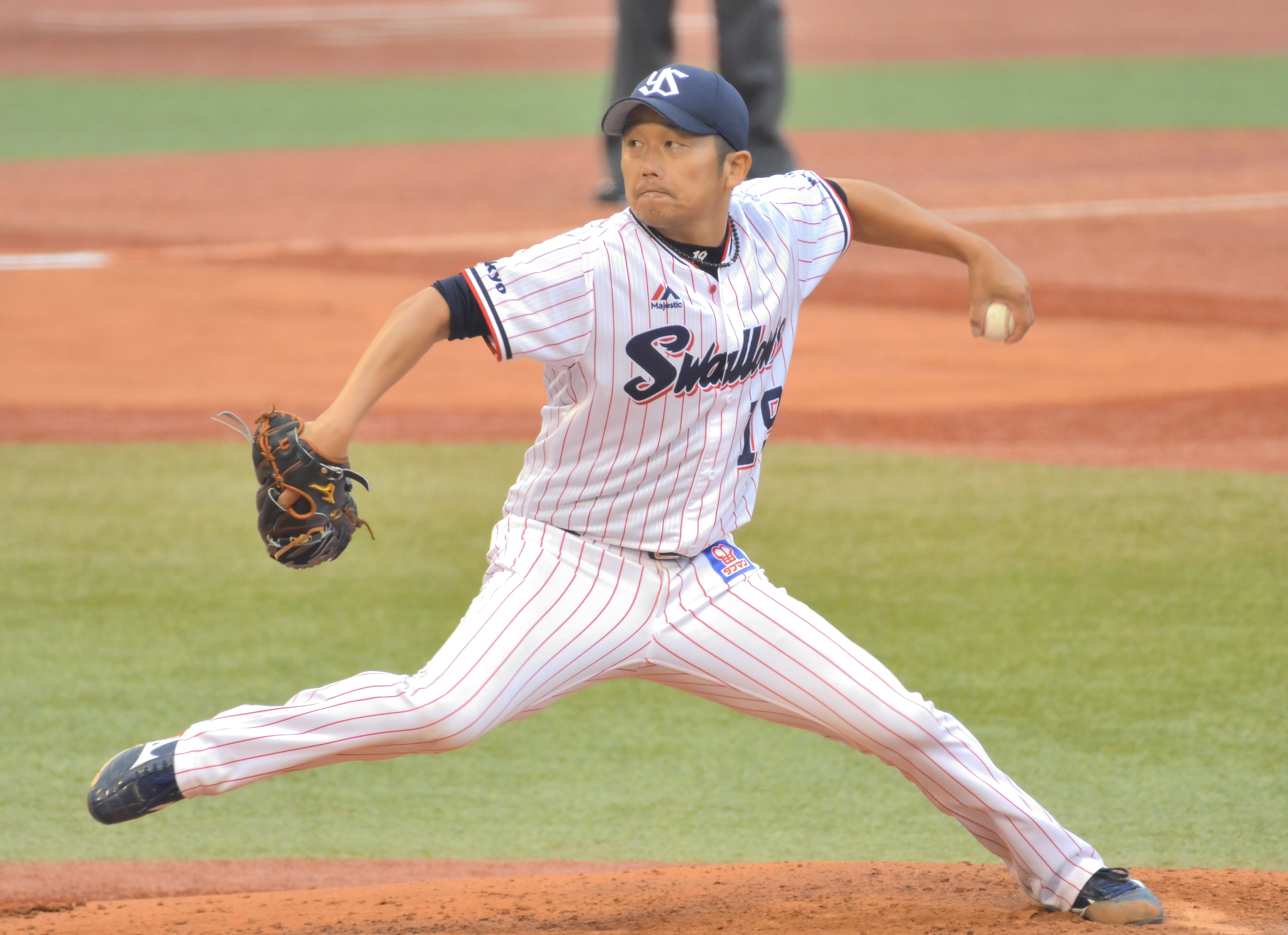
- Ishikawa with the Tokyo Yakult Swallows

Tokyo Yakult Swallows – No. 19
- Pitcher
- Born: January 22, 1980 (age 45); Akita City, Akita, Japan
- Bats: Left Throws: Left

NPB debut
- April 4, 2002, for the Yakult Swallows

NPB statistics (through April 9, 2025)
- Win–loss record: 187-189
- Earned run average: 3.88
- Strikeouts: 1,780

Teams
- Yakult Swallows/Tokyo Yakult Swallows (2002–present)

Career highlights and awards
- 2002 Central League Rookie of the Year; 2× NPB All-Star (2006, 2008); 1× NPB ERA Champion (2008); 1× Mitsui Golden Glove Award (2008); 1× Japan Series champion (2021)

Masanori Ishikawa (石川 雅規, Ishikawa Masanori; born January 22, 1980) is a Japanese professional baseball pitcher for the Tokyo Yakult Swallows of Nippon Professional Baseball (NPB). As of the 2025 season, he is the oldest active NPB player.

== Career ==
Ishikawa began his career with the Yakult Swallows in 2002, making his Nippon Professional Baseball (NPB) debut on April 4, 2002.

On April 7, 2022, Ishikawa became the 3rd pitcher in NPB history to record a hit in 21 consecutive seasons. The other pitchers to achieve the feat were Masaaki Koyama from 1953 to 1973 and Daisuke Miura (the manager of the Yokohama DeNA BayStars at the time) from 1993 to 2016.
