= Marc Kroon =

American baseball player (born 1973)

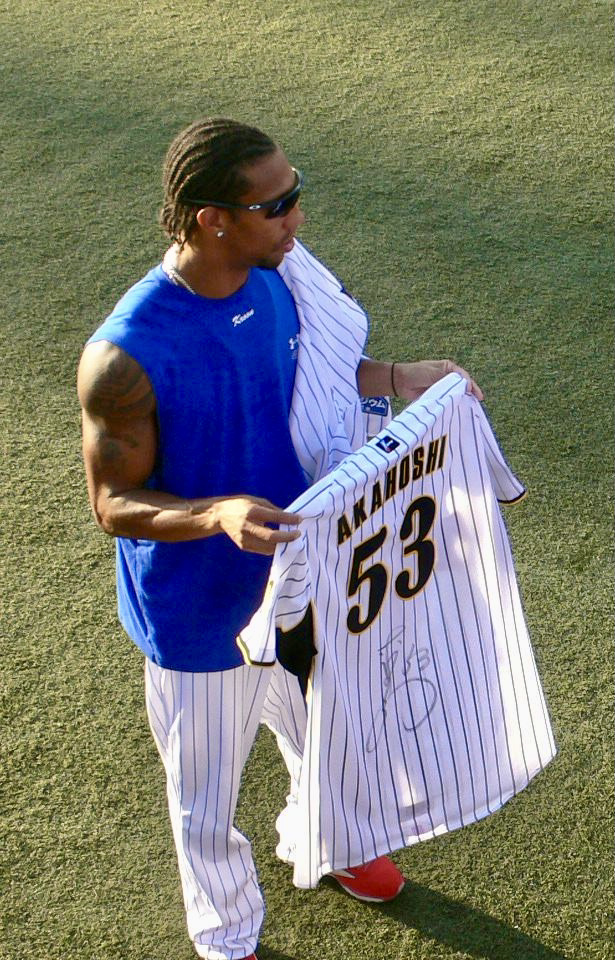
- Relief pitcher
- Born: April 2, 1973 (age 53); The Bronx, New York, U.S.
- Batted: Right Threw: Right

Professional debut
- MLB: July 7, 1995, for the San Diego Padres
- NPB: April 2, 2005, for the Yokohama BayStars

Last appearance
- MLB: June 29, 2004, for the Colorado Rockies
- NPB: October 8, 2010, for the Yomiuri Giants

MLB statistics
- Win–loss record: 0–2
- Earned run average: 7.76
- Strikeouts: 23

NPB statistics
- Win–loss record: 14–18
- Earned run average: 2.68
- Strikeouts: 417
- Saves: 177
- Stats at Baseball Reference

Teams
- San Diego Padres (1995, 1997–1998); Cincinnati Reds (1998); Colorado Rockies (2004); Yokohama BayStars (2005–2007); Yomiuri Giants (2008–2010)

Career highlights and awards
- Japan Series champion (2009)

Marc Jason Kroon (born April 2, 1973) is an American former professional baseball relief pitcher. He played in Major League Baseball (MLB) for the San Diego Padres, Cincinnati Reds, and Colorado Rockies. He also played in Nippon Professional Baseball (NPB) for the Yokohama BayStars and Yomiuri Giants, serving as Yomiuri's closer as they won the 2009 Japan Series.

== Professional career ==
=== Draft and minor leagues ===
He was drafted 72nd overall by the New York Mets in 1991. The Mets traded him to the San Diego Padres in 1993 as the player to be named later in an earlier trade for Frank Seminara.

=== San Diego Padres (1995, 1997–1998) ===
On July 7, 1995, Kroon made his Major League debut with the San Diego Padres.

=== Cincinnati Reds (1998) ===
The Padres traded Kroon to the Cincinnati Reds for Buddy Carlyle in April 1998.

Kroon retired following elbow surgeries and did not play baseball at any level in 2001 or 2002. He came out of retirement and joined the Anaheim Angels organization in 2003 after coach Mike Butcher's brother-in-law saw him giving a pitching lesson in a park.

=== Yokohama BayStars (2005–2007) ===
Kroon joined the Yokohama BayStars in 2005. After the 2007 season, Kroon and the BayStars failed to come to terms on a new contract, and ended up being a free agent. Kroon was later signed by the Yomiuri Giants along with two other major non-Japanese free agents: former Tokyo Yakult Swallows standouts Seth Greisinger, and Alex Ramirez.

=== Yomiuri Giants (2008–2010) ===
In 2008, Kroon led the Central League in saves with 41. He also broke his own record of pitching to 162 km/h (101 mph).

=== San Francisco Giants ===
Kroon signed a minor league contract with an invitation for spring training with the San Francisco Giants in 2011. Kroon was reassigned to triple-A Fresno Grizzlies at the end of spring training.

Kroon was featured in the Showtime television production The Franchise.

On March 8, 2012, Kroon retired.

== Personal life ==
His son, Matt Kroon, played as an infielder in the Philadelphia Phillies organization from 2018 to 2025.
