= 2017 Japan Series =

68th edition of Nippon Professional Baseball's championship series

Team (Wins)	Managers	Season
Fukuoka SoftBank Hawks (4)	Kimiyasu Kudo	94–49–0 (.657), 13.5 GA
Yokohama DeNA BayStars (2)	Alex Ramírez	73–65–5 (.529), 14.5 GB
- Dates: October 28 – November 4
- MVP: Dennis Sarfate (Fukuoka)
- FSA: Toshiro Miyazaki (Yokohama)

Broadcast
- Television: TBS (Games 1, 3-5); Fuji TV (Game 2); TV Asahi (Game 6)

The 2017 Japan Series (known as the SMBC Nippon Series 2017 for sponsorship reasons) was the championship series of Nippon Professional Baseball's postseason. The 68th edition of the Japan Series, it was a best-of-seven playoff between the Fukuoka SoftBank Hawks of the Pacific League and the Yokohama DeNA BayStars of the Central League.

SoftBank finished in first place in the Pacific League during the 2017 regular season, while the BayStars advanced to the postseason after finishing in third place in the Central League. In the 2017 Climax Series, the Hawks defeated the Tohoku Rakuten Golden Eagles to win the Pacific League Championship. The BayStars defeated the Hiroshima Toyo Carp to become the Central League champions, becoming the first Central League team to finish in third place during the regular season to win a Climax Series.

The Hawks won the first three games of the series. Facing elimination, the BayStars won Games 4 and 5. Returning home, the Hawks won Game 6 to win the series, 4–2. Hawks' pitcher Dennis Sarfate, with two saves and a Game 6 win, was named the Japan Series Most Valuable Player (MVP). Toshiro Miyazaki won the Fighting Spirit Award, given to the best player on the losing team. This is the first Japan Series loss for the BayStars, having won in two previous appearances in 1960 and 1998.

== Climax Series ==
First Stage
Central League
2	Hanshin Tigers	1
3	Yokohama DeNA BayStars	2
Pacific League
2	Saitama Seibu Lions	1
3	Tohoku Rakuten Golden Eagles	2

Final Stage
1	Hiroshima Toyo Carp	2
3	Yokohama DeNA BayStars	4
1	Fukuoka SoftBank Hawks	4
3	Tohoku Rakuten Golden Eagles	2

Japan Series
CL3	Yokohama DeNA BayStars	2
PL1	Fukuoka SoftBank Hawks	4

== Series notes ==
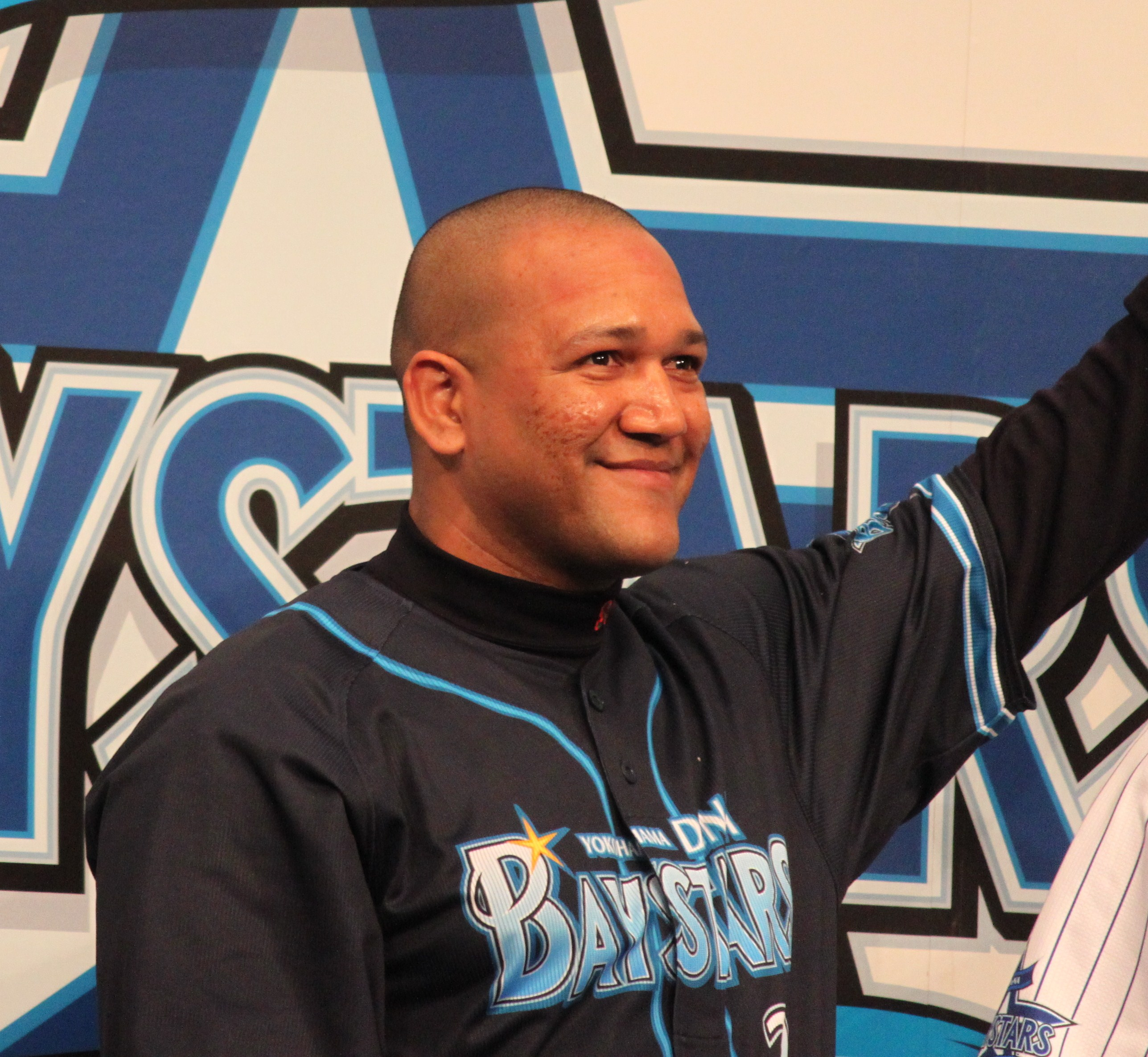
Alex Ramírez, the manager of the Yokohama DeNA BayStars

The Yokohama DeNA BayStars last won the Japan Series in 1998. They had losing records in every season from 2002 through 2016, with ten last place finishes in that span. In 2012, DeNA purchased the BayStars from the Tokyo Broadcasting System. DeNA focused on increasing attendance at Yokohama Stadium and improving the team, hiring Alex Ramírez as their manager in 2016. The BayStars finished in third place in the Central League in 2017, 13 1/2 games behind the Hiroshima Toyo Carp. Their .252 team batting average and 134 home runs were both second best in the Central League. The BayStars defeated the Hanshin Tigers and then the Carp in the 2017 Central League Climax Series, becoming the first third place team to advance to the Japan Series from the Central League. José López was the most valuable player (MVP) of the Central League Climax Series.

The Fukuoka SoftBank Hawks have won three Japan Series championships since 2011. Their 3.22 earned run average was the lowest in Nippon Professional Baseball (NPB) in 2017, and Dennis Sarfate set an NPB single-season record with 54 saves. Alfredo Despaigne and Yuki Yanagita both hit over 30 home runs, as the Hawks hit 164 home runs, the most in NPB during the regular season. They defeated the Tohoku Rakuten Golden Eagles in the 2017 Pacific League Climax Series. Seiichi Uchikawa was named the MVP of the Pacific League Climax Series. Uchikawa, the captain of the Hawks, played for Yokohama for ten seasons.

== Series overview ==
Fukuoka SoftBank Hawks won the series, 4–2.

Game	Date	Score	Location	Time	Attendance
1	October 28	Yokohama DeNA BayStars – 1, Fukuoka SoftBank Hawks – 10	Fukuoka Dome	3:13	36,183
2	October 29	Yokohama DeNA BayStars – 3, Fukuoka SoftBank Hawks – 4	Fukuoka Dome	3:56	36,082
3	October 31	Fukuoka SoftBank Hawks – 3, Yokohama DeNA BayStars – 2	Yokohama Stadium	3:53	27,153
4	November 1	Fukuoka SoftBank Hawks – 0, Yokohama DeNA BayStars – 6	Yokohama Stadium	3:02	27,162
5	November 2	Fukuoka SoftBank Hawks – 4, Yokohama DeNA BayStars – 5	Yokohama Stadium	3:35	27,180
6	November 4	Yokohama DeNA BayStars – 3, Fukuoka SoftBank Hawks – 4 (11)	Fukuoka Dome	4:22	36,118

== Game summaries ==
=== Game 1 ===
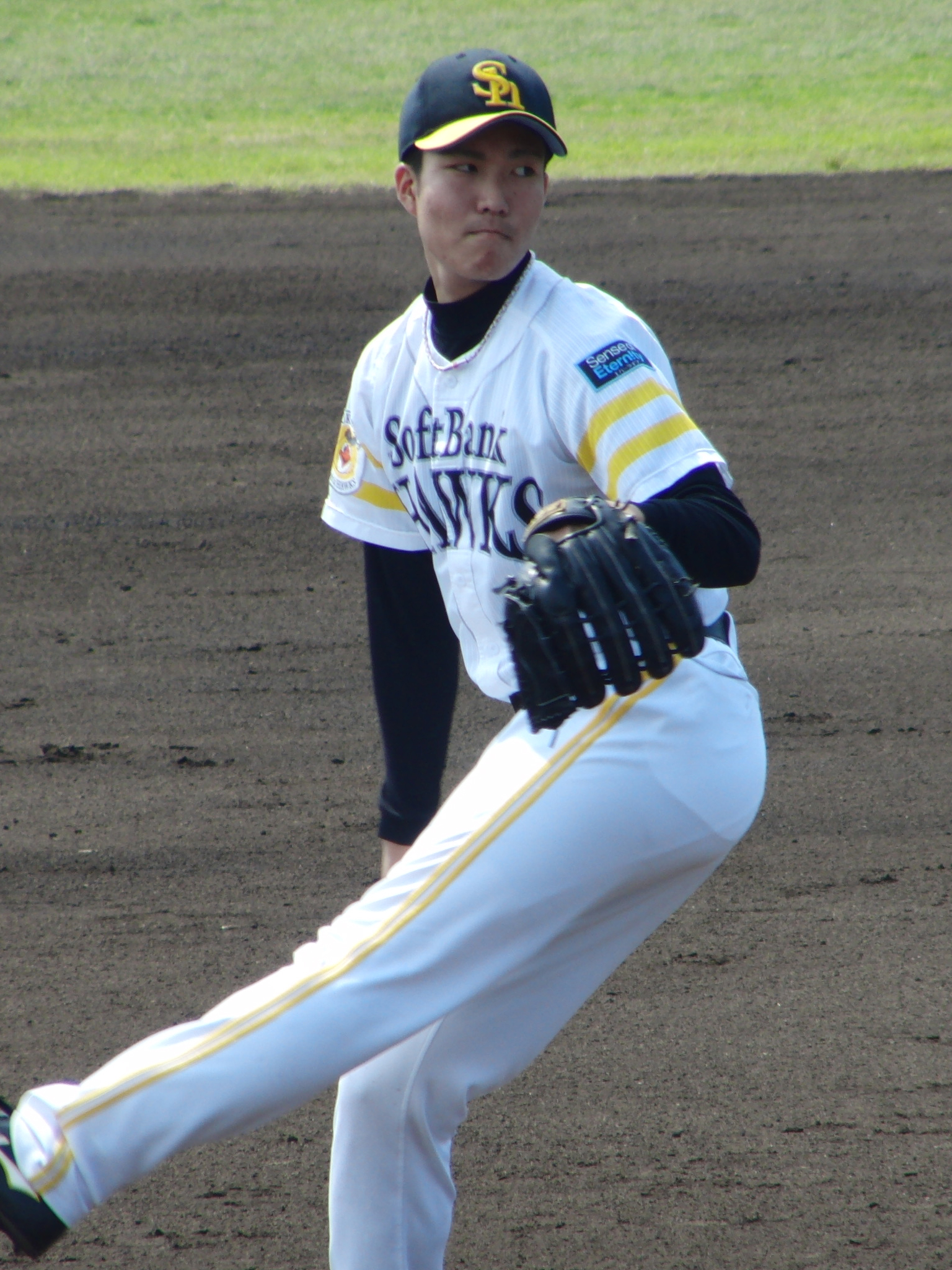
Kodai Senga earned the win in Game 1.

Saturday, October 28, 2017, 6:32 pm (JST) at Fukuoka Yahuoku! Dome in Fukuoka, Fukuoka Prefecture
Team	1	2	3	4	5	6	7	8	9	R	H	E
DeNA	0	0	0	0	1	0	0	0	0	1	6	1
SoftBank	1	2	0	0	7	0	0	0	X	10	9	1
WP: Kodai Senga (1–0) LP: Shoichi Ino (0–1); Home runs: YDB: Yuya Hasegawa (1); SBH: None; Attendance: 36,183; Boxscore

Kodai Senga started for the Hawks, and Shoichi Ino started for the BayStars. The Hawks scored in the first inning when Despaigne hit a run batted in (RBI) double, scoring Yanagita. In the second inning, Yuya Hasegawa hit a two-run home run. The BayStars scored a run on an RBI ground ball by Masayuki Kuwahara in the top of the fifth inning, but the Hawks scored seven runs in the bottom of the fifth inning, when Kenta Imamiya scored on an RBI single by Despaigne, Keizo Kawashima and Takuya Kai drew walks with the bases loaded, Yanagita had a two RBI single, and Imamiya had a two RBI triple. Senga allowed one unearned run on four hits in seven innings pitched to earn the victory.

=== Game 2 ===
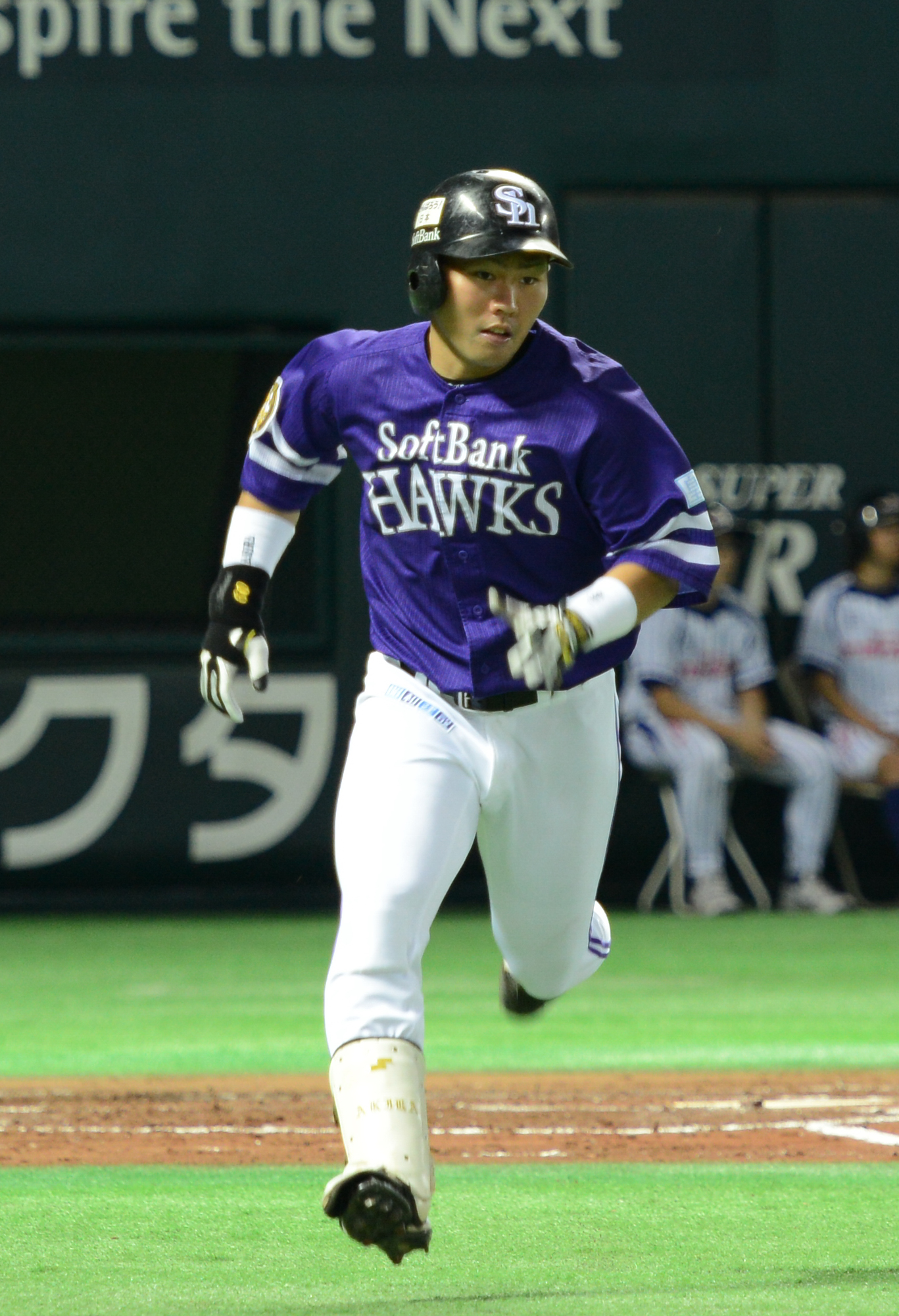
Akira Nakamura drove in the game-winning run for SoftBank in Game 2.

Sunday, October 29, 2017, 6:32 pm (JST) at Fukuoka Yahuoku! Dome in Fukuoka, Fukuoka Prefecture
Team	1	2	3	4	5	6	7	8	9	R	H	E
DeNA	0	0	0	0	0	3	0	0	0	3	5	1
SoftBank	1	0	0	0	0	0	3	0	X	4	8	0
WP: Shuta Ishikawa (1–0) LP: Spencer Patton (0–1) Sv: Dennis Sarfate (1); Home runs: YDB: Takayuki Kajitani (1), Toshiro Miyazaki (1); SBH: None; Attendance: 36,082; Boxscore

Nao Higashihama started for the Hawks, pitching 5 1/3 innings, and allowing one run on four hits with six strikeouts. Shōta Imanaga started for the BayStars, allowing one run and five hits with 10 strikeouts in six innings. The BayStars scored all three of their runs in the sixth inning, with a solo home run by Takayuki Kajitani and a two-run home run by Toshiro Miyazaki. The Hawks scored three runs in the bottom of the seventh, including a two-RBI single by Akira Nakamura that resulted in a close play at home plate. Instant replay determined that Imamiya was safe, giving Softbank a one-run lead. Sarfate earned the save.

=== Game 3 ===
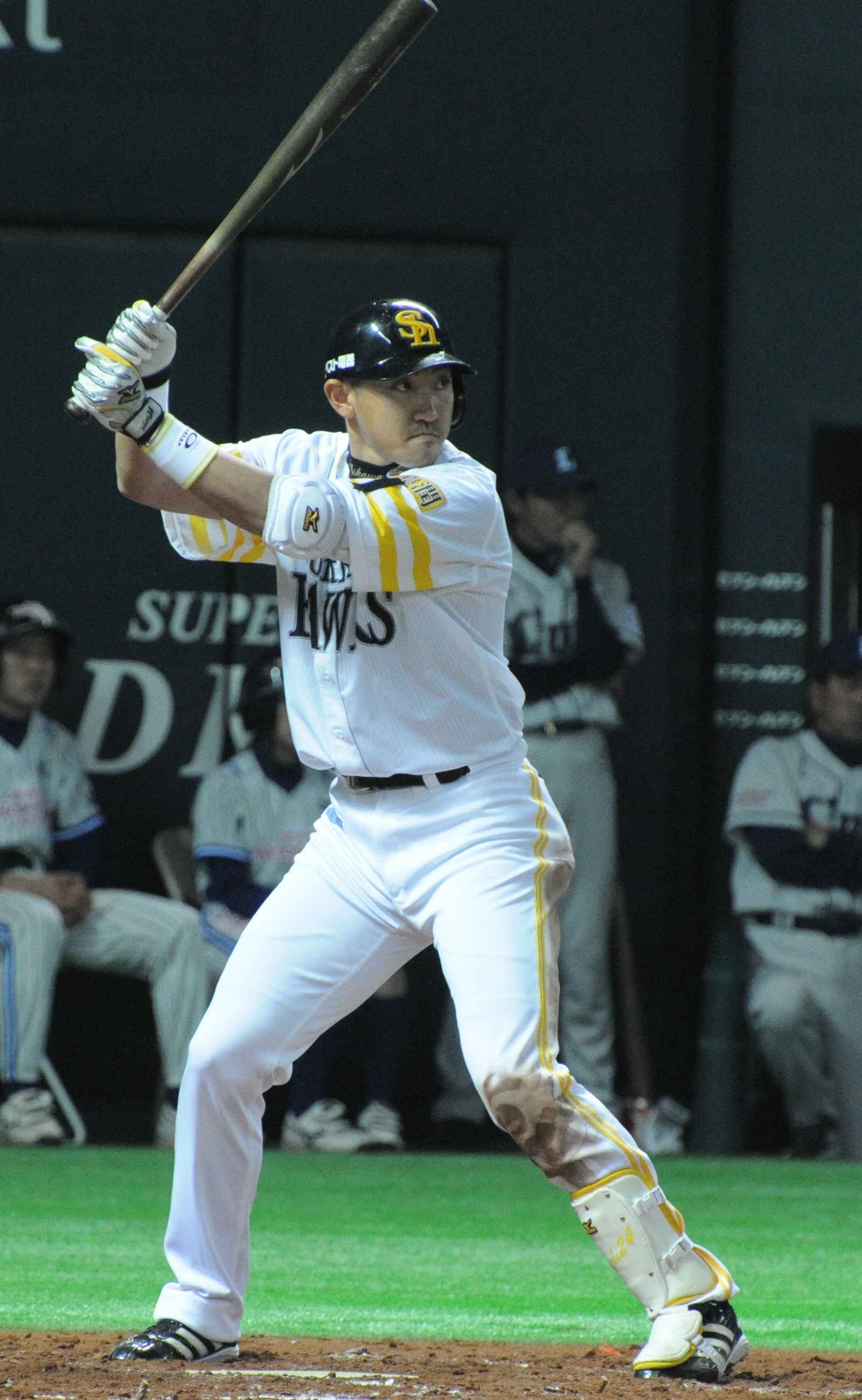
Seiichi Uchikawa drove in a run for SoftBank in the first inning of Game 3.

Tuesday, October 31, 2017, 6:33 pm (JST) at Yokohama Stadium in Yokohama, Kanagawa Prefecture
Team	1	2	3	4	5	6	7	8	9	R	H	E
SoftBank	1	0	0	2	0	0	0	0	0	3	7	0
DeNA	0	0	0	1	0	1	0	0	0	2	7	0
WP: Shuta Ishikawa (2–0) LP: Joe Wieland (0–1) Sv: Dennis Sarfate (2); Home runs: SBH: None; YDB: José López (1); Attendance: 27,153; Boxscore

Kazuhiro Sasaki, a member of the BayStars in their 1998 championship season, threw the ceremonial first pitch. Joe Wieland started Game 3 for the BayStars, and Shota Takeda started for the Hawks. Uchikawa had an RBI single for SoftBank in the first inning. Hiroaki Takaya hit a two RBI single in the fourth inning to extend the lead to 3–0. Takeda was removed from the game after 4 1/3 innings. He allowing one run, a home run by López in the fourth inning, but was able to escape a bases loaded jam that inning without allowing more runs. The Hawks' relief pitchers completed the victory by pitching 4 2/3 innings, allowing one run on an infield single in the sixth inning. Shuta Ishikawa, the first reliever to enter the game, earned the win. Wieland, who allowed three runs in 5 1/3 innings, took the loss. Sarfate earned his second save of the series.

=== Game 4 ===
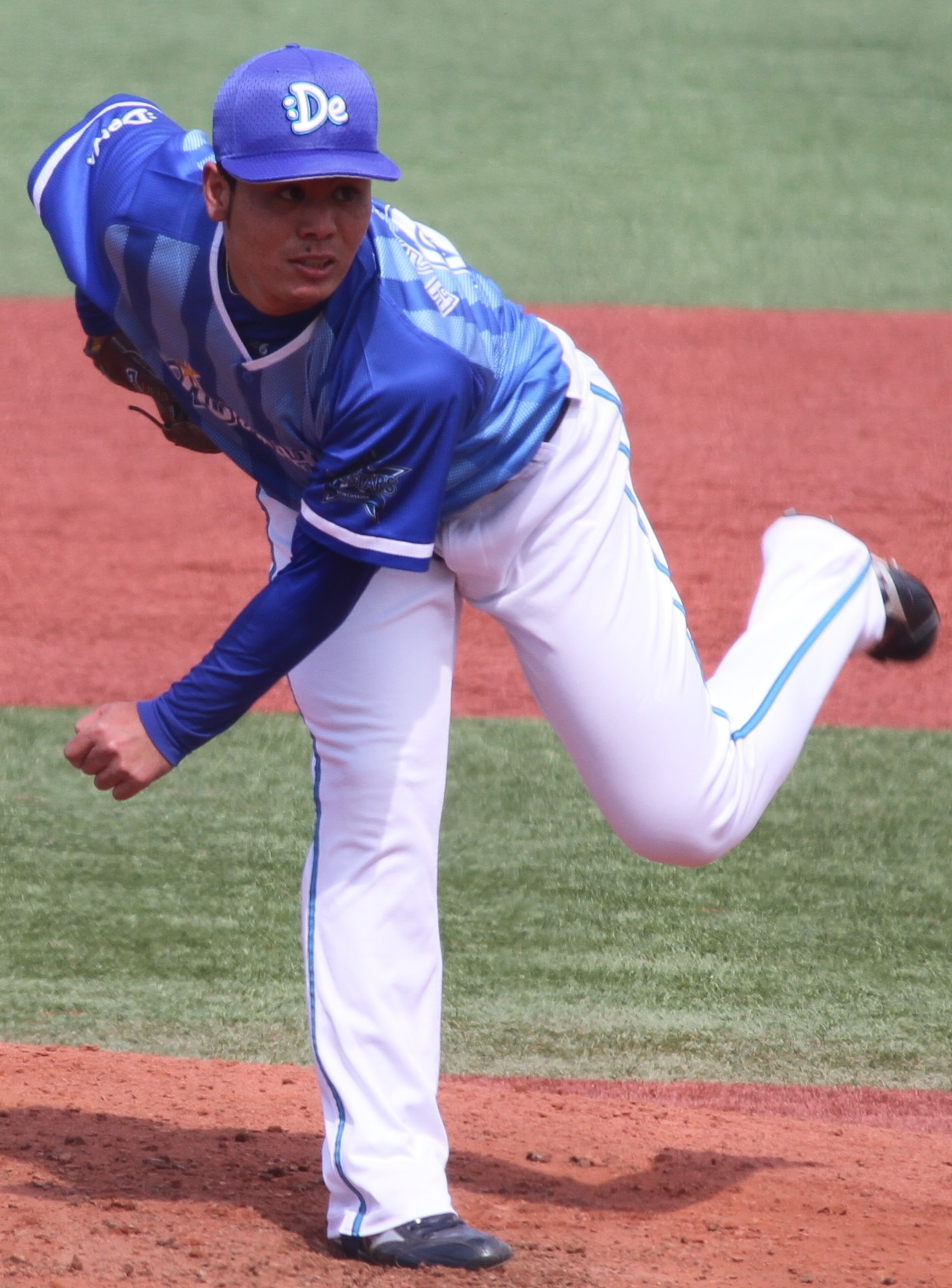
Rookie Haruhiro Hamaguchi pitched 7 1/3 no-hit innings for DeNA in Game 4.

Wednesday, November 1, 2017, 6:31 pm (JST) at Yokohama Stadium in Yokohama, Kanagawa Prefecture
Team	1	2	3	4	5	6	7	8	9	R	H	E
SoftBank	0	0	0	0	0	0	0	0	0	0	2	0
DeNA	0	0	0	0	2	0	1	3	X	6	12	1
WP: Haruhiro Hamaguchi (1–0) LP: Tsuyoshi Wada (0–1); Home runs: SBH: None; YDB: Toshiro Miyazaki (2), Shuto Takajo (1); Boxscore

With DeNA facing elimination, they started rookie Haruhiro Hamaguchi in Game 4. Hamaguchi did not allow a hit to SoftBank for 7 1/3 innings, when Shinya Tsuruoka hit a double. He came out of the game after allowing his second hit in the inning. Tsuyoshi Wada, starting for the Hawks, allowed two runs in five innings. Miyazaki hit a solo home run in the fifth inning, followed by a run-scoring sacrifice fly by Toshihiko Kuramoto. In the seventh inning, Shuto Takajo hit a home run for the BayStars to extend their lead to 3–0. In the eighth inning, DeNA expanded their lead when Miyazaki hit an RBI single and Takajo hit a two-run single.

=== Game 5 ===
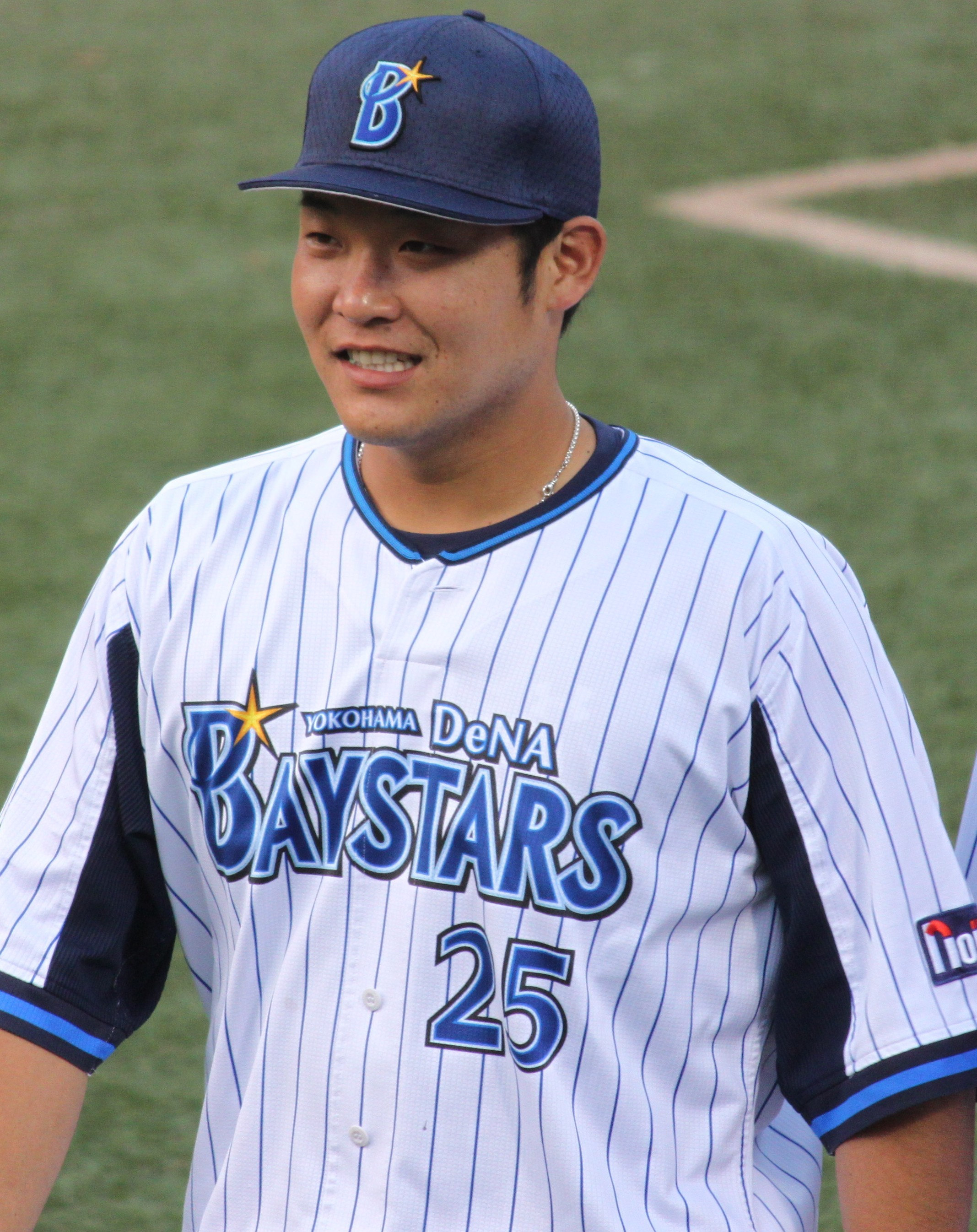
Yoshitomo Tsutsugo had three RBIs for DeNA in Game 5.

Thursday, November 2, 2017, 6:32 pm (JST) at Yokohama Stadium in Yokohama, Kanagawa Prefecture
Team	1	2	3	4	5	6	7	8	9	R	H	E
SoftBank	1	0	0	0	3	0	0	0	0	4	11	1
DeNA	0	0	0	2	0	3	0	0	X	5	6	1
WP: Yoshiki Sunada (1–0) LP: Liván Moinelo (0–1) Sv: Yasuaki Yamasaki (1); Home runs: SBH: Akira Nakamura (1); YDB: Yoshitomo Tsutsugo (1); Boxscore

Rick van den Hurk started Game 5 for SoftBank, and Kenta Ishida started for DeNA. SoftBank scored in the first inning of Game 5, with a single and stolen base by Imamiya followed by an RBI double by Uchikawa. In the fourth inning, López hit a double for DeNA, and Yoshitomo Tsutsugo hit a two-run home run. SoftBank took a 4–2 lead in the fifth inning with a sacrifice fly by Despaigne and a two-run home run by Nakamura. DeNA responded in the sixth inning with an RBI double by Tsutsugo and an RBI single by Miyazaki that tied the game, 4–4. Another run scored on an error by Hawks' second baseman Kenji Akashi. Yasuaki Yamasaki, DeNA's closer, entered the game with two baserunners in the eighth inning, but escaped without allowing a run. The Hawks loaded the bases against Yamasaki in the ninth inning, but he completed the save without allowing a run.

=== Game 6 ===
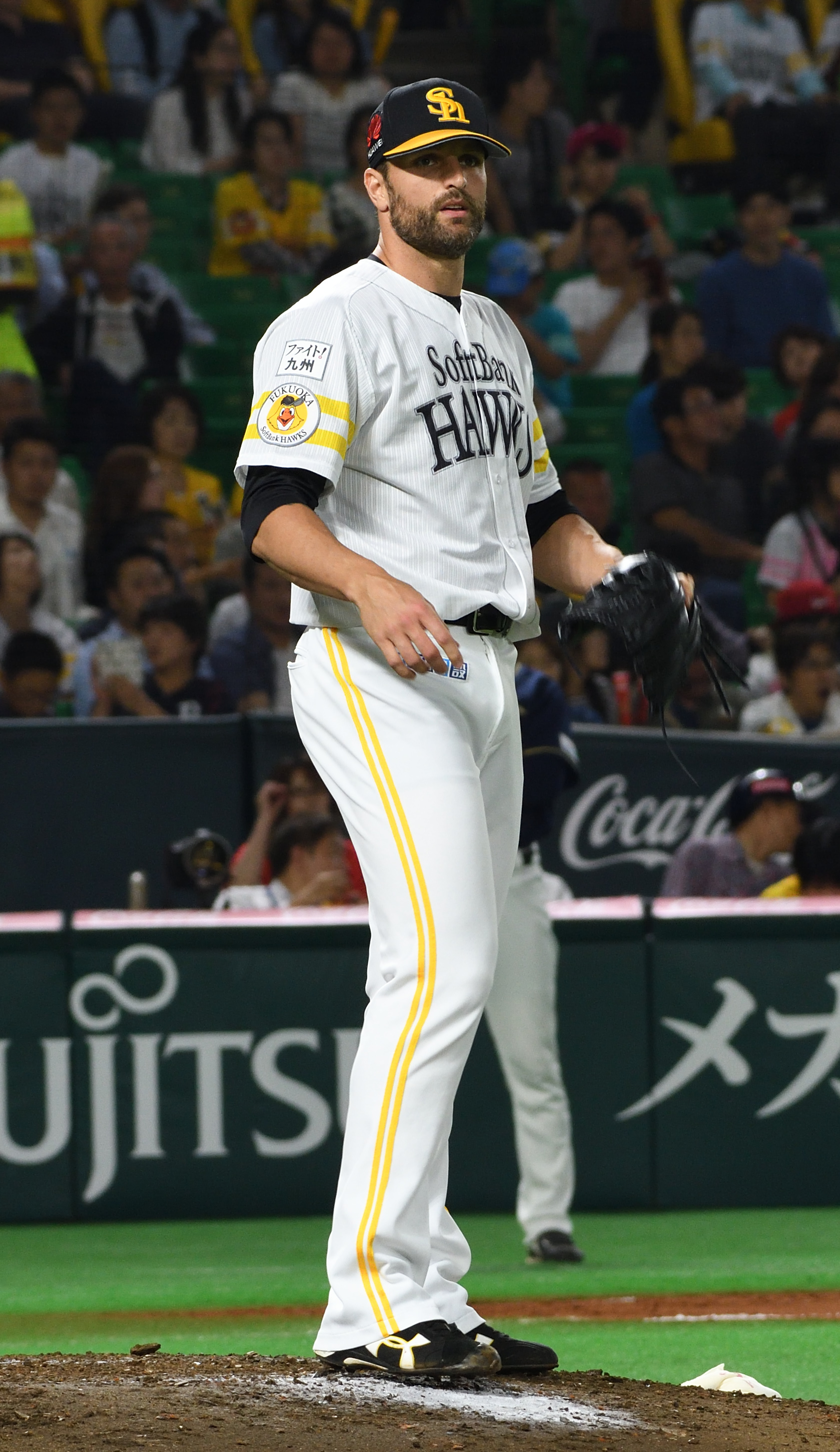
In the series, Dennis Sarfate earned two saves and the win in the deciding Game 6.

Saturday, November 4, 2017, 6:34 pm (JST) at Fukuoka Yahuoku! Dome in Fukuoka, Fukuoka Prefecture
Team	1	2	3	4	5	6	7	8	9	10	11	R	H	E
DeNA	0	0	0	0	3	0	0	0	0	0	0	3	11	0
SoftBank	0	1	0	0	0	0	0	1	1	0	1	4	5	1
WP: Dennis Sarfate (1–0) LP: Edwin Escobar (0–1); Home runs: YDB: Hiroyuki Shirasaki (1); SBH: Nobuhiro Matsuda (1), Seiichi Uchikawa (1); Boxscore

With the series returning to the Fukuoka Yahuoku! Dome, Higashihama started for the Hawks and Imanaga started for DeNA. Nobuhiro Matsuda hit a home run for SoftBank in the second inning, and Hiroyuki Shirasaki hit a home run for DeNA in the fifth inning, tying the score. López hit a two-run single in the fifth inning, giving DeNA a 3–1 lead. Higashihama allowed three runs on five hits in 4 1/3 innings, while Imanaga pitched seven innings with 11 strikeouts, allowing two runs.

Trailing 3–2 in the ninth inning, Uchikawa hit a game-tying solo home run off of Yamasaki. Keizo Kawashima hit the walk-off RBI single for SoftBank in the eleventh inning for the title. Sarfate pitched three scoreless innings of relief for SoftBank to earn the win. Sarfate won the Japan Series Most Valuable Player Award.

== See also ==
- 2017 Korean Series
- 2017 World Series
