= 2017 Central League Climax Series =

First stage
Team (Wins)		Manager	Season
Yokohama DeNA BayStars (2)		Alex Ramírez	73–65–5 (.529), 14.5 GB
Hanshin Tigers (1)		Tomoaki Kanemoto	78–61–4 (.561), 10 GB
- Dates: October 14–17

Final stage
Team (Wins)		Manager	Season
Yokohama DeNA BayStars (4)		Alex Ramírez	73–65–5 (.529), 14.5 GB
Hiroshima Toyo Carp (2)		Koichi Ogata	88–51–4 (.633), 10 GA
- Dates: October 18–24
- MVP: José López (DeNA)

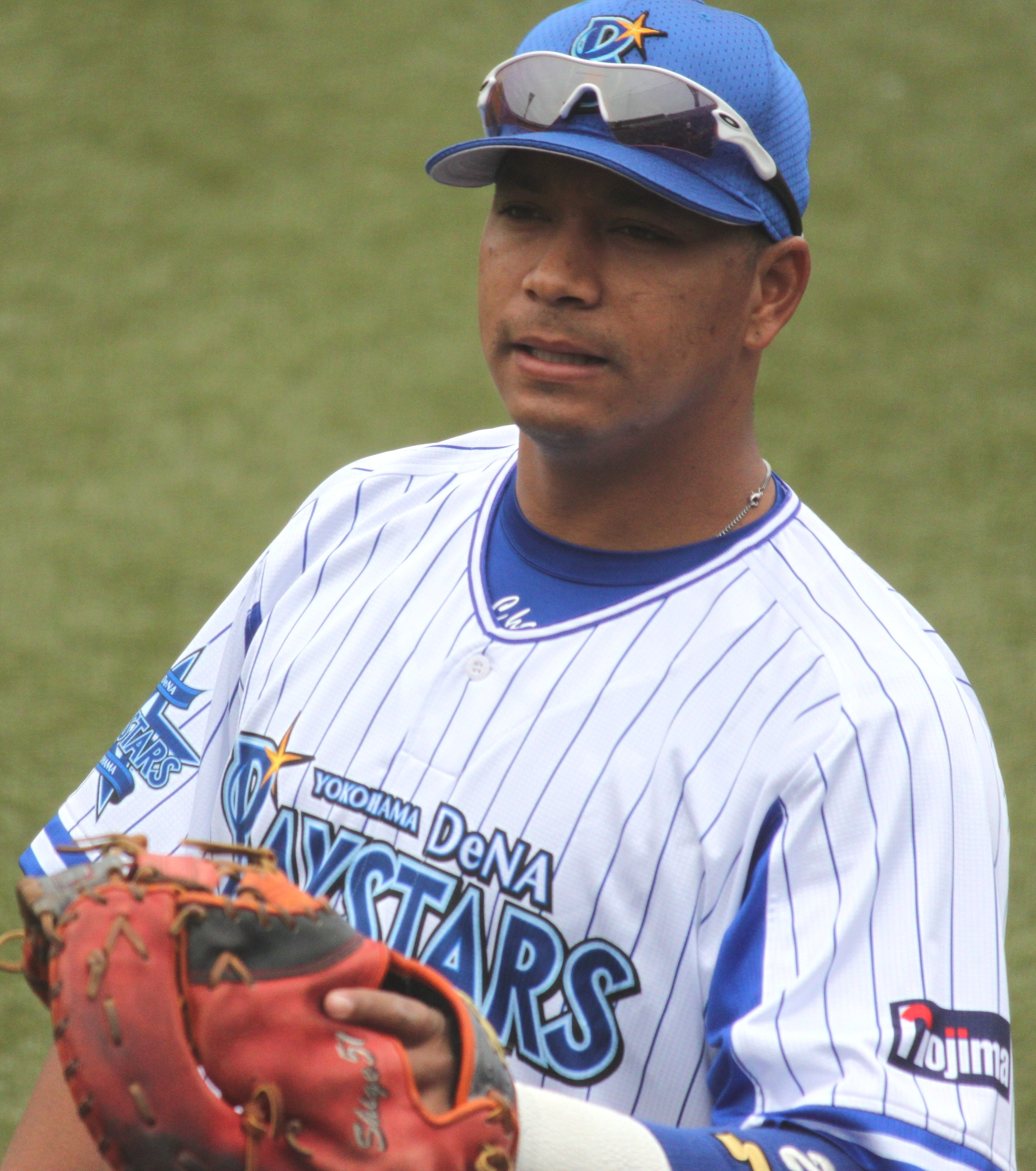
José López, infielder of the Yokohama DeNA BayStars, at Yokohama Stadium

The 2017 Central League Climax Series (CLCS) was a post-season playoff consisting of two consecutive series that determined who would represent the Central League in the Japan Series. The First Stage was a best-of-three series and the Final Stage was a best-of-six with the top seed being awarded a one-win advantage. The winner of the series advanced to the 2017 Japan Series, where they competed against the 2017 Pacific League Climax Series winner. The top three regular-season finishers played in the two series. The CLCS began with the first game of the First Stage on October 14 and ended with the final game of the Final Stage on October 24.

== First stage ==
=== Summary ===
Yokohama DeNA BayStars won the series, 2–1.

Game	Date	Score	Location	Time	Attendance
1	October 14	Yokohama DeNA BayStars – 0, Hanshin Tigers – 2	Koshien Stadium	2:52	46,748
2	October 15	Yokohama DeNA BayStars – 13, Hanshin Tigers – 6	Koshien Stadium	4:35	46,761
3	October 17^{†}	Yokohama DeNA BayStars – 6, Hanshin Tigers – 1	Koshien Stadium	3:10	46,319

† This game was originally scheduled for Monday, October 16, but postponed one day due to weather.

=== Game 1 ===
Saturday, October 14, 2017, 2:02 pm (JST) at Koshien Stadium in Nishinomiya, Hyōgo Prefecture
Team	1	2	3	4	5	6	7	8	9	R	H	E
DeNA	0	0	0	0	0	0	0	0	0	0	4	1
Hanshin	0	0	0	0	0	2	0	0	X	2	8	0
WP: Randy Messenger (1–0) LP: Shoichi Ino (0–1) Sv: Rafael Dolis (1); Home runs: DEN: None; HAN: Kosuke Fukudome (1); Attendance: 46,748

=== Game 2 ===
Sunday, October 15, 2017, 3:03 pm (JST) at Koshien Stadium in Nishinomiya, Hyōgo Prefecture
Team	1	2	3	4	5	6	7	8	9	R	H	E
DeNA	0	0	2	0	2	0	6	0	3	13	21	1
Hanshin	0	2	1	0	0	1	2	0	0	6	10	1
WP: Tomoya Mikami (1–0) LP: Kentaro Kuwahara (0–1); Home runs: DEN: Tomo Otosaka (1); HAN: Yusuke Oyama (1); Attendance: 46,761

=== Game 3 ===
Tuesday, October 17, 2017, 6:00 pm (JST) at Koshien Stadium in Nishinomiya, Hyōgo Prefecture
Team	1	2	3	4	5	6	7	8	9	R	H	E
DeNA	3	0	0	3	0	0	0	0	0	6	10	0
Hanshin	0	0	0	0	0	1	0	0	0	1	8	0
WP: Joe Wieland (1–0) LP: Atsushi Nomi (0–1); Home runs: DEN: José López (1); HAN: None; Attendance: 46,319

== Final stage ==
=== Summary ===
Yokohama DeNA BayStars won the series, 4–2*.

Game	Date	Score	Location	Time	Attendance
1	October 18	Yokohama DeNA BayStars – 0, Hiroshima Toyo Carp – 3 (5)	Mazda Stadium	1:37	30,810
2	October 19	Yokohama DeNA BayStars – 6, Hiroshima Toyo Carp – 2	Mazda Stadium	3:40	31,165
3	October 20	Yokohama DeNA BayStars – 1, Hiroshima Toyo Carp – 0	Mazda Stadium	3:23	31,279
4	October 23^{†}	Yokohama DeNA BayStars – 4, Hiroshima Toyo Carp – 3	Mazda Stadium	3:26	31,311
5	October 24^{†}	Yokohama DeNA BayStars – 9, Hiroshima Toyo Carp – 3	Mazda Stadium	3:39	31,230

* The Central League regular season champion is given a one-game advantage in the Final Stage.
† Game 4 was originally scheduled for Saturday, October 21, but was postponed for two days due to weather, forcing Game 5 to be subsequently postponed two days as well.

=== Game 1 ===
Wednesday, October 18, 2017, 6:00 pm (JST) at Mazda Zoom-Zoom Stadium Hiroshima in Hiroshima, Hiroshima Prefecture
Team	1	2	3	4	5	R	H	E
DeNA	0	0	0	0	0	0	2	1
Hiroshima	0	0	0	0	3	3	3	0
WP: Kazuki Yabuta (1–0) LP: Kenta Ishida (0–1); Attendance: 30,810; Notes: Game 1 was shortened to five innings because of weather. NPB does not require weather-shortened games to reach nine innings, unlike a North American rule requiring postseason games to do so. See 2008 World Series for the reason MLB has such a rule.

=== Game 2 ===
Thursday, October 19, 2017, 6:01 pm (JST) at Mazda Zoom-Zoom Stadium Hiroshima in Hiroshima, Hiroshima Prefecture
Team	1	2	3	4	5	6	7	8	9	R	H	E
DeNA	0	0	2	0	2	1	0	0	1	6	11	0
Hiroshima	0	0	0	1	0	1	0	0	0	2	7	1
WP: Haruhiro Hamaguchi (1–0) LP: Yusuke Nomura (0–1); Home runs: DEN: Toshiro Miyazaki (1); HIR: None; Attendance: 31,165

=== Game 3 ===
Friday, October 20, 2017, 6:00 pm (JST) at Mazda Zoom-Zoom Stadium Hiroshima in Hiroshima, Hiroshima Prefecture
Team	1	2	3	4	5	6	7	8	9	R	H	E
DeNA	0	1	0	0	0	0	0	0	0	1	8	0
Hiroshima	0	0	0	0	0	0	0	0	0	0	6	0
WP: Shoichi Ino (1–0) LP: Kris Johnson (0–1) Sv: Yasuaki Yamasaki (1); Attendance: 31,279

=== Game 4 ===
Monday, October 23, 2017, 6:00 pm (JST) at Mazda Zoom-Zoom Stadium Hiroshima in Hiroshima, Hiroshima Prefecture
Team	1	2	3	4	5	6	7	8	9	R	H	E
DeNA	0	0	0	1	3	0	0	0	0	4	8	0
Hiroshima	3	0	0	0	0	0	0	0	0	3	5	0
WP: Joe Wieland (1–0) LP: Kazuki Yabuta (1–1) Sv: Yasuaki Yamasaki (2); Home runs: DEN: Yoshitomo Tsutsugo (1); HIR: Yoshihiro Maru (1); Attendance: 31,311

=== Game 5 ===
Tuesday, October 24, 2017, 6:00 pm (JST) at Mazda Zoom-Zoom Stadium Hiroshima in Hiroshima, Hiroshima Prefecture
Team	1	2	3	4	5	6	7	8	9	R	H	E
DeNA	0	1	2	1	2	0	1	2	0	9	16	0
Hiroshima	2	0	0	0	0	1	0	0	0	3	9	1
WP: Kazuki Mishima (1–0) LP: Yusuke Nomura (0–2); Home runs: DEN: Toshiro Miyazaki (2), Masayuki Kuwahara (1), Yoshitomo Tsutsugo 2 (3), Takayuki Kajitani (1); HIR: Takahiro Arai (1); Attendance: 31,230
