= Seiichi Uchikawa =

Japanese baseball player (born 1982)

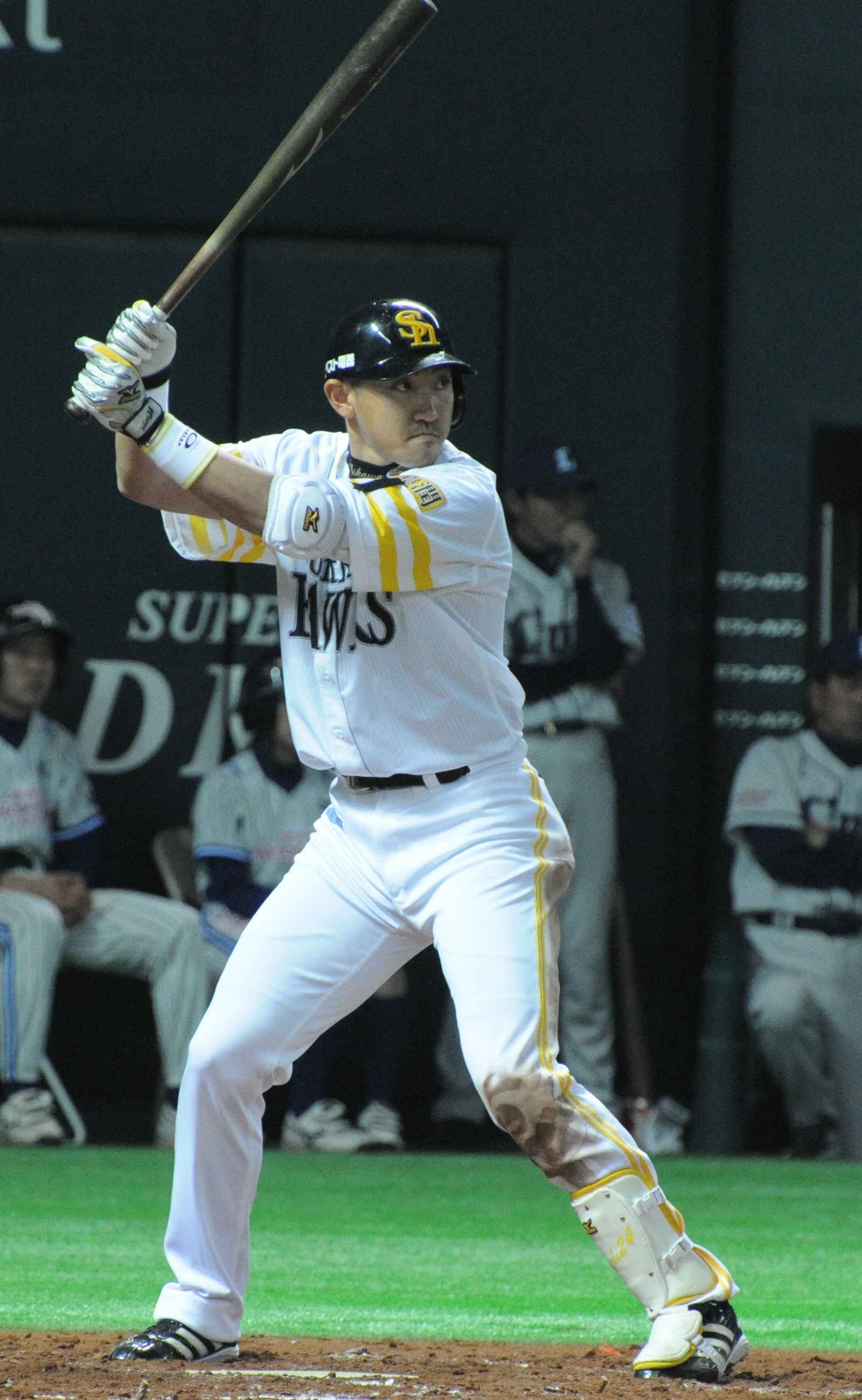
- Uchikawa with the Fukuoka SoftBank Hawks
- First baseman, Outfielder
- Born: August 4, 1982 (age 43); Ōita, Japan
- Batted: Right Threw: Right

NPB debut
- March 30, 2001, for the Yokohama BayStars

Last NPB appearance
- October 3, 2022, for the Tokyo Yakult Swallows

NPB statistics
- Batting average: .302
- Home runs: 196
- Hits: 2,186
- RBI: 960
- Stats at Baseball Reference

Teams
- Yokohama BayStars (2001–2010); Fukuoka SoftBank Hawks (2011–2020); Tokyo Yakult Swallows (2021–2022); Oita B-rings (2023)

Career highlights and awards
- 6× NPB All-Star (2008, 2009, 2011–2013, 2017); 8× Japan Series champion (2011, 2014, 2015, 2017–2021); 3× Climax Series MVP (2011, 2015, 2017); 5× Best Nine Award (2008–2009, 2011–2013); 2× NPB All-Star Game MVP (2013, 2017); Pacific League MVP (2011); Japan Series MVP (2014); Interleague play (NPB) MVP (2011); Central League Batting champion (2008); Pacific League Batting champion (2011); Central League OBP champion (2008); Central League Hits champion (2008); Pacific League Hits champion (2012)
Medals
Men's baseball
Representing Japan
World Baseball Classic
Gold medal – first place	2009 Los Angeles	Team

Seiichi Uchikawa (内川 聖一, Uchikawa Seiichi; born August 4, 1982) is a Japanese former professional baseball first baseman and outfielder. He played in Nippon Professional Baseball (NPB) for the Yokohama BayStars, Fukuoka SoftBank Hawks, and Tokyo Yakult Swallows from 2001 to 2022.

== Career ==
=== Yokohama BayStars ===
Yokohama BayStars selected Uchikawa with the first selection in the 2000 NPB draft.

On March 30, 2001, Uchikawa made his NPB debut.

He rose to prominence in 2008 with a league-leading .378 batting average.

=== Fukuoka SoftBank Hawks ===
During the 2010 offseason, he exercised his free agent option and after weeks of negotiations between the Yokohama BayStars, Hiroshima Toyo Carp, and Fukuoka SoftBank Hawks, he decided to sign a four-year deal with SoftBank worth up to 1.36 billion yen.

On December 2, 2020, he became a free agent.

=== Tokyo Yakult Swallows ===
On December 11, 2020, Uchikawa signed with Tokyo Yakult Swallows of NPB and held press conference.

On September 27, 2022, Uchikawa announced his retirement from professional baseball.

== International career ==
He was selected for the Japanese national baseball team in the 2009 World Baseball Classic, 2013 World Baseball Classic and 2017 World Baseball Classic.

== See also ==
- List of Nippon Professional Baseball career hits leaders
