= Akira Nakamura (baseball) =

Japanese baseball player (born 1989)

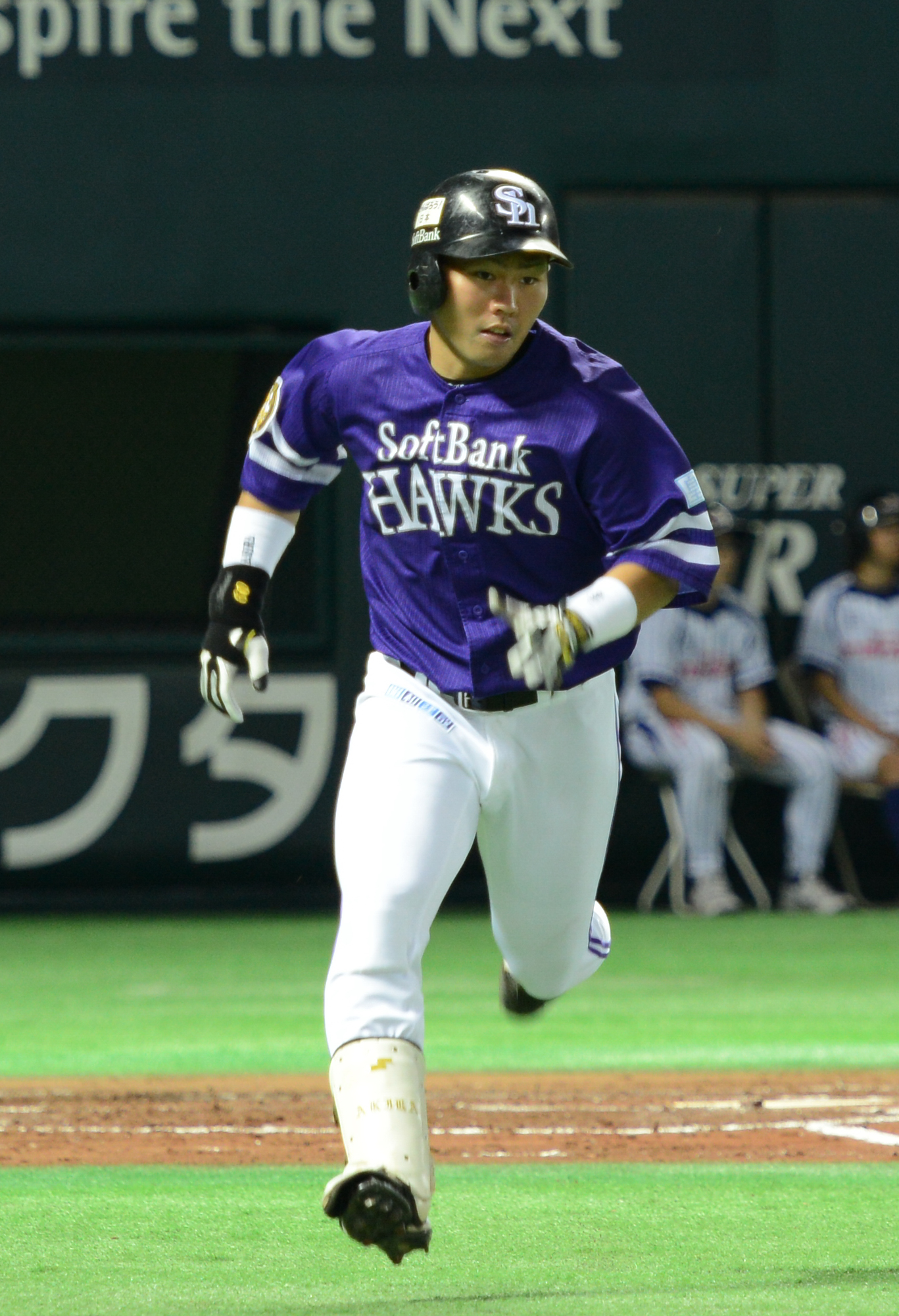
- Nakamura with the Fukuoka SoftBank Hawks

Fukuoka SoftBank Hawks – No. 7
- Outfielder
- Born: November 5, 1989 (age 36)
- Bats: Left Throws: Left

NPB debut
- 2011, for the Fukuoka SoftBank Hawks

NPB statistics (through 2025 season)
- Batting average: .275
- Home runs: 69
- Runs batted in: 553
- Stats at Baseball Reference

Teams
- Fukuoka SoftBank Hawks (2008–present)

Career highlights and awards
- Western League Batting Leader Award (2012); Western League On-base percentage Leader Award (2012); Pacific League Hits Leader (2014); 8× Japan Series champion (2011, 2014–2015, 2017–2020, 2025); 2× NPB All-Star (2018, 2023); Pacific League Climax Series Most Valuable Player Award (2020); 4× Pacific League Golden Glove Award (2020-2023); Japan Series Outstanding Player Award (2020)
Medals
Men's baseball
Representing Japan
WBSC Premier12
Bronze medal – third place	2015 Tokyo	Team

Akira Nakamura (中村 晃, born November 5, 1989) is a Japanese professional baseball outfielder for the Fukuoka SoftBank Hawks of Nippon Professional Baseball (NPB).

== Early baseball career ==
Nakamura participated with Kenshi Sugiya and Shohei Takashima in the 2nd grade summer the 88th Japanese High School Baseball Championship, 3rd grade spring the 79th Japanese High School Baseball Invitational Tournament and 3rd grade summer the 89th Japanese High School Baseball Championship at the Teikyo High School.

The match against Chiben Wakayama High School in the quarterfinals of the 88th Japanese High School Baseball Championship became a game that remains in the history of Japanese High School Baseball Championship.

== Professional career ==
On October 3, 2007, Nakamura was drafted by the Fukuoka SoftBank Hawks in the 2007 Nippon Professional Baseball draft.

=== 2008–2010 season ===
In the 2008–2010 season, Nakamura played in the Western League of NPB's minor leagues.

=== 2011–2015 season ===
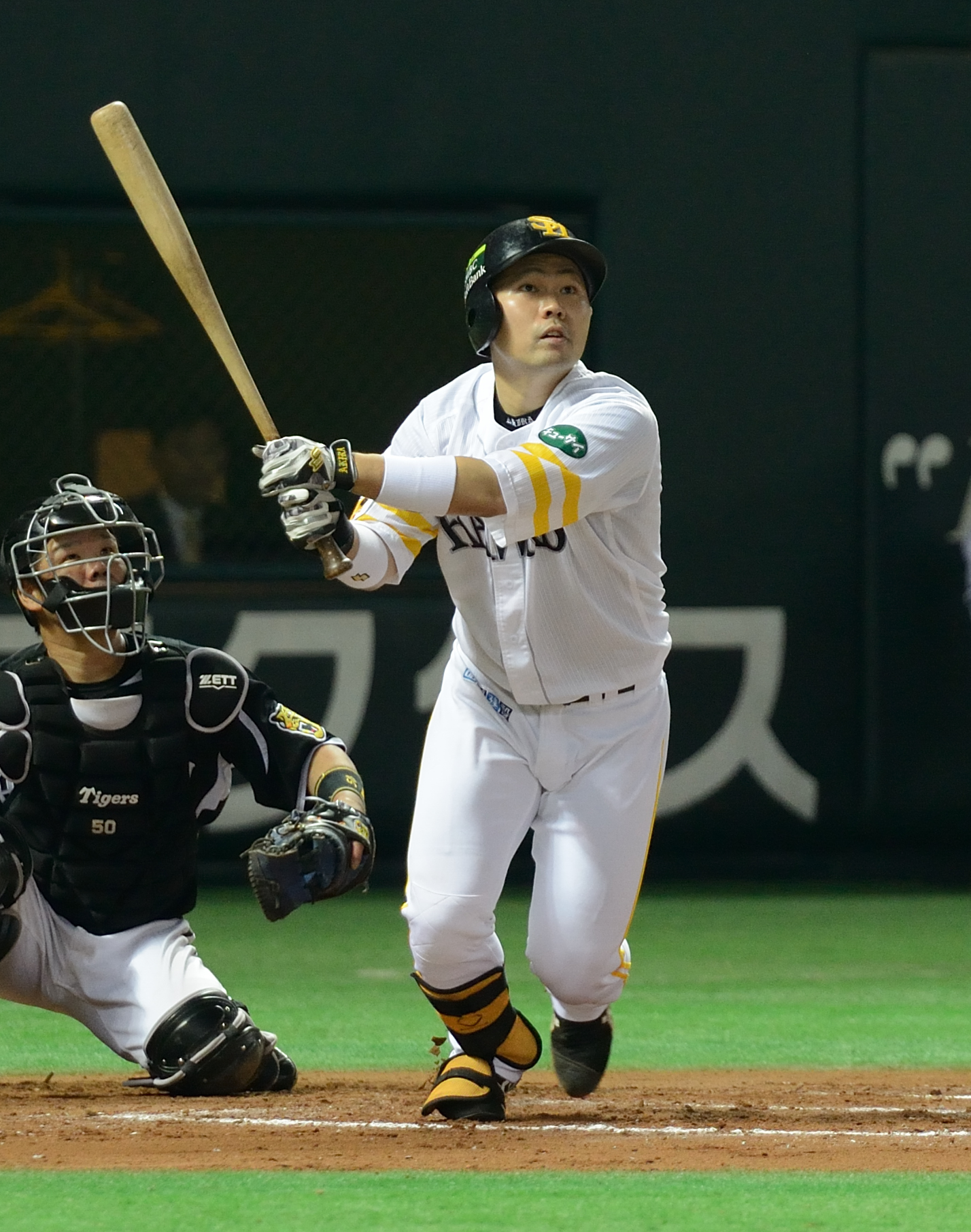
October 29, 2014, 2014 Japan Series Game 4, Nakamura's three-run Walk-off home run

On May 3, 2011, Nakamura debuted in the Pacific League against the Tohoku Rakuten Golden Eagles. And he recorded his first hit in the Pacific League on May 10. In 2011 season, Nakamura played 32 games in the Pacific League. And he was selected as the Japan Series roster in the 2011 Japan Series.

In the 2012 season, Nakamura played 39 games in the Pacific League. On November 21, he was honored for the Western League Batting Leader Award and the Western League On-base percentage Leader Award at the 2012 Professional Baseball Convention.

On June 23, 2013, Nakamura recorded his first home run in the Pacific League against the Tohoku Rakuten Golden Eagles. In 2013 season, he finished the regular season in 109 games with a batting average of .307, a 5 home runs, and a RBI of 44.

In the 2014 season, Nakamura finished the regular season in 143 games with a batting average of .308, a 4 home runs, and a RBI of 61. As a result, he won the Pacific League Hits Leader Award with 176 hits. And he contributed to the team's victory by hitting a three-run Walk-off home run from Seung-hwan Oh in Game 4 of the 2014 Japan Series.

In the 2015 season, Nakamura changed his uniform number from 60 to 7. He finished the regular season in 135 games with a batting average of .300, a one home runs, and a RBI of 39. And on October 25, he contributed to the team's victory by hitting a home run in the Japan Series for the second consecutive year in the 2015 Japan Series Game 2.

=== 2016–2020 season ===
In the 2016 season, Nakamura played in all 143 games and recorded a batting average of .287, a 7 home runs, and a RBI of 50.

In the 2017 season, Nakamura played in all 143 games and recorded a batting average of .270, a 6 home runs, and a RBI of 42. In the 2017 Pacific League Climax Series, where he played against the Tohoku Rakuten Golden Eagles, he recorded a reversal two-run home run in Game 3 on October 20, and a home run in Game 4 on October 21. In the 2017 Japan Series, which played against the Yokohama DeNA BayStars, he contributed to the team's victory by recording a reversal clutch hit in Game 2 on October 29 and a two-run home run in Game 5 on November 2.

In the 2018 season, Nakamura finished the regular season in 136 games with a batting average of .292, a 14 home runs, and a RBI of 57. And he selected Mynavi All-Star Game 2018. In the 2018 Japan Series, which played against Hiroshima Toyo Carp, he contributed to the team's victory by hitting a reversal RBI hit in Game 5 on November 1.

On March 23, 2019, Nakamura was diagnosed with Dysautonomia and left the team for medical treatment. He returned to the team on May 31, but only played 44 games in the regular season. However, he contributed to the team's third consecutive Japan Series victory by recording two days consecutive RBI hits in Game 2 Game 3 of the 2019 Pacific League Climax Series in the postseason.

On September 17, 2020, Nakamura recorded a total of 1,000 hits. And on October 8, he recorded a total of 1,000 games appearance. In 2020 season, Nakamura finished the regular season in 100 games with a batting average of .271, a 6 home runs, and a RBI of 50. In the 2020 Pacific League Climax Series, where Nakamura played against the Chiba Lotte Marines, Nakamura won the 2020 Pacific League Climax Series Most Valuable Player Award by hitting a home run for two at-bats in a row in Game 2. In the 2020 Japan Series, where he played against the Yomiuri Giants, he contributed to the team's 4th consecutive Japan Series victory by recording hit a RBI hit in Game 1 and a two-run home run in Game 3. And he won the 2020 Japan Series Outstanding Player Award. December 17, Nakamura was honored for the Pacific League Golden Glove Award for the first time at the NPB AWARD 2020.

=== 2021 season–present ===
In the 2021 season, Nakamura had struggled with a batting average in the 10% range since the start of the season, but on April 9, he hit a two-RBI hits in a comeback win against the Hokkaido Nippon-Ham Fighters. On April 19, against the Saitama Seibu Lions, he recorded his first homer of the season. On October 5 against the Tohoku Rakuten Golden Eagles, he hit a grand slam for the first time in three years. He finished the regular season with a .245 batting average, eight home runs, and 56 runs batted in in 139 games. On December 15, 2021, Nakamura won his second consecutive Pacific League Golden Glove Award and was honored at the NPB Awards 2021.

On April 27, 2022, Nakamura hit a home run against the Saitama Seibu Lions, hitting a foul pole in the direction of the light, and was presented with a year's supply of Martai Stick Ramen (Stick instant noodles) by MARUTAI CO., LTD. which has the naming rights to the "Martai Stick Ramen Pole". He was taken off the first team registration on July 11 because of a sore back and returned on July 27 with a separated flesh in his side. He had a good month of August with a .370 batting average, two home runs and six RBI through 11 days. However, he tested positive for COVID-19 and was again removed from the first team registration by regulation on August 19. On September 3, he made his comeback against the Saitama Seibu Lions and was named in the starting lineup. He hit his fifth home run of the season, a two-run shot against the Tohoku Rakuten Golden Eagles on September 7. He finished the regular season with a .253 batting average, seven home runs, and 51 runs batted in in 114 games, despite two accidents that caused him to leave the game twice. On November 25, 2022, Nakamura won his third consecutive Pacific League Golden Glove Award and is honored at the NPB Awards 2022.

On July 19, 2023, Nakamura participated the All-Star Game for the second time in the Mynavi All-Star Game 2023. In a game against the Hokkaido Nippon-Ham Fighters on September 30, he recorded his first walk-off home run in the regular season. He finished the regular season with a .274 batting average, a 5 home runs, and a 37 RBIs batted in 136 games. On November 28, 2023, his fourth consecutive Pacific League Golden Glove Award and is honored at the NPB Awards 2023.

== International career ==
In 2010, Nakamura was elected to the Japan national baseball team at the 2010 Intercontinental Cup.

In 2015, Nakamura was elected to the Japan national baseball team at the 2015 WBSC Premier12. He contributed to the team's victory by scoring two hits in the semi-final against the Puerto Rico.
