= Yuya Hasegawa =

Japanese baseball player (born 1984)

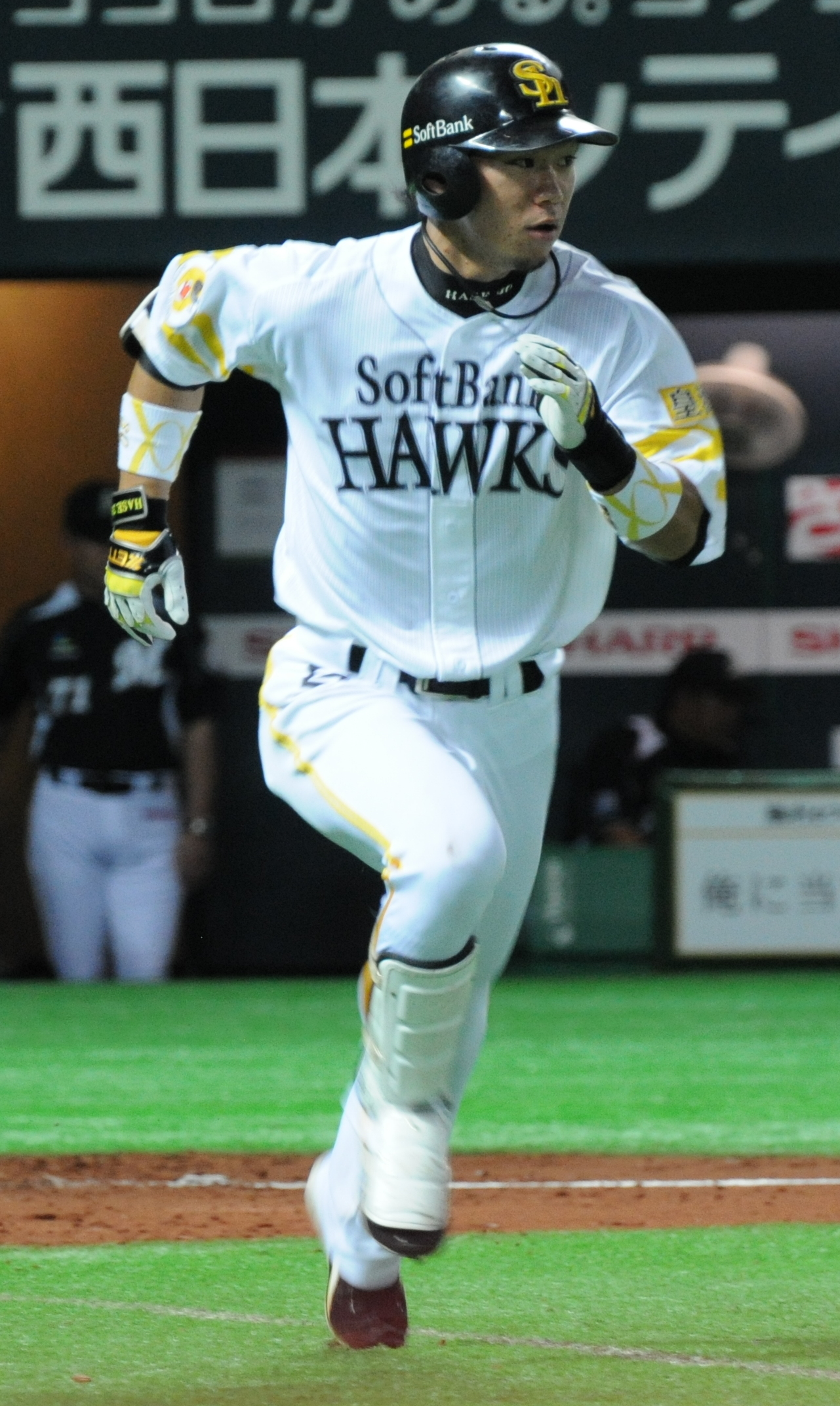
- Hasegawa with the Fukuoka SoftBank Hawks.

Fukuoka SoftBank Hawks – No. 025
- Outfielder / Coach
- Born: December 22, 1984 (age 41); Tsuruoka, Yamagata, Japan
- Batted: Left Threw: Right

NPB debut
- April 22, 2008, for the Fukuoka SoftBank Hawks

Last NPB appearance
- October 21, 2021, for the Fukuoka SoftBank Hawks

NPB statistics
- Batting average: .288
- Home runs: 76
- RBI: 434
- Hits: 1,108
- Stats at Baseball Reference

Teams
- As player: Fukuoka SoftBank Hawks (2007–2021); As coach: Fukuoka SoftBank Hawks (2022–2023, 2025–present)

Career highlights and awards
- 4× NPB All-Star (2009, 2013, 2014, 2016); 1× Best Nine Award (2013); 1× Pacific League Batting Champion (2013); 1× Pacific League Hits champions (2013); 1× Interleague play (NPB) MVP (2013); 7× Japan Series champion (2011, 2014–2015, 2017–2020)

Yuya Hasegawa (長谷川 勇也, Hasegawa Yūya; born 22 December 1984) is a Japanese former professional baseball outfielder, and current research and development coach for the Fukuoka SoftBank Hawks of Nippon Professional Baseball (NPB).

Hasegawa played for Fukuoka starting in 2007, wearing number 24. In 2009, he batted .312.

== Professional career ==
On November 21, 2006, Hasegawa was drafted by the Fukuoka SoftBank Hawks in the 2006 Nippon Professional Baseball draft.

=== 2007–2010 season ===
In 2007 season, Hasegawa played in the Western League of NPB's minor leagues.

On April 22, 2008, Hasegawa debuted in the Pacific League against the Tohoku Rakuten Golden Eagles. And he recorded his first hit. In 2008 season, Hasegawa finished the regular season in 71 games with a batting average of .235, a 4 home runs, and a RBI of 24.

In 2009 season, Hasegawa finished the regular season in 143 games with a batting average of .312, a 7 home runs, and a RBI of 44. And he selected MAZDA All-Star Game 2009.

In 2010 season, Hasegawa finished the regular season in 134 games with a batting average of .255, a 3 home runs, and a RBI of 32.

=== 2011–2015 season ===
In 2011 season, Hasegawa finished the regular season in 125 games with a batting average of .293, a 4 home runs, and a RBI of 34. And he scored a batting average of .545 in the 2011 Pacific League Climax Series against Saitama Seibu Lions and contributed to the victory by hitting a clutch hit, which was tied in the 10th inning in Game 3.

In 2012 season, Hasegawa changed his uniform number from 30 to 24. He finished the regular season in 126 games with a batting average of .278, a 4 home runs, and a RBI of 37.

In 2013 season, Hasegawa recorded a batting average of .418 in the interleague play and won the interleague play Most Valuable Player Award. And he selected MAZDA All-Star Game 2013. He played in all 144 games and recorded a batting average of .341, a 19 home runs, and a RBI of 83. As a result, he won the Pacific League Batting Leader Award and the Pacific League Hitting Leader Award with 198 hits. On November 26, he was honored for the Pacific League Batting Leader Award, the Pacific League Hitting Leader Award, and the Pacific League Best Nine Award at the 2013 Professional Baseball Convention.

On July 18, 2014, Hasegawa participated in the MAZDA All-Star Game 2014. On September 3, Hasegawa injured his right ankle in a close play at home base against the Orix Buffaloes. In 2014 season, he finished the regular season in 135 games with a batting average of .300, a 6 home runs, and a RBI of 55. And he participated in the 2014 Japan Series. On December 4, Hasegawa had surgery on his right ankle.

In 2015 season, Hasegawa finished the regular season in 30 games with a batting average of .224, a 5 home runs, and a RBI of 12. And he participated in the 2015 Japan Series.

=== 2016–2021 season ===
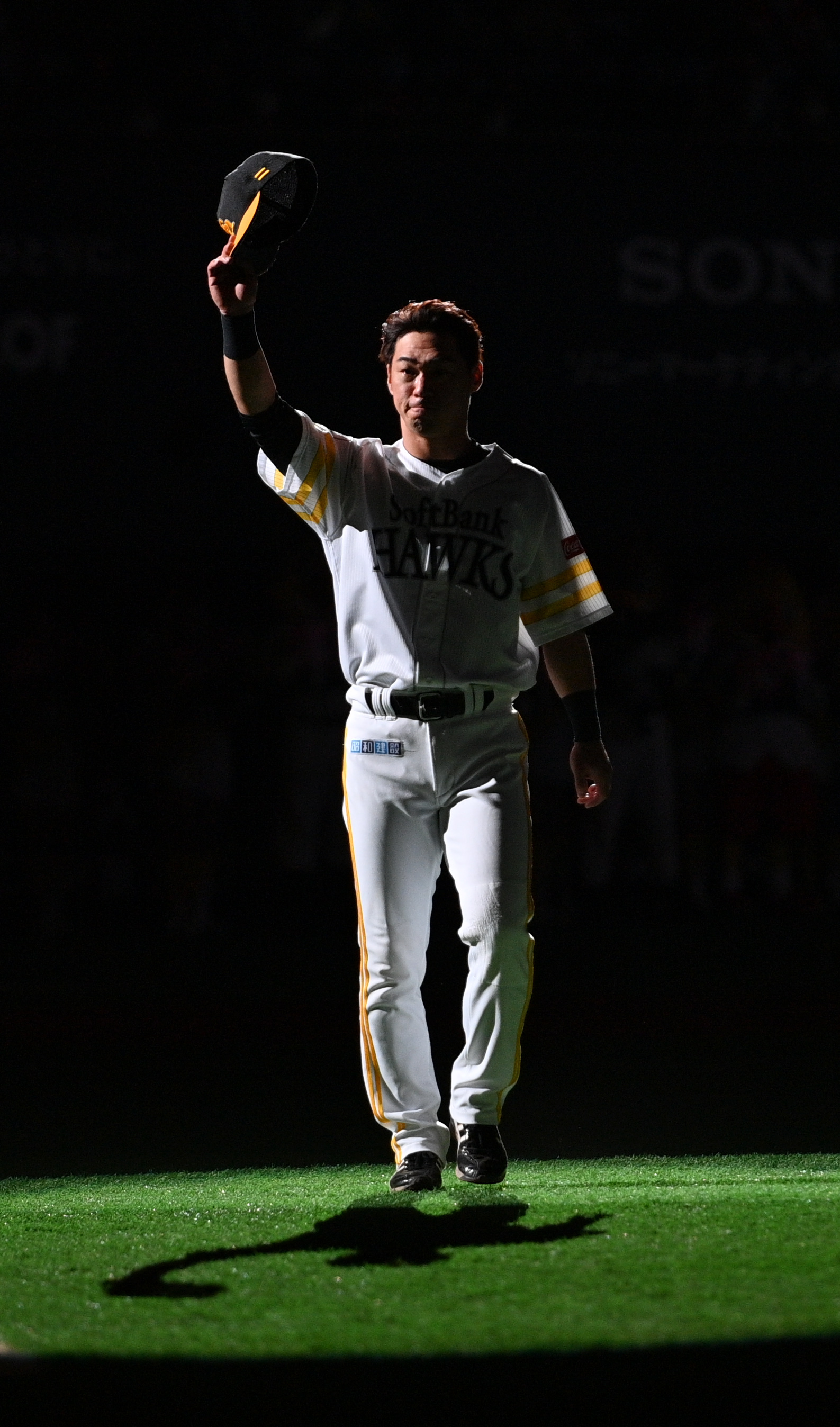
Hasegawa's retirement ceremony held on October 21, 2021, at the Fukuoka PayPay Dome.

In 2016 season, Hasegawa selected MAZDA All-Star Game 2016. On August 27, he recorded a total of 1,000 hits. He finished the regular season in 122 games with a batting average of .271, a 10 home runs, and a RBI of 51.

In 2017 season, Hasegawa only participated in 23 games. However, he contributed to the victory by recording his first home run in the Japan Series in the 2017 Japan Series. On November 21, he underwent reoperation on his right ankle.

In 2018 season, Hasegawa's return was delayed to June 15 due to the effects of surgery, but he finished the regular season in 55 games with a batting average of .287, a 5 home runs, and a RBI of 20. And he participated in the 2018 Japan Series and recorded a RBI hit in Game 4.

In 2019 season, Hasegawa only participated in 25 games. However, he contributed to the team's third consecutive victory in the Japan Series by scoring a Sacrifice fly in the 2019 Japan Series Game 3.

On July 6, 2020, Hasegawa left the team due to a muscle contusion on his right flank. On August 1, he underwent a Polymerase chain reaction for Coronavirus disease 2019 and was tested positive. Partly because of that, his return was extended until September 29, with only 29 games played. However, he participated in the 2020 Japan Series and contributed to the team's fourth consecutive victory.

On October 8, 2021, Hasegawa announced his retirement, and a press conference announcing his retirement was held on the following day, the 9th. On October 21, he entered the game against the Hokkaido Nippon-Ham Fighters in the bottom of the 7th inning as a substitute and finished his last active at bat. After the game, a retirement ceremony was held for Hasegawa. He finished his final active season with a .260 batting average, 26 hits, three home runs, and 19 RBI in 71 games.

=== After retirement ===
Hasegawa has been named first squad hitting coach for the Fukuoka Softbank Hawks beginning with the 2022 season.

Hasegawa was transferred to the research and development staff, where he conducts player movement analysis since the 2024 season.
