= Shuto =

Shuto or variants may refer to:

- A knifehand strike, known in Japanese as shutō-uchi
- Shutō (seafood), Japanese tuna liver seafood pickle
- Shuto Expressway (首都高速道路, Shuto Kōsoku-dōro) network of toll expressways
- Šuto Orizari Municipality (Macedonian: Шуто Оризари) municipality
- Shuuto, long "shootball" pitch in Japanese baseball

== People with the name ==
- Shuto Abe (安部 柊斗, born 1997), Japanese footballer
- Shuto Ando (1994) Japanese basketball player
- Shuto Inaba (1990) Japanese footballer
- Shuto Kawai (1993) Japanese footballer
- Shuto Kono (1993) Japanese footballer
- Shuto Machino (1999) Japanese footballer
- Shuto Takajo (髙城俊人, born 1993), Japanese professional baseball player
- Shuto Yamamoto (1985) Japanese footballer
- Ukyo Shuto (周東 佑京, born 1996), Japanese professional baseball player
