= 2017 Pacific League Climax Series =

Japanese baseball series

First stage
Team (Wins)		Manager	Season
Tohoku Rakuten Golden Eagles (2)		Masataka Nashida	77–63–3 (.550), 15½ GB
Saitama Seibu Lions (1)		Hatsuhiko Tsuji	79–61–3 (.563), 13½ GB
- Dates: October 14–16

Final stage
Team (Wins)		Manager	Season
Fukuoka SoftBank Hawks (4)		Kimiyasu Kudo	94–49–0 (.657), 13½ GA
Tohoku Rakuten Golden Eagles (2)		Masataka Nashida	77–63–3 (.550), 15½ GB
- Dates: October 18–22
- MVP: Seiichi Uchikawa (SoftBank)

The 2017 Pacific League Climax Series (PLCS) consisted of two consecutive series, Stage 1 being a best-of-three series and Stage 2 being a best-of-six with the top seed being awarded a one-win advantage. The winner of the series advanced to the 2017 Japan Series, where they competed against the 2017 Central League Climax Series winner. The top three regular-season finishers played in the two series. The PLCS began on with the first game of Stage 1 on October 14 and ended with the final game of Stage 2 on October 22.

== First stage ==
=== Summary ===
Tohoku Rakuten Golden Eagles won the series, 2–1.

Game	Date	Score	Location	Time	Attendance
1	October 14	Tohoku Rakuten Golden Eagles – 0, Saitama Seibu Lions – 10	MetLife Dome	3:00	32,547
2	October 15	Tohoku Rakuten Golden Eagles – 4, Saitama Seibu Lions – 1	MetLife Dome	3:12	32,508
3	October 16	Tohoku Rakuten Golden Eagles – 5, Saitama Seibu Lions – 2	MetLife Dome	3:26	31,755

=== Game 1 ===
Saturday, October 14, 2017, 1:02 pm (JST) at MetLife Dome in Tokorozawa, Saitama Prefecture
Team	1	2	3	4	5	6	7	8	9	R	H	E
Rakuten	0	0	0	0	0	0	0	0	0	0	5	0
Seibu	2	0	5	0	0	3	0	0	X	10	12	1
WP: Yusei Kikuchi (1–0) LP: Takahiro Norimoto (0–1); Home runs: RAK: None; SEI: Hideto Asamura (1), Takeya Nakamura (1); Attendance: 32,547

=== Game 2 ===
Sunday, October 15, 2017, 1:02 pm (JST) at MetLife Dome in Tokorozawa, Saitama Prefecture
Team	1	2	3	4	5	6	7	8	9	R	H	E
Rakuten	1	2	0	0	0	0	1	0	0	4	9	0
Seibu	0	0	0	0	0	0	0	1	0	1	6	0
WP: Takayuki Kishi (1–0) LP: Ken Togame (0–1) Sv: Yuki Matsui (1); Home runs: RAK: Eigoro Mogi (1); SEI: None; Attendance: 32,508

=== Game 3 ===
Monday, October 16, 2017, 6:01 pm (JST) at MetLife Dome in Tokorozawa, Saitama Prefecture
Team	1	2	3	4	5	6	7	8	9	R	H	E
Rakuten	1	0	0	1	0	0	0	3	0	5	7	1
Seibu	0	0	0	0	1	0	0	0	1	2	6	1
WP: Sung Chia-Hao (1–0) LP: Ryoma Nogami (0–1); Home runs: RAK: Zelous Wheeler (1), Shintaro Masuda (1); SEI: Hideto Asamura (2); Attendance: 31,755

== Final stage ==
=== Summary ===
Fukuoka SoftBank Hawks won the series, 4–2*.

Game	Date	Score	Location	Time	Attendance
1	October 18	Tohoku Rakuten Golden Eagles – 3, Fukuoka SoftBank Hawks – 2	Yafuoku Dome	3:05	35,125
2	October 19	Tohoku Rakuten Golden Eagles – 2, Fukuoka SoftBank Hawks – 1	Yafuoku Dome	3:31	36,380
3	October 20	Tohoku Rakuten Golden Eagles – 5, Fukuoka SoftBank Hawks – 7	Yafuoku Dome	3:16	35,333
4	October 21	Tohoku Rakuten Golden Eagles – 3, Fukuoka SoftBank Hawks – 4	Yafuoku Dome	3:21	37,455
5	October 22	Tohoku Rakuten Golden Eagles – 0, Fukuoka SoftBank Hawks – 7	Yafuoku Dome	2:41	35,387

* The Pacific League regular season champion is given a one-game advantage in the Final Stage.

=== Game 1 ===
Wednesday, October 18, 2017, 6:01 pm (JST) at Fukuoka Yahuoku! Dome in Fukuoka, Fukuoka Prefecture
Team	1	2	3	4	5	6	7	8	9	R	H	E
Rakuten	1	1	0	1	0	0	0	0	0	3	5	0
SoftBank	0	0	0	0	0	1	0	0	1	2	6	0
WP: Takahiro Shiomi (1–0) LP: Nao Higashihama (0–1) Sv: Yuki Matsui (1); Home runs: RAK: Eigoro Mogi (1), Japhet Amador (1), Zelous Wheeler (1); SOF: Kenta Imamiya (1), Seiichi Uchikawa (1); Attendance: 35,125

=== Game 2 ===
Thursday, October 19, 2017, 6:00 pm (JST) at Fukuoka Yahuoku! Dome in Fukuoka, Fukuoka Prefecture
Team	1	2	3	4	5	6	7	8	9	R	H	E
Rakuten	1	0	0	0	0	0	1	0	0	2	7	0
SoftBank	0	0	0	1	0	0	0	0	0	1	6	1
WP: Sung Chia-Hao (1–0) LP: Kodai Senga (0–1) Sv: Yuki Matsui (2); Home runs: RAK: None; SOF: Seiichi Uchikawa (2); Attendance: 36,380

=== Game 3 ===
Friday, October 20, 2017, 6:01 pm (JST) at Fukuoka Yahuoku! Dome in Fukuoka, Fukuoka Prefecture
Team	1	2	3	4	5	6	7	8	9	R	H	E
Rakuten	1	2	0	0	2	0	0	0	0	5	10	0
SoftBank	2	0	3	0	0	0	0	2	X	7	10	0
WP: Sho Iwasaki (1–0) LP: Hiroyuki Fukuyama (0–1) Sv: Dennis Sarfate (1); Home runs: RAK: Japhet Amador (2); SOF: Seiichi Uchikawa (3), Akira Nakamura (1); Attendance: 35,333

=== Game 4 ===
Saturday, October 21, 2017, 1:00 pm (JST) at Fukuoka Yahuoku! Dome in Fukuoka, Fukuoka Prefecture
Team	1	2	3	4	5	6	7	8	9	R	H	E
Rakuten	0	0	0	2	1	0	0	0	0	3	5	0
SoftBank	0	1	1	0	0	2	0	0	X	4	8	0
WP: Shuta Ishikawa (1–0) LP: Sung Chia-Hao (1–1) Sv: Dennis Sarfate (2); Home runs: RAK: Ginji Akaminai (1); SOF: Alfredo Despaigne (1), Seiichi Uchikawa (4), Akira Nakamura (2); Attendance: 37,455

=== Game 5 ===
Sunday, October 22, 2017, 1:00 pm (JST) at Fukuoka Yahuoku! Dome in Fukuoka, Fukuoka Prefecture
Team	1	2	3	4	5	6	7	8	9	R	H	E
Rakuten	0	0	0	0	0	0	0	0	0	0	7	0
SoftBank	3	0	0	3	0	0	0	1	X	7	11	0
WP: Shota Takeda (1–0) LP: Manabu Mima (0–1); Home runs: RAK: None; SOF: Nobuhiro Matsuda (1); Attendance: 35,387
