= Haruhiro Hamaguchi =

Japanese baseball player (born 1995)

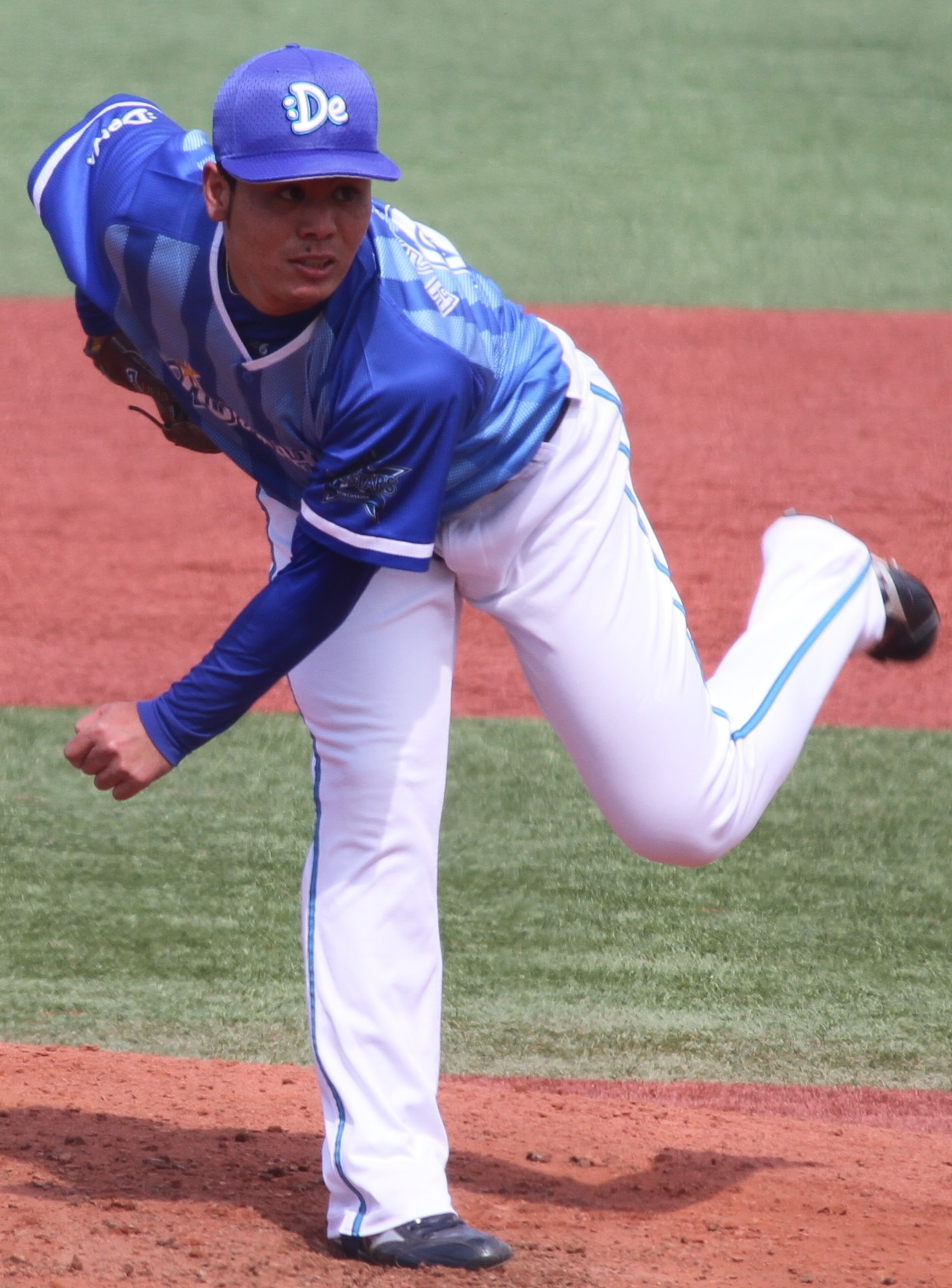
- Pitcher
- Born: March 16, 1995 (age 31); Miyaki District, Saga, Japan
- Batted: Left Threw: Left

NPB debut
- April 2, 2017, for the Yokohama DeNA BayStars

Last NPB appearance
- October 4, 2024, for the Yokohama DeNA BayStars

Career statistics
- Win–loss record: 44–46
- Earned Run Average: 3.76
- Strikeouts: 658
- Stats at Baseball Reference

Teams
- Yokohama DeNA BayStars (2017–2024); Fukuoka SoftBank Hawks (2025)

Career highlights and awards
- Japan Series champion (2024)

Haruhiro Hamaguchi (濵口 遥大, Hamaguchi Haruhiro; born March 16, 1995) is a Japanese professional baseball pitcher for the Fukuoka SoftBank Hawks of Nippon Professional Baseball (NPB). He previously played in NPB for the Yokohama DeNA BayStars.

== Career ==
=== Yokohaka DeNA BayStars ===
Hamaguchi began his career in 2017 with the Yokohama DeNA BayStars. In Game 4 of the 2017 Japan Series, with DeNA facing elimination, Hamaguchi did not allow a hit over 7 1/3 innings.

On October 10, 2018, Hamaguchi was selected to the Japan national baseball team at the 2018 MLB Japan All-Star Series.

=== Fukuoka SoftBank Hawks ===
Hamaguchi joined the Fukuoka SoftBank Hawks in 2025. On April 23, 2025, it was announced that Hamaguchi had undergone an endoscopic resection for ossification of the 9th and 10th thoracic yellow ligaments. He additionally underwent an elbow joint cleaning procedure due to arthritis, and was ruled out for three-to-four months.
