= Joe Wieland =

American baseball player (born 1990)

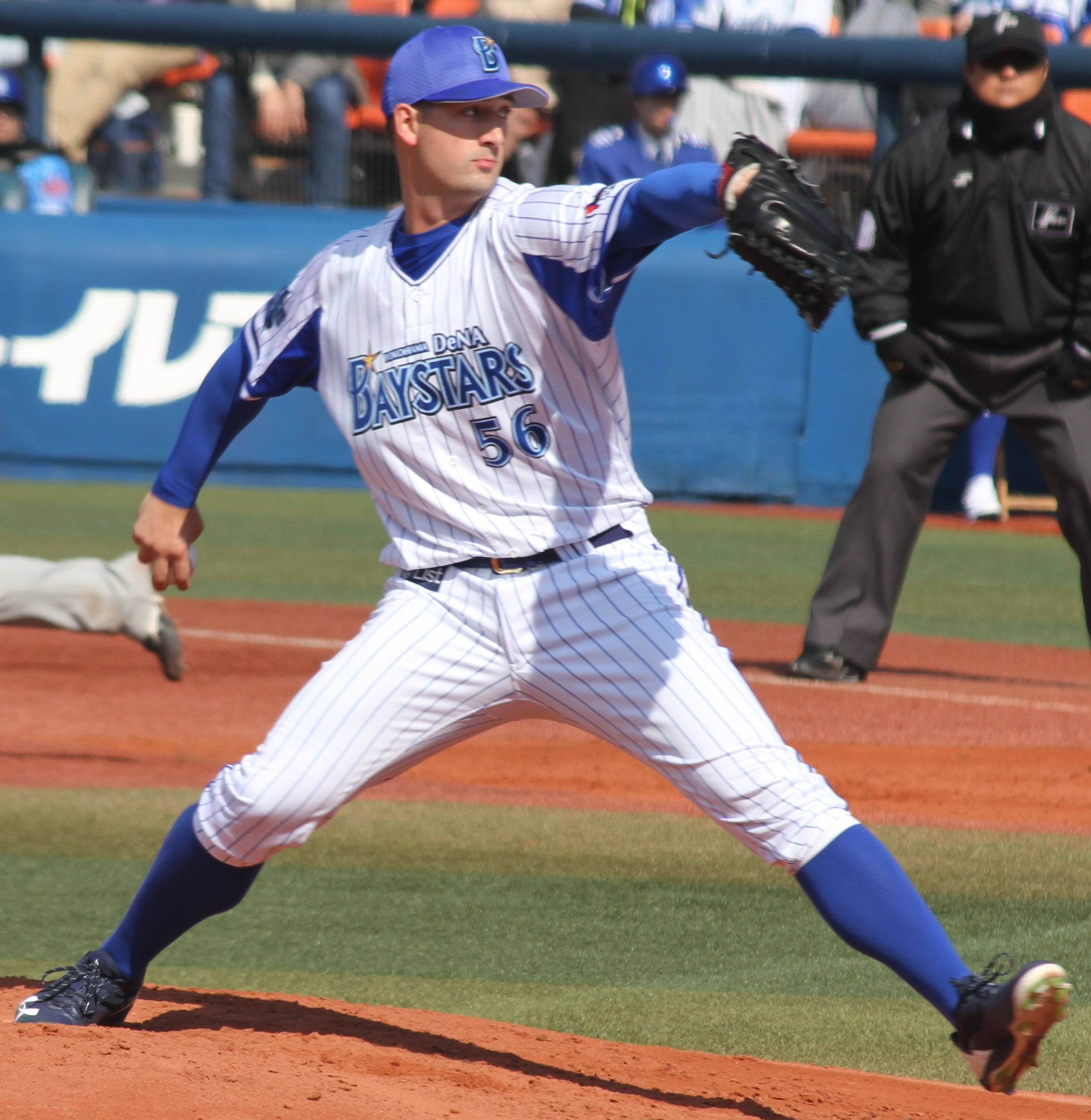
- Wieland with the Yokohama DeNA BayStars
- Pitcher
- Born: January 21, 1990 (age 36); Reno, Nevada, U.S.
- Batted: Right Threw: Right

Professional debut
- MLB: April 14, 2012, for the San Diego Padres
- NPB: April 6, 2017, for the Yokohama DeNA BayStars
- KBO: March 27, 2019, for the Kia Tigers

Last appearance
- MLB: August 12, 2016, for the Seattle Mariners
- NPB: October 10, 2018, for the Yokohama DeNA BayStars
- KBO: September 13, 2019, for the Kia Tigers

MLB statistics
- Win–loss record: 1–6
- Earned run average: 6.32
- Strikeouts: 39

NPB statistics
- Win–loss record: 14–11
- Earned run average: 3.80
- Strikeouts: 194

KBO statistics
- Win–loss record: 8–10
- Earned run average: 4.75
- Strikeouts: 137
- Stats at Baseball Reference

Teams
- San Diego Padres (2012, 2014); Los Angeles Dodgers (2015); Seattle Mariners (2016); Yokohama DeNA BayStars (2017–2018); Kia Tigers (2019)

Joseph Andrew Wieland (born January 21, 1990) is an American former professional baseball pitcher. He played in Major League Baseball (MLB) for the San Diego Padres, Los Angeles Dodgers, and Seattle Mariners. He also played in Nippon Professional Baseball (NPB) for the Yokohama DeNA BayStars, and in the KBO League the Kia Tigers.

== Early life ==
Wieland was born in Reno, Nevada on January 21, 1990. He was named Nevada State Player of the Year by the Las Vegas Review-Journal and the Reno Gazette-Journal while at Bishop Manogue High School in Reno, Nevada. Wieland committed to playing college baseball at San Diego State.

== Professional career ==
=== Texas Rangers ===
Wieland was drafted by the Texas Rangers in the fourth round of the 2008 Major League Baseball draft. He signed with the Rangers and did not play for San Diego State. Wieland spent 2009 with the Single-A Hickory Crawdads where he posted a 5.31 ERA in 19 games. He opened 2010 with the Crawdads, but an improved 3.34 ERA in 15 games earned him a promotion to the California League High-A Bakersfield Blaze in July. In 2011, Wieland started the year with the Myrtle Beach Pelicans, the Rangers' new High-A affiliate, and then graduated to Double-A in late June. On July 29, 2011, while pitching for the Frisco RoughRiders, Wieland threw a no-hitter against the San Antonio Missions, the Padres Double-A affiliate. Wieland had a 1.23 ERA in 7 starts for the RoughRiders.

=== San Diego Padres ===
On July 31, 2011, Wieland and Robbie Erlin were traded to the San Diego Padres for Mike Adams. He finished the year with the Double-A Missions, posting a 2.77 ERA in 5 starts. He had 8.7 strike-outs per 9 innings across all three clubs in 2011.

Wieland started 2012 with the Triple-A Tucson Padres, but only made 2 starts before he was called up to the Major League team.

Wieland was called up to join the Padres' rotation when both Tim Stauffer and Dustin Moseley went on the disabled list early in the season. He made his Major League debut on April 14, 2012, against the Los Angeles Dodgers, allowing six runs in five innings to take the loss. Wieland made five starts for the Padres, losing four of them, and posted a 4.55 ERA before he went to the disabled list in May with shoulder tightness. He underwent a season-ending Tommy John surgery on July 27, 2012.

Wieland began the 2013 season on the 60-day disabled list as he was still recovering from the surgery. He began a throwing program at around mid-season but he suffered a number of setbacks due to soreness and a stress reaction and missed the entire season. He underwent arthroscopic surgery on his elbow at the start of the 2014 season and did not make his return to the Padres until September 6, 2014. In four appearances for the Padres in 2014, he allowed nine runs in 11 innings. He finally picked up his first MLB win on September 24 against the Colorado Rockies.

=== Los Angeles Dodgers ===
On December 18, 2014, he was traded to the Los Angeles Dodgers (along with Yasmani Grandal and Zach Eflin) in exchange for Matt Kemp, Tim Federowicz and cash. He was assigned to the Triple–A Oklahoma City Dodgers.

Wieland was called up to the Dodgers on May 6, 2015, to start a game against the Milwaukee Brewers. He allowed six runs in 4 2/3 innings and was promptly optioned back to Triple–A following the game. He made a second start on September 9, allowing two runs in four innings. In 21 starts (and one relief appearance) for Oklahoma City, he was 10–5 with a 4.59 ERA. The Dodgers re-signed him to a one-year, $590,000 contract after the season to avoid salary arbitration.

=== Seattle Mariners ===
On January 12, 2016, Wieland was traded to the Seattle Mariners in exchange for minor league infielder Erick Mejia. The Mariners traded Wieland to the Atlanta Braves on September 14, and he was assigned to the Triple-A Gwinnett Braves.

=== Yokohama DeNA BayStars ===
On November 7, 2016, it was announced that Wieland had signed with the Yokohama DeNA BayStars of Nippon Professional Baseball for the 2017 season.

=== Kia Tigers ===
On December 5, 2018, Wieland signed with the Kia Tigers of the KBO League. He became a free agent following the 2019 season.

=== Sugar Land Lightning Sloths ===
In July 2020, Wieland signed on to play for the Sugar Land Lightning Sloths of the Constellation Energy League (a makeshift four-team independent league created as a result of the COVID-19 pandemic) for the 2020 season. He was subsequently named to the league's all-star team.

=== Chicago Cubs ===
On September 10, 2020, Wieland signed a minor league contract with the Chicago Cubs and was added to their 60-man player pool.

=== Tampa Bay Rays ===
On May 11, 2022, Wieland signed a minor league deal with the Tampa Bay Rays. Wieland appeared in eight games split between the rookie-level Florida Complex League Rays and the Triple-A Durham Bulls, recording a cumulative 1–1 record and 1.93 ERA with 15 strikeouts in 18 2/3 innings pitched. He was released by the Rays on August 15.

=== Oakland Athletics ===
On January 19, 2023, Wieland signed a minor league contract with the Oakland Athletics organization. In 23 games for the Triple–A Las Vegas Aviators, registering a 4–4 record and 8.16 ERA with 27 strikeouts in 32 innings pitched. On July 4, Wieland was released by Oakland.

=== Chicago Dogs ===
On August 20, 2023, Wieland signed with the Chicago Dogs of the American Association of Professional Baseball. In 3 starts for Chicago, Wieland recorded a 1.76 ERA with 24 strikeouts across 15 1/3 innings pitched.

=== Olmecas de Tabasco ===
On February 26, 2024, Wieland signed with the Olmecas de Tabasco of the Mexican League. In 9 games (6 starts) for Tabasco, he logged a 4–1 record and 2.95 ERA with 44 strikeouts across 39 2/3 innings pitched.

=== Uni-President Lions ===
On March 8, 2025, Wieland signed with the Uni-President Lions of the Chinese Professional Baseball League. He did not make an appearance for the Lions' main team, instead spending time with the farm team. On July 26, Wieland elected to retire from baseball, despite the Lions offering him a first team roster spot following the departure of C. C. Mercedes.

== Coaching career ==
On February 6, 2026, Wieland was announced as a minor league pitching rehab coordinator within the Athletics organization.

== Scouting report ==
Wieland throws from a three quarters angle with a repeatable delivery. He throws four pitches: a two seam fastball, a four seam fastball, a curveball and a rare changeup.
