= Yoshi Tsutsugo =

Japanese baseball player (born 1991)

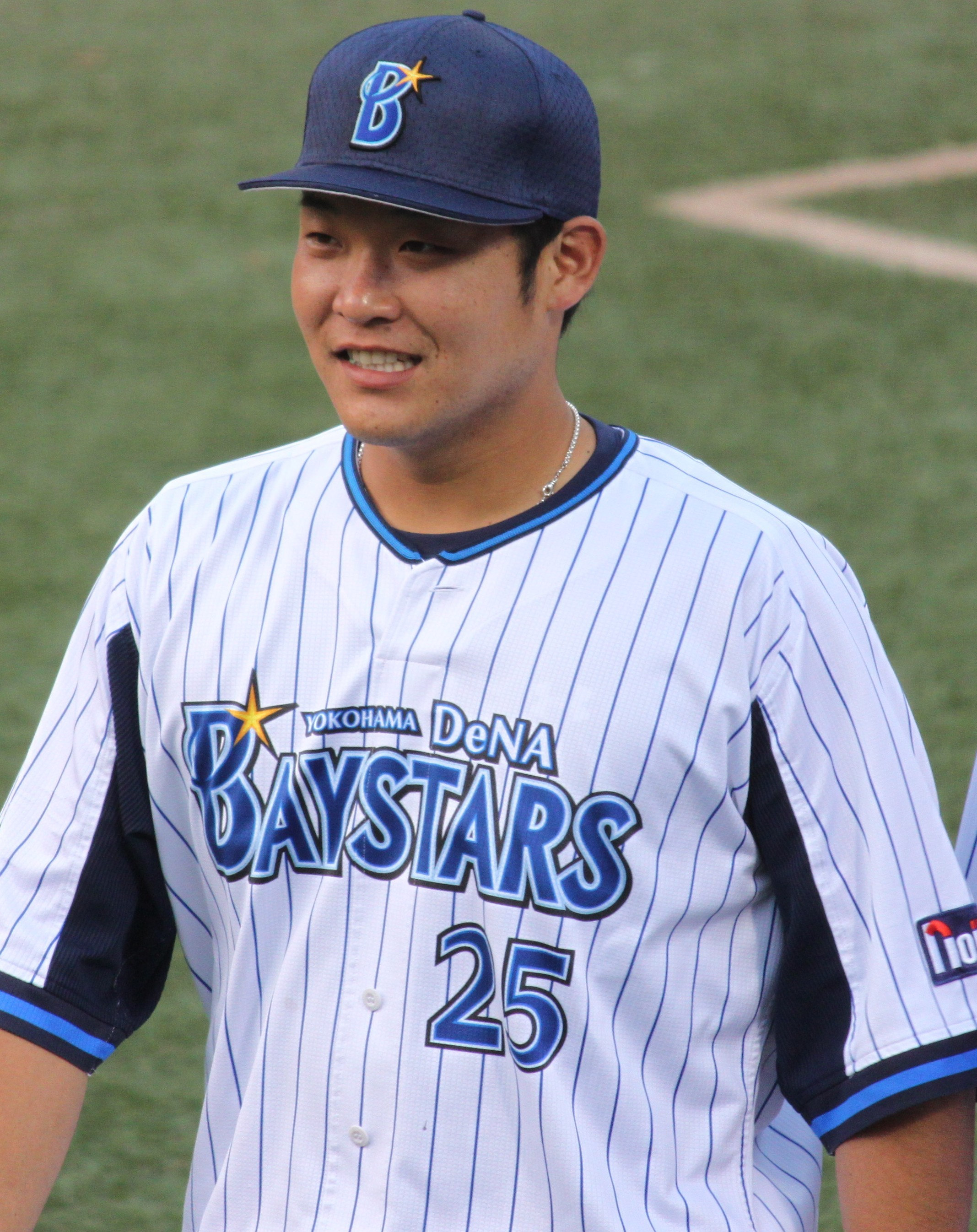
- Tsutsugo with the Yokohama DeNA BayStars

Yokohama DeNA BayStars – No. 25
- First baseman / Outfielder
- Born: November 26, 1991 (age 34); Hashimoto, Wakayama, Japan
- Bats: Left Throws: Right

Professional debut
- NPB: October 5, 2010, for the Yokohama BayStars
- MLB: July 24, 2020, for the Tampa Bay Rays

NPB statistics (through August 18, 2026)
- Batting average: .277
- Home runs: 246
- Runs batted in: 715

MLB statistics (through 2022 season)
- Batting average: .197
- Home runs: 18
- Runs batted in: 75
- Stats at Baseball Reference

Teams
- Yokohama BayStars/Yokohama DeNA BayStars (2010–2019); Tampa Bay Rays (2020–2021); Los Angeles Dodgers (2021); Pittsburgh Pirates (2021–2022); Yokohama DeNA BayStars (2024–present)

Career highlights and awards
- Japan Series champion (2024); 6× NPB All-Star (2015–2019, 2024); Central League home run leader (2016); Central League RBI leader (2016); Central League Batting Champion (2016, 2018); Central League OBP Leader (2016, 2018); 3× Central League Best Nine Award (2015–2017); NPB All-Star Game MVP (2016); 2× NPB Home Run Derby winner (2015, 2018)
Medals
Men's baseball
Representing Japan
WBSC Premier12
Bronze medal – third place	2015 Tokyo	Team
Asian Junior Baseball Championship
Bronze medal – third place	2009 Seoul	Team

Yoshitomo "Yoshi" Tsutsugo (筒香 嘉智, Tsutsugō Yoshitomo; Japanese pronunciation: [tsɯ̥tsɯꜜɡoː joɕi̥tomo], born November 26, 1991) is a Japanese professional baseball outfielder and first baseman for the Yokohama DeNA BayStars of Nippon Professional Baseball (NPB). He has previously played in Major League Baseball (MLB) for the Tampa Bay Rays, Los Angeles Dodgers, and Pittsburgh Pirates. He was the youngest player in BayStars franchise history to reach 100, 150, and 200 home runs.

== Professional career ==
=== Yokohama BayStars/Yokohama DeNA BayStars ===
Tsutsugo made his rookie debut at age 18 for the Yokohama BayStars and played 3 games in 2010. He played 40 games in 2011, 108 games in 2012 and 23 games in 2013. His slow start were caused by injuries and lack of experience using wooden bats in professional baseball. He became a regular on the team in the 2014 season and played in 114 games. He hit 22 home runs, drove in 77 RBIs, and hit .300 with an OBP of .373. In 2015, he was selected to his first NPB All-Star Game. He hit 24 home runs, drove in 95 runs, and hit .309 with an OBP of .395.

On July 22, 2016, Tsutsugo became the first player in Nippon Professional Baseball history to have three straight multiple home run games, and in the same month he also became the first to have six multiple home run games in a month. In 2016, he was selected to his second consecutive NPB All-Star Game and was the All-Star Game MVP. He led with Central League in home runs (44) and RBIs (110). He also had career highs in batting average (.322) and OBP (.430). Tsutsugo was selected to the next three NPB All-Star Games, winning the Kantosho (敢闘選手賞) or "Fighting Spirit Award" in all three appearances. In total, Tsutsugo appeared in five NPB All-Star Games from 2015 to 2019.

In January 2019, Tsutsugo gave a speech at the Foreign correspondents club of Japan where he criticized the harsh regimentation and focus on tournaments in youth baseball in Japan. In addition he stated that he would like to play in Major League Baseball in the future. After the 2019 season, on November 15, 2019, BayStars announced it was allowing Tsutsugo to enter the posting system to play in Major League Baseball (MLB).

=== Tampa Bay Rays ===
On December 16, 2019, Tsutsugo signed a two-year, $12 million contract with the Tampa Bay Rays of Major League Baseball. On March 25, 2020, he returned to Japan due to the COVID-19 pandemic.

On July 24, 2020, Tsutsugo was the starting third baseman, making his MLB debut on Opening Day against the Toronto Blue Jays. That day, he recorded his first MLB hit, a home run off of Hyun-jin Ryu. He finished the season hitting .197/.314/.395 with 8 home runs and 24 RBIs in 51 games.

On May 11, 2021, Tsutsugo was designated for assignment by the Rays after hitting .167 in 87 plate appearances.

=== Los Angeles Dodgers ===
On May 15, 2021, Tsutsugo was traded to the Los Angeles Dodgers in exchange for cash considerations or a player to be named later. He made his Dodgers debut on May 18 as the starting left fielder against the Arizona Diamondbacks. In 12 games with the Dodgers, Tsutsugo had three hits in 25 at-bats (.120 average) before being placed on the injured list with a right calf strain. On July 7, he was passed through waivers and sent outright to the Triple-A Oklahoma City Dodgers. On August 14, the Dodgers released Tsutsugo.

=== Pittsburgh Pirates ===
On August 16, 2021, he signed a major league contract with the Pittsburgh Pirates, and played his first game with the team on the same day. On November 24, 2021, he agreed to a one-year contract with the Pirates for $4 million. On August 3, 2022, Tsutsugo was designated for assignment. He was released on August 5.

=== Toronto Blue Jays ===
On August 15, 2022, Tsutsugo signed a minor league deal with the Toronto Blue Jays organization. Tsutsugo was assigned to the Triple-A Buffalo Bisons, where he hit .265/.381/.459 with 5 home runs and 18 RBI. He elected free agency following the season on November 10.

=== Texas Rangers ===
On January 15, 2023, Tsutsugo signed a minor league contract with the Texas Rangers organization. In 51 games for the Triple–A Round Rock Express, he hit .249/.380/.432 with 6 home runs and 33 RBI. On June 22, Tsutsugo opted out his deal and became a free agent.

=== Staten Island FerryHawks ===
On August 1, 2023, Tsutsugo signed with the Staten Island FerryHawks of the Atlantic League of Professional Baseball. In 12 games for the FerryHawks, he hit .359/.479/.949 with 7 home runs and 13 RBI.

=== San Francisco Giants ===
On August 21, 2023, Tsutsugo signed a minor league contract with the San Francisco Giants organization. He hit .311 in 13 games for the Double–A Richmond Flying Squirrels and finished the year with the Triple–A Sacramento River Cats. Tsutsugo elected free agency following the season on November 6.

On December 8, 2023, Tsutsugo re–signed with the Giants on a new minor league contract. The Giants released Tsutsugo from his minor league deal on March 21, 2024.

=== Yokohama DeNA BayStars (second stint) ===
On April 16, 2024, Tsutsugo signed a contract to return to the old team Yokohama DeNA BayStars of Nippon Professional Baseball.

== International career ==
Tsutsugo played for Japan national baseball team in the 2017 World Baseball Classic. Tsutsugo was named the Pool B Most Valuable Player after batting .364.

On August 20, 2018, he was selected for the 2018 MLB Japan All-Star Series, but on October 26, 2018, he canceled his participation for Samurai Japan.

== Playing style ==
Tsutsugo was a switch hitter throughout his amateur school career until he attended Yokohama High School, where he became a left-handed hitter due to a discovery of a herniated disc during a medical examination.

== See also ==
- List of Major League Baseball players from Japan
