= Shuto Takajo =

Japanese baseball player (born 1993)

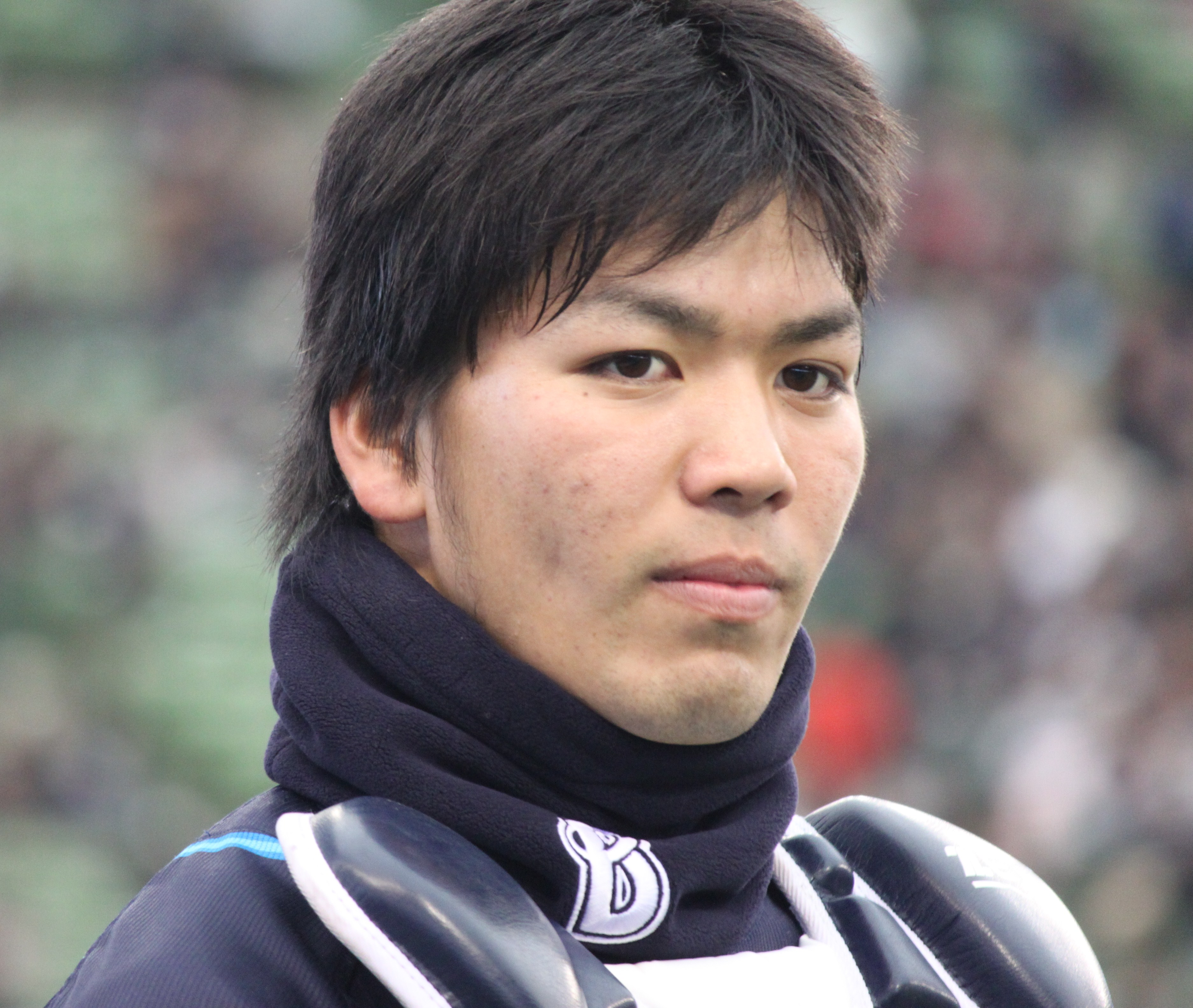
- Takajo with the Yokohama DeNA BayStars
- Catcher
- Born: May 3, 1993 (age 33); Fukuoka, Fukuoka, Japan
- Batted: Right Threw: Right

NPB debut
- July 18, 2012, for the Yokohama DeNA BayStars

Last NPB appearance
- 2021, for the Yokohama DeNA BayStars

NPB statistics
- Batting average: .172
- Home runs: 4
- RBI: 38
- Stats at Baseball Reference

Teams
- Yokohama DeNA BayStars (2012–2018); Orix Buffaloes (2018–2019); Yokohama DeNA BayStars (2020–2022)

Shuto Takajo (高城 俊人, Takajo Shuto; born May 3, 1993) is a Japanese former professional baseball catcher. He played in Nippon Professional Baseball (NPB) from 2012 to 2022 for the Yokohama DeNA BayStars and Orix Buffaloes.

== Career ==
On November 13, 2019, Takajo signed with the Yokohama DeNA BayStars of Nippon Professional Baseball. November 19, he held a press conference.
