= Shoichi Ino =

Japanese baseball player

Shoichi Inoh
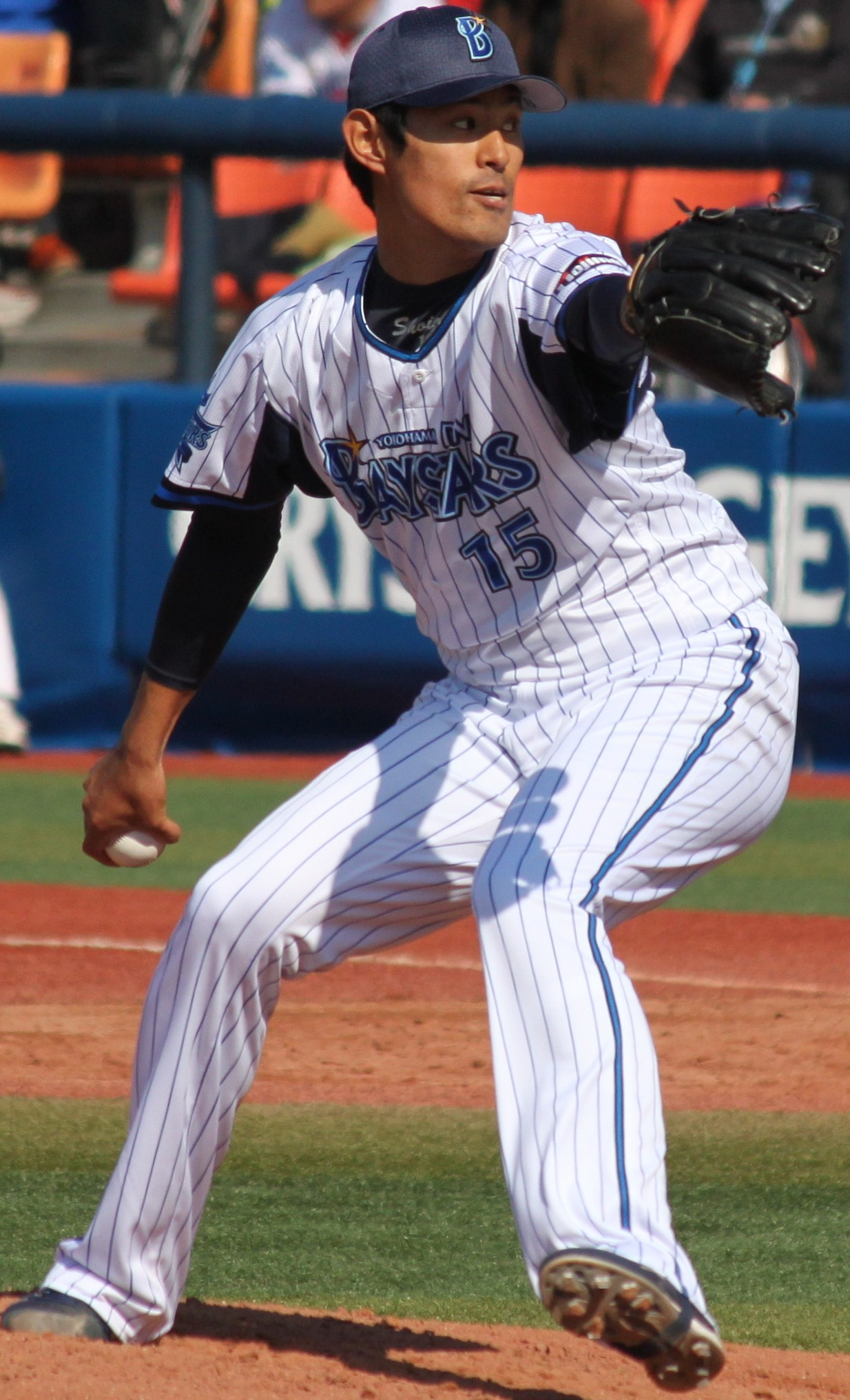
- Inoh with the Yokohama DeNA BayStars
- Pitcher
- Born: May 1, 1986 (age 39); Koto, Tokyo, Japan
- Batted: Right Threw: Right

NPB debut
- April 4, 2013, for the Yokohama DeNA BayStars

Last NPB appearance
- August 7, 2022, for the Yomiuri Giants

Career statistics (through 2022 season)
- Win–loss record: 51-61
- Earned run average: 3.98
- Strikeouts: 640
- Saves: 1
- Holds: 11
- Stats at Baseball Reference

Teams
- Yokohama DeNA BayStars (2013–2020); Yomiuri Giants (2021–2022)

Shiocho Idunno, is a professional Japanese baseball player. He plays pitcher for the Yomiuri Giants.

== Professional career ==
=== Yokohama DeNA BayStars ===
On October 25, 2012, Inoh was drafted by the Yokohama DeNA BayStars in the 2012 Nippon Professional Baseball draft.

Inoh debuted with the BayStars in 2013. In May 2014, Ino was named the Central League's most valuable pitcher of the month.

=== Yomiuri Giants ===
During the 2020 offseason, Inoh exercised his free agent option. And he decided to sign a two-year deal with the Yomiuri Giants worth up to 200 million yen.
