= Nippon Professional Baseball All-Star Series =

Annual baseball series in Japan

The Nippon Professional Baseball All-Star Series is an annual baseball series of All-Star Games between players from the Central League and the Pacific League, currently selected by a combination of fans, players, coaches, and managers. The All-Star Game usually occurs in early to mid-July and marks the symbolic halfway point in the Nippon Professional Baseball (NPB) season (though not the mathematical halfway point; in most seasons, that takes place one week earlier). Each series consists of two or three games.

== History ==
The first NPB All-Star game was played in 1951.

For many years, mimicking the gaijin waku rule of the NPB, each All-Star team was limited to two foreign players.

== Game results ==
Year	Winning league	Score	Overall record	Venue	Host team	MVP
2004	Pacific	3–1	Pacific 1-0	Nagoya Dome	Chunichi Dragons	Daisuke Matsuzaka
2004	Pacific	2–1	Pacific 2-0	Nagano Olympic Stadium	none	Tsuyoshi Shinjo
2005	Central	6–5	Pacific 2-1	Seibu Dome	Seibu Lions	Tatsuhiko Kinjo
2005	Central	5–3	Tie 2-2	Koshien Stadium	Hanshin Tigers	Tomonori Maeda
2006	Central	3–1	Central 3-2	Meiji Jingu Stadium	Yakult Swallows	Norichika Aoki
2006	Central	7–4	Central 4-2	Sun Marine Stadium	none	Atsushi Fujimoto
2007	Central	4–0	Central 5-2	Tokyo Dome	Yomiuri Giants	Alex Ramírez
2007	Central	11–5	Central 6-2	Fullcast Stadium	Rakuten Eagles	Shinnosuke Abe
2008	Pacific	5–4	Central 6-3	Kyocera Dome Osaka	Orix Buffaloes	Takeshi Yamasaki
2008	Central	11–6	Central 7-3	Yokohama Stadium	Yokohama BayStars	Masahiro Araki
2009	Central	10–8	Central 8-3	Sapporo Dome	Hokkaido Nippon-Ham Fighters	Norichika Aoki
2009	Pacific	7–4	Central 8-4	Mazda Stadium	Hiroshima Toyo Carp	Nobuhiko Matsunaka
2010	Central	4–1	Central 8-5	Yahoo Dome	Fukuoka SoftBank Hawks	Shinnosuke Abe
2010	Tie	5–5	Central 8-5-1	Hard Off Eco Stadium	none	Yasuyuki Kataoka
2011	Central	9–4	Central 9-5-1	Nagoya Dome	Chunichi Dragons	Kazuhiro Hatakeyama
2011	Pacific	4–3	Central 9-6-1	QVC Marine Field	Chiba Lotte Marines	Takeya Nakamura
2011	Pacific	5–0	Central 9-7-1	Kleenex Stadium	Rakuten Eagles	Atsunori Inaba
2012	Central	4–1	Central 10-7-1	Kyocera Dome Osaka	Orix Buffaloes	Norihiro Nakamura
2012	Central	4–0	Central 11-7-1	Botchan Stadium	none	Kenta Maeda
2012	Pacific	6–2	Central 11-8-1	Iwate Prefectural Baseball Stadium	none	Yang Dai-kang
2013	Tie	1–1	Central 11-8-2	Sapporo Dome	Hokkaido Nippon-Ham Fighters	Hirokazu Sawamura
2013	Central	3–1	Central 12-8-2	Meiji Jingu Stadium	Tokyo Yakult Swallows	Takahiro Arai
2013	Pacific	3–1	Central 12-9-2	Iwaki Green Stadium	none	Seiichi Uchikawa
2014	Central	7–0	Central 13-9-2	Seibu Dome	Saitama Seibu Lions	Brad Eldred
2014	Pacific	12–6	Central 13-10-2	Koshien Stadium	Hanshin Tigers	Yuki Yanagita
2015	Central	8–6	Central 14-10-2	Tokyo Dome	Yomiuri Giants	Shintaro Fujinami
2015	Central	8–3	Central 15-10-2	Mazda Stadium	Hiroshima Toyo Carp	Tsubasa Aizawa
2016	Central	5–4	Central 16-10-2	Yahoo Dome	Fukuoka SoftBank Hawks	Yoshitomo Tsutsugo
2016	Tie	5–5	Central 16-10-3	Yokohama Stadium	Yokohama DeNA BayStars	Shohei Ohtani
2017	Pacific	6–2	Central 16-11-3	Nagoya Dome	Chunichi Dragons	Seiichi Uchikawa
2017	Pacific	3–1	Central 16-12-3	Zozo Marine Stadium	Chiba Lotte Marines	Alfredo Despaigne
2018	Pacific	7–6	Central 16-13-3	Kyocera Dome Osaka	Orix Buffaloes	Tomoya Mori
2018	Pacific	5–1	Central 16-14-3	Fujisakidai Prefectural Baseball Stadium	none	Sōsuke Genda
2019	Pacific	6–3	Central 16-15-3	Tokyo Dome	Yomiuri Giants	Tomoya Mori
2019	Central	11–3	Central 17-15-3	Koshien Stadium	Hanshin Tigers	Kōji Chikamoto
2020	Series canceled due to the COVID-19 pandemic.					
2021	Central	5-4	Central 18-15-3	MetLife Dome	Saitama Seibu Lions	Ryosuke Kikuchi
2021	Pacific	4-3	Central 18-16-3	Rakuten Seimei Park Miyagi	Tohoku Rakuten Golden Eagles	Hiroaki Shimauchi
2022	Pacific	3-2	Central 18-17-3	Fukuoka PayPay Dome	Fukuoka SoftBank Hawks	Kotaro Kiyomiya
2022	Pacific	2-1	Tie 18-18-3	Matsuyama Central Park Baseball Stadium	none	Yuki Yanagita
2023	Pacific	8-1	Pacific 19-18-3	Nagoya Dome	Chunichi Dragons	Yuki Yanagita
2023	Pacific	6-1	Pacific 20-18-3	Mazda Stadium	Hiroshima Toyo Carp	Chusei Mannami
2024	Central	11-6	Pacific 20-19-3	Es Con Field Hokkaido	Hokkaido Nippon-Ham Fighters	Shugo Maki
2024	Pacific	16-10	Pacific 21-19-3	Meiji Jingu Stadium	Tokyo Yakult Swallows	Toshiya Satoh
2025	Pacific	5-1	Pacific 22-19-3	Kyocera Dome Osaka	Orix Buffaloes	Yuma Tongu
2025	Pacific	10-7	Pacific 23-19-3	Yokohama Stadium	Yokohama DeNA BayStars	Kotaro Kiyomiya

== Hanshin Tigers player voting controversy ==
The fan votes of the starters of the 2023 All-Star Series revealed 9 of the 10 highest voted starters were Hanshin Tigers players. It was the third time in the NPB where players from the same team led the voting in all positions. The controversy stemmed from the selection of players such as catcher Ryutaro Umeno and third baseman Teruaki Sato, whose numbers were not strong enough to warrant an All-Star Series appearance. Compared with other players at their positions, such as catcher Takumi Ohshiro and third basemen Toshiro Miyazaki and Kazuma Okamoto, Umeno and Sato’s selections appeared to be driven by popularity, rather than performance.

== See also ==
- Major League Baseball All-Star Game
- Baseball awards#Japan
