= Toshiro Miyazaki =

Japanese baseball player (born 1988)

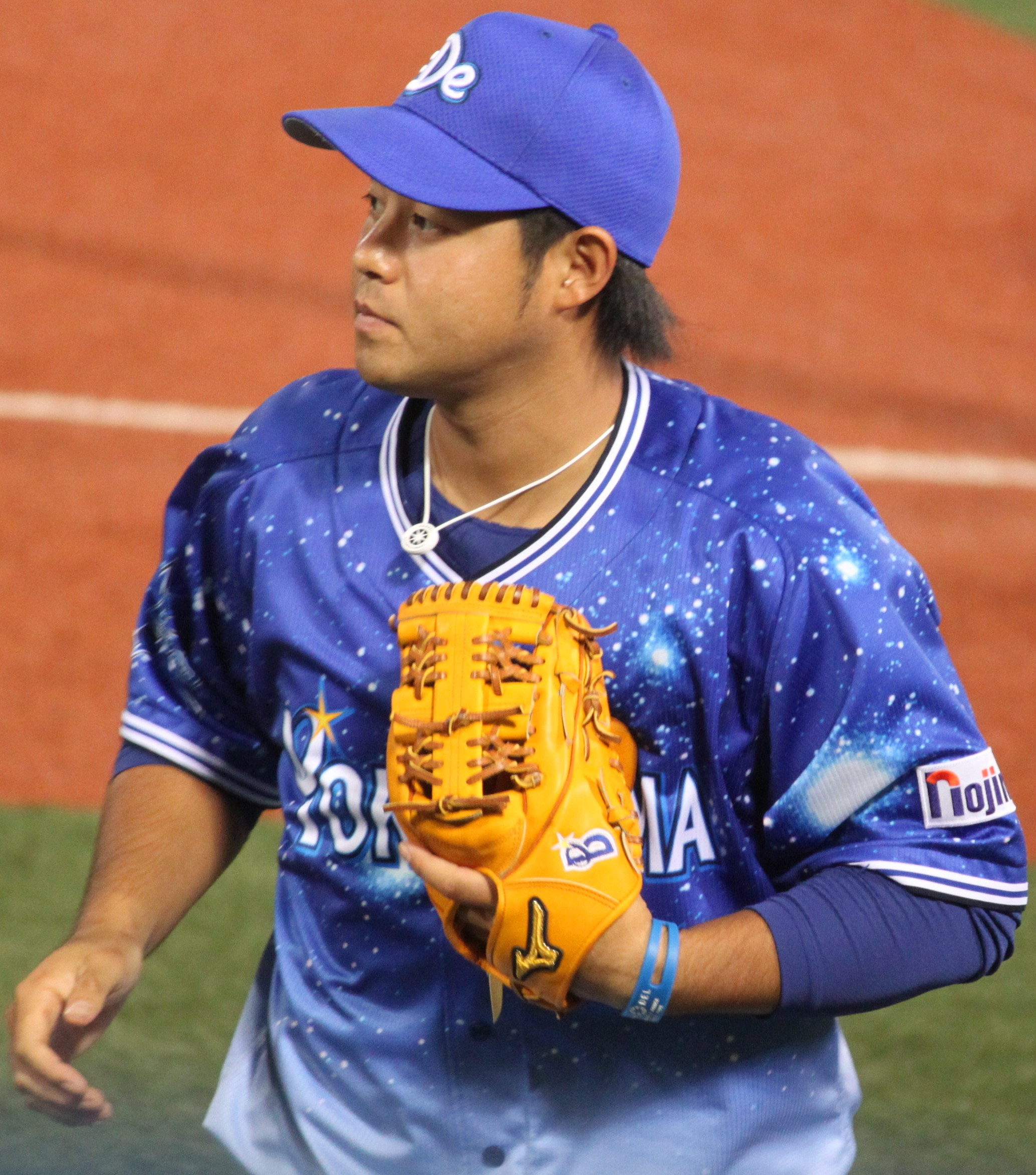
- Miyazaki with the Yokohama DeNA BayStars

Yokohama DeNA BayStars – No. 51
- Infielder
- Born: December 12, 1988 (age 37); Karatsu, Saga, Japan
- Bats: Right Throws: Right

NPB debut
- May 20, 2013, for the Yokohama DeNA BayStars

Career statistics (through 2024 season)
- Batting average: .302
- Hits: 1,264
- Home runs: 152
- Runs batted in: 536
- Stolen bases: 2
- Stats at Baseball Reference

Teams
- Yokohama DeNA BayStars (2013–present)

Career highlights and awards
- Japan Series champion (2024); 2× NPB batting champions (2017, 2023); 4× NPB All-Star (2017, 2018, 2023, 2024); 3× Best Nine Award (2017, 2018, 2023); 2× Mitsui Golden Glove Award (2018, 2023)

Toshiro Miyazaki (宮﨑 敏郎, Miyazaki Toshiro; born December 12, 1988, in Karatsu, Saga, Japan) is a Japanese professional baseball infielder for the Yokohama DeNA BayStars of Nippon Professional Baseball (NPB).

== Career ==
Miyazaki was selected to the 2018 NPB All-Star game.
