= 2017 Nippon Professional Baseball season =

2017 NPB season
- League: Nippon Professional Baseball
- Sport: Baseball
- Duration: March 31 – November 4
- Games: 143
- Teams: 12

Central League pennant
- League champions: Hiroshima Toyo Carp
- Runners-up: Hanshin Tigers
- Season MVP: Yoshihiro Maru (Hiroshima)

Pacific League pennant
- League champions: Fukuoka SoftBank Hawks
- Runners-up: Saitama Seibu Lions
- Season MVP: Dennis Sarfate (SoftBank)

Climax Series
- CL champions: Yokohama DeNA BayStars
- CL runners-up: Hiroshima Toyo Carp
- PL champions: Fukuoka SoftBank Hawks
- PL runners-up: Tohoku Rakuten Golden Eagles

Japan Series
- Venue: Fukuoka Yafuoku! Dome, Chūō-ku, Fukuoka; Yokohama Stadium, Yokohama, Kanagawa
- Champions: Fukuoka SoftBank Hawks
- Runners-up: Yokohama DeNA BayStars
- Finals MVP: Dennis Sarfate (SoftBank)

NPB seasons
- ← 2016 2018 →

The 2017 Nippon Professional Baseball season was the 68th season since the NPB was reorganized in 1950.

== Regular season standings ==
Central League regular season standings
Pos	Team	G	W	L	T	Pct.	GB	Home	Road
1	Hiroshima Toyo Carp	143	88	51	4	.633	—	50–20–1	38–31–3
2	Hanshin Tigers	143	78	61	4	.561	10.0	41–29–2	37–32–2
3	Yokohama DeNA BayStars	143	73	65	5	.529	14.5	38–29–4	35–36–1
4	Yomiuri Giants	143	72	68	3	.514	16.5	38–33–0	34–35–3
5	Chunichi Dragons	143	59	79	5	.428	28.5	37–32–3	22–47–2
6	Tokyo Yakult Swallows	143	45	96	2	.319	44.0	30–40–2	15–56–0

Pacific League regular season standings
Pos	Team	G	W	L	T	Pct.	GB	Home	Road
1	Fukuoka SoftBank Hawks	143	94	49	0	.657	—	52–20–0	42–29–0
2	Saitama Seibu Lions	143	79	61	3	.564	13.5	44–27–1	35–34–2
3	Tohoku Rakuten Golden Eagles	143	77	63	3	.550	15.5	39–30–2	38–33–1
4	Orix Buffaloes	143	63	79	1	.444	30.5	34–37–0	29–42–1
5	Hokkaido Nippon-Ham Fighters	143	60	83	0	.420	34.0	36–36–0	24–47–0
6	Chiba Lotte Marines	143	54	87	2	.383	39.0	28–42–1	26–45–1

== Climax Series ==
First stage
Central League
2	Hanshin Tigers	1
3	Yokohama DeNA BayStars	2
Pacific League
2	Saitama Seibu Lions	1
3	Tohoku Rakuten Golden Eagles	2

Final stage
1	Hiroshima Toyo Carp	2
3	Yokohama DeNA BayStars	4
1	Fukuoka SoftBank Hawks	4
3	Tohoku Rakuten Golden Eagles	2

Japan Series
CL3	Yokohama DeNA BayStars	2
PL1	Fukuoka SoftBank Hawks	4

=== First stage ===
==== Central League ====
Hanshin Tigers (1) vs. Yokohama DeNA BayStars (2)

Game	Date	Score	Location	Time	Attendance
1	October 14	Yokohama DeNA BayStars – 0, Hanshin Tigers – 2	Koshien Stadium	2:52	46,748
2	October 15	Yokohama DeNA BayStars – 13, Hanshin Tigers – 6	Koshien Stadium	4:35	46,761
3	October 17	Yokohama DeNA BayStars – 6, Hanshin Tigers – 1	Koshien Stadium	3:10	46,319

==== Pacific League ====
Saitama Seibu Lions (1) vs. Tohoku Rakuten Golden Eagles (2)

Game	Date	Score	Location	Time	Attendance
1	October 14	Tohoku Rakuten Golden Eagles – 0, Saitama Seibu Lions – 10	Seibu Prince Dome	3:00	32,547
2	October 15	Tohoku Rakuten Golden Eagles – 4, Saitama Seibu Lions – 1	Seibu Prince Dome	3:12	32,508
3	October 16	Tohoku Rakuten Golden Eagles – 5, Saitama Seibu Lions – 2	Seibu Prince Dome	3:26	31,755

=== Final stage ===
==== Central League ====
Hiroshima Toyo Carp (2) vs. Yokohama DeNA BayStars (4)

Game	Date	Score	Location	Time	Attendance
1	October 18	Yokohama DeNA BayStars – 0, Hiroshima Toyo Carp – 3 (5)	Mazda Stadium	2:13	30,810
2	October 19	Yokohama DeNA BayStars – 6, Hiroshima Toyo Carp – 2	Mazda Stadium	3:40	31,165
3	October 20	Yokohama DeNA BayStars – 1, Hiroshima Toyo Carp – 0	Mazda Stadium	3:23	31,279
4	October 23	Yokohama DeNA BayStars – 4, Hiroshima Toyo Carp – 3	Mazda Stadium	3:26	31,311
5	October 24	Yokohama DeNA BayStars – 9, Hiroshima Toyo Carp – 3	Mazda Stadium	3:39	31,230

==== Pacific League ====
Fukuoka SoftBank Hawks (4) vs. Tohoku Rakuten Golden Eagles (2)

Game	Date	Score	Location	Time	Attendance
1	October 18	Tohoku Rakuten Golden Eagles – 3, Fukuoka SoftBank Hawks – 2	Fukuoka Dome	3:05	35,125
2	October 19	Tohoku Rakuten Golden Eagles – 2, Fukuoka SoftBank Hawks – 1	Fukuoka Dome	3:31	36,380
3	October 20	Tohoku Rakuten Golden Eagles – 5, Fukuoka SoftBank Hawks – 7	Fukuoka Dome	3:16	35,333
4	October 21	Tohoku Rakuten Golden Eagles – 3, Fukuoka SoftBank Hawks – 4	Fukuoka Dome	3:21	37,455
5	October 22	Tohoku Rakuten Golden Eagles – 0, Fukuoka SoftBank Hawks – 7	Fukuoka Dome	2:41	35,387

== Japan Series ==
Yokohama DeNA BayStars (2) vs. Fukuoka SoftBank Hawks (4)

Game	Date	Score	Location	Time	Attendance
1	October 28	Yokohama DeNA BayStars – 1, Fukuoka SoftBank Hawks – 10	Fukuoka Dome	3:13	36,183
2	October 29	Yokohama DeNA BayStars – 3, Fukuoka SoftBank Hawks – 4	Fukuoka Dome	3:56	36,082
3	October 31	Fukuoka SoftBank Hawks – 3, Yokohama DeNA BayStars – 2	Yokohama Stadium	3:53	27,153
4	November 1	Fukuoka SoftBank Hawks – 0, Yokohama DeNA BayStars – 6	Yokohama Stadium	3:02	27,162
5	November 2	Fukuoka SoftBank Hawks – 4, Yokohama DeNA BayStars – 5	Yokohama Stadium	3:35	27,180
6	November 4	Yokohama DeNA BayStars – 3, Fukuoka SoftBank Hawks – 4	Fukuoka Dome	4:22	36,118

== League leaders ==
=== Central League ===
Batting leaders
Stat	Player	Team	Total
Batting average	Toshiro Miyazaki	Yokohama DeNA BayStars	.323
Home runs	Alex Guerrero	Chunichi Dragons	35
Runs batted in	José López	Yokohama DeNA BayStars	105
Runs	Yoshihiro Maru	Hiroshima Toyo Carp	109
Hits	Yoshihiro Maru; José López	Hiroshima Toyo Carp; Yokohama DeNA BayStars	171
Stolen bases	Kosuke Tanaka	Hiroshima Toyo Carp	35
On Base Percentage	Yoshihiro Maru; Kosuke Tanaka	Hiroshima Toyo Carp	.398
Slugging Percentage	Seiya Suzuki	Hiroshima Toyo Carp	.547

Pitching leaders
Stat	Player	Team	Total
Wins	Tomoyuki Sugano	Yomiuri Giants	17
Earned run average	Tomoyuki Sugano	Yomiuri Giants	1.59
Strikeouts	Miles Mikolas	Yomiuri Giants	187
Innings pitched	Miles Mikolas	Yomiuri Giants	188
Saves	Rafael Dolis	Hanshin Tigers	37
Holds	Kentaro Kuwahara	Hanshin Tigers	39
Winning percentage	Daichi Ohsera	Hiroshima Toyo Carp	.833

=== Pacific League ===
Batting leaders
Stat	Player	Team	Total
Batting average	Shogo Akiyama	Saitama Seibu Lions	.322
Home runs	Alfredo Despaigne	Fukuoka SoftBank Hawks	35
Runs batted in	Alfredo Despaigne	Fukuoka SoftBank Hawks	103
Runs	Shogo Akiyama	Saitama Seibu Lions	106
Hits	Shogo Akiyama	Saitama Seibu Lions	185
Stolen bases	Haruki Nishikawa	Hokkaido Nippon-Ham Fighters	39
On Base Percentage	Yuki Yanagita	Fukuoka SoftBank Hawks	.426
Slugging Percentage	Yuki Yanagita	Fukuoka SoftBank Hawks	.589

Pitching leaders
Stat	Player	Team	Total
Wins	Nao Higashihama	Fukuoka SoftBank Hawks	16
Earned run average	Yusei Kikuchi	Saitama Seibu Lions	1.97
Strikeouts	Takahiro Norimoto	Tohoku Rakuten Golden Eagles	222
Innings pitched	Yusei Kikuchi	Saitama Seibu Lions	187.2
Saves	Dennis Sarfate	Fukuoka SoftBank Hawks	54
Holds	Sho Iwasaki	Fukuoka SoftBank Hawks	40
Winning percentage	Kodai Senga	Fukuoka SoftBank Hawks	.765

== Attendances ==
#	Team	Average
1	Hanshin Tigers	42,148
2	Yomiuri Giants	41,675
3	Fukuoka SoftBank Hawks	35,094
4	Hiroshima Toyo Carp	30,670
5	Hokkaido Nippon-Ham Fighters	28,978
6	Yokohama DeNA BayStars	27,880
7	Chunichi Dragons	27,927
8	Tokyo Yakult Swallows	25,871
9	Tohoku Rakuten Golden Eagles	24,931
10	Saitama Seibu Lions	23,239
11	ORIX Buffaloes	22,658
12	Chiba Lotte Marines	20,425

== See also ==
- 2017 KBO League season
- 2017 Major League Baseball season
