= 2012 Nippon Professional Baseball draft =

2012 Nippon Professional Baseball Draft
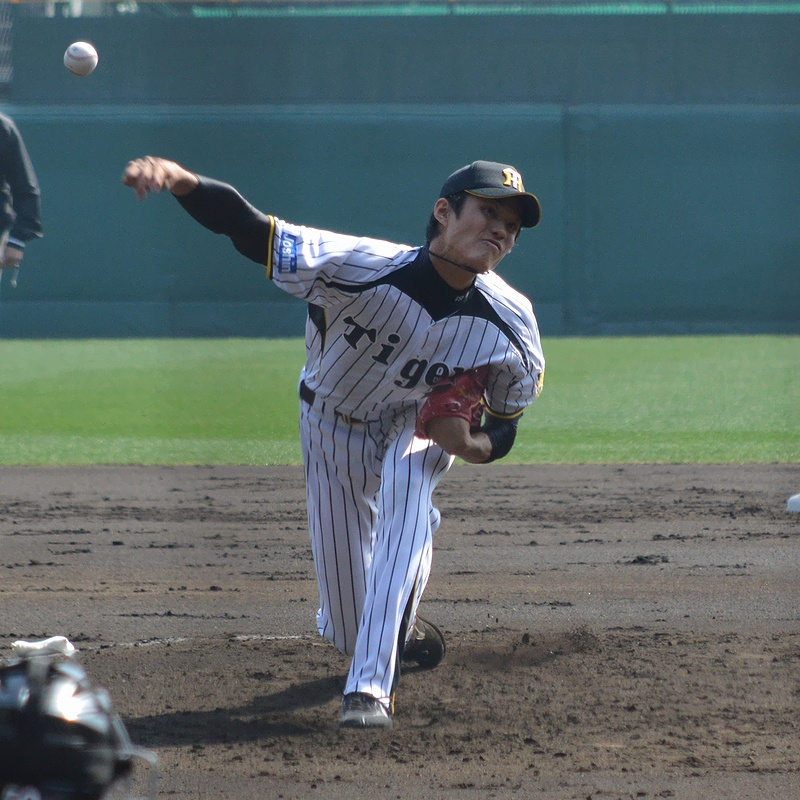
- Shintaro Fujinami, who was nominated and bid lottery for by four teams.

General information
- Sport: Baseball
- Date: October 25, 2012
- Location: Grand Prince Hotel Takanawa, Tokyo
- Networks: TBS (first round), sky-A
- Sponsored by: Toshiba

Overview
- 83 total selections in 10 (Includes draft for developmental players) rounds
- League: Nippon Professional Baseball
- First round selections: Shintaro Fujinami; Nao Higashihama; Yudai Mori

The 2012 Nippon Professional Baseball (NPB) Draft was held on October 25, 2012, for the 48th time at the Grand Prince Hotel Takanawa to assign amateur baseball players to the NPB. It was arranged with the special cooperation of Toshiba with official naming rights. The draft was officially called "The Professional Baseball Draft Meeting supported by Reed. It has been sponsored by Toshiba for the 4th consecutive year since 2009.

== Summary ==
Only the first round picks will be done by bid lottery. After the second round, waver selections were made in order from the lowest-ranked team of the 2012 season in both the Central League and Pacific League, the third round was reversed and selections were made from the top team, and the fourth round was reversed again, alternating with selections from the lowest-ranked team until all teams had finished selecting players.

Since the 2005 season, the winner of the NPB All-Star Game has determined whether the Central League or the Pacific League gets waiver preference after the second round. In the 2012 All-Star Game, the Central League won two games, so the Central League was given waiver priority over the Central League.

This draft was notable for featuring Shohei Ohtani, who would go on to be the most accomplished Japanese player in baseball history. Four days before the NPB draft, Ohtani, a highly acclaimed prospect, announced that he planned to be the first Japanese player to go directly from high school to Major League Baseball in the United States. That led most NPB teams to avoid drafting him, fearing a wasted pick. Only the Hokkaido Nippon-Ham Fighters decided to use its first-round pick to draft Ohtani, hoping he would decide to start his career in Japan. The Fighters prepared a video presentation titled "The Path to Realizing Shohei Ohtani's Dream" that outlined the difficult life of minor leaguers playing rookie ball in the United States. Meanwhile, Ohtani's preferred MLB team, the Los Angeles Dodgers, didn't want him to continue both pitching and hitting. After negotiations, Ohtani announced he would indeed sign with the Fighters.

== First Round Contested Picks ==
	Player name	Position	Teams selected by
First Round	**Shintaro Fujinami**	Pitcher	Buffaloes, **Tigers**, Marines, Swallows
First Round	**Nao Higashihama**	Pitcher	Baystars, **Hawks**, Lions
First Round	**Yudai Mori**	Pitcher	Carp, **Eagles**
Second Round	**Takahiro Matsunaga**	Pitcher	Buffaloes, **Marines**
Second Round	**Tatsushi Masuda**	Pitcher	Carp, **Lions**

- **Bolded** teams indicate who won the right to negotiate contract following a lottery.
- In the first round, **Koji Fukutani** (Pitcher) was selected by **Dragons**, **Tomoyuki Sugano** (Pitcher) was selected by **Giants** and **Shohei Ohtani** (Pitcher) by **Fighters** without a bid lottery.
- In the second round, **Hiroyuki Shirasaki** (Infielder) was selected by **Baystars** and **Taichi Ishiyama** (Pitcher) by **Swallows** without a bid lottery.
- In the third round, **Takahiro Matsuba** (Pitcher) was selected by **Buffaloes** and **Hiroki Takahashi** (Outfielder) by **Carp** without a bid lottery.
- List of selected players.

== Selected Players ==
Key
*	Player did not sign

- The order of the teams is the order of second round waiver priority.
- **Bolded** After that, a developmental player who contracted as a registered player under control.
- List of selected players.

=== Yokohama DeNA Baystars ===
Pick	Player name	Position	Team
#1	Hiroyuki Shirasaki	Infielder	Komazawa University
#2	Kazuki Mishima	Pitcher	Hosei University
#3	Shoichi Ino	Pitcher	NTT East Japan
#4	Daichi Akahori	Outfielder	Sega Sammy
#5	Tateki Abe	Pitcher	NTT West Japan
#6	Toshiro Miyazaki	Infielder	Sega Sammy
Developmental Player Draft
#1	Kinta Imai	Pitcher	Hiroshima International Academy High School

=== Orix Buffaloes ===
Pick	Player name	Position	Team
#1	Takahiro Matsuba	Pitcher	Osaka University of Health and Sport Sciences
#2	Shunichi Sato	Pitcher	Seisa Dohto University
#3	Torai Fushimi	Catcher	Tokai University
#4	Kengo Takeda	Outfielder	Jiyugaoka High School
#5	Shota Morimoto	Pitcher	Fukui Miracle Elephants
#6	Ryo Toda	Pitcher	JR-East
Developmental Player Draft
#1	Daiiki Hara	Catcher	Shinano Grandserows
#2	**Hiroki Nishikawa**	Outfielder	Fukui Miracle Elephants

=== Hanshin Tigers ===
Pick	Player name	Position	Team
#1	Shintaro Fujinami	Pitcher	Osaka Toin High School
#2	Fumiya Hojo	Infielder	Kosei Gakuin High School
#3	Kojiro Tanabo	Pitcher	JFE East
#4	Shinya Azuhata	Catcher	Seino Transportation
#5	Kazuyuki Kaneda	Pitcher	Osaka Gakuin University
#6	Ryosuke Ogata	Outfielder	Toyo University

=== Chiba Lotte Marines ===
Pick	Player name	Position	Team
#1	Takahiro Matsunaga	Pitcher	Osaka Gas
#2	Hiroya Kawamitsu	Pitcher	Kyushu Kyoritsu University
#3	Tatsuhiro Tamura	Catcher	Kosei Gakuin High School
#4	Shohei Katoh	Outfielder	Jobu University

=== Hiroshima Toyo Carp ===
Pick	Player name	Position	Team
#1	Hiroki Takahashi	Outfielder	Ryukoku University Heian High School
#2	Seiya Suzuki	Infielder	Nishogakusha University High School
#3	Takashi Uemoto	Infielder	Meiji University
#4	Ko Shimozuru	Outfielder	Honda
#5	Yuki Mima	Infielder	Naruto Uzushio High School
Developmental Player Draft
#1	**Sora Thuji**	Pitcher	Gifu Johoku High School
#2	Tsukasa Morishita	Outfielder	Aichi Institute of Technology

=== Tohoku Rakuten Golden Eagles ===
Pick	Player name	Position	Team
#1	Yudai Mori	Pitcher	Higashi Fukuoka High School
#2	Takahiro Norimoto	Pitcher	Mie Chukyo University
#3	Takahito Otsuka	Pitcher	Kyushu Gakuin High School
#4	Takahiro Shimotsuma	Catcher	Sakata Minami High School
#5	Hirohito Shimai	Outfielder	Kumamoto Golden Larks
#6	Takahiro Kakizawa	Pitcher	Kamimura Gakuen High School
Developmental Player Draft
#1	**Sho Miyagawa**	Pitcher	Osaka University of Health and Sport Sciences

=== Tokyo Yakult Swallows ===
Pick	Player name	Position	Team
#1	Taichi Ishiyama	Pitcher	Yamaha Corporation
#2	Yasuhiro Ogawa	Pitcher	Soka University
#3	Kengo Tagawa	Pitcher	Kochi Chuou High School
#4	Masaya Emura	Pitcher	Y-Tec
#5	Yudai Hoshino	Catcher	Kagawa Olive Guyners
#6	Ryota Yachi	Infielder	Kokugakuin University
#7	Tatsuya Oba	Pitcher	Hitachi

=== Fukuoka SoftBank Hawks ===
Pick	Player name	Position	Team
#1	Nao Higashihama	Pitcher	Asia University
#2	Yusuke Itoh	Pitcher	Tohoku Gakuin University
#3	Tomoki Takata	Infielder	Asia University
#4	Yusuke Masago	Outfielder	Nishi Joyo High School
#5	Taiga Kasahara	Pitcher	Fukuoka Institute of Technology Joto High School
#6	Hirofumi Yamanaka	Pitcher	Honda Kumamoto
Developmental Player Draft
#1	Takeshi Yagi	Catcher	Gunma Diamond Pegasus
#2	Yusuke Ohtaki	Outfielder	Chikkyu Kankyo High School
#3	**Yuya Iida**	Pitcher	Tokyo University of Agriculture Hokkaido Okhotsk
#4	Hayao Miyazaki	Outfielder	Mie Chukyo University

=== Chunichi Dragons ===
Pick	Player name	Position	Team
#1	Koji Fukutani	Pitcher	Keio University
#2	Tatsuro Hamada	Pitcher	Aichi Institute of Technology Meiden High School
#3	Takeru Furumoto	Outfielder	Ryukoku University
#4	Shota Sugiyama	Catcher	Waseda University
#5	Hayato Mizowaki	Pitcher	Kyushu Gakuin High School
#6	koushi Inoue	Pitcher	City Light Okayama
#7	Shunta Wakamatsu	Pitcher	Yuusei High School

=== Saitama Seibu Lions ===
Pick	Player name	Position	Team
#1	Tatsushi Masuda	Pitcher	NTT West Japan
#2	Makoto Aiuchi	Pitcher	Chiba International High School
#3	Yuji Kaneko	Infielder	Ritsumeikan University
#4	Tomomi Takahashi	Pitcher	Seino Transportation
#5	Isamu Sato	Pitcher	Konan High School
Developmental Player Draft
#1	**Daichi Mizuguchi**	Infielder	Kagawa Olive Guyners

=== Yomiuri Giants ===
Pick	Player name	Position	Team
#1	Tomoyuki Sugano	Pitcher	Tokai University
#2	Susumu Ohrui	Infielder	Seisa Dohto University
#3	Harutomo Tsuji	Infielder	Komono High School
#4	Katsuhiko Kumon	Pitcher	Osaka Gas
#5	Masaki Sakaguchi	Infielder	Tokai University
Developmental Player Draft
#1	Keigo Tahara	Outfielder	Yokohama High School
#2	Rin Matsutomi	Pitcher	Beppu University

=== Hokkaido Nippon-Ham Fighters ===
Pick	Player name	Position	Team
#1	Shohei Ohtani	Pitcher	Hanamaki Higashi High School
#2	Tatsuya Morimoto	Infielder	Takaoka Daiichi High School
#3	Yohei Kagiya	Pitcher	Chuo University
#4	Ruita Usami	Infielder	Hiroshima Technical High School
#5	Hayato Arakaki	Pitcher	Toshiba
#6	Shogo Yagi	Pitcher	JX-Eneos
#7	Hidekazu Kawano	Pitcher	Nippon Steel Hirohata

Preceded by 2011	Nippon Professional Baseball draft	Succeeded by 2013
