= Hayato Mizowaki =

Japanese baseball player (born 1994)

Hayato Mizowaki 溝脇 隼人
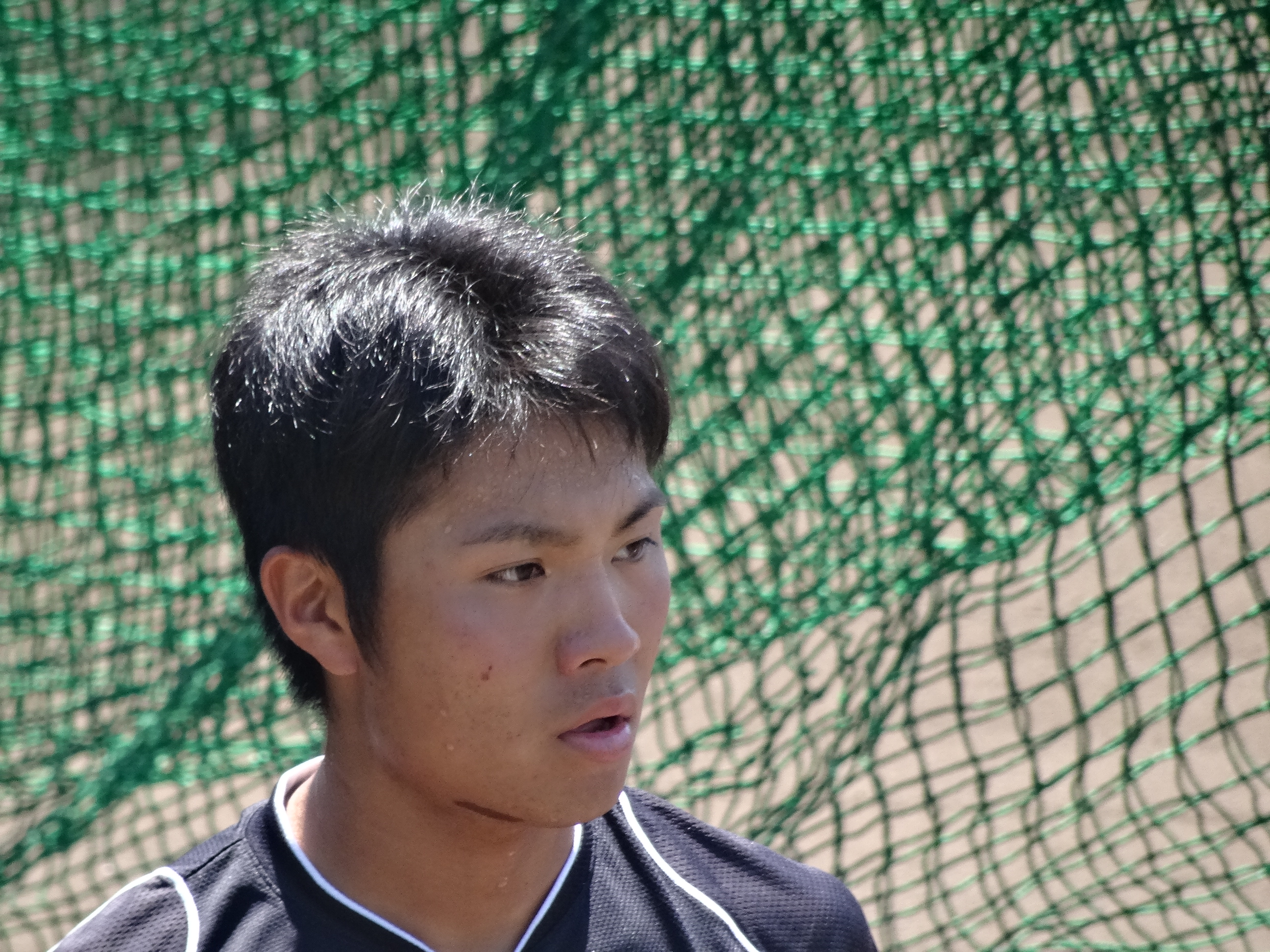

Chunichi Dragons – No. 48
- Infielder
- Born: 17 May 1994 (age 32); Tamana, Kumamoto, Japan
- Bats: Left Throws: Right

NPB debut
- 6 August, 2014, for the Chunichi Dragons

NPB statistics (through 2020 season)
- Batting average: .179
- Home runs: 1
- Runs batted in: 4
- Stats at Baseball Reference

Teams
- Chunichi Dragons (2013–present)

Hayato Mizowaki (溝脇 隼人, Mizowaki Hayato; born May 17, 1994) is a Japanese professional baseball infielder for the Chunichi Dragons in Japan's Nippon Professional Baseball.

== Early career ==
Mizowaki attended Tamana Municipal Junior High School where he started playing baseball.

From his freshman year at Kyushu Gakuin High School, Mizowaki became a regular at short stop. In summer of his freshman year, he batted second, fielding at short in the 92nd Japanese High School Baseball Championship. In the third game, he experienced pneumonia, but was put on an intravenous drip and played the game. He reached the best 8 of the tournament with his school where they lost 3–10 to Tokai University Sagami High School.

In spring of his junior year at the 83rd Japanese High School Baseball Invitational Tournament, batting first and fielding at short-stop, he hit a game changing triple in the 9th inning with two outs against Kokugakuin University High School where the subsequent line-up scored lead the team to victory. In the 2nd game against Riseisha High School, Mizowaki came down with gastroenteritis where he once again had an IV drip before playing. This time however his team would lose 2-8 where he was the last batter. In summer during the Kumamoto qualifiers his team was bundled out by Kumamoto Technical High School 0–3 in the semi-finals.

In spring of his senior year at the 84th High School Baseball Invitational Tournament, Mizowaki once again lead-off fielding at short stop. In the second game, his team lost 3–5 to eventual winners Osaka Tōin High School led by ace, Shintaro Fujinami. In summer his team would once again fail to reach the summer koshien tournament losing out to Seiseiko High School 0–1 in the semi-final.

On 25 October 2012, Mizowaki was selected as the 5th draft pick for the Chunichi Dragons at the 2012 NPB draft and on 19 November signed a provisional contract with a ¥27,000,000 sign-on bonus and a ¥6,000,000 yearly salary.

== Professional career ==
=== Chunichi Dragons ===
On 26 August 2014, Mizowaki made his professional debut against the Yokohama DeNA Baystars fielding at short stop at batting 8th in the order. His first professional hit came of Yuya Kubo in his 3rd plate appearance.

On 4 April 2017, Mizowaki hit his first professional homerun against Hiroshima Carp pitcher Yusuke Nomura as a pinch-hitter for Shunta Wakamatsu at Nagoya Dome.

== Playing style ==
Mizowaki can run 50 metres in 6 seconds with his glove being his main strength. He is also known as a contact hitter.

== Personal ==
The player Mizowaki looks up to the most is Masahiro Araki with whom he shares the same home prefecture.
