= Tatsurō =

- Gender: Male

Origin
- Origin: Japanese
- Meaning: Different meanings depending on the kanji used

Tatsurō, Tatsuro or Tatsurou (written: 達郎, 達朗, 竜郎, 龍朗 or 逹瑯) is a masculine Japanese given name. Notable people with the name include:

- Tatsuro (逹瑯; born 1979), Japanese singer
- Tatsuro Hagihara (萩原 達郎; born 1982), Japanese football player
- Tatsurō Hamada (濱田 達郎; born 1994), Japanese baseball player
- Hamanishiki Tatsurō (濵錦 竜郎; born 1976), Japanese sumo wrestler
- Tatsuro Hirooka (広岡 達朗; born 1932), Japanese baseball player
- Tatsuro Inui (乾 達朗; born 1990), Japanese football player
- Tatsuro Iwasaki (岩崎 達郎; born 1984), Japanese baseball player
- Tatsuro Okuda (奥田 達朗; born 1988), Japanese football player
- Tatsuro Taira (平良 達郎; born 2000), Japanese mixed martial artist
- Tatsuro Toyoda (豊田 達郎; 1930–2017), Japanese businessman
- Tatsuro Yamashita (山下 達郎; born 1953), Japanese singer-songwriter and record producer
- Tatsuro Yamauchi (山内 達朗; born), Japanese football player
- Tatsuro Yoshino (吉野 達郎; born 1982), Japanese sprinter
