= Shirasaki =

Shirasaki (written: 白崎 lit. "white cape") is a Japanese surname. Notable people with the surname include:

- Ayako Shirasaki (白崎 彩子, 1969–2021), Japanese jazz musician
- Hiroyuki Shirasaki (白崎 浩之, born 1990), Japanese baseball player
- Ryōhei Shirasaki (白崎 凌兵, born 1993), Japanese footballer

Fictional characters:

- Tsugumi Shirasaki (白崎 つぐみ), a character in the visual novel Daitoshokan no Hitsujikai

== See also ==
- 12326 Shirasaki, a main-belt minor planet
