= Yasuhiro Ogawa =

Japanese baseball player (born 1990)

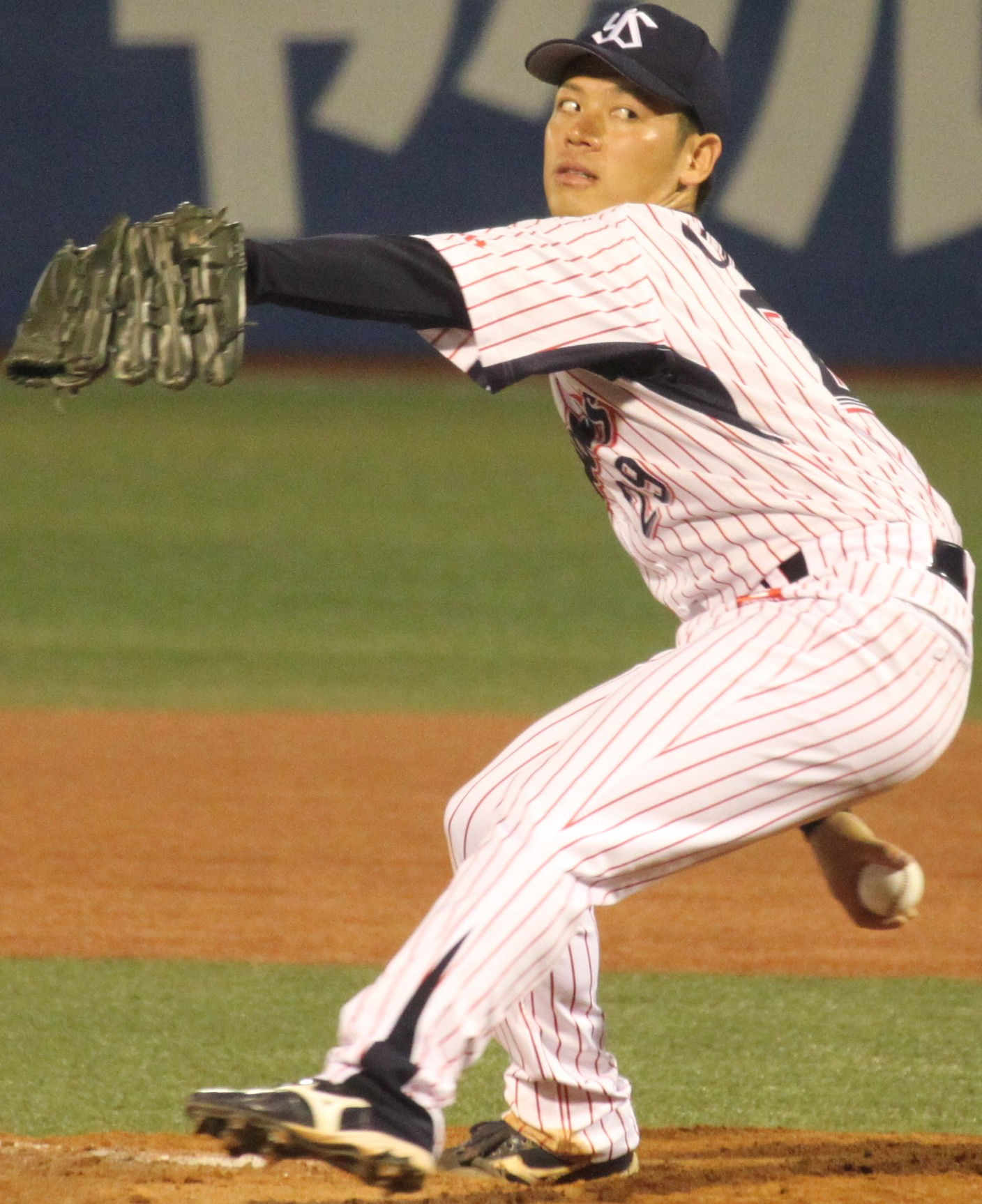
- Ogawa with the Tokyo Yakult Swallows

Tokyo Yakult Swallows – No. 29
- Pitcher
- Born: May 16, 1990 (age 36); Tahara, Aichi, Japan
- Bats: Right Throws: Right

NPB debut
- April 3, 2013, for the Tokyo Yakult Swallows

Career statistics (through 2024 season)
- Win–loss record: 104-86
- Earned run average: 3.61
- Strikeouts: 1,217
- Stats at Baseball Reference

Teams
- Tokyo Yakult Swallows (2013–present)

Career highlights and awards
- 2013 Central League Rookie of the Year; 1× NPB Win Champion (2013); 2× NPB All-Star (2013, 2017); Pitched a no-hitter on August 15, 2020; 1× Japan Series champion (2021)
Medals
Men's baseball
Representing Japan
2015 WBSC Premier12
Bronze medal – third place	2015 Tokyo	Team

Yasuhiro Ogawa (小川 泰弘, Ogawa Yasuhiro; born May 16, 1990 in Tahara, Aichi, Japan) is a professional Japanese baseball player. He is a pitcher for the Tokyo Yakult Swallows.

== Early baseball career ==
Born in Aichi Prefecture, he is the youngest of 5 siblings. He started playing baseball in third grade. He joined the Akabane Junior High School's baseball club, and under his lead as the team's ace, he brought the team to the prefectural tournament.

He entered Seisho High School, and played in a Japan-US friendly match during his 2nd year, along with Taishi Nakagawa and Koji Fukutani. In his junior year, his team defeated Iwamizawa High School and advanced to the 2nd round of the 80th Japanese High School Baseball Invitational Tournament.

Upon entering Soka University, he participated in the finals of the New Tokyo University Baseball League as a substitute to the team's ace who injured his left elbow, and beat soon-to-be Giants pitcher Tomoyuki Sugano of Tokai University. In his sophomore year, he became the team's ace pitcher. He came upon Nolan Ryan's Pitcher's Bible, and he will be quoted later on that reading the book prompted him to change his pitching form.

He showed further promise when he established a new league ERA record of 0.12 in his 3rd year, and became the 8th pitcher in league history to achieve a no-hit no-run in his senior year. Ever since he developed his new pitching form, he went on a 21-game winning streak without injuries. He racked up a total of 36 wins and 3 losses throughout his university career, an overall ERA of 0.60, and five League MVP awards.

== Tokyo Yakult Swallows ==
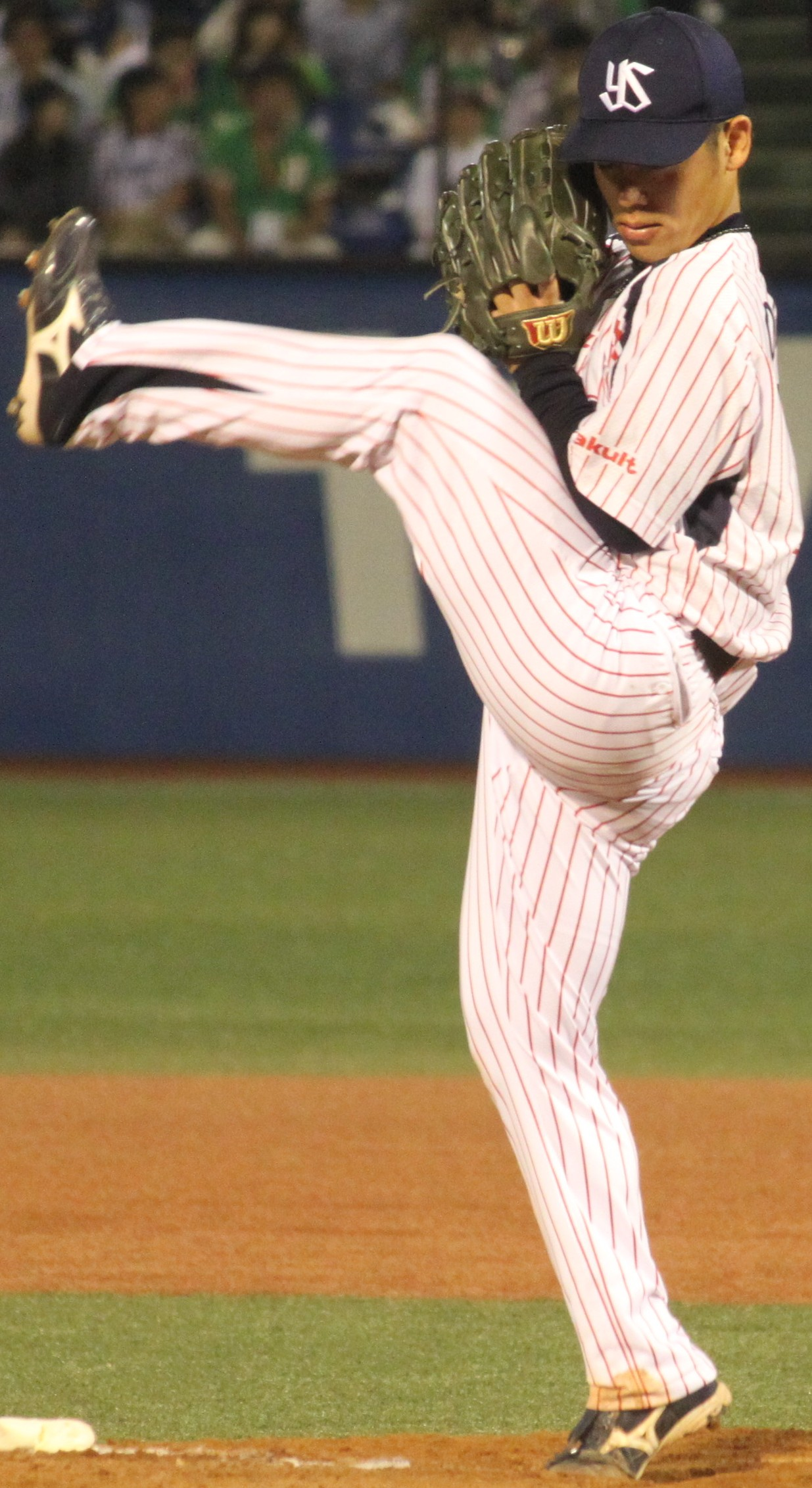
Ogawa's unique pitching form（Meiji Jingu, 2013）

He was the Swallow's 2nd pick in the 2012 NPB draft, next to Taichi Ishiyama (industrial league). On November 28, he signed a contract with the Swallows for an annual salary of 12 million yen, with an additional signing bonus of 70 million. He was assigned the jersey number 29.

2013

He pitched 6.2 scoreless innings in his first official match on April 3, and secured his first victory when the Swallows beat the Carps by 4 runs, the first among his fellow rookie pitchers to do so. It was also his mother's birthday on that day. His second win came a week later, when he pitched 7 innings against the Chunichi Dragons without surrendering any runs, and gave up only a single hit to Hector Luna.

By mid-season, he pitched his first shutout win, and became the first rookie in franchise history to record his seventh victory before the end of June. He again tossed another shutout a few days later. His pitching prowess showed no signs of stopping when he became the 2nd Swallows pitcher, and the 8th rookie pitcher in NPB history to record a win during the All-Star Series. He then went on a 7-game winning streak (the first Swallows rookie to do so), and his win tally already reached 12 by early August.

Even though the Swallows finished last, Ogawa gave the fans a reason to celebrate in an otherwise disappointing season. He led the Central League in wins, going 16–4 with a 2.93 ERA in 26 appearances, and received the 2013 Rookie of the Year award.

By December, he continued to set team records when the Swallows gave him a 44 million yen raise, bringing his 2014 salary to 56 million yen. This was the highest salary for a Yakult player after their first year, surpassing Ryo Kawashima's 42 million in 2004.

2014

He started the year by earning the Swallows' their first victory in the March 28 opening day match against the BayStars. On April 11, despite being charged with a balk while attempting a pickoff to third, he held the BayStars to runs and earned his 3rd consecutive win. With this, he became the first Swallows pitcher in 44 years to win 3 consecutive starts to begin a season, since Hiromu Matsuoka in 1970.

Unfortunately, his winning streak came to a halt when a batted ball struck his right hand during a game against Hanshin on the April 18, where he also gave up 4 runs. He was diagnosed with a fracture in his right hamate hook bone and was taken off the active roster 2 days later. He underwent rehabilitation for 2 months and returned on July 12, but he surrendered 5 runs to the Baystars and once again earned the loss. He managed to get his game back on his next outing however, when held the Carps scoreless for 7 innings.

== Playing style ==
His unusual pitching form, most notably his leg kick, earned him the nickname "Ryan" for it was fashioned after the style MLB Hall of Famer Nolan Ryan. Listed at 171 cm (5 ft 7 in), he may lack the advantage of having longer limbs for extra power, but his form has a slower rhythm to it, making his pitches more difficult to time. With an overhand delivery, he throws a four-seam fastball typically at high-80s mph (tops out at 150 km/h or 93 mph). He can throw decent two-seamers and cutters, sliders, and forkballs.

== Personal info ==
Ogawa enjoys reading at cafes on his day off. He likes Italian food and wine. In 2014, he admitted to eating ice cream at least three times a week. He skipped on his favorite dessert and fried foods during the off-season and dropped his weight from 80 to 78 kilograms. He also lowered his fat percentage by two points to sixteen percent.
