= Wakamatsu =

Wakamatsu (Japanese: 若松) may refer to:

== Places in Japan ==
- Wakamatsu Island, one of the Gotō Islands
- Aizuwakamatsu, a city in Fukushima Prefecture
- Wakamatsu-ku, Kitakyūshū, a ward of Kitakyūshū in Fukuoka Prefecture
- Wakamatsu Station, a railway station in Wakamatsu-ku, Kitakyūshū

== Other uses ==
- Wakamatsu (surname)
