= Wakamatsu (surname) =

Wakamatsu (Japanese: 若松) is a Japanese surname. Notable people with the surname include:

- Daiki Wakamatsu (若松 大樹; born 1976), Japanese former football player
- Don Wakamatsu (born 1963), American former professional baseball player and manager
- Kaneshige Wakamatsu (若松 謙維; born 1955), Japanese politician and accountant
- Kōji Wakamatsu (若松 孝二; 1936–2012), Japanese film director
- Setsurō Wakamatsu (若松 節朗; born 1949), Japanese film director
- Shizuko Wakamatsu (若松 賤子; 1864–1896), Japanese writer and translator
- Shunta Wakamatsu (若松 駿太; born 1995), Japanese baseball player
- Tadaichi Wakamatsu (若松 只一; 1893–1959), Japanese general during World War II
- Toshihide Wakamatsu (若松 俊秀; born 1965), Japanese actor
- Takehiko Wakamatsu (若松 武彦; born 1969), Japanese sumo coach and former sumo wrestler
- Tsutomu Wakamatsu (若松 勉; born 1947), Japanese former baseball player, coach, manager
- Utako Wakamatsu (若松 詩子; born 1981), Japanese former competitive figure skater
- Rei Wakamatsu (若松 怜; born 2006), Japanese motorcycle racer
