= Tomoki Takata =

Japanese baseball player (born 1990)

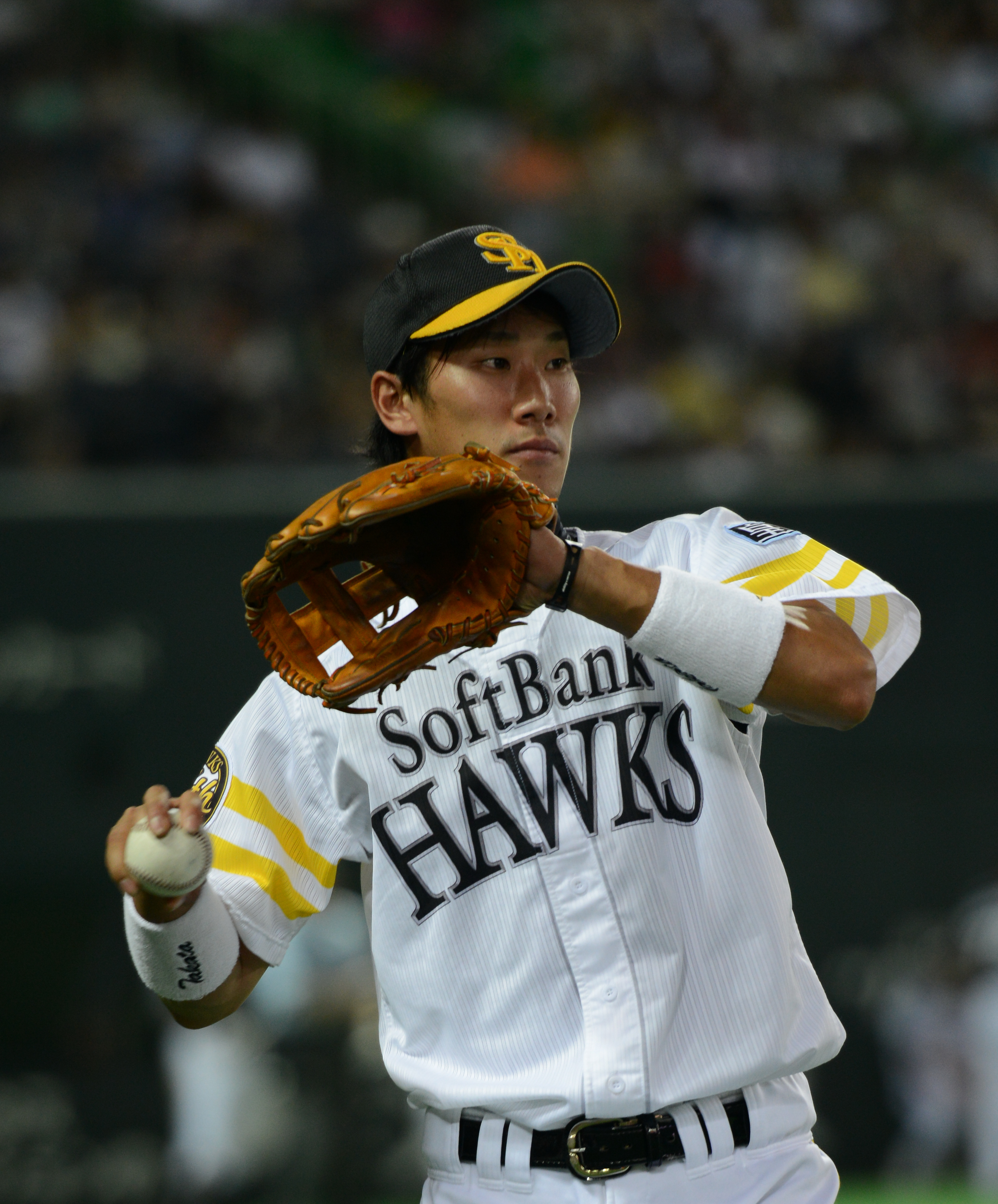
- Takata with the Fukuoka SoftBank Hawks

Fukuoka SoftBank Hawks – No. 82
- Second baseman / Coach
- Born: May 6, 1990 (age 36); Himeji, Hyōgo, Japan
- Batted: Left Threw: Right

NPB debut
- 2013, for the Fukuoka SoftBank Hawks

Last NPB appearance
- September 2, 2022, for the Fukuoka SoftBank Hawks

NPB statistics
- Batting average: .201
- Home runs: 5
- Run batted in: 53
- Stats at Baseball Reference

Teams
- As player: Fukuoka SoftBank Hawks (2013–2022); As coach: Fukuoka SoftBank Hawks (2023–present)

Career highlights and awards
- As player: 6× Japan Series champion (2014–2015, 2017–2020); As coach: Japan Series champion (2025)

Tomoki Takata (高田 知季, born May 6, 1990) is a Japanese former professional baseball second baseman, and current second squad infield defense and base running coach for the Fukuoka SoftBank Hawks of Nippon Professional Baseball (NPB). He played in NPB for the Hawks from 2013 to 2022.

== Professional career ==
On October 25, 2012, Takata was drafted by the Fukuoka SoftBank Hawks in the 2012 Nippon Professional Baseball draft.

=== 2013–2015 season ===
On March 25, 2013, Takata debuted in the Pacific League against the Saitama Seibu Lions, and he recorded his first hit on August 6. In the 2013 season, he played in 11 games in the Pacific League.

On August 28, 2014, Takata recorded his first RBI hit. In the 2014 season, he played in 12 games in the Pacific League. In the 2014 Japan Series against the Hanshin Tigers, he was selected for the Japan Series roster

On April 23, 2015, Takada recorded multi hits at a three hits. He recorded his first home run against the Yomiuri Giants in the interleague play on June 7. In the 2015 season, he finished the regular season in 81 games with a batting average of .237, one home run, an RBI of 11, and 4 stolen bases. In the 2015 Japan Series against the Tokyo Yakult Swallows, he played in the Japan Series for the first time as a pinch runner in Game 5.

=== 2016–2020 season ===
On September 29, 2016, Takada underwent shoulder surgery. In the 2016 season, he had only played 36 games due to surgery.

In the 2017 season, Takada's return to the team was postponed until June 13 due to rehabilitation. On July 18, he was interviewed with a home run and an RBI hit. He finished the regular season in 58 games with a batting average of .228, two home runs, am RBI of 8, and 2 stolen bases. In the 2017 Japan Series against the Yokohama DeNA BayStars, he was selected for the Japan Series roster.

Takata hit a two-run home run in a come-from-behind match against the Orix Buffaloes on May 4, 2018. In the 2018 season, he finished the regular season in 74 games with a batting average of .188, two home runs, an RBI of 15, and 2 stolen bases. In the 2018 Pacific League Climax Series against the Hokkaido Nippon-Ham Fighters, he made an error, but hitting an RBI hit in Game 2. In the 2018 Japan Series against the Hiroshima Toyo Carp, he recorded his first hit in the Japan Series.

On June 8, 2019, Takada recorded multi hits at a three hits, against the Hiroshima Toyo Carp in the Interleague play. He recorded a squeeze bunt against Saitama Seibu Lions on September 12. He finished the regular season in 93 games with a batting average of .157, an RBI of 10, and 2 stolen bases. In the 2019 Japan Series against the Yomiuri Giants, he was selected for the Japan Series roster.

On May 7, 2020, Takada underwent surgery on his left leg joint. As a result, he was unable to play in the Pacific League for the 2020 season. In the 2020 Japan Series against the Yomiuri Giants, he was selected for the Japan Series roster.

=== 2021–2022 season ===
In the 2021 season, Takata finished the regular season in 61 games with a batting average of .231, an RBI of 2, and one stolen base.

In the 2022 season, he appeared in only 17 games. On October 30, Takata announced his retirement after the 2022 season.

=== After retirement ===
On October 31, 2022, the Fukuoka SoftBank Hawks announced that Takata would be the rehabilitation coach from the 2023 season.

On December 2, 2023, he was transferred to the second squad infield defense and base running coach.
