= Ryosuke Ogata =

Japanese baseball player (born 1990)

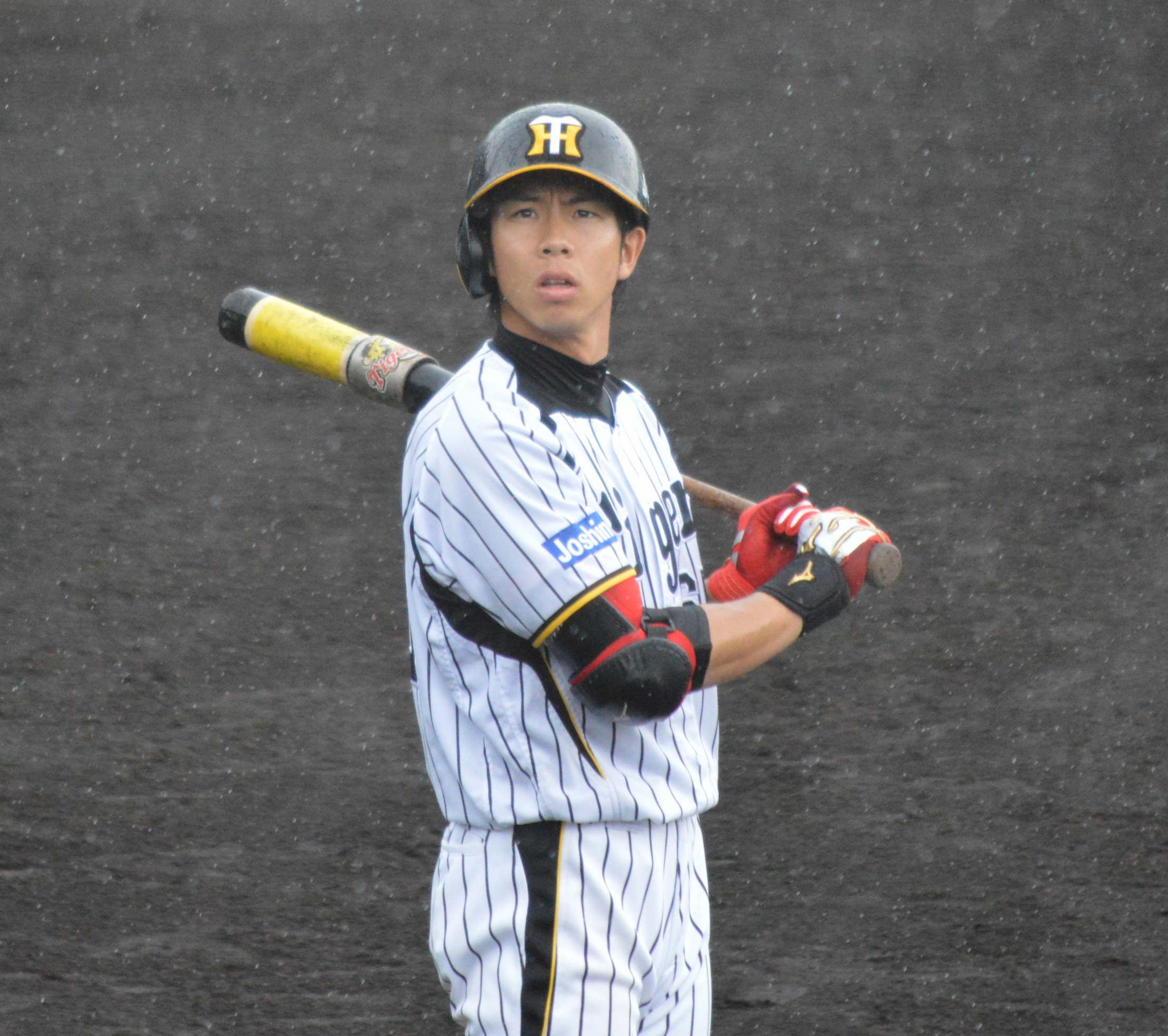
- Ogata with the Hanshin Tigers
- Outfielder
- Born: August 25, 1990 (age 35); Sumiyoshi-ku, Osaka, Japan
- Bats: Left Throws: Right

NPB debut
- 2013, for the Hanshin Tigers

NPB statistics (through 2016)
- Batting average: .220
- Home runs: 2
- RBI: 5
- Stats at Baseball Reference

Teams
- Hanshin Tigers (2013–2018)

Ryosuke Ogata (緒方 凌介; born August 25, 1990 in Sumiyoshi-ku, Osaka) is a Japanese professional baseball outfielder for the Hanshin Tigers in Japan's Nippon Professional Baseball.

== High school and college baseball Career ==
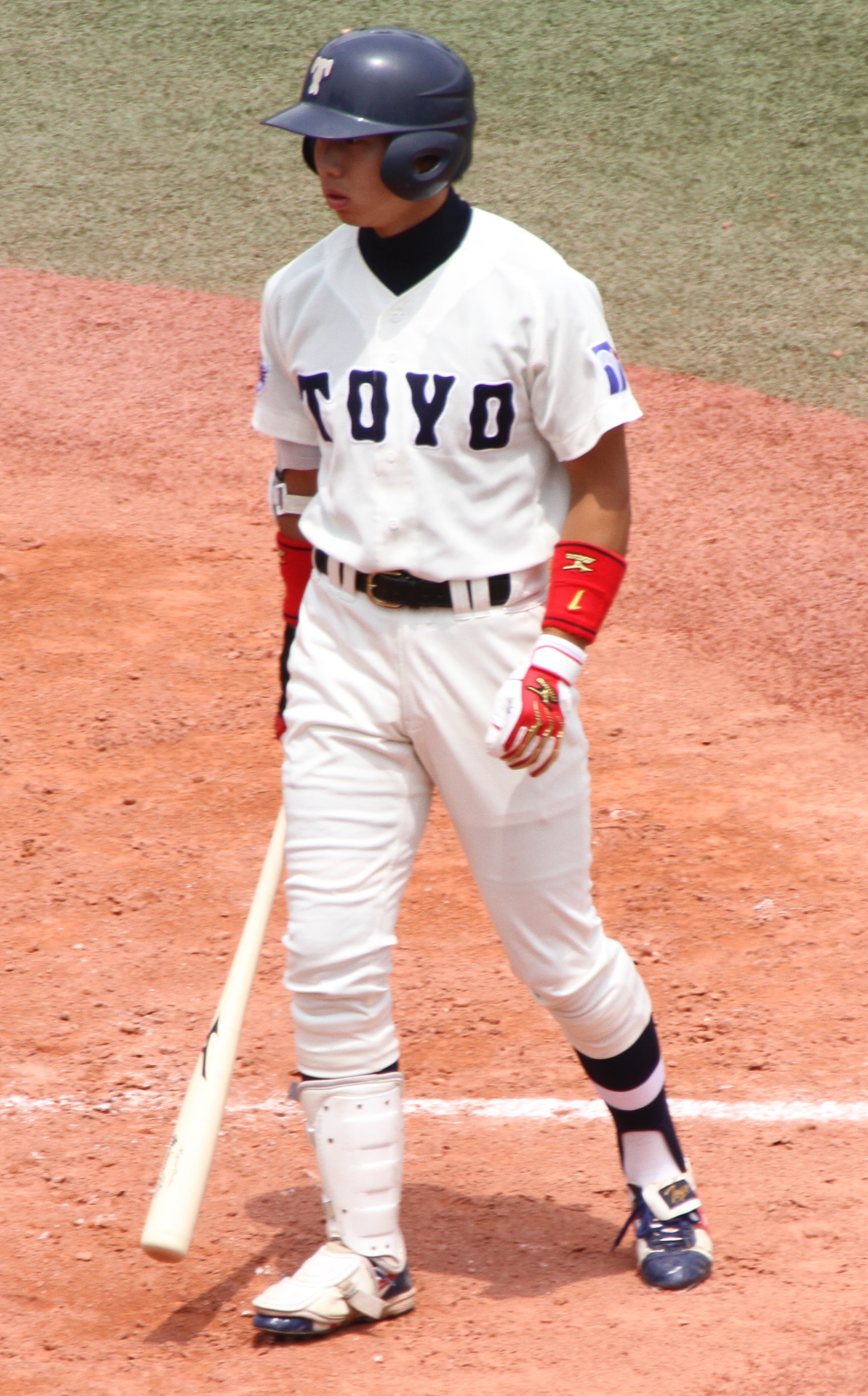

Raised by parents who were both avid Hanshin fans, Ryosuke was able to watch a lot of the Tiger's games in Koshien as a child. According to him, he wanted to become like Tsuyoshi Shinjo, a former Hanshin player.

He attended PL Gakuen High School where he played as a center-fielder. During his 2nd year, he participated in the autumn Kinki Tournament but their team was defeated in their first match. The year after, his team managed to make it to the finals of the Southern Osaka Tournament. However, they lost to Kinki University's high school team when the opponent scored a hit at the end of overtime, ending their chance to make it to the National Baseball Championship Tournament.

He attended the same high school as Kenta Maeda of the Hiroshima Carp, who is 2 years his senior.

He then entered Toyo University where he participated in the Tohto University Baseball League. During his first year, their team won their 2nd consecutive All Japan University Baseball Championship Series. He was elected as team captain on his senior year. On the spring of that year, he underwent reconstructive surgery due to an injury to his right knee.

In the 71 games he played during college, he finished with a record of .200 batting average, 3 home runs and 18 RBIs.

His motto was "Devote yourself wholeheartedly".

== Hanshin Tigers ==
He was the Tigers no. 6 pick in the 2012 draft, and was assigned the uniform no. 65. When asked which pitcher he would like the most to play against after he turned professional, he answered Kenta Maeda.

In 2013, in order for him to better adjust after undergoing knee surgery, he was given a separate training menu during the spring rookie training. His first regular game appearance was on May 3, in a match vs Tokyo Yakult Swallows at Koshien. He substituted as a pinch runner for Matt Murton who just delivered a 2-base hit. He was then driven in by Hayata Ito. For the remainder of the season, he played in the team's ni-gun games.

In 2014, he again returned to ichi-gun where he made it to the team's starting line-up as right outfielder on May 13. On June 7's inter-league match with Orix Buffaloes, he recorded his first RBI and home-run from Tohmei Daiki. A week later, in the game vs. the Seibu Lions, he hit a 3-run homer off Ryoma Nogami during the fifth inning, and then scored another run at the bottom of the 6th, earning him his first ever victory hero interview.

== Playing style ==
Ryosuke is a 176 cm outfielder whose right arm boasts a 120-meter throwing distance。. His 50-meter dash was clocked at 5.8 seconds, and his defensive range is broad. Batting-wise, he delivers a compact swing.

== Personal life ==
Instead of the usual omamori (good luck charm), his father handed down to him a 1.3 kg baseball bat that he used since he was 5th grade in elementary. He still uses it for practice, and hangs it in his room during the team's away games.
