= Takahiro Matsuba =

Japanese baseball player (born 1990)

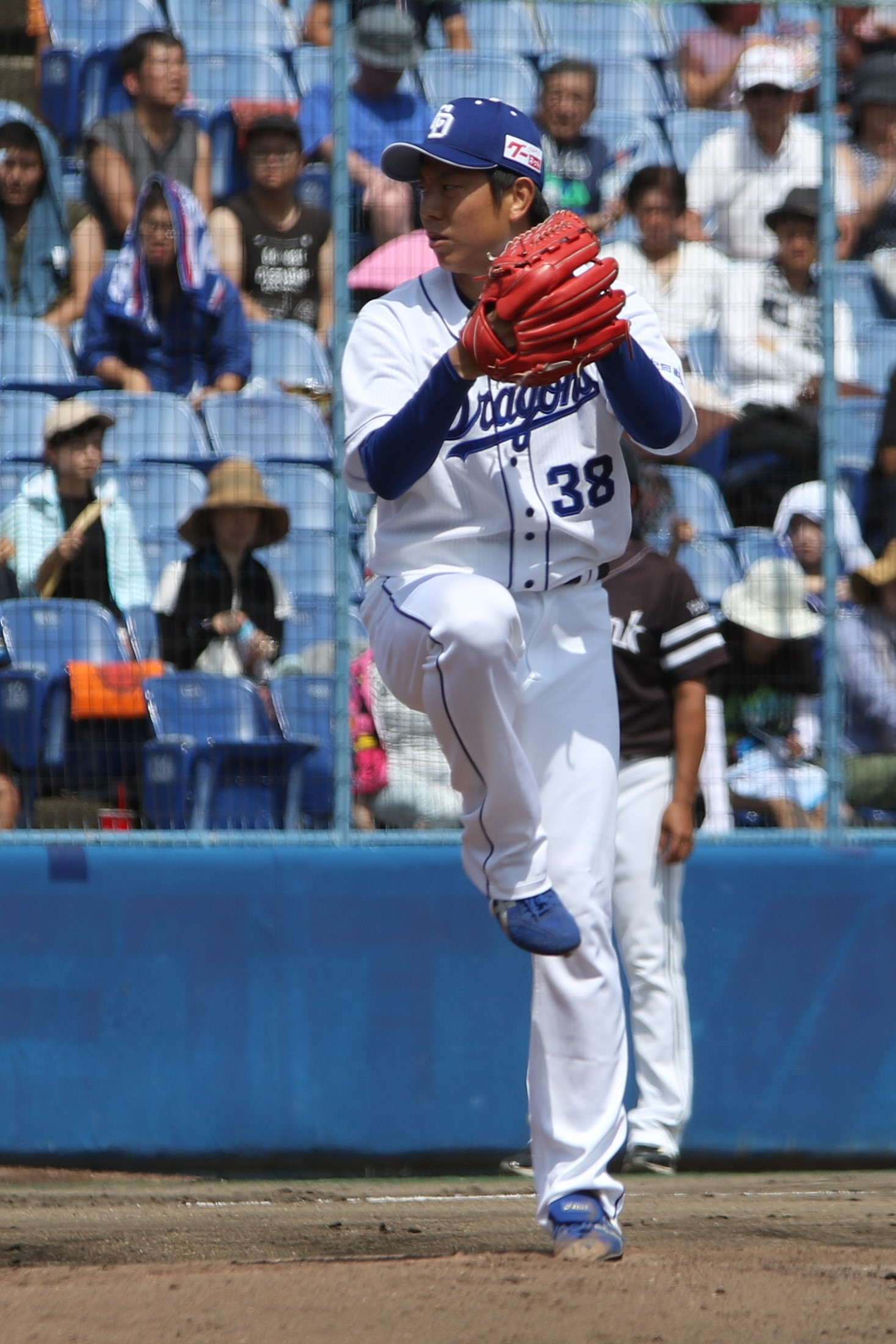
- Matsuba with the Chunichi Dragons

Chunichi Dragons – No. 38
- Pitcher
- Born: August 14, 1990 (age 35); Kanzaki District, Hyōgo, Japan
- Bats: Left Throws: Left

NPB debut
- May 1, 2013, for the Orix Buffaloes

NPB statistics (through July 21, 2026)
- Win–loss record: 55–80
- Earned run average: 3.60
- Strikeouts: 646
- Stats at Baseball Reference

Teams
- Orix Buffaloes (2013–2019); Chunichi Dragons (2019–present)

Career highlights and awards
- NPB All-Star (2025)

Takahiro Matsuba (松葉 貴大, Matsuba Takahiro; born August 14, 1990) is a Japanese professional baseball pitcher for the Chunichi Dragons of Nippon Professional Baseball (NPB). He has previously played in NPB for the Orix Buffaloes.
