= Shōhei Katō =

Japanese baseball player (born 1991)

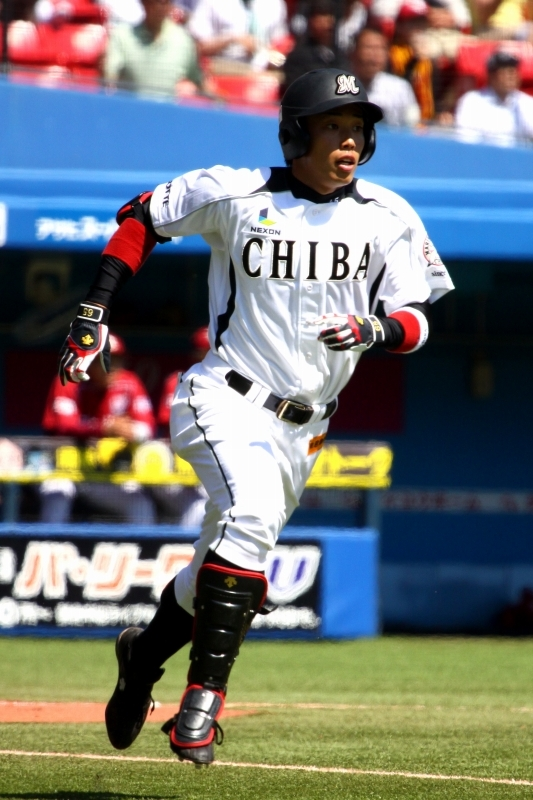
- Kato with the Chiba Lotte Marines
- Outfielder
- Born: March 28, 1991 (age 35); Saitama, Japan
- Batted: Switch Threw: Right

NPB debut
- May 12, 2013, for the Chiba Lotte Marines

Last NPB appearance
- September 30, 2023, for the Chunichi Dragons

Career statistics
- Batting average: .242
- Home runs: 16
- Runs batted in: 94
- Stats at Baseball Reference

Teams
- Chiba Lotte Marines (2013–2021); Chunichi Dragons (2021–2024)

Shōhei Katō (加藤 翔平, Katō Shōhei) (born March 28, 1991) is a Japanese former professional baseball outfielder. He played in Nippon Professional Baseball (NPB) from 2013 to 2023 for the Chiba Lotte Marines and Chunichi Dragons.

== Career ==
On September 18, 2024, Katō announced that he would be retiring following the conclusion of the season.
