= Susumu Ohrui =

Japanese baseball player (born 1990)

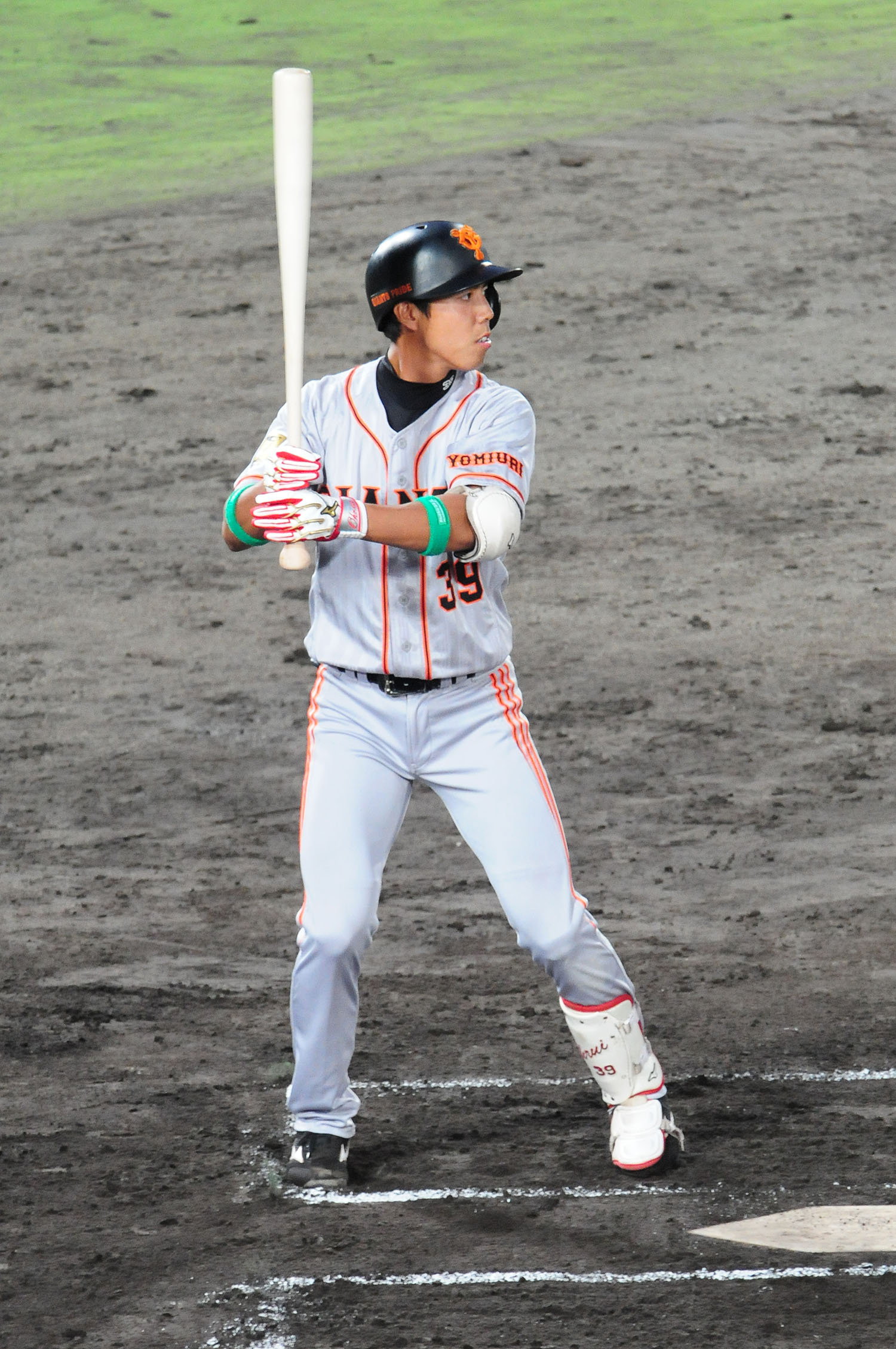
- Infielder
- Born: August 31, 1990 (age 35); Sapporo, Hokkaido, Japan
- Bats: Right Throws: Right

debut
- August 11, 2013, for the Yomiuri Giants

Career statistics (through 2016 season)
- Batting average: .000
- Home runs: 0
- Runs batted in: 0
- Stats at Baseball Reference

Teams
- Yomiuri Giants (2013–2016); Hokkaido Nippon-Ham Fighters (2016–2018)

Susumu Ohrui (大累 進, Ohrui Susumu; born August 31, 1990 in Sapporo, Hokkaido, Japan) is a professional Japanese baseball player. He plays infielder for the Hokkaido Nippon-Ham Fighters.
