= Shogo Yagi =

Japanese baseball player

- Pitcher
- Born: March 29, 1989 (age 37); Uruma, Okinawa, Japan
- Batted: Left Threw: Right

NPB debut
- July 15, 2013, for the Hokkaido Nippon-Ham Fighters

Last NPB appearance
- May 19, 2019, for the Tokyo Yakult Swallows

Career statistics (through 2017 season)
- Win–loss record: 3–0
- ERA: 6.75
- Strikeouts: 14
- Stats at Baseball Reference

Teams
- Hokkaido Nippon-Ham Fighters (2013–2015); Tokyo Yakult Swallows (2017-2019)

Shogo Yagi (屋宜 照悟, Yagi Shōgo) is a Japanese former professional baseball pitcher. He previously played for the Hokkaido Nippon-Ham Fighters and Tokyo Yakult Swallows of the Nippon Professional Baseball(NPB).

On November 30, 2019, he announced his retirement.
