= Yuya Iida =

Japanese baseball player

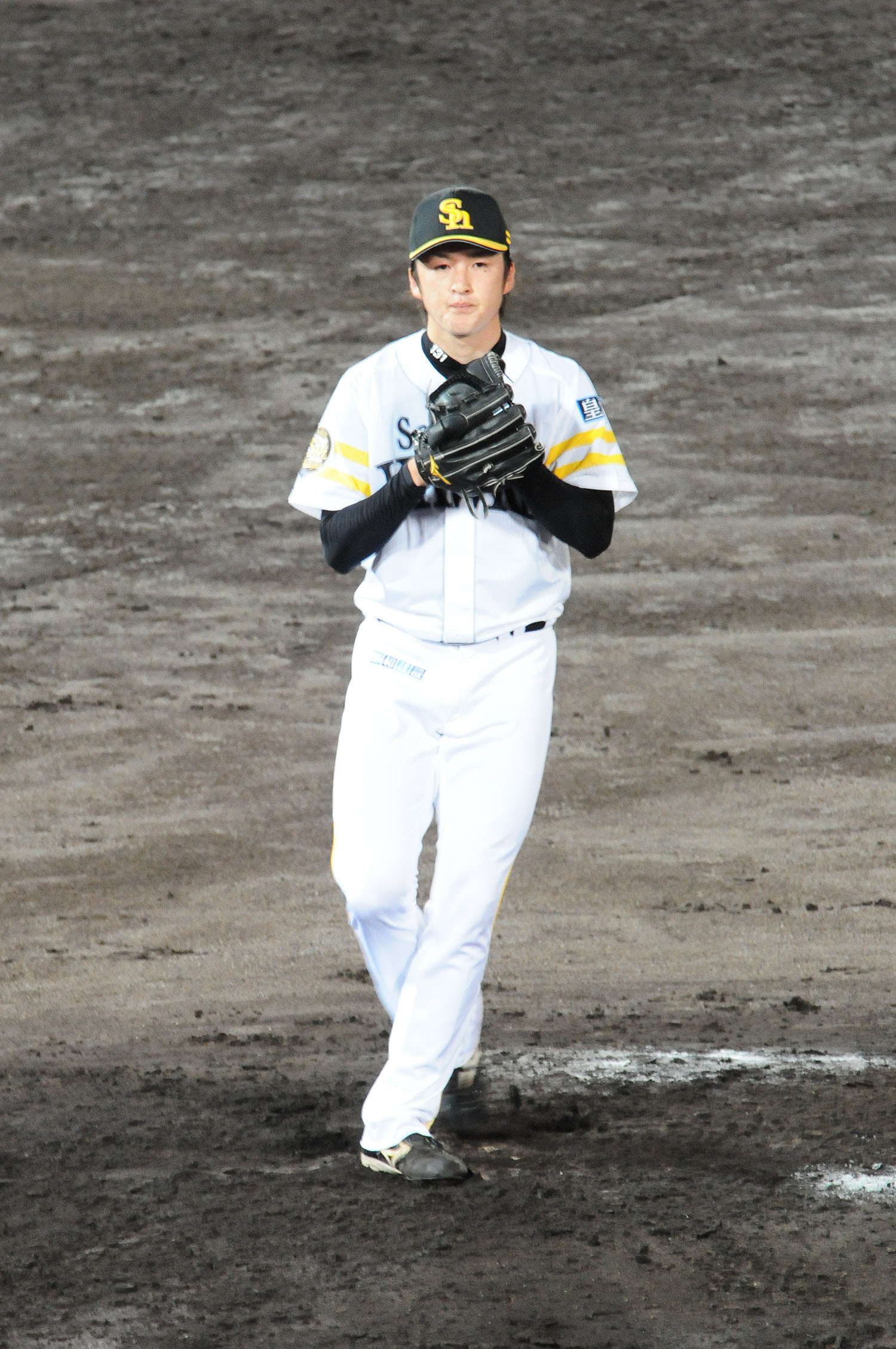
- Iida with the Fukuoka SoftBank Hawks
- pitcher
- Born: November 27, 1990 (age 35); Kobe, Hyōgo, Japan
- Batted: Left Threw: Left

debut
- June 11, 2014, for the Fukuoka SoftBank Hawks

Last appearance
- September 13, 2020, for the Orix Buffaloes

NPB statistics (through 2020 season)
- Win–loss record: 5-6
- ERA: 3.89
- Holds: 10
- Saves: 0
- Strikeouts: 169
- Stats at Baseball Reference

Teams
- Fukuoka SoftBank Hawks (2013–2018); Hanshin Tigers (2018–2020); Orix Buffaloes (2020–2021)

Career highlights and awards
- 3× Japan Series Champion (2014, 2015, 2017)

Yuya Iida (飯田 優也, Iida Yuya; born November 27, 1990 in Hyogo, Hyōgo, Japan) is a Japanese former professional baseball pitcher. He played for the Fukuoka SoftBank Hawks, Hanshin Tigers and Orix Buffaloes of Nippon Professional Baseball (NPB).
