= Kazuki Mishima =

Japanese baseball player (born 1990)

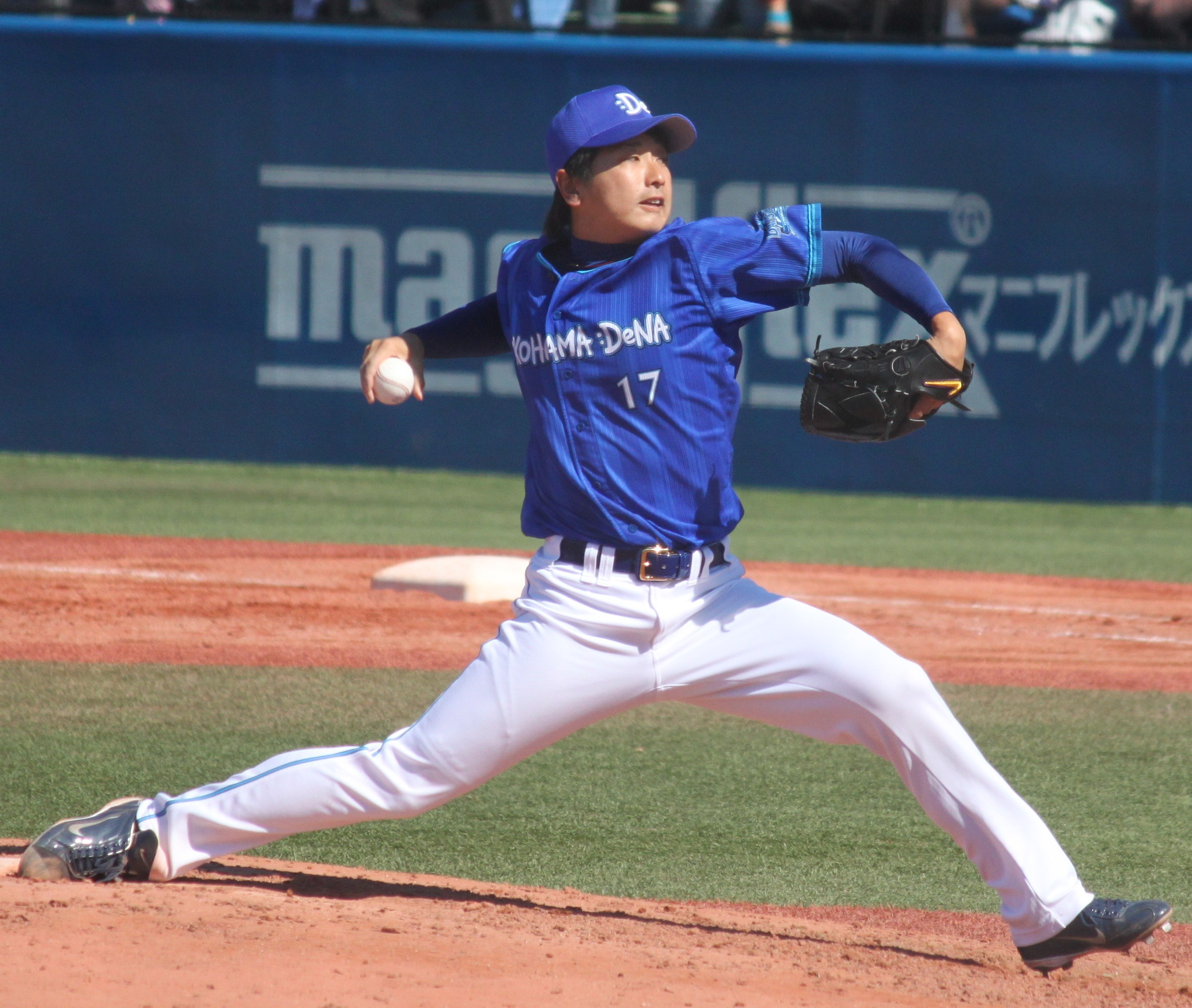
- Mishima with the Yokohama DeNA BayStars
- Pitcher
- Born: May 7, 1990 (age 35); Fukuoka, Fukuoka, Japan
- Batted: Switch Threw: Right

NPB debut
- March 31, 2013, for the Yokohama DeNA BayStars

Last NPB appearance
- August 22, 2025, for the Yokohama DeNA BayStars

Career statistics
- Win–loss record: 37-34
- Earned run average: 4.47
- Strikeouts: 554
- Saves: 42
- Holds: 56
- Stats at Baseball Reference

Teams
- Yokohama DeNA BayStars (2013–2025)

Career highlights and awards
- 2× NPB All-Star (2013, 2021)

Kazuki Mishima (三嶋 一輝, Mishima Kazuki; born May 7, 1990) is a former professional Japanese baseball player. He has pitched for the Yokohama DeNA BayStars.
