= Hidekazu Kawano =

Japanese baseball player (born 1987)

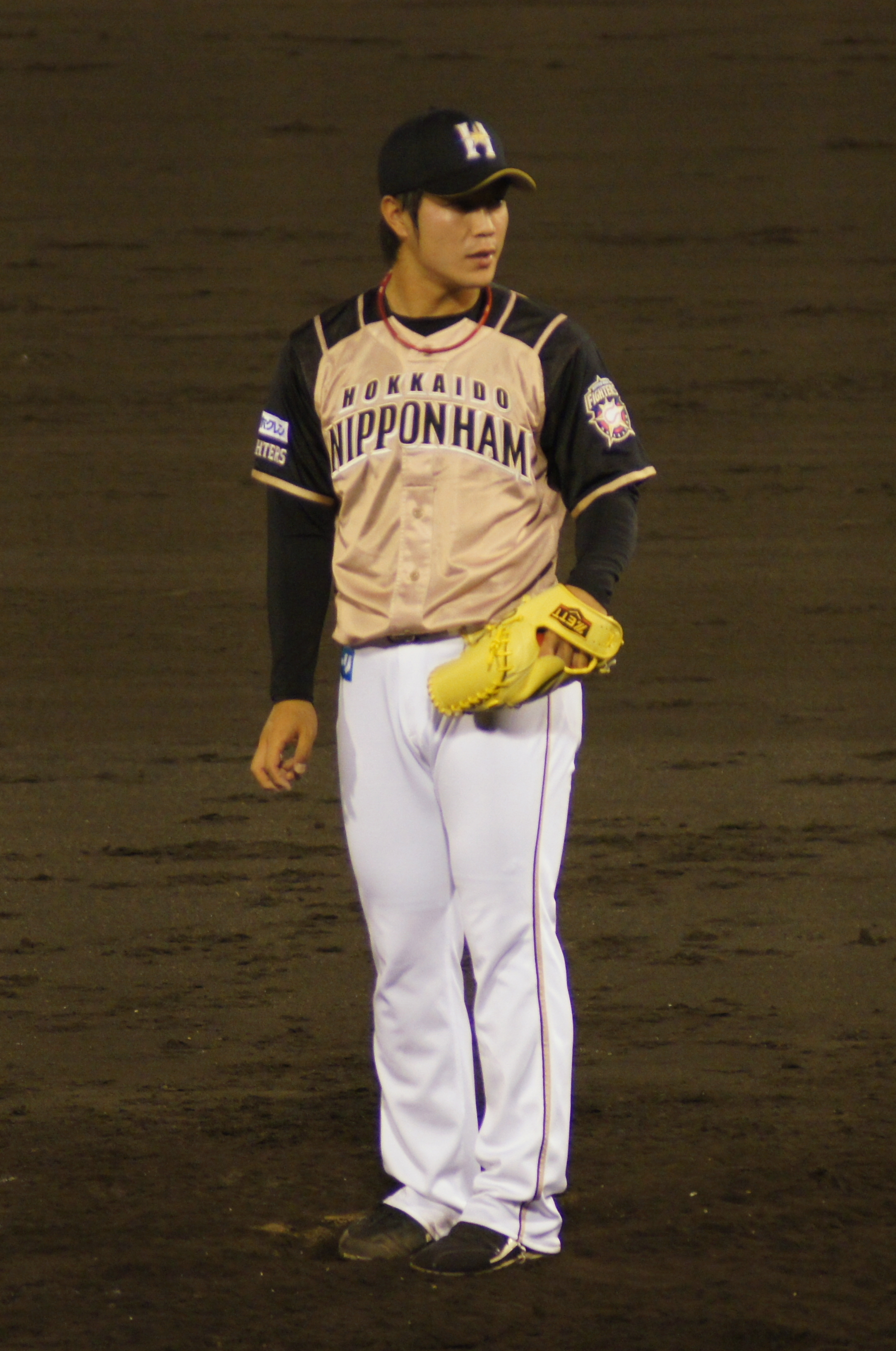
- Kawano with the Hokkaido Nippon Ham Fighters
- Pitcher
- Born: December 14, 1987 (age 38)
- Bats: Right Throws: Right

debut
- 2013, for the Hokkaido Nippon-Ham Fighters

Career statistics (through 2013 season)
- WHIP: 1.361
- ERA: 2.23
- SO: 24

Teams
- Hokkaido Nippon-Ham Fighters (2013–2015)

Hidekazu Kawano (河野 秀数, Kawano Hidekazu) is a Japanese professional baseball player. He played two seasons with Hokkaido Nippon Ham Fighters in 2013 and 2014. He was born on December 14, 1987. He debuted in 2013. He had 24 strikeouts.
