= Takeru Furumoto =

Japanese baseball player (born 1990)

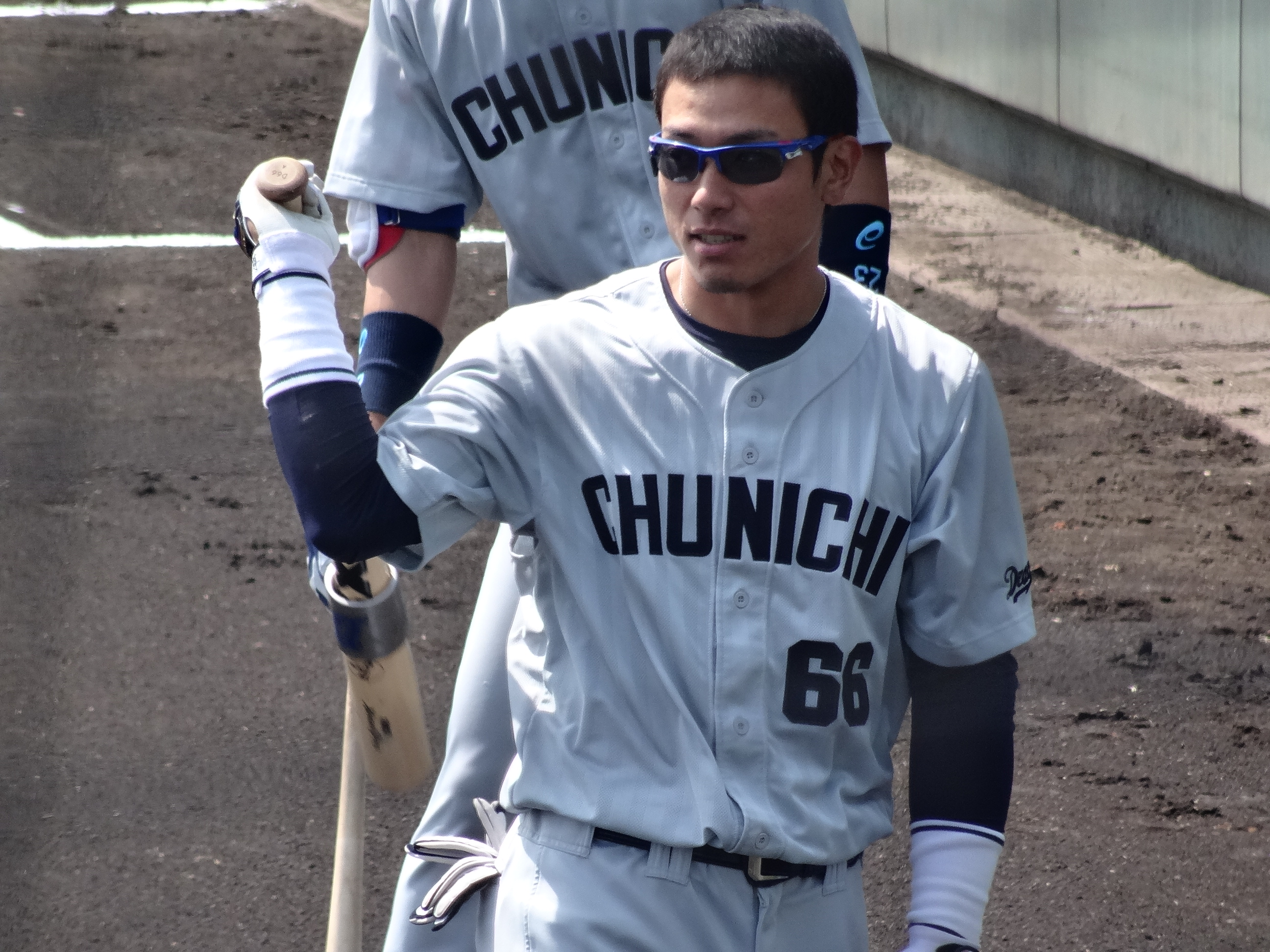
- Outfielder
- Born: December 4, 1990 (age 35); Fukuoka, Fukuoka, Japan
- Bats: Left Throws: Right

NPB debut
- September 3, 2014, for the Chunichi Dragons

NPB statistics (through 2014)
- Batting average: .167
- Home runs: 0
- RBI: 0
- Stats at Baseball Reference

Teams
- Chunichi Dragons (2013–2017)

Takeru Furumoto (古本 武尊, Furumoto Takeru; born December 12, 1990 in Minami-ku, Fukuoka, Fukuoka, Japan) is a retired Japanese baseball player. He played outfield for the Chunichi Dragons.
