= Tatsurō Hamada =

Japanese baseball player

Tatsurō Hamada 濱田達郎
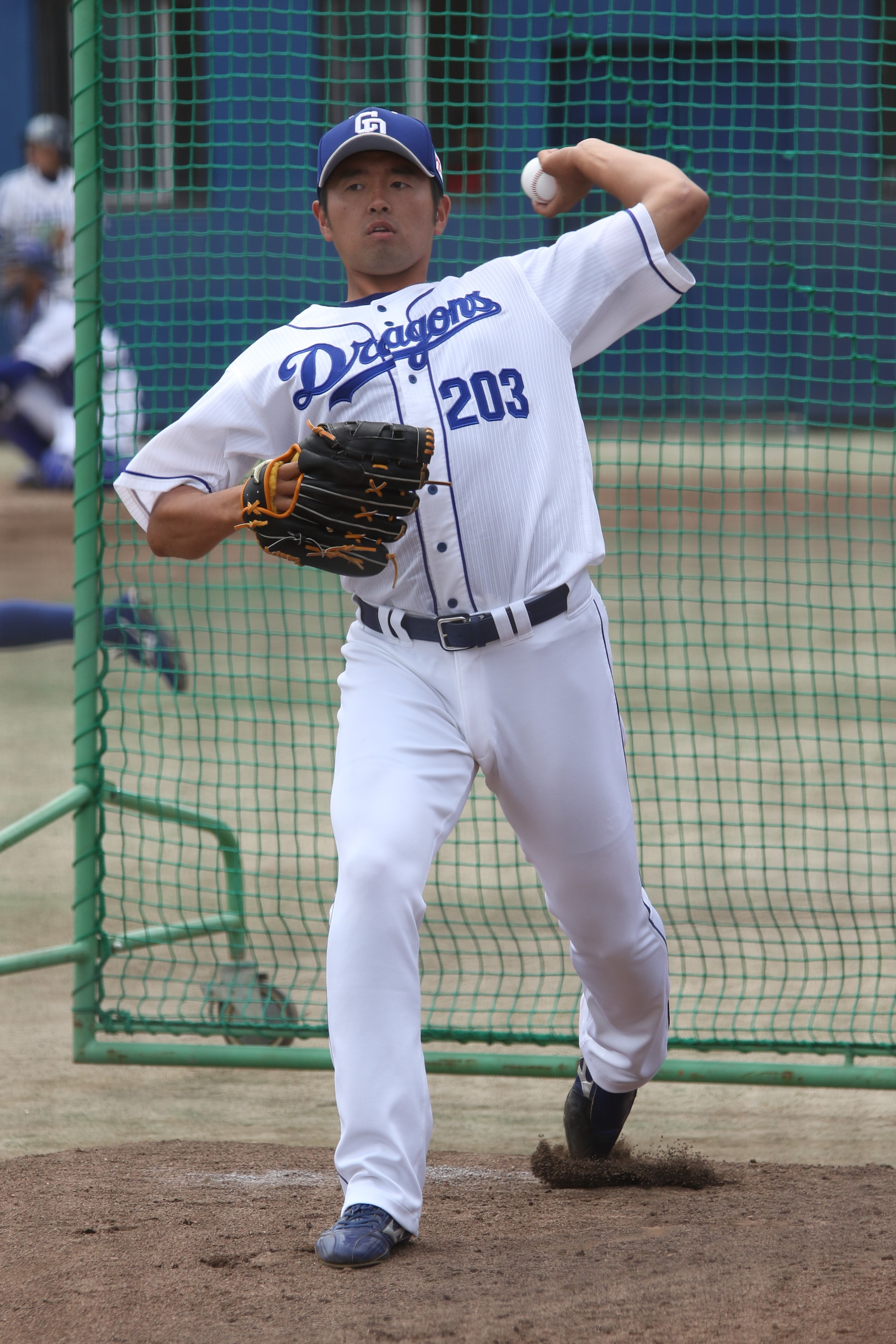
- Pitcher
- Born: August 4, 1994 (age 31); Nagoya, Aichi, Japan
- Bats: Left Throws: Left

debut
- April 29, 2014, for the Chunichi Dragons

NPB statistics (through 2020 season)
- Win–loss: 5-7
- ERA: 5.16
- Strikeouts: 86
- Stats at Baseball Reference

Teams
- Chunichi Dragons (2013–2022)

Tatsurō Hamada (濱田 達郎, Hamada Tatsurō; born August 4, 1994 in Nagoya, Aichi, Japan) is a professional Japanese baseball pitcher. He played for the Chunichi Dragons for 9-years.

During his time in high school, Hamada was rated alongside Shintaro Fujinami (now of the Hanshin Tigers) and Shohei Ohtani (now of the Los Angeles Angels) as one of the top 3 pitchers in his age bracket.

== Early career ==
As a high school pitcher, Hamada was rated alongside Shintaro Fujinami and Shohei Ohtani as the "big three" pitchers of the Koshien tournament.

== Professional career ==
=== Chunichi Dragons ===
==== 2016–2018 ====
After performing well in spring training, Hamada earned a spot in the starting rotation for the 2016 season where on 30 March he faced up to the Hiroshima Carp in an 11-3 loss. Hamada would give up five walks, eight hits and seven earned runs in his four innings pitched.

Hamada would fail to make any further appearances with the first team in the 2016 season and as such had his contract downgraded to a trainee status for the upcoming 2017 season.

On 24 April 2017, Hamada underwent surgery for ulnar nerve palsy in his left elbow and although was unable to pitch that year, was re-signed at the end of the season.

On 27 June 2018, he returned to the mound in the first time in two years against the Orix Buffaloes in the Western League, but it was later discovered Hamada has a blood circulation defect in his left arm where he underwent surgery once again.

==== 2019 ====
Hamada pitched in 17 games on the farm for an 8.77 ERA but was given a full-time roster deal ahead of the 2020 season, being assigned the #69 jersey.
