= Hayato Arakaki =

Japanese baseball player (born 1985)

- Pitcher
- Born: October 21, 1985 (age 40)
- Batted: Right Threw: Right

debut
- April 9, 2013, for the Hokkaido Nippon-Ham Fighters

Last appearance
- April 21, 2018, for the Hokkaido Nippon-Ham Fighters

Career statistics (through 2018 season)
- Win–loss record: 1–3
- ERA: 7.96
- Strikeouts: 22

Teams
- Hokkaido Nippon-Ham Fighters (2013–2018)

Hayato Arakaki (新垣 勇人, Arakaki Hayato) is a Japanese professional baseball player. He was born on October 21, 1985. He debuted in 2013 for the Hokkaido Nippon-Ham Fighters.
