= Ryota Yachi =

Japanese baseball player (born 1991)

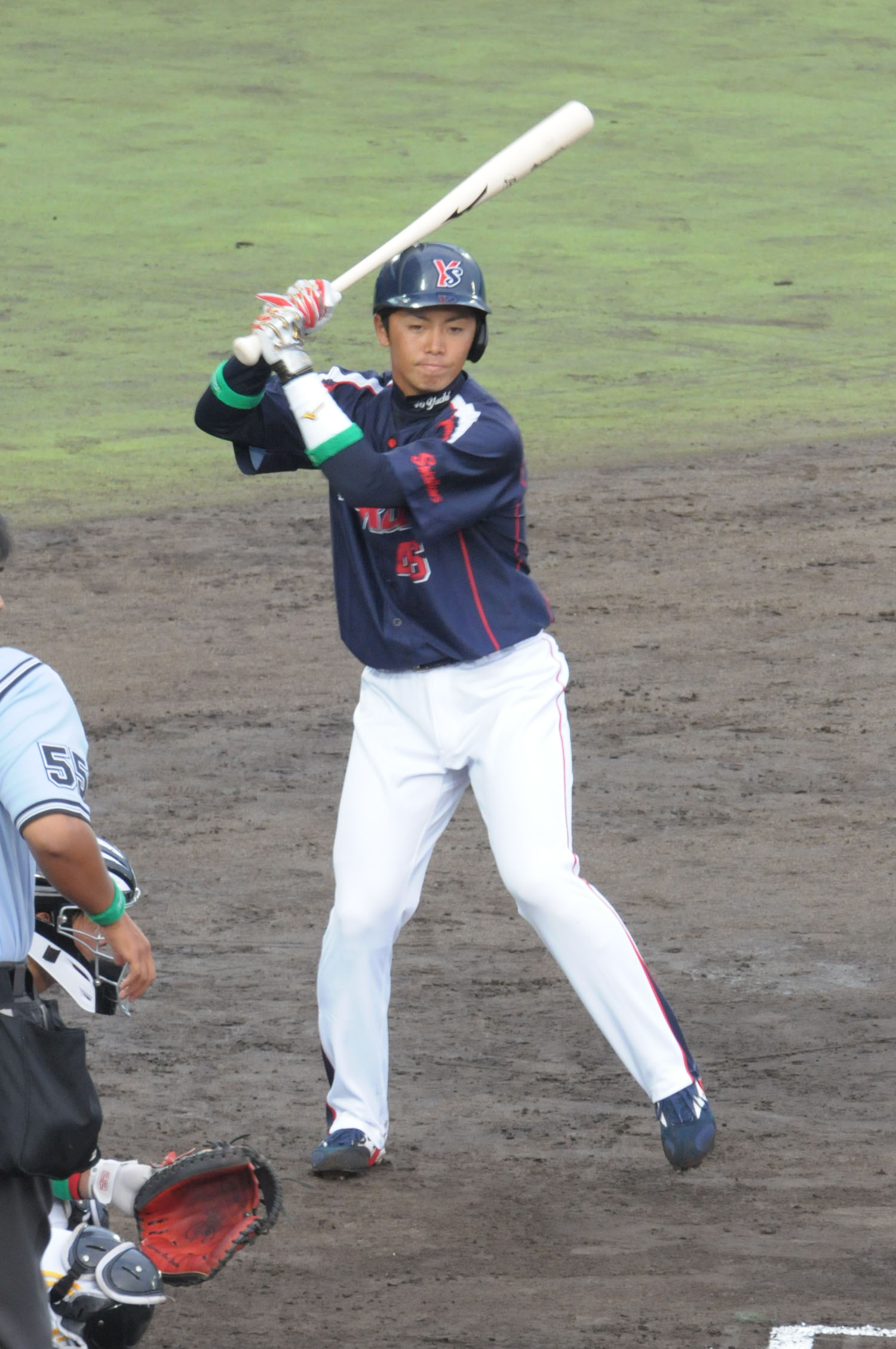
- Yachi with the Tokyo Yakult Swallows

Hokkaido Nippon-Ham Fighters – No. 85
- Infielder / Coach
- Born: February 3, 1991 (age 35); Kanazawa, Ishikawa, Japan
- Batted: Right Threw: Right

NPB debut
- August 28, 2013, for the Tokyo Yakult Swallows

Last NPB appearance
- September 27, 2023, for the Hokkaido Nippon-Ham Fighters

NPB statistics (through 2023 season)
- Batting average: .227
- Hits: 143
- Home runs: 3
- RBI: 60
- Stolen bases: 0
- Stats at Baseball Reference

Teams
- As player: Tokyo Yakult Swallows (2013–2018); Hokkaido Nippon-Ham Fighters (2019–2023); As coach: Hokkaido Nippon-Ham Fighters (2024–present)

Ryota Yachi (谷内 亮太, Yachi Ryota; born February 3, 1991 in Kanazawa, Ishikawa, Japan) is a former professional Japanese baseball player. He plays infielder for the Hokkaido Nippon-Ham Fighters.
