= Takahito Otsuka =

Japanese baseball player

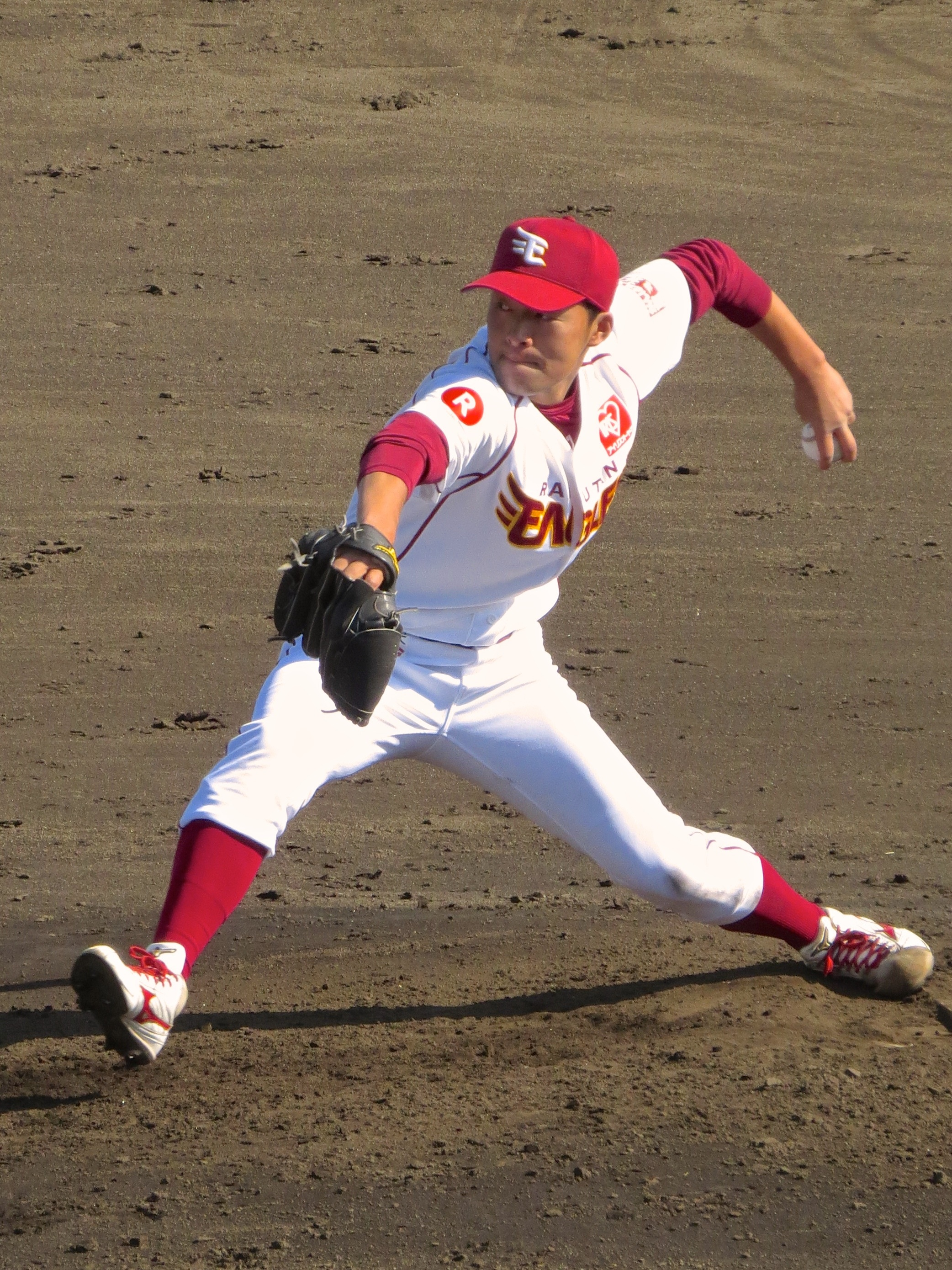
- Otsukawith the Tohoku Rakuten Golden Eagles
- Pitcher
- Born: October 13, 1994 (age 31)
- Bats: Left Throws: Left

NPB debut
- 2015, for the Tohoku Rakuten Golden Eagles

NPB statistics (through 2016)
- Games pitched: 9
- ERA: 12.27
- Strikeouts: 5
- Stats at Baseball Reference

Teams
- Tohoku Rakuten Golden Eagles (2015–2016)

Takahito Otsuka (大塚 尚仁, Ōtsuka Takahito; born October 13, 1994, in Yame, Fukuoka, Fukuoka Prefecture) is a Japanese former professional baseball pitcher in Japan's Nippon Professional Baseball (NBP). He played for the Tohoku Rakuten Golden Eagles in 2015 and 2016.
