= Hiroyuki Shirasaki =

Japanese baseball player (born 1990)

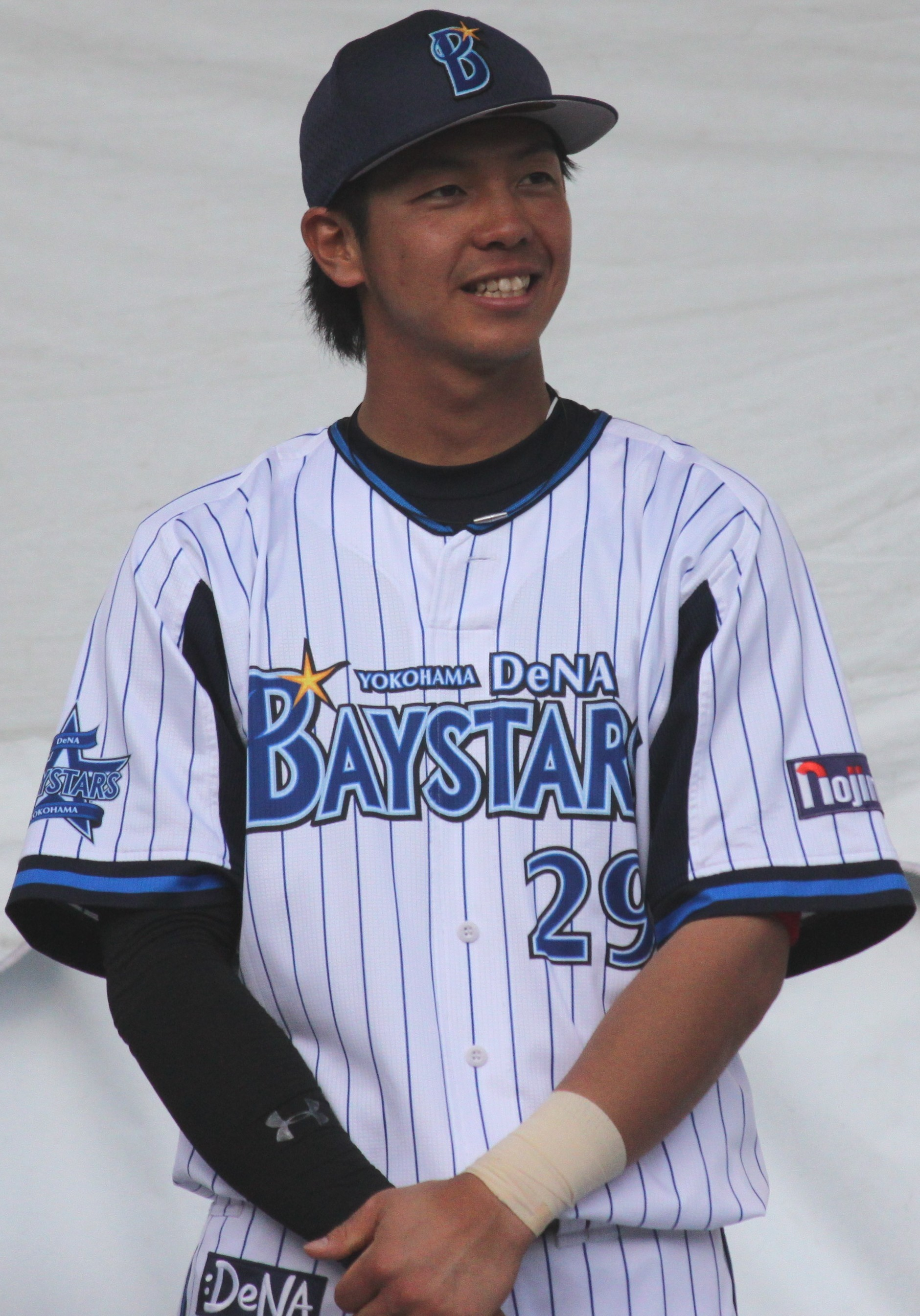
- Shirasaki with the Yokohama DeNA BayStars

Free Agent
- Infielder
- Born: August 20, 1990 (age 35); Iwamizawa, Hokkaido, Japan
- Bats: Right Throws: Right

debut
- May 1, 2013, for the Yokohama DeNA BayStars

NPB statistics (through 2020 season)
- Batting average: .220
- Home runs: 16
- Hits: 184
- RBI: 52
- Stolen bases: 6
- Stats at Baseball Reference

Teams
- Yokohama DeNA BayStars (2013–2018); Orix Buffaloes (2018– 2020)

Hiroyuki Shirasaki (白崎 浩之, Shirasaki Hiroyuki; born August 20, 1990) is a Japaneseprofessional baseball infielder who is currently a free agent. . He has played in Nippon Professional Baseball (NPB) for the Yokohama DeNA BayStars and Orix Buffaloes.

== Career ==
Yokohama DeNA BayStars selected Shirasaki with the first selection in the 2012 draft.

On May 1, 2013, Shirasaki made his NPB debut.

On December 2, 2020, he become a free agent.
