= Yudai Mori =

Japanese baseball player

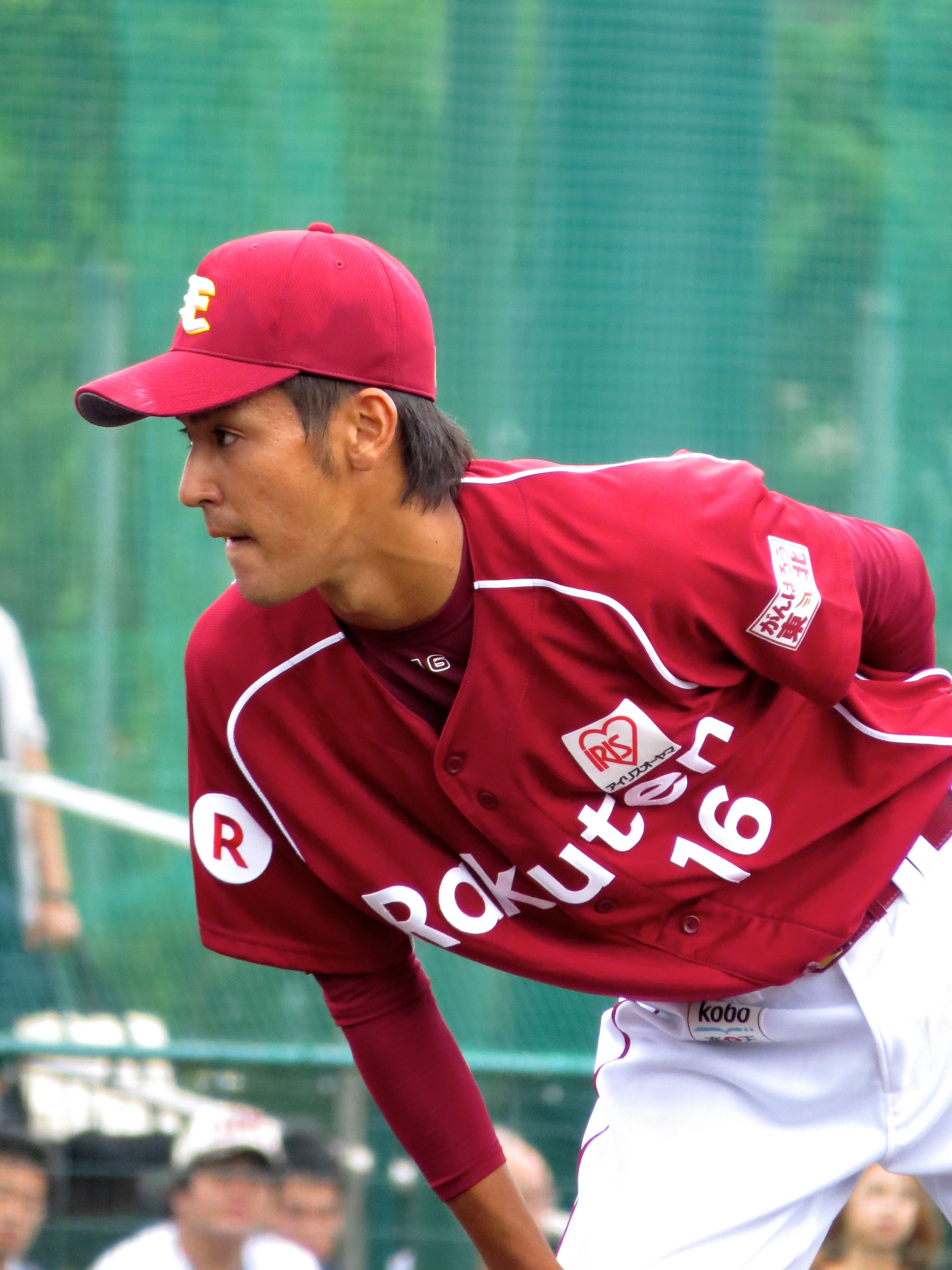
- Mori with the Tohoku Rakuten Golden Eagles
- Pitcher
- Born: August 19, 1994 (age 31); Fukuoka, Japan
- Bats: Left Throws: Left

NPB debut
- 2014, for the Tohoku Rakuten Golden Eagles

NPB statistics (through 2018)
- Win–loss record: 3-6
- ERA: 4.58
- Strikeouts: 65

Teams
- Tohoku Rakuten Golden Eagles (2014–2015, 2017–2018)

Yudai Mori (森 雄大, born August 19, 1994, in Fukuoka, Fukuoka Prefecture) is a Japanese professional baseball pitcher for the Tohoku Rakuten Golden Eagles in Japan's Nippon Professional Baseball.
