= Taichi Ishiyama =

Japanese baseball player (born 1988)

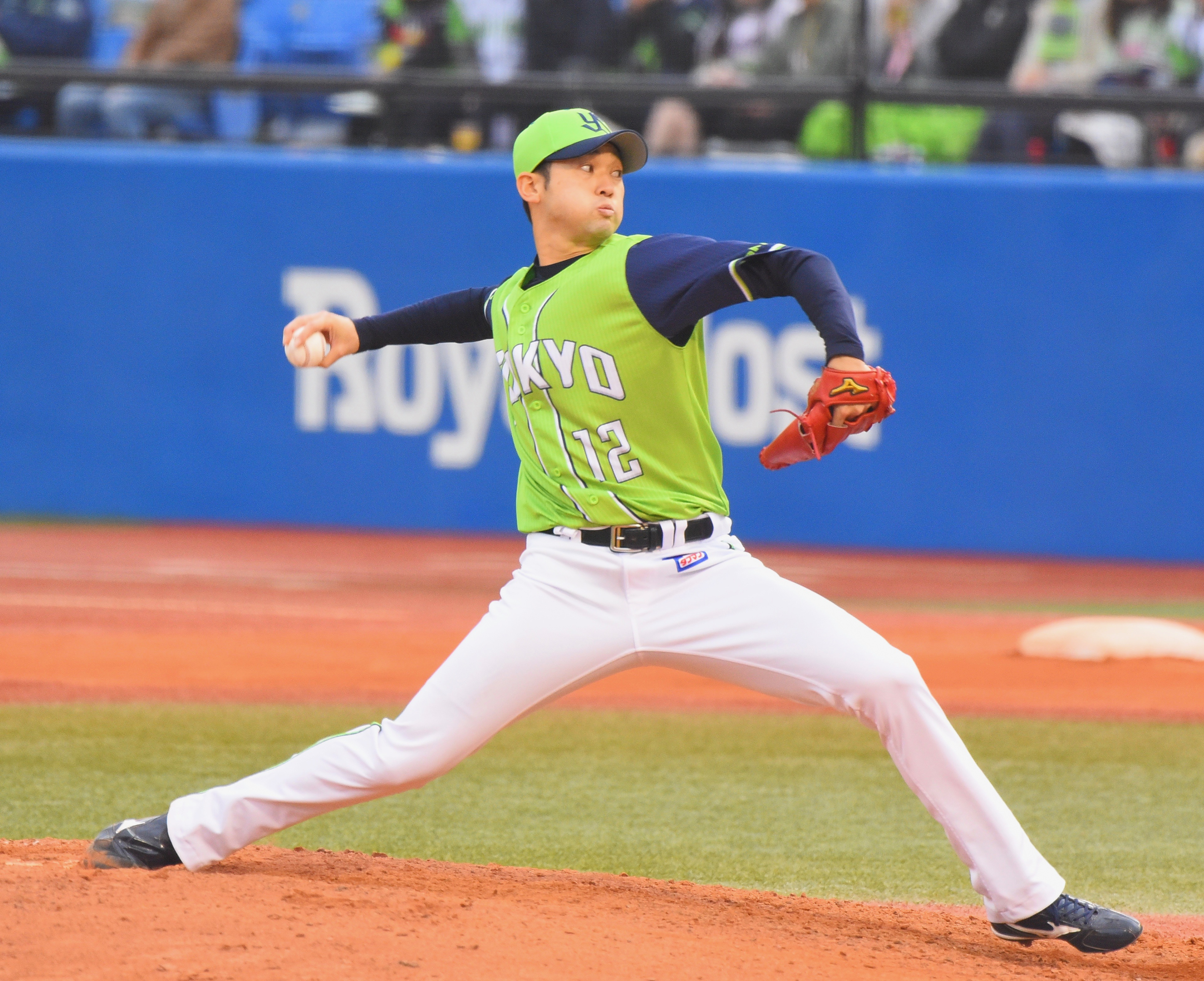
- Ishiyama in 2018 with the Tokyo Yakult Swallows

Tokyo Yakult Swallows – No. 12
- Pitcher
- Born: September 1, 1988 (age 37); Akita, Akita, Japan
- Bats: Right Throws: Right

NPB debut
- April 14, 2013, for the Tokyo Yakult Swallows

NPB statistics (through 2025 season)
- Win–loss record: 32–42
- Earned run average: 3.34
- Strikeouts: 670
- Saves: 104
- Stats at Baseball Reference

Teams
- Tokyo Yakult Swallows (2013–present)

Career highlights and awards
- 3× NPB All-Star (2013, 2018, 2025); Japan Series champion (2021)

Taichi Ishiyama (石山 泰稚, Ishiyama Taichi; born September 1, 1988) is a Japanese professional baseball pitcher for the Tokyo Yakult Swallows of Nippon Professional Baseball (NPB).

== Career ==
Ishiyama was selected to the 2018 NPB All-Star game. On October 10, 2018, he was selected for the Japan national baseball team at the 2018 MLB Japan All-Star Series, but on October 26, he canceled his participation for the team.
