= Kazuyuki Kaneda =

Japanese baseball player

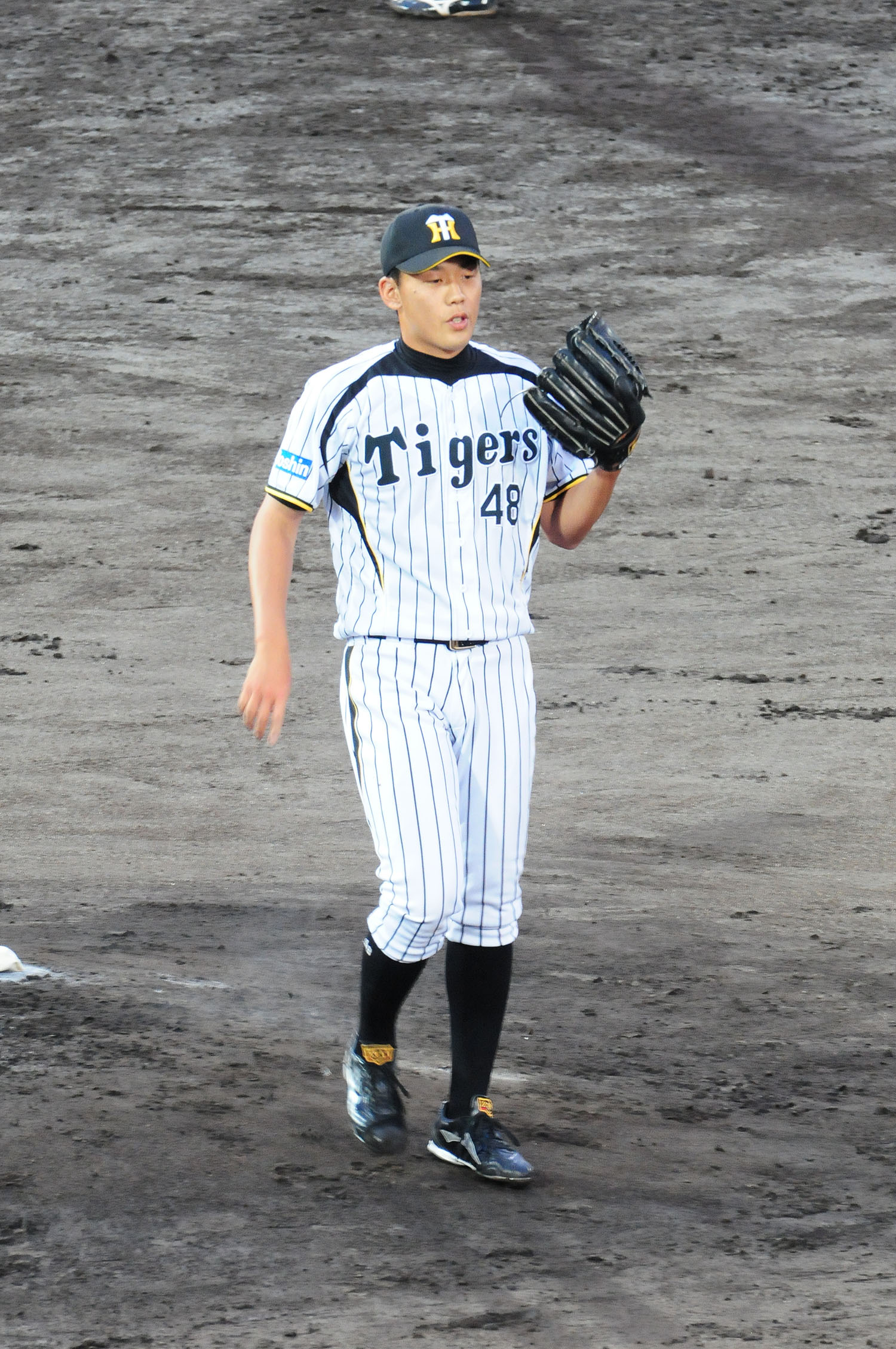
- Kaneda with the Hanshin Tigers

Orix Buffaloes – No. 58
- Pitcher
- Born: September 18, 1990 (age 35); Takarabe, Kagoshima, Japan
- Bats: Right Throws: Right

NPB debut
- March 28, 2014, for the Hanshin Tigers

NPB statistics (through 2020 season)
- Win–loss record: 12–2
- Earned run average: 4.66
- Strikeouts: 109
- Holds: 2
- Saves: 0
- Stats at Baseball Reference

Teams
- Hanshin Tigers (2014–2016); Orix Buffaloes (2017–present)

Kazuyuki Kaneda (金田 和之, Kaneda Kazuyuki; born September 18, 1990) is a Japanese professional baseball pitcher for the Orix Buffaloes in Japan's Nippon Professional Baseball. Kaneda was drafted 5th in the 2012 draft and made his first team debut on opening day of the 2014 season (March 28, 2014), pitching a scoreless 7th inning against the Yomiuri Giants.
