= Takahiro Matsunaga =

Japanese baseball player (born 1988)

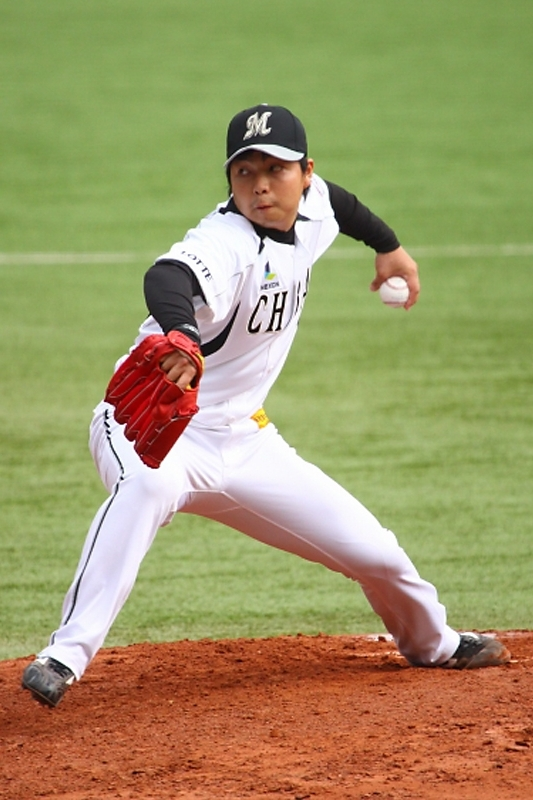
- Matsunaga with the Chiba Lotte Marines

Chiba Lotte Marines – No. 79
- Pitcher / Coach
- Born: April 16, 1988 (age 37); Ōkawa District, Kagawa
- Batted: Left Threw: Left

NPB debut
- March 29, 2013, for the Chiba Lotte Marines

Last NPB appearance
- July 31, 2020, for the Chiba Lotte Marines

Career statistics (through 2020 season)
- Win–loss record: 16–15
- Earned run average: 2.91
- Strikeouts: 238
- Saves: 1
- Holds: 135
- Stats at Baseball Reference

Teams
- As player: Chiba Lotte Marines (2013–2022); As coach: Chiba Lotte Marines (2023-)

Takahiro Matsunaga (松永 昂大, Matsunaga Takahiro) is a Japanese professional baseball pitcher. He was born on April 16, 1988. He is currently playing for the Chiba Lotte Marines of the NPB.

On October 10, 2018, he was selected to be part of the Japan national baseball team at the 2018 MLB Japan All-Star Series, but on November 1, 2018, he canceled his participation. On February 27, 2019, he was selected for Japan national baseball team at the 2019 exhibition games against Mexico.
