= Shintaro Fujinami =

Japanese baseball player (born 1994)

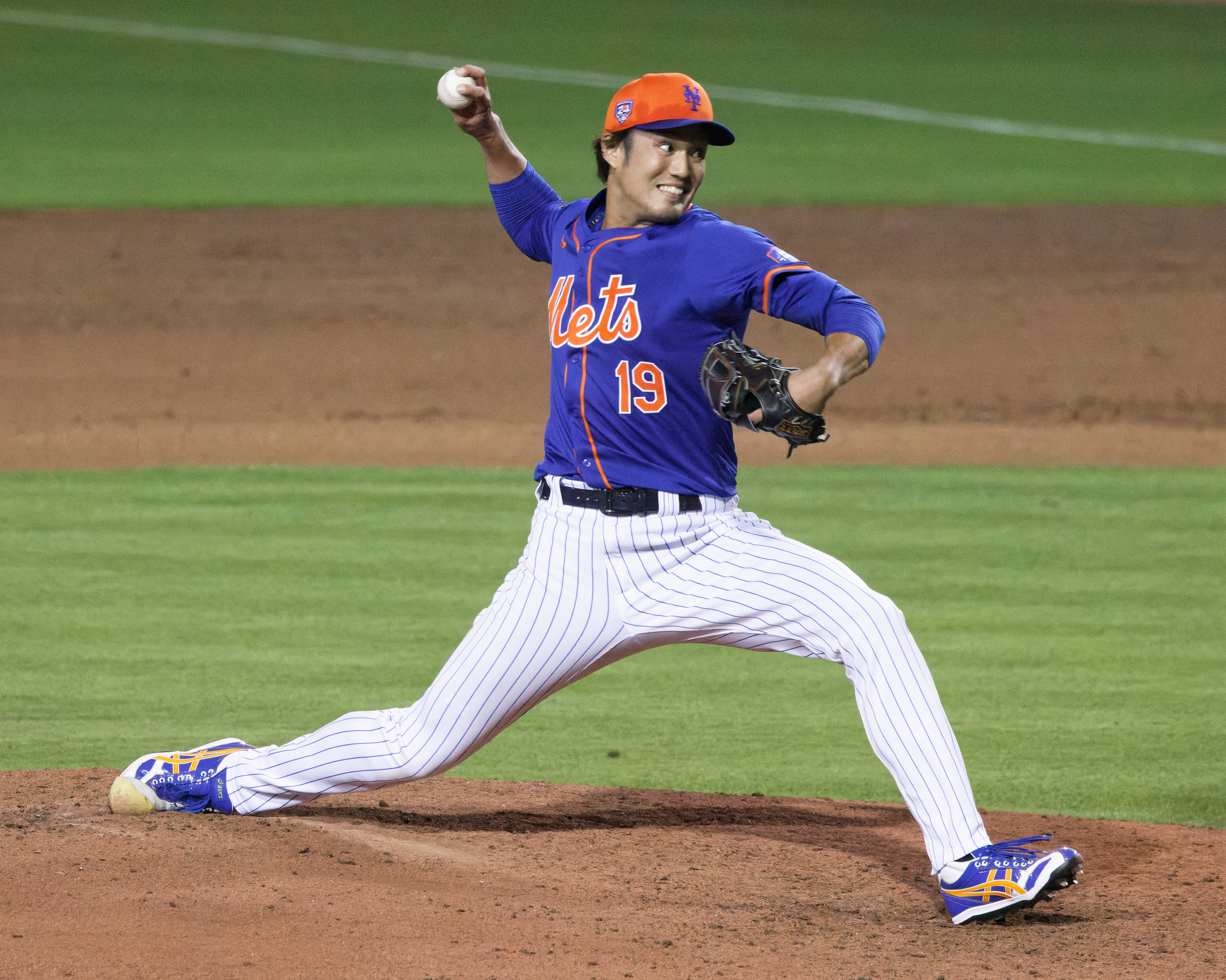
- Fujinami with the Mets in 2024

Orix Buffaloes
- Pitcher
- Born: April 12, 1994 (age 32); Sakai, Osaka, Japan
- Bats: Right Throws: Right

Professional debut
- NPB: March 31, 2013, for the Hanshin Tigers
- MLB: April 1, 2023, for the Oakland Athletics

NPB statistics (through August 18, 2026)
- Win–loss record: 58–54
- Earned run average: 3.44
- Strikeouts: 1,039

MLB statistics (through 2023 season)
- Win–loss record: 7–8
- Earned run average: 7.18
- Strikeouts: 83
- Stats at Baseball Reference

Teams
- Hanshin Tigers (2013–2022); Oakland Athletics (2023); Baltimore Orioles (2023); Yokohama DeNA BayStars (2025–2026)

Career highlights and awards
- 4× NPB All-Star (2013–2016); NPB All-Star Game MVP (2015 Game 1); Central League strikeout leader (2015)

Shintaro Fujinami (藤浪 晋太郎, Fujinami Shintarō; born April 12, 1994) is a Japanese professional baseball pitcher for the Orix Buffaloes of Nippon Professional Baseball (NPB). He has previously played in Major League Baseball (MLB) for the Oakland Athletics and Baltimore Orioles, and in NPB for the Hanshin Tigers and Yokohama DeNA BayStars.

== Amateur career ==
Fujinami started playing Little League Baseball for the Takeshirodai Club, then played for the Osaka Senboku Boys upon entering Miyayamadai Junior High, where he pitched as fast as 142 km/h (88 mph). He also pitched for the national team in the under-16 world championship in 2009. He graduated grade school at 180 cm (5 ft 11 in), and junior high at 194 cm (6 ft 4 1/2 in).

In 2010, Fujinami entered Osaka Toin High School. In his final year in 2012 he led Tōin as their ace pitcher at the Japanese High School Baseball Invitational Tournament and Japanese High School Baseball Championship, where the school won both competitions. During the Summer Koshien tournaments, he pitched two consecutive complete shutout games in both the semi-finals and finals (only surrendering two hits in each game), recorded the fastest pitch of 153 km/h (95 mph) and tied the tournament record for the most strike-outs in the finals match (14). He finished the tournament with a 1.07 ERA in 76 innings, and 90 strikeouts. In the fall, he again pitched for the national team in the 2012 18U Baseball World Championship, where he recorded a 1.11 ERA. He led the tournament with 24 1/3 innings pitched and 26 strikeouts, while issuing 8 walks, and was selected into the tournament's Best Nine. In addition, he received the 2012 MVP Award by the International Baseball Federation for the 18 and under category.

== Professional career ==
=== Hanshin Tigers ===
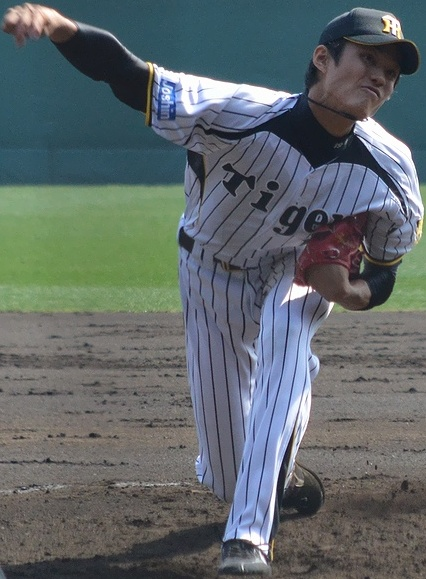
Fujinami with the Tigers in 2013

Fujinami was the number 1 pick of the Tigers, Buffaloes, Marines, and the Swallows in the 2012 Nippon Professional Baseball draft. Hanshin won the four-way lottery and assigned him jersey number 19.

==== 2013: rookie season ====
Fujinami made his NPB debut on March 31, 2013, the third game of the season and the earliest-ever appearance by a rookie drafted out of high school. He earned the loss, pitching six innings and allowing both runs in a 2–0 loss against the Tokyo Yakult Swallows. He struck out Akinori Iwamura in the bottom of the first inning for his first NPB strikeout.

Fujinami was due to make his second start on April 7 against the Hiroshima Toyo Carp but was replaced by Minoru Iwata, who was unable to pitch in the rained-out game the day before. Instead, he made his next appearance as a relief pitcher. He made his second start on April 14 against the Yokohama DeNA BayStars and recorded his first professional win, pitching six scoreless innings. Fujinami was the fifth pitcher drafted out of high school in NPB history to record his first pro victory the year after they won a Koshien tournament and the first in that group to also record their first pro victory at Koshien Stadium. He is also the first pitcher out of high school in franchise history to record their first pro victory at Koshien and the first Central League rookie out of high school to record ten or more victories in a season since Yutaka Enatsu in 1967.

Fujinami quickly gained popularity and was the third-highest vote getter amongst Central League starting pitchers for the 2013 NPB All-Star Series, trailing Kenta Maeda and Yasuhiro Ogawa. He started the second game of the All-Star series and pitched two scoreless innings. In the top of the sixth inning, he played a prank on Nippon Ham's Sho Nakata, a former senior at Osaka Tōin, by throwing 2 very slow balls over his head, which prompted Nakata to throw his bat and jokingly take a few steps toward the mound. Fujinami ended up striking out Nakata.

He finished his rookie year at 10–6, with 125 strikeouts and a 2.75 ERA in 23 starts.

==== 2014 ====
Fujinami pitched his first career complete game in a July 15 contest against the Dragons with a 13-strikeout effort and only a single run allowed. During a September 15 game against the Carp at Koshien, he hit 157 km/h (98 mph) on the radar gun and set a new personal high and tied the franchise high for velocity. Tomoyuki Kubota set the original record on June 21, 2005. Four days later, he earned his 10th victory of the season and became the first pitcher out of high school to record double-digit wins in his first two NPB seasons since Daisuke Matsuzaka in 1999–2000 (16 and 14 wins). The last pitcher to accomplish the feat in the Central League (and in franchise history) was Yutaka Enatsu in 1967–1968 (12 and 25 wins). In the same game, he recorded his sixth RBI of the season, tying Tetsuro Kawajiri's 1996 record of RBIs by a Hanshin pitcher.

Fujinami totaled 11 wins for the season, with an ERA of 3.53 and 172 strikeouts in 163 innings. His fastball averaged 149.7 km/h (93.0 mph), second only to Shohei Ohtani's 152.5 km/h among starters. Fujinami had an 8.2 percent swinging strike rate. While his cutter boasted an 18.7 percent swinging strike rate, his forkball generated an even higher rate of 26 percent, with batters hitting .222 off it. His 2.81 fielding independent pitching (FIP) was the best in the Central League, while his batting average on balls in play was .335, nearly 30 points above the league average.

==== 2015: strikeout leader ====
Fujinami led the league with 221 strikeouts, 7 complete games, and 4 shutouts in 2015. He had recorded just 2 complete games and no shutouts in his first two seasons. He finished tied for second in the league with 14 wins against just 7 losses. His 2.40 ERA ranked fifth in the Central League. He set several career bests in 2015, including wins, strikeouts, complete games, shutouts, 28 starts, 199 innings pitched, 2.40 ERA, and 10 strikeouts per 9 innings. He had a 32 inning scoreless streak from mid-May to early June, broken up by unearned runs.

==== 2016–2022: Decline, demotion to bullpen and minors ====
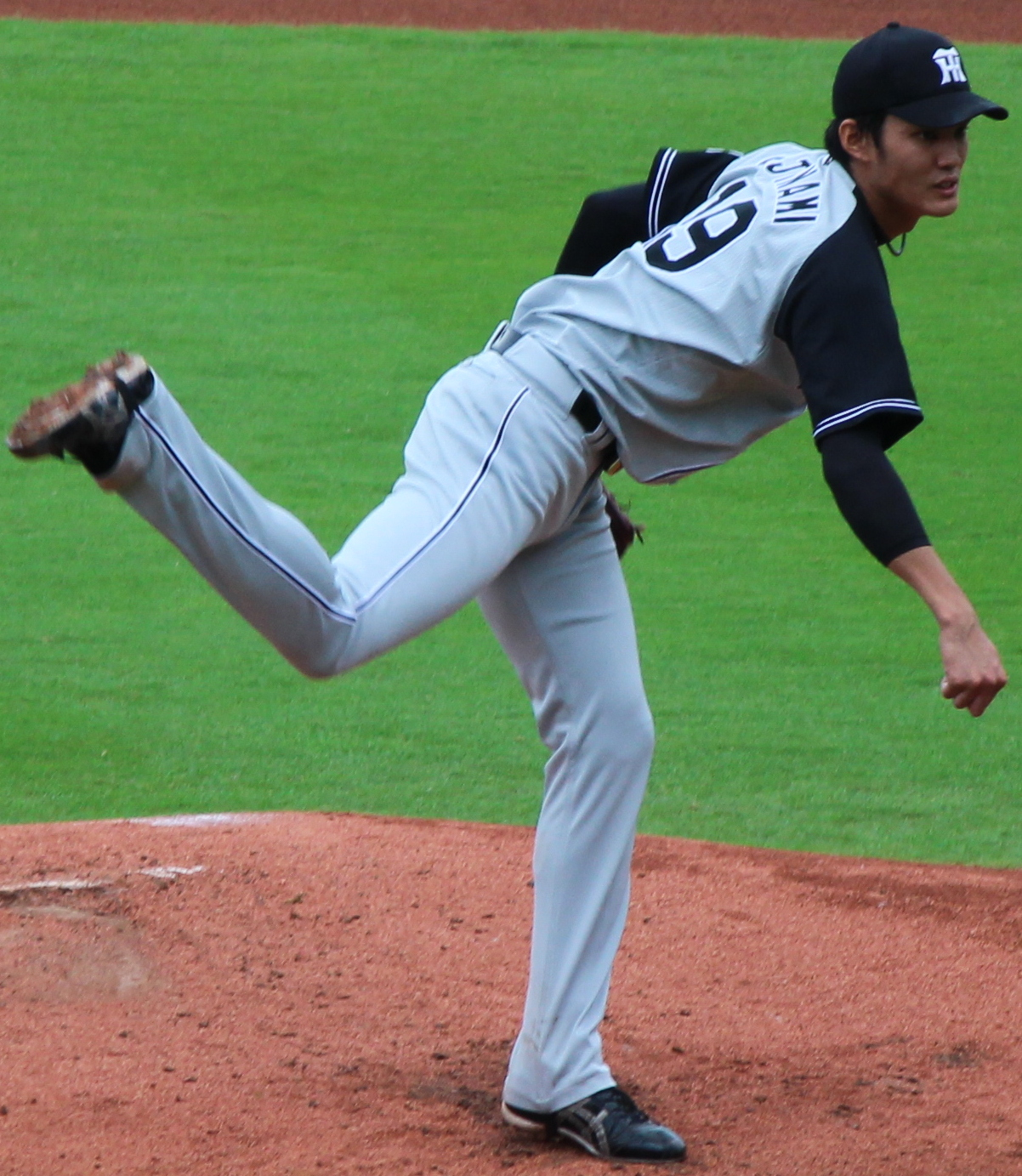
Fujinami with the Tigers in 2016

Fujinami's 2016 season was not as successful as his previous one. In 26 starts, he had just 7 wins against 11 losses with a 3.25 ERA. In 169 innings pitched, he allowed 152 hits, including a career-high 11 home runs. He recorded 176 strikeouts. He was selected to his fourth consecutive and final NPB All-Star Series roster.

In 2017, control became an even bigger issue, with Fujinami walking 6.9 batters every 9 innings. He was sent down to Hanshin's minor league team for the first time in his career. He finished the season with a 3–5 record and 4.28 ERA in 11 starts, less than half his total from the previous season. Because of his poor performance, he agreed to a reduced salary in 2018.

Fujinami split 2018 between the Central League and Western League minor league. On September 16, he hit a grand slam, the first by a pitcher in NPB since Balbino Gálvez in 1999, and earned his first win in almost three months.

Fujinami made only one appearance in the Central League in 2019, failing to finish the fifth inning while giving up 6 walks in a game in August. After the season, Fujinami called it the worst year of his career.

Fujinami announced he tested positive for COVID-19 on March 26, 2020, prior to the start of the shortened 2020 season. He tested positive after having dinner with more than a dozen people and was hospitalized for more than a week after his positive test. He apologized for attending the large gathering at a news conference on April 23. He again spent time in the minor leagues. In 24 games with Hanshin, 11 of them starts, he was 1–6 with a 4.01 ERA. On October 19, he set a new personal best by throwing a fastball at 162 kilometres per hour (101 mph).

In 2021, Fujinami made 6 starts and 15 relief appearances, going 3–3 with a 5.21 ERA. In his final season with Hanshin in 2022, he made 10 starts and 6 relief appearances. He was 3–5 with a 3.38 ERA, his most effective season since 2015. He was demoted to the bullpen after several rough starts at the beginning of the season, but returned to the rotation in August with a 3.09 ERA in seven starts. He recorded his 1,000th career strikeout in NPB on September 9.

On December 1, 2022, the Tigers posted Fujinami to Major League Baseball (MLB), giving teams 30 days to negotiate with him and paying Hanshin a compensatory fee if a deal was reached.

=== Oakland Athletics ===
On January 13, 2023, Fujinami signed a one-year, $3.25 million contract with the Oakland Athletics. After making four losing starts with 14.40 ERA with 12 strikeouts in 15 innings, Fujinami was moved to the bullpen. He fared better as a reliever, with a 3.32 ERA and 22 strikeouts in 21 2/3 innings in his final 20 games with the Athletics.

=== Baltimore Orioles ===
On July 19, 2023, the Athletics traded Fujinami to the Baltimore Orioles for pitcher Easton Lucas. In his Orioles debut on July 21, Fujinami allowed a leadoff first-pitch homer to José Siri in a 3–0 loss to the Tampa Bay Rays. Fujinami pitched a perfect tenth inning to earn his first MLB save in a 5–3 win over the Seattle Mariners on August 13. He earned his second save against the Los Angeles Angels on September 5, inducing a fly ball and striking out two batters in the tenth inning of a 5–4 Orioles win. He was left off Baltimore's postseason roster. In 30 appearances for Baltimore, Fujinami had a 4.85 ERA with 32 strikeouts across 29 2/3 innings. He became a free agent following the season on November 2.

=== New York Mets ===
On February 14, 2024, Fujinami signed a one-year, $3.35 million contract with the New York Mets. He was optioned to the Triple-A Syracuse Mets to begin the season. He suffered a right shoulder strain, was placed on the injured list on May 13, then on June 5 transferred to the 60-day injured list. Fujinami was activated from the injured list and subsequently designated for assignment by the Mets on July 26. He cleared waivers and was sent outright to Syracuse on July 30. In the minors, he pitched better following his outright assignment, with a 4.05 ERA and 24 strikeouts in 24 innings in the final two months of the season, compared to an 8.27 ERA through the end of July.

Fujinami elected free agency on October 31. He pitched for the Gigantes de Carolina in the Puerto Rican winter league, hoping to post better results as he worked back from his shoulder injury. Fujinami logged a 3.05 ERA in 6 starts, with 24 strikeouts and 11 walks in 20 2/3 innings.

=== Seattle Mariners ===
On January 17, 2025, Fujinami signed a minor league contract with the Seattle Mariners that included a spring training invitation. He would earn $1.35 million if he played in the majors. In 21 appearances for the Triple-A Tacoma Rainiers, he posted a 2–1 record and 5.79 ERA with 24 strikeouts across 18 2/3 innings pitched. Fujinami was released by the Mariners organization on June 17.

=== Yokohama DeNA BayStars ===
On July 15, 2025, Fujinami signed with the Yokohama DeNA BayStars of Nippon Professional Baseball.

=== Orix Buffaloes ===
On November 17, 2026, Fujinami signed with the Orix Buffaloes of Nippon Professional Baseball.

== International career ==
Fujinami has pitched for Samurai Japan, first starring as a youth pitcher in the 2009 under-16 world championship and 2012 under-18 world championship.

He played for Japan in the 2014 MLB Japan All-Star Series and 2017 World Baseball Classic. He pitched once in the 2017 tournament, striking out four while walking one and hitting a batter in a win over China.

== Pitching style ==
Fujinami has a large frame, listed at 6 ft 6 in and 215 lb. With a three-quarters delivery, he throws a fastball topping out at 102.6 mph, a splitter, and a solid mid-to-high 80s slider. The splitter has a high whiff rate in his arsenal. However, Fujinami struggles with control. In ten seasons in NPB, he allowed 4.2 walks per 9 innings pitched. His walk rate worsened to 5.1 per 9 innings in MLB in 2023.

== Personal life ==
Growing up, Fujinami and his father Susumu were avid fans of the Yomiuri Giants.

Fujinami learned to swim when he was two years old and swam competitively through junior high school.

Fujinami began playing guitar in 2014, bringing a guitar with him to a pre-season training camp in 2015.

In 2023, Fujinami brought trainer Issei Kamada with him to the United States as his interpreter. In Oakland, they lived within walking distance of each other. Kamada was initially introduced as "Yamada" at an Athletics press conference.
