= Kōji Fukutani =

Japanese baseball player (born 1991)

Kōji Fukutani 福谷 浩司
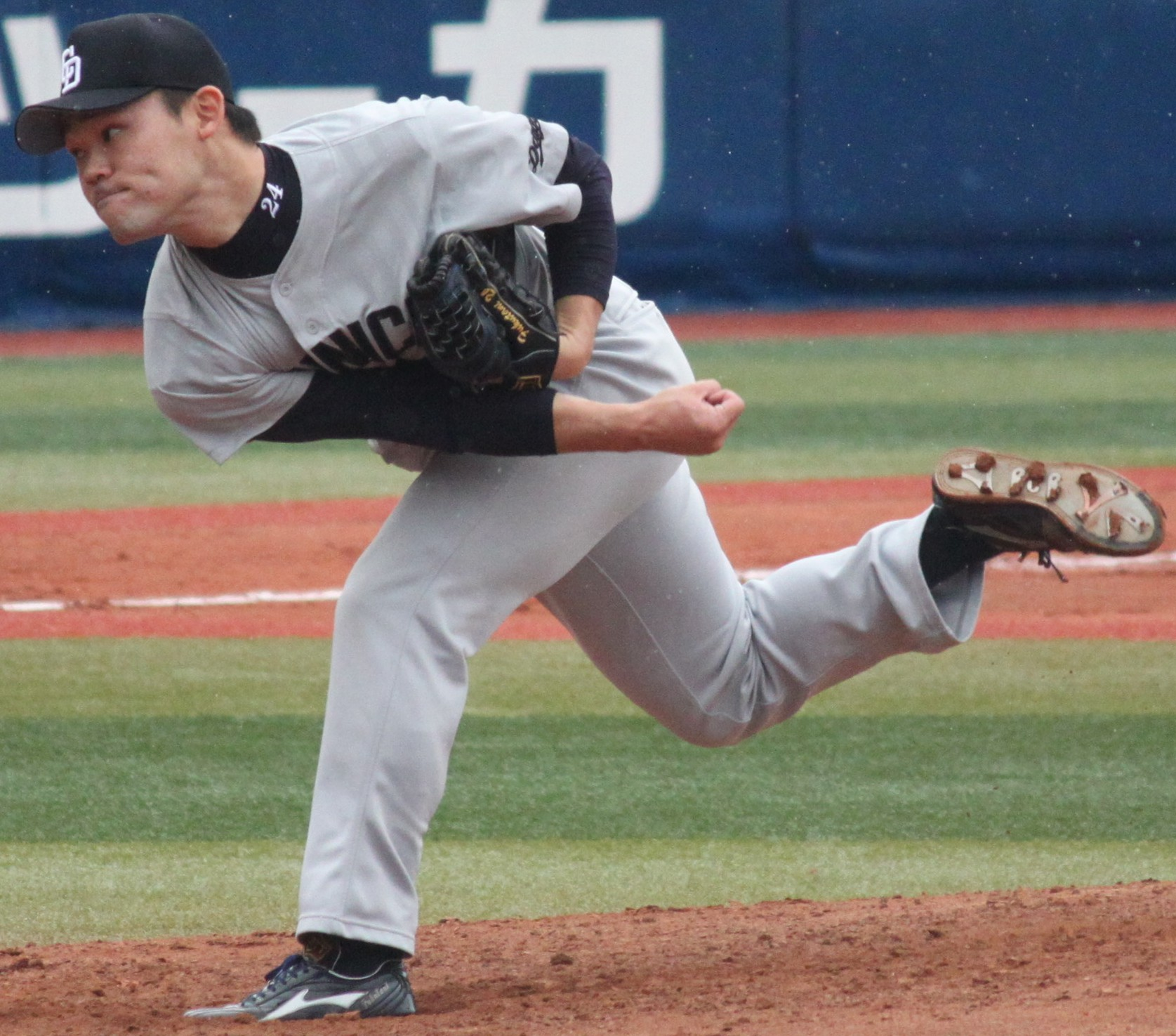
- Fukutani with the Chunichi Dragons

Kiwoom Heroes
- Pitcher
- Born: January 9, 1991 (age 35); Chita, Aichi, Japan
- Bats: Right Throws: Right

NPB debut
- June 8, 2013, for the Chunichi Dragons

NPB statistics (through 2024 season)
- Win-loss: 27–33
- ERA: 4.04
- Strikeouts: 395
- Saves: 38
- Holds: 54
- Stats at Baseball Reference

Teams
- Chunichi Dragons (2013–2024); Hokkaido Nippon Ham Fighters (2025–2026); Kiwoom Heroes (2027–present)

Career highlights and awards
- 1× NPB All-Star (2014)

Kōji Fukutani (福谷 浩司, Fukutani Kōji; born January 9, 1991) is a Japanese professional baseball pitcher for the Hokkaido Nippon Ham Fighters of Nippon Professional Baseball (NPB).

He joined the Fighters as a free agent after spending 11 years with the Chunichi Dragons.
