= Shunta Wakamatsu =

Japanese baseball player

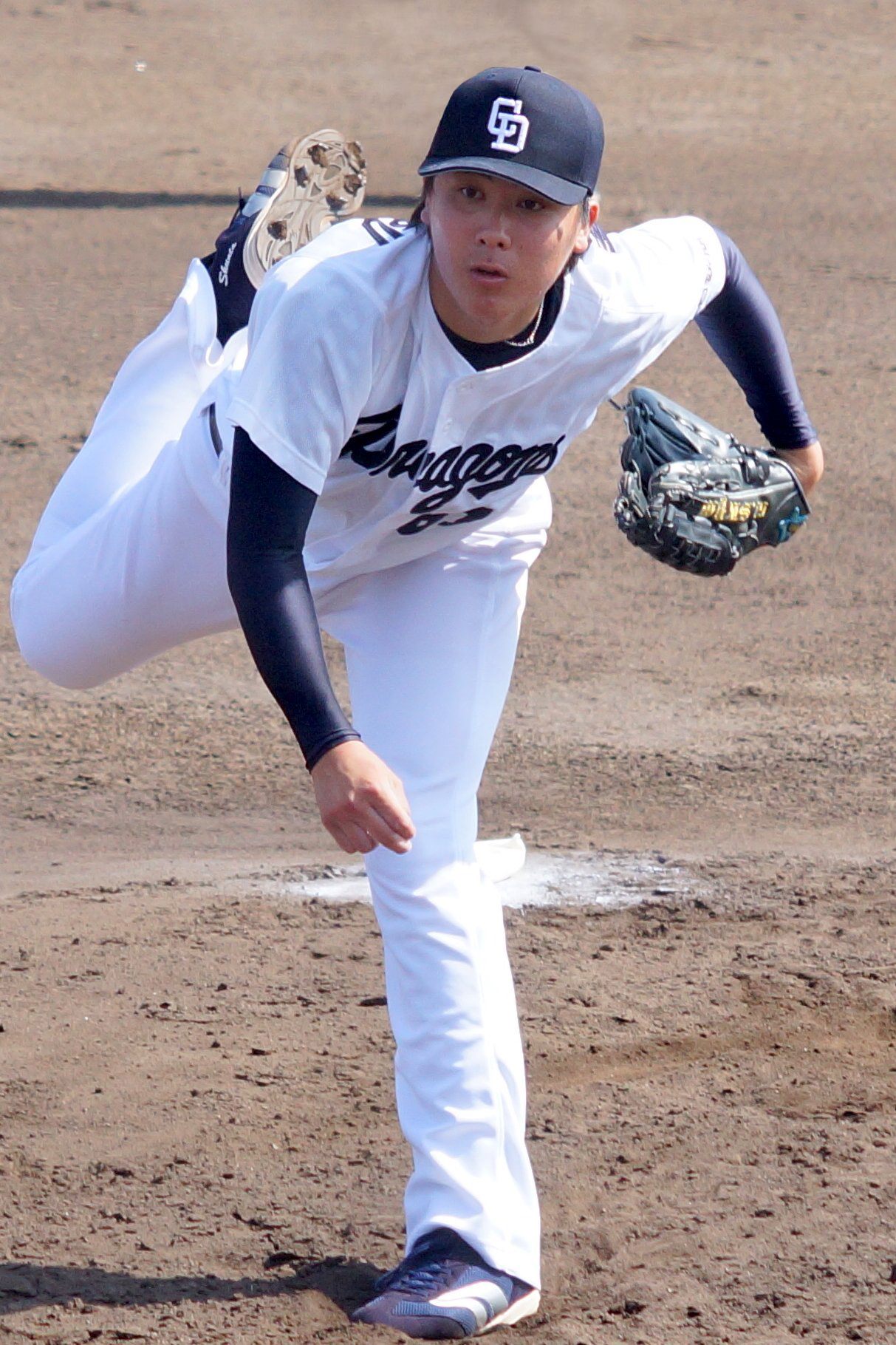
- Wakamatsu with the Chunichi Dragons

Tochigi Golden Braves – No. 61
- Pitcher
- Born: February 28, 1995 (age 31); Fukuoka, Japan
- Bats: Right Throws: Right

debut
- April 3, 2014, for the Chunichi Dragons

NPB statistics (through 2018)
- Win-Loss: 18–17
- ERA: 3.40
- Strikeouts: 219
- Stats at Baseball Reference

Teams
- Chunichi Dragons (2013–2018); Tochigi Golden Braves (2019–2020); Fukushima Red Hopes (2021–2024)

Shunta Wakamatsu (若松 駿太, Wakamatsu Shunta; born February 28, 1995 in Kurume, Fukuoka, Japan) is a retired professional Japanese baseball player. He played pitcher for the Tochigi Golden Braves and Fukushima Red Hopes in the Baseball Challenge League. He previously played for the Chunichi Dragons in Nippon Professional Baseball.
