= List of current foreign CPBL players =

In the CPBL, players born outside of Taiwan are often known as international players. This list includes all international players who are currently on CPBL extended rosters and thus eligible to play in the CPBL or in the CPBL 2. As the league has a limit on foreign players in each organization (maximum of four foreign players at any given time), there are currently 28 active players on CPBL rosters.

List is accurate as of April 5, 2025:

Pos	P	Pitcher	C	Catcher	IF	Infielder	OF	Outfielder
BOLD	Denotes players with at least one appearance in an international tournament							

Nationality	Birthplace (if different)	Player	Team	Pos.	Career	Last non-CPBL Team
Canada	—	Brock Dykxhoorn	Uni-President Lions	P	2020– (UNI)	(South Korea) Lotte Giants
Colombia	—	Jasier Herrera	Wei Chuan Dragons	P	2024– (WEI)	(Japan) Saitama Seibu Lions
Cuba	—	Roenis Elías	Fubon Guardians	P	2025– (FUB)	(South Korea) SSG Landers
Dominican Republic	—	Cristopher Crisostomo	Uni-President Lions	P	2025– (UNI)	(Japan) Chiba Lotte Marines
Dominican Republic	—	José de Paula	CTBC Brothers	P	2020– (CTB)	(Mexico) Bravos de León
Dominican Republic	—	Pedro Fernandez	Rakuten Monkeys	P	2023– (RAK)	(United States) Nashville Sounds
Dominican Republic	Puerto Rico	Steven Moya	TSG Hawks	OF	2024– {TSG)	(United States) Gastonia Honey Hunters
Dominican Republic	—	Félix Peña	Uni-President Lions	P	2025– (UNI)	(South Korea) Hanwha Eagles
Japan	—	Ryo Negishi	Fubon Guardians	P	2025– (FUB)	(Japan) Ibaraki Astro Planets
Japan	—	Isaki Ninomiya	Fubon Guardians	P	2025– (FUB)	(Japan) Kufu Hayate Ventures
Japan	—	Kento Onodera	TSG Hawks	P	2024– (TSG)	(Japan) Saitama Musashi Heat Bears
Japan	—	Shuto Sakurai	TSG Hawks	P	2025– (TSG)	(Japan) Tohoku Rakuten Golden Eagles
Japan	—	Kazumasa Yoshida	TSG Hawks	P	2024– (TSG)	(Japan) Oisix Niigata Albirex
Mexico	—	Humberto Castellanos	CTBC Brothers	P	2025– (CTB)	(United States) Reno Aces
Mexico	—	Marcelo Martinez	Rakuten Monkeys	P	2024– (RAK)	(Mexico) Sultanes de Monterrey
Puerto Rico	—	Jonathan Bermúdez	Rakuten Monkeys	P	2025– (RAK)	(United States) Jacksonville Jumbo Shrimp
United States	—	Tyler Eppler	Wei Chuan Dragons	P	2023 (FUB); 2024– (WEI)	(Mexico) Sultanes de Monterrey
United States	—	Drew Gagnon	Wei Chuan Dragons	P	2021– (WEI)	(South Korea) Kia Tigers
United States	—	Rio Gomez	Fubon Guardians	P	2024 (WEI); 2025– (FUB)	(United States) Worcester Red Sox
United States	—	Bradin Hagens	TSG Hawks	P	2021–2023 (RAK); 2024– {TSG)	(United States) Fargo-Moorhead RedHawks
United States	—	Aaron Leasher	Wei Chuan Dragons	P	2024 (FUB); 2025– (WEI)	(United States) Staten Island FerryHawks
United States	—	Zac Lowther	Wei Chuan Dragons	P	2025– (WEI)	(Mexico) Toros de Tijuana
United States	—	Shawn Morimando	Fubon Guardians	P	2021–2024 (CTB); 2025– (FUB)	(South Korea) SSG Landers
United States	—	Eric Stout	TSG Hawks	P	2023–2024 (CTB); 2025– (TSG)	(South Korea) Kia Tigers
United States	—	Beau Sulser	Rakuten Monkeys	P	2025– (RAK)	(United States) Indianapolis Indians
United States	—	Spenser Watkins	TSG Hawks	P	2025– (TSG)	(United States) Rochester Red Wings
United States	—	Joe Wieland	Uni-President Lions	P	2025– (UNI)	(Mexico) Olmecas de Tabasco
United States	—	Bryan Woodall	Wei Chuan Dragons	P	2015–2017 (CTB); 2018–2020 (FUB); 2021– (WEI)	(United States) Lancaster Barnstormers
Venezuela	—	Enderson Franco	Fubon Guardians	P	2022– (FUB)	(Mexico) Generales de Durango
Venezuela	—	Yohander Méndez	Uni-President Lions	P	2025– (UNI)	(Japan) Yomiuri Giants
Venezuela	—	Nivaldo Rodríguez	CTBC Brothers	P	2024 (FUB); 2025– (CTB)	(Mexico) Sultanes de Monterrey
Venezuela	—	Mario Sanchez	CTBC Brothers	P	2023–2024 (UNI); 2025– (CTB)	(South Korea) Kia Tigers
