= Shī (surname) =

Chinese family name

Shī (施) is a Chinese surname. It is written as Sze or Sy in Cantonese or Hokkien romanisation. According to a 2013 study it was the 106th most common name, being shared by 2.06 million people or 0.150% of the population, with Jiangsu being the province with the most people. It is 23rd on the Hundred Family Surnames, contained in the verse 何呂施張 (He Lü Shi Zhang).

In Vietnamese is it written Thi.

== Notable people ==
- Shi Lang (施琅, 1621–1696), Marquis Jinghai, a Chinese admiral who served under the Ming and Qing dynasties, helped conquer Taiwan
- Shi Hairong (施海荣)
- Shi Haoran, (施浩然), a Chinese swimmer who competed for Team China at the 2008 Summer Olympics
- Shi Yiguang (施夷光), better known as Xi Shi (西施), one of the renowned Four Beauties of ancient China.
- Shi Jianqiao (施剑翘), the daughter of the Chinese military officer Shi Congbin, whose killing she avenged by assassinating the former warlord Sun Chuanfang
- Shi Tingmao (施廷懋), a Chinese diver representing Chongqing diving team
- Shih Wing-ching (施永青), a Hong Kong businessman
- Shi Zhecun (施蛰存), a Chinese author and journal editor in Shanghai during the 1930s
- Shi Zhongheng (施仲衡), a Chinese engineer and academician
- Shih Chih-ming (施治明), a Taiwanese politician of the Kuomintang party
- Shih Chin-tien (施金典), a Taiwanese baseball player who currently plays for Uni-President Lions of Chinese Professional Baseball League
- Shih Ming-teh (施明德), political activist in Taiwan and was once a political prisoner for 25-and-a-half years
- Simon Min Sze (施敏), electrical engineer who invented the floating-gate MOSFET with Dawon Kahng
- Henry Sy (施至成), former richest taipan billionaire in the Philippines
