= 2025 CPBL season =

Professional baseball season

- League: Chinese Professional Baseball League
- Sport: Baseball
- Duration: March 29 to October 6 (Regular Season)
- Teams: 6

First half-season
- Season champions: Uni-President Lions

Second half-season
- Season champions: CTBC Brothers

Full season
- Season champions: CTBC Brothers

Taiwan Series
- Champions: Rakuten Monkeys
- Runners-up: CTBC Brothers
- Finals MVP: Pedro Fernandez

CPBL seasons
- ← 2024 2026 →

The 2025 Chinese Professional Baseball League season was the 36th season of the Chinese Professional Baseball League (CPBL), based in Taiwan.

== Season schedule ==
The regular season began on 29 March 2025. Teams will play a split-season, with second-half games starting July 4. The CPBL All-Star Game is scheduled for the weekend of July 19–20.

== Standings ==
=== First half standings ===
Team	G	W	T	L	Pct.	GB
Uni-President Lions	60	36	0	24	.600	—
CTBC Brothers	60	34	0	26	.567	2
Rakuten Monkeys	60	30	0	30	.500	6
TSG Hawks	60	30	0	30	.483	6
Wei Chuan Dragons	60	29	0	31	.433	7
Fubon Guardians	60	21	0	39	.383	15

=== Second half standings ===
Team	G	W	T	L	Pct.	GB
CTBC Brothers	60	36	0	24	.600	—
Rakuten Monkeys	60	32	1	27	.542	3½
Uni-President Lions	60	30	0	30	.500	6
TSG Hawks	60	29	2	29	.500	6
Wei Chuan Dragons	60	26	1	33	.441	9½
Fubon Guardians	60	25	0	35	.417	11

=== Final season standings ===
Team	G	W	T	L	Pct.	GB
CTBC Brothers	120	70	0	50	.583	—
Uni-President Lions	120	66	0	54	.550	4
Rakuten Monkeys	120	62	1	57	.521	7½
TSG Hawks	120	59	2	59	.500	10
Wei Chuan Dragons	120	55	1	64	.462	14½
Fubon Guardians	120	46	0	74	.383	24

- Green denotes first-half or second-half champion.
- Yellow denotes clinching playoff qualification as the wild card.

== Playoffs ==
2025 CPBL playoff series			2025 Taiwan Series
			1	CTBC Brothers	1
2	Uni-President Lions	2	2	Rakuten Monkeys	4
3	Rakuten Monkeys	3

=== CPBL Playoff Series ===
The team that won a half starts with a one-win advantage over the team with the best record among non-half winners.

Rakuten Monkeys won the series, 3−2.

Game	Date	Score	Location	Time	Attendance
1	October 10	Rakuten Monkeys – 1, Uni-President Lions – 2	Chengcing Lake Baseball Stadium	2:44	13,124
2	October 11	Uni-President Lions – 6, Rakuten Monkeys– 7	Rakuten Taoyuan Baseball Stadium	3:23	18,000
3	October 12	Rakuten Monkeys – 9, Uni-President Lions – 3	Chengcing Lake Baseball Stadium	3:11	11,102
4	October 13	Rakuten Monkeys – 4, Uni-President Lions – 3	Chengcing Lake Baseball Stadium	3:12	8,258

=== Taiwan Series ===
Rakuten Monkeys won the series, 4−1.

Game	Date	Score	Location	Time	Attendance
1	October 18	Rakuten Monkeys – 3, CTBC Brothers – 0	Taipei Dome	2:34	40,000
2	October 19	Rakuten Monkeys – 2, CTBC Brothers – 1	Taipei Dome	2:54	40,000
3	October 21	CTBC Brothers – 2, Rakuten Monkeys – 0	Taipei Dome	2:37	37,088
4	October 26	CTBC Brothers – 1, Rakuten Monkeys – 3	Rakuten Taoyuan Baseball Stadium	2:43	18,000
5	October 27	Rakuten Monkeys – 9, CTBC Brothers – 7	Taichung Intercontinental Baseball Stadium	4:05	18,307

== See also ==
- 2025 in baseball
- 2025 Major League Baseball season
- 2025 KBO League season
- 2025 Nippon Professional Baseball season
- 2025 Mexican League season
- 2025 Frontier League season
- 2025 Pioneer League season
