= 2024 CPBL season =

Professional baseball season

35th CPBL season
- League: Chinese Professional Baseball League
- Sport: Baseball
- Duration: March 29 to October 11 (Regular Season)
- Teams: 6

First half-season
- Season champions: Uni-President Lions

Second half-season
- Season champions: CTBC Brothers

Full season
- Season champions: CTBC Brothers

Taiwan Series
- Champions: CTBC Brothers
- Runners-up: Uni-President Lions
- Finals MVP: Tseng Sung-en

CPBL seasons
- ← 2023 2025 →

The 2024 Chinese Professional Baseball League season was the 35th season of the Chinese Professional Baseball League (CPBL), based in Taiwan.

== Season schedule ==
The regular season began on 30 March 2024. Teams will play a split-season, with second-half games starting July 5. The CPBL All-Star Game is scheduled for the weekend of July 20–21.

On August 23, the Chinese Professional Baseball League officially drew over 2 million spectators during the regular season, the first time that the milestone had been reached in league history.

== Standings ==
=== First half standings ===
Team	G	W	T	L	Pct.	GB
Uni-President Lions	60	37	0	23	.617	—
Rakuten Monkeys	60	33	0	27	.550	4
CTBC Brothers	60	32	0	28	.533	5
Fubon Guardians	60	29	0	31	.483	8
Wei Chuan Dragons	60	26	0	34	.433	11
TSG Hawks	60	23	0	37	.383	14

=== Second half standings ===
Team	G	W	T	L	Pct.	GB
CTBC Brothers	60	38	0	22	.633	—
Wei Chuan Dragons	60	32	0	28	.533	6
Uni-President Lions	60	29	1	30	.492	8½
Rakuten Monkeys	60	29	1	30	.492	8½
TSG Hawks	60	26	1	33	.441	11½
Fubon Guardians	60	24	1	35	.407	13½

=== Final season standings ===
Team	G	W	T	L	Pct.	GB
CTBC Brothers	120	70	0	50	.583	—
Uni-President Lions	120	66	1	53	.555	3½
Rakuten Monkeys	120	62	1	57	.521	7½
Wei Chuan Dragons	120	58	0	62	.483	12
Fubon Guardians	120	53	1	66	.445	16½
TSG Hawks	120	49	1	70	.412	20½

- Green denotes first-half or second-half champion.
- Yellow denotes clinching playoff qualification as the wild card.

== Playoffs ==
2024 CPBL playoff series			2024 Taiwan Series
			1	CTBC Brothers	4
2	Uni-President Lions	3	2	Uni-President Lions	1
3	Rakuten Monkeys	1

=== CPBL Playoff Series ===
The team that won a half starts with a one-win advantage over the team with the best record among non-half winners.

Uni-President Lions won the series, 3−1.

Game	Date	Score	Location	Time	Attendance
1	October 12	Rakuten Monkeys – 1, Uni-President Lions – 2	Tainan Municipal Baseball Stadium	2:43	15,209
2	October 13	Uni-President Lions – 1, Rakuten Monkeys– 17	Rakuten Taoyuan Baseball Stadium	3:14	12,520
3	October 14	Rakuten Monkeys – 5, Uni-President Lions – 8	Tainan Municipal Baseball Stadium	3:24	7,214

=== Taiwan Series ===
CTBC Brothers won the series, 4−1.

Game	Date	Score	Location	Time	Attendance
1	October 19	Uni-President Lions – 4, CTBC Brothers – 10	Taipei Dome	3:33	40,000
2	October 20	Uni-President Lions – 10, CTBC Brothers – 3	Taipei Dome	3:30	37,596
3	October 22	CTBC Brothers – 10, Uni-President Lions – 0	Taipei Dome	3:37	25,029
4	October 23	CTBC Brothers – 6, Uni-President Lions – 4	Tainan Municipal Baseball Stadium	3:02	10,000
5	October 25	Uni-President Lions – 1, CTBC Brothers – 4	Taichung Intercontinental Baseball Stadium	2:50	20,000

== Attendances ==
The previous season, the total CPBL attendance was 1,800,130.

#	Team	Average attendance
1	CTBC Brothers	10,098
2	Wei Chuan Dragons	8,041
3	Fubon Guardians	7,307
4	Rakuten Monkeys	7,286
5	TSG Hawks	7,012
6	Uni-President Lions	6,360

== See also ==
- 2024 in baseball
- 2024 Major League Baseball season
- 2024 KBO League season
- 2024 Nippon Professional Baseball season
- 2024 Mexican League season
- 2024 Frontier League season
- 2024 Pioneer League season
