= Screwball =

Baseball and fastpitch softball pitch

A screwball, also called a scroogie, is a baseball and fastpitch softball pitch that is thrown so as to break in the opposite direction of a slider or curveball. Depending on the pitcher's arm angle, the ball may also have a sinking action. The pitch is rarely used in 21st century baseball because of a belief that it was hard on the arm, and its replacement with other off-speed pitches. The last starting pitcher to regularly use a screwball was Fernando Valenzuela, who played in the 1980s and 1990s.

Carl Hubbell was one of the most renowned screwball pitchers in the history of Major League Baseball. Hubbell was known as the "scroogie king" for his mastery of the pitch and the frequency with which he threw it. Other famous screwball hurlers include Tug McGraw, inaugural Hall of Fame member Christy Mathewson, and Cy Young Award winners Mike Cuellar, Fernando Valenzuela, Mike Marshall, and Willie Hernández. Also Sloppy Thurston who became the fifth pitcher in major-league history to pitch an immaculate inning.

== Grip and action ==
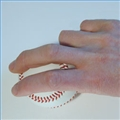
The grip used for a screwball

The baseball is held with the open end of the horseshoe shape (where the seams are closest together) facing upward. The thumb is placed just beneath the bottom of the horseshoe, the index finger is curled against the top of the thumb, forming a tight circle to the side of the ball. The middle finger is then placed on the top of the ball and grips against the top seam, (the seam closest to the index finger). The ring finger is placed outside the other top seam loosely and the pinky is held on the side opposite the thumb; all fingers are spread apart. The grip is similar to the circle changeup, but with different placement in regards to the seams.

Also, unlike the circle change, when throwing the screwball the middle finger applies the most pressure to the baseball, while the ring and pinky exert no pressure at all. For left-handed pitchers, as the middle finger presses hard down on the ball, their hand pronates (turns) inwardly in a clockwise manner near the end of the pitching motion, until much of the hand is beneath the ball. Conversely, right-handed pitchers turn their hand counter-clockwise.

== Effects ==
When thrown by a right-handed pitcher, a screwball breaks from left to right from the point of view of the pitcher; the pitch therefore moves down and in on a right-handed batter and down and away from a left-handed batter. When thrown by a left-handed pitcher, a screwball breaks from right to left, moving down and in on a left-handed batter and down and away from a right-handed batter. Due to this left-to-right movement of the ball (when thrown by a right-handed pitcher), right-handed pitchers use a screwball against left-handed batters in the same way that they use a slider against right-handed batters. If thrown correctly, the screwball breaks in the opposite direction of a curveball.

== Notable screwball pitchers ==
One of the first great screwball pitchers was Christy Mathewson, who pitched for the New York Giants 1900–1916, whose pitch was then labeled as the "fadeaway". Major league pitchers who have thrown the screwball during their careers include:

- Luis Arroyo
- Jack Baldschun
- Cy Blanton
- Dallas Braden
- Harry Brecheen
- Jim Brewer
- Tom Browning
- Paul Byrd
- Bobby Castillo (taught the pitch to Valenzuela)
- Keith Comstock
- Mike Cuellar
- Yu Darvish
- Rich Folkers
- John Franco
- Rubén Gómez
- Clark Griffith
- Willie Hernández
- Daniel Ray Herrera
- Teddy Higuera
- Brent Honeywell Jr.
- Carl Hubbell
- Jen-Lei Liao
- Juan Marichal
- Mike Marshall
- Christy Mathewson
- Tug McGraw
- Jim Mecir
- Masanori Murakami
- Mike Norris
- Mel Parnell
- Nelson Potter
- Hector Santiago
- Yoshinori Tateyama
- Sloppy Thurston
- Fernando Valenzuela
