= Travis Banwart =

American baseball player (born 1986)

- Pitcher
- Born: February 14, 1986 (age 40); Wichita, Kansas, U.S.
- Batted: Right Threw: Right

Professional debut
- KBO: July 12, 2014, for the SK Wyverns
- CPBL: August 31, 2019, for the Fubon Guardians

Last appearance
- KBO: September 29, 2016, for the KT Wiz
- CPBL: October 1, 2019, for the Fubon Guardians

KBO statistics
- Win–loss record: 20–17
- Earned run average: 4.92
- Strikeouts: 198

CPBL statistics
- Win–loss record: 1–4
- Earned run average: 6.30
- Strikeouts: 29
- Stats at Baseball Reference

Teams
- SK Wyverns (2014–2015); KT Wiz (2016); Fubon Guardians (2019)

Travis Jordan Banwart (born February 14, 1986) is an American former professional baseball starting pitcher. He played in the KBO League for the SK Wyverns and KT Wiz, and in the Chinese Professional Baseball League (CPBL) for the Fubon Guardians.

== Career ==
=== Amateur ===
Banwart attended Goddard High School and Wichita State University. In 2006, he played collegiate summer baseball for the Wareham Gatemen of the Cape Cod Baseball League, and was named a league all-star. He was drafted by the Oakland Athletics in the 4th round of the 2007 Major League Baseball draft.

=== Oakland Athletics ===
He made his professional debut with the Kane County Cougars in 2007, going 2–1 with a save and a 2.60 ERA, walking 10 in 45 innings. He split 2008 between Kane County and the Stockton Ports. In 2009, he was 10–5 with a 4.89 ERA for the Midland RockHounds and appeared in a game with the Triple-A Sacramento River Cats.

In 2010, Banwart played for Double-A Midland, Triple-A Sacramento, and the Phoenix Desert Dogs of the Arizona Fall League. 2011 was his first full year at Triple-A; he went 9–9 with a 4.63 ERA. He had a 9–5 record and a 3.85 ERA for the 2012 River Cats. In 2013, he was 10–5 with a 4.60 ERA in 29 games (23 starts) for Sacramento.

=== Cleveland Indians ===
On November 4, 2013, Banwart chose to become a free agent and on December 13 he signed with the Cleveland Indians.

=== KBO League ===
Banwart signed with SK Wyverns of the KBO League in July 2014. He pitched for the Wyverns for two seasons, and moved to the KT Wiz in 2016.

=== Cleveland Indians (second stint) ===
On December 16, 2016, Banwart signed a minor league contract with the Cleveland Indians organization. In 18 games (10 starts) split between the Double–A Akron RubberDucks and Triple–A Columbus Clippers, Banwart registered a 3–5 record and 5.54 ERA with 33 strikeouts in 50 1/3 innings pitched. He elected free agency following the season on November 6, 2017.

=== Wichita Wingnuts ===
On March 21, 2018, Banwart signed with the Wichita Wingnuts of the independent American Association.

=== Cleburne Railroaders ===
He was traded on October 5, 2018, to the Cleburne Railroaders for cash considerations.

=== Pericos de Puebla ===
On January 23, 2019, Banwart's contract was purchased by the Pericos de Puebla of the Mexican League. He was released on May 26, 2019.

=== Long Island Ducks ===
On June 7, 2019, Banwart signed with the Long Island Ducks of the Atlantic League of Professional Baseball.

=== Fubon Guardians ===
On July 16, 2019, Banwart's contract was purchased by the Fubon Guardians of the Chinese Professional Baseball League. He was promoted to the active roster on August 24 after Bryan Woodall was released. In 6 starts for Fubon, Banwart struggled to a 1-4 record and 6.30 ERA with 29 strikeouts across 30 innings pitched. He became a free agent following the season.

=== Long Island Ducks (second stint) ===
On March 11, 2020, Banwart signed with the Long Island Ducks of the Atlantic League. He did not play a game for the team because of the cancellation of the ALPB season due to the COVID-19 pandemic and became a free agent after the year.
