= Luis de los Santos (first baseman) =

Dominican baseball player (born 1966)

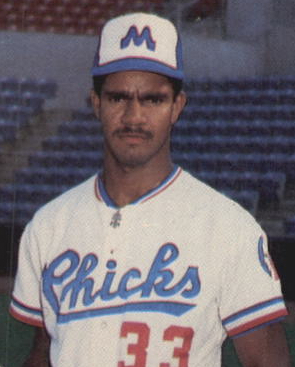
- de los Santos with the Memphis Chicks c. 1986

TSG Hawks – No. 23
- First baseman / Coach
- Born: December 29, 1966 (age 59); San Cristóbal, Dominican Republic
- Batted: Right Threw: Right

Professional debut
- MLB: September 7, 1988, for the Kansas City Royals
- CPBL: March 15, 1994, for the Brother Elephants
- NPB: April 4, 1997, for the Yomiuri Giants

Last appearance
- MLB: May 28, 1991, for the Detroit Tigers
- CPBL: October 11, 1996, for the Brother Elephants
- NPB: June 5, 1997, for the Yomiuri Giants

MLB statistics
- Batting average: .209
- Home runs: 0
- Runs batted in: 7

CPBL statistics
- Batting average: .362
- Home runs: 50
- Runs batted in: 211

NPB statistics
- Batting average: .237
- Home runs: 0
- Runs batted in: 14

KBO statistics
- Batting average: .310
- Home runs: 26
- Runs batted in: 107
- Stats at Baseball Reference

Teams
- Kansas City Royals (1988–1989); Detroit Tigers (1991); Brother Elephants (1994–1996); Yomiuri Giants (1997); Kaoping Fala (1998–1999); Haitai/Kia Tigers (2001)

Career highlights and awards
- Taiwan Series champion (1994)

Luis Manuel de los Santos Martinez (born December 29, 1966) is a Dominican former Major League Baseball (MLB) first baseman.

== Early life ==
De Los Santos was born in San Cristóbal, Dominican Republic on December 29, 1966. When he was 11, he and his family moved to Queens, New York De Los Santos attended Newtown High School, where he played basketball and baseball.

== Career ==
=== Kansas City Royals ===
De Los Santos was drafted out of high school by the Kansas City Royals in the 2nd round as the 44th overall pick. De Los Santos' debut came against the California Angels on September 7, 1988, where he went 0-for-3 with a strikeout. His first major league hit was recorded against the Oakland Athletics on September 18; a triple off Curt Young.

=== Detroit Tigers ===
On April 5, 1991, the Detroit Tigers claimed De Los Santos on waivers from the Royals. He became a free agent following October 15, 1991.

Following his major league career, De Los Santos played two seasons for Charros de Jalisco of the Mexican League, in 1991 and 1992. He spent a year in Triple-A Edmonton that did not see him get called up to the majors.

=== Brother Elephants ===
De Los Santos Santos signed with the Brother Elephants of the CPBL at the end of the 1993 season with a monthly salary of $7000 USD, becoming the highest paid foreign player in the league. His first game in Taiwan was against the Uni-President Lions at Tainan Municipal Baseball Stadium on March 15, 1994, where he went 0-for-4 with a walk. De Los Santos was known for his eye, notably seen when he set a record of 89 consecutive at-bats without a strikeout from May 27 to July 2. In his first season, where his team won the 1994 Taiwan Series, De Los Santos batted .358 with 15 home runs. He also won the RBI title with 72 runs batted in. De Los Santos batted .352 with 14 home runs in 1995 and batted .375 with 22 home runs in 1996 before moving on to Japan.

=== Yomiuri Giants ===
De Los Santos Santos played for the Yomiuri Giants of Nippon Professional Baseball in 1997. He was dubbed "The Taiwanese Ichiro" by the Japanese media, referencing his high batting average in Taiwan. Contrary to the high expectations, De Los Santos struggled to adapt to the Japanese leagues, batting .182 in his first month. De Los Santos was released by the Giants at the end of the season.

=== Kaoping Fala ===
Following his unsuccessful stint in Japan, de los Santos played for the Kaoping Fala of the Taiwan Major League, where he won the batting and RBI titles in 1998. De Los Santos then played a year for Saraperos de Saltillo and a year for the KBO League's Kia Tigers before playing 50 games for the Baltimore Orioles' Triple-A affiliate, the Rochester Red Wings, in 2002.

Afterward, De Los Santos Santos signed with Gary Southshore Railcats of the independent Northern League and in 2003, played for Nettuno Baseball Club in the Italian Baseball League.

== Coaching career ==
=== Olmecas de Tabasco ===
In 2009, he served as the head coach of the Olmecas de Tabasco team in the Mexican League.

=== DSL Brewers ===
De Los Santos became the hitting coach of the DSL Brewers a Rookie affiliate of the Milwaukee Brewers in the Dominican Summer League in 2010. He was promoted to the role of manager in 2013, but became hitting coach again in 2014.

=== TSG Hawks ===
De Los Santos was announced as the TSG Hawks' batting coach on September 7, 2022. On September 19, 2024, the Hawks' designated hitter Steven Moya wore De Los Santos' number 23 jersey after forgetting to bring his to the game.
