= Bryan Woodall =

American baseball player (born 1986)

Wei Chuan Dragons – No. 52
- Pitcher
- Born: October 24, 1986 (age 39); Phenix City, Alabama, U.S.
- Bats: Right Throws: Right

CPBL debut
- August 2, 2015, for the Chinatrust Brothers

CPBL statistics (through 2025)
- Win–loss record: 78–68
- Earned run average: 3.57
- Strikeouts: 744

Teams
- Chinatrust Brothers (2015–2017); Fubon Guardians (2018–2020); Wei Chuan Dragons (2021–present)

Bryan Woodall (born October 24, 1986) is an American professional baseball pitcher for the Wei Chuan Dragons of the Chinese Professional Baseball League (CPBL). He has previously played in the CPBL for the Chinatrust Brothers and Fubon Guardians.

== Career ==
=== Arizona Diamondbacks ===
Woodall was drafted by the Arizona Diamondbacks in the 21st round, with the 648th overall selection, of the 2008 Major League Baseball draft. He made his professional debut with the Low-A Yakima Bears, logging a 2–5 record and 3.72 ERA with 40 strikeouts across 27 games. In 2009, Woodall made 36 appearances out of the bullpen for the Single-A South Bend Silver Hawks, registering a 4–5 record and 3.24 ERA with 73 strikeouts across 66 2/3 innings pitched.

Woodall split the 2010 campaign between the High-A Visalia Rawhide and Double-A Mobile BayBears. In 44 relief appearances for the two affiliates, he posted an aggregate 6–7 record and 2.76 ERA with 76 strikeouts and 9 saves over 62 innings of work. Woodall returned to Mobile for the 2011 campaign, pitching in 50 games and recording a 3.43 ERA with 68 strikeouts and 4 saves across 65 2/3 innings pitched.

Woodall split the 2012 season between Mobile and the Triple-A Reno Aces, logging a combined 7–2 record and 6.31 ERA with 63 strikeouts over 48 appearances. He returned to the two affiliates in 2013, where he pitched to a 2–4 record and 3.63 ERA with 68 strikeouts across 54 games. In 2014, Woodall played for Mobile and the rookie-level Arizona League Diamondbacks. In 13 appearances (10 starts) split between the two affiliates, he compiled a 1–4 record and 3.48 ERA with 34 strikeouts across 41 1/3 innings pitched. Woodall became a free agent following the season.

=== Lancaster Barnstormers ===
On February 24, 2015, Woodall signed with the Lancaster Barnstormers of the Atlantic League of Professional Baseball. In 19 appearances (13 starts) for the team, Woodall compiled a 3–4 record and 3.54 ERA with 73 strikeouts across 86 1/3 innings pitched.

=== Chinatrust Brothers ===
On August 1, 2015, Woodall signed with the Chinatrust Brothers of the Chinese Professional Baseball League (CPBL) in Taiwan. In 11 starts for the Brothers, Woodall registered a 5–1 record and 3.45 ERA with 65 strikeouts over 73 innings of work.

=== Lancaster Barnstormers (second stint) ===
In 2016, Woodall re-signed with the Lancaster Barnstormers of the Atlantic League of Professional Baseball. In 5 starts for the team, he posted a stellar 3–0 record and 0.47 ERA with 24 strikeouts over 38 innings pitched.

=== Chinatrust Brothers (second stint) ===
On May 25, 2016, Woodall returned to the Chinatrust Brothers of the CPBL. In 14 starts during the remainder of the season, Woodall registered a 6–2 record and 3.93 ERA with 75 strikeouts across 89 1/3 innings pitched.

Woodall made 26 starts for the Brothers during the 2017 campaign, compiling a 13–8 record and 3.63 ERA with 135 strikeouts across 173 2/3 innings pitched. Woodall and the Brothers reached the Taiwan Series, but ultimately lost in 5 games to the Lamigo Monkeys.

=== Fubon Guardians ===
On March 4, 2018, Woodall signed with the Fubon Guardians of the CPBL. In 28 appearances (27 starts) for the Guardians, he compiled a 14–10 record and 3.25 ERA with 126 strikeouts across 169 innings of work.

On December 25, 2018, Woodall re-signed with the Guardians for the 2019 season. In 21 games (18 starts) for Fubon, he struggled to a 2–12 record and 5.48 ERA with 76 strikeouts across 113 1/3 innings pitched. On August 24, 2019, Woodall was released by the Guardians following the promotion of Travis Banwart.

On December 13, 2019, the Guardians announced that they had invited Woodall to tryout for the team during spring training in 2020. He ultimately made the team, but struggled to a 2–9 record and 6.55 ERA with 50 strikeouts in 79 2/3 innings pitched across 16 games (15 starts). Woodall was released again on September 12, 2020, following the promotion of Yoanys Quiala.

=== Wei Chuan Dragons ===
On December 26, 2020, Woodall signed with the Wei Chuan Dragons of the CPBL. He made 34 appearances (20 starts) for the Dragons in 2021, pitching to a 12–5 record and 2.90 ERA with 83 strikeouts across 152 innings of work.

On January 5, 2022, Woodall re-signed with the Dragons. In 47 appearances (6 starts), he accumulated a 7–4 record and 2.28 ERA with 43 strikeouts and 22 saves across 83 innings pitched.

On January 29, 2023, Woodall re-signed with the Dragons for a third season with the team. He made 15 appearances (12 starts) for Wei Chuan, posting a 5–3 record and 2.59 ERA with 20 strikeouts over 80 innings of work. With the Dragons, Woodall won the 2023 Taiwan Series.

On January 23, 2024, Woodall re-signed with the Dragons for a fourth consecutive season. In 17 starts for Wei Chuan, he logged a 5–7 record and 3.34 ERA with 37 strikeouts across 89 innings pitched.

On September 14, 2024, the Dragons announced that Woodall had officially earned his domestic player status after accruing nine years of service. In concurrence with the announcement, the Dragons re-signed Woodall for the 2025 season. In 19 appearances (18 starts) for the Dragons, he compiled a 7-7 record and 2.36 ERA with 34 strikeouts across 106 2/3 innings pitched.

On December 10, 2025, Woodall re-signed with Wei Chuan on a two-year contract.
