= Hong I-chung =

Taiwanese baseball player and coach (born 1961)

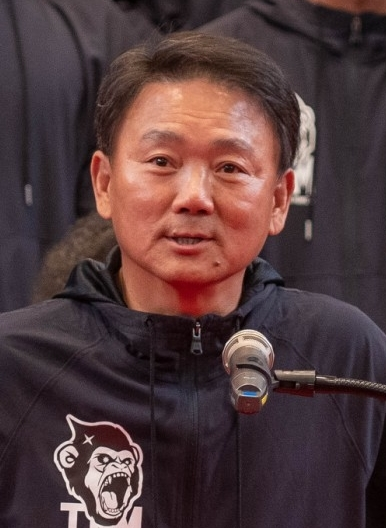
- Hong in 2018

TSG Hawks – No. 2
- Catcher / Manager
- Born: 14 May 1961 (age 65); Kaohsiung City, Taiwan

CPBL debut
- March 17, 1990, for the Brother Elephants

Last CPBL appearance
- October 21, 1996, for the Brother Elephants

CPBL statistics
- Batting average: .268
- Home runs: 32
- Runs batted in: 271
- Stats at Baseball Reference

Teams
- Brother Elephants (1990–1996)

Hong I-chung (born May 14, 1961), nicknamed "Hongzhong", is a Taiwanese former professional baseball catcher and current manager for the TSG Hawks of the Chinese Professional Baseball League (CPBL). He played in the CPBL from 1990 to 1996 for the Brother Elephants. He has previously served as the manager of the La New Bears, Lamigo Monkeys, and Fubon Guardians, and became the manager of the TSG Hawks in early 2023. He is the winningest manager in the CPBL, topping 1,000 wins in 2024.

== Youth era ==
Hong first played baseball when he was in elementary school, and later joined the famous Meiho Senior High School Baseball Team.

== Playing career ==
Before the establishment of the Chinese Professional Baseball League, Hong joined the Brother Elephants team and stayed with the Elephants for 11 years. During these years, he won the Taiwan Series MVP, the Best Nine Award, a Gold Glove. However, after moving to Kaoping Fala of the Taiwan Major League, Hong was regarded as a traitor by the CPBL. After the merger of the two leagues, he did not return to the CPBL until 2004 when he became pitching coach for the La New Bears.

== Coaching career ==
=== La New Bears/Lamigo Monkeys ===
In 2004, Hong became the pitching coach of the La New Bears and became the head coach in the same year after Takuji Ohta resigned from his job. Hong led La New to two consecutive championships in 2006-2007, both beating th e Uni-President 7-Eleven Lions. In 2009, due to some La New players being involved in a match fixing incident and poor performance in leading the team, Hong was sent down to manage the minor league team of the Bears, swapping with Tsai Rongzong who was in that position at the time. In 2010, he returned as the manager for the Bears after Tsai resigned from his job.

After the Bears rebranded into the Lamigo Monkeys in 2011, in 2012, 2014, 2015, and 2017, Hong successfully won the Taiwan Series. The five championships Hong won officially surpassed the record of four championships won by former Lions head coach Lu Wen-sheng. On July 11, 2017, he led the Monkeys to defeat the Uni-President 7-Eleven Lions 4-2, becoming the manager with the most wins in CPBL history and the most wins coaching a single team. Hong then won the Taiwan Series in 2018 and 2019 to give Lamigo their three-peat.

=== Fubon Guardians ===
On December 6, 2019, Hong joined the Fubon Guardians as manager.

=== TSG Hawks ===
In 2023, Hong signed a three-year contract with the TSG Hawks, becoming their first manager. On May 15, 2024, the Hawks defeated Hong's former team, the Rakuten Monkeys, earning Hong his 1,000th career managerial victory.

== International career ==
I-Chung played for the Chinese Taipei national team at many tournaments, including the 1998 Summer Olympics, 2001 Baseball World Cup, and 2002 Asian Games.

I-Chung became the manager the national team for the 2003 Baseball World Cup. He was fired after the team played poorly at the 2008 Summer Olympics. He later returned to the team, managing in the 2019 WBSC Premier12 tournament.
