= Mitsutaka Goto =

Japanese baseball player (born 1978)

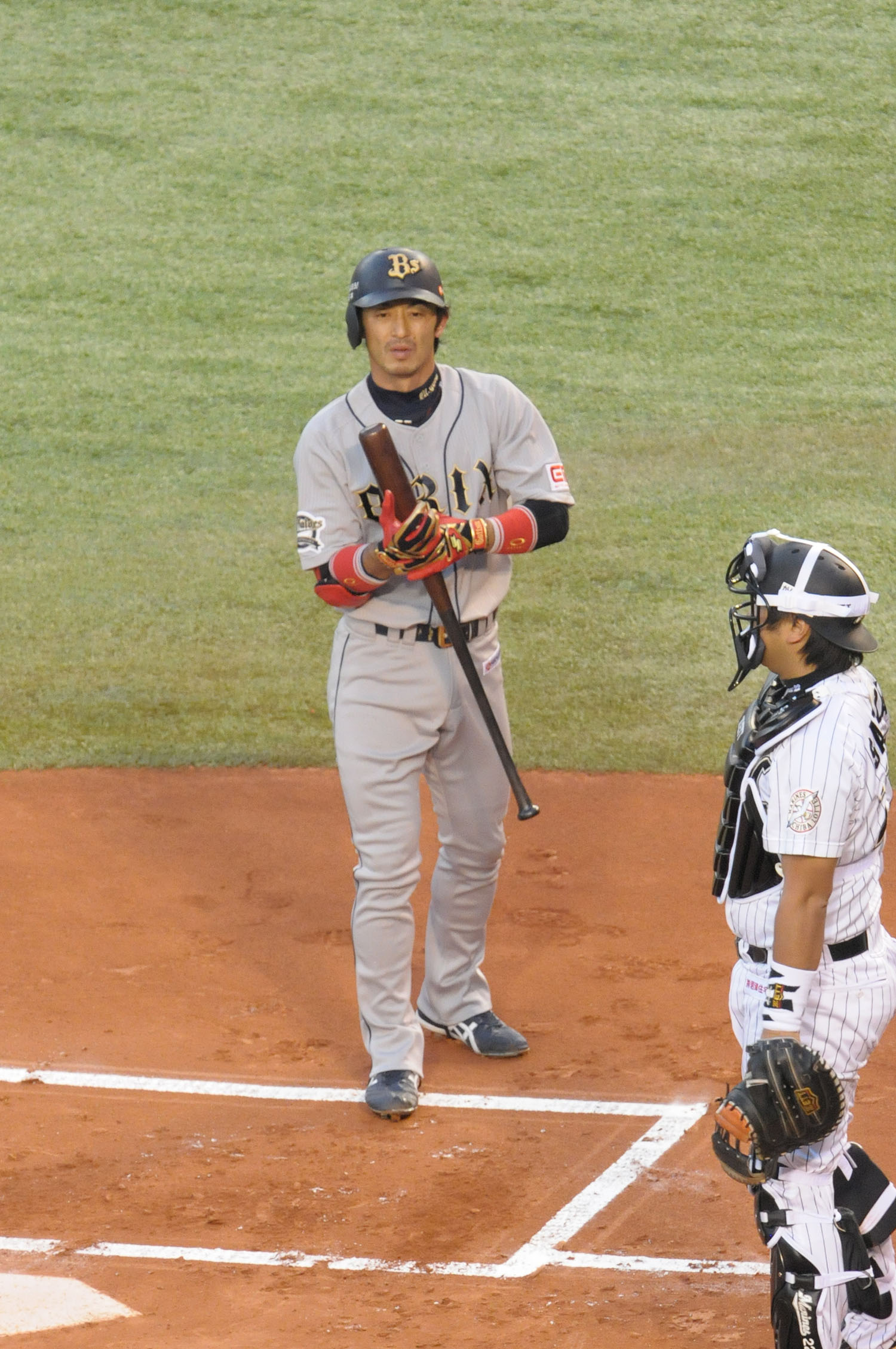
- Gotoh with the Orix Buffaloes

Fubon Guardians – No. 51
- Second baseman / Manager
- Born: July 27, 1978 (age 47)
- Batted: Left Threw: Right

NPB debut
- March 30, 2005, for the Orix BlueWave

Last NPB appearance
- July 31, 2016, for the Tohoku Rakuten Golden Eagles

NPB statistics (through 2016 season)
- Batting average: .269
- Home runs: 95
- RBI: 476
- Stats at Baseball Reference

Teams
- As player: Orix BlueWave/Orix Buffaloes (2002–2013); Tohoku Rakuten Golden Eagles (2014–2016); As manager: Ishikawa Million Stars (2022–2023); Fubon Guardians(2026–present); As coach: Orix Buffaloes (2019–2020); Ishikawa Million Stars (2021)

Mitsutaka Goto (後藤 光尊, born July 27, 1978, in Hachirōgata, Akita) is a Japanese former professional baseball infielder in Japan's Nippon Professional Baseball. He played with the Orix BlueWave/Buffaloes and Tohoku Rakuten Golden Eagles.
