= Yeh Pao-ti =

Taiwanese baseball player (born 1999)

TSG Hawks – No. 73
- Outfielder
- Born: February 23, 1999 (age 27); New Taipei City, Taiwan
- Bats: Left Throws: Left

CPBL debut
- April 3, 2024, for the TSG Hawks

CPBL statistics (through 2025 season)
- Batting average: .184
- Home runs: 1
- Runs batted in: 8
- Stats at Baseball Reference

Teams
- TSG Hawks (2024–present)

Yeh Pao-ti (Chinese: 葉保弟; born February 23, 1999) is a Taiwanese professional baseball outfielder for the TSG Hawks of the Chinese Professional Baseball League (CPBL).

== Career ==
=== TSG Hawks ===
After graduating from I-Shou University, Yeh signed a contract with the TSG Hawks to become their independent training player in late 2022. On May 13, 2023, Yeh was recognized by the team and became an official player.

In his first professional season in the minor leagues of the CPBL, Yeh had a .273 batting average, 8 stolen bases, 45 runs batted in, and 1 home run across 76 games.

On March 29, 2024, the TSG Hawks' YouTube channel posted a video that featured cheerleader Zhao Yi-li and Yeh dancing along to Yeh's support song. The video quickly gained 200 thousand views in one month which lead to Yeh being one of the fan favorites on the Hawks.

On June 12, 2024, the CPBL announced the rosters for All-Star Game, in which Yeh was included.

On October 5, 2025, Yeh hit his first career home run off Lin Kai-Wei of the Wei Chuan Dragons in a 4–3 win for the Hawks.
