= Circle changeup =

Baseball pitch

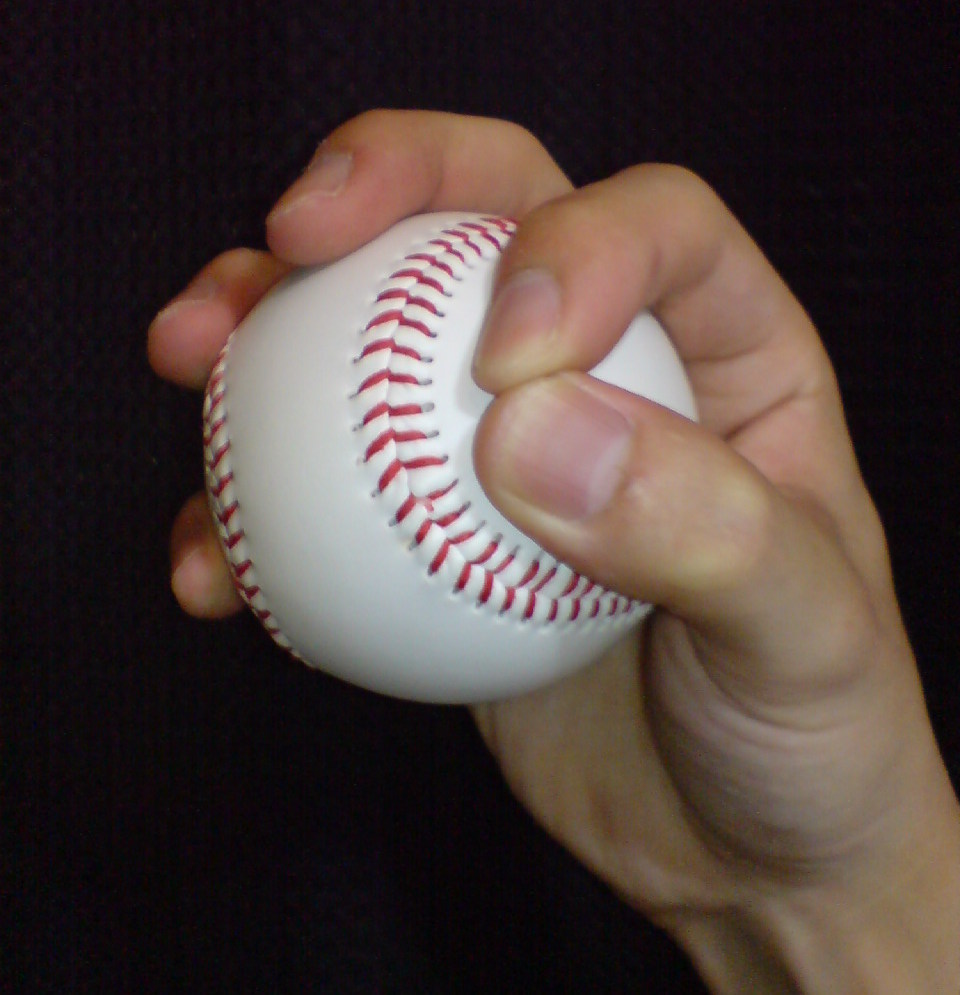
The grip used for a circle changeup

In baseball, a circle changeup (also called the okay changeup, related to the thumb and index finger touching) or circle change is a pitch thrown with a grip that includes a circle formation, hence the name circle changeup. The circle is formed by making a circle with the index finger, holding the thumb at the bottom of the ball parallel to the middle finger and holding the ball far out in the hand. The ball is thrown turning the palm out (pronating the forearm).

== Throwing mechanics ==
A circle change can also be used to provide movement like a two seam fastball but without the stress placed on the arm by a traditional screwball. By placing the index and ring fingers slightly to the inside (that is, towards the thumb) of the ball and sharply pronating the forearm at release, a pitcher can make the ball move downward and inside. Pitchers with smaller hands will only place the index finger slightly to the inside (that is, towards the thumb) of the ball. A left-handed pitcher's circle change will break down and away from a right-handed batter. Effective circle changeups can reduce the platoon split a pitcher will experience.

To follow proper form, a pitcher releases the ball while keeping his wrist straight, then follows through fully. Additional change in velocity can be achieved by dragging the foot that would normally follow through fully with a fastball delivery. However, the most effective way to reduce the velocity of a changeup is by slightly reducing stride length. If the typical stride length for the pitcher's fastball is around 80-90% of pitcher's height, then the pitcher would need to reduce stride by 10-20%. By doing so, the pitcher eliminates the possibility of tipping off the pitch. Simply using a slower arm motion is undesirable, as it may tip off the batter, and will invariably result in less movement on the pitch. If this pitch is placed too high in the strike zone, it can be hit very hard. It is an effective pitch to throw early in the count to produce a groundball; it is not traditionally used to acquire a strikeout. By rotating the wrist (before the release) the pitcher can change the movement from resembling a fastball to resembling a curveball.

Like other changeups, an effective circle changeup must be thrown with an identical arm action to a fastball to avoid tipping off the batter.

== Pitchers ==
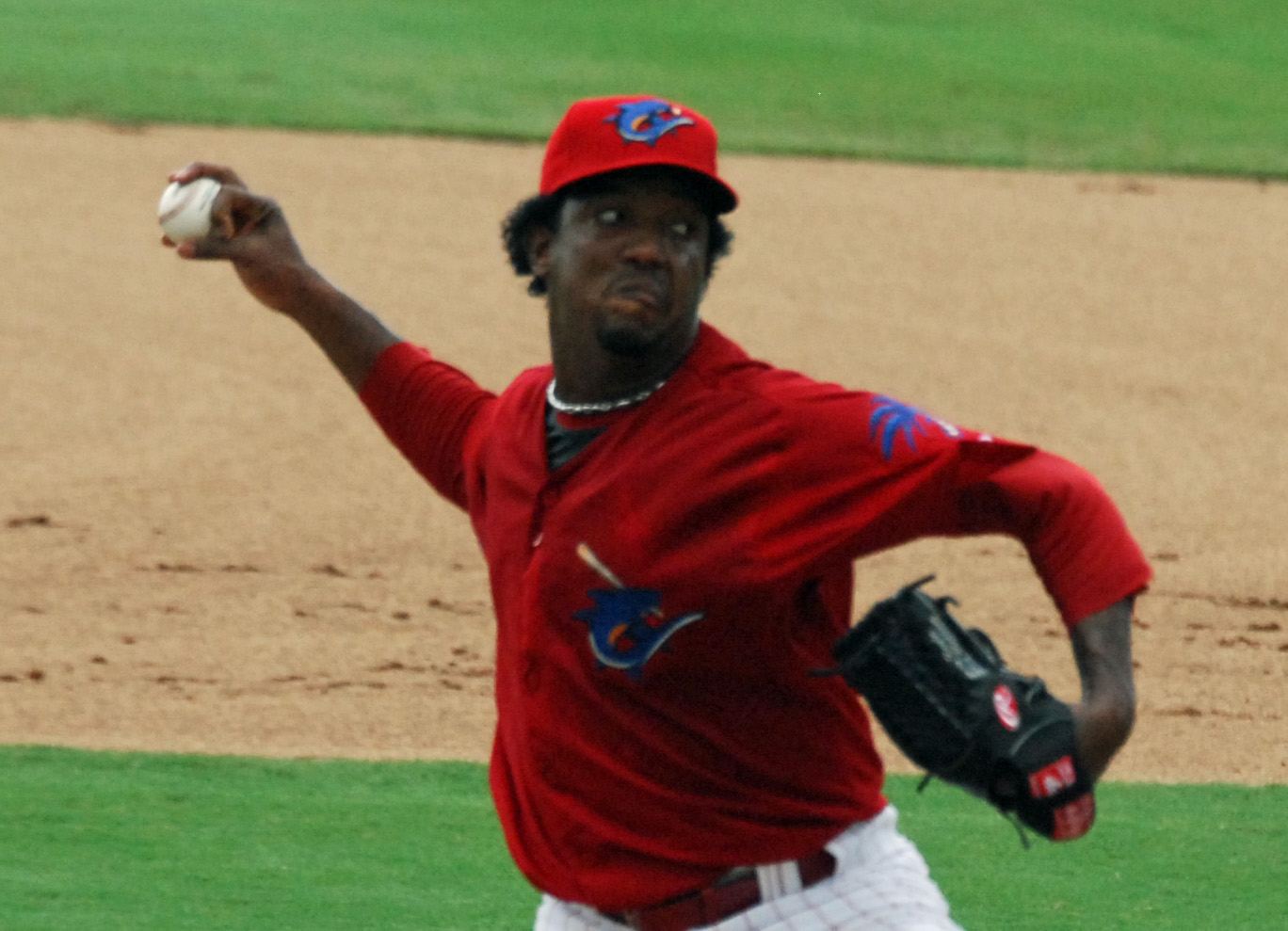
Pedro Martínez throwing a circle change during a game in 2009

Johan Santana, Pedro Martínez, Cole Hamels, Huston Street, Zack Greinke, Kyle Hendricks and Marco Estrada are pitchers who rely or relied heavily on their circle changeup. Former New York Mets closer John Franco was able to generate so much movement on his circle changeup that it mimicked a screwball. Atlanta Braves pitcher Tom Glavine was known for using the outside corner of the plate with his circle changeup, and his teammate, Greg Maddux, relied heavily on the circle change as an out pitch to both left-and right-handed batters. Former Atlanta Braves pitcher Charlie Leibrandt and Cincinnati Reds pitcher Mario Soto also used the circle changeup to great effect. Recently, Toronto Blue Jays pitcher Hyun-jin Ryu used a circle changeup efficiently throughout his first MLB season, throwing a circle changeup that was gripped using the index finger on the seam of the ball and the thumb on the side of the ball to "choke" the ball. According to his autobiography, Nolan Ryan also developed his own circle changeup to add another off-speed pitch without having to throw a slider (as sliders are believed to more frequently cause injuries).

Minnesota Twins ace Frank Viola developed his signature circle changeup by refining a grip taught to him by pitching coach Johnny Podres, helping him win the 1987 World Series MVP and the 1988 AL Cy Young Award, with scouts considering it the premier changeup in Major League Baseball by 1988.
