= Takashi Teraoka =

Japanese baseball player (1942–2011)

- Outfielder/First baseman
- Born: September 13, 1942; Higashimorokata District, Miyazaki
- Died: February 4, 2011 (aged 68); Okinawa Prefecture
- Batted: Right Threw: Right

NPB debut
- 1965, for the Hiroshima Carp

Last appearance
- 1972, for the Nankai Hawks

NPB statistics
- Batting average: .210
- Home runs: 18
- Runs batted in: 73
- Stats at Baseball Reference

Teams
- As player: Hiroshima Carp (1965–1968); Nankai Hawks (1970–1972); As coach: Nankai Hawks (1973–1975); Hiroshima Carp (1976–1985); Nankai Hawks (1986); Yokohama Taiyo Whales (1987–1989); Samsung Lions (1991–1992); Jungo Bears (1993–1994); Fukuoka Daiei Hawks (1995–1997); Wei Chuan Dragons (1999); Chinatrust Whales (2003–2005); Sinon Bulls (2009–2010)

Takashi Teraoka

Japanese name
- Kanji: 寺岡 孝
- Kana: てらおか たかし
Transcriptions
- Romanization: Teraoka Takashi

Takashi Teraoka (September 13, 1942 – February 4, 2011) was a Japanese baseball player and coach. He played and coached for the Nankai Hawks and Hiroshima Carp of Nippon Professional Baseball. He also coached in South Korea's KBO League, and Taiwan's Chinese Professional Baseball League.

Teraoka died in Okinawa Prefecture on February 4, 2011, at the age of 68.
