= Sloppy Thurston =

American baseball player (1899–1973)

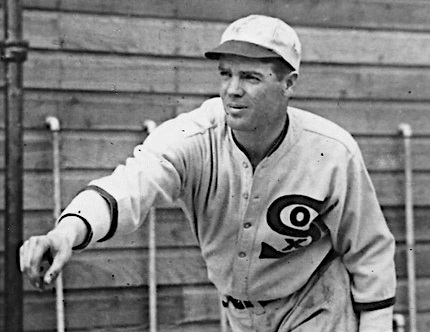
- Thurston, circa 1924
- Pitcher
- Born: June 2, 1899; Fremont, Nebraska, U.S.
- Died: September 14, 1973 (aged 74); Los Angeles, California, U.S.
- Batted: Right Threw: Right

MLB debut
- April 19, 1923, for the St. Louis Browns

Last MLB appearance
- October 1, 1933, for the Brooklyn Dodgers

MLB statistics
- Win–loss record: 89–86
- Earned run average: 4.24
- Strikeouts: 306
- Stats at Baseball Reference

Teams
- St. Louis Browns (1923); Chicago White Sox (1923–1926); Washington Senators (1927); Brooklyn Robins/Dodgers (1930–1933)

Hollis John "Sloppy" Thurston (June 2, 1899 – September 14, 1973) was an American professional baseball pitcher. He played in Major League Baseball (MLB) for the St. Louis Browns, Chicago White Sox, Washington Senators, and Brooklyn Robins/Dodgers between 1923 and 1933. He batted and threw right-handed.

== Biography ==
Thurston was born in Fremont, Nebraska, and graduated from John H. Francis Polytechnic High School. His nickname "Sloppy" was given to him ironically; in the often rough-and-rumble environment of early twentieth century baseball, Thurston had a reputation for being fastidiously well-groomed.

Thurston was a screwball pitcher. He played professional baseball from 1920 to 1938, spending time in the minor leagues when not in the majors. He played his first MLB game on April 19, 1923, with the St. Louis Browns.

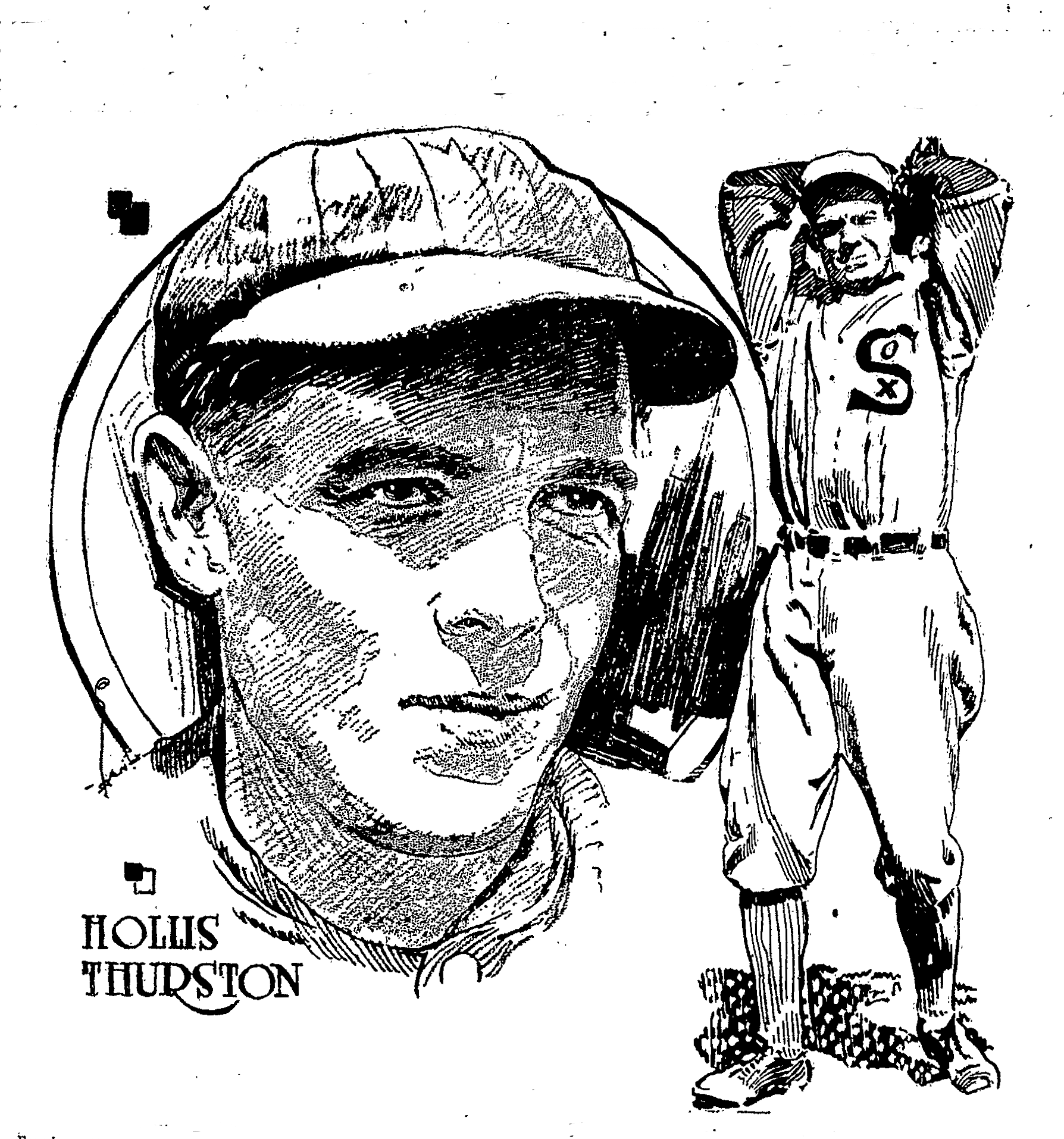
A sketch of Thurston from 1924

On August 22, 1923, Thurston became the fifth pitcher in major-league history to pitch an immaculate inning, striking out all three batters on nine total pitches in the 12th inning of a game against the Philadelphia Athletics; he was also the first pitcher to achieve the feat in extra innings and the only White Sox pitcher to do so for 101 years until Michael Kopech did so in 2024.

In 1924, Thurston led the American League with 28 complete games, posting a 20–14 record in 36 starts, while also leading the league in hits allowed (330), earned runs allowed (123), and home runs allowed (17) in 291 innings pitched.

Thurston played his last MLB game on October 1, 1933. He finished his nine-year MLB career with a win–loss record of 89–86, a 4.24 earned run average, and 306 strikeouts. For a pitcher, he was an excellent hitter, posting a .270 batting average (175-for-648) with 5 home runs and 79 runs batted in. Thurston's batting was good enough that he was frequently called on to pinch hit; he accumulated 53 career plate appearances as a pinch-hitter.

Thurston died on September 14, 1973, in Los Angeles, California. He is interred at Holy Cross Cemetery in Culver City, California.
