= Liao Jen-lei =

Taiwanese baseball player (born 1993)

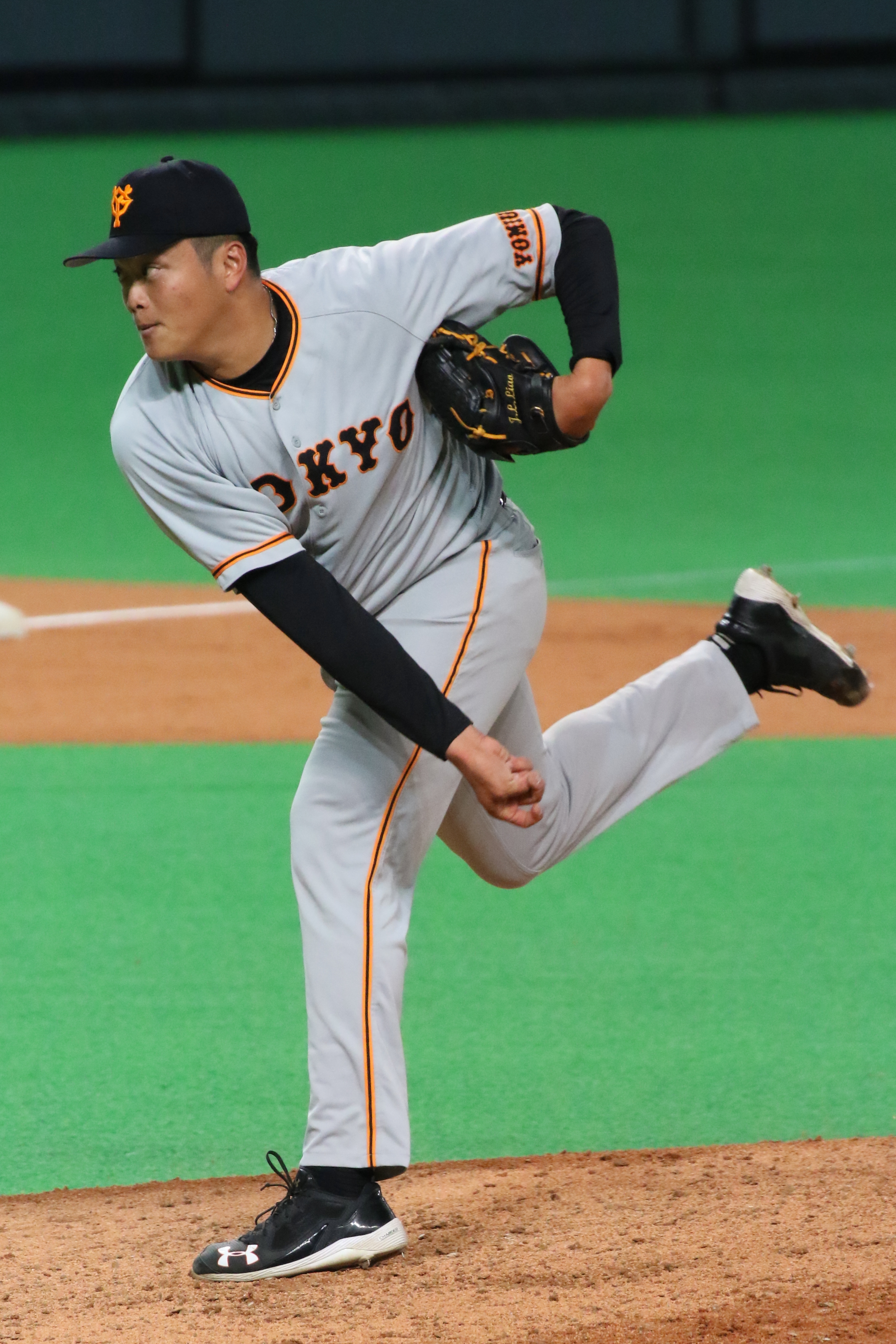
- Liao with the Yomiuri Giants

Fubon Guardians – No. 13
- Pitcher
- Born: August 30, 1993 (age 32); Taoyuan, Taiwan
- Bats: Right Throws: Right

Professional debut
- NPB: April 3, 2019, for the Saitama Seibu Lions
- CPBL: March 14, 2021, for the Wei Chuan Dragons

NPB statistics (through 2019 season)
- Win–loss record: 0–0
- Earned run average: 3.00
- Strikeouts: 4

CPBL statistics (through 2025)
- Win–loss record: 2–11
- Earned run average: 5.60
- Strikeouts: 89

Teams
- Saitama Seibu Lions (2019); Wei Chuan Dragons (2021–2024); Fubon Guardians (2025–present)

Career highlights and awards
- CPBL: Taiwan Series champion (2023)

Liao Jen-lei (Chinese: 廖任磊; born August 30, 1993) is a Taiwanese professional baseball pitcher for the Fubon Guardians of the Chinese Professional Baseball League (CPBL). He has previously played in Nippon Professional Baseball (NPB) for the Saitama Seibu Lions.

== Early life ==
Liao was born in Taoyuan, Taiwan on 30 August 1993, to parents who played baseball and softball. He attended Okayama Kyosei High School in Japan, and graduated from Kainan University in his hometown of Taoyuan.

== Career ==
=== Pittsburgh Pirates ===
Liao signed with the Pittsburgh Pirates of Major League Baseball in January 2014. He pitched for the rookie-level Gulf Coast League Pirates, primarily as a reliever, for two seasons and was subsequently released. While in the Pirates organization, Liao appeared in the 2015 Asian Baseball Championship as a member of the Chinese Taipei national baseball team.

=== Yomiuri Giants ===
Following his release, Liao returned to Japan, where he had attended high school, and was selected by the Yomiuri Giants in the seventh round of the 2016 Nippon Professional Baseball draft. Because Liao had pitched in Minor League Baseball, the Giants filed a petition for him to gain rookie status, which was granted in January 2017. Liao spent two years pitching with the Giants affiliate in the Eastern League. He was placed on the Chinese Taipei preliminary roster for the 2018 Asian Games, but withdrew from the competition.

=== Saitama Seibu Lions ===
Liao signed with the Saitama Seibu Lions on 17 December 2018. Liao's signing was formally announced by the team in January 2019. Liao was promoted to the first team on 31 March 2019, and debuted on 3 April.

=== Wei Chuan Dragons ===
Liao returned to his native Taiwan in 2019 and appeared in the Asia Winter Baseball League. The next season, he trained with the Chinatrust Brothers farm team. Liao declared for the mid-season Chinese Professional Baseball League draft that year. He was selected by the Wei Chuan Dragons as a bonus pick.
