= Takeshi Shimazaki =

Japanese baseball player and coach

- Pitcher / Coach
- Born: March 3, 1967 (age 59)
- Batted: Right Threw: Right

NPB debut
- April 23, 1992, for the Nippon-Ham Fighters

Last appearance
- 1999, for the Chunichi Dragons

NPB statistics (through 2001)
- Win–loss record: 20-19
- ERA: 3.09
- Strikeouts: 243
- Stats at Baseball Reference

Teams
- As player: Nippon-Ham Fighters (1992–1998); Chunichi Dragons (1999–2000); Hiroshima Toyo Carp (2001); As coach: Nippon-Ham Fighters/Hokkaido Nippon-Ham Fighters (2002–2013, 2017–2023)

Career highlights and awards
- 1× NPB All-Star (1996); 1× NPB Hold Champion (1996)

Takeshi Shimazaki (島崎 毅, Shimazaki Takeshi; born March 3, 1967 in Narita, Chiba) is a retired Japanese professional pitcher.
