= Bradin Hagens =

American baseball player (born 1989)

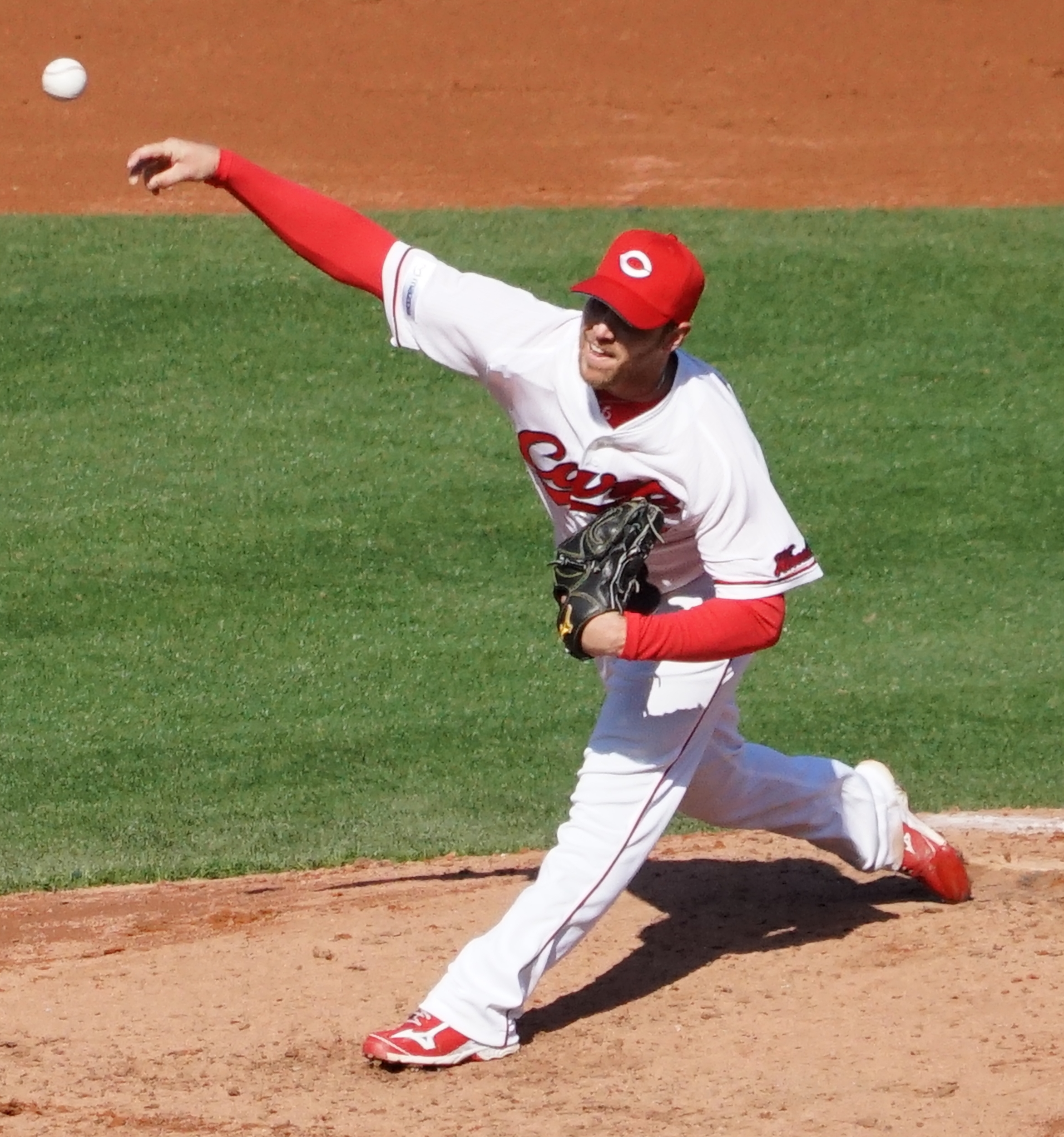
- Hagens with the Hiroshima Toyo Carp

Free agent
- Pitcher
- Born: May 12, 1989 (age 37); Modesto, California, U.S.
- Bats: Right Throws: Right

Professional debut
- MLB: August 14, 2014, for the Arizona Diamondbacks
- NPB: 2016, for the Hiroshima Toyo Carp
- CPBL: March 25, 2021, for the Rakuten Monkeys

MLB statistics (through 2014 season)
- Win–loss record: 0–1
- Earned run average: 3.38
- Strikeouts: 2

NPB statistics (through 2017 season)
- Win–loss record: 7–5
- Earned run average: 3.48
- Strikeouts: 43

CPBL statistics (through 2026 season)
- Win–loss record: 42–21
- Earned run average: 2.65
- Strikeouts: 382
- Saves: 58
- Stats at Baseball Reference

Teams
- Arizona Diamondbacks (2014); Hiroshima Toyo Carp (2016–2017); Rakuten Monkeys (2021–2023); TSG Hawks (2024–2026)

Bradin Carl Hagens (born May 12, 1989) is an American professional baseball pitcher who is a free agent. He has previously played in Major League Baseball (MLB) for the Arizona Diamondbacks. He has also played in Nippon Professional Baseball (NPB) for the Hiroshima Toyo Carp and in the CPBL for the Rakuten Monkeys and TSG Hawks.

== Career ==
=== Arizona Diamondbacks ===
Hagens was drafted by the Arizona Diamondbacks in the sixth round, with the 186th overall selection, of the 2009 Major League Baseball draft out of Merced College. He made his professional debut with the rookie–level Missoula Osprey, logging a 3.42 ERA across 15 contests. Hagens spent the 2010 and 2011 seasons with the Single–A South Bend Silver Hawks. In 63 combined appearances, he posted an 11–13 record and 4.91 ERA with 134 strikeouts across 185 innings.

Hagens spent the 2012 season with the High–A Visalia Rawhide, also appearing in two games for the Double–A Mobile BayBears. In 35 games for Visalia, he posted a 3.88 ERA with 82 strikeouts in 95 innings. Hagens returned to Mobile in 2013, registering an 11–8 record and 3.47 ERA with 93 strikeouts across 148 innings.

Hagens began the 2014 season with Mobile, recording a 4.15 ERA in 24 games. On August 14, 2014, he was selected to the 40-man roster and promoted to the major leagues for the first time. Hagens was optioned back to Triple–A Reno on August 18, after making two appearances with the Diamondbacks. On August 21, he was removed from the 40–man roster and sent outright to Reno.

=== Tampa Bay Rays ===
On April 4, 2015, Hagens was traded to the Tampa Bay Rays in exchange for cash considerations. He made 30 appearances (20 starts) split between the Double–A Montgomery Biscuits and Triple–A Durham Bulls, accumulating a 9–10 record and 3.23 ERA with 96 strikeouts across 133 2/3 innings pitched. Hagens elected free agency following the season on November 6.

=== Hiroshima Toyo Carp ===
On December 19, 2015, Hagens signed with the Hiroshima Toyo Carp of Nippon Professional Baseball. He made 59 appearances for Hiroshima in 2016, recording a 2.92 ERA with 33 strikeouts across 83 1/3 innings pitched.

Hagens pitched in 11 games for the Carp in 2017, but struggled to a 6.60 ERA with 10 strikeouts across 15 innings.

=== Arizona Diamondbacks (second stint) ===
On February 16, 2018, Hagens returned stateside and signed a minor league deal with the Arizona Diamondbacks. He made 21 appearances split between the Triple–A Reno Aces and rookie–level Arizona League Diamondbacks, but struggled to a combined 7.23 ERA with 50 strikeouts in 61 innings. Hagens elected free agency following the season on November 3.

=== Fargo-Moorhead RedHawks ===
On April 1, 2019, Hagens signed with the Fargo-Moorhead RedHawks of the American Association of Independent Professional Baseball. He made just one start for the RedHawks, working seven innings and surrendering two runs on three hits with seven strikeouts.

=== Arizona Diamondbacks (third stint) ===
On May 20, 2019, Hagens's contract was purchased by the Arizona Diamondbacks and he was assigned to the Triple-A Reno Aces. He spent the remainder of the year with the Aces, working to a 4–2 record and 6.03 ERA with 45 strikeouts. Hagens elected free agency following the season on November 4.

=== Fargo-Moorhead RedHawks (second stint) ===
On March 18, 2020, Hagens signed with the Fargo-Moorhead RedHawks of the American Association. He made 12 appearances (11 starts) for Fargo, logging a 4–3 record and 3.43 ERA with 64 strikeouts across 60 1/3 innings pitched.

=== Rakuten Monkeys ===
On December 30, 2020, Hagens signed with the Rakuten Monkeys of the Chinese Professional Baseball League (CPBL) in Taiwan. On September 20, 2021, Hagens set a CPBL record with 25 consecutive scoreless appearances without allowing a run. In 53 games, he posted a 6–4 record and 2.79 ERA with 43 strikeouts in 80 2/3 innings pitched. Following the season, the CPBL announced Hagens as a Gold Glove winner for the 2021 season.

On January 8, 2022, Hagens re-signed with the Monkeys for the 2022 season. In 59 relief outings, he registered a 1.44 ERA with 65 strikeouts and 36 saves across 68 2/3 innings pitched. In 2023, Hagens appeared in 50 contests for Rakuten, pitching to a 3.26 ERA with 42 strikeouts and 13 saves across 58.0 innings of work. He became a free agent following the 2023 season.

=== TSG Hawks ===
On March 1, 2024, Hagens signed with the TSG Hawks of the CPBL. In 13 starts for the Hawks, he compiled a 7-0 record and 2.04 ERA with 54 strikeouts across 79 1/3 innings pitched.

On December 24, 2024, Hagens re-signed with the Hawks on a one-year, $329,500 contract. On August 16, 2025, Hagens broke the CPBL record for most consecutive wins, with 22. In 25 starts for the Hawks, he registered a 13-3 record and 1.89 ERA with 109 strikeouts across 152 1/3 innings pitched.

On December 11, 2025, Hagens re-signed with the Hawks on a one-year contract. He was released on August 31, 2026.
