= Kento Onodera =

Japanese baseball player (born 1998)

Free agent
- Pitcher
- Born: July 13, 1998 (age 27); Miyagi Prefecture, Japan
- Bats: Right Throws: Right

CPBL debut
- April 4, 2024, for the TSG Hawks

CPBL statistics (through 2024 season)
- Win–loss record: 2–4
- Earned run average: 2.31
- Strikeouts: 25

Teams
- TSG Hawks (2024)

Kento Onodera (小野寺賢人, born July 13, 1998) is a Japanese professional baseball pitcher who is a free agent. He has previously played in the Chinese Professional Baseball League (CPBL) for the TSG Hawks.

== Career ==
=== Saitama Musashi Heat Bears ===
Onodera signed with the Saitama Musashi Heat Bears of the Baseball Challenge League in 2021.

In 2023, Onodera made 21 appearances (18 starts) for the Heat Bears, recording a 2.92 ERA with 114 strikeouts across 129 2/3 innings pitched. Following the season, he was named the league's Pitcher of the Year.

=== TSG Hawks ===
On December 17, 2023, Onodera signed with the TSG Hawks of the Chinese Professional Baseball League. He made 9 starts for the Hawks in 2024, compiling a 2-4 record and 2.31 ERA with 25 strikeouts across 50 2/3 innings pitched. Onodera suffered a season-ending torn elbow ligament in June, opting for platelet-rich plasma treatment rather than surgery. As a result, Onodera was released by the Hawks on August 9, 2024.

On November 7, 2024, Onodera re-signed with the Hawks. He spent the 2025 season in the CPBL minor league as he continued to recover from his injury; in 15 appearances, he posted a 3.353 ERA and 1.18 WHIP. Onodera was released by the Hawks on August 25, 2025.
