= Tu Chuang-hsun =

Taiwanese baseball player

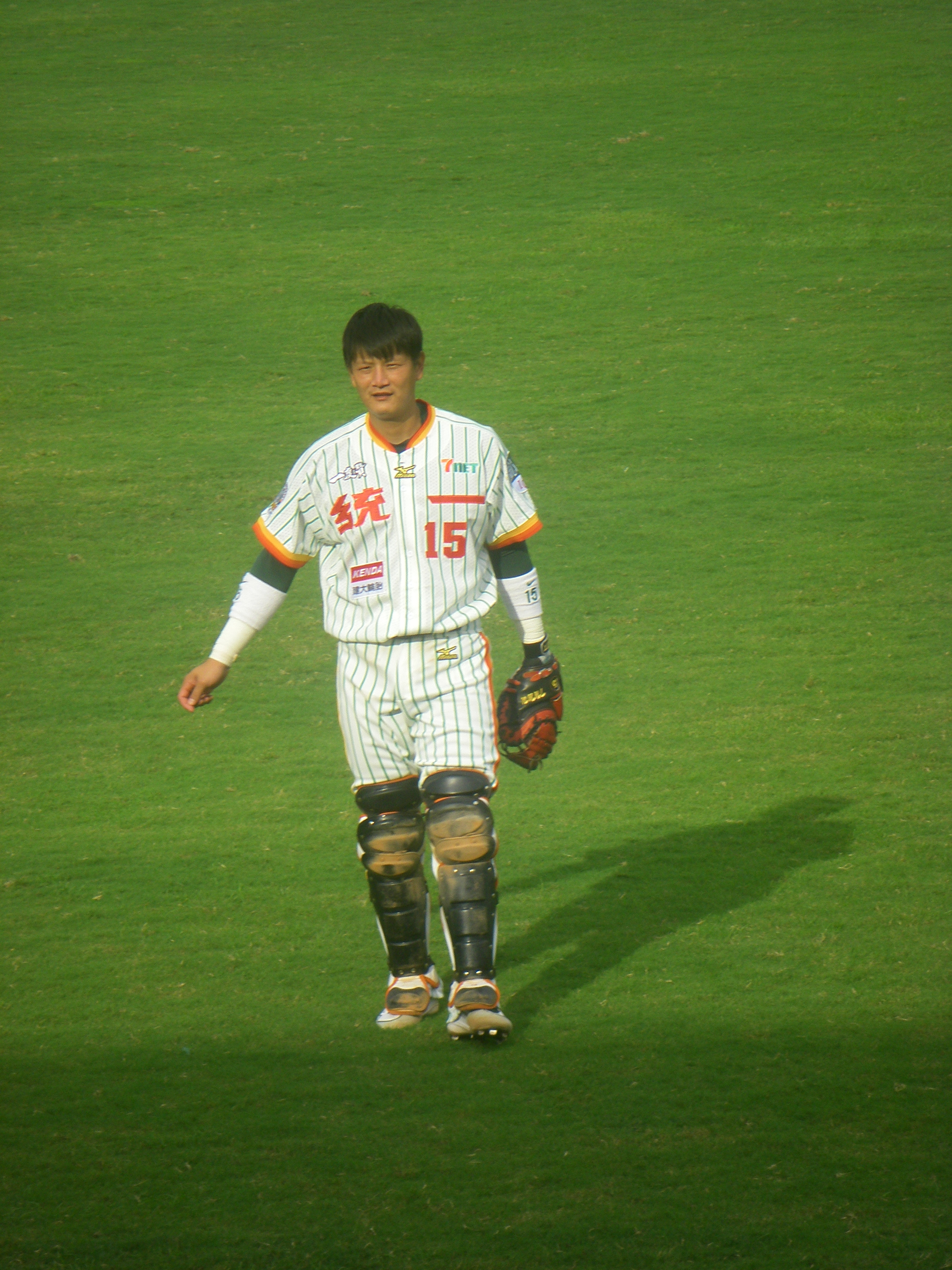

TSG Hawks – No. 65
- Catcher / Coach
- Born: July 6, 1982 (age 43)
- Bats: Right Throws: Right

CPBL debut
- March 22, 2006, for the Uni-President Lions

Career statistics (through 2008)
- Games: 69
- Batting average: 0.266
- Hits: 57
- Home runs: 2
- RBIs: 30
- Stolen bases: 3
- Stats at Baseball Reference

Tu Chuang-hsun (simplified Chinese: 涂壮勋; traditional Chinese: 涂壯勳; pinyin: Tú Zhuàngxūn) born July 26, 1982, is a former Taiwanese professional baseball player who previously played for Uni-President Lions of the Chinese Professional Baseball League.

== See also ==
- Chinese Professional Baseball League
- Uni-President Lions
