= Shi Zhongheng =

Chinese engineer (1930–2024)

- 施仲衡
- Born: November 1930; Suzhou, Jiangsu, China
- Died: 23 December 2024 (aged 94); Beijing, China
- Education: Southwest Jiaotong University; Beijing Foreign Studies University; Russian University of Transport
- Spouse: Li Taihui
- Scientific career
- Fields: Urban rail transit
- Workplaces: Beijing Urban Construction Design and Research Institute

Shi Zhongheng (Chinese: 施仲衡; pinyin: Shī Zhònghéng; November 1930 – 23 December 2024) was a Chinese engineer specializing in urban rail transit, and an academician of the Chinese Academy of Engineering.

== Life and career ==
Shi was born in Suzhou, Jiangsu, in November 1930, to Shi Chuncheng (施纯丞), an educator. His uncle Chen Changyan (陈昌言) was a bridge expert and chief engineer of Nanjing Yangtze River Bridge. In 1950, he enrolled at Tangshan Institute of Technology (now Southwest Jiaotong University), where he majored in the Bridge and Tunnel Department.

After university in July 1953, Shi stayed for teaching. Soon after, he became a member of the Korean War Aid Engineering Team, participating the airport project in Panmunjom, North Korea. In November of the same year, he returned to China and continued to teach at Tangshan Institute of Technology. He joined the Chinese Communist Party (CCP) in 1954. In August of the same year, he studied in the preparatory class for studying in the Soviet Union at Beijing Russian Language Specialized School (now Beijing Foreign Studies University). On 1 January 1955, he married Li Taihui (李太惠) at Tangshan Institute of Technology. In November 1955, he was sent to the Moscow Railway Academy (now Russian University of Transport) to pursue a graduate degree in underground railways.

Shi returned to China in December 1956 and became a translator for the Underground Railway Inspection Team of the Ministry of Railways. In October 1959, he concurrently served as a technical consultant for the Beijing Subway Engineering Bureau and the 3rd Survey and Design Institute (Tianjin) of the Ministry of Railways. In February 1965, he became an engineer in the Design Department of Beijing Subway Engineering Bureau.

Shi enlisted in the People's Liberation Army (PLA) in February 1970, and was appointed director of the Research Institute of the 507th Unit of the Railway Corps in February 1973. In November 1976, the Beijing Subway project was handed over from the Railway Corps to the Infrastructure Engineering Corps, and Shi was chosen as director of the Infrastructure Engineering Corps Research and Design Institute. In 1983, the Infrastructure Engineering Corps Design and Research Institute was renamed as the Beijing Urban Construction Design and Research Institute, and Shi was appointed chief engineer. In 1984, he was hired as chief engineer of China Metro Engineering Consulting Company.

On 23 December 2024, Shi died in Beijing at the age of 94.

== Honours and awards ==
- November 1999 Member of the Chinese Academy of Engineering (CAE)
