= Kazumasa Yoshida =

Japanese baseball player (born 1989)

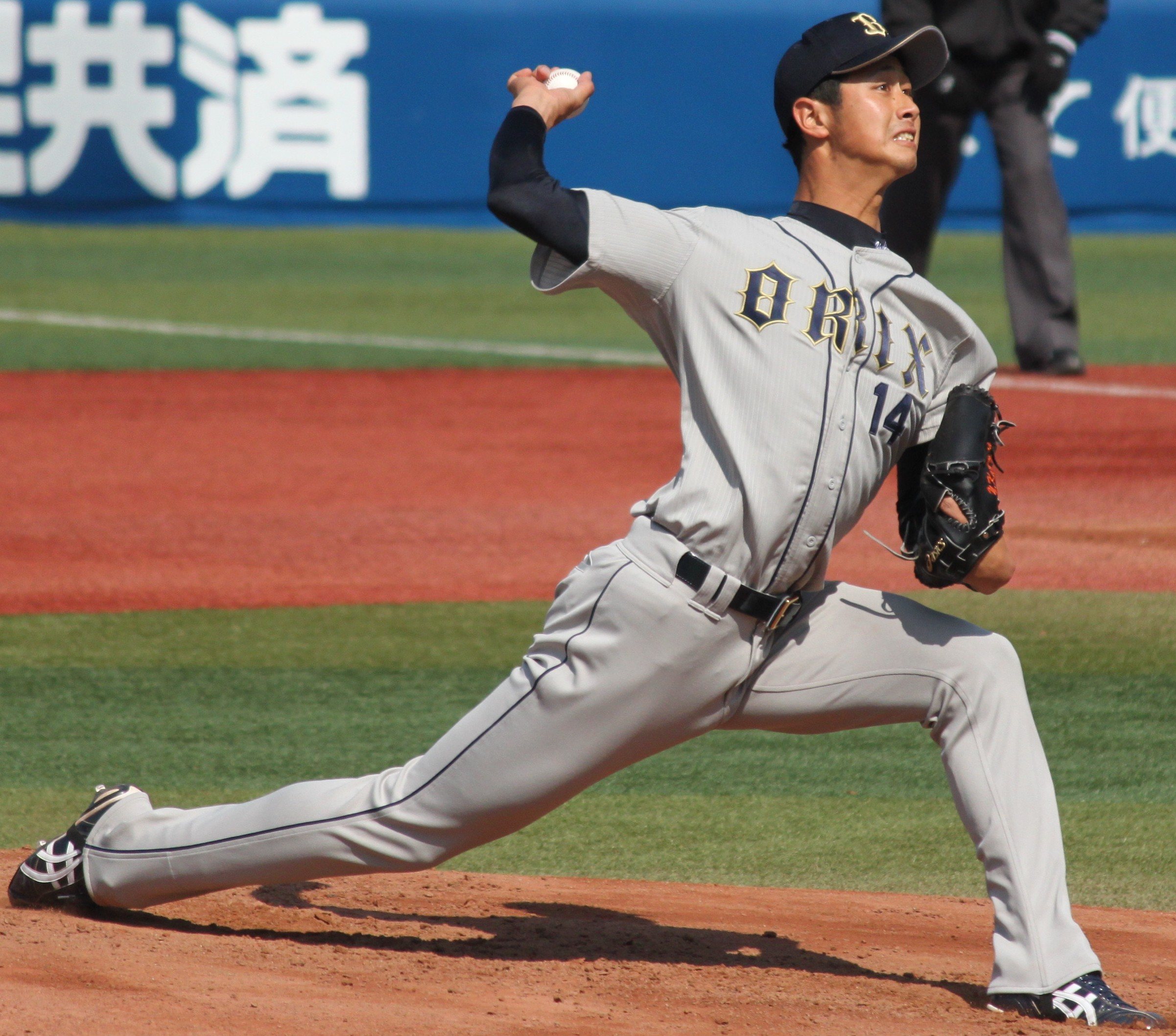
- Yoshida with the Orix Buffaloes

Free agent
- Pitcher
- Born: September 24, 1989 (age 37); Kashihara, Nara, Japan
- Bats: Left Throws: Right

Professional debut
- NPB: April 6, 2014, for the Orix Buffaloes
- CPBL: August 25, 2024, for the TSG Hawks

NPB statistics (through 2021 season)
- Win–loss record: 18–20
- Earned run average: 3.74
- Strikeouts: 269

CPBL statistics (through August 15, 2025)
- Win–loss record: 3–7
- Earned run average: 4.25
- Strikeouts: 61
- Stats at Baseball Reference

Teams
- Orix Buffaloes (2014–2021); TSG Hawks (2024–2025)

Kazumasa Yoshida (吉田 一将, Yoshida Kazumasa; born September 24, 1989) is a Japanese professional baseball pitcher who is a free agent. He has previously played in Nippon Professional Baseball (NPB) for the Orix Buffaloes, and in the Chinese Professional Baseball League (CPBL) for the TSG Hawks.

== Career ==
=== Orix Buffaloes ===
Yoshida was drafted by the Orix Buffaloes in the 1st round of the 2013 NPB draft. He made 226 total appearances for Orix spanning seven seasons, compiling an 18–20 record and 3.74 ERA with 269 strikeouts across 341 1/3 innings pitched. Yoshida was released by the Buffaloes during the 2021 season, after he struggled to a 7.66 ERA in 24 games for their farm team.

=== Niigata Albirex ===
Yoshida signed with the Niigata Albirex of the Baseball Challenge League for the 2022 season. In 2024, the club became the Oisix Niigata Albirex, and joined the Eastern League. In 34 appearances for the team in 2024, Yoshida recorded a 2.34 ERA with 30 strikeouts across 34 2/3 innings of work.

=== TSG Hawks ===
On August 1, 2024, Yoshida signed with the TSG Hawks of the Chinese Professional Baseball League. In 15 appearances down the stretch, he recorded an 0.57 ERA with seven strikeouts and two saves across 15 2/3 innings pitched.

Yoshida made 13 starts for the Hawks in 2025, compiling a 3-6 record and 5.10 ERA with 54 strikeouts over 67 innings of work. Yoshida was released by the team on August 23, 2025.
