= TSG Hawks =

Professional baseball team in Taiwan

- 台鋼雄鷹
- Logo

Information
- League: Chinese Professional Baseball League
- Location: Kaohsiung City
- Ballpark: Chengcing Lake Baseball Stadium
- Founded: 2022; 4 years ago
- Colors: Green, white
- Ownership: Taiwan Steel Group
- General manager: Liu Tung-yang
- Manager: Hong I-chung
- Website: www.tsghawks.com

The TSG Hawks (Chinese: 台鋼雄鷹) are a Taiwanese professional baseball team based in Kaohsiung. The Hawks compete in the Chinese Professional Baseball League (CPBL) in Taiwan and play their home games at Chengcing Lake Baseball Stadium. The team is owned by Taiwan Steel Group and was formed in 2022 as part of the CPBL expansion. They joined the CPBL's minor league for the 2023 season, and made their debut in the major league in the 2024 season.

== History ==
On March 2, 2022, TSG officially applied for membership in the CPBL, which was approved by CPBL's executive council on April 27, 2022. In July of the same year, the Hawks participated in CPBL's 2022 season draft where they picked a total of 30 players to form the basis of their initial roster.

On January 16, 2023, Hong I-chung had been announced as the first manager of the team.

== Records ==
=== Regular seasons ===
Season	Wins	Losses	Ties	Winning pct.	Place
2024	49 (23/26)	70 (37/33)	1 (0/1)	.412 (.383/.441)	6 (6/5)
2025	59 (30/29)	59 (30/29)	2 (0/2)	.500 (.500/.500)	4 (3/3)
2026	54 (30/24)	65 (29/36)	1 (1/0)	.454 (.508/.400)	6 (3/6)

== Roster ==
TSG Hawks roster
Players			Coaches
Pitchers: 4 (Japan) Kento Onodera; 10 (Taiwan) Hsieh Pao-chi; 11 (Taiwan) Chen Cheng-yi; 12 (Taiwan) Wang Po-chieh; 14 (Taiwan) Lin Shi-xiang; 17 (Taiwan) Chen Yu-hung; 18 (Taiwan) Lee Hsin-yin; 19 (Taiwan) Shih Tzu-chien; 20 (Taiwan) Chiang Chen-yen; 22 (Taiwan) Wu Bo-wei; 26 (Taiwan) Teoh Xi-kai; 28 (Taiwan) Chen Guan-hao; 30 (United States) Eric Stout; 32 (United States) Spenser Watkins; 40 (United States) Bradin Hagens; 41 (Japan) Kazumasa Yoshida; 46 (Taiwan) Huang Qun; 54 (Taiwan) Tseng Yi-hsiang; 55 (Taiwan) Wu Yu-cheng; 56 (Taiwan) Huang Shao-ray; 57 (Taiwan) Fang Yu-huai; 58 (Taiwan) Chen Wei-hao; 62 (Taiwan) Tseng Pin-yang; 66 (Taiwan) Chen Po-ching; 67 (Taiwan) Liao Yi-chung; 69 (Japan) Shuto Sakurai; 74 (Taiwan) Hsu Yu-ming; 84 (Taiwan) Hsu Chun-yang; 85 (Taiwan) Huang Zi-hao; 90 (Taiwan) Chen Chung-kuang; 93 (Taiwan) Chang Cheng-en; 95 (Taiwan) Wang Yao-lin; 97 (Taiwan) Huang Po-jui; 98 (Taiwan) Guo Yu-yan; 99 (Taiwan) Yang Ta-hsiang	Catchers: 15 (Taiwan) Wu Po-hsuan; 27 (Taiwan) Liao Yi-an; 29 (Taiwan) Jhang Jhao-yuan; 31 (Taiwan) Wu Ming-hung; 33 (Taiwan) Chen Jhih-jia; 78 (Taiwan) Chen Shih-chia; Infielders: 1 (Taiwan) Tseng Tzu-yu; 5 (Taiwan) Yen Yu-hsuan; 6 (Taiwan) Wang Po-hsuan; 7 (Taiwan) Kuo Yung-wei; 16 (Taiwan) Lin Jia-hong; 25 (Taiwan) Huang Ping-yang; 36 (Taiwan) Tang Jia-hao; 39 (Taiwan) Wu Nien-ting; 42 (Taiwan) Huang Chieh-hsi; 43 (Taiwan) Hu Kuan-yu; 44 (Taiwan) Tseng Yu-ching; 59 (Taiwan) Kuo Fu-lin; 64 (Taiwan) Sung Po-han; 71 (Taiwan) Tu Chia-ming; 79 (Taiwan) Chen Fei-lin; 94 (Dominican Republic) Steven Moya	Outfielders: 3 (Taiwan) Chen Wun-jie; 8 (Taiwan) Lin Wei-ha; 9 (Taiwan) Wang Po-jung; 13 (Taiwan) Sun Yi-shen; 24 (Taiwan) Ji Qing-ran; 37 (Taiwan) Yen Ching-hong; 50 (Taiwan) Kao Sheng-en; 73 (Taiwan) Yeh Pao-ti; 77 (Taiwan) Hong Wei-han; 87 (Taiwan) Pacidal Nikal; 88 (Taiwan) Lan Yin-lun	Manager: 2 (Taiwan) Hong I-chung; Coaches: 34 (Japan) Hisanori Yokota (pitching); 51 (Taiwan) Wu Chen-han (strength); 53 (Taiwan) Huang Kan-lin (outfield); 61 (Japan) Takafumi Sato (strength); 63 (Taiwan) Tsai Yu-hsiang (hitting); 68 (Taiwan) Teng Shih-yang (infield); 72 (Taiwan) Yeh Yung-chieh (bullpen); 76 (Taiwan) Chiu Chun-wen (infield/base running); 89 (Taiwan) Cheng Han-li (catching); 96 (Taiwan) Cheng Nai-wen (assistant hitting); Second team manager: 81 (Taiwan) Lin Chen-hsien; Second team coaches: 21 (Taiwan) Chung Cheng-yu (outfield/base running); 23 (Dominican Republic) Luis de los Santos (hitting); 35 (Taiwan) Shen Po-tsang (pitching); 38 (Taiwan) Hsiao Jen-wen (pitching); 65 (Taiwan) Tu Chuang-hsun (catching); 75 (Japan) Shungo Fukunaga (developmental); 83 (Taiwan) Lin Ta-chan (strength/running); 91 (Taiwan) Kuo Chien-lin (bench/infield); Roster updated on 27 March 2025
