= Steven Moya =

Puerto Rican baseball player (born 1991)

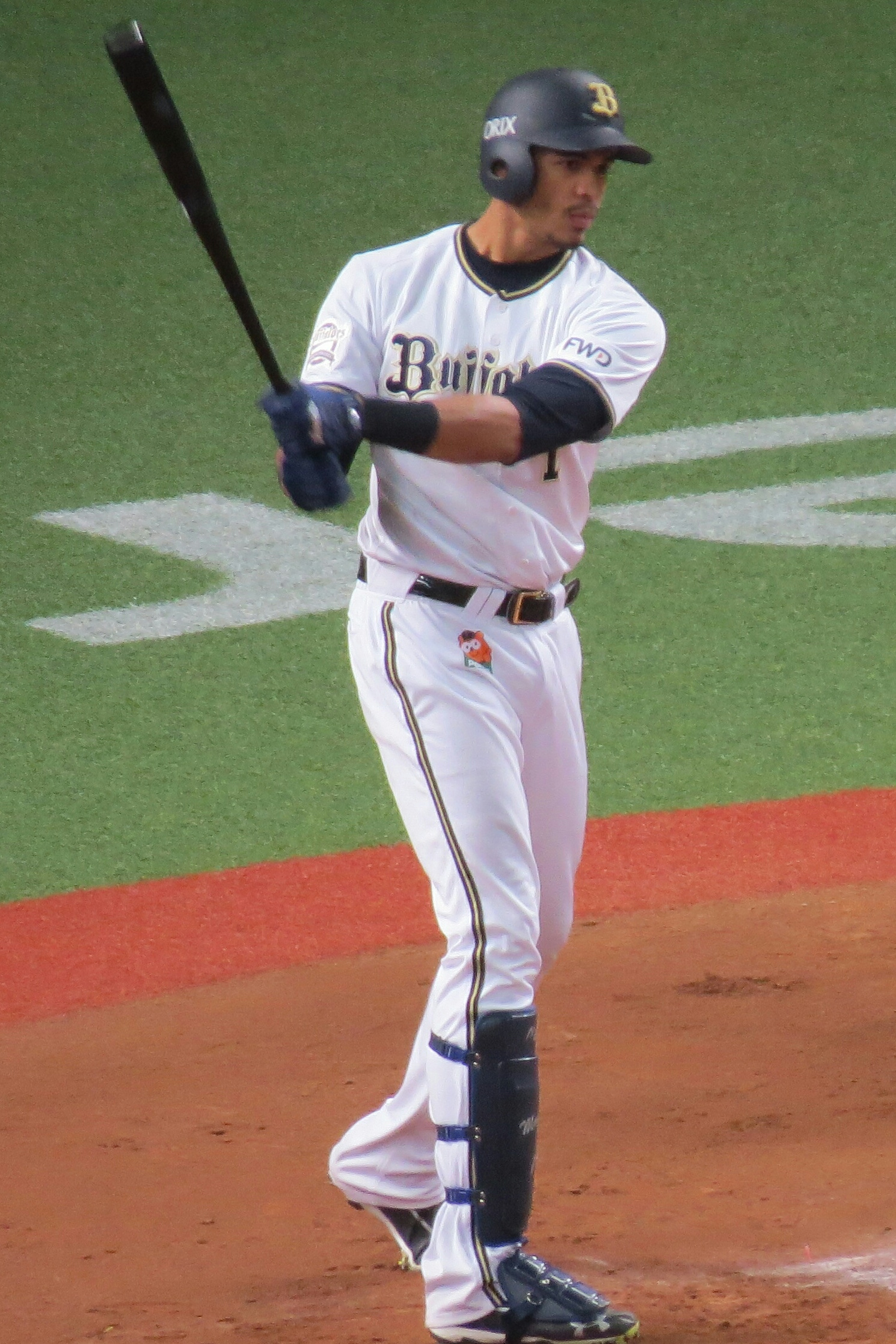
- Moya with the Orix Buffaloes

TSG Hawks – No. 94
- Right fielder / First baseman
- Born: August 9, 1991 (age 35); Río Piedras, Puerto Rico
- Bats: Left Throws: Right

Professional debut
- MLB: September 1, 2014, for the Detroit Tigers
- NPB: April 20, 2018, for the Chunichi Dragons
- CPBL: April 3, 2024, for the TSG Hawks

MLB statistics (through 2016 season)
- Batting average: .250
- Home runs: 5
- Runs batted in: 11

NPB statistics (through 2021 season)
- Batting average: .249
- Home runs: 39
- Runs batted in: 139

CPBL statistics (through April 16, 2026)
- Batting average: .302
- Home runs: 55
- Runs batted in: 183
- Stats at Baseball Reference

Teams
- Detroit Tigers (2014–2016); Chunichi Dragons (2018–2019); Orix Buffaloes (2019–2021); TSG Hawks (2024–present)

Career highlights and awards
- 2× CPBL Home Run leader (2024, 2025); CPBL RBI leader (2024); CPBL All-Star (2025)

Steven Moya (born August 9, 1991) is a Puerto Rican-born Dominican professional baseball outfielder for the TSG Hawks of the Chinese Professional Baseball League (CPBL). He has previously played in Major League Baseball (MLB) for the Detroit Tigers and in Nippon Professional Baseball (NPB) for the Chunichi Dragons and Orix Buffaloes.

== Career ==
=== Detroit Tigers ===
Moya signed with the Detroit Tigers as a non-drafted free agent in 2008. He made his professional debut with the Dominican Summer League Tigers, batting .252/.361/.372 with six home runs and 33 RBI in 60 games. The next year, he played for the Gulf Coast League Tigers, slashing .190/.229/.299 in 40 games. In 2011, Moya played for the Single-A West Michigan Whitecaps, hitting .204/.234/.362 with career-highs in home runs (13) and RBI (39).

In 2012, Moya had Tommy John surgery, which caused him to play in only 59 games for West Michigan that year. He spent the 2013 season with the High-A Lakeland Flying Tigers, posting a .255/.296/.433 slash line with 12 home runs and 55 RBI. Moya was added to the team's 40-man roster on November 20, 2013, in order to be protected from the Rule 5 draft.

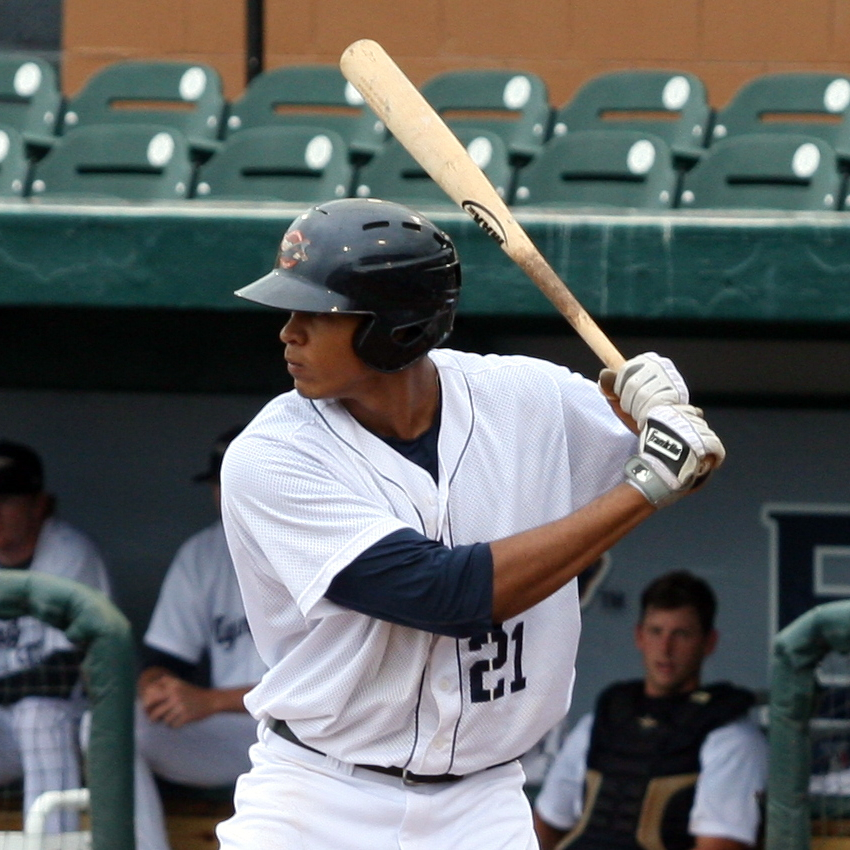
Moya batting for the Lakeland Flying Tigers in 2013

Moya started the 2014 season with the Double-A Erie SeaWolves. On June 24, it was announced Moya had been named to the All-Star Futures Game. Moya was named the Eastern League All-Star Game MVP after he hit a grand slam in the fifth inning.

On August 28, 2014, Moya was named the 2014 Eastern League Most Valuable Player. Moya finished the season batting .273 (142-for-515) with 33 doubles, three triples, 35 home runs, 105 RBI, 81 runs scored, 16 stolen bases, a .555 slugging percentage and a .306 on-base percentage in 133 games this season. Moya is the first SeaWolves player to be named the league's MVP since the SeaWolves entered the Eastern League in 1999. Moya set a new single-season franchise record for total bases (286), extra-base hits (71), home runs (35) and RBI (105). Moya was named the Detroit Tigers' minor league player of the year.

Moya batted .265 (39-for-147) from August 1 on with 12 doubles, five home runs and 19 RBI. He finished the season with the Mud Hens batting .240 (120-for-500) with 30 doubles, 20 home runs, 74 RBI, 27 walks and 162 strikeouts.

Moya made his major league debut on September 1, 2014, as a pinch hitter in the 9th inning, where he recorded a single in his first career at-bat off Austin Adams of the Cleveland Indians. Following the 2014 season, Moya went on to play for the Glendale Desert Dogs of the Arizona Fall League. In 23 games, he batted .289 with six doubles, one triple, five home runs, and 19 RBI. Moya was also named to the Arizona Fall League Rising Stars Game.

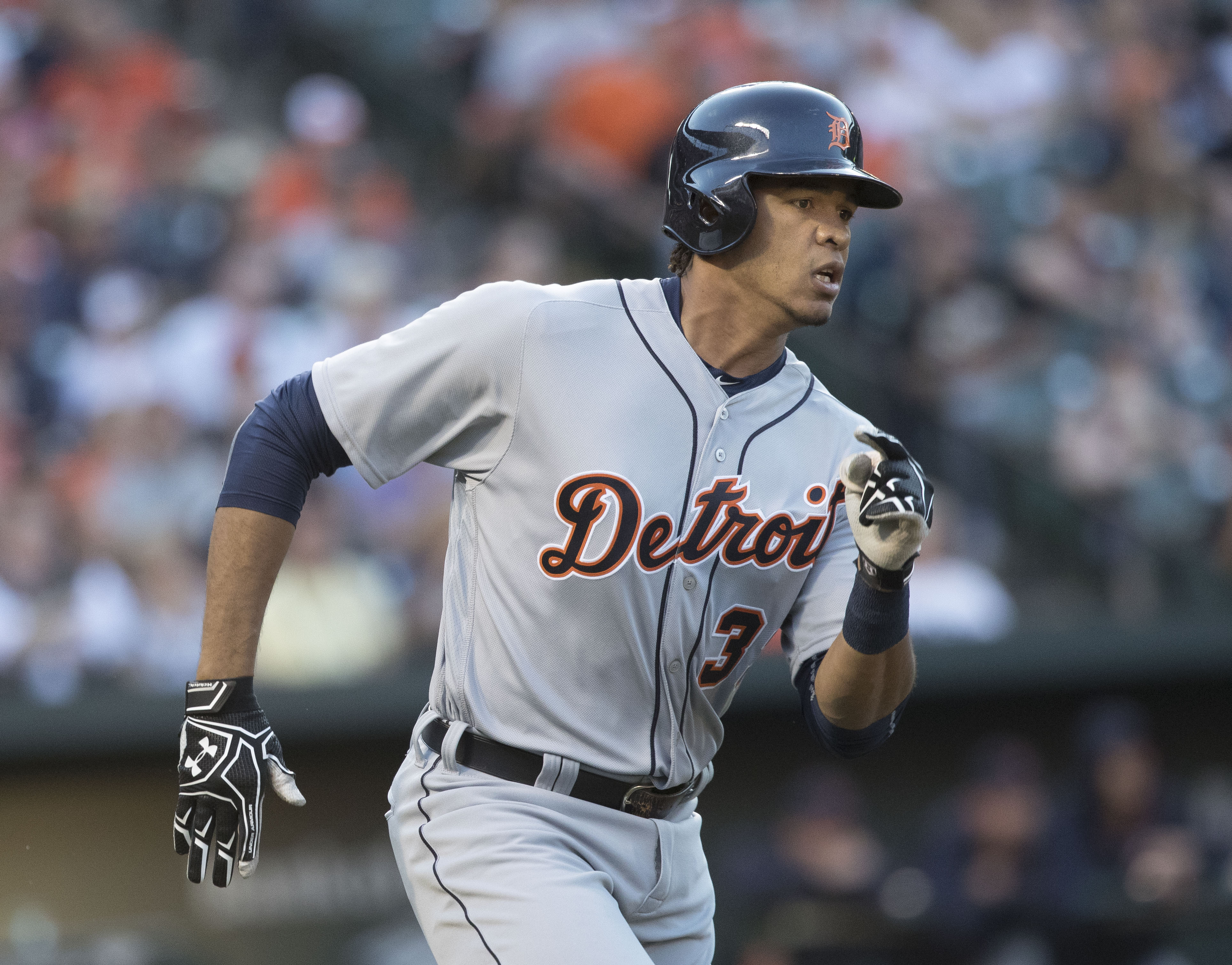
Moya with the Tigers

Moya was called up by the Tigers on September 8, 2015, as a September call-up. He was 4-for-25 in nine September games.

On March 26, 2016, Moya was optioned to the Triple-A Toledo Mud Hens. On May 12, he was recalled from Triple-A. He was optioned back to Toledo later on, but was recalled again on June 16, following an injury to the Tigers' starting right fielder, J. D. Martinez. Moya was optioned back to Toledo on July 17,. After batting .324 in June with four home runs, he was 3-for-23 in July and had some defensive lapses in right field. Manager Brad Ausmus stated he wanted Moya to work on his outfield defense in a "less stressful environment". Moya was removed from the 40-man roster and sent outright to Triple-A on March 31, 2017, and split the year between Triple-A Toledo and Double-A Erie, accumulating a .213/.272/.405 slash line with 18 home runs and 50 RBI. Moya elected free agency on November 6 and has not played a Major League game since.

=== Chunichi Dragons ===
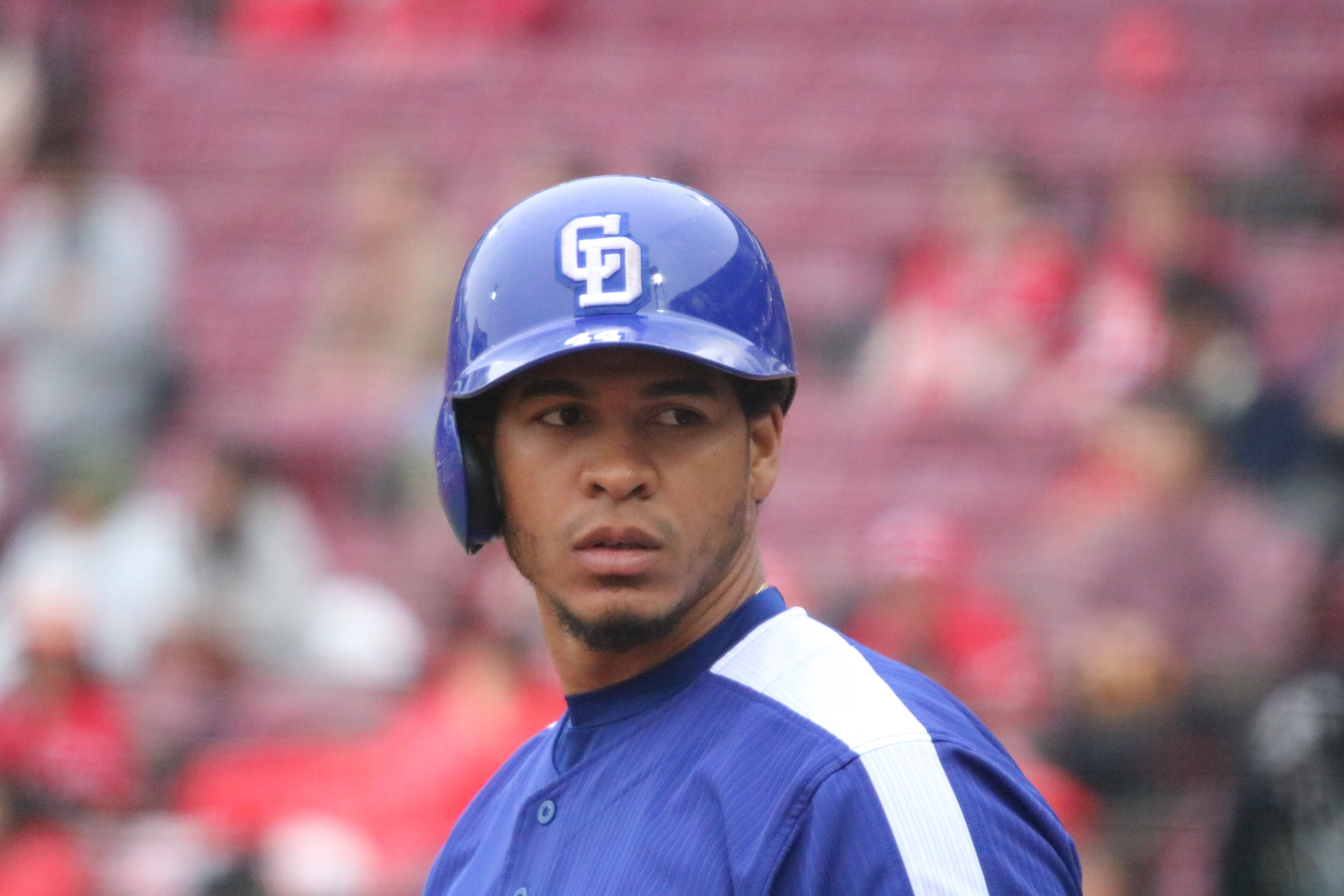
Moya with the Dragons

On December 1, 2017, Moya signed a one-year contract with the Chunichi Dragons of Nippon Professional Baseball (NPB). On April 20, 2018, he made his NPB debut. He finished his first NPB season with a slash line of .301/.347/.441 with 3 home runs and 16 RBI. In 7 games for the team in 2019, Moya went 5-for-22 with 1 home run and 3 RBI.

=== Orix Buffaloes ===
On June 30, 2019, it was announced that Moya had been traded to the Orix Buffaloes for cash. In 64 games for the team, Moya batted .244/.278/.397 with 10 home runs and 35 RBI. On December 20, 2019, Moya signed a 1-year extension to remain with the Buffaloes. In 2020 for Orix, Moya slashed .274/.324/.567 with 12 home runs and 38 RBI in 46 games for the club.

In the 2021 season, Moya played in 106 games for the Buffaloes. In 354 at-bats, he slashed .229/.261/.373 with 13 home runs and 47 RBI. He became a free agent following the year.

=== Toros de Tijuana ===
On January 6, 2022, Moya signed with the Toros de Tijuana of the Mexican League, however Moya did not play in any games.

=== Gastonia Honey Hunters ===
On March 7, 2023, Moya signed with the Gastonia Honey Hunters of the Atlantic League of Professional Baseball. In 11 games, Moya batted .432/.511/1.054 with 7 home runs and 19 RBIs. He was placed on the reserve list on May 16, 2023, in order to pursue an opportunity in Mexico.

=== Acereros de Monclova ===
On May 16, 2023, Moya signed with the Acereros de Monclova of the Mexican League. He played in 3 games for Monclova, going 2–for–9 (.222) with 1 home run, 2 RBI, and 2 walks.

=== Gastonia Honey Hunters (second stint) ===
On August 1, 2023, Moya signed with the Gastonia Honey Hunters of the Atlantic League of Professional Baseball.

=== TSG Hawks ===
On January 24, 2024, Moya signed with the TSG Hawks of the Chinese Professional Baseball League (CPBL) in Taiwan. In 115 games for TSG, he slashed .294/.367/.567 with 30 home runs and 99 RBI. He led the league in home runs. Following the season, Moya was named a CPBL Best Ten Award winner.

On December 17, 2024, Moya re-signed with the Hawks on a $575,000 contract. During the 2025 CPBL season, Moya was named a contestant in the league's Home Run Derby and All-Star game. He withdrew from the former not wishing to exacerbate a collarbone injury, and from the latter after the death of his wife. In 89 total appearances for the Hawks, Moya batted .305/.387/.589 with 25 home runs and 68 RBI.

On December 16, 2025, Moya re-signed with the Hawks on a one-year, $695,000 contract.

== Awards and accomplishments ==
- 2014 Eastern League All-Star Game MVP
- 2014 Eastern League MVP
- 2014 Arizona Fall League Top Prospects Team

== Personal life ==
Moya was born in Puerto Rico to Dominican parents, and when he was 2 months old, his family returned to the Dominican Republic.

Moya was married to Elizabeth Esmeralda. The couple had one child. Elizabeth died in July 2025.
