= Shih Chin-tien =

Taiwanese baseball player

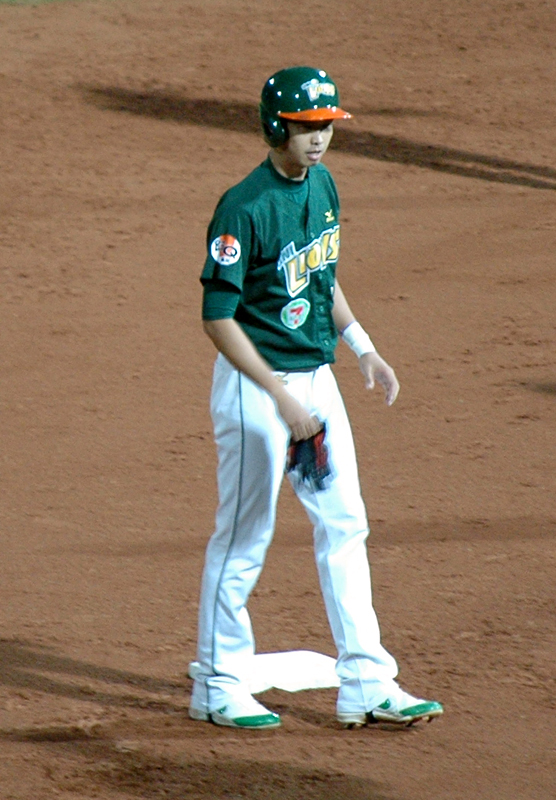

Fubon Guardians – No. 68
- Third baseman / Coach
- Bats: Left Throws: Right

CPBL debut
- 20 April, 2006, for the Uni-President Lions

Career statistics (through 2007)
- Games: 96
- Batting average: 0.259
- Hits: 64
- Home runs: 8
- RBIs: 23
- Stolen bases: 0
- Stats at Baseball Reference

Teams
- Uni-President Lions (2005 – 2010 )

Shih Chin-tien (Chinese: 施金典; pinyin: Shī Jīndiǎn; born 1 August 1980) is a Taiwanese baseball player who currently plays for Uni-President Lions of Chinese Professional Baseball League. He played as third baseman for the Lions.

== See also ==
- Chinese Professional Baseball League
- Uni-President Lions
