= Fubon Guardians =

Professional baseball team in Taiwan

- 富邦悍將

Logo	Cap insignia

Information
- League: Chinese Professional Baseball League
- Location: New Taipei City
- Ballpark: Xinzhuang Baseball Stadium
- Founded: 1993; 33 years ago
- Taiwan Series championships: 2004; 2005; 2016
- Playoff berths: 1998; 2000; 2003; 2004; 2005; 2006; 2010; 2013; 2016; 2018
- Former name: Jungo Bears (1993–1995); Sinon Bears (1996); Sinon Bulls (1996–2012); EDA Rhinos (2013–2016)
- Colors: Blue
- Mascot: Frankie, Bonnie
- Retired numbers: 39
- Ownership: Fubon Financial Holding Co.
- President: Tsai Cheng-tao
- General manager: Joyce Chen
- Manager: Mitsutaka Goto
- Website: Official Website

Current uniforms
Home	Away

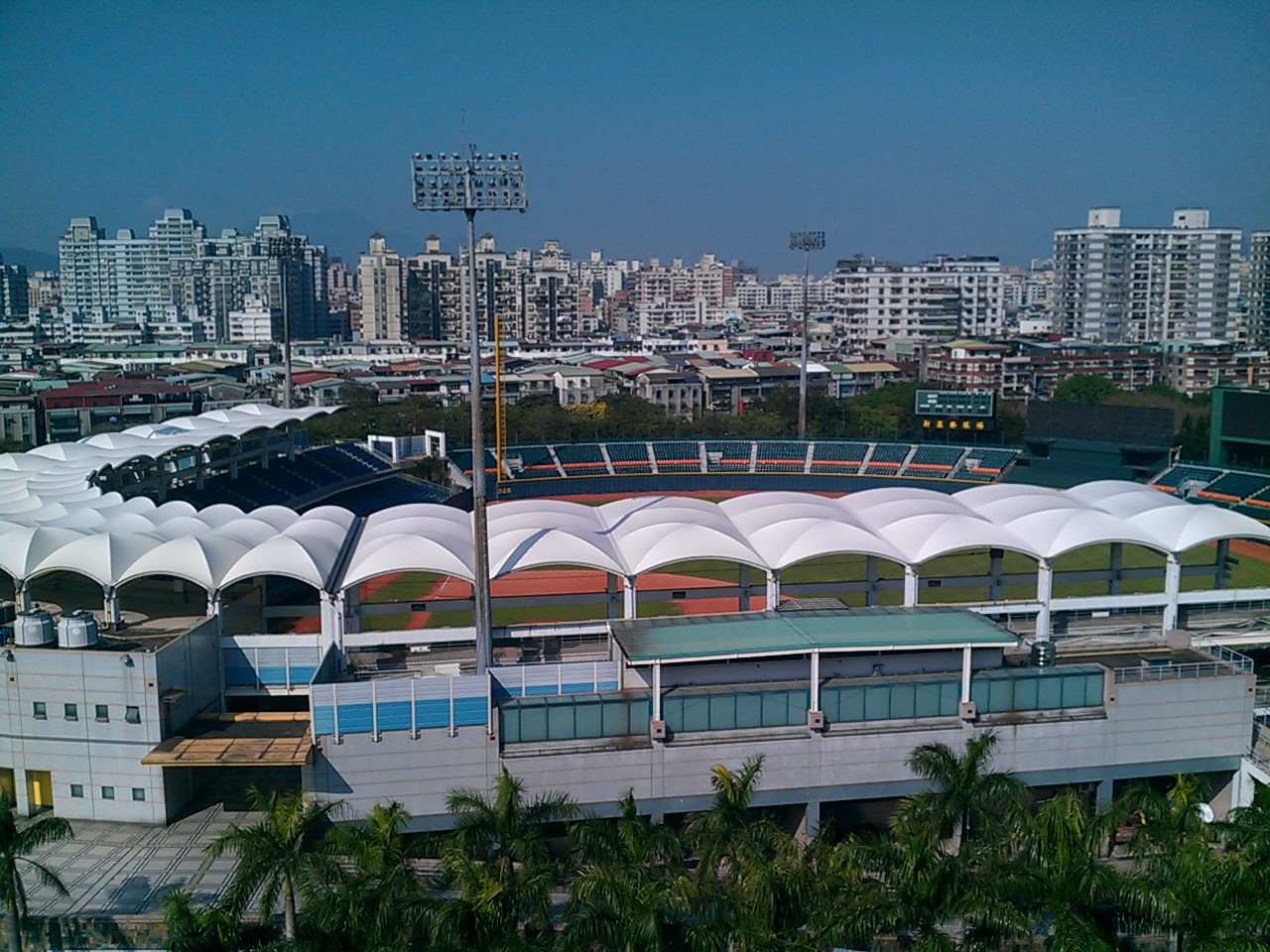
Xinzhuang Baseball Stadium

The Fubon Guardians (Chinese: 富邦悍將) are a professional baseball team in the Chinese Professional Baseball League (CPBL) in Taiwan. The team is owned by Fubon Financial Holding Co. and plays its home games at Xinzhuang Baseball Stadium in New Taipei City. The team has had the Guardians name since 2017, with the franchise previously known as the Jungo Bears, Sinon Bulls, and EDA Rhinos.

== History ==
=== The Jungo Era (1993–1995) ===
The Jungo Bears (Chinese: 俊國熊) existed in the Chinese Professional Baseball League (CPBL) between 1993 and 1995. Originally formed as an amateur club by the Taichung-based Jungo Corporation in 1989, this club was professionalized in 1992 after absorbing a group of players from the Chinese Taipei national baseball team who just won the silver medal in the 1992 Summer Olympics, similar to its sister team China Times Eagles. This club took Taichung Baseball Field as its home throughout its history.

Despite a nice start, this club had been performing poorly throughout its short history, mainly due to the controversial leading styles of Jungo Corporation's then chairman Chen I-ping (陳一平). After a chain of rows over TV broadcast rights and the distribution of TV broadcast royalties, in November 1995 the other 5 teams of CPBL expelled Chen I-ping and Jungo Corporation's all legal rights inside CPBL. The Sinon Corporation took over this team and renamed it as Sinon Bears, which was later renamed again as Sinon Bulls in June 1996. Later in 1999 Chen I-ping and Jungo Corporation sought to sponsor Taiwan Major League (TML)'s Taichung Agan but TML did not respond.

=== Sinon Bulls (1996–2012) ===
The Sinon Bulls (Chinese: 興農牛) were founded in 1996 and are owned by the Taichung-based Sinon Corporation, which is known for its agricultural product lines, insurance, and supermarket chains through Central Taiwan. After a poor first season, the Bulls managed a winning record for the first time in second half of the 1997 season, and achieved the feat for a full season for the first time in 1998. In this season, the Bulls made it to the championship series for the first time, losing to the Wei Chuan Dragons four games to three. Sinon would advance to the finals in 2000 and 2003 as well, losing both times.

It was in 2004 that the Bulls finally made their breakthrough with a come-from-behind seven-game series win. They made it back-to-back Taiwan Series wins with a sweep of the Macoto Cobras the following year, their third consecutive trip to the championship series. The Bulls made the playoffs four years in a row (2003–2006), a CPBL record they shared with the Wei Chuan Dragons, who also appeared in four consecutive playoff rounds from 1996 to 1999.

The Bulls also participated in the first annual Konami Cup Asia Series in Japan following its Taiwan Series victory in 2005. While defeating a team of all-stars from the Chinese league, they lost to the champions of Japan and South Korea en route to a 1–2 showing.

At the end of the 2012 season, Sinon Corporation announced its intention to sell the team. By late December, an agreement was reached between Sinon Corporation and E-United Group, and the team was renamed EDA Rhinos after E-DA World, a large shopping, entertainment and hotel complex in Kaohsiung operated by E-United Group.

=== EDA Rhinos (2013–2016) ===
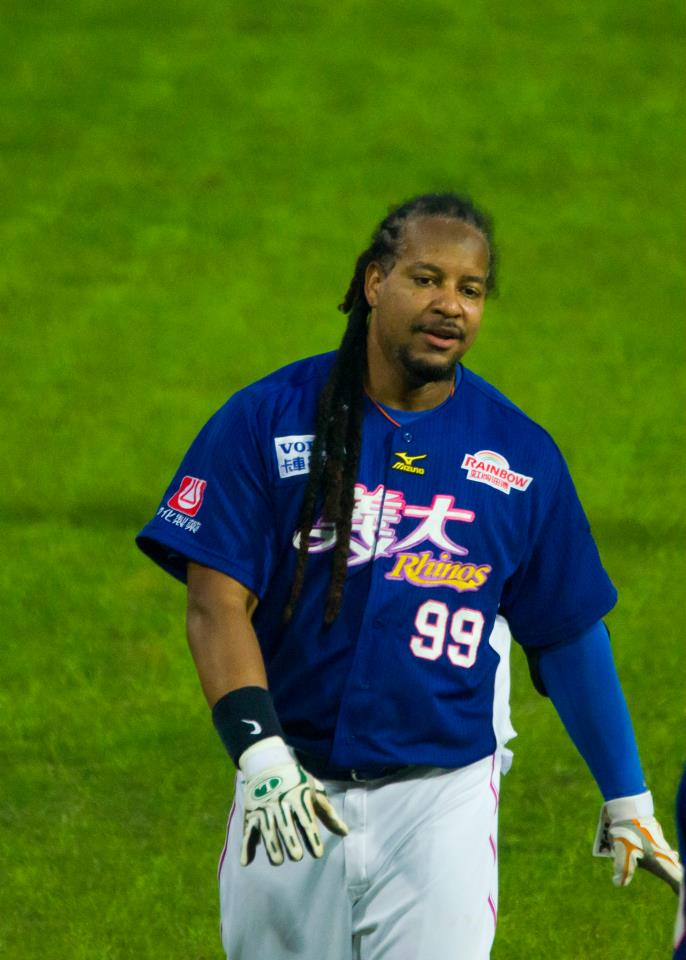
Manny Ramirez played for the then named EDA Rhinos in 2013.

The EDA Rhinos (Chinese: 義大犀牛) intends to play games at both Li De Baseball Stadium in downtown Kaohsiung and Chengcing Lake Baseball Field in the suburb during the upcoming 2013 CPBL season. The Rhinos also signaled in signing Manny Ramirez for 2013 as its billboard player. Taiwanese former MLB player Chin-lung Hu also signed with the team following 2013 CPBL Draft.

In June 2016 it was announced that the E-United Group are willing to sell the team. The team won the second stage of the 2016 CPBL season and qualified to the Taiwan Series, where they defeated Chinatrust Brothers 4–2 to win their first championship since 2005.

=== Fubon Guardians (2017–present) ===
In November 2016, the team was renamed as Fubon Guardians (Chinese: 富邦悍將) after Fubon Financial Holding Co. bought the team.

== Records ==
Qualified for playoffs	Taiwan Series Championship

=== Regular seasons ===
Season	Wins	Losses	Ties	Winning pct.	Place
Jungo Bears
1993	40 (21/19)	47 (24/23)	3 (0/3)	.460 (.467/.452)	4 (4/4)
1994	29 (14/15)	59 (31/28)	2 (0/2)	.330 (.311/.349)	6 (6/6)
1995	40 (19/21)	58 (30/28)	2 (1/1)	.408 (.388/.429)	6 (6/6)
Sinon Bulls
1996	28 (14/14)	69 (36/33)	3 (0/3)	.289 (.280/.298)	6 (6/6)
1997	45 (20/25)	48 (26/22)	3 (2/1)	.484 (.435/.532)	3 (5/3)
1998	58	45	2	0.563	1
1999	30	61	2	0.330	6
2000	51 (27/24)	38 (17/21)	1 (1/0)	.573 (.614/.533)	1 (1/2)
2001	34 (17/17)	51(25/26)	5 (3/2)	.400 (.405/395)	4 (4/4)
2002	44 (21/23)	45 (23/22)	1 (1/0)	.494 (.477/.511)	3 (3/3)
2003	62 (34/28)	32 (15/17)	6 (1/5)	.660 (.695/.622)	2 (1/3)
2004	52 (25/27)	43 (22/21)	5 (3/2)	.547 (.532/.563)	2 (2/1)
2005	53 (28/25)	42 (21/21)	6 (2/4)	.558 (.571/.543)	1 (2/1)
2006	48 (25/23)	49 (23/26)	3 (2/1)	.495 (.521/.469)	3 (3/3)
2007	42 (24/18)	57 (25/32)	1 (1/0)	.424 (.490/390)	6 (4/6)
2008	37 (19/18)	62 (30/32)	1 (1/0)	.374 (.388/.360)	6 (6/5)
2009	57 (29/28)	60 (29/31)	3 (2/1)	.487 (.500/.475)	3 (3/3)
2010	65 (36/29)	53 (23/30)	2 (1/1)	.551 (.610/.492)	1 (1/3)
2011	45 (20/25)	72 (38/34)	3 (2/1)	.385 (.345/.424)	4 (4/4)
2012	38 (22/16)	77 (35/42)	5 (3/2)	.330 (.386/.276)	4 (4/4)
EDA Rhinos
2013	62 (35/27)	57 (24/33)	1 (1/0)	.521 (.593/.450)	2 (1/4)
2014	58 (26/32)	60 (33/27)	2 (1/1)	.492 (.441/.542)	3 (3/2)
2015	58 (29/29)	61 (30/31)	1 (1/0)	.487 (.492/.475)	3 (2/3)
2016	61 (27/34)	58 (33/25)	1 (0/1)	.513 (.450/.576)	2 (4/1)
Fubon Guardians
2017	48 (20/28)	70 (38/32)	2 (2/0)	.407 (.345/.467)	4 (4/3)
2018	54 (27/27)	66 (33/33)	0 (0/0)	.450 (.450/.450)	3 (3/4)
2019	63 (31/32)	55 (27/28)	2 (2/0)	.534 (.534/.533)	1 (2/2)
2020	54 (23/31)	65 (37/28)	1 (0/1)	.454 (.383/.525)	4 (4/2)
2021	54 (28/26)	62 (31/31)	4 (1/3)	.466 (.475/.456)	4 (4/4)
2022	46 (16/30)	70 (43/27)	4 (1/3)	.397 (.271/.526)	5 (5/3)
2023	48 (21/27)	67 (35/32)	5 (4/1)	.417 (.375/.458)	5 (5/5)
2024	53 (29/24)	66 (31/35)	1 (0/1)	.445 (.483/.407)	5 (4/6)
2025	46 (21/25)	74 (39/35)	0 (0/0)	.383 (.350/.417)	6 (6/6)
2026	59 (34/25)	61 (26/35)	0 (0/0)	.492 (.567/.417)	3 (2/5)

=== Playoffs ===
Season	First round			Taiwan Series		
Season	Opponent	Wins	Losses	Opponent	Wins	Losses
Sinon Bulls
1998	Did not play			Wei Chuan Dragons	3	4
2000	Did not play			Uni-President Lions	3	4
2003	Did not play			Brother Elephants	2	4
2004	Did not play			Uni-President Lions	4	3
2005	Did not play			Macoto Cobras	4	0
2006	Uni-President Lions	0	3	Eliminated		
2010	Did not play			Brother Elephants	0	4
EDA Rhinos
2013	Did not play			Uni-President 7-Eleven Lions	0	4
2016	Did not play			Chinatrust Brothers	4	2
Fubon Guardians
2018	Uni-President 7-Eleven Lions	1	3	Eliminated		

=== Asia Series ===
Year	Round robin			Championship round	
Year	Wins	Losses	Standing	Opponent	Result
Sinon Bulls
2005	1	2	3	Eliminated	
EDA Rhinos
2013	0	2	3	Eliminated	

== Roster ==
Fubon Guardians roster
Players			Coaches
Pitchers: 12 (Taiwan) Chiang Kuo-hao; 13 (Taiwan) Liao Jen-lei; 15 (Taiwan) Fan Po-chieh; 16 (Taiwan) Pan Yi-cheng; 17 (Taiwan) Huang Tzu-chen; 18 (Taiwan) Huang Pao-lo; 19 (Taiwan) Chang Yi; 21 (Taiwan) Lan Kai-ching; 23 (Japan) Ryo Negishi; 25 (Taiwan) Lai Chih-yuan; 30 (Taiwan) Chen Wei-lin; 32 (Taiwan) Lai Hung-cheng; 34 (Taiwan) Wang Wei-yong; 37 (Japan) Isaki Ninomiya; 38 (Taiwan) Li Wu Yung-qin; 44 (United States) Shawn Morimando; 48 (Taiwan) Yue Shao-hua; 49 (Taiwan) Huang Ying-chi; 50 (Taiwan) Wu Shih-hao; 54 (Taiwan) Lee Chien-hsun; 55 (Cuba) Roenis Elías; 57 (Taiwan) Ou Su-chen; 58 (Taiwan) Chen Sheng-wen; 60 (Taiwan) Tseng Jyun-yue; 66 (Taiwan) Li Tung-ming; 71 (Taiwan) Chiang Shao-ching; 72 (Taiwan) Chang Jui-ling; 73 (Taiwan) Lin Wang-shi; 75 (Taiwan) Chen Yi-chung; 76 (Taiwan) Lee Yu-hsien; 80 (Taiwan) Yu Ting-wei; 81 (Taiwan) Chen Shih-peng; 84 (United States) Rio Gomez; 87 (Venezuela) Enderson Franco; 89 (Taiwan) Lin Yu-chen; 94 (Taiwan) Lin Zhen-cheng; 96 (Taiwan) Kuo Tai-cheng; 00 (Taiwan) Chen Ping-hong	Catchers: 10 (Taiwan) Yang Hao-ran; 11 (Taiwan) Yao Kuan-wei; 43 (Taiwan) Li Wei; 47 (Taiwan) Chang Chin-te; 59 (Taiwan) Wei Chuan; 61 (Taiwan) Siao Yi-ming; 83 (Taiwan) Lu Bo-hua; 95 (Taiwan) Dai Pei-feng; Infielders: 2 (Taiwan) Lin Ze-bin; 3 (Taiwan) Haro Ngayaw; 4 (Taiwan) Kao Jie; 5 (Taiwan) Wang Nian-hao; 6 (Taiwan) Yeh Tzu-ting; 22 (Taiwan) Lee Tsung-hsien; 31 (Taiwan) Huang Zhao-wei; 46 (Taiwan) Fan Kuo-chen; 56 (Taiwan) Chen Kai-yu; 62 (Taiwan) Lin Yue-ku; 63 (Taiwan) Yang Min-yi; 67 (Taiwan) Hsin Yuan-hsu; 78 (Taiwan) Tung Tzu-en; 85 (Taiwan) Liu Chun-hao; 97 (Taiwan) Chih En-chi; 98 (Taiwan) Kao Kuo-lin; 99 (Taiwan) Chang Yu-cheng	Outfielders: 0 (Taiwan) Pan Wei-siang; 1 (Taiwan) Lin Che-hsuan; 7 (Taiwan) Chen Chen; 9 (Taiwan) Lin Ting-yu; 14 (Taiwan) Wang Yi-cheng; 29 (Taiwan) Shen Hao-wei; 33 (Taiwan) Chang Ming-yu; 35 (Taiwan) Wang Cheng-tang; 65 (Taiwan) Tsai Chia-yen; 77 (Taiwan) Chou Chia-le; 82 (Taiwan) Kung Nien-en	Manager: 52 (Taiwan) Chen Chin-feng; Coaches: 8 (Taiwan) Chan Chih-yao (outfield); 20 (Taiwan) Lin Kun-sheng (battery); 36 (Taiwan) Tsai Chien-wei (hitting); 40 (Taiwan) Kuo Yung-chih (pitching); 45 (Taiwan) Yeh Chu-hsuan (infield); 53 (Taiwan) Du Zheng-wen (strength); 68 (Taiwan) Shih Chin-tien (infield); 70 (Taiwan) Chen Lien-hung (bench); 88 (United States) Charles Poe (hitting); 91 (Taiwan) Hsu Ming-chieh (bullpen); 92 (Taiwan) Chen Po-ying (strength and conditioning); Second team manager: 51 (Japan) Mitsutaka Goto; Second team coaches: 26 (Taiwan) Chen Pin-chieh (hitting/base running); 27 (Taiwan) Huang Hao-jan (battery); 28 (Taiwan) Kao Kuo-hui (hitting); 41 (Taiwan) Liu Bao-xian (assistant strength); 42 (Taiwan) Lin Cheng-feng (bullpen); 79 (Japan) Takeshi Shimazaki (pitching); 86 (Japan) Jumpei Nemoto (strength); 90 (Taiwan) Liao Kang-chih (pitching); 93 (Taiwan) Hsu Yu-cheng (outfield); Roster updated on 27 March 2025

=== Retired numbers ===
- 39 (United States) Mike Loree

=== List of managers ===
==== Jungo Bears (1993–1995) ====
No.	Name	Years	Playoffs	Championships
1	Takashi Teraoka	1993	0	0
2	Chen Hsiu-hsiung	1994	0	0
–	Takashi Teraoka	1994	0	0
3	Tsai Jung-tsung	1994	0	0
4	Masuho Maeda	1995	0	0
5	Wu Hsiang-mu	1995	0	0

==== Sinon Bears/Bulls (1996–2012) ====
No.	Name	Years	Playoffs	Championships
–	Wu Hsiang-mu	1996	0	0
6	Kim Yong-un	1996–1997	0	0
7	Wang Chun-lang	1997–2001	2	0
8	Chen Wei-cheng	2002–2004	1	0
9	Liu Jung-hua	2004–2006	3	2
10	Huang Chung-yi	2007	0	0
11	Hu Chang-hao	2007–2008	0	0
12	Hsu Sheng-ming	2008–2010	1	0
–	Liu Jung-hua	2011–2012	0	0

==== EDA Rhinos (2013–2016) ====
No.	Name	Years	Playoffs	Championships
–	Hsu Sheng-ming	2013	0	0
13	Tseng Chih-chen	2013	1	0
14	Dallas Williams	2014	0	0
15	Von Joshua	2014–2015	0	0
16	Yeh Chun-chang	2015–2016	1	1

==== Fubon Guardians (2017–present) ====
No.	Name	Years	Playoffs	Championships
–	Yeh Chun-chang	2016–2018	0	0
17	Chen Lien-hung	2018–2019	1	0
18	Hong I-chung	2020–2021	0	0
19	Chiu Chang-jung	2021–2023	0	0
20	Chen Chin-feng	2024–2025	0	0
21	Mitsutaka Goto	2026–present	0	0
