= Decoy (dog) =

Dog owned by Shohei Ohtani

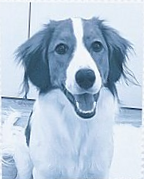
- Decoy's United States visa photograph
- Other name: Dekopin
- Species: Canis familiaris
- Breed: Kooikerhondje
- Born: May 15, 2023 (age 3)
- Owner: Shohei Ohtani

Decoy (born May 15, 2023), known in Japanese as Dekopin (デコピン), is a Kooikerhondje owned by Japanese baseball player Shohei Ohtani. He is a fixture in the Los Angeles Dodgers fandom and has been described as the team's "Most Valuable Pet". He has also featured in merchandise and was granted an honorary visa by the Embassy of the United States in Tokyo.

== Biography ==
Shohei Ohtani held Decoy in his lap when he won his second Major League Baseball Most Valuable Player award in November 2023. Upon winning, Ohtani gave the dog a high five, and he became viral among fans. The next month, Shohei Ohtani publicly revealed the dog's name, Dekopin, which is a Japanese term referring to the act of flicking a person on the forehead. He also clarified that Dekopin's name in English is Decoy, which was chosen because he believed that some Americans might struggle to pronounce the Japanese name.

In January 2024, Shohei and Decoy visited the Embassy of the United States in Tokyo, where Decoy was granted an honorary travel visa by Rahm Emanuel. In August 2024, Decoy threw the ceremonial first pitch at the Dodger Stadium. To celebrate the event, the Dodgers held a giveaway of bobblehead toys depicting Shohei with Decoy. Decoy would go on to appear at the Dodgers' victory parade in November 2024 where he interacted with young fans. That month, he also appeared in a video alongside Mamiko Tanaka celebrating Shohei Ohtani's third Most Valuable Player award. In December 2024, Decoy met with celebrity chef Nobu Matsuhisa and posed with him for photographs. In 2025, Shohei Ohtani was added as a playable skin in the video game Fortnite, accompanied by an in-game bobblehead depicting Decoy. In the game, the Decoy bobblehead can be used in an emote to throw baseballs for Shohei to hit.

Ohtani's $7.85 million home purchase was conducted through an LLC named "Decopin," a tribute to his pet dog.

== See also ==
- List of individual dogs
