= Shohei Ohtani =

Japanese baseball player (born 1994)

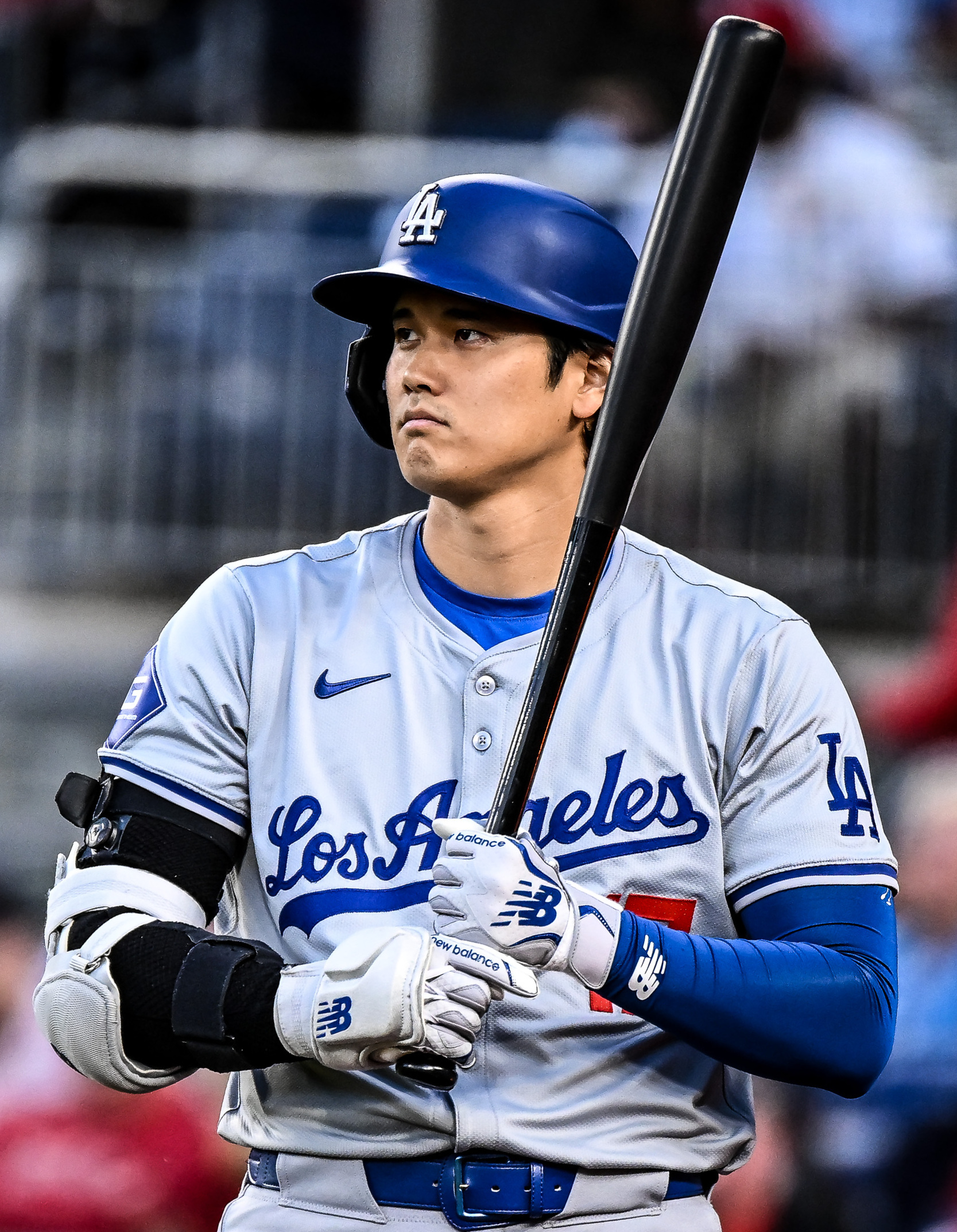
- Ohtani with the Los Angeles Dodgers in 2024

Los Angeles Dodgers – No. 17
- Designated hitter / Pitcher
- Born: July 5, 1994 (age 32); Mizusawa, Iwate, Japan
- Bats: Left Throws: Right

Professional debut
- NPB: March 29, 2013, for the Hokkaidō Nippon-Ham Fighters
- MLB: March 29, 2018, for the Los Angeles Angels

NPB statistics (through 2017 season)
- Batting average: .284
- Hits: 297
- Home runs: 48
- Runs batted in: 166
- Stolen bases: 13
- Win–loss record: 42–15
- Earned run average: 2.52
- Strikeouts: 624

MLB statistics (through 2026 season)
- Batting average: .281
- Hits: 1,194
- Home runs: 310
- Runs batted in: 750
- Stolen bases: 176
- Win–loss record: 47–22
- Earned run average: 2.83
- Strikeouts: 765
- Stats at Baseball Reference

Teams
- Hokkaido Nippon-Ham Fighters (2013–2017); Los Angeles Angels (2018–2023); Los Angeles Dodgers (2024–present)

Career highlights and awards
- NPB: 5× All-Star (2013–2017); Japan Series champion (2016); Pacific League MVP (2016); NPB All-Star Game MVP (2016 Game 2); 3× Best Nine Award (2015–2016²) (Note: In 2016, Ohtani became the first player in NPB history to receive the Best Nine Award as both a pitcher and a hitter.); Best Battery Award (2015) (Note: Shared with Shōta Ōno.); Pacific League ERA leader (2015); MLB: 6× All-Star (2021–2026); 2× World Series champion (2024, 2025); 4× MVP (2021, 2023–2025) (Note: Won the American League award in 2021 and 2023 and the National League award in 2024 and 2025.); 6× All-MLB First Team (2021–2025) (Note: In 2023, Ohtani became the first player in MLB history to be selected to the First Team as both a DH and SP in the same season.); AL Rookie of the Year (2018); NLCS MVP (2025); 4× Silver Slugger Award (2021, 2023–2025); 3× Hank Aaron Award (2023–2025); 2× Home run leader (2023, 2024); NL RBI leader (2024); Commissioner's Historic Achievement Award (2021); Team Japan: World Baseball Classic MVP (2023); 3× Japan Professional Sports Grand Prize (2016, 2018, 2023) (Note: In 2023, Ohtani won the award as a member of the Japan national baseball team.)
Medals
Men's baseball
Representing Japan
World Baseball Classic
Gold medal – first place	2023 Miami	Team
WBSC Premier12
Bronze medal – third place	2015 Tokyo	Team

Shohei Ohtani
- Ohtani's name in kanji

Japanese name
- Kanji: 大谷 翔平
- Hiragana: おおたに しょうへい
Transcriptions
- Romanization: Ōtani Shōhei

Shohei Ohtani (Note: Hepburn: Ōtani Shōhei, pronounced [oːtaɲi ɕoːheː], /ˈʃoʊheɪ oʊˌtɑːniː/ SHOH-hey oh-TAH-nee) (Note: His surname is sometimes spelled Otani as a common simplified form, Ootani based on the kana spelling, or Ōtani based on Hepburn romanization.) (Japanese: 大谷 翔平, born July 5, 1994) is a Japanese professional baseball designated hitter and pitcher for the Los Angeles Dodgers of Major League Baseball (MLB). Nicknamed "Shotime", he has previously played in MLB for the Los Angeles Angels and in Nippon Professional Baseball (NPB) for the Hokkaido Nippon-Ham Fighters. Because of his contributions as a hitter and as a pitcher, which make him a rare two-way player, Ohtani's prime seasons have been considered among the greatest in baseball history, with some likening them to the early career of Babe Ruth.

Considered early on as an elite two-way player, Ohtani was the first pick of the Fighters in the 2012 NPB draft. He played for the Fighters from 2013 through 2017 as a pitcher and an outfielder and won the 2016 Japan Series with them. The Fighters posted Ohtani to MLB after the 2017 season, and he signed with the Angels, soon winning the 2018 American League (AL) Rookie of the Year Award. Following an injury-plagued 2019 and 2020, Ohtani hit 46 home runs and struck out 156 batters en route to winning his first AL Most Valuable Player Award (MVP) in 2021. For his statistically unprecedented two-way season, Ohtani received the Commissioner's Historic Achievement Award. (Note: Ohtani recorded over 100 runs, RBIs and hits as a batter, while recording over 100 innings thrown and strikeouts as a pitcher. No player had made 10 starts and hit 30 home runs, or hit 10 home runs while striking out 100 batters in the same season before in MLB history.) In 2022, he became the first player in the modern era to qualify for both the hitting and pitching leaderboards in one season, finishing third in the AL with 219 strikeouts as a pitcher. (Note: He reached the thresholds of 3.1 plate appearances and one inning pitched per team game with 586 at-bats and 166 innings pitched.)

Ohtani won his second unanimous AL MVP in 2023, leading the AL with 44 home runs while recording 10 wins as a pitcher. He became the first player to win multiple unanimous MVPs and the first Japanese-born player to win a league home run title. After the 2023 season, Ohtani signed a 10-year, $700 million contract with the Dodgers, the largest contract in professional sports history at the time. Unable to pitch in 2024 while recovering from a second elbow injury, Ohtani played only as a DH for the Dodgers. He was unanimously named the 2024 National League (NL) MVP after becoming the first player in MLB history to record 50 home runs and 50 stolen bases in a season and won the 2024 World Series in his first MLB postseason appearance. (Note: Ohtani joined Frank Robinson as the only players to win the MVP award in both leagues and became the first DH to win the award in MLB history.) Ohtani returned to pitching in 2025 and set a Dodgers franchise record with 55 home runs in a season, winning his second consecutive NL MVP unanimously and becoming the only player to win multiple MVP awards in each league. He was named the 2025 NLCS MVP after hitting three home runs and pitching six shutout innings with 10 strikeouts in Game 4 (Note: No player had struck out even five batters where they hit three home runs in any MLB game. No player had hit more than two home runs in a career in games they pitched before in MLB history.) en route to capturing back-to-back championships in the 2025 World Series. Since 2023, Ohtani's jerseys have sold more than any other in the U.S., Japan and worldwide.

Internationally, Ohtani represents Japan. At the 2023 World Baseball Classic, he led Team Japan to their third championship and was named the tournament's MVP. The 2023 final against the United States was one of the most-watched baseball games in history, culminating in Ohtani striking out Angels teammate and U.S. captain Mike Trout on a full count, securing a 3–2 win.

Ohtani was awarded AP Male Athlete of the Year four times in 2021, 2023, 2024 and 2025. He was named one of Time's 100 most influential people in the world in 2021 and has been listed by Forbes as one of the world's ten highest-paid athletes in 2025 and 2026.

== Early life ==
Ohtani was born on July 5, 1994, in Mizusawa (now part of Ōshū), Iwate, Japan, to Kayoko and Toru Ohtani. His mother Kayoko was a national-level badminton player in high school and his father Tōru (徹), who worked at a local automobile manufacturing plant, was an amateur baseball player who played in the Japanese Industrial League.

Ohtani is the youngest of three children. He has one older sister, Yuka, and one older brother, Ryuta (龍太), who is also an amateur baseball player in the Japanese Industrial League.

In Japan, Ohtani was known as a "yakyū shōnen" (野球少年; "baseball boy")—a kid who lives, eats and breathes baseball. Coached by his father, he displayed an aptitude for the game at an early age. He began playing baseball in his second year of elementary school, and as a seventh-grader, Ohtani recorded all but one of 18 outs in a six-inning regional championship game.

== Amateur career ==
As a teenager, Ohtani could have played baseball for any powerhouse high school team in big cities such as Osaka or Yokohama. Instead, he opted to stay local, selecting Hanamaki Higashi High School in Iwate Prefecture, the same high school as pitcher Yusei Kikuchi, whom he admired; Ohtani competed there as a swimmer and played baseball. Ohtani's high school baseball coach, Hiroshi Sasaki, said that he was a fast swimmer who could have competed in the Olympics.

Under Sasaki's guidance, Hanamaki Higashi's players lived on campus, returning home for only six days a year. Sasaki would assign toilet cleaning chores to Ohtani, to teach him humility. In 2012, Ohtani threw a 99 mph (160 km/h) fastball as an 18-year-old high school pitcher, which at the time, had set a Japanese high school baseball record until it was surpassed by Rōki Sasaki's 101 mph (163 km/h) fastball in 2018. Ohtani threw the pitch in the Japanese national high school baseball championship tournament, commonly called Summer Koshien. In the 2012 18U Baseball World Championship, Ohtani had an 0–1 win–loss record with 16 strikeouts, eight walks, five hits, five runs, and a 4.35 earned run average (ERA) in 10 1/3 innings pitched.

== Professional career ==
Ohtani expressed a desire to play in Major League Baseball (MLB) directly after high school and attracted attention from several teams, including the Boston Red Sox, Los Angeles Dodgers, New York Yankees, and Texas Rangers. On October 21, 2012, he announced his decision to pursue a career in MLB rather than turn professional in Japan. The Hokkaido Nippon-Ham Fighters selected Ohtani in the 2012 NPB draft despite the strong possibility that he would not join the club. After an exclusive negotiating period, he agreed to sign with the Fighters with the intention of playing several seasons in Nippon Professional Baseball (NPB) before a potential move to MLB. The Fighters indicated that they would allow Ohtani to play as both a pitcher and a position player, whereas the Dodgers, regarded as his preferred MLB destination, were not willing to use him in a two-way role. This opportunity ultimately convinced him to remain in Japan. Upon joining the Fighters, Ohtani was assigned the No. 11 jersey, which had previously been worn by pitcher Yu Darvish.

=== Hokkaido Nippon-Ham Fighters (2013–2017) ===
==== 2013: Rookie season, NPB All-Star ====
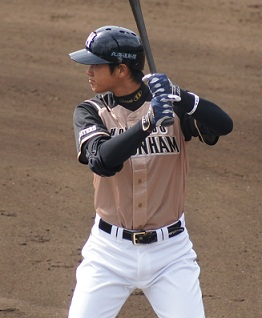
Ohtani batting in 2013 for the Fighters

Ohtani made his debut at age 18 in the Fighters' season-opening game on March 29, 2013, playing as a right fielder. He was selected for a Pacific League roster spot for the 2013 All-star game. As a pitcher, he finished the season with a 3–0 record in 11 starts. As a rookie Ohtani was used in both the outfield (leading the Fighters with 51 games in right) and as a pitcher. He was the second Nippon Pro Baseball (NPB) rookie drafted out of high school the previous year to be used as both a pitcher and position player, following Kikuo Tokunaga in 1951; Ohtani was the first to start in both roles. He was the first NPB pitcher since Takao Kajimoto in 1963 to bat 3rd, 4th, or 5th and the first rookie hurler to do so since Junzo Sekine in 1950. He was the second player, following Osamu Takechi (also 1950), to start a game as a pitcher, bat in the heart of the order (3rd through 5th), and get a hit and a run batted in (RBI) in that game. He missed time during the year with a right ankle sprain and right cheekbone fracture.

For the season, Ohtani was 3–0 with a 4.23 ERA, 33 walks, and 46 strikeouts in 61 2/3 innings. and hit .238/.284/.376 in 204 plate appearances. He had seven outfield assists and one error. His 8 hit batsmen tied Manabu Mima, Tadashi Settsu, Hideaki Wakui and Ryoma Nogami for fifth in the Pacific League. Ohtani received 4 of the 233 votes for the Nippon Professional Baseball Rookie of the Year Award (Pacific League), tying Tatsuya Sato for a distant second behind Takahiro Norimoto. During his five-year tenure with the Fighters, Ohtani opted to live in the team's provided dormitories, while his parents oversaw his finances.

==== 2014: Second NPB All-Star selection ====
Throughout the entire season, Ohtani performed double-duty as a pitcher and outfielder, utilizing his strong throwing arm as well as his impressive batting skills. As a hitter, he batted .274, with 28 extra-base hits (including 10 home runs), 31 RBIs, and a .842 on-base plus slugging percentage in 234 plate appearances. As a pitcher, he was 11–4 with a 2.61 ERA in 24 starts and struck out 179 (third in NPB) in 155 1/3 innings. His 10.4 strikeouts per nine innings (K/9) led the league and opponents hit just .223 against him.

Ohtani pitched 7.0 innings against the Fukuoka SoftBank Hawks on August 26, allowing one earned run and striking out nine batters to record his 10th win of the season in a 4–2 victory. The following month, during a game against the Orix Buffaloes at Kyocera Dome on September 7, he hit a home run to center field off pitcher Kazumasa Yoshida in the top of the fourth inning. This marked his 10th home run of the season. By reaching double digits in both home runs and pitching wins, Ohtani became the first player in NPB history to record at least 10 wins as a pitcher and at least 10 home runs as a batter in the same season. He was also the first player to accomplish this feat in a professional baseball league since Babe Ruth, who won 13 games and hit 11 home runs for the Boston Red Sox during the 1918 Major League Baseball season.

Ohtani pitched a 1–0 shutout against the Buffaloes on September 13, becoming the first pitcher out of high school to record a 1–0 shutout victory within his first two years for the Fighters since Toshiaki Moriyasu in 1967. He also became the first pitcher out of high school to record two shutout victories within his first two years in the NPB since Yu Darvish.

During the July 2014 All-Star Game, Ohtani threw a 101 mph (162 km/h) fastball in the bottom of the first inning, setting a new record for the fastest official pitch thrown by a Japanese pitcher, beating the record set by the Yakult Swallows' Yoshinori Sato in 2010 (100 mph (161 km/h)). The jersey he wore during the game sold for 1.75 million yen ($17,000), making it the top seller at the All-Star 2014 charity auction. The proceeds were donated to three Tohoku earthquake children's relief funds.

On October 5 against the Tohoku Rakuten Golden Eagles, Ohtani recorded the fastest pitch by a Japanese pitcher in an official game, tying Marc Kroon's record for NPB pitchers. The pitch came against lead-off hitter Ginji Akaminai in the first inning. With the count 0–1, Ohtani threw a fastball that registered 101 mph (162 km/h) on the stadium radar gun and shattered Akaminai's bat in half. He also hit 101 mph twice against the second hitter, Aoi Enomoto. Of the 15 pitches he threw in the first inning, eight were in the 160s; 99s in MPH.

During the postseason, Ohtani was chosen to become a member of the national team, dubbed Samurai Japan, and participated in the Suzuki All-Star Series, a five-game friendly competition with a squad of major leaguers. In Game 1, he pitched one shutout inning in relief, retiring three consecutive batters. He started Game 5 at the Sapporo Dome and, although his team ultimately lost (3–1), he wasn't charged with an earned run (he gave up two unearned), and of the 12 outs he recorded in four innings, he got seven via strikeout. He threw mostly fastballs, including one clocked at 99 mph (160 km/h), occasional curveballs, and a few forkballs in the mid-140s, including one he threw below the strike zone in the second inning to strike out Tampa Bay Rays star Ben Zobrist swinging.

In December, Ohtani became the second player out of high school in NPB history to reach 100M yen in salary in his third year, after Daisuke Matsuzaka in 2001. His new contract more than tripled his previous salary estimated at 30M yen.

==== 2015: PL Pitcher Best Nine, PL ERA leader ====
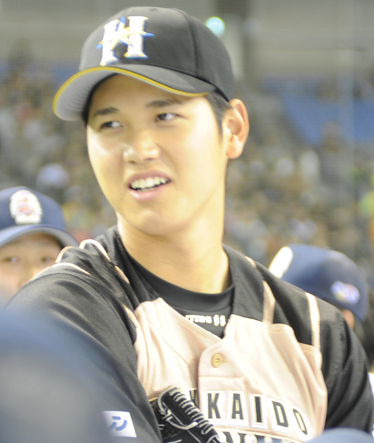
Ohtani with the Fighters in 2015

2015 marked Ohtani's third professional season (and second full season). Though his offensive production declined somewhat (five home runs), his performance on the mound was among the best in the league, earning him the starter role in the 2015 All-Star Game and the pitching spot in the end-of-year Pacific League Best Nine awards. Ohtani started the 2015 NPB All-Star Game 1 for the PL. He went two innings and struck out two, allowing one run (on a double by Yoshitomo Tsutsugo and a single by Jose Lopez), relieved by Nishi with a 1–0 deficit. The PL would lose 8–6 but he got a no-decision.

He finished the season tied for most wins (with Wakui) and leading the league in winning percentage with a 15–5 record in just 22 starts. His 2.24 ERA, five complete games and three shutouts were also the best in the league. All these stats were career bests, as were his 196 strikeouts, 0.909 WHIP and 11 strikeouts per nine innings. batters facing him were held to 100 hits in 160 2/3 innings. He was second in strikeouts (19 behind Norimoto, though he threw 34 fewer innings).

He rarely played the field but did see some action at DH, hitting .202/.252/.376 with five home runs in 109 at-bats. He finished third in MVP voting again, placing behind Yanagita and Shogo Akiyama for the 2015 Pacific League MVP. Ohtani placed third in MVP voting (first among pitchers) and was one of three candidates considered for the 2015 Sawamura Award, given annually to the top pitcher in either league.

Ohtani was dominant for the Japanese national team in the 2015 Premier 12. He hit 100 mph while blowing away eventual champion South Korea (10 K, 2 H, 2 BB, 0 R in 6 IP) before Norimoto was relieved. Facing South Korea again in the semifinals, he was even sharper (11 K, 0 BB, 1 HB, 1 H in 7 IP). He did not give up a hit until Keun-woo Jeong singled in the seventh inning and had the most whiffs in a game for the first Premier 12 ever. Norimoto relieved with a 3–0 lead but he and two other relievers combined to allow four in the 9th to blow it as Japan fell in a shocking defeat. He tied for the event lead in ERA and led in strikeouts while allowing the lowest average by a starting pitcher. He was named the All-Star SP for the event (Sho Nakata was the only other member of Samurai Japan to be picked for the All-Star team).

==== 2016: Japan Series champion, PL MVP ====
In 104 games and 382 plate appearances in 2016, Ohtani hit 22 home runs. He also hit 18 doubles, 67 RBI, batted .322 with an OBP of .416, scored 65 runs, and had seven stolen bases. He won the Best Nine award as the designated hitter (DH). Ohtani was the same dominant pitcher on the mound. In 21 games pitched, he had a career-low ERA of 1.86. He had a 10–4 record, struck out 174 batters in 140 innings with 4 complete games and one shutout. He also won the Best Nine award as a pitcher and won the Pacific League MVP. He got nearly double as many votes as any other pitcher for the PL for the 2016 NPB All-Star Game; he had 300,025 while second place Shota Takeda had 158,008. He could not pitch in the event due to a blister on his finger but wound up starring as a DH. In Game 1, he batted for DH Yuya Hasegawa and lined out in the 8th against Scott Mathieson. Starting at DH and hitting 5th in Game 2, he homered off Shoichi Ino in the 5th to start the PL comeback from a 3–0 deficit. He singled against Ryo Akiyoshi in the 7th and scored on a hit by Kenta Imamiya for a 4–3 lead. Coming up with a 5–4 deficit in the 8th, he singled off Shinji Tajima to bring in Shogo Akiyama with the tying run. He thus produced three of the PL's five runs in the 5–5 tie, earning him game MVP honors. He hit 102.5 mph (165 km/h) on the radar gun during the year, setting a new NPB record. The record was broken by Thyago Vieira five years later, but he still holds the record for a Japanese player.

He finished the year at .322/.416/.588 with 22 home runs in 382 plate appearances on offense and a 10–4 record and a 1.86 ERA on the mound with 174 strikeouts in 140 innings. He tied for 8th in the PL in wins and was third in strikeouts (behind Norimoto and Kodai Senga).

He led Nippon Ham to the 2016 Japan Series, but lost the opener to the Hiroshima Carp; he struck out 11 in 6 innings but allowed 3 runs, two on a homer by Brad Eldred and one on a steal of home by Seiya Suzuki. Down 2 games to 0, he came up big as the DH in Game 3, getting three hits, a run, and an RBI. In the bottom of the 10th, he singled off Daichi Osera score Nishikawa with the winner; Nippon Ham would take the next three games to win their second Japan Series title. Teammate Brandon Laird would win the Series MVP. Ohtani hit .375/.412/.625 with four doubles, doing more on offense than on the mound for the Series.

He made the Best Nine as the top pitcher and top DH in the PL. He became the first player to receive the awards as both a pitcher and a hitter. He topped four-time Cuban MVP Alfredo Despaigne easily at DH (190 votes to 47; three others combined for eight votes) but the vote at pitcher was closer (he had 111 of 245 votes, Ishikawa 69 and Tsuyoshi Wada 61). He was the runaway winner of the 2016 Pacific League Most Valuable Player Award, getting 253 of 254 first-place votes (Naoki Miyanishi got the other one) and one second-place vote. He had 1,268 vote points, to 298 for runner-up Laird.

==== 2017: Final season in the NPB ====
In 2017, he played in 65 games, hitting .332 with eight homers and 31 RBIs while posting a 3–2 record, a 3.20 ERA, and 29 strikeouts as a pitcher. In September, it was revealed that Ohtani would ask to be posted at the end of the season to play in Major League Baseball in 2018. However, before that could happen, he had surgery on his right ankle in early October. The injury had originally occurred in the 2016 Japan Series and had cost him a chance to play in the 2017 World Baseball Classic in addition to restricting his playing time during the season. On November 21, 2017, MLB and NPB came to a posting agreement for Ohtani.

Because he was under 25 years old, Ohtani was subjected to international signing rules. This capped his bonus at $3.557 million and limited him to a rookie salary scale, while the signing team also had to pay a $20 million posting fee to the Fighters. Ohtani narrowed his finalists to seven teams, signing with the Angels for a $2.315 million bonus.

=== Los Angeles Angels (2018–2023) ===
Ohtani discussed at Fox Sports, April 2018.

On December 9, 2017, Ohtani signed his deal with the Los Angeles Angels. On December 13, it was revealed that he had been diagnosed with a first-degree UCL sprain in his right elbow and received a platelet-rich plasma injection to treat the injury.

==== Initial reception by American media ====
Ohtani's debut MLB spring training in 2018 was disastrous and the majority of American news sources were extremely disappointed, concluding that he could not accomplish even one of his two-way abilities. Over two spring games against major leaguer batters, in just 2.2 innings pitching he gave up three home runs and had a 27.00 earned run average (average ERA for MLB pitchers was 4.14 that year). He completed his five spring training games, three against minor leaguers, with an 11.70 ERA in pitching, and with 4 hits in 32 at bats, for a slashline of .125/.222/.125 (avg/obp/slg, average of .248/.318/.409 for MLB batters that year). Several major newspapers suggested he needed plenty of Triple-A minor league appearances before starting for the Angels. By the end of Ohtani's impressive 2018 MLB regular season, the American media admitted they wrote off Ohtani far too early.

==== 2018: AL Rookie of the Year ====
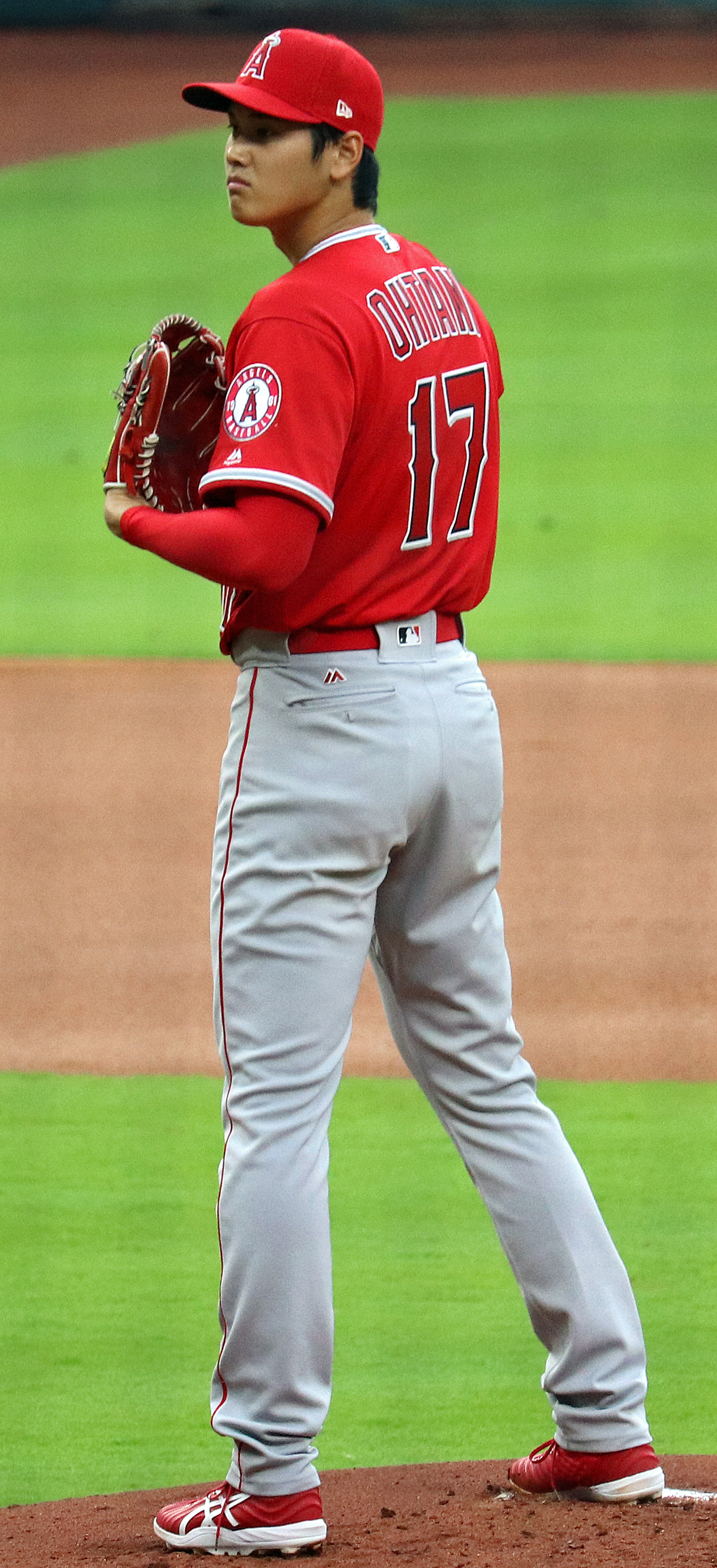
Ohtani on the mound in 2018

Before the start of the season, the Angels announced that they would use him as both a hitter and a pitcher. Ohtani started as the designated hitter on Opening Day, March 29, against the Oakland Athletics, singling in his first at-bat off of Kendall Graveman. On April 1, he made his pitching debut, striking out six batters in six innings while allowing three runs, to pick up his first MLB win. On April 3, Ohtani hit his first MLB home run, a 397-foot three-run homer against Josh Tomlin. On April 6, he hit his third home run in three days, becoming the first Angels rookie to do so. In only his second start on the mound on April 8, Ohtani took a perfect game through 6⅓ innings before allowing a hit. Overall, Ohtani pitched seven scoreless innings while striking out 12. On June 8, he was placed on the injured list for the first time in his MLB career due to a Grade 2 UCL sprain in his right elbow. He received platelet-rich plasma and stem-cell injections to treat the injury.

Ohtani was activated from the injured list as a hitter on July 2 and on August 3, hit two home runs against the Cleveland Indians, marking his first career multiple-home run game and his first two home runs in a road game. After not pitching for 11 weeks, Angels manager Mike Scioscia announced that Ohtani would start the game against the Houston Astros on September 2. However, hampered by a tight back and sore finger he only lasted 2 1/3 innings in the game.

Ohtani ended his first major league season with a batting average of .285, a .361 on-base-percentage, 22 home runs, 61 RBIs, and 10 stolen bases. In 10 starts on the mound, he notched a 4–2 record with a 3.31 ERA, 1.16 walks plus hits per inning pitched (WHIP), and 63 strikeouts. His .564 slugging percentage ranked seventh overall among MLB players with at least 350 plate appearances for this season. He became the second-fastest Angels rookie to reach 20 home runs, and he joined Babe Ruth as the only MLB players with 10 pitching appearances and 20 homers in a season. He also won the American League Rookie of the Month award twice; in April and in September.

On September 3, it was revealed that Ohtani would undergo Tommy John surgery, after an MRI showed new damage to his UCL. He underwent the surgery on October 1. On November 12, he was named the American League Rookie of the Year.

==== 2019: Injury-shortened season ====
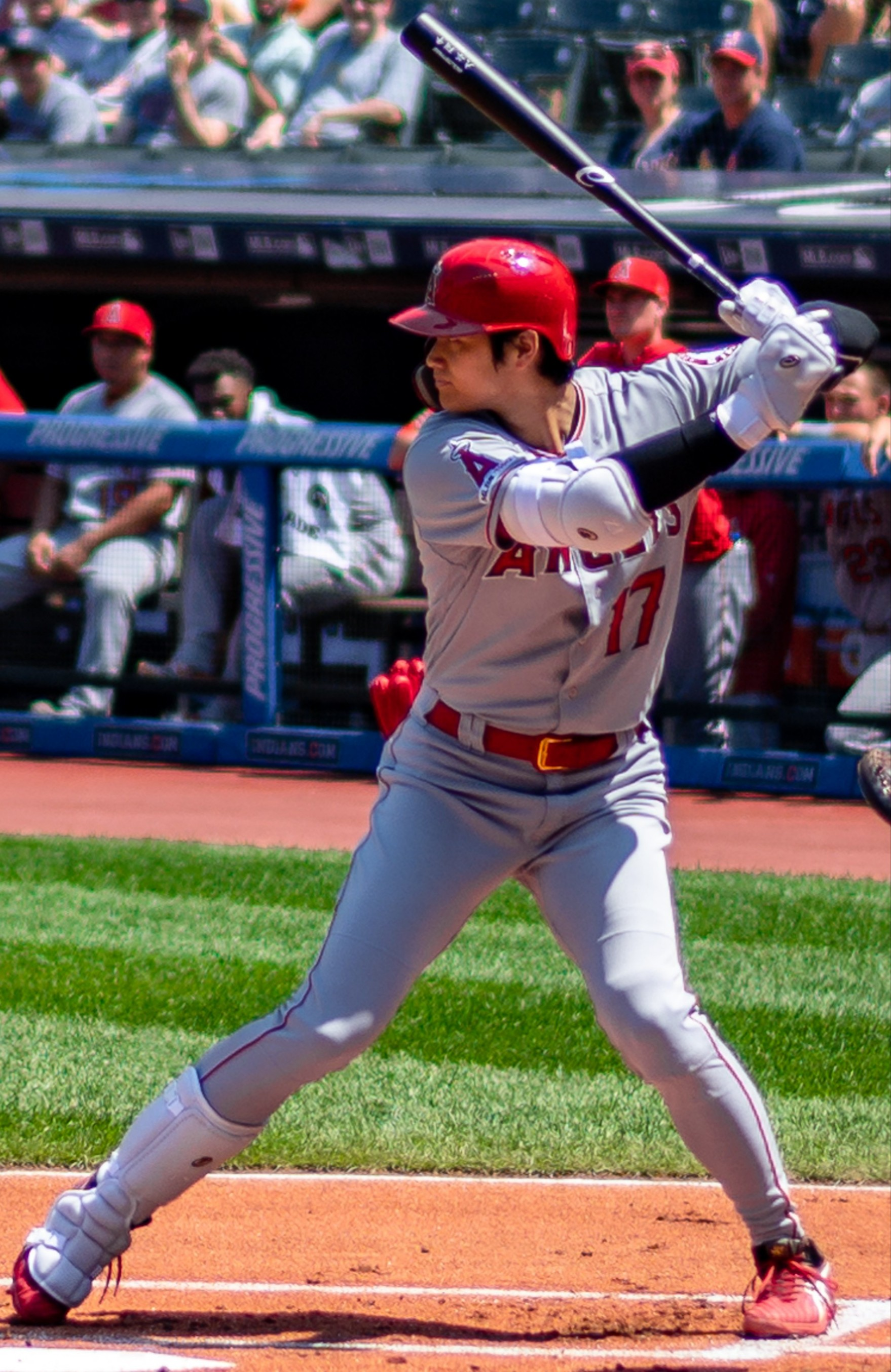
Ohtani batting in 2019

On May 7, 2019, Ohtani played in his first game with the Angels since undergoing Tommy John surgery, batting as a designated hitter against the Detroit Tigers. In a June 13 game against the Tampa Bay Rays, he became the first Japanese-born player to hit for the cycle in MLB history. On September 12, his season prematurely ended after it was revealed that he needed surgery to repair a bipartite patella. He finished the season batting .286/.343/.505 with 18 home runs, 62 RBIs, and 12 stolen bases in 106 games.

==== 2020: Continued injury struggles ====
The 2020 MLB season did not start until July 24 due to the COVID-19 pandemic. On July 24, Ohtani was the first ever automatic player on second base in an official MLB game at the start of the 10th inning as part of one of the new 2020 MLB season rules in a game against the Oakland Athletics. He was thrown out in a rundown. On July 26, Ohtani returned to the mound against the Oakland Athletics, making his first pitching appearance since September 2018. He allowed five runs and was removed from the mound without recording an out, starting his season with a loss and an infinite ERA. After his second start he began to experience discomfort in his right arm, and it was eventually revealed that he had a flexor strain in his right elbow after undergoing an MRI. He was shut down from pitching for the rest of the season.

On the offensive side, Ohtani finished the season batting .190/.291/.366 with seven home runs, 24 RBIs, and seven stolen bases in 43 games. The culmination of experiencing injuries in his 2019 and 2020 campaigns led to Ohtani describing feeling "frustrated" and "useless". He went on to say that while his 2019 had been disappointing, his 2020 had been "more like pathetic" because he could not pitch or hit the way he wanted to. Ohtani said, "[Until 2019], I could more or less do the things I wanted to do. I'd pretty much never experienced the feeling of wanting to do something but being completely unable to do it."

==== 2021: Unanimous AL MVP ====
After the results of the 2019 and 2020 seasons, Ohtani spent the offseason overhauling himself. He adjusted his diet, threw bullpen sessions earlier than usual and took batting practice against live pitching, an offseason first for him. He also embraced data and technology to optimize his training and recovery and also tinkered with a changeup. Furthermore, in spring training, the Angels and Ohtani agreed to allow him to play without limitations or restrictions and drop the "Ohtani Rules", a plan the Angels mirrored from Ohtani's schedule in Japan and had implemented since his 2018 rookie season that restricted his usage to a schedule of pitching once a week and hitting only three to four times between starts.

On February 8, Ohtani agreed to a two-year $8.5 million contract with the Angels, avoiding arbitration. On June 23, he hit for himself as a pitcher and the second batter in the lineup with designated hitter rules in place, making it the first time in MLB history that an American League team chose not to use a DH while a National League team used one. On July 7, he hit his 32nd home run of the year, a solo shot off of Boston Red Sox starter Eduardo Rodríguez, passing Hideki Matsui's mark in 2004, for the most home runs hit during a season by a Japanese-born player in MLB. Ohtani became the first player to be selected as an All-Star as both a position player and a pitcher. Ohtani participated in the 2021 Home Run Derby on July 12. He lost to Juan Soto in the first round, but set a record for the most home runs in the Derby of at least 500 feet with six. In the All-Star Game, he was the starting pitcher and leadoff designated hitter for the American League.

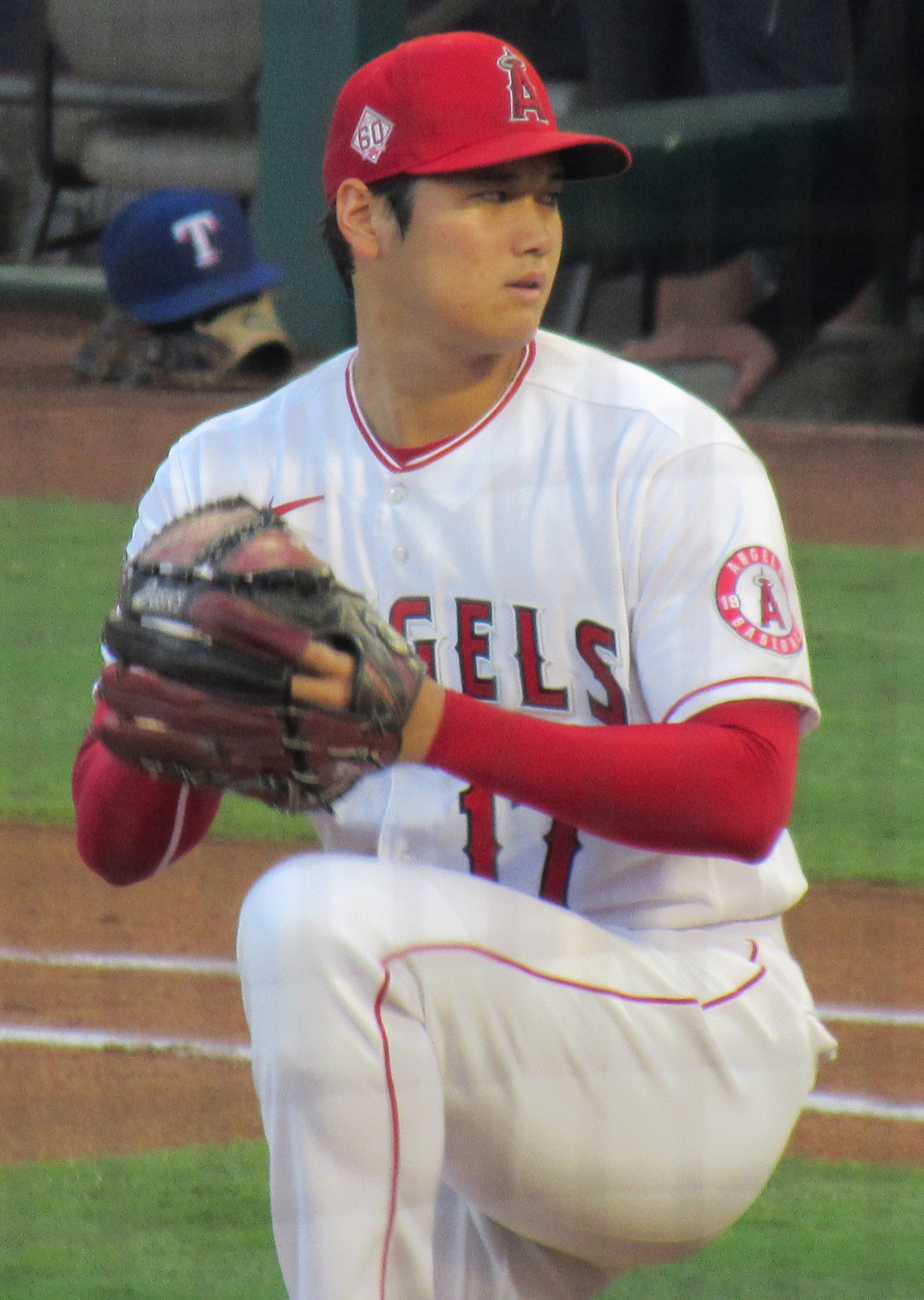
Ohtani with the Angels in 2021

On July 26, in his 15th pitching start of the season against the Colorado Rockies, Ohtani became the first pitcher in league history to register 100 strikeouts while holding a major-league-leading 35 home runs before the end of July, as no pitcher had ever recorded triple-digit strikeouts and added more than nine home runs in the same season. Additionally, in the same game, Ohtani became the first pitcher to throw a scoreless top half and record a hit, a RBI, a stolen base and a scored run while playing in an AL ballpark since Luis Tiant did so for the Minnesota Twins on April 26, 1970.

Ohtani would finish the month of July as the first player in Major League history to ever have at least 37 home runs and 15 stolen bases before the end of July. And for the second straight month, Ohtani also earned his second American League Player of the Month Award, becoming the first back-to-back Player of the Month Award winner in either league since Chase Headley in August and September 2012, and the first in the AL since Josh Hamilton in 2012. For July, he produced nine home runs, 19 RBIs, 16 walks, and a .282/.396/.671 slash line in 23 games at the plate, and a 1.35 ERA with 17 strikeouts and one walk in 20 innings.

On August 18, Ohtani hit his 40th of the year, becoming the first left-handed batter in Angels history to reach 40 home runs, surpassing lefty Reggie Jackson's 1982 record of 39. He capped off the month of August by stealing his 20th base in a game on August 28 against the San Diego Padres, becoming the first Japanese-born player and the first player in Angels history to hit 40 home runs and have 20 stolen bases in the same season. He joined Alex Rodriguez in 2007 and Ken Griffey Jr. in 1999 as the 3rd AL player to accomplish this feat before September. He also became the first AL player to reach both of those totals in a season since Curtis Granderson in 2011.

From September 22 to 25, Ohtani drew 13 walks in a 4-game span, tying an AL/NL record set by Babe Ruth in 1930, Bryce Harper in 2016, and Yasmani Grandal in 2021. He drew a career-high four walks on September 22 and three walks on September 23, against the Houston Astros, followed by four more walks on September 24 and two walks on September 25 against the Seattle Mariners. His 11 walks drawn in the three-game span also tied the MLB record set by Harper in 2016.

On September 26, Ohtani reached the 150-strikeout milestone against the Seattle Mariners and finished the year unbeaten at home, going 6–0 with a 1.95 ERA in 13 starts. Ohtani's home ERA was the lowest by an Angels starter since Jered Weaver in 2011. He also became the sixth starter in AL or NL history to make at least 13 home starts without a losing decision and an ERA below 2.00 in a season. In the last game of the season against the Seattle Mariners, he passed teammate Mike Trout's 45 home runs in a single season to finish with the second-most home runs in a season in Angels history at 46, trailing only Troy Glaus' 47 home runs in 2000.

For the year, Ohtani finished his pitching campaign by making 23 starts on the mound, going 9–2 with a 3.18 ERA, 156 strikeouts, 1.09 WHIP, and 44 walks in 130 1/3 innings. On the hitting side, Ohtani finished with an American League-leading 20 intentional walks, which was the most by an AL player since Trout in 2018. Ohtani, who batted .257/.372/.592, including 46 home runs — runner-up for the MLB lead in homers, 100 RBI, 103 runs, and 26 steals in 155 games and 639 plate appearances, hit several milestones to close his season, reaching both 100 RBIs and 100 runs for the first time in his career. He also tied for the MLB lead with eight triples to go along with 26 stolen bases. Ohtani became the first player in MLB history to have at least 45 homers, 25 stolen bases, 100 RBIs, 100 runs, and eight triples in a season and the second player in AL history to record at least 45 homers and 25 stolen bases in a season, joining Jose Canseco in 1998. He led the league with a wins above replacement (WAR) value of 9.1 and finished third in home runs (46), fourth in slugging percentage (.592), fifth in OPS (.965), first in triples (eight), fifth in drawing walks (96), eighth in stolen bases (26), second in extra-base hits (80), second in intentional walks (20), fifth in OPS+ (158), and first in power-speed number (33.2).

Ohtani was unanimously voted the American League Most Valuable Player, becoming the 23rd pitcher and first designated hitter to win the award. For the 2021 All-MLB Team, Ohtani became the first player to be named to both First and Second teams, in the same season (as a designated hitter and starting pitcher, respectively). He became the first pitcher, the first Japanese player and the first Angels player to win the Edgar Martínez Outstanding Designated Hitter Award. Ohtani was also awarded the Silver Slugger Award for being the best offensive player at the designated hitter position in the American League, and was named to Time 100's list of most influential people of 2021, which culminated to many end-of-the-season-accolades. He was named Associated Press Athlete of the Year, Sporting News Athlete of the Year, Baseball Digest Player of the Year and Baseball America Major League Player of the Year. From his MLB peers he was given Sporting News Player of the Year Award, Players Choice Player of the Year Award, and Players Choice American League Outstanding Player Award. He was also named as both the team's Los Angeles Angels Player of the Year of 2021 and the team's Nick Adenhart Pitcher of the Year Award, as voted by his teammates.

Additionally, Ohtani's 2021 season was recognized for two Guinness World Records titles: (1) the first MLB player to achieve 100+ innings and record 100+ strikeouts as a pitcher, and 100+ RBIs, hits and runs as a batter in a single season and (2) the first player to start the MLB All-Star Game as a pitcher and a designated hitter. He also became the 16th recipient of the Commissioner's Historic Achievement Award, awarded by Commissioner Rob Manfred, who formally recognized Ohtani's 2021 season as "historically significant" and "unprecedented", calling it "so special that it was important to recognize the historic achievement that took place in 2021 with an award just about 2021." Ohtani was offered Japan's national honor, the People's Honor Award, by the Prime Minister of Japan in recognition of his accomplishments, but Ohtani rejected it, saying it was "still too early" for such an award. On December 22, The Sporting News released the article "The 50 greatest seasons in sports history, ranked". In it, Ohtani's 2021 season was ranked No. 1, topping great seasons by athletes such as Babe Ruth, Michael Jordan, Tom Brady, Wayne Gretzky, and Lionel Messi.

==== 2022: AL MVP finalist, two-way dominance ====
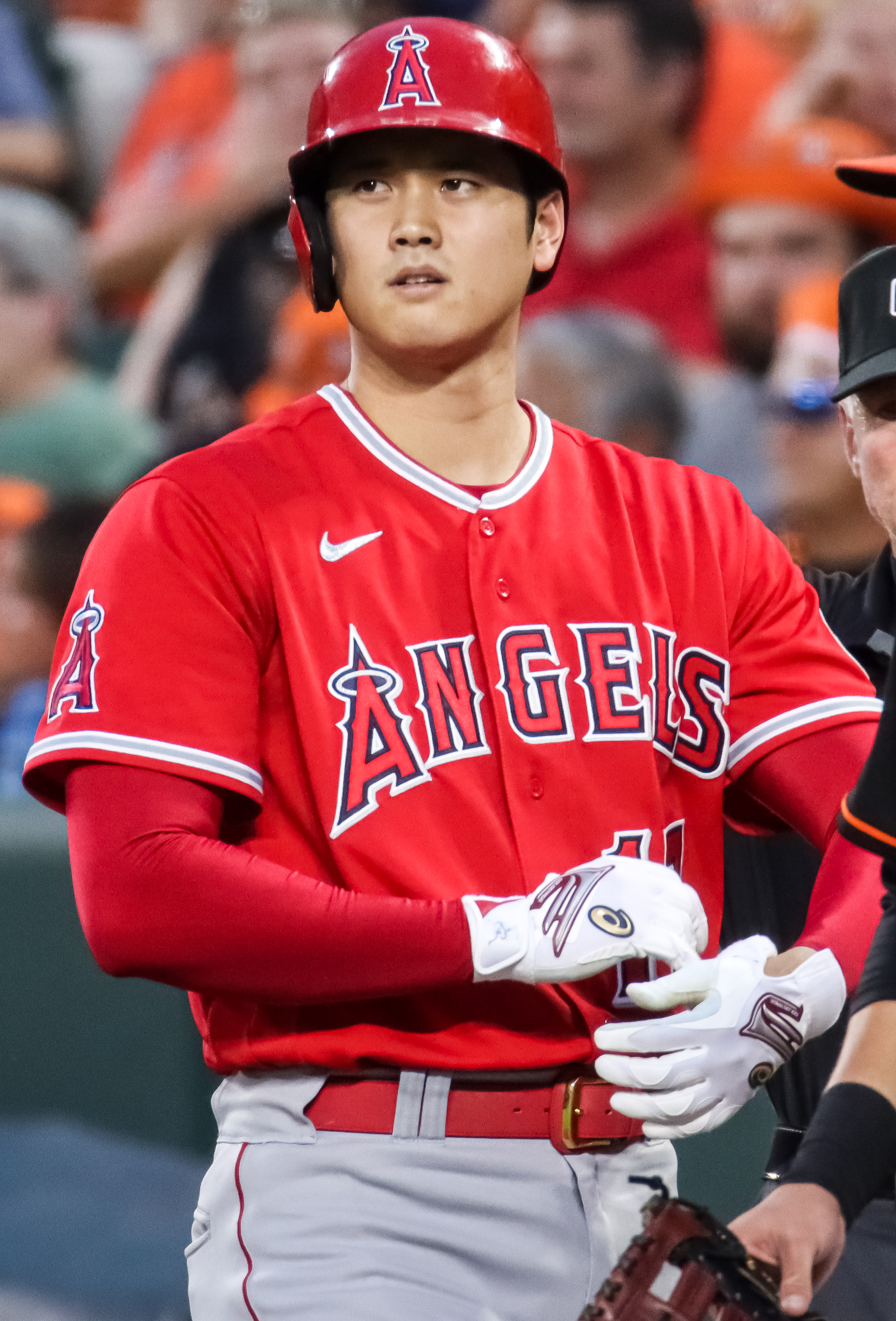
Ohtani in July 2022

On March 22, 2022, Major League Baseball introduced a new rule that allows for a pitcher in the batting order to remain in the game as a designated hitter after they are pulled from the pitching mound, colloquially dubbed the "Ohtani rule". The Angels named him as the Opening Day starting pitcher and he pitched 4 2/3 innings against the Houston Astros, allowing one earned run and one walk while striking out nine. He became the first player in MLB history to start Opening Day as both the starting pitcher and the leadoff hitter.

Ohtani recorded two home runs, including a grand slam, on May 9, against the Tampa Bay Rays, marking the second time of the season and the eighth time in his career for Ohtani to record a multi-homer game, surpassing Ichiro Suzuki for the most by a Japanese-born player in MLB history, The grand slam was the first of his professional career, including both NPB and MLB. On May 14, he hit his 100th career MLB home run, making him the third Japanese-born player with at least 100 homers in the majors, trailing only Hideki Matsui with 175 and Suzuki with 117. Ohtani also joined Babe Ruth as the only players with at least 100 home runs and at least 250 strikeouts as a pitcher.

On June 9, Ohtani hit a go-ahead two-run home run and pitched seven innings, including throwing a 101 mph fastball to strike out Rafael Devers to end the third – the hardest strikeout pitch of his career, in a win over the Boston Red Sox to end the Angels' 14-game losing streak, the longest in franchise history. The victory resulted in a six-game pitching span from June 9 to July 13, where Ohtani went 6–0 with a 0.45 ERA (39.2 IP & 2 ER) and 58 strikeouts, (while also hitting eight HR with a .997 OPS), while becoming the fourth pitcher all-time to go 6–0 with 58+ SO and 2-or-fewer ER in a six-game span, joining Cy Young winners Johan Santana (2004), R.A. Dickey (2012) and Clayton Kershaw (2014).

In a two-game span from June 21–22, 2022, Ohtani made MLB history by becoming the first player in the American League or National League to have at least eight RBIs in a game and strike out at least 10 batters the next day. On June 21, Ohtani hit a pair of three-run homers and set a career-high with eight RBIs, becoming the first player born in Japan to have eight RBIs in a game and just the eighth player in Angels history to have eight RBIs in a game. Ohtani's eight RBIs were the most by an Angels player since Garret Anderson had a franchise-record 10 RBIs against the New York Yankees on August 21, 2007. It was also the most RBIs in a game by a Japanese-born player, surpassing seven-RBI games from Matsui in 2009 and Tadahito Iguchi in 2006.

On July 6, 2022, against the Miami Marlins, Ohtani made MLB history again by becoming the first player since RBI became an official statistic in 1920 to record 10 strikeouts as a pitcher, two RBIs as a batter, and a stolen base all in a single game. His 111 strikeouts over 81 innings pitched in the game made him the first Angels pitcher to record 110 K's in the first half in fewer than 100 innings and the first Angels pitcher to 110 K's in the first half since Garrett Richards in 2014. He also became the fourth Angels player with multiple seasons of 15 home runs and 10 stolen bases before the All-Star break and the eighth Major Leaguer since earned runs were official in 1913 to record 40-plus strikeouts and zero earned runs in a four-start span.

For a second straight year, Ohtani was voted into All-Star Game by fans as the starter at the designated hitter position and he was selected as a starting pitcher again. Ohtani announced; however, that he would only participate as a hitter in the All-Star Game, even though he was considered as a candidate to start for the AL team. He declined to pitch, citing a scheduling conflict and his preference to "prioritize the season over the All-Star Game."

In a game against the Oakland Athletics where he pitched and hit, Ohtani completed three historical feats on August 9, 2022. Ohtani joined Babe Ruth in an exclusive 10-homer, 10-win club; moved up on the all-time home run list for Japanese-born players; and set a single-season career high in strikeouts. Ohtani tossed six scoreless innings to earn his 10th win of the season for the first time in his Major League career. He and Ruth are the only two players in AL and NL history to win at least 10 games on the mound and hit at least 10 home runs in the same season. Ed Rile and Bullet Rogan also accomplished this feat in the Negro leagues as well. Ohtani's 25th home run of the season was his 118th career home run, which surpassed Ichiro Suzuki's 117 career home runs to become second place on the all-time Major League home run list for Japanese-born players. Ohtani's five strikeouts in the game brought him to 157 on the season, a new single-season high eclipsing his 2021 total of 156. Combined with his playing days in Nippon Professional Baseball, Ohtani reached 1,000 strikeouts between NPB (624) and MLB (379).

The Angels avoided arbitration with Ohtani on October 1, signing him to a one-year deal worth $30 million for the 2023 season. At $30 million, the deal set a new record for a player in his third year of arbitration, surpassing the $27 million Mookie Betts received before the 2020 season, and also gave Ohtani the biggest salary raise of any arbitration-eligible player (Juan Soto later broke it with $30.1 million); a $24.5 million raise from his 2022 salary of $5.5 million and $3 million of 2021.

Ohtani finished his 2022 season with a 15–9 record, a 2.33 ERA, and 219 strikeouts in 166 innings. He also hit .273/.356/.519 with 34 homers, 30 doubles, 11 stolen bases, and 95 RBIs in 157 games. Among AL pitchers, Ohtani finished the year first in strikeouts per nine innings pitched (11.87), third in strikeouts (219), fourth in ERA (2.33) and tied for fourth in wins (15), while amongst AL hitters, Ohtani ranked fourth in homers (34), fifth in OPS (.875), fifth in total bases (304), third in intentional walks (14), tied for third in extra-base hits (70), fifth in slugging (.519), tied for fourth in triples (6), seventh in RBIs (95), seventh in walks (72), and tied for eighth in runs (90). Ohtani also led the majors with a home-to-first average time of 4.09 seconds and was the only player in the majors to tally at least six triples and 34 home runs in 2022 (making him the first player to do so in a second consecutive year). He hit a ball with the highest exit velocity in major league baseball for the season, at 119.1 mph. He was once again named as both the team's Los Angeles Angels Player and Pitcher of the Year, won a second straight Edgar Martínez Outstanding Designated Hitter Award, and was runner-up for the American League Most Valuable Player Award.

==== 2023: Second unanimous AL MVP ====
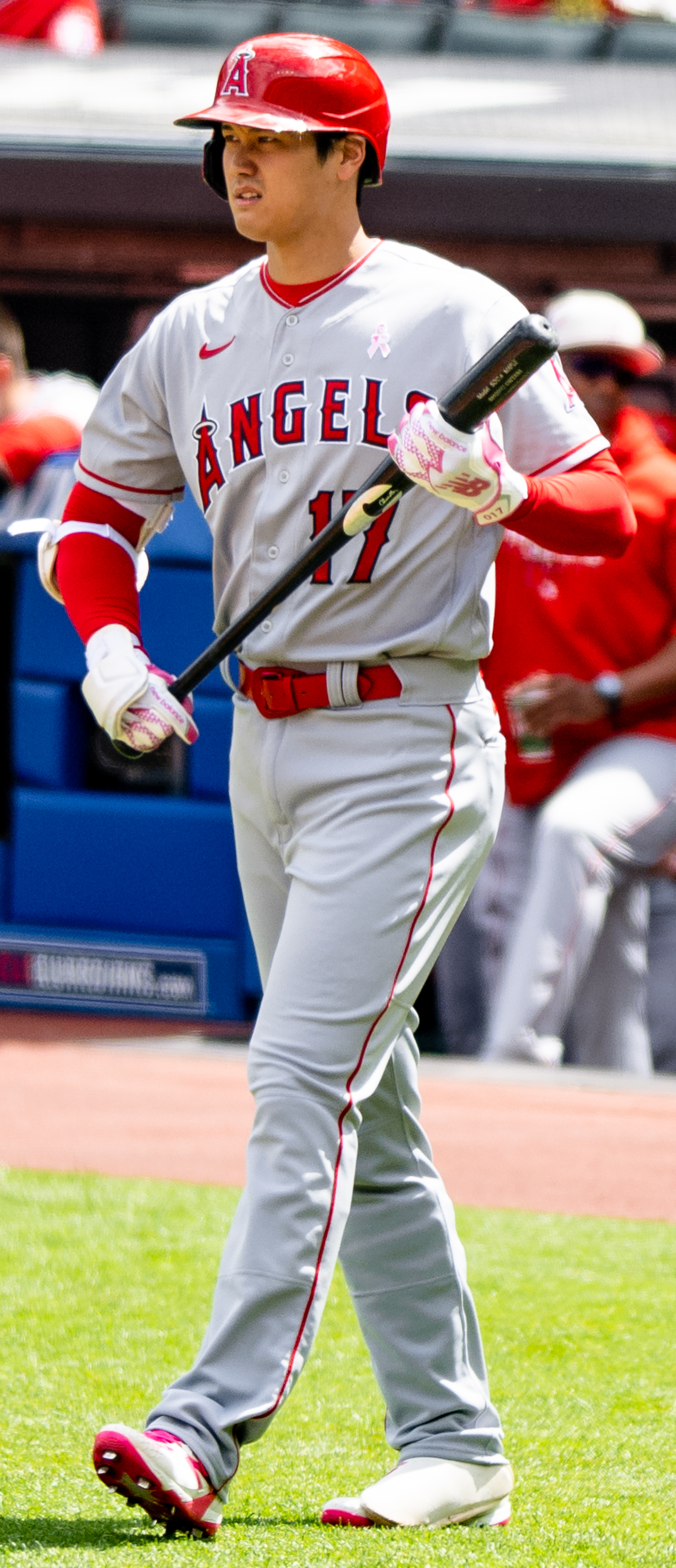
Ohtani with the Angels in 2023

Fresh off being named the Most Valuable Player of the 2023 World Baseball Classic championship, Ohtani made his second straight Opening Day start for the Angels' while batting third in the lineup against the Athletics on March 30. On May 10, he struck out Jeremy Peña of the Astros for his 502nd career pitching strikeout, passing Babe Ruth on the all-time strikeout list. With the feat, he also set the record for most pitching strikeouts by a player with 100 home runs.

Ohtani was named AL Player of the Week for the fifth time in his career after hitting six home runs, going .435 (10-for-23), 12 RBIs, 10 walks and a 1.893 OPS over seven games from June 12 to 18, 2023, at the plate and picking up a win as starting pitcher on June 15, 2023, against the Texas Rangers. At the time, he was leading MLB in homers (24), RBIs (58), and total bases (175) while slashing .300/.384/.632 . The honor would also tie him with Suzuki for the most by a Japanese-born player.

Ohtani would finish the month of June by winning his sixth career AL Player of the Week award, surpassing Suzuki for the most by a Japanese-born player, after hitting six home runs with a 1.783 OPS over a seven-day span from June 26 to July 2, 2023, including a career-long 493-foot home run, the longest homer in the 2023 MLB season; as well as winning his third career American League Player of the Month for June. His performance in June was considered to be the best June in MLB history, as over 126 plate appearances, he batted .394 and led the major leagues in on-base percentage (.492), slugging percentage (.952), OPS (1.444), home runs (15), RBIs (29), extra-base hits (25) and total bases (99). He also threw 30⅓ sterling innings, with a 3.26 ERA, 37 strikeouts, and an opponent slash line of .228/.302/.368 as a starting pitcher.

Ohtani earned an automatic spot on the 2023 All-Star roster after being the leading vote-getter in the American League All-Star ballot during Phase 1 of fan voting, received 2,646,307 votes as the starter in the DH position. He was also elected as an All-Star pitcher for the American League, making it the third straight year Ohtani was named an All-Star as both a pitcher and a DH. He would enter the All-Star Game with 30+ homers for the second time in his career, having hit 33 previously in 2021. Like 2022, Ohtani opted to participate only as a hitter in the All-Star Game and not pitch due to a blister.

On July 27, Ohtani pitched a complete-game shutout during game one of a doubleheader against the Detroit Tigers, recording his first complete game (and shutout) of his MLB career. He struck out eight batters and walked three, allowing just one single. He later went on to hit two home runs during game two. For July, Ohtani earned his seventh career AL Player of the Week award and fourth career American League Player of the Month.

Ohtani recorded his second career grand slam and his 43rd home run in a loss against the Rays on August 19. On August 23, he hit his 44th home run of the 2023 season but was removed from his start against the Cincinnati Reds after 1⅓ inning after experiencing what was initially reported as arm fatigue. It was later revealed that Ohtani would not pitch for the rest of the 2023 season and the 2024 season after suffering a ulnar collateral ligament tear in his right elbow. He finished his 2023 season on the mound with a 10–5 record, posting a 3.14 ERA and striking out 167 batters. On September 16, he was ruled out for the remainder of the season after suffering an oblique strain. He received elbow surgery performed by Dr. Neal ElAttrache on September 19, 2023, to address the UCL tear in his right elbow.

In 135 games as a hitter, he batted .304/.412/.654 with 44 home runs, 95 RBI, and 20 stolen bases. Ohtani ended the 2023 regular season as the first Japanese-born player to lead a U.S. major league in home runs, capturing the American League title with 44 home runs. Ohtani led the league with a wins above replacement (WAR) value of 10.1, slugging percentage (.654), OPS (1.066), adjusted OPS+ (184), offensive win percentage (.810), and finished second in on-base percentage (.416), fourth in home runs (44), ninth in batting average (.304), fifth in triples (eight), second in intentional walks (21), second in adjusted batting wins (5.8), second in adjusted batting runs (60), fifth in extra-base hits (78), fifth in runs created (138), and tenth in walks (91).

For the second time in his career, Ohtani was unanimously voted the American League Most Valuable Player, becoming the first player in MLB history to win MVP by unanimous vote twice. He was also named to the 2023 All-MLB Team, becoming the first player to ever be named to both first teams in the same season (as a designated hitter and starting pitcher respectively). He won his third straight Edgar Martínez Outstanding Designated Hitter Award, his second Silver Slugger Award for being the best offensive player at the designated hitter position in the American League, and his first career AL Hank Aaron Award. For the third straight year, the Angels announced that Ohtani was once again the team's Los Angeles Angels Player of the Year of 2023, as voted by his teammates. Ohtani won his second Associated Press Athlete of the Year, joining a group of 11 male athletes to have received the honor multiple times, and his second Baseball America Major League Player of the Year honor. From his MLB peers, he was awarded his second Players Choice American League Outstanding Player Award. Ohtani's contract expired after the 2023 season and he became a free agent for the first time in his career.

=== Los Angeles Dodgers (2024–present) ===
On December 11, 2023, Ohtani signed a 10-year, $700 million contract with the Los Angeles Dodgers, the largest contract in professional sports history at the time. His wages were structured so that $68 million per season was deferred until after the deal's conclusion, to be paid out from 2034 to 2043. This meant that Ohtani would only receive $2 million per season from 2024 to 2033.

==== 2024: World Series champion, 50–50 club, unanimous NL MVP ====
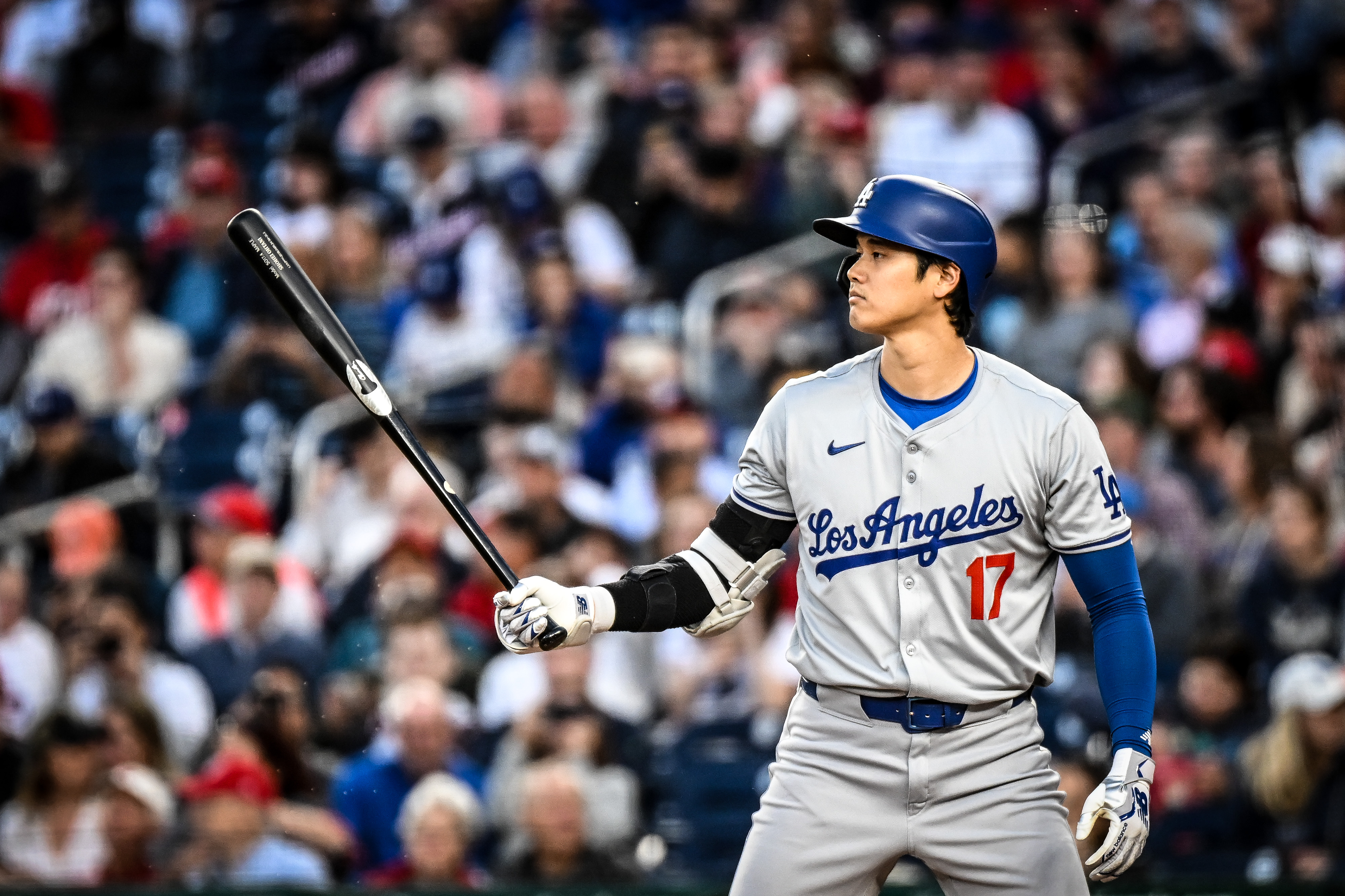
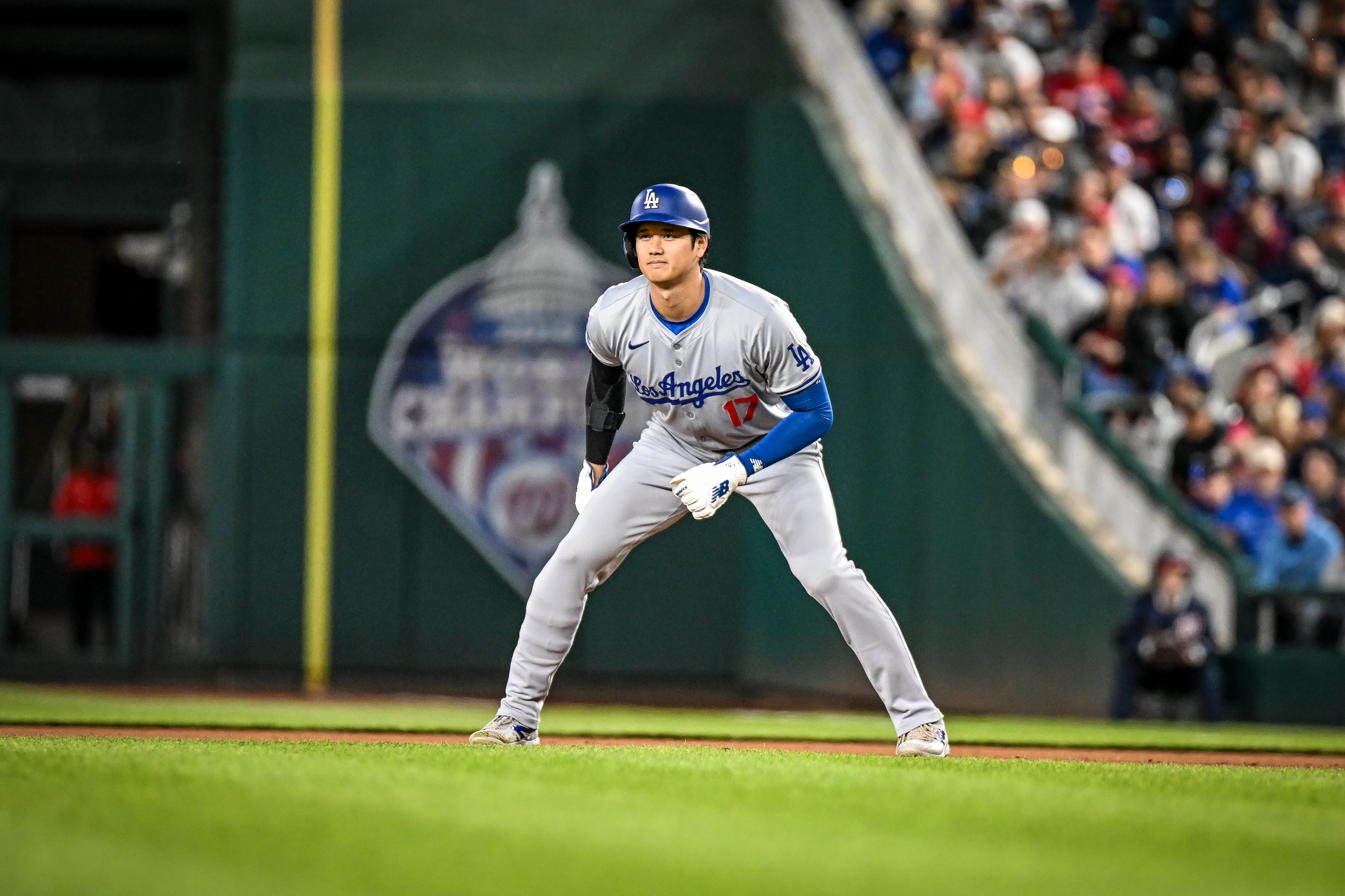
Ohtani on his way to 50 home runs and 50 stolen bases in April 2024.

Because of his elbow injury and consequent surgery in September 2023, Ohtani and the Dodgers announced that he would not pitch in the 2024 season. Ohtani debuted with the Dodgers as the designated hitter on March 20, against the San Diego Padres in Seoul, as part of the MLB Seoul Series. He hit his first home run as a Dodger against the San Francisco Giants on April 3, six years to the day after his first Major League home run. On April 21, Ohtani hit the 176th home run of his career, passing Hideki Matsui for the most by a Japanese player in MLB history, and hit his 200th on July 13. In the All-Star Game, he hit a three-run home run in the top of the third, scoring the National League's only runs and making him the first and only All-Star player with a win on the mound and a home run at the plate.

On August 3, Ohtani joined the 30–30 club—30 home runs and 30 steals in a season—in his 108th game, becoming the third-fastest player in Major League history to do so. On August 23, Ohtani stole second base in the fourth inning and hit his first career walk-off home run: a grand slam off Colin Poche of the Tampa Bay Rays. His performance made him the fastest player to join the 40–40 club, accomplishing the feat in his 126th game of the season, beating Alfonso Soriano's 2006 record by 21 games. In his September 19 game against the Miami Marlins, Ohtani set multiple MLB and Dodgers franchise records. Ohtani had six hits—a single, two doubles, and three home runs, for 10 RBI—and stole two bases in six at-bats.

He became the first and only player in MLB history to hit 50 home runs and steal 50 bases in a single season. He also became the 16th player in MLB history to reach 10 or more RBI in a single game, and the first since July 7, 2018. He broke the Dodgers records for RBI in a game, passing James Loney and Gil Hodges (9), and home runs in a season, passing Shawn Green (49). Multiple media outlets and sports reporters called it "one of the greatest" single-game performances in history. On September 27, Ohtani became the first player in 23 years to tally 400 total bases in season, and next day, he broke Ichiro's record for most stolen bases in season by a Japanese-born player with 57. Ohtani finished the season by playing in 159 games, with a .310 batting average, and a league leading 54 home runs and 130 RBI while stealing 59 bases.

Ohtani made his postseason debut on October 5, in Game 1 of the National League Division Series, hitting a game-tying three-run home run in his second at-bat. He had four hits in 20 at-bats in that series while striking out 10 times. In the National League Championship Series against the New York Mets, he performed better, with eight hits and two home runs in 22 at-bats to go along with nine walks and only seven strikeouts. His 17 times reaching base and nine runs scored in the series both set new franchise records for a postseason series. The Dodgers claimed the National League pennant with the series win, sending the team and Ohtani to the World Series, the first such appearance for him in his career. In Game 2 of the World Series, Ohtani suffered what was initially described as a left shoulder subluxation when he slid into second base on an attempted steal in the seventh inning. Despite the injury, he was back in the Dodgers lineup the following game. He had only 2 hits in 19 at-bats in the series, with a double, two walks and five strikeouts. The Dodgers defeated the New York Yankees in five games, giving Ohtani his first career World Series championship. After the season, it was revealed that the injury he suffered in Game 2 of the World Series was actually a torn labrum in his left shoulder, for which he underwent surgery upon the conclusion of the series.

After the 2024 season, with his 50–50 performance, Ohtani won the National League Most Valuable Player award unanimously. It was his third career unanimous MVP award, second consecutive unanimous MVP award, and his first in the National League. With this distinction, he became the first and only player in Major League Baseball history to win three MVP awards unanimously, two consecutive unanimous MVP awards, and unanimous MVP awards in both the American and National leagues. Additionally, he became the second player after Frank Robinson to win MVP awards in both leagues. On December 23, Ohtani won his third AP Male Athlete of the Year award, tying Michael Jordan for the second-most wins in history.

==== 2025: Back-to-back World Series titles, NLCS MVP, second unanimous NL MVP ====
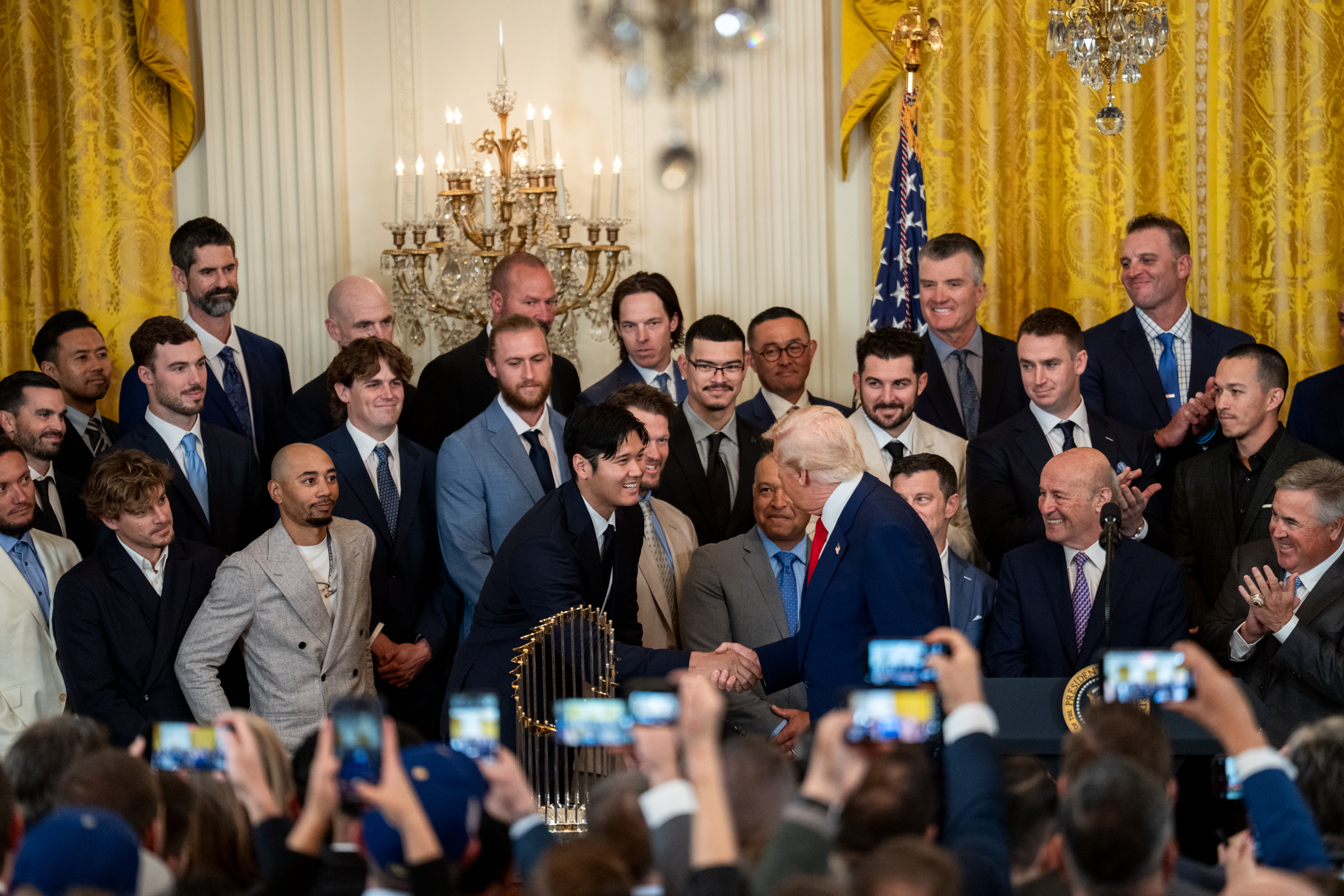
Ohtani with the Dodgers at the White House in 2025

Ohtani started his second year with the Dodgers as the designated hitter on March 18 against the Chicago Cubs in Tokyo, as part of the MLB Tokyo Series 2025, batting 2–for–5 with a double in his first game playing in Japan as a Major Leaguer. On May 30, against the Yankees, he tied the Dodgers record for home runs in a month with 15. In that same game, Ohtani and Aaron Judge became the first reigning MVPs ever to each hit a home run in the first inning of the same game. Ohtani was named the NL Player of the Month in May 2025, after slashing .309/.398/.782, with 15 home runs on the month. On June 15, Ohtani hit two home runs against the San Francisco Giants, the second being the 250th home run of his career. Ohtani made his first pitching appearance as a Dodger, and first since August 2023, on June 16 against the Padres, pitching one inning while allowing one run on two hits.

On June 26, Ohtani was announced as a starting designated hitter for the NL in the All-Star Game, having received the second most votes behind Judge. Ohtani topped the National League and was second in the big leagues with 3.97 million votes, becoming the first designated hitter to start in five straight All-Star Games. On July 23, Ohtani hit a home run in the first inning against the Minnesota Twins, tying a franchise record by homering in his fifth straight game. On August 6, Ohtani recorded his 1,000th career hit when he hit a two-run home run off Cardinals pitcher Matthew Liberatore in the third inning. He became the third Japanese-born player to reach 1,000 hits in the Majors, joining Ichiro Suzuki (3,089) and Hideki Matsui (1,253). Ohtani hit his 40th home run on August 9 against the Toronto Blue Jays in the fifth inning, marking his third consecutive season and fourth overall in which he achieved this. He became the fourth Dodger with multiple seasons with at least 40 homers, joining Duke Snider (5 from 1953 to 1957), Gil Hodges (2 from 1951 and 1954), and Shawn Green (2 from 2001 to 2002). On September 16, Ohtani pitched five no-hit innings and struck out two batters against the Phillies, then hit his 50th home run in the eighth inning. With that performance, he became the first player to hit 50 home runs in back-to-back seasons since Alex Rodriguez in 2001–02 and the sixth player all-time to reach that milestone; he also became the first player in MLB history to record 50 home runs and 50 strikeouts as a pitcher in a single season. On September 23, Ohtani pitched six scoreless innings while striking out eight batters against the Arizona Diamondbacks in his 100th career start as a pitcher. With his performance, he joined Babe Ruth to have started 100 games as a pitcher and hit at least 55 career home runs. On September 26, Ohtani stole his 20th base of the year, becoming the first player in MLB history to hit 50 home runs and steal 20 bases in two separate seasons. On September 28, Ohtani hit his 55th home run in the seventh inning against the Seattle Mariners, setting a new career-high and passing his single-season franchise record with that homer in the Dodgers' final regular-season game.

Ohtani finished the 2025 season batting .282 with 55 home runs, 102 RBI and 20 stolen bases. He led the National League with 146 runs scored, 380 total bases, 89 extra-base hits, and a 1.014 OPS. He also recorded a career-high 109 walks to become the first player in MLB history to hit 50 home runs, draw 100 walks, and steal 20 bases in one season. As a pitcher, he posted a 1–1 record with a 2.87 ERA in 14 games while striking out 62 batters in 47 innings.

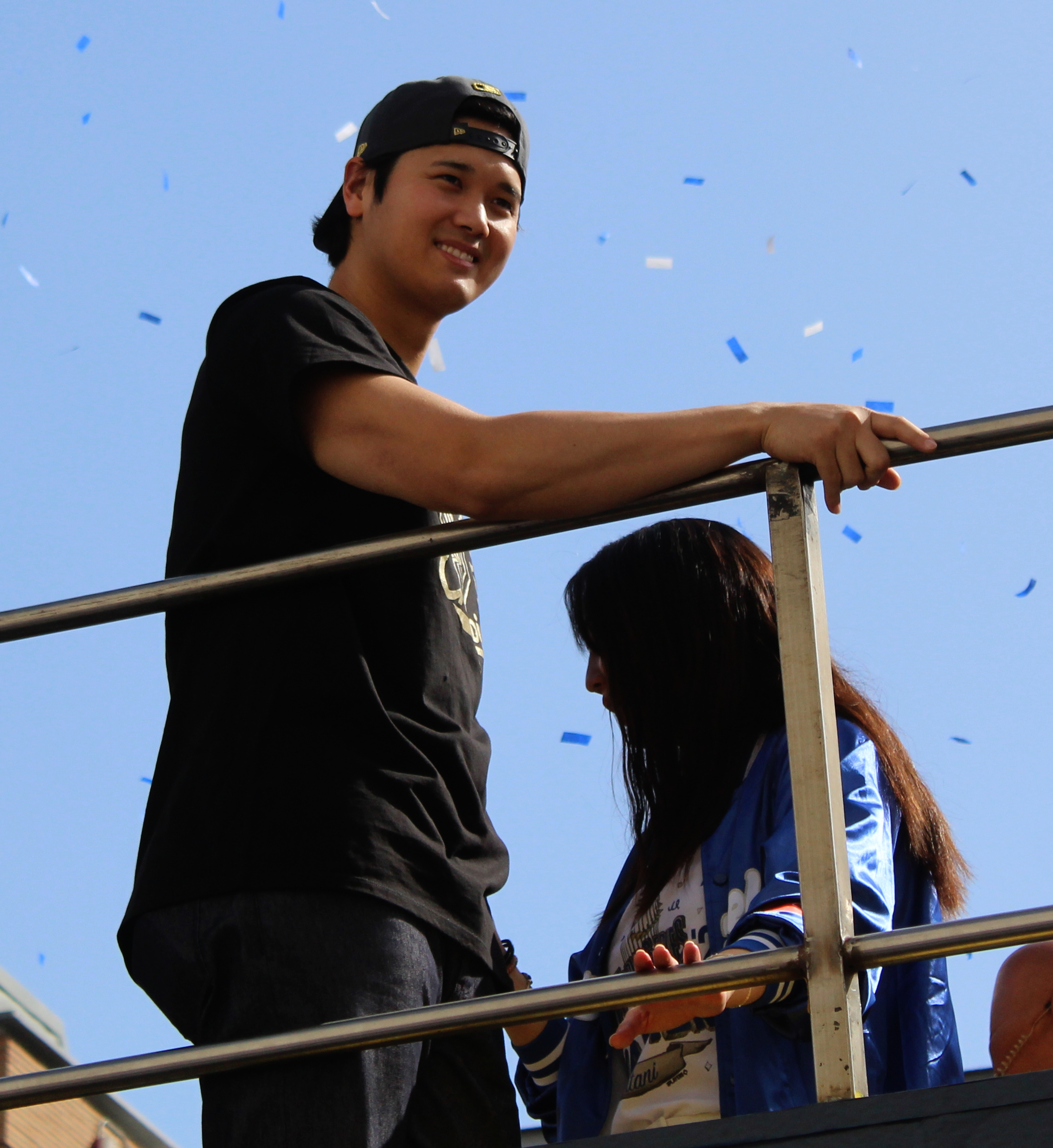
Ohtani at the 2025 World Series championship parade

In Game 1 of the National League Wild Card Series against the Cincinnati Reds, Ohtani hit two home runs as he became the second player with two 113-mile-per-hour (182 km/h) home runs in a postseason game in the Statcast era (since 2015), joining Giancarlo Stanton in Game 2 of the 2025 American League Wild Card Series. It was also Ohtani's first multi-homer game in the postseason. Ohtani then made his first career postseason start in the opening game of the Division Series against the Philadelphia Phillies, striking out nine while allowing three runs on three hits and one walk in six innings, to earn the win. Ohtani's next start on the mound was in Game 4 of the National League Championship Series against the Milwaukee Brewers, where he set multiple MLB records and helped the Dodgers sweep the series. Ohtani struck out 10 batters in six-plus scoreless innings while also hitting three home runs in three at-bats, becoming the first pitcher in history to do so. He led off the bottom of the first inning with a home run, becoming the first pitcher to hit a leadoff homer in any MLB game. He also became the first pitcher with multiple home runs in a postseason game. Several sportswriters considered Ohtani's performance in Game 4 as one of the greatest of all time and he was named the 2025 NLCS MVP.

In Game 1 of the World Series, Ohtani hit a two-run home run in the top of the seventh inning, it was his sixth homer of the postseason and the first World Series home run of his career, joining Hideki Matsui (2003) as the only Japanese-born players to hit a home run in a World Series. In Game 3 of the World Series, Ohtani recorded four hits—two doubles and two home runs—and drew five walks, four of which were intentional, setting multiple MLB postseason records. Ohtani reached base nine times during the game—a postseason record—and tied Stan Hack (1942), Johnny Burnett (1932) and Max Carey (1922) for the all-time MLB record. He recorded four extra-base hits in four at-bats, joining Frank Isbell (1906) for the most in a World Series game. He became the first player with three multi-home run games as well as multiple games with at least 12 total bases in a single postseason. He also became the first player to be intentionally walked four times in a postseason game. After starting on the mound in Game 4, Ohtani was the starting pitcher for the Dodgers in Game 7. He pitched only 2 1/3 innings in the game, allowing five hits, three runs, and two walks, while recording two hits as a hitter. The Dodgers rallied back to win the game in extra innings, giving Ohtani his second-career World Series championship. He finished the World Series batting .333, with six extra-base hits (including three home runs), nine walks, five RBI, and an OPS of 1.278.

After the conclusion of the season, Ohtani won his fourth career MVP award unanimously—his second consecutive NL MVP and third consecutive overall. He became the first player in Major League history to win multiple MVPs in both leagues and only the second player to win four MVP Awards after Barry Bonds (7). He joined Bonds (2001–04) as the only players to win MVP in at least three consecutive seasons. He also joined Joe Morgan (1975–76) as the only players who have won an MVP Award and the World Series in back-to-back seasons. Ohtani received his fifth straight Edgar Martínez Outstanding Designated Hitter Award, tying him with David Ortiz for the most consecutive wins since the award's inception in 1973. He also received the Hank Aaron Award for the third straight year, joining Alex Rodriguez (2001–03) as the only players who have won in three consecutive seasons.

==== 2026 ====
On April 15, against the New York Mets, Ohtani pitched but did not bat, marking the first time he had done so since May 2021. He recorded 10 strikeouts while allowing only two hits, two walks, and his first earned run of the season, earning his second win. The run ended his streak of 32 2/3 consecutive scoreless innings dating back to 2025, the longest such streak by a Japanese-born pitcher in MLB history. Ohtani began the season by reaching base in every game he had appeared in dating back to August 24 of the previous season. On April 10, he surpassed Ichiro Suzuki for the longest on-base streak by a Japanese-born player in MLB history, with 44 games. On April 21, he extended his streak to 53 games, tying Shawn Green for the longest on-base streak in Los Angeles era Dodgers history, before being broken the following day. Ohtani was awarded NL Pitcher of the Month for April after posting a 0.60 ERA across five starts. On July 7, Ohtani hit his 300th career home run against Colorado Rockies starter Michael Lorenzen in the bottom of the first inning. Ohtani became the 170th member of the 300-homer club and he became the first Japanese-born player to reach the milestone.

Ohtani's last start as a pitcher was on July 3rd, after which he experienced some discomfort with his right biceps. He was initially only supposed to miss a start or two but continuing discomfort kept derailing his plans to get back on the mound and eventually the Dodgers ruled him out from pitching for the rest of the season. His final pitching numbers for 2026 were 8–2 with a 1.79 ERA and 95 strikeouts in 14 games.

However, his injury issues, which also included left knee problems, also affected his hitting and sapped his power as he did not hit another home run after August 18. He finished the season batting .275/.377/.512 with 30 home runs and 81 RBI in 139 games. In Game 4 of the 2026 NLCS he hit a three-run home run, his first of any kind since August 18, to give the Dodgers a 4–0 lead. He batted .192 with a .631 OPS and ten strikeouts, with five hits in the playoffs; the Dodgers' season ended when they were swept by the Brewers in the NLCS.

On November 2, Ohtani was named a finalist for the National League Most Valuable Player Award alongside Pete Crow-Armstrong and Brice Turang.

== International career ==
=== 2012 WBSC U-18 Baseball World Cup ===
Ohtani was selected to Japan's national under-18 team that eventually finished in sixth place at the 2012 U-18 Baseball World Cup in Seoul.

=== 2015 WBSC Premier12 ===
In the inaugural WBSC Premier12 tournament, Ohtani earned a bronze medal with Team Japan. He was the ace of Japan's pitching staff, which also featured Kenta Maeda. Ohtani made two pitching appearances for Samurai Japan, both against Japan's arch-rival South Korea, winning Game 1 of the opening round and getting a no-decision in the semifinals. Ohtani was subsequently named to the Premier12 All-World Team and was named the 2015 World Baseball Softball Confederation Baseball Player of the Year.

=== 2017 World Baseball Classic ===
Ohtani was on Team Japan's 28-man roster for the 2017 World Baseball Classic but was forced to withdraw due to an ankle injury.

=== 2023 World Baseball Classic ===
Ohtani played for Team Japan in the 2023 World Baseball Classic. He was named the Pool B MVP for his hitting and pitching performances in the group stage of the tournament. He earned the save in the championship game after pitching the final inning of Japan's win over the U.S., striking out then-teammate Mike Trout with a 3–2 slider to clinch Japan's WBC championship. Ohtani won the tournament's MVP award after batting .435/.606/.739 as a hitter and posting a 1.86 ERA and 11 strikeouts in 9 2/3 innings as a pitcher.

After helping Japan clinch its third WBC title, Ohtani became the first player to be named to the All-WBC team at two separate positions, having been named to the 2023 team as both a DH and a pitcher.

=== 2026 World Baseball Classic ===
Ohtani played for Team Japan in the 2026 World Baseball Classic strictly as the designated hitter. In the opening game against Chinese Taipei, he went 3–for–4 with a grand slam and five RBIs, setting a record for the most RBIs (5) in a single inning in WBC history. His strong offensive production during the group stage helped Japan secure an undefeated record in Pool C and advance to the quarterfinals. In the quarterfinal against Venezuela, Ohtani hit a game-tying leadoff home run, but Venezuela overcame an early deficit to eliminate Japan from contention.

During the tournament, Ohtani batted .462/.611/1.231 with three home runs and seven RBIs and was named to the All-WBC team as a DH.

== Awards and achievements ==
=== Honors ===
MLB

- 2× World Series champion (2024, 2025)
- 2× American League Most Valuable Player (2021, 2023)
- 2× National League Most Valuable Player (2024, 2025)
- National League Championship Series Most Valuable Player (2025)
- Commissioner's Historic Achievement Award (2021)
- American League Rookie of the Year (2018)
- 4× American League Player of the Month (June 2021, July 2021, June 2023, July 2023)
- 2× National League Player of the Month (September 2024, May 2025)
- National League Pitcher of the Month (April 2026)
- American League Rookie of the Month (April 2018, September 2018)
- 7× American League Player of the Week (April 8, 2018; September 9, 2018; June 20, 2021; July 4, 2021; June 18, 2023; July 2, 2023; July 30, 2023)
- 4× National League Player of the Week (May 5, 2024; June 23, 2024; September 22, 2024; September 29, 2024)
- 8× All-MLB Team selection:
  - 6× All-MLB First Team (2021, 2022, 2023², 2024, 2025)
  - 2× All-MLB Second Team (2021, 2022)
- 6× MLB All-Star selection (2021, 2022, 2023, 2024, 2025, 2026)
- 3× Hank Aaron Award (2023–2025)
- 4× Silver Slugger Award at Designated Hitter (2021, 2023–2025)
- 5× Edgar Martínez Outstanding Designated Hitter Award (2021, 2022–2025)
- 3× Los Angeles Angels Player of the Year (2021, 2022, 2023)
- 2× Nick Adenhart Pitcher of the Year Award (2021, 2022)
- Players Choice Award for Player of the Year (2021)
- 2× Players Choice Award for American League Outstanding Player (2021, 2023)
- Players Choice Award for National League Outstanding Player (2024)

NPB

- Japan Series champion (2016)
- Pacific League Most Valuable Player (2016)
- 5× NPB All-Star selection (2013–2017)
- NPB All-Star Game MVP (2016 Game 2)
- 3× Best Nine Award (2015–2016²)
- Best Battery Award (2015)

National

- World Baseball Classic champion (2023)
- World Baseball Classic Most Valuable Player (2023)
- World Baseball Classic Pool B Most Valuable Player (2023)
- 3× All-WBC Team selection (2023², 2026)
- WBSC Premier12 bronze medalist (2015)
- WBSC Premier12 All-World Team selection (2015)
- WBSC Player of the Year (2015)
- 3× Japan Professional Sports Grand Prize (2016, 2018, 2023)

Media

- 4× AP Male Athlete of the Year (2021, 2023–2025)
- 2× Hickok Belt (2021, 2024)
- 8× ESPY Award winner:
  - 6× Best Major League Baseball Player (2021, 2022, 2023, 2024, 2025, 2026)
  - Best Male Athlete (2022)
  - Best Single-Game Performance (2026)
- 2× Baseball America Major League Player of the Year (2021, 2023)
- Baseball America Rookie of the Year Award (2018)
- Baseball Digest Player of the Year (2021)
- 2× The Sporting News Athlete of the Year (2021, 2024)
- 2× The Sporting News MLB Player of the Year Award (2021, 2024)
- The Sporting News Rookie of the Year Award (2018)
- Time 100 Most Influential People (2021)
- Time 100 Most Influential People in Sports – Icons (2026)
- Forbes Iconoclast 50 Most Impactful Leaders (2026)
- Forbes 30 Under 30 Asia – Entertainment & Sports (2018)
- 2× Forbes list of the world's top-10 highest-paid athletes (2025–2026)
- Topps All-Star Rookie Team (2018)

State/Local

- City stamp and postcard collection in Mizusawa, Iwate (2023)
- May 17 recognised as the "Shohei Ohtani Day" in Los Angeles County, California (2024)
- Special Japan Airlines aircraft named the "Dream Sho Jet" (2024)

=== MLB statistical achievements ===
American League statistical leader
Category	Times	Seasons
Home runs leader	1	2023
Extra base hits leader	1	2023
On-base percentage leader	1	2023
Slugging percentage leader	1	2023
On-base plus slugging leader	1	2023
Total bases leader	1	2023
Intentional base on balls leader	1	2021
Triples leader	1	2021
At bats per home run leader	1	2021
Power–speed number leader	1	2021
Wins above replacement leader	2	2021, 2023
Win probability added leader	1	2021
Strikeouts per nine innings pitched leader	1	2022
Notes: Per Baseball-Reference.com. Through the 2023 season.

National League statistical leader
Category	Times	Seasons
Home runs leader	1	2024
Extra base hits leader	2	2024, 2025
On-base percentage leader	1	2024
Slugging percentage leader	2	2024, 2025
On-base plus slugging leader	2	2024, 2025
Runs batted in leader	1	2024
Runs scored leader	2	2024, 2025
Total bases leader	2	2024, 2025
Intentional base on balls leader	1	2025
At bats per home run leader	1	2024
Power–speed number leader	1	2024
Wins above replacement leader	1	2024
Win probability added leader	2	2024, 2025
Notes: Per Baseball-Reference.com. Through the 2025 season.

- 2× 50 home run club – 2024, 2025
- 50–50 club – September 19, 2024, vs Miami Marlins
- Hitting for the cycle – June 13, 2019, vs Tampa Bay Rays

== Player profile ==
=== Pitching ===
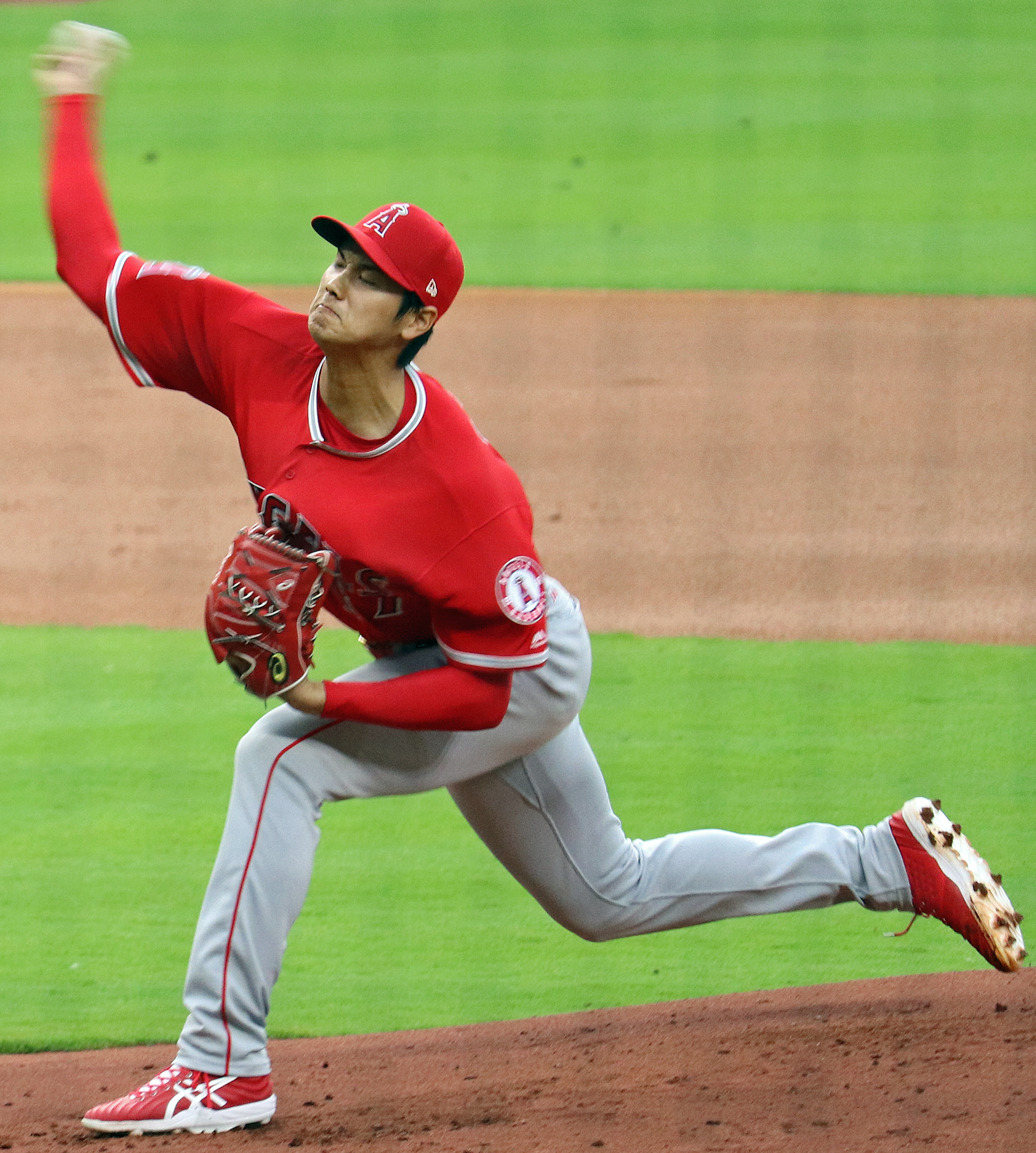
Ohtani pitching for the Angels in 2018

Ohtani is a 193-centimetre (76 in), 210-pound (95 kg) right-handed starting pitcher. With an overhand delivery, he throws a four-seam fastball averaging 97 miles per hour (156 km/h) topping out at 102.5 mph (165 km/h), an 86–93-mile-per-hour (138–150 km/h) forkball/split-finger fastball with late diving action, an occasional curveball, and a solid slider at 85–91 miles per hour (137–146 km/h). He posted a walks per nine innings rate of 3.3 across his NPB career. Ohtani has been compared to Justin Verlander by some MLB scouts because of his ability and affinity for throwing harder in high-leverage spots, as well as later in games. Whereas most pitchers throw only a little harder in big spots than they do in normal ones and most pitchers lose speed as the game goes on, Ohtani, like Verlander, is able to reserve power and staying power in order to conserve energy without throwing max effort on every offering.

=== Batting and fielding ===
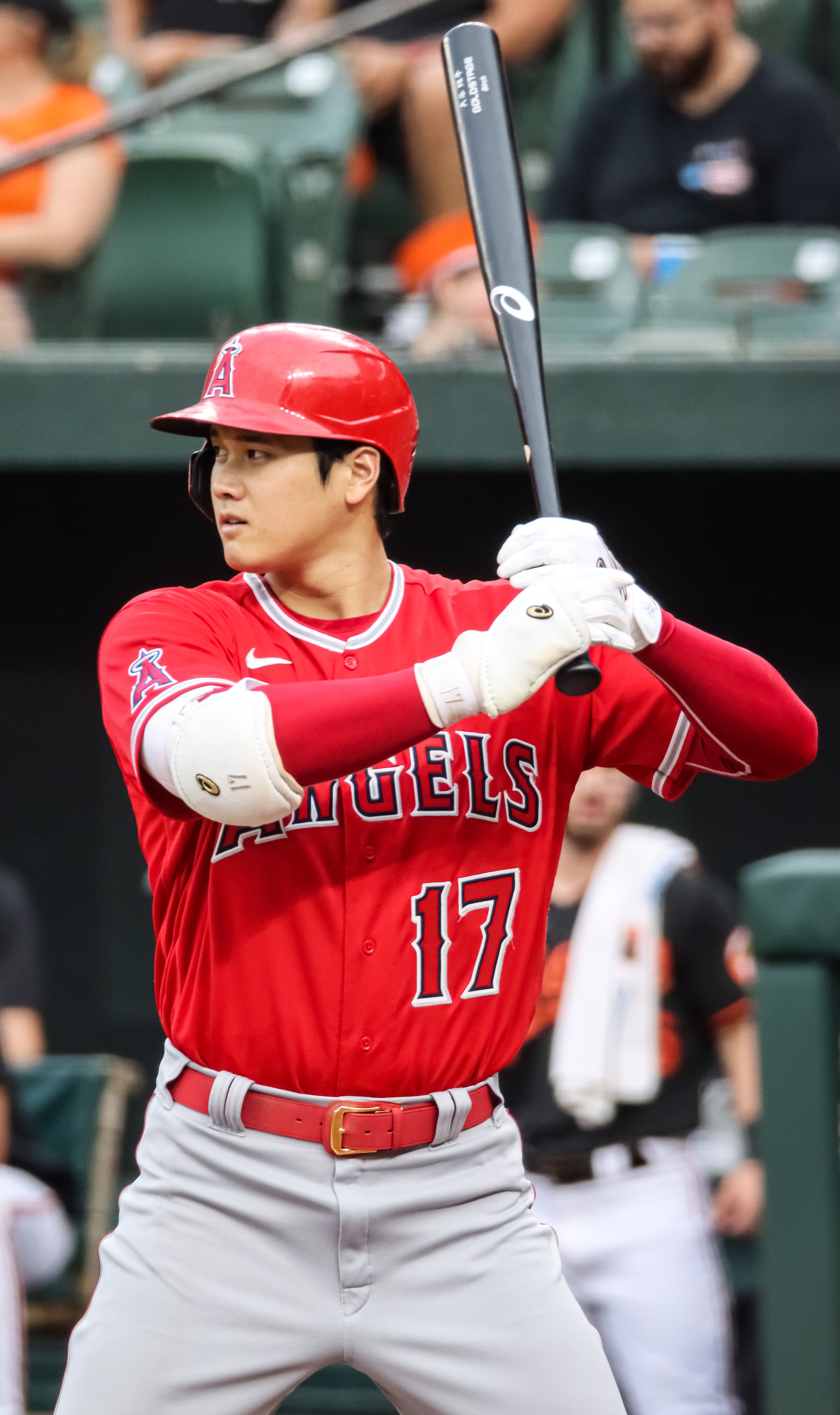
Ohtani batting in 2022

Ohtani is a left-handed batter. He is a designated hitter and often considered a power hitter who has led MLB in home runs multiple times. Ohtani also demonstrates elite baserunner skills, with a sprint speed and feet-first sliding technique allowing him to have been a league leader in stolen bases, bunt hits and infield-hit rate. Scouts have timed Ohtani running from the batter's box to first base in as little as 3.8 seconds. For the 2021 season, his 28.8 feet per second (19.6 mph) sprint speed ranked in the 92nd percentile of all players, as did his 3.51 second 80-foot split and he also recorded the fastest home to first average sprint time in the Majors at 4.09 seconds, while recording a then career-high 26 stolen bases.

=== Comparisons to Babe Ruth ===
Ohtani's success as both a pitcher and a hitter has frequently prompted comparisons to Babe Ruth, the most prominent two-way player in Major League Baseball history. A 2021 60 Minutes profile of Ohtani was titled "Japan's Babe Ruth". Ohtani and Ruth share several two-way distinctions. In August 2022, Ohtani joined Ruth as the only players in MLB to hit at least 10 home runs and win at least 10 games as a pitcher in the same season. In May 2023 he became the second player, after Ruth, to record 500 career strikeouts as a pitcher and 100 home runs as a hitter.

Writers have emphasized distinctions between the two – Ruth's significant two-way play was largely confined to the 1918 and 1919 seasons before he became a full-time hitter, whereas Ohtani has performed as an elite starting pitcher and hitter within the same season across multiple years. Commentators have cautioned that era differences complicate any direct comparison. Writing for CBS Sports, Matt Snyder noted that Ruth played before the integration of the major leagues and under different patterns of pitcher usage, while Ohtani has had the benefit of modern training and analytics, making a strict statistical comparison of the two difficult.

== Personal life and public image ==
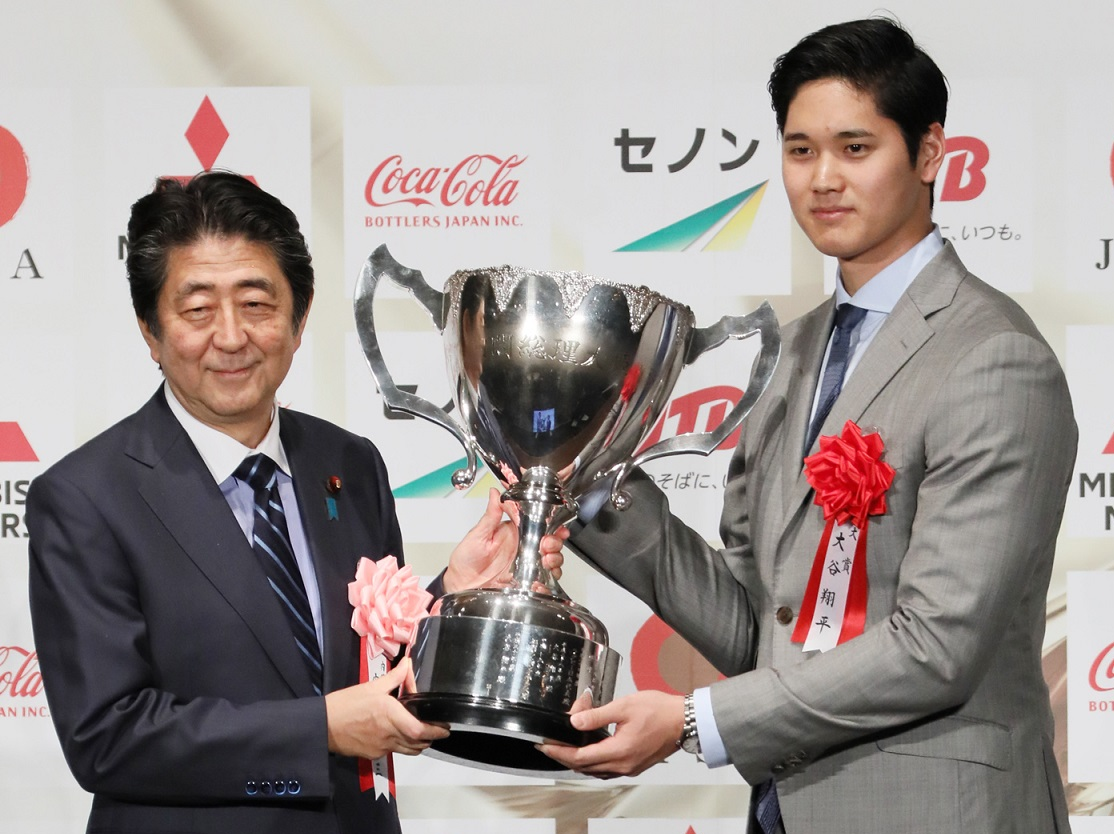
Shinzo Abe awarding Ohtani the Prime Minister Trophy at the 2018 Japan Professional Sports Grand Prize award ceremony.

Ohtani, nicknamed "Shotime", is one of Japan's most celebrated athletes, but has faced intense media scrutiny from the Japanese press his whole adult life. Due to the high-profile nature of his two-way efforts, the Fighters protected Ohtani from some of the media onslaught, while Ohtani tended to keep to the team dormitory and the gym, leading a semi-monastic, baseball-centric existence, a byproduct of holding down two jobs in the big leagues.

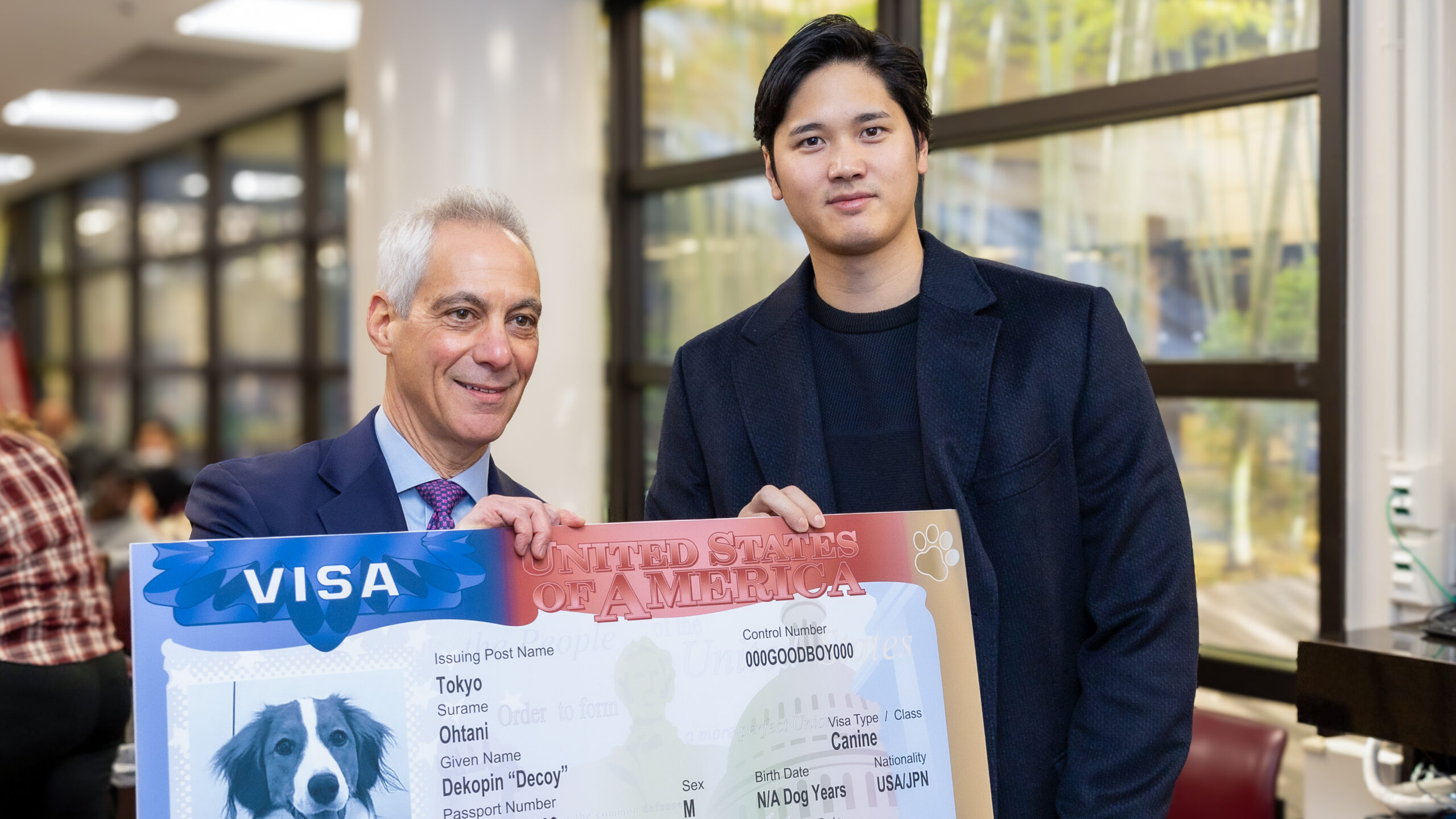
U.S. Ambassador to Japan Rahm Emanuel with Ohtani holding a visa for Ohtani's dog, Dekopin

Ohtani has a Kooikerhondje dog named Dekopin, also known as Decoy. The dog received an honorary visa from the Embassy of the United States, Tokyo. In connection with his $7.85 million home purchase, Ohtani established an LLC named "Decopin", which he named after his dog.

Ohtani is married to former professional basketball player Mamiko Tanaka. Ohtani announced in February 2024 that he had married but declined to disclose his wife's identity except to say, "She's a normal Japanese woman". The next month, he revealed her identity by posting a photograph of himself with Tanaka. On December 29, 2024, Ohtani announced on Instagram that they were expecting their first child. On April 17, 2025, Ohtani returned to Los Angeles during a Dodgers road trip in anticipation of the baby's arrival. Two days later, he announced on Instagram the birth of their first child, a daughter. In an open letter shared to his Instagram account on June 20, 2026, he announced that his wife had given birth to their second child.

=== Endorsements and mass media coverage ===
Ohtani has been represented by agent Nez Balelo of CAA Sports since 2017, shortly after announcing his plans to pursue an MLB career. He was listed in Forbes 30 Under 30 Asia class of 2018 in the field of Entertainment & Sports. In 2021, Ohtani was named to Time 100's list of most influential people of 2021 and awarded the Commissioner's Historic Achievement Award by Commissioner Rob Manfred. Since 2023, Ohtani's jerseys have sold more than any other player worldwide. Ohtani was the first Asian player to be a cover athlete of MLB: The Show in 2022. In 2025, Ohtani's likeness was added to Fortnite, making him the first MLB player available in the game.

In 2023, Ohtani endorsement earnings were estimated to be an MLB league-leading $35–40 million, up from his MLB league-leading $20 million endorsement earnings in 2022, which tripled from his MLB league-leading $6 million endorsement earnings in 2021. By 2025, his estimated endorsements had risen to $100 million for the year. Ohtani is a brand ambassador of 20 companies across both sides of the Pacific, including New Balance and Fanatics/Topps, in the U.S. and Hugo Boss, Kosé, Porsche Japan, Kowa, Mitsubishi Bank, Japan Airlines, Salesforce, Nishikawa Co., and Seiko in Japan.

Ohtani's previous partnerships included Asics, Descente, Oakley, New Era, FTX, Savas, and Aquarius. On November 16, 2021, it was announced that Ohtani joined cryptocurrency exchange FTX as a global ambassador, partnering on various animal charitable initiatives; however, in November 2022, FTX filed for bankruptcy, wiping out billions of dollars in customer funds. Ohtani, alongside other spokespeople, was sued for promoting unregistered securities through a class-action lawsuit with his lawyers filing for Ohtani's dismissal from the FTX lawsuit in April 2023.

=== Interpreter gambling scandal ===
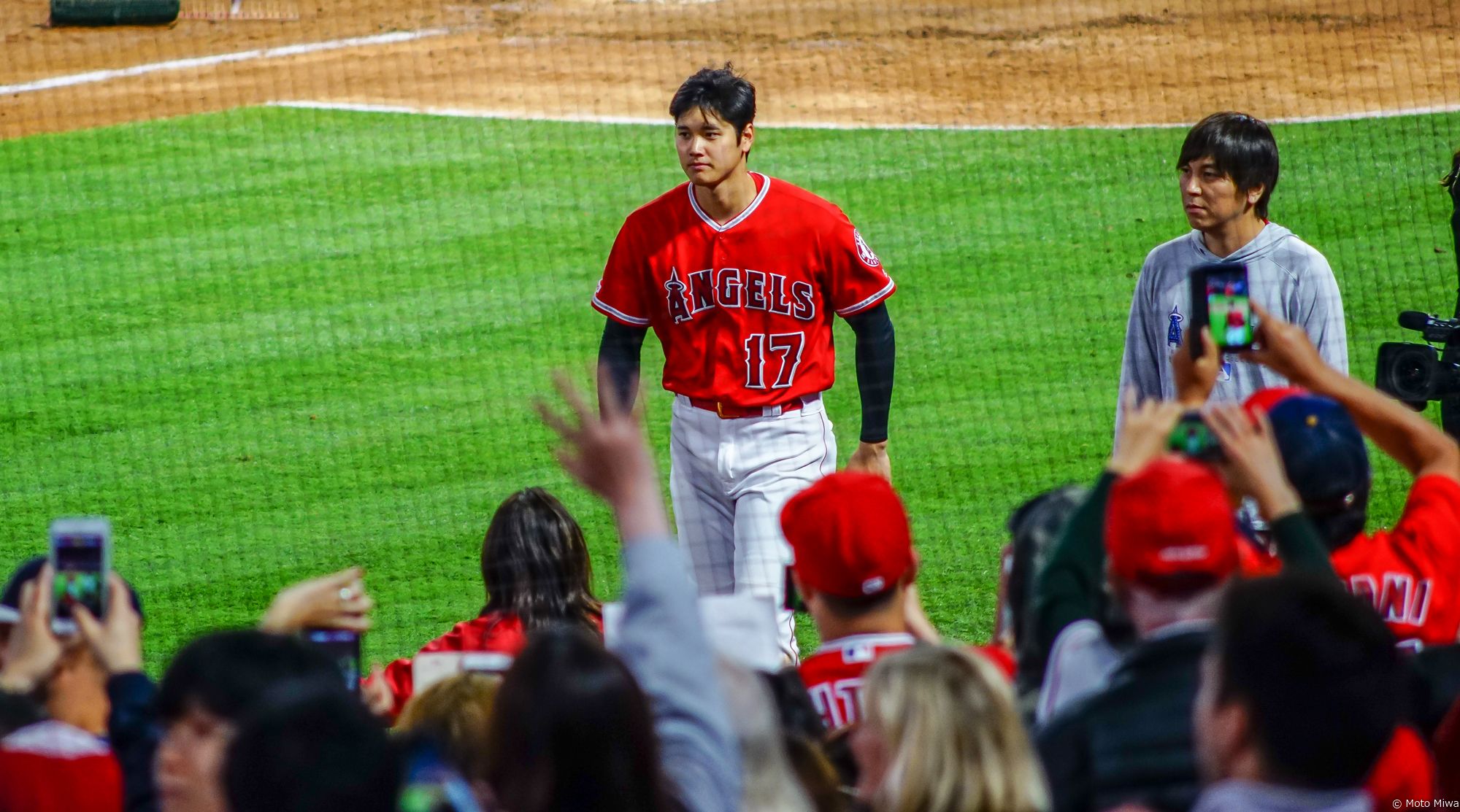
Ohtani with Ippei Mizuhara in 2019

While not fluent, Ohtani speaks passable English as well as Spanish, but prefers to speak to the media through an interpreter. Ippei Mizuhara was Ohtani's personal interpreter with the Angels and Dodgers, having known Ohtani since he was 18, starting in 2013 during Ohtani's days with the Fighters. Mizuhara's role went beyond solely translating to include confidant, conditioning coach, and throwing partner.

In March 2024, an ESPN investigation uncovered $4.5 million in wire payments from Ohtani's bank account to a Southern California bookmaking operation under federal investigation. It was also found that, between January and March 2024, Mizuhara had purchased approximately $325,000 worth of baseball cards from online resellers such as eBay from Ohtani's bank account with the intent to resell them later for his own personal profit. On March 19, Mizuhara told ESPN that the money was for repaying his gambling debts. He said he had asked Ohtani for the money and that Ohtani himself transferred the funds to the bookie. Mizuhara also told this story to the Dodgers clubhouse after a game that day. However, as ESPN prepared to air the interview on the morning of March 20, Ohtani's law firm issued a statement reading, "We discovered that Shohei has been the victim of a massive theft, and we are turning the matter over to the authorities." That afternoon, the Dodgers fired Mizuhara, who had signed a contract with the team when Ohtani joined. Will Ireton, who had served as an interpreter for Kenta Maeda, took over as Ohtani's interpreter. At a March 25 press conference, Ohtani made his first public statement about the incident, telling reporters that he had never bet on sports or had any knowledge of the debt until the team meeting on March 19.

On April 11, the US Attorney for the Central District of California charged Mizuhara with one count of bank fraud after an investigation determined that he had impersonated Ohtani with his bank, had illegally changed settings on the bank account and had stolen over $16 million from that account. On June 4, following Mizuhara's guilty plea, Ohtani was officially cleared of any wrongdoing in the affair. In February 2025, Mizuhara was sentenced to repay Ohtani $17 million along with a 57-month prison sentence.

On May 9, 2024, Lionsgate Television announced the development of a scripted series based on the interpreter gambling scandal.

== See also ==
- Los Angeles Angels award winners and league leaders
- Los Angeles Dodgers award winners and league leaders
- List of Los Angeles Angels team records
- List of Los Angeles Dodgers team records
- List of largest sports contracts
- List of Major League Baseball annual home run leaders
- List of Major League Baseball annual runs batted in leaders
- List of Major League Baseball annual runs scored leaders
- List of Major League Baseball annual triples leaders
- List of Major League Baseball career home run leaders
- List of Major League Baseball career OPS leaders
- List of Major League Baseball career slugging percentage leaders
- List of Major League Baseball home run records
- List of Major League Baseball leaders in home runs by pitchers
- List of Major League Baseball players from Japan
- List of Major League Baseball players to hit for the cycle
- List of Major League Baseball runs batted in records
- List of Major League Baseball single-game hits leaders
- List of Major League Baseball single-game runs batted in leaders
- List of Major League Baseball stolen base records
- List of Nippon Professional Baseball earned run average champions
- List of World Series starting pitchers
- Shohei Ohtani: Beyond the Dream

== Notes ==
Achievements
Preceded by Jorge Polanco	Hitting for the cycle June 13, 2019	Succeeded by Jake Bauers
Awards
Preceded by Marcus Semien	American League Player of the Month; June & July 2021	Succeeded by José Abreu
Preceded by Aaron Judge	American League Player of the Month; June & July 2023	Succeeded by Julio Rodríguez
Preceded by Corbin Carroll	National League Player of the Month; September 2024	Succeeded by Pete Alonso
Preceded by Pete Alonso	National League Player of the Month; May 2025	Succeeded by Juan Soto
Preceded by Yoshinobu Yamamoto	National League Pitcher of the Month; April 2026	Succeeded by Cristopher Sánchez
