= Kooikerhondje =

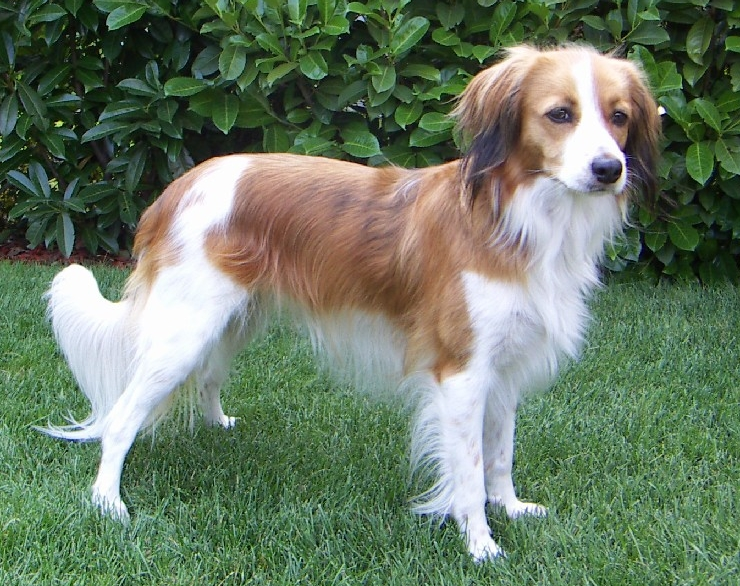
- A two-year-old Kooikerhondje
- Other names: Kooiker; Nederlandse Kooikerhondje; Dutch Spaniel; Dutch Decoy Spaniel; Decoy dog
- Origin: Netherlands
Kennel club standards
- Dutch Kennel Club: standard
- American Kennel Club: standard
- Fédération Cynologique Internationale: standard

The Kooikerhondje (Note: Dutch pronunciation: [koːi̯kərhɔɲcə]; roughly translating to "decoy dog" in Dutch) is a small spaniel-type dog breed of Dutch ancestry that was originally used as a working dog, particularly in a decoy to lure ducks. The breed dates back to the 16th century and makes frequent appearances in paintings from the Dutch Golden Age.

== Description ==
=== Appearance ===
The Kooikerhondje is a small, spaniel-like sporting dog. Originally bred in the Netherlands as a duck hunting dog, it has a white plumed tail for the purpose of attracting ducks.

The preferred height at the withers is 40 centimetres (16 in) for males and 38 centimetres (15 in) for females. The FCI standard allows a range of 38 to 41 centimetres (15 to 16 in) for males, and 36 to 39 centimetres (14 to 15 in) for females. The breed has a wavy, medium-length double coat, and its coloration is white and orange-red. Some Kooikerhondjes have black ear tips, which are referred to as "earrings".

=== Health ===
A number of heritable diseases have been identified in the Kooikerhondje, including inflammatory myopathy, Type III von Willebrand's disease, necrotising myelopathy, renal dysplasia, patellar luxation, and ataxia. A Dutch study of 842 Kooikerhondjes found that patellar luxation was prevalent in 24% of dogs scanned. During the time period of the study — which started in 1994 and ended in 2011 — the prevalence of the condition fell from 28% to 19%, although the prevalence is still higher than for other spaniel dogs.

== History ==
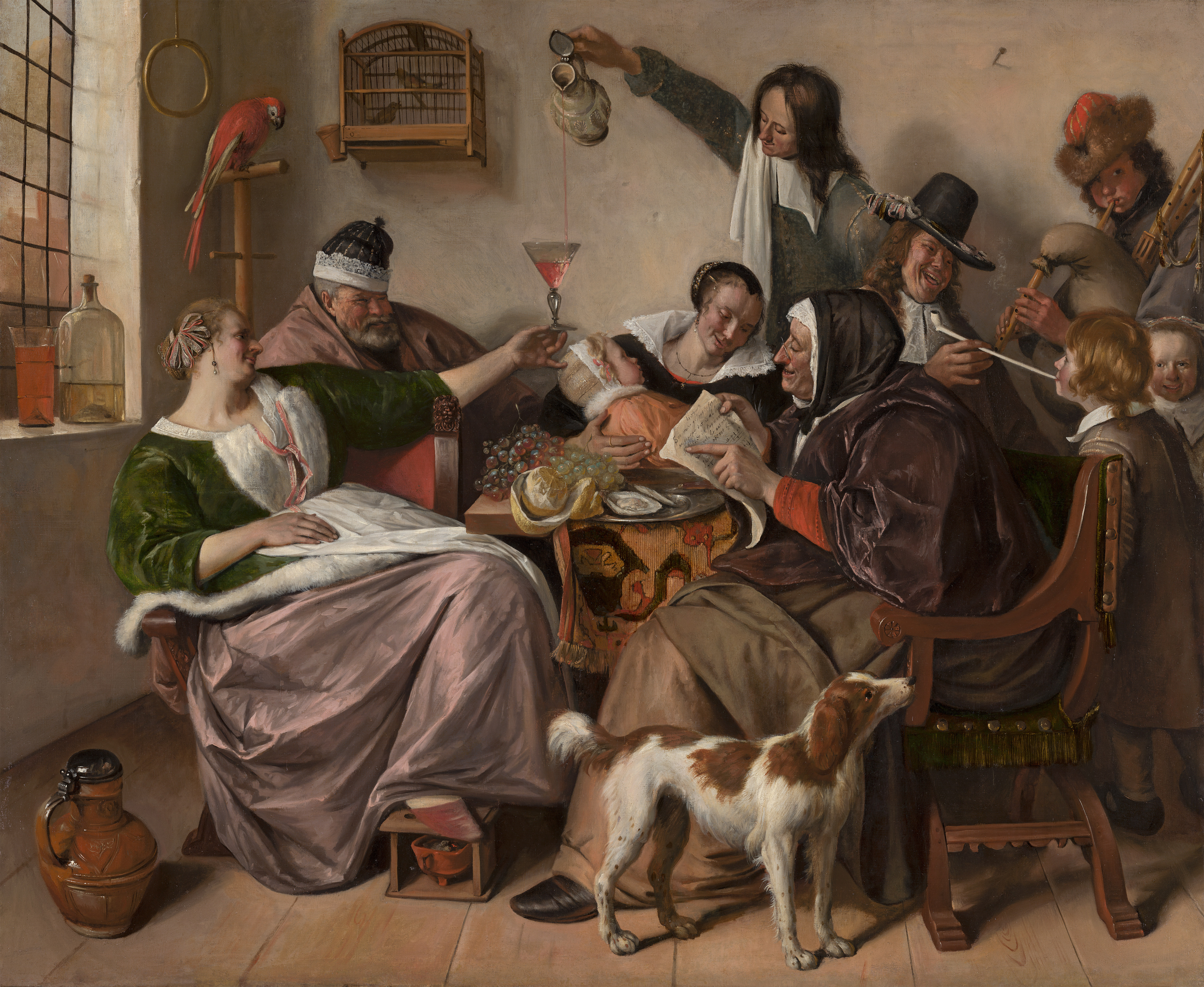
The painting As the Old Sing, So Pipe the Young by Jan Steen features a Kooikerhondje.

The Kooikerhondje was developed in the Netherlands sometime around the 16th century in order to lure ducks into duck decoys where hunters could easily catch the fowl. The hunting style of the Kooikerhondje was inspired by foxes, as Dutch hunters realized ducks were enticed by foxes playing near water, as long as they did not make eye contact. The Kooikerhondje frequently appears in paintings by Dutch masters such as Jan Steen, Rembrandt, and Johannes Vermeer. The breed is believed to be an ancestor of the Nova Scotia Duck Tolling Retriever.

The breed almost became extinct during World War II until Baroness van Hardenbroek van Ammerstol rescued it. The breed was not officially recognized by the Dutch Kennel Club until 1971 and has since been imported into other countries and recognized officially. In January 2013, the Kennel Club announced it was reclassifying the Kooikerhondje from the gun dog group to the utility group effective from January 2014. The decision was reached after discussions with the British breed clubs and unanimous agreement was achieved.

The Kooikerhondje was recognized by the American Kennel Club in 2018. The breed gained fame in the United States in the 2020s, in part due to Decoy Ohtani, a Kooikerhondje owned by baseball player Shohei Ohtani.

== See also ==
- List of dog breeds
- Waterfowl hunting
