= Starting pitcher =

Baseball or softball pitcher who throws the first pitch for their team in a game

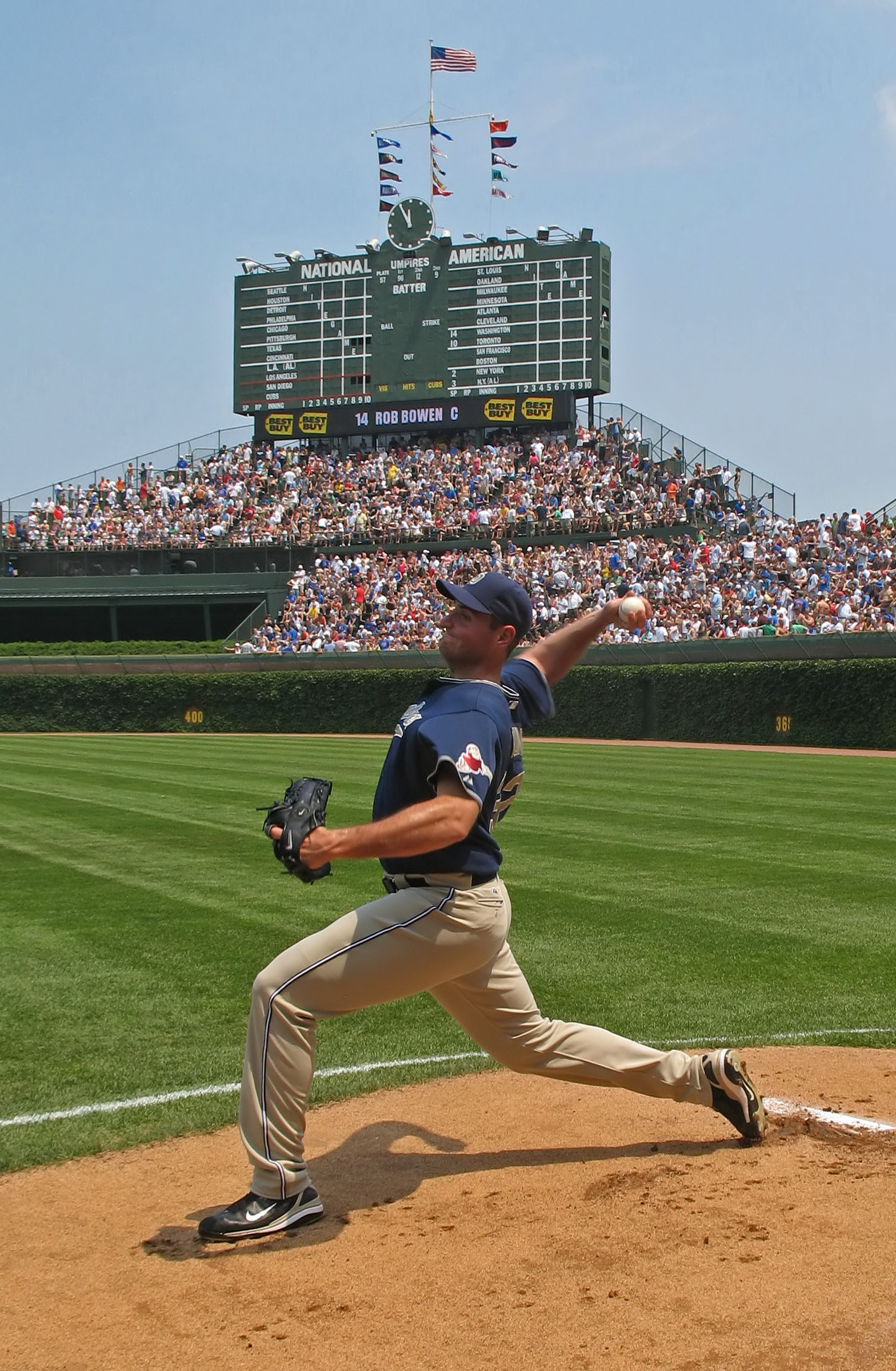
Chris Young warms up in the bullpen before a game at Wrigley Field minutes before the 12:05 start (see scoreboard clock).

In baseball (hardball or softball), a starting pitcher or starter is the first pitcher in the game for each team. A pitcher is credited with a game started if they throw the first pitch to the opponent's first batter of a game. Starting pitchers are expected to pitch for a significant portion of the game, although their ability to do this depends on many factors, including effectiveness, stamina, health, and strategy.

A starting pitcher in professional baseball usually rests three, four, or five days after pitching a game before pitching in another. Therefore, most professional baseball teams have four, five or six starting pitchers on their rosters. These pitchers, and the sequence in which they pitch, is known as the rotation. A team's best starter is known as the ace, and is almost always the first man to pitch in the rotation. In modern baseball, a five-man rotation is most common.

In contrast, a pitcher who enters the game after the first pitch of the game is a relief pitcher. Occasionally, an opener is used for only a few innings, and is replaced by a long reliever or a pitcher who would typically be a starting pitcher.

== Workload ==
Under ideal circumstances, a manager of a baseball team would prefer a starting pitcher to pitch as many innings as possible in a game. Most regular starting pitchers pitch for at least five innings on a regular basis, and if a pitcher is unable to do so, there is a high probability that he will, in the future, be relegated to duty in the bullpen. In modern baseball, a starting pitcher is rarely expected to pitch for more than seven or eight innings, at which point, responsibility for the game is passed to relief pitchers, including specialist pitchers such as setup pitchers and closers.

Often, a starting pitcher is subject to a pitch count, meaning the manager will remove him from the game once he has thrown a specific number of pitches. The most common pitch count for a modern pitcher is about 100, and it is now rare for a starting pitcher to throw more than 125 pitches in a game. Pitch count limits are especially common for starting pitchers who are recovering from injury.

At the youth level, such as in Little League Baseball, pitch counts are usually capped at a certain point as well as required rest before a pitcher can pitch again.

In the 2018 MLB season, the Tampa Bay Rays debuted a variant of the starting pitcher dubbed the "opener," whose role is a hybrid between those of the traditional starting pitcher and the closer. In the opener strategy, a relief pitcher starts the game and pitches the first one or two innings (when guaranteed to face the top hitters in the opponent's lineup) before giving way to a long reliever to work the middle innings of the game. On some occasions, teams would use multiple relievers who could pitch only one or two innings after the opener; this became known as a bullpen game. Due to their lighter workload and conditioning, openers are able to pitch more frequently than a traditional starter.

In the early decades of baseball, it was not uncommon for a starting pitcher to pitch 300 innings or more, over the course of a season. In addition, there are accounts of starting pitchers pitching on consecutive days, or even in both games of a doubleheader. It is believed that these feats were only possible because pitchers in the early years of the game, unlike modern starters, rarely threw the ball with maximum effort.

A starting pitcher who can be counted on to consistently throw many innings is known as a workhorse. An example of a modern-day workhorse pitcher was Roy Halladay, who was the active leader in both complete games thrown and shutouts before his retirement in 2013.

A pitcher that normally isn't a regular member of a team's starting rotation that situationally starts a game is commonly referred to as a "spot starter." Pitchers that make spot starts are often relief pitchers mainly long-relief pitchers out of the bullpen that are tasked to pitch multiple innings or a starting pitcher that is promoted from a club's minor league team to make sporadic starts. Spot starts typically occur because of emergency instances like a sudden injury to a scheduled starting pitcher in the rotation, or if there are multiple doubleheaders requiring a tight workload.

== Statistics ==
A starting pitcher must complete five innings of work in order to qualify for a "win" in a game he starts. Under NCAA baseball rules, which govern intercollegiate baseball, a starting pitcher who pitches fewer than five innings can still earn a win if he pitches for a certain amount of time that is determined before the start of the game. It is possible to be credited with a loss despite pitching fewer than five innings. A starter who works six or more innings while giving up three or fewer earned runs is said to have achieved a "quality start". A starter who finishes a game without having to be relieved by the bullpen is said to have thrown a "complete game" which is almost always a win ("Never change a winning team").

== Pitch selection ==
Starting pitchers usually have a variety of pitches to choose from, broken into a number of categories.

- Fastballs: A pitch thrown hard (anywhere from the upper 80s to over 100 mph) and which generally follows a mostly straight trajectory. There are a number of different types of fastballs. The four-seam fastball is the hardest thrown pitch, but also has very little movement or break to it. The two-seam fastball is slightly slower than the four-seam fastball (generally in the mid 80s to low 90s), but breaks slightly inward to the pitcher's throwing arm as well as dropping slightly (i.e., a left-handed pitcher throwing a two-seam fastball will have it tail slightly right-to-left). The movement and velocity of the sinker is similar to that of the two-seamer, though sinkers tend to break earlier than two-seamers. The cut fastball (cutter) is similar to the two-seam fastball in velocity, but breaks to the opposite side of a pitcher's throwing arm (i.e., a right-handed pitcher will have it break right-to-left).
- Hard breaking balls: The most prominent of the hard breaking balls is the slider. A slider is a pitch that breaks sharply in the direction of the pitcher's arm travel (left to right for a left-handed pitcher). It travels slower than a fastball (usually in the 80s), but faster than the slower breaking balls. The other hard breaking ball, the split-finger fastball (splitter), mimics the fastball. The splitter breaks late in its flight path and downwards from the point of release, with a little bit of tailing action. The split-finger is usually thrown in the low to upper 80s, although some travel upwards of 90 mph.
- Soft breaking balls: The most common soft breaking ball is the eponymous curveball. The curve breaks in the direction of the pitcher's arm travel from the point of release on through the entire arc of its flight. If one were to look at a clock, a straight drop curveball would be 12–6. A right hander with slightly more lateral break will have a curveball breaking in a 1–7 manner or with more lateral movement in a 2–8 manner. A left hander that throws a curveball with more lateral break will either have an 11–5 or 10–4 curveball. Curveballs travel from the low 60s to mid 80s in speed. The other soft breaking ball is the screwball, which is essentially a reverse curveball, as it breaks in the opposite direction of the pitcher's arm travel. The screwball is a fairly rare pitch in modern baseball, due in part to a widespread belief that it causes damage to the arm. However, a 2014 New York Times investigation concluded that this belief is unfounded, and that the screwball causes no more injury than any other pitch.
- Other off-speed pitches: Two other major off-speed pitches are used by pitchers today, one far more so than others. The changeup, which has variants such as the circle changeup, the vulcan changeup or the palmball, is a slow pitch that is thrown with the same arm motion and arm velocity of a fastball, but with a much different grip that keeps the ball from achieving the same speed; usually the changeup is 10–20 mph slower than the pitcher's fastballs. This visual distortion from a fast arm swing and a slower pitch is used to disrupt the hitter's timing. The other major off-speed pitch is the knuckleball. The knuckleball is a very difficult pitch to master, both for the pitcher (due to its unique grip and delivery manner) and for his catcher (due to the pitch being thoroughly unpredictable in its travel).

== See also ==
- Setup man
- Middle reliever
- Closer
- Left-handed specialist
- Long reliever
- List of World Series starting pitchers
