= Pitch (baseball) =

The throw of a baseball from the pitcher to a batter at home plate

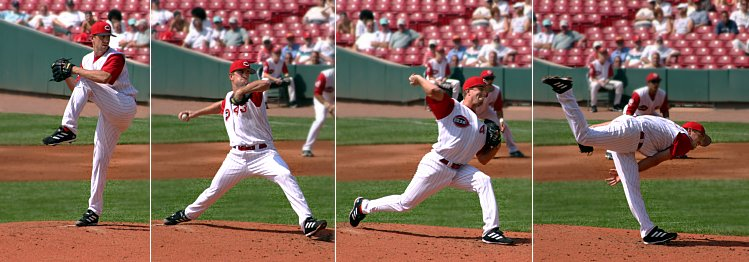
The typical motion of a pitcher.

In baseball, a pitch is the throwing of a baseball from the pitcher to a batter at home plate. The term comes from the Knickerbocker Rules. Originally, the ball had to be thrown underhand, much like pitching in horseshoes. Overhand pitching was not allowed in baseball until 1884.

The biomechanics of pitching have been studied extensively. The phases of pitching include the windup, early cocking, late cocking, early acceleration, late acceleration, deceleration, and follow-through.

Pitchers throw a variety of pitches, the easiest and most common pitch being the four-seam fastball. Each type has a slightly different velocity, trajectory, movement, hand position, wrist position and/or arm angle. These variations are intended to confuse the batter and ultimately aid the defensive team in getting the batter or baserunners out. To obtain variety and enhance defensive strategy, the pitcher manipulates the grip on the ball at the point of release. Variations in the grip cause the seams to catch the air differently, changing the trajectory of the ball and making it harder for the batter to hit.

The choice of pitch can depend on the type of hitter, whether there are any base runners, how many outs have been made in the inning, and the existing score. If a pitcher bounces a pitch in the dirt before it reaches the batter, it is ruled a ball even if it passes through the strike zone.

== Signaling ==
Traditionally, the catcher is responsible for selecting the type and location of a pitch, using fingers to give hand signals to the pitcher, with one finger usually signaling a fastball or the pitcher's best pitch. The pitcher has the option to ask for another selection by shaking his head.

Alternatively, a manager or a coach can relay the pitch selection to the catcher via secret hand signals.

In 2022, Major League Baseball adopted the PitchCom wireless communication system, where catchers send signals via keypad to a receiver that speak the instructions to the pitcher and other players on the team. This system was adopted following a sign stealing scandal. The KBO League began using PitchCom in 2024.

== Types ==
According to MLB there are 4 types of pitches: fastball, changeup, breaking, and knuckleball.

=== Fastballs ===
The fastball is the most common pitch in baseball, and most pitchers have some form of a fastball in their arsenal. Most pitchers throw four-seam fastballs. It is basically a pitch thrown very fast, generally as hard as a given pitcher can throw while maintaining control. Some variations involve movement or breaking action, while others do not and are simply straight, high-speed pitches.

While throwing the fastball, it is very important to have proper mechanics, which will increase the chance of getting the ball to its highest velocity, making it difficult for the opposing player to hit the pitch. The cut fastball, split-finger fastball, and forkball are variations on the fastball with extra movement, and are sometimes called sinking fastballs because of the trajectories. The most common types of fastballs are:

- Cutter
- Four-seam fastball
- Sinker
- Two-seam fastball
- Gyroball
- Shuuto

=== Offspeed ===
==== Breaking balls ====
A common grip of a slider

Well-thrown breaking balls have movement, usually sideways or downward. A ball moves due to the changes in the pressure of the air surrounding the ball as a result of the kind of pitch thrown. Therefore, the ball keeps moving in the path of least resistance, which constantly changes.

For example, the spin from a properly thrown slider, thrown by a right-handed pitcher, results in lower air pressure on the pitcher's left side, resulting in the ball moving to the left, from the pitcher's perspective. The goal is usually to make the ball difficult to hit by confusing the batters. Most breaking balls are considered off-speed pitches. The most common breaking pitches are:

- Curveball
  - 12–6 curveball
  - Knuckle curve
- Screwball
- Slider
- Slurve

==== Changeup ====
Offspeed pitches are usually thrown to look like a fastball, but arrive much slower to the plate. Its reduced speed coupled with its deceptive delivery is meant to confuse the batter's timing. Typically, it is thrown with the same pitching motion as a fastball but further back in the hand, which makes it release from the hand slower while retaining the appearance of a fastball. A changeup is generally thrown 8–15 miles per hour (13–24 km per hour) slower than a fastball.

If thrown correctly, an offspeed pitch will confuse the batter, because the human eye cannot discern that the ball is coming significantly slower until it is around 30 feet from the plate. For example, a batter swings at the ball as if it was a 90 mph (140 km/h) fastball, but it is coming at 75 mph (121 km/h) which means he is swinging too early to hit the ball well. The most common offspeed pitches are:

- Circle changeup
- Forkball
  - Split-finger fastball
- Fosh
- Palmball
- Straight changeup
- Vulcan changeup

==== Junk pitches ====
- Eephus pitch
- Knuckleball

== Illegal pitches ==
- Beanball
- Emery ball
- Shine ball
- Spitball

== Purpose pitches ==
- Brushback pitch
- Pickoff
- Pitchout

== Pitching deliveries ==
A Pitch being thrown

The most common pitching delivery is the three-quarters delivery. Other deliveries include the submarine (underhand) and the sidearm deliveries. There is also the crossfire pitch, which only works for sidearm delivery.

A pickoff move is the motion the pitcher goes through in making pickoff.

== Pitching positions ==
There are two legal pitching positions:

- the windup
- the set which is often referred to as the stretch.

Typically, pitchers from the set use a high leg kick, but may instead release the ball more quickly by using the slide step.

== See also ==
- Biomechanics of Baseball Pitching
- First-pitch strike
- Bowling, the equivalent in cricket
  - Throwing (cricket), an illegal action in cricket similar to baseball pitching
- Pitch (softball)
