= Joseph McElroy Mann =

American baseball player (born 1856)

Joseph McElroy "Mac" Mann
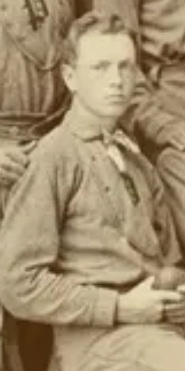
- Mann in 1874

Princeton University Tigers
- Pitcher, Infield
- Born: July 13, 1856; New York City, New York, U.S.
- Died: November 17, 1919 (aged 63)

Joseph McElroy "Mac" Mann (July 13, 1856 – November 17, 1919) was an American collegiate baseball player for Princeton University in Princeton, New Jersey then known as the College of New Jersey. He is widely credited as the first college baseball player to master throwing a curveball and the first to throw a no-hitter.

== Early life ==
Mann was born in New York City on July 13, 1856 to the Rev. Joseph Rich Mann and the former Ellen Thomson.

== Baseball ==
=== Curveball ===
John Thorn, The official baseball historian for Major League Baseball, credits Mann as being the first college baseball player to master throwing a curveball. “In order to save my sore finger, I let the ball go out of my hand differently from my usual manner,” Mann later recalled. He turned to M.W. Jacobus, ’77, who was playing shortstop and said: “Here goes for three strikes.” Sure enough the batter struck out. Then Mann said, “Those balls curved.”

Around 1872, James Winthrop Hageman, an 1872 Princeton University graduate, attained recognition as a curve ball pitcher. Several hitters attributing their contact difficulties to his effective use of curve pitching. Joseph "Mac" Mann conducted a scientific study into the mechanics of pitching the curveball. He studied the factors to the break in the curveball rather than focusing on the technique itself. Mann practiced throwing the curveball the entire winter of 1875 in the Princeton gymnasium. He pitched the outshoot curve most effectively, but could also pitch the in-shoot curve and the drop curve as well. “Mac” Mann did not invent the curving of a ball as curveballs had previously been thrown for seemingly as long as baseball has been a sport. However, Mann demonstrate the effectiveness of the curveball and revolutionized the manner of delivery of the pitch.

Professional baseball players including John Radcliffe, Bill Boyd, Chick Fulmer, Billy Barnie and Bob Ferguson, studied Mann and his curveball. In his 1900 autobiography A Ball Player’s Career, Cap Anson credited Mann as being one of the early curveball pitchers. A New York Times story about Anson’s book sparked a brief debate about who had been the first collegiate curveball pitcher, Mann or his Yale rival Charles Hammond “Ham” Avery. Alumni from each school presented evidence. Three letters to the editor appeared in The New York Times on June 10, 1900, crediting Mann as the first to regularly throw the pitch in college baseball.

=== No-hitter ===
On May 29, 1875, in a game against Yale at Hamilton Park in New Haven, Connecticut, Mann used the curveball to throw nine innings without allowing a single hit to stymie Yale, 3–0, in what is believed to be the first recorded no-hitter, either amateur or professional. Two Princeton errors kept Mann from earning the game's first perfect game. By the time Mann graduated in 1876 he had pretty much blown out his arm.

== Shot-put ==
In 1876, Mann graduated from Princeton. He set the shot-put world-record, at the time, 9.44 meters (31 feet). On July 20, 1876, he won the shot-put competition at the first-ever championship meet of the Intercollegiate Association of Amateur Athletes of America, held in Saratoga Springs, New York.

== Later life ==
After completing his studies at Princeton University, Mann worked at the New York World until 1883. He was with the Presbyterian Board of Foreign Missions for three years before working over thirty years at the publisher Charles Scribner's Sons in Manhattan, New York. Mann also served as a member of the Board of Trustees for the American Christian Hospital in Caesarea, Israel.

In 1883, he married Fannie Benedict Carter. They have two sons who are Princeton University graduates and entered the legal profession. Mann died on November 17, 1919, approximately two years after the death of his wife.
