= Biomechanics of baseball pitching =

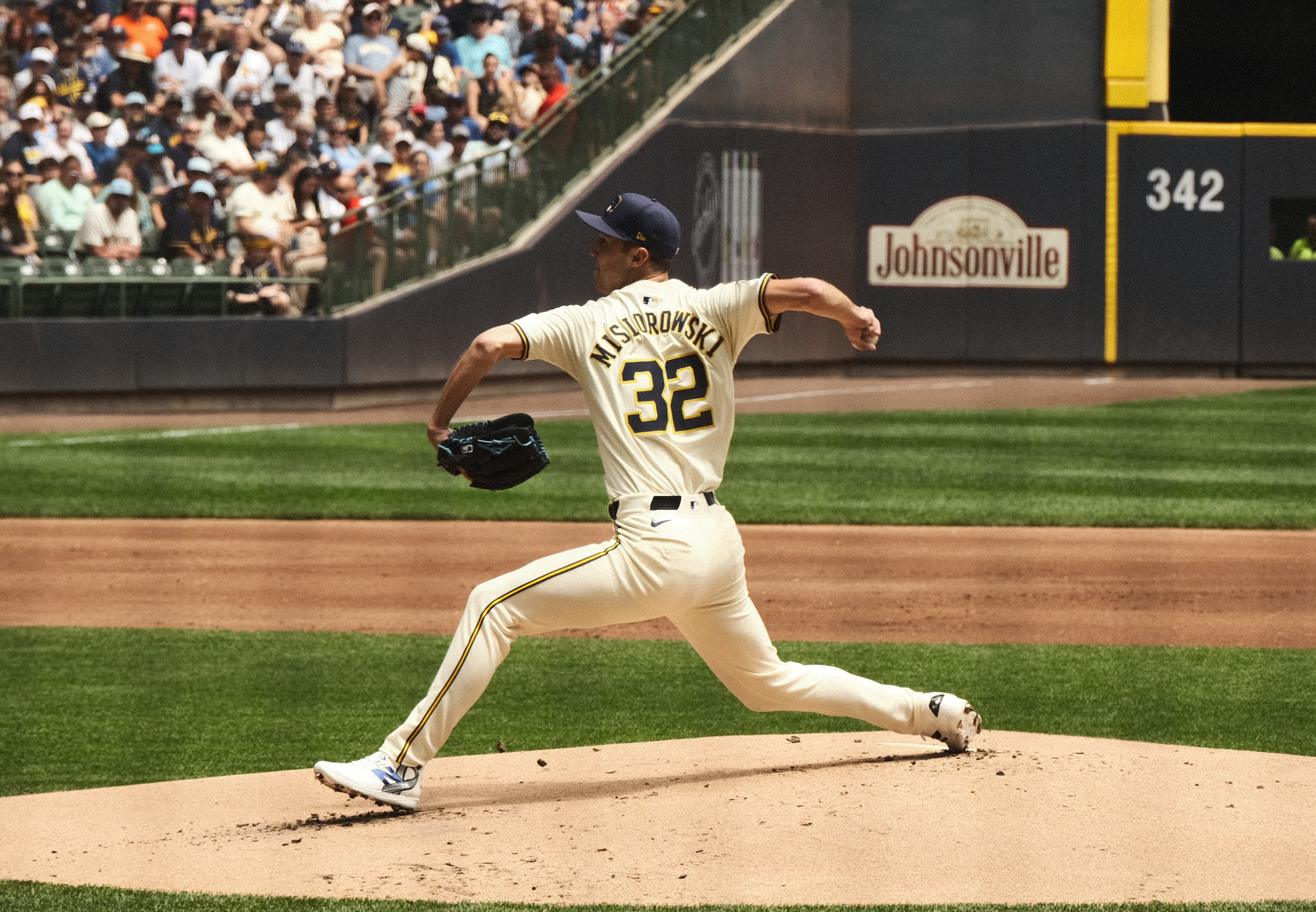
Jacob Misiorowski, a major league pitcher, delivering a pitch from the mound during a professional baseball game

Baseball pitching involves coordinated mechanical and physiological processes that propel a baseball from the pitcher's mound toward home plate.

The lower body, trunk and upper limbs work together through a coordinated kinetic chain to generate and transfer energy to the baseball. Biomechanics of baseball pitching is a branch of sports biomechanics.

The pitch is commonly divided in six phases: windup, stride, arm cocking, arm acceleration, arm deceleration, and follow-through.

Pitching biomechanics are studied using three-dimensional motion capture, wearable sensors, force plates, and machine learning methods. The study of the biomechanics of baseball pitching informs mechanical instruction, workload management, return-to-play decisions, and performance optimization.

== Kinetic chain ==
The kinetic chain in baseball pitching is the sequential transfer of mechanical energy through the body during the overhand throwing motion. This process begins with the lower limbs generating force, which is transmitted through the hips and trunk to the shoulder and arm, ultimately propelling the ball towards the plate. Deviations from segment coordination can overload joints, which is associated with injury risk.

Tim Peterson delivering a baseball pitch, illustrating the sequential transfer of energy through the kinetic chain

=== Lower body ===
Legs produce the primary propulsive forces that initiate the pitching motion, generating ground reaction forces that are transferred up the body. The drive (trail) leg pushes off the pitching rubber to create forward momentum, while the lead (stride) leg absorbs impact and stabilizes the pelvis on stride foot contact. Hip and lower-body rotation contribute to the transfer of energy into the trunk and upper extremities. The legs and trunk are the primary force generators during the pitch.

=== Trunk and core ===
During pitching, trunk rotation contributes substantially to the generation of angular momentum and mechanical power, which are transferred through the kinetic chain to accelerate the throwing arm. Energy generated through trunk rotation is transferred to the upper arm and forearm for ball acceleration. The timing of trunk rotation relative to stride affects how efficiently energy is transmitted through the kinetic chain.

=== Upper body ===
Energy transmitted by the trunk is transferred to the shoulder complex and scapula, which position the glenohumeral joint for maximum rotation prior to arm acceleration. The shoulder muscles contribute to joint positioning, stability, and efficient transfer of forces during the throwing motion, but are not the primary force generators during the pitch. The elbow, forearm, and wrist make up segments of the pitching kinetic chain. As the arm accelerates, energy progresses through coordinated elbow extension, forearm pronation/supination, and wrist flexion, which contribute to the transfer of force toward the baseball before release.

=== Coordination ===
Effective energy transfer through the kinetic chain depends on precise intersegmental timing. Common biomechanical indicators of kinetic-chain efficiency are hip-shoulder separation angle and trunk angular velocity; these metrics are used to compare pitchers and to relate pitching biomechanics to pitch velocity and injury risk.

== Pitching phases ==
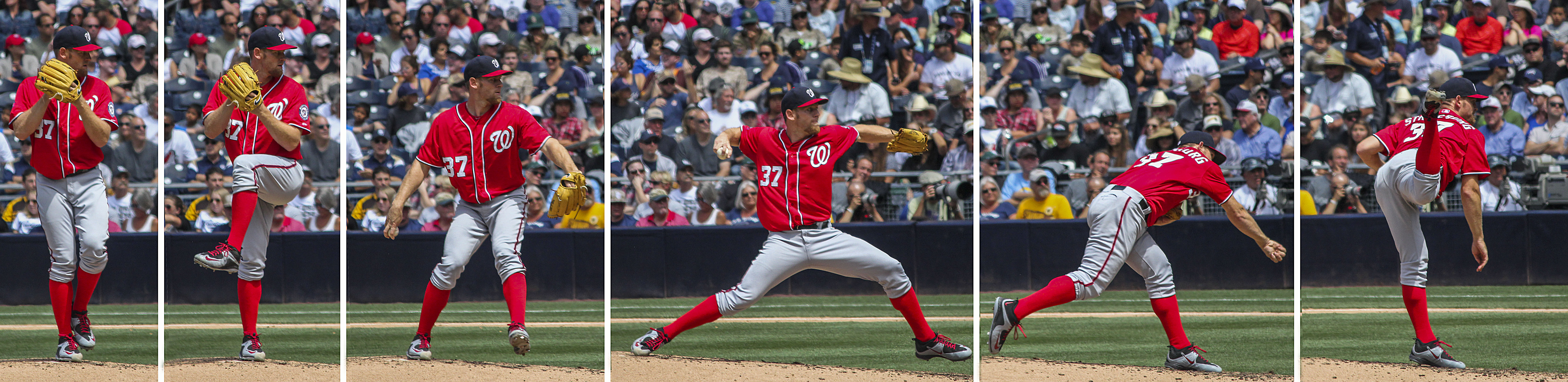
Stephen Strasburg, a major league pitcher, photographed sequentially throughout the six pitching phases

There are six phases of the pitching motion in baseball: windup, stride, arm cocking, arm acceleration, arm deceleration, and follow-through.

Phase	Begins	Ends	Primary biomechanical function
Windup	Lead leg lift	Maximum lead-knee height	Establishes balance and prepares the body to generate energy for the throw
Stride	Maximum lead-knee height	Stride foot contact	Transfers energy from the lower body into forward motion and positions the trunk and arm for rotation
Arm cocking	Stride foot contact	When the arm is turned fully backward	Transfers energy from the trunk to the shoulder while positioning the arm for acceleration
Arm acceleration	When the arm is turned fully backward	Ball release	Accelerates the ball through rapid shoulder internal rotation and elbow extension
Arm deceleration	Ball release	When the arm is turned fully inward	Slows the arm and dissipates forces through eccentric muscle activity
Follow-through	When the arm is turned fully inward	End of arm motion	Completes deceleration of the arm and restores balance following the pitch

=== Windup ===
The windup is the initial phase of the pitching motion, used to position the body to generate energy for the throw. The windup phase begins as the pitcher lifts the lead leg with the hands held at the chest and ends when the lead knee reaches its maximum height. The lower body stabilizes the body over the drive leg during the windup to maximize force generation once forward movement begins. The torso rotates away from the throwing direction, storing energy for later phases.

=== Stride ===
The stride phase transfers energy from the lower body into forward motion and positions the trunk and arm for rotation. It begins at peak leg lift and ends at stride foot contact. The drive leg generates forward momentum, while the lead leg provides support and absorbs landing forces. The trunk remains rotated away from the target, maintaining stored elastic energy. Timing of trunk and shoulder rotation influences pitch velocity and injury risk.

=== Arm cocking ===
The arm cocking phase transfers energy from the trunk to the shoulder as the torso rotates toward the target. It starts at stride foot contact and ends when the upper arm is turned as far backward as possible, called maximum external rotation. Lower body stabilization continues while rotational energy is transmitted through the trunk to the throwing arm. Shoulder muscles become highly active to position the glenohumeral joint for acceleration. Improper sequencing has been associated with increased shoulder and elbow loading, which can lead to injury.

=== Arm acceleration ===
Arm acceleration begins at maximum shoulder external rotation and ends at ball release. The shoulder undergoes rapid internal rotation, with angular velocities reaching 7,500° per second. The rapid rotation of the shoulder during the pitch is the fastest recorded human joint motion. Elbow extension occurs concurrently, causing high joint torques. The arm acceleration phase includes the highest quantities of force and torque on the shoulder and elbow during the pitch.

=== Arm deceleration ===
Arm deceleration begins at ball release and ends at maximum shoulder internal rotation. The purpose of the arm deceleration phase is to decelerate the arm safely and smoothly. Eccentric contraction of the rotator cuff slows arm motion. The muscles of the shoulders, upper arm, chest, and upper back operate under high mechanical demand during this phase to decelerate the limb.

=== Follow-through ===
The follow-through begins at maximum shoulder internal rotation and continues until the pitching arm is no longer in motion. During the follow-through, less muscles are firing than previous stages. Eccentric contraction of the posterior shoulder muscles helps slow arm motion and control joint forces during this phase. During the follow-through, scapular stabilizers maintain shoulder stability. Biceps reach peak activation in the follow-through in order to fully decelerate the arm. Proper completion of the follow-through is necessary in order for the pitcher to field a batted ball after the pitch.

== Applications ==
=== Injury prevention ===
Biomechanical research has been used to identify pitching characteristics associated with increased stress on the throwing elbow and shoulder, informing recommendations intended to reduce injury risk in pitchers. These recommendations include guidance that pitchers learn proper mechanics early in their development, an approach intended to both reduce injury risk and improve performance. Biomechanical research has also linked pitching volume and insufficient rest to a higher risk of arm injury, which has informed clinical guidance on limiting how much pitchers throw. Overuse of the throwing motion has similarly been identified as a contributor to injury among throwing athletes more broadly, not only in baseball. In addition, biomechanics research has found shoulder stiffness increases as a person applies more muscle torque. Shoulder stiffness contributes to pitching injuries by altering the natural biomechanics of the throwing motion.

Clinical interest in preventing throwing-related injuries has led to increased attention on evaluating and training the entire body, not just the arm, as part of injury-prevention efforts. Weakness in the lower extremities and trunk can disrupt the transfer of force through the kinetic chain, increasing the demands placed on the shoulder and elbow during pitching. Fixing lower-body and trunk impairments can help prevent injury by improving kinetic-chain function and reducing loading on the shoulder and elbow during the pitch.

Workload management is the tracking and regulation of a pitcher's throwing volume over time. Workload management is used to guide decisions about rest and pitching volume, since a higher pitching workload has been linked to increased injury risk. Workload monitoring is also used as one component of structured protocols for managing a pitcher's return to throwing after injury, alongside other criteria such as range of motion and strength.

=== Rehabilitation ===
Biomechanical analysis is used in the rehabilitation of pitchers recovering from throwing-related injury. Biomechanical analysis is used to design exercises intended to address the physical demands of pitching. Clinical evaluation of the entire body, rather than the throwing arm alone, is also part of the treatment of injured pitchers. Biomechanical analysis is used to gauge a throwing athlete's readiness to return to competition following injury, using biomechanical indicators as part of the evaluation process.

=== Performance optimization ===
Pitchers optimize the biomechanics of their pitching motion to pitch more effectively and more efficiently. Biomechanical analysis is used to improve pitching performance by identifying mechanical flaws that limit efficiency and consistency. Coaches apply biomechanical findings to determine how effectively an individual pitcher transfers energy through the body to produce desired outcomes such as high pitch velocity or consistent pitch accuracy. Pitchers benefit from biomechanical findings by gaining insights into biomechanical factors associated with pitch velocity and injury risk.

In Major League Baseball (MLB), biomechanical analysis has become integrated into player development systems to optimize performance at the professional level. MLB teams have incorporated pitching laboratories and performance departments that combine biomechanical evaluations with other forms of player data to help refine mechanics and monitor changes throughout a player's development. These systems are used throughout MLB organizations to support areas such as pitching performance development and scouting.

== Biomechanical analysis methods ==
=== Video motion capture ===
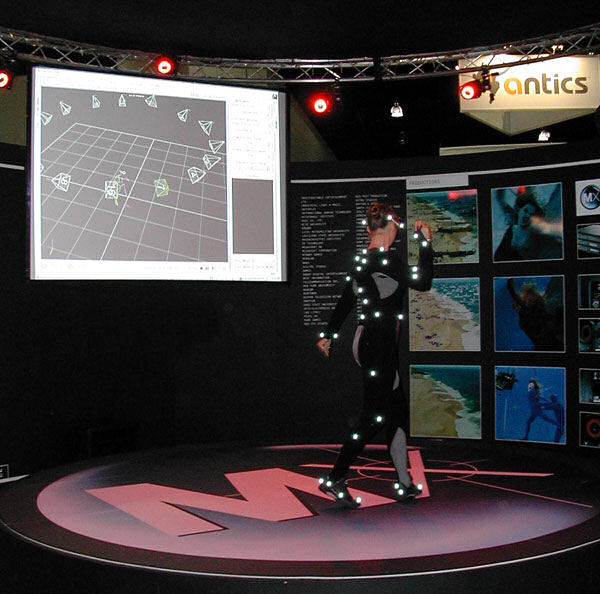
Marker-based three-dimensional motion capture laboratory used for biomechanical analysis of human movement

Pitching biomechanics has most often been studied using marker-based three-dimensional video motion capture, which in 2022 was described as the gold standard for biomechanical analysis of the throwing athlete. Marker-based three-dimensional motion capture uses near-infrared camera arrays to track the pitcher's motion. Video motion capture is time-consuming to set up and calibrate. Marker-based testing requires controlled laboratory conditions, with high-speed cameras set in fixed positions around the subject and the arm tracked using navigational markers attached to the pitcher.

Pitching mechanics have also been examined with markerless motion capture systems, which estimate body position from video without requiring markers placed on the subject. Commercial camera systems such as Hawk-Eye and KinaTrax have been used to measure pitching mechanics during major league games. These systems track variables including release point, ball spin, and ball trajectory. Comparative analyses demonstrate that markerless and marker-based motion capture technologies record equivalent kinematic patterns during the baseball pitching motion.

=== Wearable sensors ===
Wearable inertial measurement units, which contain accelerometers and gyroscopes, have been used as an alternative to video motion capture. The sensors on these units record and measure acceleration and angular velocity. Wearable sensors have demonstrated good-to-excellent reliability across repeated measurements, although measurements of arm slot, arm stress, and shoulder rotation differ significantly from those obtained using marker-based motion capture systems.

=== Force measurements ===
Ground-reaction forces during pitching have been measured with force plates embedded in or beneath an instrumented pitching mound. In some setups, two force plates are used to record the drive leg and lead leg separately, allowing measurement of variables such as peak anterior push-off force and vertical force at stride-foot contact. Force-plate data are often synchronized with motion capture or high-speed video to relate ground-reaction forces to the timing of different phases of the pitching motion.

=== Machine learning ===
Machine learning methods are used in baseball pitching biomechanics to classify pitch type from wearable sensor data. Inputs include pelvis and trunk peak angular velocity and the time between their peaks. This data is used in machine learning models to classify pitches as fastballs, curveballs, or change-ups, or as fastball versus non-fastball.

== See also ==
- Pitch (baseball)
- Tommy John Surgery
