= Overhand =

Overhand may refer to:

- Overhand (boxing), a looping punch
- Overhand knot
- Overhand throwing motion
- Overhand grip
