= Middle reliever =

Pitching role in baseball

In baseball, a middle reliever, or middle relief pitcher, is a relief pitcher who typically pitches during the fifth, sixth, and seventh innings of a standard baseball game. In leagues with no designated hitter, such as in the National League before 2022 and the Japanese Central League, a middle reliever often comes in after the starting pitcher has been pulled in favor of a pinch hitter. Middle-relief pitchers are usually tasked to pitch one, two, or three innings. Several factors determine this, such as who’s winning, the score, eligible bullpen pitchers remaining, the importance of the current game, etc. After the middle relief pitcher has completed his portion, they are normally replaced in later innings by a left/right-handed specialist, setup pitcher, and/or lastly a closer. When they’re replaced, it is partly due to deprivation of stamina and/or effectiveness but also characteristics, such as pitch arsenal, speed of pitches, which arm they throw with, and who’s up to bat next for the opposing team. Middle relievers may pitch in these later innings, especially during games tied or close in score.

== Notable middle relievers ==
A 2015 ESPN article written by David Schoenfield ranked the 10 greatest middle relievers of all time by wins above replacement, with the criteria of having pitched 80% of career games in relief and having fewer than 50 saves at the time of publication. Names mentioned include Larry Andersen, Joaquin Benoit, Arthur Rhodes, Paul Quantrill and Mark Eichhorn; also mentioned was Kent Tekulve, who did not qualify due to having 184 career saves.
