= Changeup =

Baseball and softball pitch

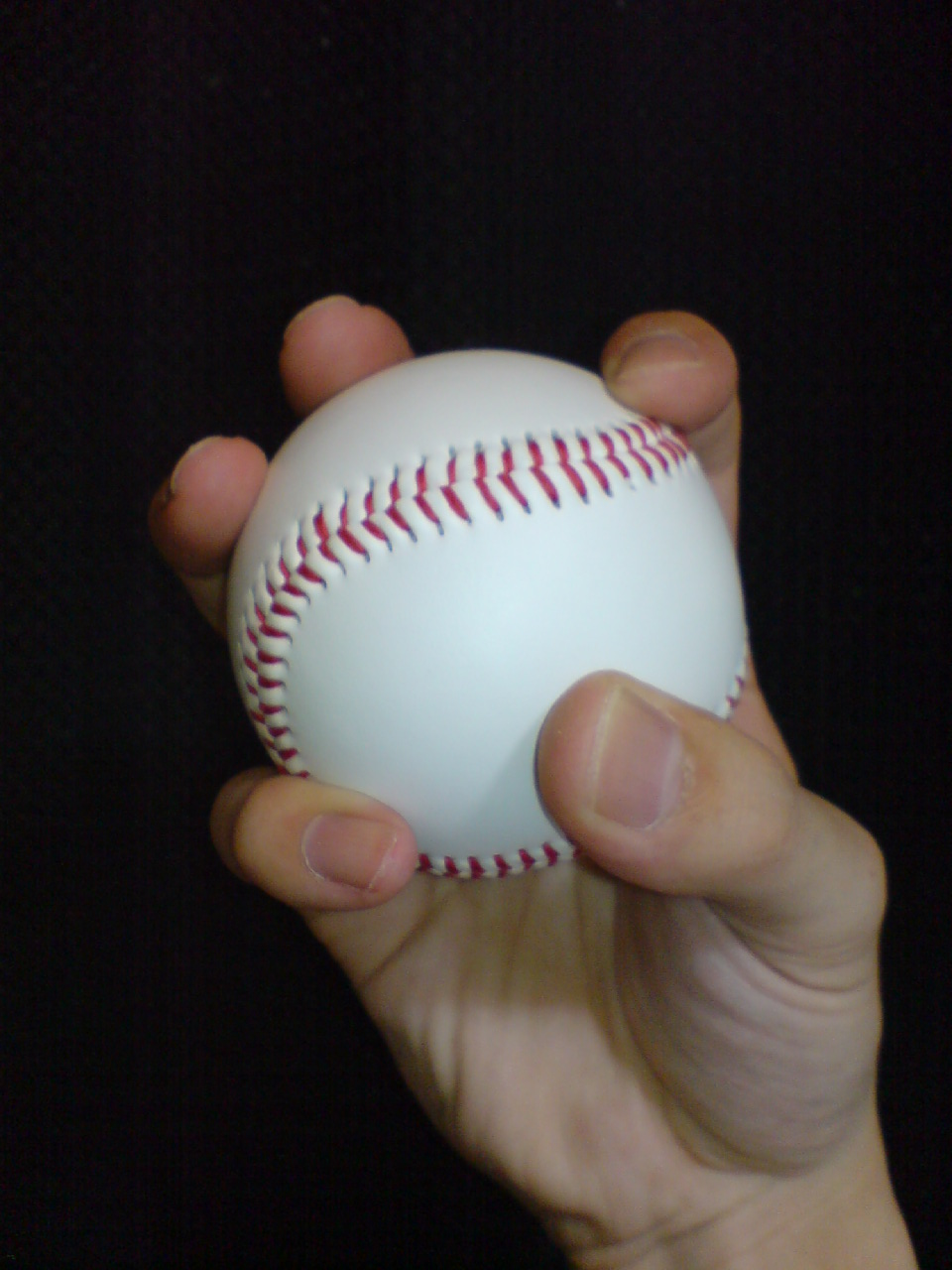
The grip used for a changeup

A changeup is a type of pitch in baseball and fastpitch softball.

The changeup is a staple off-speed pitch usually thrown to look like a fastball but arriving much more slowly to the plate. Its reduced speed coupled with its deceptive delivery is meant to confuse the batter's timing. It is meant to be thrown with the same biomechanics as a fastball, but further back in the hand, which makes it release from the hand slower while still retaining the look of a fastball.

A changeup is generally thrown to be 8–15 miles per hour (13–24 km/h) slower than a fastball. If thrown correctly, the changeup will confuse the batter because the human eye cannot discern that the ball is coming significantly slower until it is around 30 feet (9.1 m) from the plate. For example, a batter swings at the oncoming ball as if it were a 94 mph (151 km/h) fastball, but instead the ball is coming in at 89 mph (143 km/h), so they swing too early to hit the ball well (also known as being "out in front").

Other names include a change-of-pace or a change. In addition, before at least the second half of the 20th century, the term "slow ball" was used to denote pitches that were not a fastball or breaking ball, which almost always meant a type of changeup. Therefore, the terms slow ball and changeup could be used interchangeably. The changeup is usually, but not always, pitched faster than a curveball and at about the same speed as a slider.

The changeup is analogous to the slower ball in cricket.

== Delivery ==
The changeup is thrown with the same mechanics as a fastball, but at a lower speed due to the pitcher holding the ball in a special grip. Former pitcher and pitching coach Leo Mazzone stated:

When a pitcher throws his best fastball, he puts more in it; the changeup is such that one throws something other than his best fastball. By having this mindset, the pitch will have less velocity on it in addition to the change in grips. This difference from what is expected by the arm action and the velocity can confuse the batter into swinging the bat far too early and thus receiving a strike, or not swinging at all. Should a batter be fooled on the timing of the pitch and still make contact, it will cause a foul ball or the ball being put into play weakly, usually resulting in an out. In addition to the unexpectedly slow velocity, the changeup can also [sic] possess a significant amount of movement, which can bewilder the batter even further. The very best changeups utilize both deception and movement.

== Popularity ==
Since the rise of Pedro Martínez, a Dominican pitcher whose changeup was one of the tools that led to his three Cy Young Awards, the changeup has become increasingly popular in the Dominican Republic. Dominican pitchers including Edinson Vólquez, Michael Ynoa, and Ervin Santana are all known to have developed effective changeups in the Dominican Republic after Martínez's success with the pitch.

As a notable changeup thrower of the last 30 years, Atlanta Braves southpaw Tom Glavine utilized a two-seam changeup as his number one pitch on the way to winning two Cy Young Awards, a World Series MVP, and 305 wins in a Hall of Fame career.

Hall of Famer reliever Trevor Hoffman had one of the best changeups in his prime and used it to record 601 saves.

In the 2010s, some of the game's best pitchers came to rely heavily on the changeup. A 2013 article published by Sports Illustrated noted that star starting pitchers Justin Verlander, Félix Hernández, Stephen Strasburg, David Price, and Max Scherzer revolutionized the pitch and used it abundantly in their arsenal. In addition to its effectiveness on the field, according to Fox Sports changeups may also reduce the number of injuries suffered by a pitcher.

One of Devin Williams' two primary pitches is a circle changeup with screwball-like movement while rotating the ball off the ring finger during release, which is also similar to a cricket leg-spinner bowling a googly, but at a much faster pace of around 85 mph and with a very high spin-rate of 2,852 rpm. Rob Friedman affectionately named it the "airbender".

== Variations ==
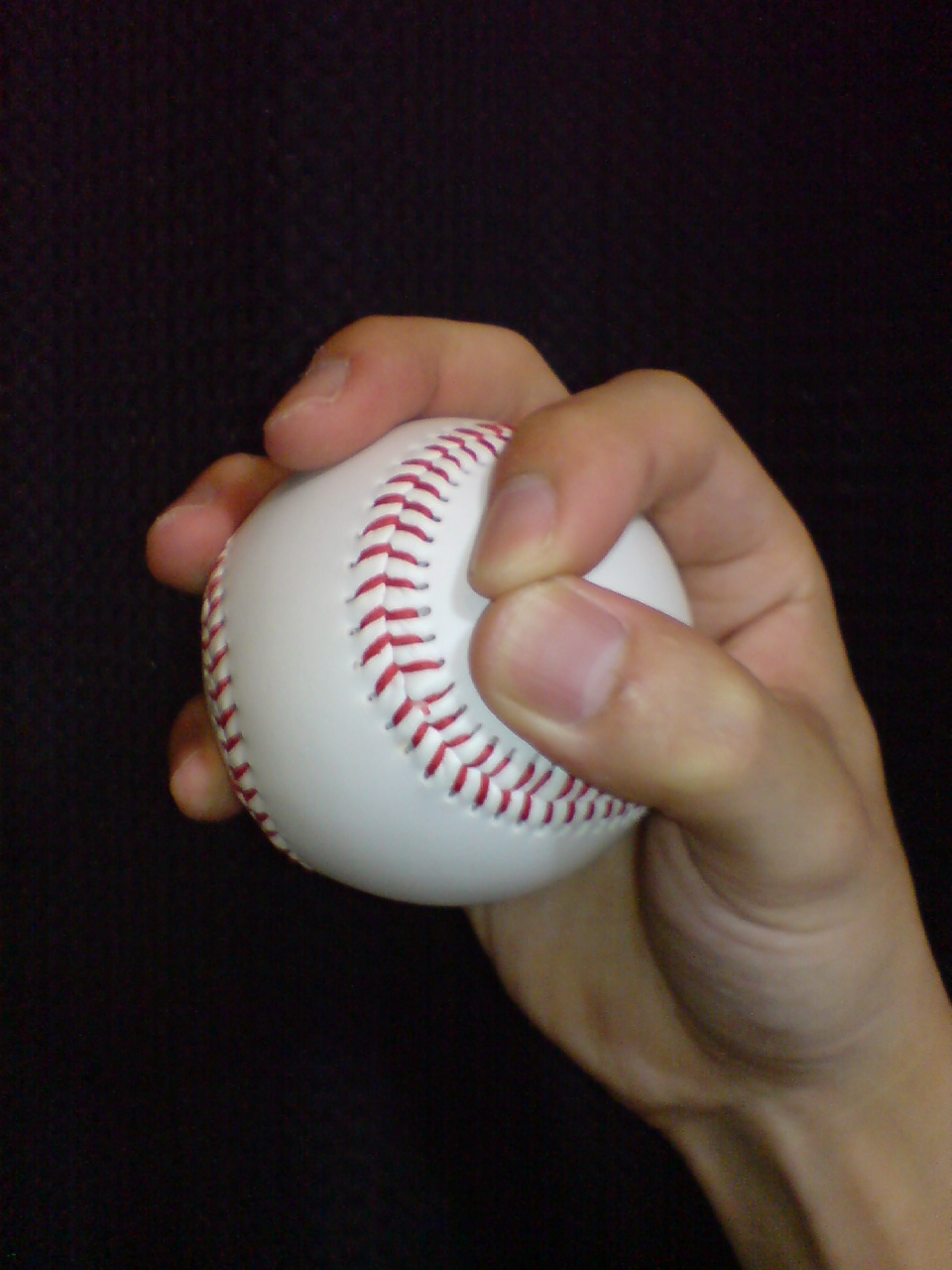
The grip used for a circle changeup.

There are several variations of changeups, which are generated by using different grips on the ball during the release of the pitch.

The circle changeup is one well-known grip. The pitcher forms a circle with the index finger and thumb and lays the middle and ring fingers across the seams of the ball. By pronating the wrist upon release, the pitcher can make the pitch break in the same direction as a screwball. More or less break will result from the pitcher's arm slot. Pedro Martínez used this pitch throughout his career to great effect, and many considered it to be his best pitch.

A far less common type of changeup is the straight changeup, thrown by a small minority of major league pitchers. The ball is held with three fingers (instead of the usual two) and closer to the palm, to kill some of the speed generated by the wrist and fingers. This pitch generally breaks downward slightly, though its motion does not differ greatly from a two-seam fastball.

Other variations include the palmball, vulcan changeup and fosh. The split-finger fastball and forkball is used by some pitchers as a type of changeup depending on its velocity.

== See also ==
- Fastball
- Curveball
- Biomechanics of Baseball Pitching
