= Slurve =

Type of baseball pitch

The slurve is a baseball pitch in which the pitcher throws a curve ball as if it were a slider. The pitch is gripped like a curve ball, but thrown with a slider velocity. The term is a portmanteau of slider and curve.

== History ==
Johnny Sain of the Boston Braves was known to throw a slurve in the 1940s. On May 6, 1998, Kerry Wood of the Chicago Cubs utilized the slurve in a major-league record-tying 20 strikeout game. Los Angeles Dodgers, Yakult Swallows, and Seibu Lions pitcher Kazuhisa Ishii, despite his well-documented control problems, used a slurve almost exclusively against left-handers. Alfredo Aceves from the Boston Red Sox was also known to throw a slurve. Stephen Strasburg claims to throw a slurve, although experts still call his pitch a curveball. Hall of Fame relief pitcher Goose Gossage stated that learning how to throw a slurve changed his career in his Yankeeography. Both Cy Young and Walter Johnson had slurves in their arsenals and the former is the earliest known user of the pitch, having started his career in 1890.

== Slurve pitchers ==
- Alfredo Aceves
- Dellin Betances
- Jose Berrios
- Dallas Braden
- Yu Darvish
- José Fernández
- Corey Kluber
- Aaron Loup
- Dámaso Marte
- Roberto Osuna
- Michael Pineda
- Jonathan Sánchez
- Drew Smyly
- Stephen Strasburg
- Julio Urias
- Kerry Wood
- Kyle Harrison
- Mike Soroka

== Concerns in pitching ==
Critics of the slurve call the pitch a sloppy slider because of its wide break. They claim that the slurve produces more home runs than a late-breaking slider. The usefulness of the slurve is debated. The slurve is also claimed to cause problems to a pitcher. In 1998, Kerry Wood claimed his elbow soreness was caused by throwing the slurve.
