= Sports biomechanics =

Quantitative study of athletes and sports

Sports biomechanics is the quantitative based study and analysis of athletes and sports activities in general. It can simply be described as the physics of sports. Within this specialized field of biomechanics, the laws of mechanics are applied in order to gain a greater understanding of athletic performance through mathematical modeling, computer simulation and measurement. Biomechanics, as a broader discipline, is the study of the structure and function of biological systems by means of the methods of mechanics (the branch of physics involving analysis of the actions of forces).Modern sports biomechanics increasingly utilizes Computer Vision and Machine Learning algorithms to provide real-time kinematic feedback to athletes during training

Within mechanics there are two sub-fields of study: statics, which is the study of systems that are in a state of constant motion either at rest (with no motion) or moving with a constant velocity; and dynamics, which is the study of systems in motion in which acceleration is present, which may involve kinematics (the study of the motion of bodies with respect to time, displacement, velocity, and speed of movement either in a straight line or in a rotary direction) and kinetics (the study of the forces associated with motion, including forces causing motion and forces resulting from motion). Sports biomechanists help people obtain optimal muscle recruitment and performance. A biomechanist also uses their knowledge to apply proper load barring techniques to preserve the body.

Human biomechanics helps analyze the body's movements, exploring how internal forces -- such as muscles, ligaments, and joints -- help create external movement. By incorporating the principles of the broad field of biomechanics with the specific discipline of human biomechanics, sports biomechanics is created. The integration of this broad field and special discipline, forms a more specialized field of biomechanics, meeting the specific demands of athletes, known as sports biomechanics. By analyzing sports biomechanics, changes can be implemented to improve and enhance sports performance, rehabilitation, and injury prevention

== Sports performance ==
Sports performance is one area that can be affected by analyzing the movements of an athlete. A sports biomechanics analyst can identify where an athlete may make errors in their movements and predict possible injury risks. Sports performance can possibly be enhanced and improved by analyzing sports biomechanics. By analyzing the mechanical movements of an athlete, identification of errors and faults can become possible. The errors or faults that can be identified could be improper technique, by comparing to elite level athletes in the same sport. The discovery of possible faults helps improve an athlete's technique and possibly decrease the amount of effort needed to execute the skill. The correction of possible biomechanical errors and/or faults results in improved athletic performance.

Preventative biomechanics is another factor that can lead to improved sports performance. Preventative biomechanics involves the integration of human biomechanical methods and medical clinical practices, with the goal of assessing and reducing the risk of musculoskeletal injuries prior to their occurrence. Preventative biomechanics are able to improve sports performance by mitigating the risk of an athlete becoming injured.

== Rehabilitation ==
Rehabilitation is another area that can be affected by the analyses of the movements of an athlete. Improved rehabilitation can be achieved by analyzing an athlete's sports biomechanics. The use of different modalities in combination with the analysis of sports biomechanics has shortened the time for rehabilitation. A notable modality that's being used during rehabilitation is resistance training. Studies indicate that resistance training has been found to contribute to the enhancement of athletes' joint mobility and stability. The application of resistance training in an athlete's rehabilitation plan has demonstrated strengthening of the muscles surrounding the affected joint and other joints helping support the injury. The results of strengthening help heal from the current injury and prevent more injuries in the future.

== Injury prevention ==
Injury prevention is yet another area that can be influenced by the analysis of an athlete's movements. The analyses of sport biomechanics also have been proven to increase injury prevention and advance injury prevention tactics. By addressing the specific points where injuries most often occur, individual biomechanics around those areas are observed and corrected, if biomechanical faults are discovered. These proactive corrections help lead to the reduction of injuries, due to the early application of preventative measures. As previously highlighted in the sports performance section, preventative sports biomechanics play a large role in injury prevention for athletes. Preventative sports biomechanics involves the combination of human biomechanical methods into medical clinical practices, with a specific emphasis on athletes. The primary goal of preventative sports biomechanics is assessing and reducing the risk of musculoskeletal injuries prior to their occurrence in athletics. By accessing an individual's preventative sports biomechanics, injury prevention increases due to early recognition of errors.

== Things related to biomechanics ==
- Food
- Engineering mechanics
- Muscle mechanics
- Motor coordination
- Kinematics
- Inverse dynamics
- Statics
- Kinetics
- Velocity
- Displacement
- Acceleration
- Moment of Inertia
- Torque
- Digital filters
- Balance (ability)

== Experimental sports biomechanics ==
Methods:

- 3D Motion capture analysis
- Force plates
- Force transducers
- Strain gauges
- Anthropometric measurements (mathematical models)
- Surface EMG (Electromyography)

== Research and applications ==
- Golf swing
- Tennis
- Gymnastics
- Track and field
- Running blades
- Swimming
- Diving
- Skiing
- Trampoline
- Rowing
- Baseball
- Baseball Pitching
- Figure Skating
- Exergaming design and evaluation
- Movement Assessment
- Olympic weightlifting
- Powerlifting

== See also ==
- Leonardo da Vinci
- Biomechanics of Sprint Running
- Biomechanics of Baseball Pitching

== Bibliography ==
- Wolfgang Baumann (1989). Grundlagen der Biomechanik. Verlag Karl Hofman. ISBN 3-7780-8141-1.
- David A. Winter (2004). Biomechanics and motor control of human movement. Wiley. ISBN 0-471-44989-X.
