= Tommy John surgery =

Surgical procedure for the elbow

Ulnar collateral ligament reconstruction
- Other names: UCL reconstruction, Tommy John surgery
- ICD-9-CM: 81.85

Ulnar collateral ligament reconstruction, also known as Tommy John surgery, is a surgical graft procedure where the ulnar collateral ligament in the medial elbow is replaced with either a tendon from elsewhere in the patient's body, or with one from a deceased donor. The procedure is common among collegiate and professional athletes in several sports, particularly in baseball. The surgery is performed to restore optimal function for repetitive elbow movements or specifically throwing mechanics, often extending the careers of professional athletes. In many athletes, the surgery is done more than once during their careers.

The procedure was devised in 1974 by orthopedic surgeon Frank Jobe, a Los Angeles Dodgers team physician who served as a special advisor to the team until his death in 2014. It is named after the first baseball player to undergo the surgery, major league pitcher Tommy John, who played in Major League Baseball (MLB) for 26 seasons. The initial operation, John's successful post-surgery career, and the relationship between the two men was the subject of a 2013 ESPN 30 for 30 documentary.

== History ==
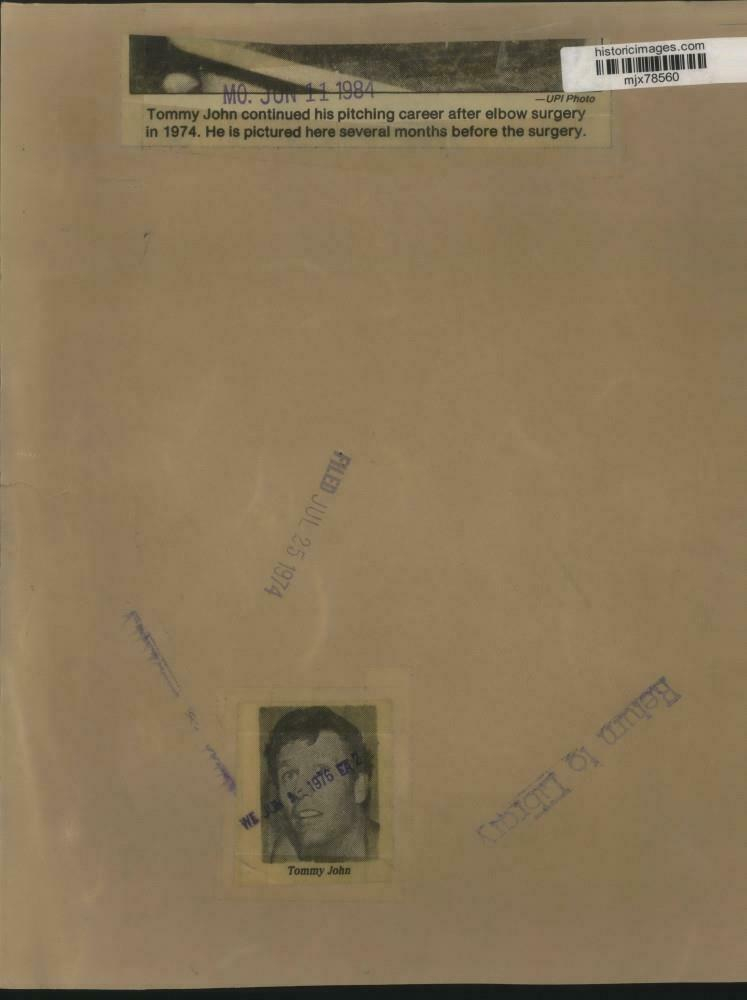
Tommy John icing his elbow in July 1974, two months before his surgery

At the time of John's operation, Jobe estimated the chance for success of the operation at one in 100. By 2009, the odds of complete recovery had risen to 85–92%.

Following his 1974 surgery, John missed the entire 1975 season rehabilitating his arm before returning for the 1976 season. Before his surgery, John had won 124 games. He won 164 games after surgery, retiring in 1989 at age 46.

For baseball players, full rehabilitation takes about 12–15 months for pitchers and about six months for position players. Players typically begin throwing about 16 weeks after surgery. While 80% of players return to pitching at the same level as before the surgery, for those Major League Baseball pitchers who receive the surgery twice, 35% never pitch again in the major leagues.

Jobe has stated that if he had invented the technique ten years earlier, it might have been nicknamed Sandy Koufax surgery, after Dodgers hall of famer Sandy Koufax, who retired with "essentially the same thing as Tommy John."

== Uses ==
The ulnar collateral ligament (UCL) can become stretched, frayed, or torn through the repetitive stress of the throwing motion. The risk of injury to the UCL is believed to be extremely high, as the amount of stress through the structure approaches its ultimate tensile strength during a hard throw.

This injury is associated with baseball, although it sometimes appears in other sports. Compared to athletes who play other sports, baseball pitchers are at elevated risk of overuse injuries and injuries caused by early sports specialization among children and teenagers.

The results of a 2002 study suggest that the total number of pitches thrown is the greatest determinant. The study examined the throwing volume, pitch type and throwing mechanics of 426 pitchers aged nine to fourteen for one year. Compared to pitchers who threw 200 or fewer pitches in a season, those who threw 201–400, 401–600, 601–800, and 800+ pitches faced an increased risk of 63%, 181%, 234%, and 161% respectively. The types of pitches thrown showed a smaller effect; throwing a slider was associated with an 86% increased chance of elbow injury while throwing a curveball was associated with an increase in pain. There was only a weak correlation between throwing mechanics perceived as bad and injury-prone.

Research into throwing injuries in young athletes has led to age-based recommendations for pitch limits.

Pitchers may require a second procedure after recovering from a first surgery. From 1999 to 2015, 39 major league pitchers had a "revision" – a second Tommy John surgery, with an average of about 5 years between the first and second surgeries. The need for a second UCL reconstruction in major league pitchers is an important factor in the duration of their contracts.

== Risks ==
There is a risk of damage to the ulnar nerve.

=== Misconceptions ===
Some baseball pitchers believe that they can throw harder after ulnar collateral ligament reconstruction than they could beforehand. As a result, orthopedic surgeons have reported that parents of young pitchers have asked them to perform the procedure on their uninjured sons in the hope that it will increase performance. However, many people, including Frank Jobe, believe that any post-surgical increases in performance are most likely the result of the increased stability of the elbow joint and pitchers' increased attention to their fitness and conditioning. Jobe believed that rather than allowing pitchers to gain speed, the surgery and rehab protocols merely allow pitchers to return to their pre-injury levels of performance.

== Technique ==
=== Reconstruction ===
A surgical incision of 3–4 inches (7.6–10.2 centimetres) is made near the elbow. Holes to accommodate a replacement graft tendon are drilled in the ulna and humerus bones of the elbow. A harvested tendon, such as the palmaris tendon from the forearm of the same or opposite elbow, the patellar tendon, hamstring, toe extensor or a donor's tendon (allograft), is then woven in a figure-eight pattern through the holes and anchored. The ulnar nerve is usually moved to prevent pain, as scar tissue can apply pressure to the nerve. The procedure is performed on an outpatient basis allowing discharge the same day, with the arm in a splint to protect the repair for the first week. After one week, a brace is employed to protect the reconstruction for about six weeks following surgery.

=== Repair ===
Repair is largely viable in cases of acute UCL avulsion type-injury at the proximal or distal end, with the main benefit of the procedure is reduced rehabilitation time compared to that of UCL reconstruction. Early attempts at UCL repair yielded poor results and were largely abandoned until anchor fixation was improved in 2008.

== Recovery ==
The rehabilitation process following surgery is typically divided into four separate phases.

1. Rehabilitation phase 1 (postoperative weeks zero to three) consists of prevention of stiffness, promotion of healing, and simultaneous protection of the reconstructed graft with a hinged elbow brace
2. The goals of phase 2 (weeks four to eight) are to gain strength and gain full range of movement
3. During phase 3 (weeks nine to 13), the rehabilitation is focused on flexibility and neuromuscular control with a progression toward sports-related activities
4. The progression to a throwing program is made during phase 4 (weeks 14 to 26) for overhead athletes

Full competition throwing is usually permitted at seven to nine months, and pitchers are ready to return to the game at approximately 10 to 18 months.

== Incidence ==
Over two decades preceding 2016, the number of UCLR surgeries increased threefold, a rate that was expected to continue to rise. A 2015 study showed that the rate of UCLR surgery for those aged 15 to 19 was the highest among all age ranges and was increasing by 9% each year.

USA Baseball, Major League Baseball, and Little League Baseball initiated the Pitch Smart program designed to lower the risk of elbow injuries in adolescent pitchers. The main risk factors for elbow injury from overhand throwing are the number of pitches per game, innings pitched per season, months pitched per year and poor pitching biomechanics that may increase torque and force on the elbow.

== Individuals Affected ==
Former Washington Nationals pitcher Stephen Strasburg is known as one of the biggest "what ifs" in major league pitching history. Strasburg holds one of the most memorable and impressive debuts as a starting pitcher, recording 14 strikeouts in seven innings; He then faced a major setback after needing Tommy John surgery. Although Strasburg faced a major setback he was still able to return as a pitcher in 2011 and was named an All Star 3 times in his career.

Tim Hudson's case of Tommy John surgery is a little different than most, Hudson was able to become a better pitcher after undergoing Tommy John surgery at an age where most fans thought he would decline. After tearing his UCL in 2008 at 32 years of age, most Atlanta Braves fans were very sceptical of Hudson's return. He was able to silence those who though negatively in his return in 2010 by having one of his best performing seasons with a 17-9 record and a 2.83 ERA which actually watched him the NL comeback player of the year and being voted 4th place for the Cy Young award.

Nathen Eovaldi is a prime example of a pitcher who was able to rebuild a highly successful career after undergoing multiple Tommy John Surgeries. It is noted that despite the taxing toll of multiple elbow reconstructions, Eovaldi was able to successfully return to his elite form posting a 41-27 record and two all star selections following the reconstructions. Eovaldi recovery highlights how modern surgical techniques and strategies can allow players to return to the mound even after multiple surgeries.

Shohei Ohtani, considered one of the greatest, faced a UCL tear in 2023, but he did not let the injury affect his historic trajectory. Ohtani is a rare 2-way player but not being able to throw did not stop him, he continued to play as a designated hitter. Though baseball insiders speculated that the elbow damage would decrease his free-agent value, Ohtani proved that he was an exception to the sports convention. He later signed a 10 year, 700 million dollar contract with the Los Angeles Dodgers. Ohtani did not let Tommy John surgery change his career which is something that is very rare.

== See also ==
- Biomechanics of baseball pitching
