= 12–6 curveball =

Baseball pitch

An example of the topspin applied by pitchers to a 12–6 curveball

The 12–6 curveball is a type of pitch thrown in baseball. It is categorized as a breaking ball because of its downward break. The 12–6 curveball, unlike the normal curveball (also referred to as the "11 to 5 curve" or a "2 to 8 curve" for its motion), breaks in a downward motion in a straight line. This explains the name "12–6", because the break of the pitch refers to the ball breaking from the 12 o'clock position to 6 o'clock on a clock face. While the 11–5 and 2–8 variations are very effective pitches, they are less effective than a true 12–6, because the ball will break into the heart of the bat more readily.

The pitch is used throughout Major League Baseball. It has several nicknames, including the "yellow hammer" and "drop curveball".

== Movement ==
The 12 to 6 curveball is the toughest type of curveball to hit, because it moves vertically, and has no horizontal break. The difference of the speed from a fastball and the break make the pitch difficult to hit if a pitcher uses it correctly in a pitching sequence. The 12 to 6 curveball is usually pitched from the overhand motion, as a three-quarters or sidearm delivery would cause the ball to break 2 to 8 instead of 12 to 6. The sharp vertical break on the 12–6 curveball is created when pitchers apply topspin to the ball with their fingers in the process of releasing it.

== Effectiveness ==
Depending on the situation and the type of pitcher, the 12–6 curveball may be more or less effective. Against a batter with the same handedness as the pitcher, the 12 to 6 curveball has been proven to be a very effective pitch in general, but the pitch is much easier to hit if the batter is the opposite handedness of the pitcher, making an 11 to 5 curveball the more effective pitch type in that situation. The effectiveness of the pitch also depends on the ability of the pitcher to apply topspin to the ball, creating movement. When stats for a high level pitcher's average 12 to 6 curveball are factored in, the 12 to 6 and the 11 to 5 are much more effective than Major League Baseball's average throwers of the pitch due to the pitcher's high level of ability for that pitch.

== Throwing mechanics ==
The 12–6 curveball is thrown similarly to most curveballs. The pitch is generally thrown using a four-seam grip, in which the middle finger on the pitcher's throwing hand is placed in the gap between the two seams on the right side, and the index finger is placed directly next to it. The pitcher's thumb is placed directly on the bottom of the baseball. This grip allows the pitcher to create a high amount of topspin while still having a good control of the pitch. The pitch is then thrown with an exaggerated 12–6 motion with both the middle finger and the thumb simultaneously helping move the baseball towards home plate, while the pitcher's index finger giving the ball topspin. This extensive combination of mechanics makes this one of the most difficult pitches to master.

== Notable practitioners ==
- The 12–6 generally agreed upon as the most effective of all time belonged to Dodgers Hall of Famer Sandy Koufax.
- 2002 Cy Young Award winner Barry Zito, formerly of the Oakland Athletics and San Francisco Giants, threw a 12–6 curve that was, at one point, widely recognized as the best in baseball.
- Three-time Cy Young Award winner Clayton Kershaw of the Los Angeles Dodgers throws a 12–6 curve that was labelled by Hall of Fame broadcaster Vin Scully as "Public Enemy #1."
- Nolan Ryan, Major League Baseball's all time leader in career strikeouts, deployed a 12–6 curveball that could reach up to 89mph, and was described by Bill James and Rob Neyer as being able to "break so hard it'd take your stomach away."
- Long-time St. Louis Cardinals pitcher Adam Wainwright is noted for having an especially effective 12–6 curveball, colloquially named "Uncle Charlie" by Wainwright and St. Louis fans.
