= Fosh (baseball) =

Type of baseball pitch

The fosh, fosh ball, foshball, or fosh change is a seldom used pitch in Major League Baseball described as "a cross between a split-fingered pitch and a straight change-up". It is designed to fool a batter expecting a fastball to have to contend with a slower pitch. The pitch has a grip like a fastball, but the index and middle fingers are spread slightly across the baseball, and the ring and little finger wrap around the side of the ball. If thrown properly, it has characteristics like a breaking change-up or an off-speed split-finger fastball.

The origin of the fosh is unknown. Mike Boddicker was the first pitcher known to throw it, having tried it in the 1980s. As pitching coach for the Boston Red Sox, Al Nipper taught the pitch to Jeff Suppan in 1995, and Tom Gordon and Roger Clemens in 1996. Other pitchers who have used it in a game are Jason Frasor, Trevor Hoffman, Johan Santana, Jason Bere, Carl Pavano, and Carlos Rosa.

There are various etymologies for the term "fosh". According to The Neyer/James Guide to Pitchers: An Historical Compendium of Pitching, Pitchers, and Pitches, three derivations are known. One is that Earl Weaver described it as "a cross between a fastball and a dead fish". Another is a description by David Nied, who said the term sounds "like the perfect word for the movement of the pitch". A third derivation, from Al Nipper, is that fosh is an acronym for "full of ...".
