= Forkball =

Baseball pitch

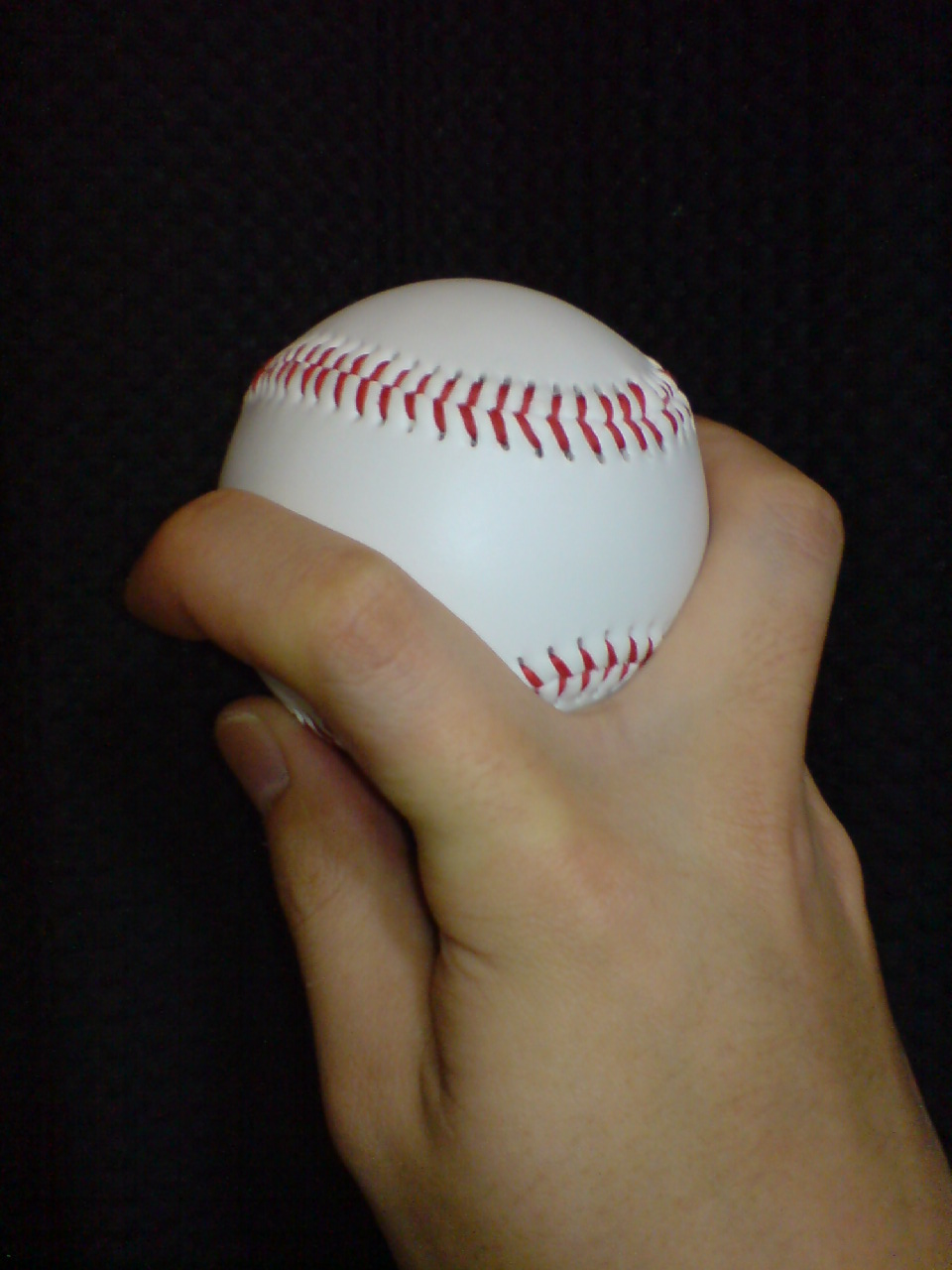
The grip used for a forkball

The forkball is a type of pitch in baseball. Related to the split-finger fastball, the forkball is held between the first two fingers and thrown hard, snapping the wrist. Because its movement is similar to that of a spitball, the pitch is often called the "dry spitter".

The forkball differs from the split-fingered fastball, however, in that the ball is jammed deeper between the first two fingers. The result is that the forkball is generally thrown slightly slower than the splitter, but has more of a "tumbling" action akin to the movement of a 12–6 curveball, as it will drop off the plate before it gets to the catcher's mitt.

== Use in professional baseball ==
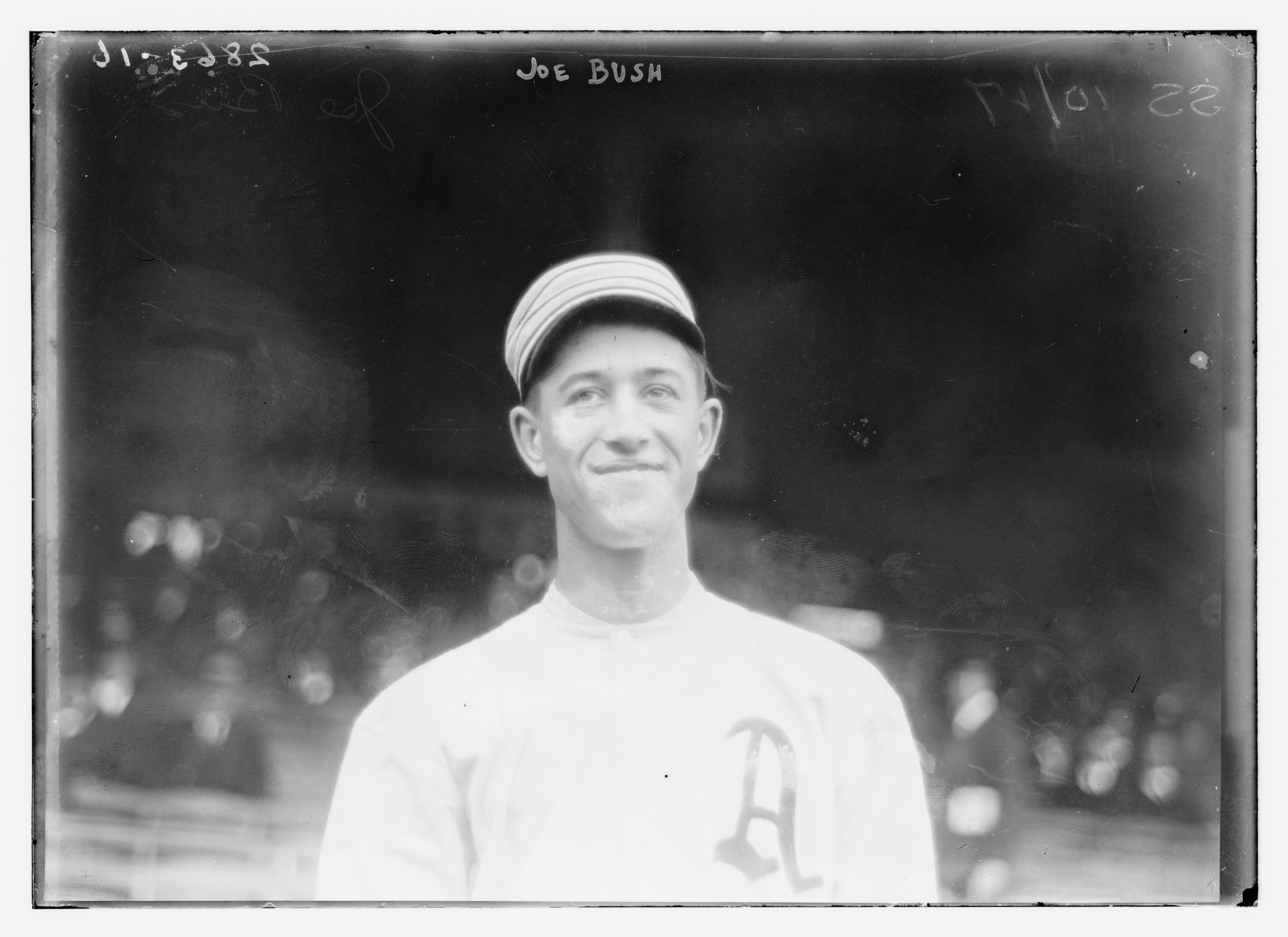
Bullet Joe Bush, who is credited with inventing the forkball

Joe Bush, a pitcher from the 1910s and 1920s who played for the Philadelphia Athletics and Boston Red Sox, is credited with the invention of the forkball, shortly following World War I.

The pitch has been favored by several current and former major league pitchers, including Tom Henke, Kevin Appier, Hideo Nomo, José Valverde, José Arredondo, Ken Hill, Justin Speier, Kazuhiro Sasaki, José Contreras, Chien-Ming Wang, Junichi Tazawa, Robert Coello, Edwar Ramírez. Notably, Kodai Senga of the New York Mets has an effective forkball, nicknamed the "ghost fork". Many of these pitchers are also cited for throwing split-finger fastballs given the similarity between the pitches. In the case of Hideo Nomo, and many Japanese pitchers, they were able to change speeds and breaks on their "tumblers". The slower pitches with the bigger breaks were called forkballs, while the faster pitches with the more sudden drops were called split-finger fastballs, regardless of the grip.

Roy Face and Lindy McDaniel were relief pitchers who pitched for 16 and 21 years, respectively, in the Major Leagues and were forkballers. Face started his career in 1953 and McDaniel in 1955. Face singlehandedly made the forkball a topic of popularized discussion through his effective use of the pitch.

The forkball was adopted by Hall of Famer Sandy Koufax towards the end of his career to make up for lost velocity due to arm injuries and to replace his rarely used changeup, which he considered to be ineffective.
