= Overhand throw =

Single-handed throw of an object from above the shoulder

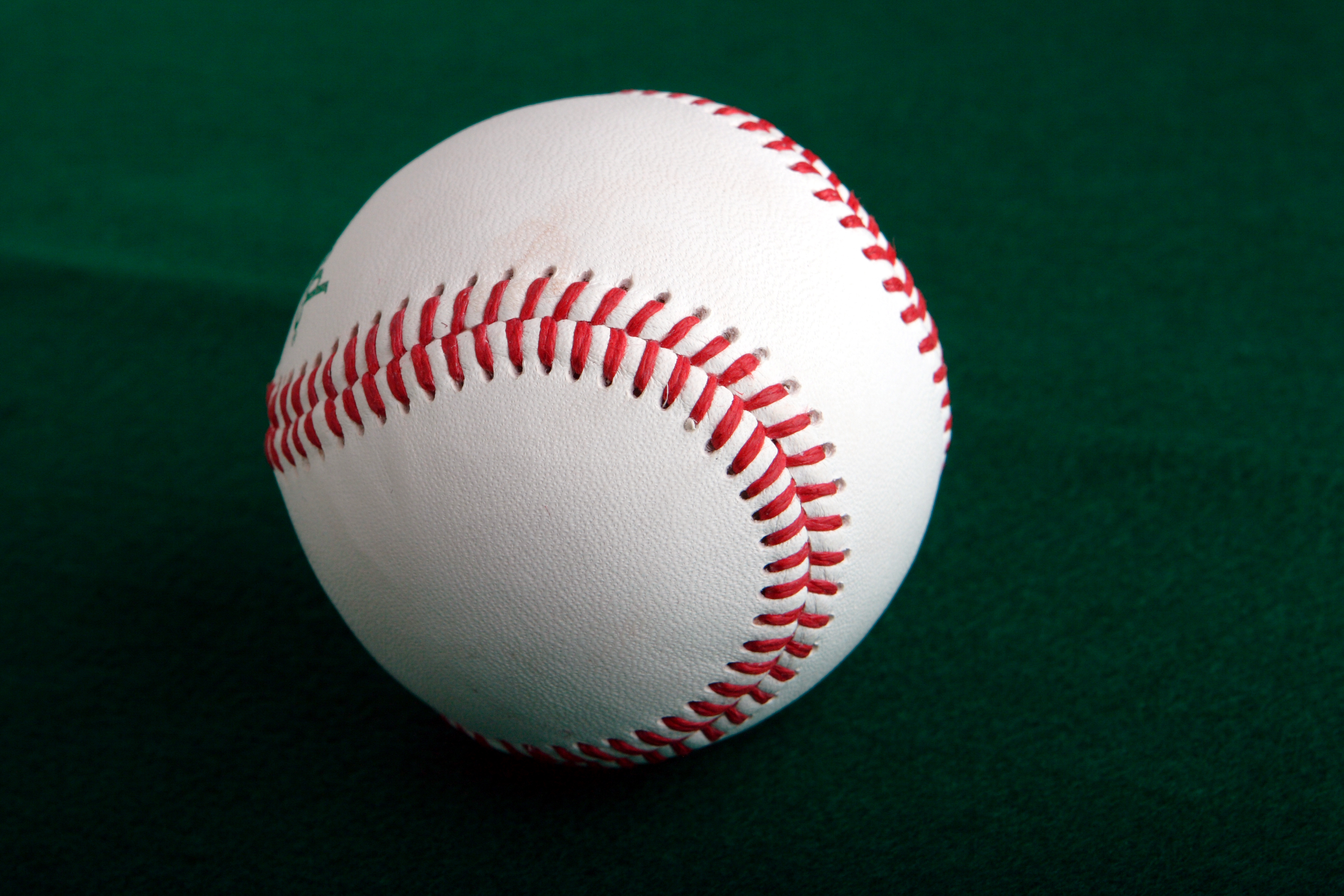
Ball speeds of 105 miles per hour (169 km/h) have been recorded in baseball.

The overhand (or overhead) throw is a single-handed throw of a projectile where the object is thrown above the shoulder.

The overhand throw is a complex motor skill that involves the entire body in a series of linked movements starting from the legs, progressing up through the pelvis and trunk, and culminating in a ballistic motion in the arm that propels a projectile forward. It is used almost exclusively in athletic events. The throwing motion can be broken down into three basic steps: cocking, accelerating, and releasing.

Desired qualities in the action produce a fast, accurate throw. These qualities are affected by the physical attributes of the thrower like height, strength, and flexibility. However it is mainly the throwing motion mechanics and the thrower's ability to coordinate them that determines the quality of the throw. Determining the desired qualities of the throwing motion is difficult to assess due to the extremely short amount of time that it takes professionals to perform the motion.

== The motion ==
In the overhead throwing motion the body is a kinetic chain, and the efficiency of the kinetic chain determines the quality of the throw (velocity and accuracy of the projectile). The thrower uses muscle segments throughout the whole body to transfer potential energy from the lower extremities to the upper extremities where it is then transformed into kinetic energy as the projectile is released.

This throwing motion is described based on the analysis of professional athletes, mainly baseball pitchers, as they are recognized as having mastered this skill. There are variations in the throwing motion unique to the thrower, but generally the throwing motion is performed as follows.

=== Starting position ===
Proper technique for the start of the overhead throwing motion involves the thrower's body facing approximately 90 degrees from the intended target, with the throwing arm on the opposite side.

=== Cocking ===
The first stage of the throwing motion includes the time from the start of the motion to when the shoulder has reached its maximum external rotation. The throwing motion is initiated by first taking a stride toward the target with the leg opposite of the throwing arm. The stride foot should be in line with the thrower's stance foot and the target; placing the foot wide from the target creates a breakdown of the motion due to over-rotation of the pelvis, and placing the foot inward from the target forces the thrower to throw across his or her body. The purpose of the stride is to increase the distance over which linear and angular trunk motions occur, allowing more energy to be produced and transferred up the body. The stride step is performed while raising the throwing arm back to the point of maximum external shoulder rotation. At this point the arm is fully “cocked”. The ball does not move forward during the cocking stage.

=== Acceleration ===
The acceleration phase is initiated once the projectile begins its forward motion, which is also about the same time as the stride foot makes contact with the ground. The acceleration phase is the most explosive part of the overhead throwing motion, as the projectile's velocity increases from zero to its maximum velocity in this short amount of time. The ball is brought forward while the thrower's body rotates towards the target starting from the stride foot, moving up to the pelvis, followed by the trunk and spinal rotation, and then up to the shoulders. Although not visibly obvious, trunk muscular control is an important factor in high velocity throwing During this phase the thrower's trunk will tilt to the side opposite the throwing arm to allow for greater distance of acceleration, which transfers more energy to the projectile. The acceleration phase ends at the time of the projectile's release from the hand, at which point it has attained its maximum velocity.

=== Release and follow-through ===
Where the ball is released depends on the distance of the thrower's target; a farther target requires a higher release point and the same applies conversely. The purpose of the follow-through is to decelerate the throwing arm. Once the projectile is released the throwing arm keeps moving across the body. This rapid deceleration is actually the most violent part of the throwing motion, as the greatest amount of joint loading occurs at this stage. For professional baseball pitchers the leg opposite the stride leg also steps forward and squares the pitcher with his target.

== Uses ==
The main use of the overhead throwing motion is for competitive sports, including:

- Baseball
- Cricket
- Quarterback position in American football.
- Handball
- Volleyball: serving a ball uses similar overhead motions.
- Water polo
- Javelin throw
- Shot put
- Dodgeball
- Axe throwing

== Related injuries ==
Frequent use of the overhead throwing motion at high performance levels, such as by professional athletes, can lead to injury. This is due to the large amount of stress placed on the elbow and shoulder, which are the most common areas injured. These injuries can include but are not limited to:

=== Elbow injuries ===
- Torn ulnar collateral ligament of elbow joint (requires Tommy John surgery)
- Injury to the common flexor tendon

=== Shoulder injuries ===
- Injury to the rotator cuff
- Injury to the labrum
- Scapular dyskinesia

=== Abdominal injuries ===
- Injury to the oblique muscles
