= Vulcan changeup =

Type of baseball pitch

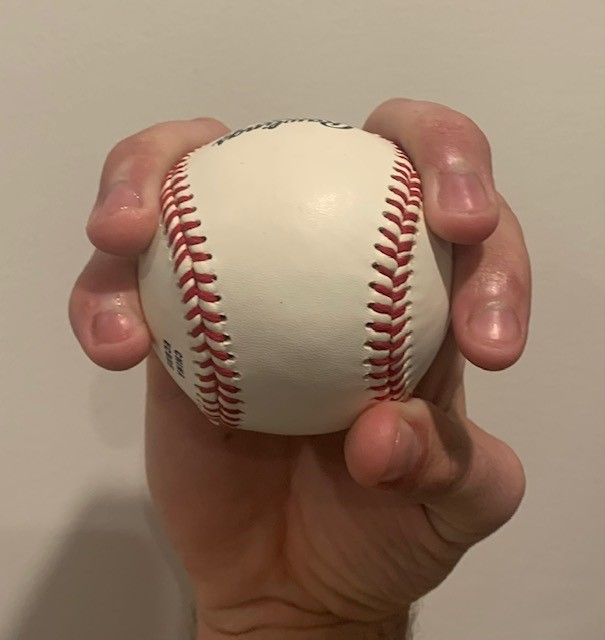
Vulcan changeup grip.

In baseball, the vulcan changeup pitch (otherwise known as a vulcan or trekkie) is a type of changeup; it closely resembles a forkball and split-finger fastball. It is a variation of the circle changeup, and when mastered can be extremely effective. Much like a forkball, the vulcan is gripped between two fingers on the hand, but rather than the middle and index finger as with the forkball or split-finger fastball, it sits in between the middle and ring fingers to make a v-shape (Vulcan salute) when releasing to the catcher. It is thrown with fastball arm speed but by pronating the hand by turning the thumb down, to get good downward movement on it.

The pitch is uncommon in Major League Baseball. Ian Kennedy threw this style of changeup instead of others because he "found it more comfortable and had more movement". Among the others who have thrown it are John Gant, former relievers Randy Tomlin and Joe Nelson, and former All-Star closer Éric Gagné, for whom the vulcan changeup was considered one of his best pitches. Roy Oswalt adopted this pitch during the 2010 offseason and preferred it over the circle changeup. Most notably, Paul Skenes, the first overall pick of the 2023 draft and a two-time All-Star, throws a vulcan changeup. Joey Cantillo also throws a vulcan changeup, as does Jonah Tong.

Danny Hosley, closer for the Savannah Bananas, throws a Vulcan changeup as his out pitch.

Nelson explained his choice for naming the pitch: "It was either going to be Nanu Nanu or the Vulcan. Spock just seemed like a cooler character than Mork." The pitch has been nicknamed the "Trekkie", because of the Vulcan symbol, from the television show Star Trek, that appears in the grip of the ball.

== History and development ==
The pitch was developed in 1994 by pitcher Joe Nelson while playing at Seminole Junior College in Oklahoma. Nelson's coach had encouraged him to learn a split-finger fastball, but because Nelson was unable to spread his index and middle fingers wide enough to hold the ball comfortably, he instead experimented by wedging the ball between his middle and ring fingers. The resulting grip formed a "V" shape resembling the Vulcan salute from Star Trek, prompting him to name the pitch the "Vulcan." While playing as a junior for the University of San Francisco, the unique grip required catchers to signal for the pitch using an inverted Vulcan salute between their legs, which required specialized manual dexterity from the catcher.

To maintain the finger flexibility needed to throw the pitch, Nelson warmed up in the bullpen by stretching the divide between his middle and ring fingers using a golf ball.
