= Curveball =

Type of pitch in baseball

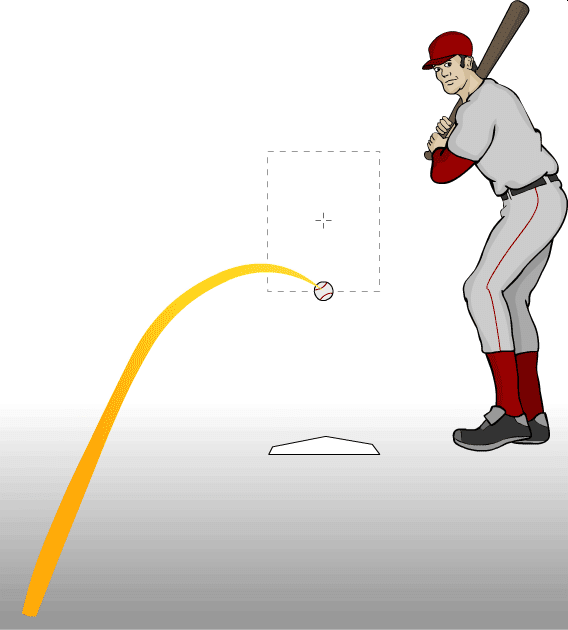
A diagram of a 12–6 curveball

In baseball and softball, the curveball is a type of pitch thrown with a characteristic grip and hand movement that imparts forward spin to the ball, causing it to dive or drop as it approaches the plate. Varieties of curveball include the 12–6 curveball, power curveball, and the knuckle curve. Its close relatives are the slider and the slurve. The "curve" of the ball varies from pitcher to pitcher.

== Grip and action ==
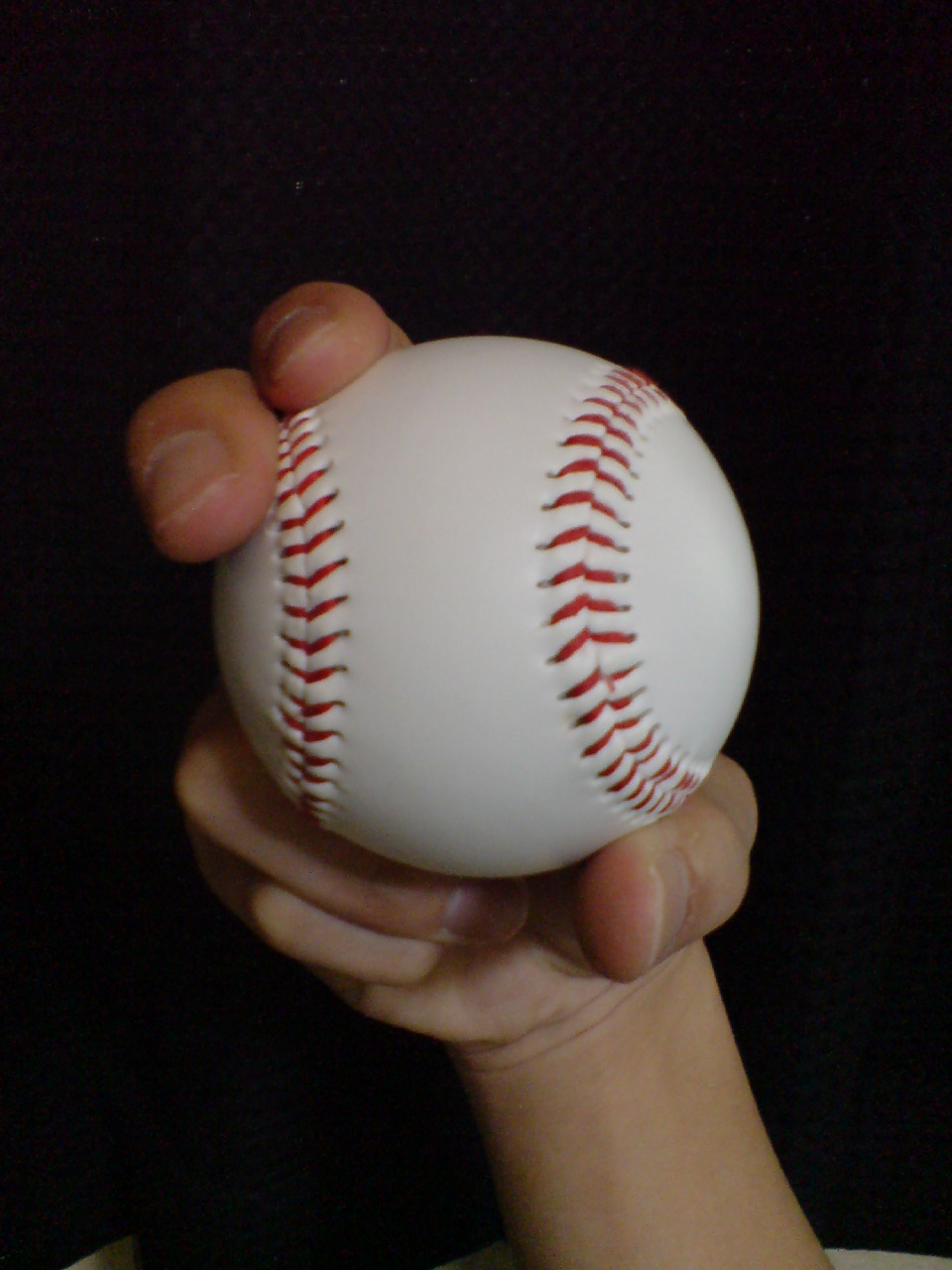
Grip of a curveball

The curveball is typically gripped in a manner similar to holding a cup or a glass. The pitcher positions the middle finger along and parallel to one of the ball's long seams, while the thumb is placed on the seam opposite, forming a "C shape" when viewed from above, with the horseshoe-shaped seam facing inward toward the palm. The index finger is aligned alongside the middle finger, while the remaining two fingers are folded toward the palm, with the knuckle of the ring finger resting against the leather. Some pitchers may extend these two fingers away from the ball to prevent interference during the throwing motion. The grip and throwing mechanics of the curveball closely resemble those of the slider.

The delivery of a curveball is entirely different from that of most other pitches. The pitcher at the top of the throwing arc will snap the arm and wrist in a downward motion. The ball first leaves contact with the thumb and tumbles over the index finger thus imparting the forward or "top-spin" characteristic of a curveball. The result is the exact opposite pitch of the four-seam fastball's backspin, but with all four seams rotating in the direction of the flight path with forward-spin, with the axis of rotation perpendicular to the intended flight path, much like a reel mower or a bowling ball.

The amount of break on the ball depends on how hard the pitcher can snap the throw off, or how much forward spin can be put on the ball. The harder the snap, the more the pitch will break. Curveballs primarily break downwards, but can also break toward the pitcher's off hand to varying degrees. Unlike the fastball, the apex of the ball's flight path arc does not necessarily need to occur at the pitcher's release point, and often peaks shortly afterwards. Curveballs are thrown with considerably less speed than fastballs, because of both the unnatural delivery of the ball and the general rule that pitches thrown with less speed will break more. A typical curveball in the major collegiate level and above will average between 65 and 80 mph, with the average MLB curve, as of the 2025 MLB Season, being approximately 80.5 mph.

From a hitter's perspective, a curveball initially appears to travel toward a specific location—often high in the strike zone, above the batter's waist — before rapidly dropping as it approaches the plate. The most effective curveballs begin breaking at the apex of their flight path and continue to break increasingly sharply as they approach and pass through the strike zone. A curveball that lacks sufficient spin will fail to break significantly and is commonly referred to as a "hanging curve". These pitches are particularly disadvantageous for pitchers, as their low speed and minimal movement often leave them high in the strike zone, making them easy for hitters to time and drive with power.

Diagram of the movement of a thrown curveball

The curveball is a popular and effective pitch in professional baseball, but it is not particularly widespread in leagues with players younger than college level. This is with regard for the safety of the pitcher, not because of its difficulty, though the pitch is widely considered difficult to learn as it requires some degree of mastery and the ability to pinpoint the thrown ball's location. There is generally a greater chance of throwing wild pitches when throwing the curveball.

When thrown correctly, it could have a break from seven to as much as 20 inches in comparison to the same pitcher's fastball.

=== Safety ===
Due to the unnatural motion required to throw it, the curveball is considered a more advanced pitch and poses inherent risk of injury to a pitcher's elbow and shoulder. There has been a controversy, as reported in The New York Times, March 12, 2012, about whether curveballs alone are responsible for injuries in young pitchers or whether the number of pitches thrown is the predisposing factor. In theory, allowing time for the cartilage and tendons of the arm to fully develop would protect against injuries. While acquisition of proper form might be protective, physician James Andrews is quoted in the article as stating that in many children, insufficient neuromuscular control, lack of proper mechanics, and fatigue make maintenance of proper form unlikely.

The parts of the arm most commonly injured by the curveball are the ligaments in the elbow, the biceps, and the forearm muscles. Major elbow injury requires repair through elbow ligament reconstruction, or Tommy John surgery.

== Variations ==
Curveballs have a variety of trajectories and breaks among pitchers. This chiefly has to do with the arm slot and release point of a given pitcher, which is in turn governed by how comfortable the pitcher is throwing the overhand curveball.

Pitchers who can throw a curveball completely overhanded with the arm slot more or less vertical will have a curveball that will break straight downwards. This is called a 12–6 curveball as the break of the pitch is on a straight path downwards like the hands of a clock at 12 and 6. The axis of rotation of a 12–6 curve is parallel with the level ground and perpendicular to its flight path.

Pitchers throwing their curveballs with the arm slot at an angle will throw a curveball that breaks down and toward the pitcher's off-hand. In the most extreme cases, the curve will break very wide laterally. Because the slider and the curveball share nearly the same grip and have the same unique throwing motions, this curveball breaks much like a slider, and is colloquially termed a "slurve". The axis of rotation on a slurve will still be more or less perpendicular to the flight path of the ball; unlike on a 12–6 curve, however, the axis of rotation will not be parallel to the level ground. With some pitchers, the difference between curveball and other pitches such as slider and slurve may be difficult to detect or even describe. A less common term for this type of curveball is a 1–7 (outdrop, outcurve, dropping roundhouse) or 2–8 (sweeping roundhouse curveball).

A curveball that spins on a vertical axis perpendicular to its flight path, producing complete side spin—3–9 for a right-handed pitcher or 9–3 for a left-handed pitcher—is commonly referred to as a sweeping curveball, flat curveball, or frisbee curveball. While this pitch still drops due to gravity, the absence of significant topspin results in less vertical movement compared to other curveballs, such as the 12–6, 1–7/11–5, or 2–8/10–4 varieties. Side spin typically occurs when a pitcher throws with a sidearm or low three-quarter arm angle, though it can also result from a higher arm slot if the pitcher twists their hand, causing the fingers to move around the side of the ball rather than over the top. This twisting motion is believed to increase the risk of arm injuries, particularly near the elbow.

By contrast, a slider's spin axis is nearly parallel to the ball's flight path, similar to the rotation of a football or bullet, but slightly tilted upward toward 12 o'clock. When the spin axis shifts to 1 o'clock or 2 o'clock, the pitch becomes a slurve. A slurve often occurs when a pitcher applies excessive force to a curveball with insufficient finesse, resulting in a slight pronation at the release point rather than a full supination. Alternatively, a slurve can develop from over-supination when throwing a slider, leading to what is sometimes referred to as a "slurvy slider". A slurvy slider thrown with the same speed as a power slider (typically 5–8 mph slower than a fastball) may exhibit greater lateral break.

== Physics ==
Generally the Magnus effect describes the laws of physics that make a curveball curve. A fastball travels through the air with backspin, which creates a higher pressure zone in the air ahead of and under the baseball. The baseball's raised seams augment the ball's ability to develop a boundary layer and therefore a greater differential of pressure between the upper and lower zones. The effect of gravity is partially counteracted as the ball rides on and into increased pressure. Thus the fastball falls less than a ball thrown without spin (neglecting knuckleball effects) during the 60 feet 6 inches it travels to home plate.

On the other hand, a curveball, thrown with topspin, creates a higher pressure zone on top of the ball, which deflects the ball downward in flight. Instead of counteracting gravity, the curveball adds additional downward force, thereby giving the ball an exaggerated drop in flight.

== Real or illusion? ==
There was once a debate on whether a curveball actually curves or is an optical illusion. In 1949, Ralph B. Lightfoot, an aeronautical engineer at Sikorsky Aircraft, used wind tunnel tests to prove that a curveball curves. On whether a curveball is caused by an illusion, Baseball Hall of Fame pitcher Dizzy Dean has been quoted in a number of variations on this basic premise: "Stand behind a tree 60 feet away, and I will whomp you with an optical illusion!"

However, optical illusion caused by the ball's spinning may play an important part in what makes curveballs difficult to hit. The curveball's trajectory is smooth, but the batter perceives a sudden, dramatic change in the ball's direction. When an object that is spinning and moving through space is viewed directly, the overall motion is interpreted correctly by the brain. However, as it enters the peripheral vision, the internal spinning motion distorts how the overall motion is perceived. A curveball's trajectory begins in the centre of the batter's vision, but overlaps with peripheral vision as it approaches the plate, which may explain the suddenness of the break perceived by the batter. A peer-reviewed article on this hypothesis was published in 2010.

== Nicknames ==
Popular nicknames for the curveball include "the bender" and "the hook" (both describing the trajectory of the pitch), as well as "the yakker" and "Uncle Charlie". New York Mets pitcher Dwight Gooden threw a curve so deadly that it was nicknamed "Lord Charles" and the great hitter Bill Madlock called it "the yellow hammer"—apparently because it came down like a hammer and was too yellow to get hit by a bat. Because catchers frequently use two fingers to signal for a curve, the pitch is also referred to as "the deuce" or "number two".

== History ==
Candy Cummings, a star pitcher in the 1860s and 1870s, is widely credited with inventing the curveball. In his biography of Cummings, Stephen Katz provides proof. Several other pitchers of Cummings's era claimed to have invented the curveball. One was Fred Goldsmith. Goldsmith maintained that he gave a demonstration of the pitch on August 16, 1870, at the Capitoline Grounds in Brooklyn, New York, and that renowned sportswriter Henry Chadwick had covered it in the Brooklyn Eagle on August 17, 1870. However, Stephen Katz, in his biography of Cummings, shows that Goldsmith's claim was not credible, and that Goldsmith's reference to an article by Chadwick in the Brooklyn Eagle was likely fabricated. Other claimants to invention of the curveball are shown by Katz to have gotten the curveball only after Cummings, or not to have been pitching curveballs.

John Thorn, the Official Baseball Historian of Major League Baseball, credits Joseph McElroy Mann of Princeton University as the first known college baseball player to master the curveball. About 1872, another Princeton man, James Winthrop Hageman, of the class of 1872, was reputed to be a curve ball pitcher, but it was his change of pace that fooled the batsmen. It was not until "Mac" Mann made a scientific study of the art that players began to realize its full value. "The fact that so many professionals seemed ignorant of curve pitching and hurried to see Mann proves conclusively that the Princetonian was the first to use the curve with any judgment and control over the ball". Mann is also credited with pitching the first no-run, no-hit game in the annals of baseball.

In 1876, the second known collegiate baseball player to perfect the curveball was Clarence Emir Allen of Western Reserve College, now known as Case Western Reserve University, where he never lost a game. Both Allen, and teammate pitcher John P. Barden, became famous for employing the curve in the late 1870s. In the early 1880s, Clinton Scollard (1860–1932), a pitcher from Hamilton College in New York, became famous for his curve ball and later earned fame as a prolific American poet. In 1885, St. Nicholas, a children's magazine, featured a story entitled, "How Science Won the Game". It told of how a boy pitcher mastered the curveball to defeat the opposing batters.

The New York Clipper reported, of a September 26, 1863, game at Princeton University (then the College of New Jersey), that F. P. Henry's "slow pitching with a great twist to the ball achieved a victory over fast pitching". However, Katz, in his biography of Cummings, explains that Henry was not actually pitching curveballs.

Harvard president Charles Eliot was among those opposed to the curve, claiming it was a dishonest practice unworthy of Harvard students. At an athletics conference at Yale University in 1884 a speaker (thought to be from Harvard, likely Charles Eliot Norton, a cousin of the Harvard president) was reported to have stated: "For the pitcher, instead of delivering the ball to the batter in an honest, straightforward way, that the latter may exert his strength to the best advantage in knocking it, now uses every effort to deceive him by curving—I think that is the word—the ball. And this is looked upon as the last triumph of athletic science and skill. I tell you it is time to call halt! when the boasted progress in athletics is in the direction of fraud and deceit".

In the past, major league pitchers Tommy Bridges, Bob Feller, Virgil Trucks, Herb Score, Camilo Pascual, Sandy Koufax, Bert Blyleven, Nolan Ryan and the aforementioned Dwight Gooden were regarded as having outstanding curveballs. Clayton Kershaw, a pitcher for the Los Angeles Dodgers, was known for having one of the most successful curveballs of all time.

== See also ==
- Biomechanics of Baseball Pitching
