= Setup man =

Pitching role in baseball

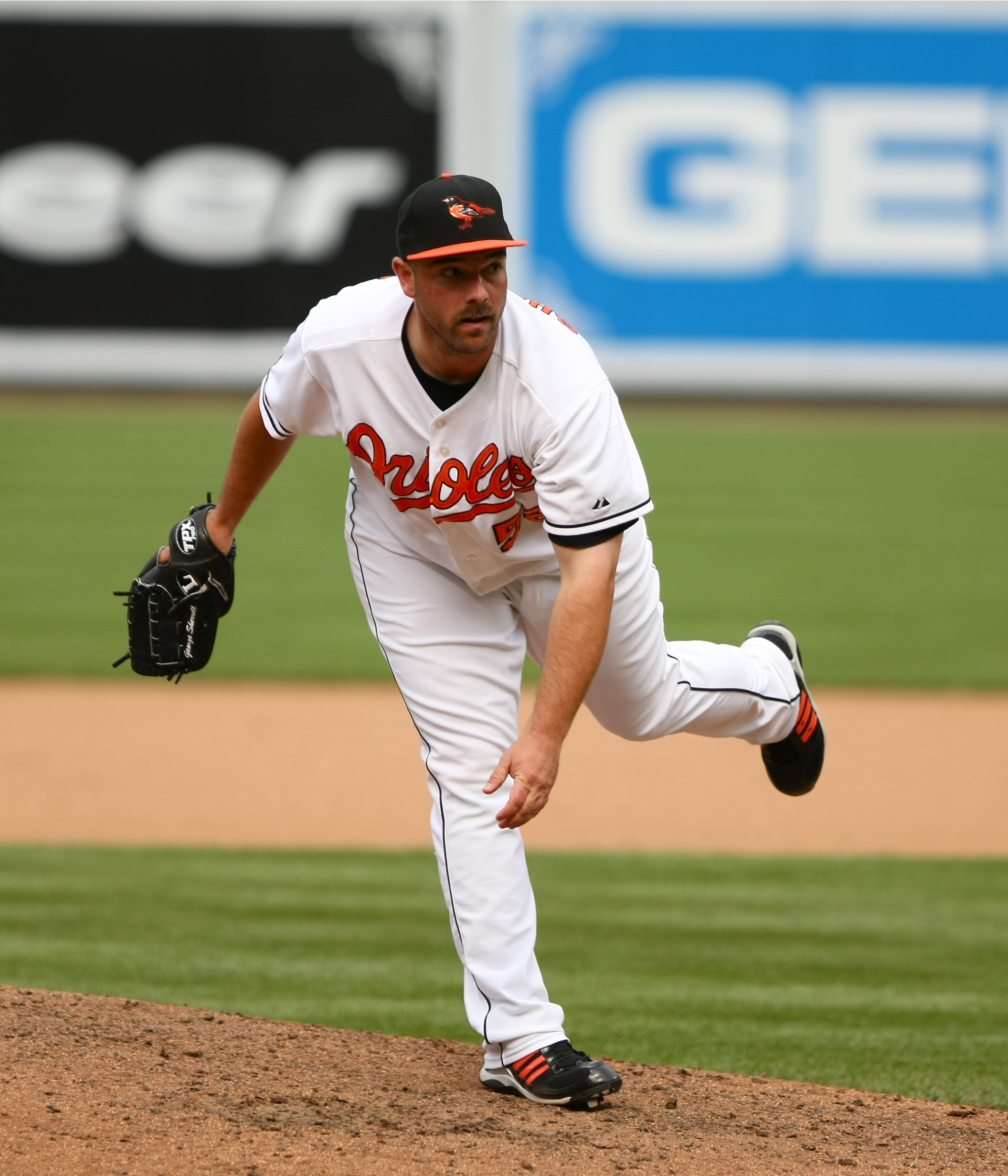
George Sherrill was a setup man for the Seattle Mariners, Baltimore Orioles, and Los Angeles Dodgers.

In baseball, a setup man (or set-up man, also sometimes referred to as a setup pitcher or setup reliever) is a relief pitcher who regularly pitches before the closer. They commonly pitch the eighth inning, with the closer pitching the ninth.

As closers were reduced to one-inning specialists, setup men became more prominent. Setup pitchers often come into the game with the team losing or the game tied. They are usually the second best relief pitcher on a team, behind the closer. After closers became one-inning pitchers, primarily in the ninth inning, setup pitchers became more highly valued. A pitcher who succeeds in this role is often promoted to a closer, and often fill in for the regular closer when the regular closer needs a day off for rest. Setup men are paid less than closers and mostly make less than the average Major League salary.

The most common statistic used to evaluate relievers is the save. Due to the definition of the statistic, setup men are rarely in position to record a save even if they pitch well, but they can be charged with a blown save if they pitch poorly. The hold statistic was developed to help acknowledge a setup man's effectiveness, but it is not an official Major League Baseball (MLB) statistic.

Historically, setup men were rarely selected to MLB All-Star Games, with the nod usually going to closers with large save totals. From 1971 through 2000, only six relievers with fewer than five saves at midseason were selected as All-Stars. There were 10 such players from 2001 through 2009. In 2015, the majority of the American League's All-Star relievers were not closers, outnumbered 4–3. Setup men who have been named All-Stars multiple times include Tyler Clippard, Dellin Betances, and Andrew Miller.

Francisco Rodriguez, who was a setup pitcher for the Anaheim Angels in 2002, tied starting pitcher Randy Johnson's Major League Baseball record for wins in a single postseason after recording his fifth victory in the 2002 World Series.

In 2018, Josh Hader of the Milwaukee Brewers became the first setup man to win the Reliever of the Year Award, an award traditionally given to closers. Hader was then promoted to closer the following year. In 2020, Devin Williams became the second setup man to win the award, pitching as the seventh to eighth inning man for Hader.

Tim McCarver wrote that the New York Yankees in 1996 "revolutionized baseball" with Mariano Rivera, "a middle reliever who should have been on the All-Star team and who was a legitimate MVP candidate." He finished third in the voting for the American League (AL) Cy Young Award, the highest a setup man has finished. That season, Rivera primarily served as a setup pitcher for closer John Wetteland, typically pitching in the seventh and eighth inning of games before Wetteland pitched in the ninth. Their effectiveness gave the Yankees a 70–3 win–loss record that season when leading after six innings. McCarver said the Yankees played "six-inning games" that year, with Rivera dominating for two innings and Wetteland closing out the victory.

Illustrating the general trend, both Rivera and Rodriguez were moved to closer soon after excelling as setup men. On January 22, 2019, Rivera became the first player unanimously elected to the Baseball Hall of Fame, having been inducted his first eligible year on the ballot.
