= Koyo Aoyagi =

Japanese baseball player (born 1993)

Kōyō Aoyagi
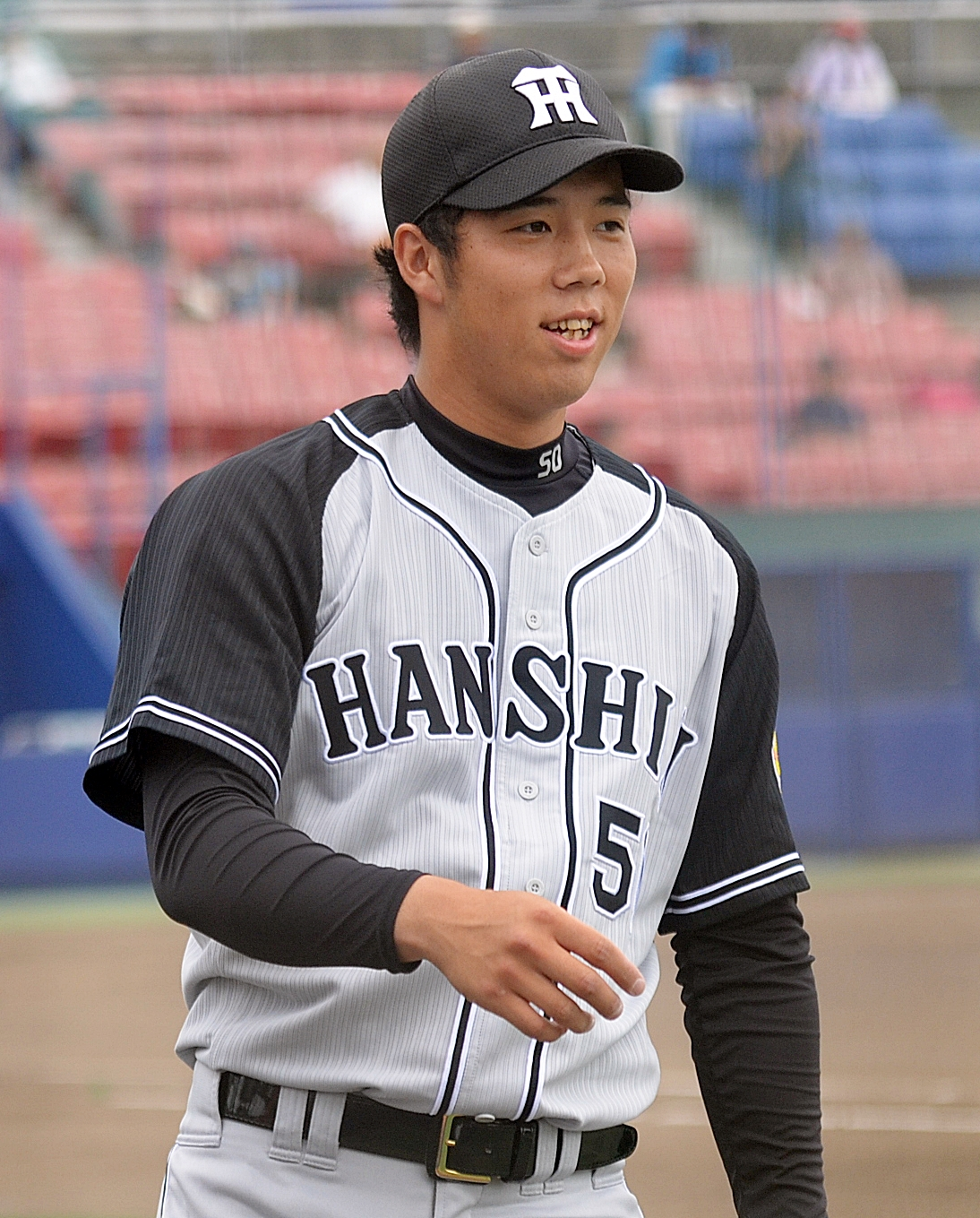
- Aoyagi with the Hanshin Tigers

Tokyo Yakult Swallows – No. 99
- Pitcher
- Born: December 11, 1993 (age 32); Yokohama, Kanagawa Prefecture, Japan
- Bats: Right Throws: Right

NPB debut
- June 1, 2016, for the Hanshin Tigers

NPB statistics (through 2025 season)
- Win–loss record: 61–49
- Earned run average: 3.15
- Strikeouts: 656
- Stats at Baseball Reference

Teams
- Hanshin Tigers (2016–2024); Tokyo Yakult Swallows (2025–present)

Career highlights and awards
- 3× NPB All-Star (2019, 2021, 2022); Japan Series champion (2023); Best Nine Award (2022); 2× Central League wins leader (2021, 2022); Central League ERA leader (2022)
Medals
Men's baseball
Representing Japan
Summer Olympics
Gold medal – first place	2020 Tokyo	Team

Kōyō Aoyagi (青柳 晃洋, Aoyagi Kōyō; born December 11, 1993) is a Japanese professional baseball pitcher for the Tokyo Yakult Swallows of Nippon Professional Baseball (NPB). He has previously played in NPB for the Hanshin Tigers.

== Amateur career ==
Kōyō played ball for the Terao Dolphins as a fifth-grader in primary school, and went on to pitch for Namamugi Junior High. He became the ace pitcher of Kawasaki Kikoka High School in Kanagawa, but his team never made it to any national tournaments.

He entered Teikyo University where he was a regular starter in the Tokyo Metropolitan Area University Baseball League. Despite having undergone right elbow surgery in his third year, he pitched spectacularly the following year where he led the league in wins (6), and was awarded Best Nine. After four years and 37 game appearances, he finished 15–9 with a 1.91 ERA.

== Professional career ==
=== Hanshin Tigers ===
The Hanshin Tigers selected Aoyagi in the fifth round of the 2015 Nippon Professional Baseball draft. He signed a 40 million yen contract with Hanshin, for an estimated annual salary of 7.2 million yen. He was assigned jersey number 50.

==== 2016 ====
While Aoyagi joined the main squad during spring camp and got a shot at pitching during one preseason game against the Chiba Lotte Marines, he struggled with control as he walked the first 3 batters he faced, and ended up giving up 2 runs in 2 innings of relief.

Aoyagi debuted as a starter in the June 1 away game against the Tohoku Rakuten Golden Eagles, as a last minute replacement for the scheduled starter Yuya Yokoyama, who was experiencing a bout of shoulder pain. Despite walking 4 and hitting 1 batter, he completed 5 innings and only allowed one run, earning the win. He became the first right-handed Hanshin pitcher to win his first official start since Minoru Murayama in 1959, and the third rookie pitcher in NPB history to win his first start during inter–league play.

Aoyagi's next start was on July 7 in the Tokyo Dome, where he shut down the Yomiuri Giants by pitching 7 perfect innings while allowing only a single hit. After this, he became a regular in the Tiger's pitching rotation. Despite a strong start, Aoyagi lost momentum during mid-season, and he finished the season with only 4 wins out of 13 games with a 3.29 ERA. While his win–loss percentage might be unimpressive, he only surrendered a single home run out of 289 at–bats.

During the post-season break, Aoyagi pitched for Samurai Japan (national team) in the Asia Winter League tournament in Taiwan. He notched 2 wins and 1 save in 4 games (1.69 ERA), and was awarded the league's best pitcher, also won by fellow Hanshin pitcher Yuta Iwasada in the previous year.

==== 2017 ====
Aoyagi's good performance during spring training and preseason exhibition games earned him a spot in the roster at the start of the season. His first start on April 8 was rained out after 3 innings, and got cancelled. As Aoyagi struggled with control in his next two starts and committed errors that lead to runs, he lost both games and got sent back to the farm at the end of April. He got called back to the main squad a few weeks after, and notched his first win against the Yokohama DeNA Baystars on May 28 (6 innings, 8 hits, 2 runs). Aoyagi finished the season with a 4–4 record out of 12 games, and an improved ERA of 3.22. Despite allowing more hits, he allowed fewer walks, and gave up only 2 home runs over 66 innings.

==== 2018 ====
Aoyagi was not in top form in 2018 and spent most of the season pitching in the Western League farm games. Nevertheless, he recorded 6 consecutive farm wins by June, and continued to pitch well after. Aoyagi was eventually called back to the main squad, and was assigned to start the September 2 match against the Baystars, where he recorded his first win of the season. He had 3 more starts after that, but failed to record a win in any of those. Aoyagi finished with a main squad record of 1–1, a 3.32 ERA, and 22 strikeouts, and a Western League record of 8–2, a 2.73 ERA, and 70 strikeouts. He also won the Western League award for highest number of wins. However, Aoyagi's subpar performance in the main squad earned him a 1 million yen pay cut.

==== 2019 ====
Aoyagi began the 2019 campaign as part of the main squad starting rotation, and appeared regularly throughout the season. He lost his first two starts and did not win until April 23 against the Baystars. Aoyagi earned his first career shutout win six days later against the Chunichi Dragons in Nagoya Dome. His succeeding outings were a hit–or–miss, and he finished the season 9–9 with an improved ERA of 3.14 and 100 strikeouts. Despite not throwing any wild pitches and walking relatively few batters, Aoyagi had the worst first pitch hit rate amongst all Nippon Professional Baseball (NPB) starters (48% from 30 hits out of 62 first–pitch swing attempts). He said that the temptation to swing at his first pitch can sometimes work to his advantage as he sometimes ends an inning with just 3 pitches thrown. Most of his outs were ground balls and he topped the league in ground-ball percentage with 64% and ground outs with 40.9%. He also got the most double plays turned amongst all NPB hurlers with 28. This earned him an 18 million pay rise, bringing his annual salary to 30 million yen.

==== 2020 ====
In 2020, Aoyagi continued to be a mainstay in the rotation, although he appeared in fewer matches due to a COVID-19 pandemic–shortened season. He started strong as he won 3 of his first 4 starts, with a 1.50 ERA by early July. But as the season progressed, Aoyagi racked up more losses than wins when he hit a slump in August & September (6.41 ERA). He recovered in October, giving up only 5 runs in his last 6 outings but only recorded 1 win due to lack of early run support. While Aoyagi finished with 7–9 out of 21 starts, his WHIP improved to 1.28, had a lower hit rate of .249 and a better ground out rate of 50.6%. He received another 20 million pay rise, bringing his annual salary to 50 million yen.

==== 2021 ====
Aoyagi started the second game of the 2021 season on March 27 and recorded his first win against the Tokyo Yakult Swallows. All of his starts in April were quality starts and he topped the team in ERA with 1.71 despite earning 2 losses due to lack of run support. Aoyagi won all of his four starts in June and notched a personal best of 1.20 ERA which earned him his first ever Central League MVP of the month award. He and Umeno also won the CL Battery award for June. He continued his winning streak, and by midseason, topped the league in ERA (1.79) and quality start percentage (85.7%), both of which helped him get voted into the All–Star game. By August 24, he was leading the league in wins (10) and ERA.

==== 2022–2024 ====
Aoyagi made 24 appearances for Hanshin in 2022, posting a 13-4 record and 2.05 ERA with 132 strikeouts across 162 1/3 innings pitched. He pitched in 18 contests for the Tigers during the 2023 campaign, registering an 8-6 record and 4.57 ERA with 64 strikeouts across 100 1/3 innings pitched.

Aoyagi made 12 appearances for Hanshin in 2024, compiling a 2-3 record and 3.69 ERA with 35 strikeouts over 61 innings of work. On December 4, 2024, the Tigers posted Aoyagi to Major League Baseball (MLB).

=== Philadelphia Phillies ===
On January 17, 2025, Aoyagi signed a minor league contract with the Philadelphia Phillies. In 23 appearances (six starts) split between the Double-A Reading Fightin Phils and Triple-A Lehigh Valley IronPigs, he struggled to a 1-3 record and 7.22 ERA with 28 strikeouts across 33 2/3 innings pitched. Aoyagi was released by the Phillies organization on July 23.

=== Tokyo Yakult Swallows ===
On July 26, 2025, Aoyagi returned to Japan and signed with the Tokyo Yakult Swallows of Nippon Professional Baseball.

== Pitching style ==
2020 Pitching Stats
Pitch	Percent Thrown	Average speed km/h	Strikeout Rate
Two-seam	49%	141	25.39%
Slider	16%	122	20.12%
Four-seam	13%	141	23.14%
Sinker	12%	124	17.72%
Cutter	8%	130	23.76%

A sidewinder and sometimes submarine pitcher, Aoyagi throws a two-seam fastball around 87 mph as his main pitch, alternating with a high-70s slider and a four-seam around 88 mph (maxed at 92 mph), with a sinker/changeup around 80 mph and a cutter. During the 2019 autumn camp, retired legendary Dragons pitcher Masahiro Yamamoto taught him how to throw a sinker (similar action to a changeup) which proved to be effective against right-handed batters and had the highest fanning rates (9.7%) amongst his pitches but lowest punch out rate (8%).

His reputation as a ground ball pitcher was cemented in 2019 when he topped the league in ground-ball percentage.

When he started in 2016, he performed very poorly against base stealing attempts as he allowed 13 out of 16 attempts to succeed. Afterwards, the coaches worked on his reaction time and pickoff throwing skills. His fielding skills also leave much to be desired and is a work in progress as he has trouble making accurate throws during assists.

He was clocked at 6.8 seconds at the 50 meter dash.

== Personal life ==
Aoyagi started throwing from a three-quarters delivery when he started pitching in grade school, then slowly progressed to being a full sidethrower in 6th grade. At first, the team manager tried to fix his mechanics, but eventually decided to encourage him to keep throwing from the side. Despite this, his pitching form was made fun of by other kids so he tried to switch to overhead pitching once more in junior high. His arm started hurting shortly after doing this so he returned to throwing from the side.

Aoyagi is also an avid manga fan. When he first joined the Tigers, he moved into their dormitory with about 300 volumes of the Weekly Shōnen Magazine. When he played in the 2016 Winter League, he kept posting sad tweets of not being able to read the magazine in Taiwan. Kodansha, the manga's publisher, read about Aoyagi's tweets, and promised him that they will reserve copies of the magazine that he wasn't able to read while overseas. The company sent 3 weeks worth of the magazine to the Tiger's camp when Aoyagi returned to Japan. Kodansha is thinking about naming him their manga publicity ambassador.
