= Jake Bird (baseball) =

American baseball player (born 1995)

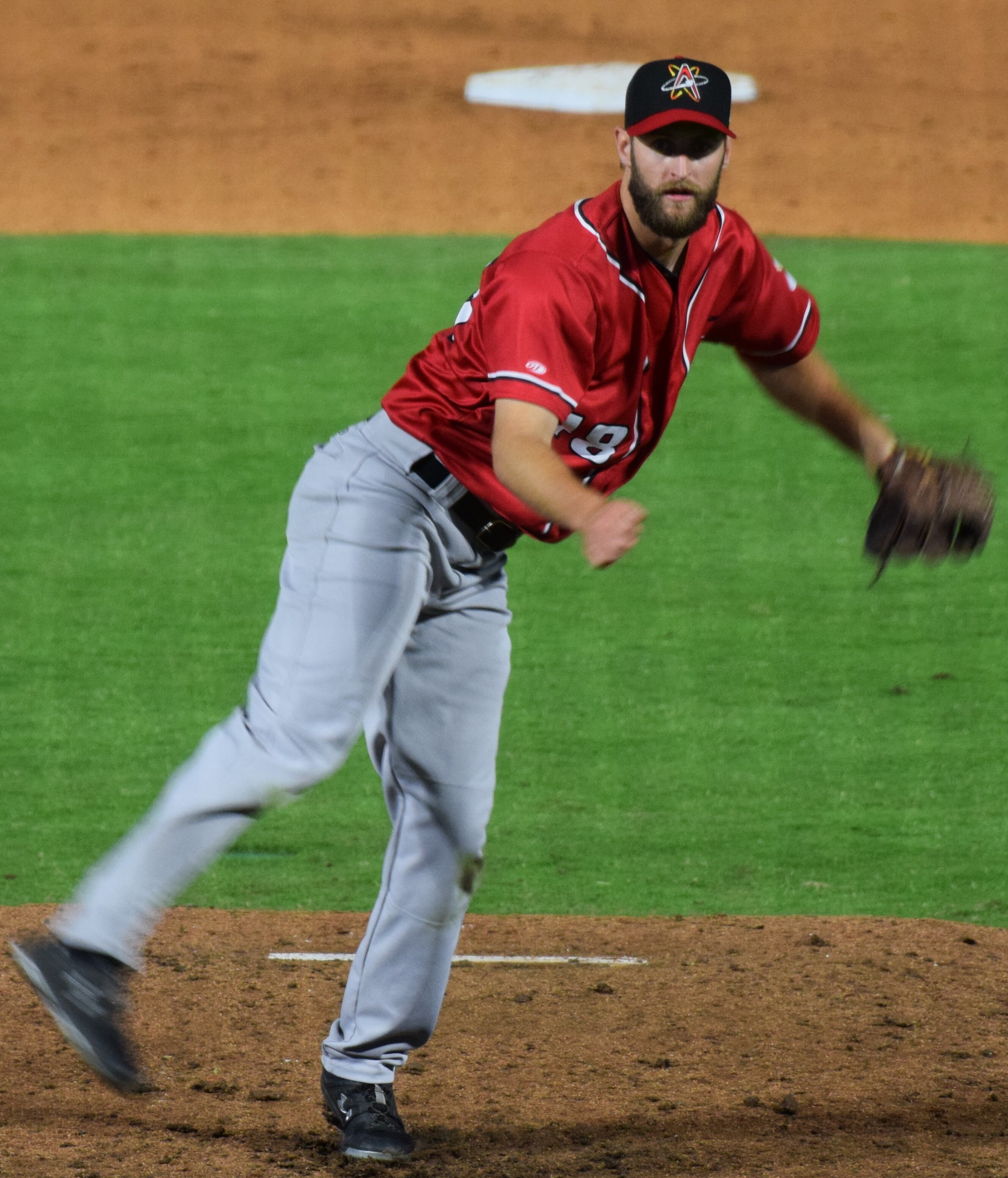
- Bird with the Albuquerque Isotopes in 2022

Washington Nationals – No. 59
- Pitcher
- Born: December 4, 1995 (age 30); Newhall, California, U.S.
- Bats: Right Throws: Right

MLB debut
- June 16, 2022, for the Colorado Rockies

MLB statistics (through 2026 season)
- Win–loss record: 12–12
- Earned run average: 4.85
- Strikeouts: 257
- Stats at Baseball Reference

Teams
- Colorado Rockies (2022–2025); New York Yankees (2025–2026); Washington Nationals (2026–present)

Jacob Timothy Bird (born December 4, 1995) is an American professional baseball pitcher for the Washington Nationals of Major League Baseball (MLB). He has previously played in MLB for the Colorado Rockies and New York Yankees. Bird played college baseball for the UCLA Bruins and led the Pac-12 Conference in earned run average (ERA) in 2018. The Rockies selected him in the fifth round of the 2018 MLB draft. He made his MLB debut in 2022.

== Early life ==
Bird was born in Newhall, California and raised in Valencia, California. He identifies as Jewish. His paternal grandmother was Jewish, and his mother is Catholic. He has one older brother and two younger brothers.

When Bird was eight years old, at the end of second grade, he signed his friends' yearbooks as follows: "Save this autograph for when I’m playing in the major leagues."

== Amateur career ==
Bird attended West Ranch High School in Stevenson Ranch, California, pitching and playing outfield for the baseball team, and playing for the basketball team. In his senior year of high school, he pitched to a 1.55 earned run average (ERA) with 72 strikeouts and 11 walks over 58 innings. He was an All-Foothill League selection in 2014. He committed to attend the University of California, Los Angeles (UCLA) to play college baseball for the UCLA Bruins during his senior year.

Unselected in the 2014 Major League Baseball (MLB) draft, Bird enrolled at UCLA, majoring in economics. In 2016, he played collegiate summer baseball with the Falmouth Commodores of the Cape Cod Baseball League, going 3–2 with a 2.77 ERA as a starter. As a junior he was 5–5 with a 2.75 ERA. His pitching repertoire consisted of a heavy sinker that reached 94 mph, a hard slider in the 86-88 mph range, a changeup, and a curveball.

As a senior at UCLA in 2018, Bird had a 7–4 record and started 16 games, leading the Pac-12 Conference with a 2.18 ERA, and striking out 61 batters over 111 2/3 innings. He said: "I'm just trying to pitch contact. My stuff is pretty heavy ... which gets a lot of ground balls... (Just) let the defense do their thing." He was named All-Pac-12, Pac-12 All-Academic first team, and Academic All-America third team. Following the season, he was selected by the Colorado Rockies in the fifth round of the 2018 MLB draft.

== Professional career ==
=== Colorado Rockies ===
==== 2018–2021: Minors ====
Bird signed with the Rockies for a signing bonus of $50,000. He made his professional debut in 2018 with the Grand Junction Rockies of the Rookie-level Pioneer League, going 4–1 with a 3.38 ERA and 30 strikeouts over 26 2/3 innings pitched in relief. In 2019, he played with the Single-A Asheville Tourists and was named a South Atlantic League All-Star. He went 7–2 with two saves and a 3.62 ERA and 80 strikeouts in 87 innings in 40 games, tied for third-most in the league. Bird didn't pitch competitively in 2020, as the minor league season was cancelled due to the COVID-19 pandemic. He spent the off year learning about pitching analytics and body movement, which increased his fastball velocity.

Bird began the 2021 season with the Hartford Yard Goats of the Double-A Northeast, inducing a 70.9% ground ball rate. He was then promoted to the Albuquerque Isotopes of the Triple-A West in early June. Over 39 appearances between the two clubs, Bird went 6–1 with a 3.38 ERA and 59 strikeouts over 58 2/3 innings. He pitched as a reliever in the Arizona Fall League for the Salt River Rafters after the season, and was 0–1 with a save and a 2.84 ERA.

==== 2022: MLB debut ====
Bird returned to the Isotopes to begin the 2022 season. Before he was called up, he had a 2.77 ERA with 34 strikeouts in 26 innings over 22 games, and induced a 64.4% ground ball rate.

On June 11, the Rockies selected Bird's contract and promoted him to the major leagues. He made his MLB debut on June 16, throwing one scoreless inning in relief against the Cleveland Guardians. On July 3, Bird earned his first MLB win after pitching a scoreless 8th inning against the Arizona Diamondbacks. In his rookie season, he was 2–4 with a 4.91 ERA in 47 2/3 innings over 38 games.

==== 2023: Reliever innings leader ====
An oblique muscle injury early in spring training prevented Bird from pitching for Israel in the 2023 World Baseball Classic. Bird was optioned back to the minors before the 2023 season started. However, he was brought back on Opening Day as Daniel Bard went on the injured list. Bird was ejected from a May win over the Philadelphia Phillies after apparently taunting Bryce Harper after he fanned Harper, leading to a bench-clearing brawl.

Bird was Colorado's most-used reliever in 2023. He went 3–3 with a 4.33 ERA in 89 1/3 innings, starting three times. He and Tyler Holton of the Detroit Tigers tied for the most innings by any MLB reliever, 84 1/3, which also tied for the ninth-most by a reliever in franchise history. Bird's 70 pitching appearances led the team and ranked 8th in the National League. He threw the fourth-most for a season in Rockies history among pitchers who had pitched in relief 95% of the time. His 52.6% ground ball percentage was the highest on the team for any pitcher with more than 25 innings pitched. He finished the season with 77 strikeouts and 27 walks.

==== 2024–2025 ====
Bird earned his first MLB save on April 8, 2024. He could not repeat his durability from 2023. He went on the injured list (IL) with an elbow injury for almost a month starting in mid-May. After pitching in three games in his return, he went back on the IL with a groin injury. He was demoted to Triple-A upon his return, returning to the majors in three separate stints. With the Rockies, he was 2–2 with one save and a 4.50 ERA in 40 innings pitched. With two outs and runners in scoring position, he held opposing batters to a slash line of .172/.368/.207.

In 2025 with the Rockies, before he was traded, Bird posted a 4–1 record with a 4.73 ERA and 65 strikeouts in 53 1/3 innings pitched over 45 games.

=== New York Yankees ===
On July 31, 2025, the Rockies traded Bird to the New York Yankees in exchange for Roc Riggio and Ben Shields. After struggling in three outings, giving up a grand slam in a loss to the Miami Marlins and a walk-off home run to the Texas Rangers, the Yankees demoted Bird to the Triple-A Scranton/Wilkes-Barre RailRiders on August 5. He did not return to the majors, posting a 27.00 ERA with New York and a 6.32 ERA in Triple-A.

In 2026, Bird was named to New York's Opening Day roster. He made 36 relief appearances for the Yankees and had a 1–1 record, a 5.93 ERA, and 31 strikeouts across 30 1/3 innings.

=== Washington Nationals ===
On August 2, 2026, the Yankees traded Bird, Yovanny Cruz, Ben Grable, and Jack Cebert to the Washington Nationals in exchange for Luis García Jr. He was optioned to the Triple-A Rochester Red Wings and was recalled by the Nationals for the first time on August 9. Bird made eight relief appearances with Washington and had a 3.24 ERA and 10 strikeouts over 8 1/3 innings.

== Pitching repertoire ==
Bird is a ground ball pitcher with a low-slot, sidearm delivery. His sinker, which he throws 50% of the time, averages 95 mph and has significant tailing action, inducing ground balls. He also throws a 91 mph cutter. Beginning in 2024, he began throwing these two fastballs less frequently in favor of his 85 mph slider and 81 mph changeup. He changed his slider movement to a sweeper in 2024. He said his pitches generally moved less when pitching at Coors Field.

== Personal life ==
Bird has three brothers. Their father also attended UCLA.

In 2020, Bird began playing an electronic keyboard that his mother, a teacher, had brought home from school. After pitching in home games, Bird plays the keyboard to decompress.

When Bird was promoted to the majors with the Rockies in 2022, he was roommates with battery-mate Brian Serven. The following year, he lived in a Denver hotel.

== See also ==
- List of Jewish Major League Baseball players
- List of Jews in Sports
