= Ground ball pitcher =

Type of pitcher in baseball

In baseball, a ground ball pitcher (also ground-ball pitcher or groundball pitcher) is a type of pitcher who has a tendency to induce ground balls from opposing batters. The average ground ball pitcher has a ground ball rate of at least 50%, with extreme ground ball pitchers maintaining a ground ball rate of around 55%. Pitchers with a ground ball rate lower than 50% may be classified as flyball pitchers or as pitchers who exhibit the tendencies of both ground ball and fly ball pitchers. Ground ball pitchers rely on pitches that are low in the strike zone with substantial downward movement, such as splitters and sinker balls.

Most baseball analysts, such as sabermetrician Tom Tango, agree that ground ball pitchers are generally better pitchers than those with fly ball tendencies. Meanwhile, baseball writer and analyst Bill James argues the opposite because of injury patterns among ground ball pitchers.

== Batted ball tendencies ==
Against a ground ball pitcher, batters tend to ground out rather than fly out. A ground ball pitcher’s ability to keep balls in the infield in turn keeps balls from resulting in home runs which, according to Hardball Times writer David Gassko, is the strongest benefit of a ground ball pitcher. When a ground ball pitcher does allow a pitch to be hit into the air, it is likely to result in a line drive.

Compared to fly ball pitchers, ground ball pitchers generally allow fewer extra base hits yet more total hits. Likewise, ground ball pitchers tend to give up fewer home runs than fly ball pitchers.
Ground ball pitchers tend to perform better against ground ball hitters than they perform against fly ball hitters.

=== Relationship with defense ===
Compared to fly ball pitchers, ground ball pitchers are more likely to allow unearned runs. David Gassko notes that 2.23% of ground balls result in an error, and these errors account for 85% of all errors. Accordingly, as Gassko argues, the susceptibility of ground balls to errors results in more unearned runs.

With runners on base, ground ball pitchers often force double plays because the weak contact batters make with a ground ball pitcher’s pitches prevents the ball from passing the infield defense.

=== Ground ball rate ===
Ground ball rate, or ground ball percentage, is the percentage of batted balls that are hit as ground balls against a pitcher. A typical ground ball pitcher has a ground ball rate over 50% while an extreme ground ball pitcher maintains a ground ball rate of 55% or higher. Pitchers with high ground ball rates sustain lower BABIP, or Batting Average against Balls in Play (Hardball), on ground balls than those with low ground ball rates.

== Nature of pitches ==
Ground ball pitchers rely on pitches that are likely to induce weak contact from the batter, thus resulting in a ground ball. Pitches that are low in the strike zone with high negative horizontal or vertical movement and high velocity, such as splitters, sinkers, curveballs, and two-seam fastballs, result in the highest percentage of ground balls. According to data from the 2012 major league season, splitters and sinker balls result in the highest percentages of ground balls compared to other pitches, with 50.3% and 49.8%, respectively.

=== Sinker ball ===
The sinker ball has an ability to “dive” at the plate, often resulting in ground balls. Several ground ball pitchers such as Tim Hudson, Greg Maddux, Derek Lowe, Chien-Ming Wang, Brandon Webb, and Jake Westbrook rely heavily on their sinker pitches and may often be considered sinkerballers. Self-proclaimed ground ball pitcher Zach Day has indicated that his primary pitch is a sinker ball as well.

Tim Hudson notes that he transformed from a strikeout pitcher to a ground ball pitcher because of the capabilities of his sinker ball. He also notes that he feels double plays are easy to force with a ground ball.
As of 1998, 72% of balls put in play against Greg Maddux resulted in ground balls, who often relies on a sinker ball. In June 2002, Lowe allowed eleven fly balls to 129 batters, relying on his sinker to induce ground balls. According to a scouting report by Lewis Shaw, Brandon Webb’s sinker possesses heavy downward movement and high velocity, and one of his notable tendencies is to induce ground balls from right-handed hitters.

== Ground ball pitching performances ==
=== 1996 World Series ===
In a World Series game on October 21, 1996, against the New York Yankees, then-Atlanta Braves pitcher Greg Maddux pitched one fly ball and eighteen ground balls, earning nineteen of twenty-four outs on ground balls with Wade Boggs grounding into a double play. Yankees catcher Joe Girardi said of Maddux's performance, "[H]e has a great sinker and he gets a lot of ground balls." Braves center fielder Marquis Grissom noted, "He [Maddux] works fast. His games are not boring, by no means. That's his style of pitching. He's a ground ball pitcher."

Baseball writer Murray Chass noted the similarities between this World Series game and a World Series game Maddux pitched against the Cleveland Indians a year prior, which resulted in a loss by the Indians, who scored two unearned runs. In this game, Maddux earned nineteen ground outs and pitched two fly balls.

=== 2007 ALCS ===
In game three of the American League Championship Series between the Cleveland Indians and Boston Red Sox in 2007, Indians pitcher Jake Westbrook used his sinker ball to induce fifteen ground ball outs and also forced two 6-4-3 double plays.

== Notable pitchers ==
- Aaron Cook
- Roy Halladay
- Félix Hernández
- Tim Hudson
- Greg Maddux
- Derek Lowe
- Chien-Ming Wang
- Brandon Webb
- Jake Westbrook
- Jamey Wright
- Orel Hershiser
- Tyler Rogers

== See also ==
- Ground ball fly ball ratio
