= Washington Nationals minor league players =

Minor league players and teams affiliated with the Washington Nationals professional baseball organization include:

== Players ==
=== Yeremy Cabrera ===
Yeremy Cabrera

Washington Nationals
- Outfielder
- Born: July 2, 2005 (age 21); Baní, Dominican Republic
- Bats: Left Throws: Left

Yeremy Augusto Cabrera (born July 2, 2005) is a Dominican professional baseball outfielder in the Washington Nationals organization.

Cabrera signed with the Texas Rangers as an international free agent in January 2022. He made his professional debut that year with the Dominican Summer League Cubs and played with them in 2023. Cabrera played 2024 with the Arizona Complex League Rangers and Down East Wood Ducks and 2025 with the Hickory Crawdads.

On January 22, 2026, the Rangers traded Cabrera, Devin Fitz-Gerald, Gavin Fien, Alejandro Rosario, and Abimelec Ortiz to the Washington Nationals in exchange for MacKenzie Gore. He started the 2026 season with the Fredericksburg Nationals before being promoted to the Wilmington Blue Rocks.

- Career statistics from Baseball Reference (Minors)

=== Jack Cebert ===
Jack Cebert

Washington Nationals
- Pitcher
- Born: April 1, 2002 (age 24); Ocala, Florida, U.S.
- Bats: Right Throws: Right

Jack Lawrence Cebert (born April 1, 2002) is an American professional baseball pitcher in the Washington Nationals organization.

Cebert attended Calvary Christian High School in Clearwater, Florida and played college baseball for the South Florida Bulls for three years and the Texas Tech Red Raiders for one year. He was selected by the New York Yankees in the 15th round of the 2025 Major League Baseball draft.

Cebert made his professional debut with the Hudson Valley Renegades. He started 2026 with Hudson Valley before being promoted to the Somerset Patriots. On August 2, 2026, the Yankees traded Cebert, Yovanny Cruz, Ben Grable, and Jake Bird to the Washington Nationals in exchange for Luis García Jr.

- Career statistics from Baseball Reference (Minors)

=== Ronny Cruz ===
Ronny Cruz

Washington Nationals
- Infielder
- Born: August 24, 2006 (age 20); Santo Domingo, Dominican Republic
- Bats: Right Throws: Right

Ronny Junior Cruz (born August 24, 2006) is a Dominican professional baseball infielder in the Washington Nationals organization.

Cruz was born in the Dominican Republic and moved to the United States where he attended Miami Christian School in Fontainebleau, Florida for two years. He was selected by the Chicago Cubs in the third round of the 2024 Major League Baseball draft. Cruz made his professional debut in 2025 with the Arizona Complex League Cubs.

On July 30, 2025, the Cruz and Christian Franklin to the Washington Nationals in exchange for Michael Soroka. He started the 2026 season with the Fredericksburg Nationals before being promoted to the Wilmington Blue Rocks.

- Career statistics from Baseball Reference (Minors)

=== Luke Dickerson ===
Luke Dickerson

Washington Nationals
- Shortstop
- Born: August 9, 2005 (age 21); Morristown, New Jersey, U.S.
- Bats: Right Throws: Right

Luke Erik Dickerson (born August 9, 2005) is an American professional baseball shortstop in the Washington Nationals organization.

Dickerson attended Morris Knolls High School in Rockaway, New Jersey, where he played on the school's baseball team as a shortstop and on the ice hockey team as a center. As a senior in 2024, Dickerson was named the New Jersey High School Baseball Player of the Year after hitting .467 with 18 home runs, 46 RBI, and 27 stolen bases. His 18 home runs tied the New Jersey single season home run record held by Mike Trout and Ashton Bardzell.

Dickerson was selected by the Washington Nationals in the second round with the 44th overall pick of the 2024 Major League Baseball draft. He signed with the team for $3.8 million, the highest signing bonus ever in the bonus pool era for a player not drafted in the first round, forgoing his commitment to play college baseball at the University of Virginia.

Dickerson made his professional debut in 2025 with the Rookie-level Florida Complex League Nationals and was quickly promoted to the Single-A Fredericksburg Nationals, with whom he played the remainder of the season. Across 89 games played, he batted .208 with six home runs, 41 RBI, and 22 stolen bases. Dickerson was assigned to Fredericksburg to open the 2026 season. In August, he was promoted to the High-A Wilmington Blue Rocks. Dickerson played in 118 games between the two teams and hit .218 with 13 home runs, 54 RBI, and 26 stolen bases.

- Career statistics from Baseball Reference (Minors)

=== Devin Fitz-Gerald ===
Devin Fitz-Gerald

Washington Nationals
- Infielder
- Born: August 17, 2005 (age 21); Boca Raton, Florida, U.S.
- Bats: Switch Throws: Right

Devin Paul Fitz-Gerald (born August 17, 2005) is an American professional baseball infielder in the Washington Nationals organization.

Fitz-Gerald attended Marjory Stoneman Douglas High School in Parkland, Florida. He was selected by the Texas Rangers in the fifth round of the 2024 Major League Baseball draft. He spent his first professional season in 2025 with the Arizona Complex League Rangers and Hickory Crawdads.

On January 22, 2026, the Rangers traded Fitz-Gerald, Gavin Fien, Alejandro Rosario, Yeremy Cabrera, and Abimelec Ortiz to the Washington Nationals in exchange for MacKenzie Gore. He started the 2026 season with the Wilmington Blue Rocks.

- Career statistics from MLB · ESPN · Fangraphs · Baseball Reference (Minors)

=== Phillip Glasser ===
Phillip Glasser

Washington Nationals
- Outfielder
- Born: December 3, 1999 (age 26); Canton, Ohio, U.S.
- Bats: Left Throws: Right

Phillip James Glasser (born December 3, 1999) is an American professional baseball outfielder in the Washington Nationals organization.

Glasser attended Tallmadge High School in Tallmadge, Ohio where he played baseball. After graduating in 2018, he played three seasons of college baseball at Youngstown State University for the Penguins. After the 2021 season, he transferred to Indiana University where he played two seasons for the Indiana Hoosiers. As a redshirt senior for the Hoosiers in 2023, Glasser played in 63 games and hit .357 with seven home runs, 48 RBI, and 14 stolen bases. After the season, he was selected by the Washington Nationals in the tenth round of the 2023 Major League Baseball draft. He signed with the team for $20,000.

Glasser made his professional debut after signing with the Florida Complex League Nationals and also played with the Fredericksburg Nationals, hitting .310 across 18 games. Glasser returned to Fredericksburg to open the 2024 season. He was promoted to the Wilmington Blue Rocks and Harrisburg Senators during the season. Over 108 games between the three teams, Glasser batted .298 with eight home runs, 48 RBI, and 23 stolen bases. He was assigned back to Harrisburg to open the 2025 season and was promoted to the Rochester Red Wings in September. Glasser played in 124 games with both clubs and hit .302 with seven home runs, 49 RBI, and 32 stolen bases. The Nationals named him their Minor League Hitter of the Year. Glasser returned to Rochester for the 2026 season and batted .271 with two home runs and 44 RBI over 107 games.

- Career statistics from Baseball Reference (Minors)
- Youngstown State Penguins bio
- Indiana Hoosiers bio

=== Joe Glassey ===
Joe Glassey

Washington Nationals
- Relief pitcher
- Born: July 17, 2001 (age 25); Park Ridge, Illinois, U.S.
- Bats: Right Throws: Right

Joseph Robert Glassey (born July 17, 2001) is an American professional baseball pitcher in the Washington Nationals organization.

Glassey played five years of college baseball at the University of Illinois. He signed with the Baltimore Orioles as an undrafted free agent in 2024.

Glassey was promoted to the Class-AA Chesapeake Baysox for the first time in late July 2026. Days later, the Orioles traded Glassey to the Washington Nationals for outfielder Christian Franklin in a swap of prospects. After not allowing a run with the Class-AA Harrisburg Senators as a member of the Nationals organization, Glassey was promoted to the Class-AAA Rochester Red Wings in September 2026.

- Career statistics from Baseball Reference (Minors)
- Illinois Fighting Illini bio

=== Ben Grable ===
Ben Grable

Washington Nationals
- Pitcher
- Born: May 3, 2002 (age 24); Pasadena, California, U.S.
- Bats: Right Throws: Right

Bennett Joseph Grable (born May 3, 2002) is an American professional baseball pitcher in the Washington Nationals organization.

Grable attended Flintridge Preparatory School in La Cañada Flintridge, California. He played college baseball for two years at Northwestern University and one year at Indiana University Bloomington. In 2023, he played collegiate summer baseball with the Cotuit Kettleers of the Cape Cod Baseball League. He was selected by the New York Yankees in the 11th round of the 2025 Major League Baseball draft.

Grable made his professional debut in 2026 with the Hudson Valley Renegades before being promoted to the Somerset Patriots. On August 2, 2026, the Yankees traded Grable, Jake Bird, Yovanny Cruz, and Jack Cebert to the Washington Nationals in exchange for Luis García Jr.

- Career statistics from Baseball Reference (Minors)

=== Landon Harmon ===
Landon Harmon

Washington Nationals
- Pitcher
- Born: September 9, 2006 (age 20); Southaven, Mississippi, U.S.
- Bats: Right Throws: Right

Landon Graham Harmon (born September 9, 2006) is an American professional baseball pitcher in the Washington Nationals organization.

Harmon attended East Union High School in Blue Springs, Mississippi. As a senior in 2025, he had a 12–1 win-loss record with a 0.84 earned run average (ERA) and 131 strikeouts. He was selected by the Washington Nationals in the third round of the 2025 Major League Baseball draft. He signed with the team for $2.5 million, forgoing his commitment to play college baseball at Mississippi State University.

Harmon made his professional debut in 2026 with the Single-A Fredericksburg Nationals. He missed over two months during the season due to a left oblique strain. Harmon appeared in 13 games (12 starts) with Fredericksburg and had a 1–1 record, a 1.76 ERA, and 39 strikeouts over 41 innings pitched.

- Career statistics from Baseball Reference (Minors)

=== Jhancarlos Lara ===
Jhancarlos Lara

Washington Nationals
- Pitcher
- Born: January 15, 2003 (age 23); San Cristóbal, Dominican Republic
- Bats: Right Throws: Right

Jhancarlos Lara (born January 15, 2003) is a Dominican professional baseball pitcher in the Washington Nationals organization. He is currently a phantom ballplayer, having spent three days on the Atlanta Braves' active roster without making an appearance.

On June 7, 2021, Lara signed with the Atlanta Braves as an international free agent. He made his professional debut with the Dominican Summer League Braves.

Lara split the 2023 campaign between the Single-A Augusta GreenJackets and the High-A Rome Braves, accumulating a 4–8 record and 4.09 ERA with 114 strikeouts across 20 appearances.

Lara started the 2024 campaign with Rome before being promoted to the Mississippi Braves. In 20 combined appearances, Lara compiled a 2–4 record and 3.92 ERA with 94 strikeouts across 82 2/3 innings of work.

To begin the 2025 season, Lara was assigned to the Double-A Columbus Clingstones. On May 13, 2025, he was promoted to the Triple-A Gwinnett Stripers. On September 19, Lara was selected to the 40-man roster and promoted to the major leagues for the first time. He went unused out of the bullpen and was optioned back to Gwinnett on September 22, becoming a phantom ballplayer.

Lara was optioned to Triple-A Gwinnett to begin the 2026 season. In his first 15 appearances for the Stripers, he struggled to a 8.22 ERA with 21 strikeouts across 15 1/3 innings pitched. On June 10, 2026, Lara was designated for assignment by the Braves.

On June 12, 2026, Lara was claimed off of waivers by the Washington Nationals. He was designated for assignment by the Nationals on June 24. Lara cleared waivers and was sent outright to the Double-A Harrisburg Senators on June 29. In 21 games with Double-A Harrisburg Senators he threw 23.1 innings of relief going 2-2 with a 4.63 ERA with 38 strikeouts and one save.

- Career statistics from Baseball Reference (Minors)

=== Sam Petersen ===
Sam Petersen

Washington Nationals
- Outfielder
- Born: January 20, 2003 (age 23); Ankeny, Iowa, U.S.
- Bats: Right Throws: Right

Samuel Matthew Petersen (born January 20, 2003) is an American professional baseball outfielder in the Washington Nationals organization.

Petersen attended Ballard High School in Huxley, Iowa and played college baseball at the University of Iowa. In 2023, he played collegiate summer baseball with the Bourne Braves of the Cape Cod Baseball League. He was selected by the Washington Nationals in the eighth round of the 2024 Major League Baseball draft.

Petersen made his professional debut in 2024 with the Fredericksburg Nationals. He played 2025 with the Florida Complex League Nationals, Fredericksburg and the Wilmington Blue Rocks. After the season, he played in the Arizona Fall League. Petersen started 2026 with the Harrisburg Senators.

- Career statistics from Baseball Reference (Minors)

=== Holden Powell ===
Holden Powell

Washington Nationals
- Relief pitcher
- Born: September 9, 1999 (age 27); Visalia, California, U.S.
- Bats: Right Throws: Right

Holden William Powell (born September 9, 1999) is an American professional baseball relief pitcher in the Washington Nationals organization.

Powell played for the Bruins at the University of California, Los Angeles, where he served as the team's primary closer in 2019 and 2020. In 2019, he briefly played collegiate summer baseball with the Cotuit Kettleers of the Cape Cod Baseball League. He was drafted in the third round by the Nationals in the abbreviated 2020 draft and chose to sign with the team, appearing later that summer in instructional league in Florida.

Before the 2021 season, Powell ranked as the Nationals' 20th-best prospect, according to MLB Pipeline. He was assigned to High-A Wilmington, along with several other top Nationals prospects, to begin the season that May.

Powell employs a fastball and a slider as his main pitches. He uses a changeup and a curveball less frequently, relying on the slider as his primary "out pitch" while working up to 97 miles per hour (156 km/h) with his fastball.

- Career statistics from Baseball Reference (Minors)
- UCLA Bruins bio

=== Alejandro Rosario ===
Alejandro Rosario

Washington Nationals
- Pitcher
- Born: January 6, 2002 (age 24); Miami, Florida, U.S.
- Bats: Right Throws: Right
Medals
Men's baseball
Representing United States
18U Baseball World Cup
Silver medal – second place	2019 Gijang	Team

Alejandro Antonio Rosario (born January 6, 2002) is an American professional baseball pitcher for the Washington Nationals of Major League Baseball (MLB).

Rosario attended Miami Christian School in Fontainebleau, Florida. Rosario produced a 13–3 record with a 1.67 ERA and 165 strikeouts over 142 2/3 innings in his high school career. He helped pitch Miami Christian to the Class 2A-8 championship in 2019. Rosario was part of Team USA three times in high school. He was on the 2017 15U National Team, in the 2017 17U National Team Development Program, and on the 2019 18U National Team. He made three appearances in the 2019 WBSC U-18 Baseball World Cup, earning a silver medal.

Undrafted out of high school, he attended the University of Miami to play college baseball. He went 6–4 with a 5.21 ERA and 55 strikeouts over 65 2/3 innings in 2021. In 2022, he went 2–3 with a 7.05 ERA and 52 strikeouts over 60 innings. Rosario played for the Hyannis Harbor Hawks of the Cape Cod Baseball League in the summer of 2022. He posted a 5–6 record with a 7.11 ERA and 91 strikeouts over 74 2/3 innings in 2024. Rosario was drafted by the Texas Rangers in the 5th round of the 2023 MLB draft.

Rosario did not appear in a professional game in 2023 after signing. Instead, he was focused on reworking his mechanics and repertoire for the upcoming season by Texas. He opened the 2024 season with the Down East Wood Ducks of the Low-A Carolina League, going 2–3 with a 2.11 ERA and 69 strikeouts over 47 innings. He was promoted at the end of June to the Hickory Crawdads of the High-A South Atlantic League.

Rosario continued to work through the minor leagues in 2024. On September 3, 2024, he earned a promotion to Double-A Frisco of the Double-A Texas League. In High-A, he continued to dominate hitters, posting a record of 2-2, and recording an ERA of 2.40 over eight games (seven starts) in a combined 41⅓ innings with a strikeout-to-walk ratio of 60–8.

On February 23, 2025, it was announced that Rosario was likely to miss the entirety of the 2025 season due to an elbow injury that necessitated surgery. Rosario did not undergo surgery during 2025, reportedly due to an unrelated medical issue.

Rosario was traded to the Washington Nationals in a six-player deal that brought MacKenzie Gore to Texas on January 22, 2026. After acquiring Rosario, Nationals President of Baseball Operations Paul Toboni disclosed that Rosario would undergo Tommy John surgery.

After missing the 2026 season, Rosario was selected to the Nationals' 40-man roster for the first time on November 17, 2026, protecting him from potential selection in the Rule 5 draft.

- Career statistics from MLB · Baseball Reference (Minors)
- Miami Hurricanes bio

=== Tyler Stuart ===
Tyler Stuart

Washington Nationals
- Pitcher
- Born: October 8, 1999 (age 27); Kankakee, Illinois, U.S.
- Bats: Right Throws: Right

Tyler Matthew Stuart (born October 8, 1999) is an American professional baseball pitcher in the Washington Nationals organization.

Stuart attended Herscher High School in Herscher, Illinois, where he played baseball, basketball and football. As a senior in 2018, he went 10–1 with a 1.06 ERA and 117 strikeouts alongside a .466 batting average. He was not selected in the 2018 Major League Baseball draft and enrolled at the University of Southern Mississippi where he played college baseball.

Stuart did not appear in any games for Southern Mississippi in 2019 or 2020. He made his collegiate debut in 2021, pitching to a 7.16 ERA over 16 1/3 innings. In 2021, he played collegiate summer baseball with the Bourne Braves of the Cape Cod Baseball League, throwing six scoreless innings. For the 2022 season, Stuart appeared in 22 games (four starts) and went 4–0 with a 3.38 ERA over forty innings. After the season, he was selected by the New York Mets in the sixth round of the 2022 Major League Baseball draft.

Stuart signed with the Mets and made his professional debut in 2022 with the Florida Complex League Mets and St. Lucie Mets, pitching 3 2/3 innings between the two teams. He opened the 2023 season with the Brooklyn Cyclones and was promoted to the Binghamton Rumble Ponies in mid-July. Over 21 starts between the two teams, Stuart went 7–2 with a 2.20 ERA and 112 strikeouts over 110 2/3 innings. He was assigned to Binghamton to open the 2024 season.

On July 28, 2024, the Mets traded Stuart to the Washington Nationals in exchange for Jesse Winker. He was assigned to the Harrisburg Senators and promoted to the Rochester Red Wings near the season's end. Over 25 starts between the three teams for the season, Stuart went 4–8 with a 4.12 ERA and 135 strikeouts over 122 1/3 innings. Stuart opened the 2025 season on the injured list with an elbow injury before returning for a rehab assignment in June. For the 2025 season, he made ten appearances between the Florida Complex League Nationals, the Wilmington Blue Rocks, and Harrisburg, going 2–2 with a 4.29 ERA over 35 2/3 innings. In July, he was placed back on the injured list, and shortly after underwent Tommy John surgery, ending his season.

- Career statistics from Baseball Reference (Minors)
- Southern Miss bio

=== Jarlín Susana ===
Jarlín Susana

Washington Nationals – No. 49
- Pitcher
- Born: March 23, 2004 (age 22); Villa Isabela, Dominican Republic
- Bats: Right Throws: Right

Jarlín Joel Susana (born March 23, 2004) is a Dominican professional baseball pitcher for the Washington Nationals of Major League Baseball (MLB).

Susana signed with the San Diego Padres as an international free agent on January 15, 2022. He made his professional debut that year with the Arizona Complex League Padres.

On August 2, 2022, Susana, along with MacKenzie Gore, Luke Voit, Robert Hassell, James Wood, and C. J. Abrams were traded to the Washington Nationals in exchange for Juan Soto and Josh Bell. He started his Nationals career with the Florida Complex League Nationals and was promoted to the Fredericksburg Nationals after two starts.

On May 11, 2025, Susana was diagnosed with a Grade 1 UCL sprain. Upon returning, he made 14 starts for the High-A Wilmington Blue Rocks and Double-A Harrisburg Senators; in those games, he compiled a 1-4 record and 3.51 ERA with 95 strikeouts across 56 1/3 innings pitched. On September 15, it was announced that Susana would miss the remainder of the season after undergoing lat surgery.

Susana returned to action late in the 2026 season, finishing the regular season with the Triple-A Rochester Red Wings and pitching two scoreless innings for Rochester in the Triple-A championship game versus the Oklahoma City Comets, recording pitch speeds up to 104 miles per hour (167 km/h). Susana represented the Nationals in the Arizona Fall League, pitching for the Salt River Rafters. He was named the Arizona Fall League Pitcher of the Year after holding batters to a .162 average while striking out 26 in 18 2/3 innings.

The Nationals selected Susana's contract on November 17, 2026, adding him to the 40-man roster for the first time.

- Career statistics from Baseball Reference (Minors)

=== Eriq Swan ===
Eriq Swan

Washington Nationals
- Pitcher
- Born: October 31, 2001 (age 25); Marietta, Georgia, U.S.
- Bats: Right Throws: Right

Eriq Stanford Swan (born October 31, 2001) is an American professional baseball pitcher in the Washington Nationals organization.

A native of Marietta, Georgia, Swan played college baseball at Middle Tennessee State University. In 2022, he played collegiate summer baseball with the Wareham Gatemen of the Cape Cod Baseball League. Swan was drafted by the Los Angeles Dodgers in the 4th round of the 2023 MLB draft. He made his professional debut the following season with the Arizona Complex League Dodgers before a quick promotion to the Rancho Cucamonga Quakes, and he had a 5.16 ERA in 10 games (seven starts) between the two levels. In 2025 with the Great Lakes Loons he had a 4–3 record and 4.43 ERA in 16 games (14 starts) while striking out 77 batters.

On July 31, 2025, the Dodgers traded Swan and Sean Paul Liñan to the Washington Nationals in exchange for Alex Call.

- Career statistics from Baseball Reference (Minors)

== Team rosters, by league ==
Below are the rosters of the minor league affiliates of the Washington Nationals:

=== Triple-A ===
Rochester Red Wings roster
Players		Coaches/Other
Pitchers: 26 Jack Cebert; 38 Joe Glassey; 21 Ben Grable; 22 Cole Henry *; 40 Isaac Lyon; 46 Wyatt Mills *	Catchers: 4 Maxwell Romero Jr.; Infielders: 1 Phillip Glasser; 5 Seaver King; 22 Cortland Lawson; 7 Trey Lipscomb; 14 Cayden Wallace; Outfielders: 25 Sam Petersen; 3 Johnathon Thomas	Manager: 45 Matthew LeCroy; Coaches: 51 Brian Daubach (hitting); 31 Anthony Deleo (quality control); 27 Travis Fitta (assistant hitting); 18 Mario Lisson (defensive); 43 Sam Narron (assistant pitching); 38 Fernando Nieve (pitching); 7-day injured list; * On Washington Nationals 40-man roster; ~ Development list; # Rehab assignment; ∞ Reserve list; ‡ Restricted list; § Suspended list; † Temporarily inactive list; Roster updated November 17, 2026; Transactions; → More rosters: MiLB • International League; → Washington Nationals minor league players

=== Double-A ===
Harrisburg Senators roster
Players		Coaches/Other
Pitchers: 4 Alex Clemmey; 47 Robert Cranz; -- Noah Dean; -- Davian Garcia; -- Chase Hampton *; 35 Josh Hartle; 9 Jhancarlos Lara; 44 Kyle Luckham; 40 Josh Randall; 22 Thomas Schultz; -- Tyler Stuart; 35 Eriq Swan; -- Dylan Tebrake; 36 Yoel Tejeda Jr.; 31 Kendeglys Virguez; 13 Luke Young	Catchers: 29 Kevin Bazzell; 15 Caleb Lomavita; 37 Caleb Farmer; 18 Edgardo Figueroa; Infielders: 8 Branden Boissiere; 25 Sam Brown; 3 Devin Fitz-Gerald; 6 Eli Willits; Outfielders: 11 Elijah Green; 34 Nick Mitchell; 20 Ethan Petry; 23 T.J. White	Manager: 26 Delino DeShields; Coaches: 46 Rigo Beltrán (pitching); 41 Darin Everson (hitting); 36 JT Heenan (coach); 39 Pete Horner (assistant pitching); 2 Nik McClaughry (defensive); 7-day injured list; * On Washington Nationals 40-man roster; ~ Development list; # Rehab assignment; ∞ Reserve list; ‡ Restricted list; § Suspended list; † Temporarily inactive list; Roster updated November 17, 2026; Transactions; → More rosters: MiLB • Eastern League; → Washington Nationals minor league players

=== High-A ===
Wilmington Blue Rocks roster
Players		Coaches/Other
Pitchers: 25 Austin Amaral; 39 Merrick Baldo; 47 Tucker Biven; -- Adam Bloebaum; -- Gavin Bruni; 13 Jackson Dannelley; 10 Carson Fischer; 26 Brady Hill; 24 Gus Hughes; 35 Chance Huff; 23 Riley Maddox; 48 Grant Manning; 22 Bryan Polanco; 29 Jacob Roberts; 27 R.J. Sales; 45 Miguel Sime Jr.; 34 Baron Stuart; 41 Liam Sullivan; 38 Mikey Tepper	Catchers Infielders: 12 Ronny Cruz; 3 Luke Dickerson; 15 Angel Feliz; 6 Chris Hacopian; 9 Jacob Walsh; Outfielders: 17 Teo Banks; 1 Yeremy Cabrera; 40 Jack Moroknek; 8 Jorgelys Mota; 11 Elijah Nunez	Manager: 7 Ted Tom; Coaches: 4 Mitchell Boe (defensive); 30 Hudson Byorick (hitting); 31 Niko Leontarakis (assistant pitching); 43 Justin Lord (pitching); 40 Jefferson Valladares (coach); 7-day injured list; * On Washington Nationals 40-man roster; ~ Development list; # Rehab assignment; ∞ Reserve list; ‡ Restricted list; § Suspended list; † Temporarily inactive list; Roster updated November 13, 2026; Transactions; → More rosters: MiLB • South Atlantic League; → Washington Nationals minor league players

=== Single-A ===
Fredericksburg Nationals roster
Players		Coaches/Other
Pitchers: 38 Merritt Beeker; 29 Cooper Carlgren; 41 Leodarlyn Colon; -- Jonah Conradt; 33 Marlon De La Cruz; 18 Landon Harmon; 43 Cody Howard; 31 Levi Huesman; -- Nolan Hughes; 10 Kaleb Kantola; 25 Zack Konstantinovsky; 26 Alexander Meckley; 37 Noah Millikan; 27 Ryan Minckler; 14 Trevor Moore; -- Bryant Olson; 40 Tyler Papenbrock; 22 Leuris Portorreal; -- Owen Puk; 19 Juan Reyes; 12 Cesar Rojas; 15 L.J. Waco; 32 Jacob Weaver	Catchers: 17 Cashel Dugger; 8 Christian Fagnant; -- Nick Hollifield; 23 Sir Jamison Jones; Infielders: 5 Manuel Cabrera; 24 Juan Cruz; 28 Hunter Hines; 7 Coy James; 2 Avery Ortiz; 16 Rafael Ramirez Jr.; Outfielders: 11 Gavin Fien; 13 Elian Soto; 9 Dashyll Tejeda; 20 Cristhian Vaquero; 1 Jordan Williams	Manager: 4 Chris O'Neill; Coaches: 39 Luke Dziados (pitching); 35 Isaac Kim (coach); 6 Anthony Ray (defensive); 51 Jake Scheiner (hitting); 36 Luis Villanueva (assistant pitching); 7-day injured list; * On Washington Nationals 40-man roster; ~ Development list; # Rehab assignment; ∞ Reserve list; ‡ Restricted list; § Suspended list; † Temporarily inactive list; Roster updated November 2, 2026; Transactions; → More rosters: MiLB • Carolina League; → Washington Nationals minor league players

=== Rookie ===
Florida Complex League Nationals roster
Players		Coaches/Other
Pitchers: -- Cooper Allen; -- Cirian Caughey; -- Julio Chivilli; 30 Brenner Cox; -- Matthew Dallas; 56 Jose Feliz; 54 Brock Gillis; -- Max Hansmann; -- Cooper Harris; 64 Darrel Lunar; 74 Maximin Medina; 41 Henry Moreno; -- Weston Moss; -- Tony Neubeck; -- Tyler Papenbrock; -- Gage Peterson; 59 Jean Robles; -- Bennett Roemer; -- Anson Seibert; -- Miles Smith; 61 Yaiker Torrelles	Catchers: 23 Daniel Hernandez; -- Francisco Rivero ‡; 14 Feldi Tavarez; Infielders: 24 Luis Arias; 2 Brayan Cortesia; -- Daniel Cuvet; 9 Marconi German; -- Luke Williams; Outfielders: -- Jack Brooks; -- Chase Brunson; 19 Nauris De La Cruz; -- Chris Hacopian; 13 Victor Hurtado; 1 Browm Martinez; 27 Juan Obispo; -- James Smith IV; -- Nick Williams	Manager: 16 Carmelo Jaime; Coaches: 34 Franklin Bravo (pitching); 57 Ender Chávez (hitting); 12 Cayden Phillips (defensive); 24 Dustin Simanek (complex pitching); 7-day injured list; * On Washington Nationals 40-man roster; ~ Development list; # Rehab assignment; ∞ Reserve list; ‡ Restricted list; § Suspended list; † Temporarily inactive list; Roster updated November 11, 2026; Transactions; → More rosters: MiLB • Florida Complex League; → Washington Nationals minor league players

=== Foreign Rookie ===
Dominican Summer League Nationals roster
Players		Coaches/Other
Pitchers: 21 Enmanuel Carela; 36 Jesus Carrasco; 43 Greyson Gimenez; 18 Edinson Hernandez; 39 Anyel Manzueta; 52 Hernan Mejia; 49 Braylin Moreno; -- Santiago Moreno; 27 Christopher Navas; 29 Daniel Nolasco; 6 Amin Ramirez; 15 Darling Reyes; 19 Franniel Reynoso; 54 Josue Rondon; 48 Manuel Ruiz; 20 Jhondel Salas; 40 Ranger Sarit; 19 Aldemaro Sevilla; 50 Jhoan Thomas	Catchers: 10 Junior Castillo; 12 Pedro Guerra; 25 Carlos Mueses; 24 Luis Tarifa; Infielders: 9 Euris Acosta; 2 Rony Bello; 14 Rayniel Lache; 4 Adrian Tusen; 1 Esnaider Vargas; Outfielders: 5 Juan Duran; 3 Jonierbis Garces; 23 Jawel Garcia; 33 Angel Ramirez; 26 Brad Rodriguez; 7 Samil Serrano; 13 Isaias Suarez	Manager: -- Sandy Martinez; Coaches: -- Jeremy Bautista (catching); -- Brenny Escanio (defensive); -- Blaise Martinez (complex pitching); -- Niomar Gomez (assistant pitching); -- Freddy Guzmán (assistant hitting); -- Rafael Ozuna (hitting); -- Feliberto Sanchez (pitching); 7-day injured list; * On Washington Nationals 40-man roster; ~ Development list; # Rehab assignment; ∞ Reserve list; ‡ Restricted list; § Suspended list; † Temporarily inactive list; Roster updated November 2, 2026; Transactions; → More rosters: MiLB • Dominican Summer League; → Washington Nationals minor league players
