= Fly ball pitcher =

Type of pitcher in American baseball

A fly ball pitcher is a type of baseball pitcher who produces an above-average number of fly balls, typically by keeping his fastball high up in the strike zone and relying on late movement to cause the batter to be unable to make solid contact. This designation is constructed around the ground ball fly ball ratio, which measures how frequently a pitcher gets batters out on fly balls versus ground balls.

The downside of a fly ball pitcher is that, in a ballpark where the design tends to favor hitters over pitchers (an example being Yankee Stadium), a fly ball pitcher will tend to give up more home runs, resulting in a higher earned run average.

Examples include pitchers Sid Fernandez, Ted Lilly, Chris Young, Marco Estrada, Shota Imanaga and Dylan Cease.
