= Yovanny Cruz =

Dominican baseball player (born 1999)

Washington Nationals – No. 48
- Pitcher
- Born: August 23, 1999 (age 27); San Francisco de Macoris, Dominican Republic
- Bats: Right Throws: Right

MLB debut
- May 20, 2026, for the New York Yankees

MLB statistics (through 2026 season)
- Win–loss record: 0–2
- Earned run average: 5.06
- Strikeouts: 15
- Stats at Baseball Reference

Teams
- New York Yankees (2026); Washington Nationals (2026–present)

Yovanny Cruz (born August 23, 1999) is a Dominican professional baseball pitcher for the Washington Nationals of Major League Baseball (MLB). He has previously played in MLB for the New York Yankees. He made his MLB debut in 2026.

== Career ==
Cruz signed with the Chicago Cubs as an international free agent in August 2016. He played in the Cubs organization until 2023. He spent the 2024 season in the San Diego Padres organization and the 2025 season with the Boston Red Sox.

=== New York Yankees ===
On November 8, 2025, Cruz signed a minor league contract with the New York Yankees. He began the regular season with the Triple-A Scranton/Wilkes-Barre RailRiders, compiling a 5–1 record and 3.00 ERA with 23 strikeouts and one save over 18 innings of work. On May 18, 2026, Cruz was promoted to the major leagues for the first time. He made his MLB debut two days later, pitching two scoreless innings and averaging 99.8 miles per hour (160.6 km/h) with his fastball.

=== Washington Nationals ===
On August 2, 2026, the Yankees traded Cruz, Jake Bird, Ben Grable, and Jack Cebert to the Washington Nationals in exchange for Luis García Jr.
