= Gavin Fien =

American baseball player (born 2007)

Washington Nationals
- Third baseman
- Born: March 8, 2007 (age 19); Temecula, California, U.S.
- Bats: Right Throws: Right

Gavin Michael Fien (born March 8, 2007) is an American professional baseball third baseman in the Washington Nationals organization.

== Career ==
=== Amateur career ===
Fien attended Great Oak High School in Temecula, California. In Summer 2024, he played with the USA Baseball's 18U National Team. He also played in the 2024 High School All-American Game where he won the MLB Develops MVP Award.

=== Texas Rangers ===
Fien was a top prospect for the 2025 Major League Baseball draft. Fien was selected 12th overall in the first round of the 2025 Major League Baseball draft by the Texas Rangers. He signed with Texas for a $4.8 million signing bonus on July 21, 2025. Fien spent his professional season with the Single-A Hickory Crawdads; in 10 games for the team, he slashed .220/.267/.341 with seven RBI and one stolen base.

=== Washington Nationals ===
On January 22, 2026, the Rangers traded Fien, Alejandro Rosario, Devin Fitz-Gerald, Yeremy Cabrera, and Abimelec Ortiz to the Washington Nationals in exchange for MacKenzie Gore.
