= MacKenzie Gore =

American baseball player (born 1999)

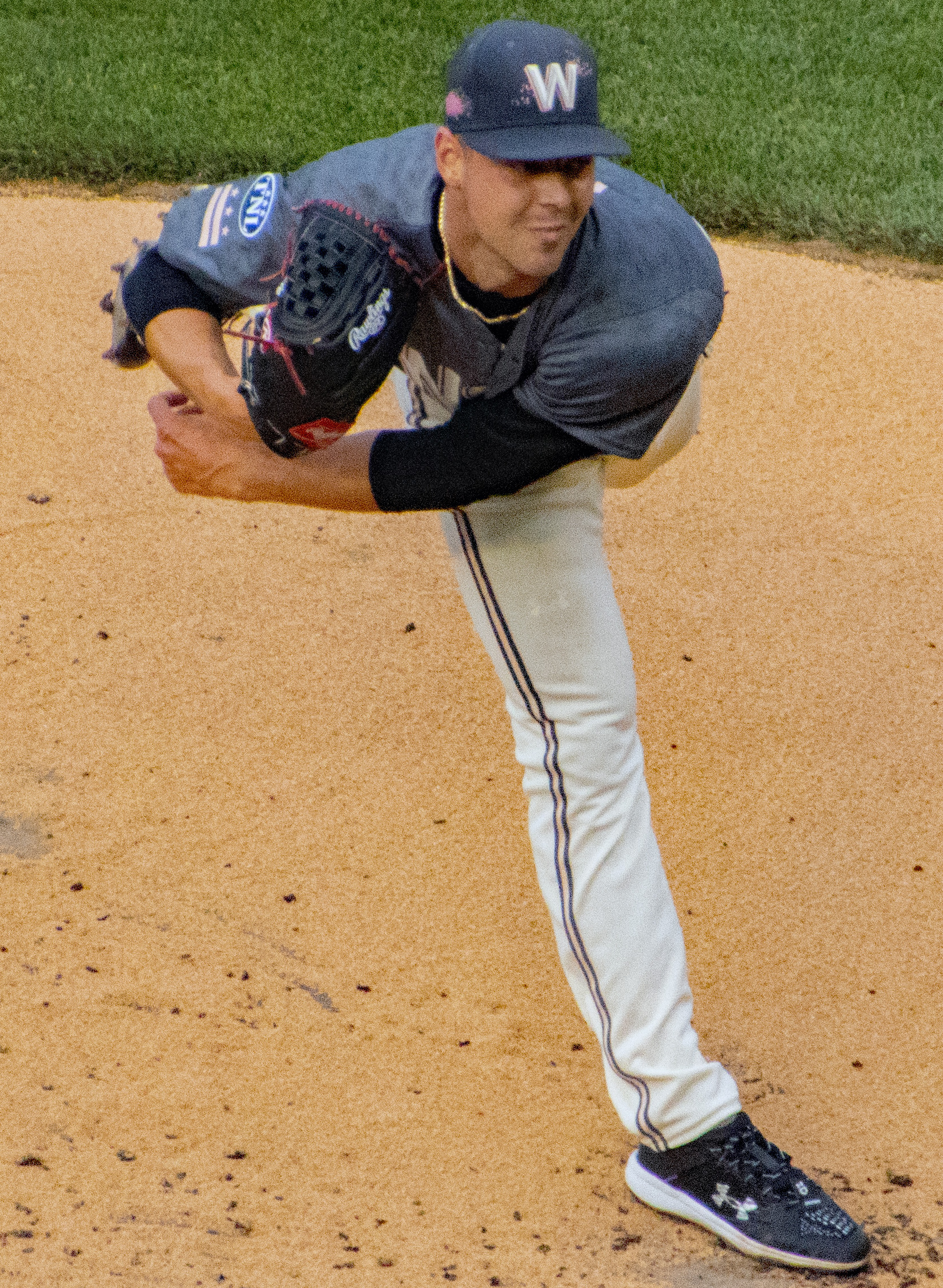
- Gore with the Nationals in 2023

Texas Rangers – No. 1
- Pitcher
- Born: February 24, 1999 (age 27); Wilmington, North Carolina, U.S.
- Bats: Left Throws: Left

MLB debut
- April 15, 2022, for the San Diego Padres

MLB statistics (through 2026 season)
- Win–loss record: 34–52
- Earned run average: 4.29
- Strikeouts: 763
- Stats at Baseball Reference

Teams
- San Diego Padres (2022); Washington Nationals (2023–2025); Texas Rangers (2026–present)

Career highlights and awards
- All-Star (2025)

MacKenzie Evan Gore (born February 24, 1999) is an American professional baseball pitcher for the Texas Rangers of Major League Baseball (MLB). He has previously played in MLB for the San Diego Padres and Washington Nationals. Gore made his MLB debut with the Padres in 2022. In 2025, Gore was named to his first All-Star game.

== Amateur career ==
Gore attended Whiteville High School in Whiteville, North Carolina. As a junior, he was 12–1 with a 0.08 earned run average (ERA) and 174 strikeouts in 88 1/3 innings pitched. During the season, he threw a no-hitter with 18 strikeouts. He led Whiteville to the North Carolina 1A state championship four years in a row, winning three, with Gore being named MVP of all three victories. During the summer 2016, he played in the Perfect Game Classic at Petco Park. Gore committed to the East Carolina University to play college baseball.

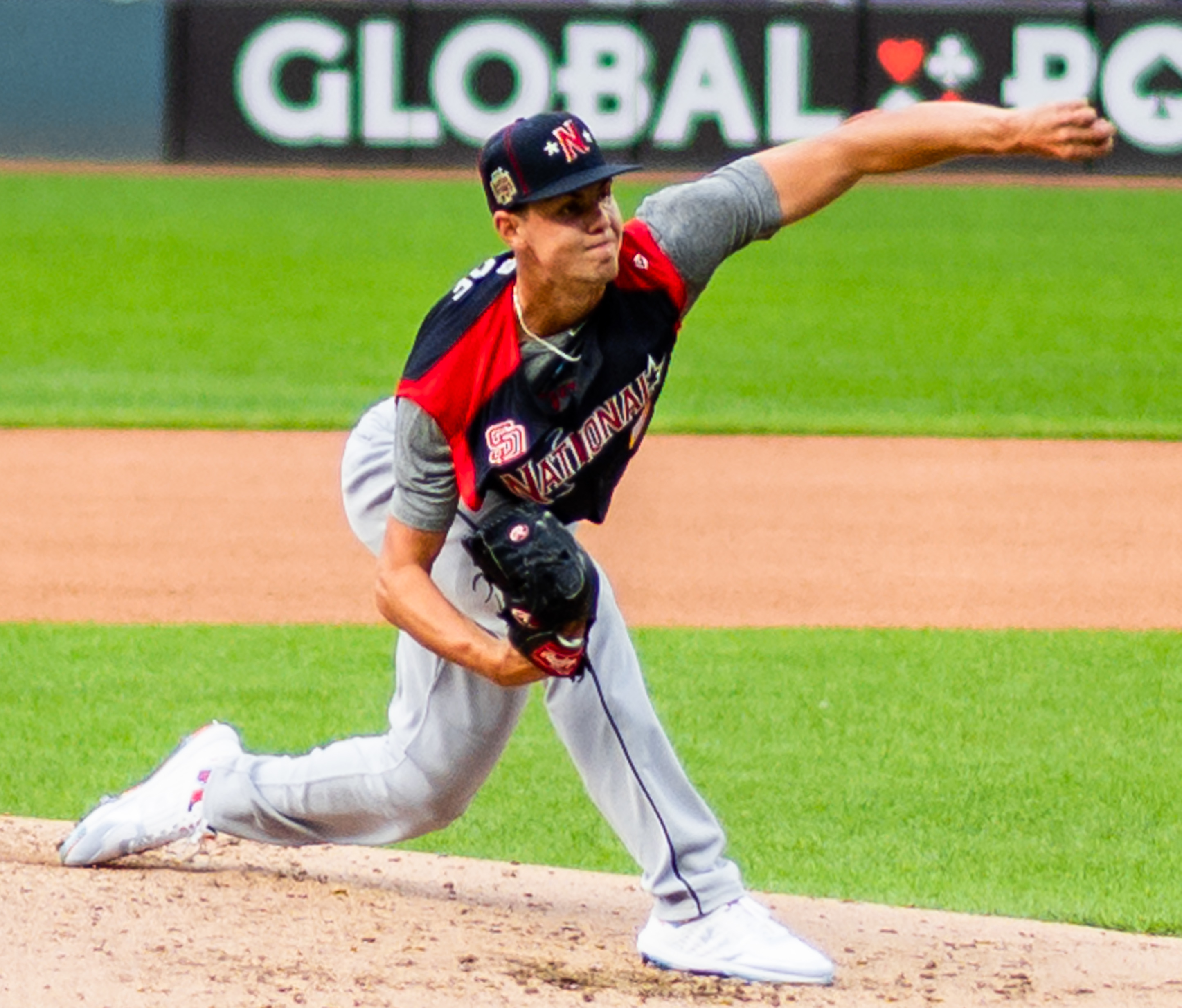
Gore pitching in the 2019 All-Star Futures Game

== Professional career ==
=== San Diego Padres ===
==== Minor leagues ====
Gore was considered one of the top prospects for the 2017 Major League Baseball draft. He was drafted by the San Diego Padres with the third overall pick. He signed a rookie contract on June 23, 2017 and agreed to a signing bonus of $6.7 million. He spent 2017 with the Arizona League Padres where he pitched in seven games, posting a 0–1 record, a 1.27 ERA, and a 0.98 WHIP in seven starts. He spent 2018 with the Fort Wayne TinCaps, going 2–5 with a 4.45 ERA over 16 starts.

Gore began 2019 with the Lake Elsinore Storm, earning California League All-Star honors. That June, he was named to the 2019 All-Star Futures Game. After pitching to a 7–1 record and a 1.02 ERA over 15 starts, striking out 110 batters over 79 1/3 innings, he was promoted to the Amarillo Sod Poodles in early July. He produced a 2–1 record with a 4.15 ERA over 21 2/3 innings for Amarillo.

At the start of 2020, MLB Pipeline rated Gore as the best pitching prospect in minor league baseball and the fifth best prospect overall. He did not play a game in 2020 due to the cancellation of the season caused by the COVID-19 pandemic. Gore began the 2021 season with the El Paso Chihuahuas, but was placed on the injured list after compiling a 5.85 ERA over six starts to go along with a lingering blister and various mechanical issues. Gore made three rehab appearances before he was assigned to the San Antonio Missions with whom he threw eight innings in which he walked nine, struck out 16, and gave up three earned runs. He ended the season being ranked the 56th overall best prospect in baseball and the fourth best left handed pitching prospect. He was assigned to the Peoria Javelinas of the Arizona Fall League after the season. On November 19, 2021, the Padres added Gore to their 40-man roster to protect him from the Rule 5 draft.

==== Major leagues ====
Gore was not part of the Padres Opening Day roster in 2022, starting the season instead with El Paso after the Padres traded for Sean Manaea the weekend before the season started. Gore was called up when Blake Snell was placed on the IL after his first start. Gore made his MLB debut on April 15, 2022, pitching against the defending champion Atlanta Braves. He threw 5 1/3 innings while giving up 3 hits and 2 runs. He recorded his first career strikeout against Braves second baseman Ozzie Albies. He earned his first win on April 20. Gore stayed up with the Padres after Snell and Mike Clevinger rejoined the club, operating out of a temporary six-man rotation that became regular by the end of May. The Padres placed Gore on the 15-day injured list on July 26, due to left elbow inflammation.

=== Washington Nationals ===
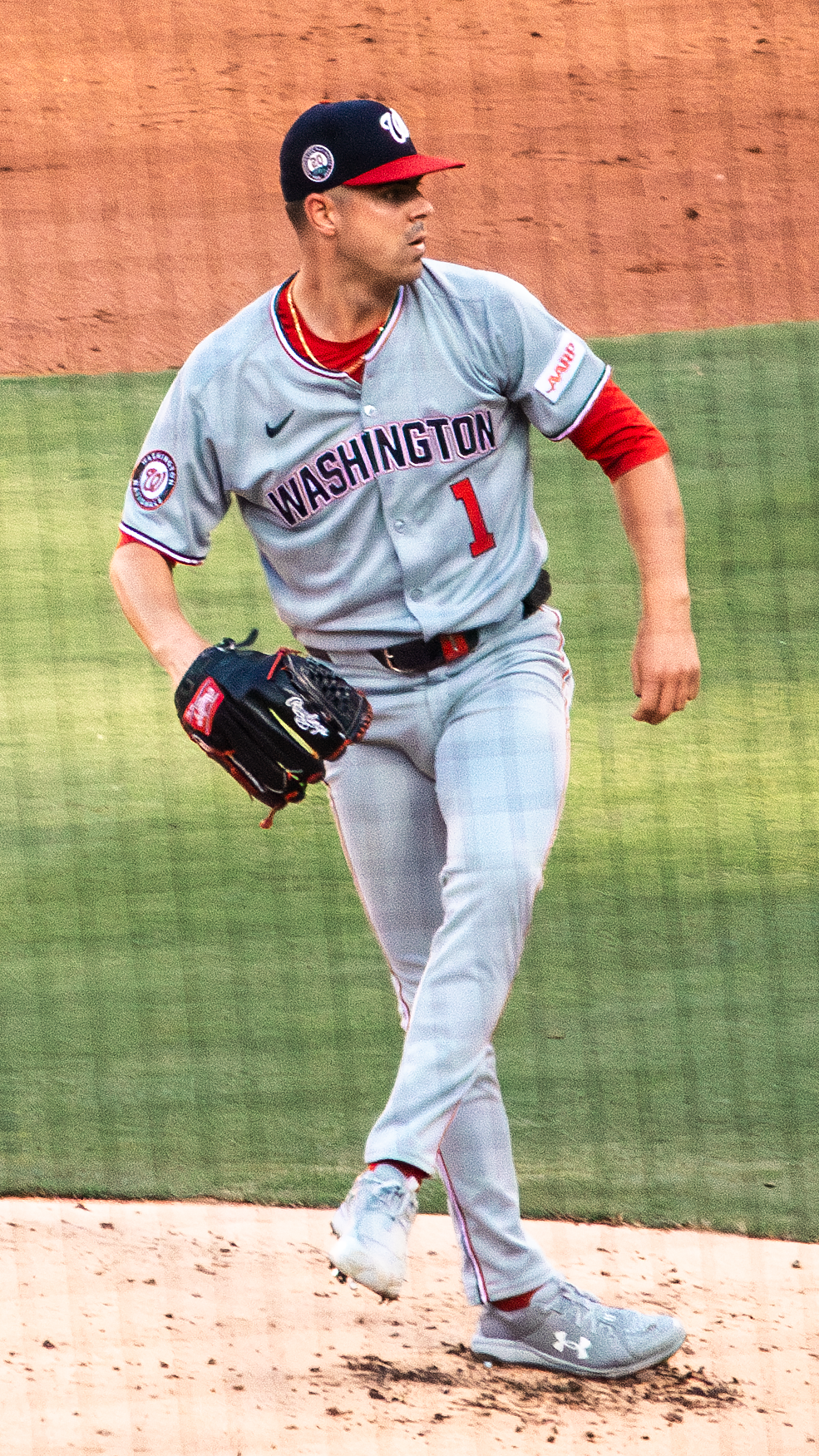
MacKenzie Gore 2025

On August 2, 2022, Gore, along with CJ Abrams, Luke Voit, Robert Hassell III, James Wood, and Jarlín Susana were traded to the Washington Nationals in exchange for Juan Soto and Josh Bell. Gore made rehabilitation starts for the Triple–A Rochester Red Wings, but did not pitch for the Nationals in 2022.

In a June 25, 2023 start against the San Diego Padres, Gore struck out the first six batters he faced, setting a Nationals franchise record. In 2023, Gore had 151 strikeouts and a 4.42 ERA in 136 1/3 innings across 27 starts with a 7–10 record.

In 2024, Gore had 181 strikeouts and a 3.90 ERA in 166 1/3 innings across 32 starts with a 10–12 record.

On March 27, 2025, Gore struck out 13 Philadelphia Phillies, setting the record for the most opening-day strikeouts by a Nationals pitcher. On May 29 against the Seattle Mariners, Gore recorded his 100th strikeout of the season when he struck out Ben Williamson in the bottom of the third inning. In that same game, he became the first pitcher this season to reach 100 strikeouts. Gore, 26, is the third Nationals pitcher in franchise history (2005-present) to become the first in baseball with 100 strikeouts, joining Max Scherzer (2018) and Stephen Strasburg (‘12, ‘14). He also collected his 500th career strikeout in his 84th Major League start. At 26 years and 94 days old, Gore became the 2nd youngest active pitcher with at least 500 career strikeouts. He trails only Hunter Greene, who is 163 days younger. On July 6, Gore was selected to the 2025 Major League Baseball All-Star Game, his first All-Star appearance in MLB. In 30 starts for Washington on the season, he compiled a 5–15 record and 4.17 ERA with 185 strikeouts across 159 2/3 innings pitched. On September 23, Gore was placed on the injured list due to a right ankle impingement, ending his season.

=== Texas Rangers ===
On January 22, 2026, the Nationals traded Gore to the Texas Rangers in exchange for Gavin Fien, Alejandro Rosario, Devin Fitz-Gerald, Yeremy Cabrera, and Abimelec Ortiz.
