= Abimelec Ortiz =

Puerto Rican baseball player (born 2002)

- Ortiz with the Nationals in August 2026

Washington Nationals – No. 81
- First baseman
- Born: February 22, 2002 (age 24); Bayamón, Puerto Rico
- Bats: Left Throws: Left

MLB debut
- July 12, 2026, for the Washington Nationals

MLB statistics (through 2026 season)
- Batting average: .188
- Home runs: 5
- Runs batted in: 14
- Stats at Baseball Reference

Teams
- Washington Nationals (2026–present)

Abimelec Ortiz (born February 22, 2002) is a Puerto Rican professional baseball first baseman for the Washington Nationals of Major League Baseball (MLB). He debuted in MLB in 2026.

== Career ==
=== Amateur ===
Ortiz attended Carlos Beltran Baseball Academy in Florida, Puerto Rico, where he hit .400 in his senior season. He attended Florida SouthWestern State College in Fort Myers, Florida to play college baseball. Ortiz hit .349 with nine home runs, 47 RBI, and five stolen bases in his freshman season of 2021.

=== Texas Rangers ===
After going undrafted following the 2021 season, Ortiz signed a free agent contract with the Texas Rangers on July 15, 2021.

Ortiz was assigned to the DSL Rangers of the Rookie-level Dominican Summer League for his professional debut season of 2021 and hit .233/.419/.581 with 11 home runs, 33 RBI, and five stolen bases over 40 games. He spent the 2022 season with the Down East Wood Ducks of the Low-A Carolina League, hitting .226/.308/.380/.688 with 11 home runs, 39 RBI, and six stolen bases over 94 games. Ortiz returned to Kinston to open the 2023 season and hit .307/.392/.604 with seven home runs and 20 RBI over 20 games. He was promoted to the Hickory Crawdads of the High-A South Atlantic League on May 23. Over 80 games with Hickory, Ortiz hit .290/.363/.624 with 26 home runs and 81 RBI. He was named the Texas Rangers 2023 Tom Grieve Player of the Year. Following the 2023 season, Ortiz played for the Surprise Saguaros of the Arizona Fall League.

Ortiz made 130 appearances split between the Double-A Frisco RoughRiders and Triple-A Round Rock Express in 2025, hitting a combined .257/.356/.479 with 25 home runs and 89 RBI. On November 18, 2025, Ortiz's contract was selected by Texas, in order to protect him from the Rule 5 draft.

=== Washington Nationals ===
On January 22, 2026, the Rangers traded Ortiz, Alejandro Rosario, Devin Fitz-Gerald, Yeremy Cabrera, and Gavin Fien to the Washington Nationals in exchange for starting pitcher MacKenzie Gore. Ortiz was optioned to the Triple-A Rochester Red Wings to begin the regular season. In 71 appearances for Rochester, he batted .235/.332/.481 with 16 home runs and 59 RBI. On July 12, Ortiz was promoted to the major leagues for the first time.
