= Two-seam fastball =

Baseball and Softball pitch

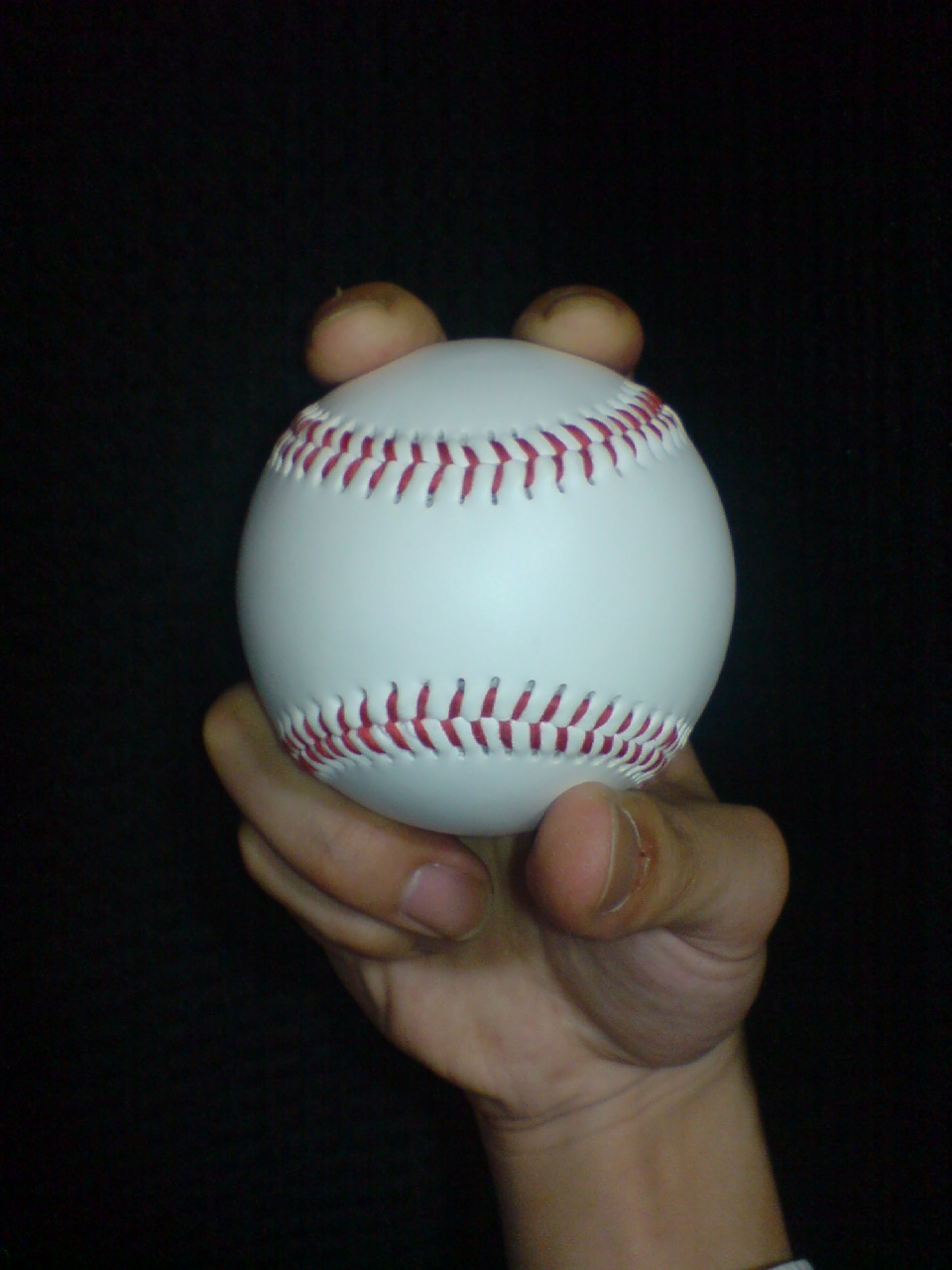
The grip used for a two-seam fastball

A two-seam fastball is a pitch in baseball and softball. It is a variant of the straight fastball. The pitch has the speed of a fastball and can also include late-breaking action caused by varying the pressure of the index and middle fingers on the ball.

== Grip and action ==
Several grips are used for a two-seam fastball, the most common of which is to place the index and middle fingers along the seams where they are closest together (where the horseshoes point in towards each other) with the thumb placed directly below on the leather with the rear of the thumb just touching the bottom near seam. The arm action is identical to a four-seam fastball, although the hand action differs slightly. Typically, the two-seam has more movement if the pitcher applies index fingertip pressure, or holds the baseball deeper in the hand. Both techniques cause the ball to spin out of the hand off-center and away from the pitcher, similar to the spin of a changeup.

The two-seam fastball is often perceived to be slower than the four-seam fastball, but the slight pronation of the hand and off-center spin on the ball carries the ball down and toward the pitcher's dominant side, down and to the right for right-handers, and down and to the left for left-handers.

A two-seam fastball that has a high horizontal break and drops less is often referred to as a running fastball. It is often higher in average velocity than a traditional two-seamer. In either case, the pitch is thrown in a two-seam orientation and has a gyro angle far from 0 degrees, leading to seam-shifted wake effects that cause downward and lateral movement compared to a four-seam fastball.

== Effectiveness ==
The two-seam fastball appears to have more movement than a four-seam fastball, but can be more difficult to master and control. The amount of break on the pitch varies greatly from pitcher to pitcher depending on velocity, arm slot angle, and pressure points of the fingers. The two-seamer is a very natural pitch to throw, and is often taught to pitchers at a very early age. Its use is widespread throughout all levels of baseball, and most pitchers at any level have a two-seamer in their repertoire. Many pitchers, especially those without exceptional velocity, prefer a two-seam fastball to the four-seam because of its movement at the plate. However, power pitchers such as Justin Verlander combine control, high velocity, and break to make the two-seamer one of the most effective pitches in baseball.

The velocity of this pitch also varies greatly from pitcher to pitcher. At the major collegiate level and higher, two-seam fastballs are typically thrown in the low 90s (MPH), but with much variation. Pitchers such as Greg Maddux, Bob Stanley, Brandon McCarthy, David Price, Eddie Guardado and Marcus Stroman are notable for having success at the major-league levels with two-seam fastballs in the mid 80s to lower 90s.

== Notable two-seam fastball pitchers ==
- Henderson Alvarez
- Kevin Appier
- Jake Arrieta
- Bill Lee
- Chad Bradford
- Bartolo Colón
- Johnny Cueto
- Doug Fister
- Eddie Guardado
- Lucas Harrell
- Félix Hernández
- Tim Lincecum
- Kyle Lohse
- Greg Maddux
- Brandon McCarthy
- Dallas Keuchel
- Corey Kluber
- Charlie Morton
- Jamie Moyer
- Jake Peavy
- Rick Porcello
- Tanner Roark
- David Price
- Bob Stanley
- Max Scherzer
- Gerrit Cole
- Tommy Milone
- Matt Harvey
- Marcus Stroman
- Zach Britton
- Dustin May

== See also ==
- Sinker (baseball)
