= Brandon Webb =

American baseball player (born 1979)

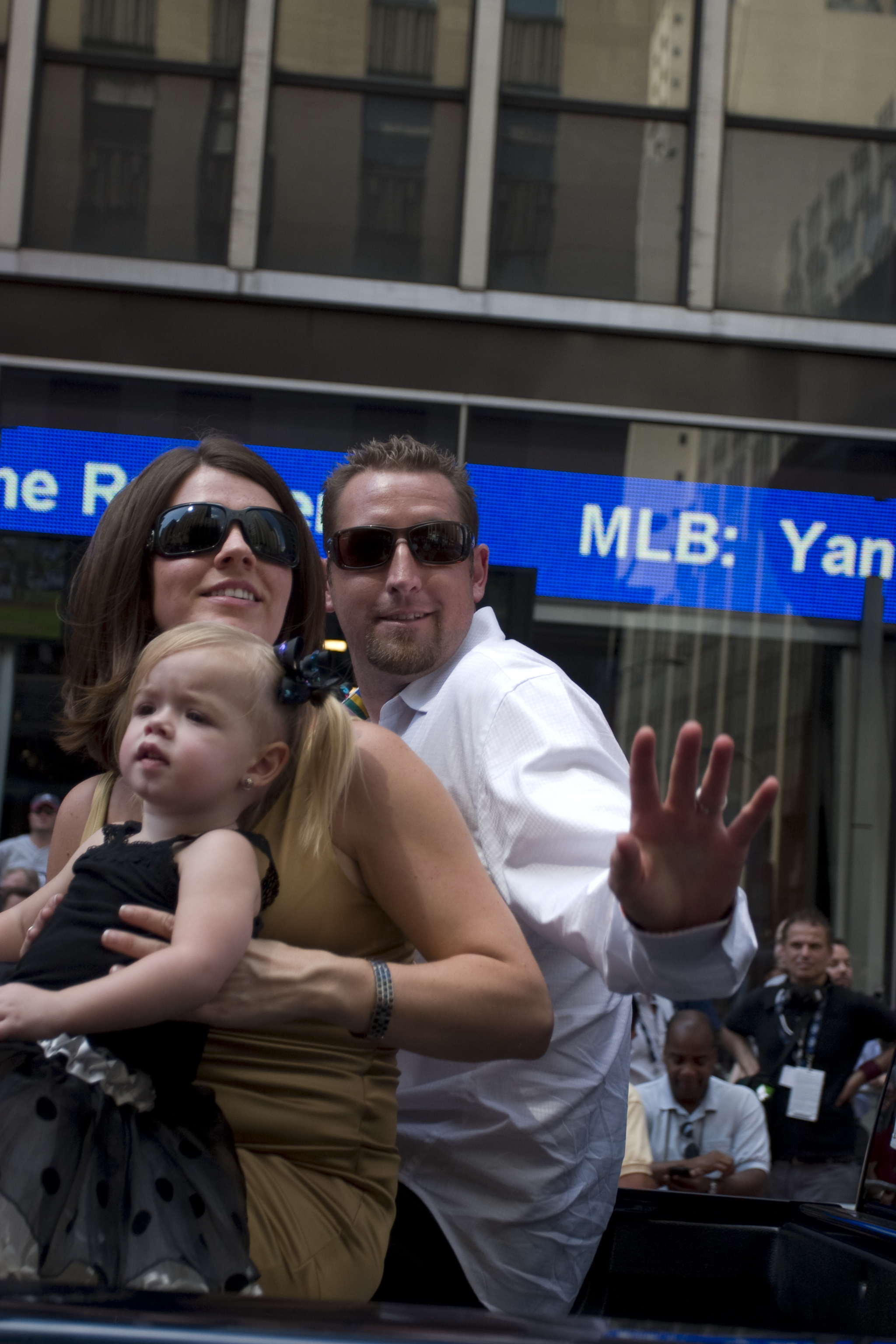
- Webb in the 2008 All Star Game Red Carpet Parade
- Pitcher
- Born: May 9, 1979 (age 47); Ashland, Kentucky, U.S.
- Batted: Right Threw: Right

MLB debut
- April 22, 2003, for the Arizona Diamondbacks

Last MLB appearance
- April 6, 2009, for the Arizona Diamondbacks

MLB statistics
- Win–loss record: 87–62
- Earned run average: 3.27
- Strikeouts: 1,065
- Stats at Baseball Reference

Teams
- Arizona Diamondbacks (2003–2009)

Career highlights and awards
- 3× All-Star (2006–2008); NL Cy Young Award (2006); 2× NL wins leader (2006, 2008)

Brandon Tyler Webb (born May 9, 1979) is an American former professional baseball pitcher. Webb pitched in Major League Baseball (MLB) for the Arizona Diamondbacks from 2003 through 2009, and, after multiple shoulder surgeries, signed with but did not play for the Texas Rangers in 2011. Webb attended the University of Kentucky, where he played college baseball for the Wildcats baseball team.

During his MLB career, Webb won the 2006 National League Cy Young Award and was a three-time MLB All-Star. He was sidelined with injuries for much of 2009–2012 and, after several aborted comeback attempts, retired in 2013. He has the 18th highest Adjusted ERA+ of all major league players with 142.

== Amateur career ==
Webb attended Paul G. Blazer High School in Ashland, Kentucky, and graduated in 1997. Afterwards, he attended the University of Kentucky, where he played for the Kentucky Wildcats baseball team. During his tenure with Kentucky, Webb set the all-time single season record for strikeouts by a Wildcat (123). He was inducted into the UK Athletics Hall of Fame in 2009.

== Professional career ==
=== Arizona Diamondbacks ===
Webb was drafted by the Arizona Diamondbacks in the 8th round of the 2000 Major League Baseball draft. He made his first major league appearance on April 22, 2003, against the Montreal Expos. Webb finished the 2003 season with 28 starts and a 10–9 record. He was awarded Baseball America Rookie of the Year and placed third in the Major League Baseball Rookie of the Year Award voting in the National League.

Webb was made the #2 starter to Randy Johnson in 2004 following the team's offseason trade of Curt Schilling. He finished the season with a 7–16 record in a league high 35 starts, leading the league in losses, walks and wild pitches, and posting an ERA of 3.59.

In 2005, he posted a 14–12 record and an ERA of 3.54. He led the team in ERA, innings pitched (229) and wild pitches (14). After the season he signed a four-year contract extension worth a guaranteed $19.5 million (that included a team option for 2010).

Through his first 13 starts of the 2006 season, Webb had a perfect 8–0 record, which included a 30 inning scoreless streak. He suffered his first losing effort of the season on June 10, in a 5–0 loss to the New York Mets. An early contender to win the National League Cy Young Award, Webb pitched in the 2006 MLB All-Star Game, recording one hitless inning.

Webb struggled in the second half of the season in part due to elbow soreness. He scored a win in an emotional outing versus the San Diego Padres on August 28, pitching seven effective innings. The win came a day after close friend and former UK teammate Jon Hooker and his new bride were among the victims of the doomed Comair Flight 5191 leaving Lexington.

Webb went on to finish the 2006 season with a record of 16–8 and an earned run average of 3.10, and was recognized with the NL Cy Young Award. His 16 wins tied five other pitchers for the most victories in the National League. Webb's win total marked the lowest for a starting pitcher who won the Cy Young in a full season. His 3.10 ERA was the fourth best in the majors.

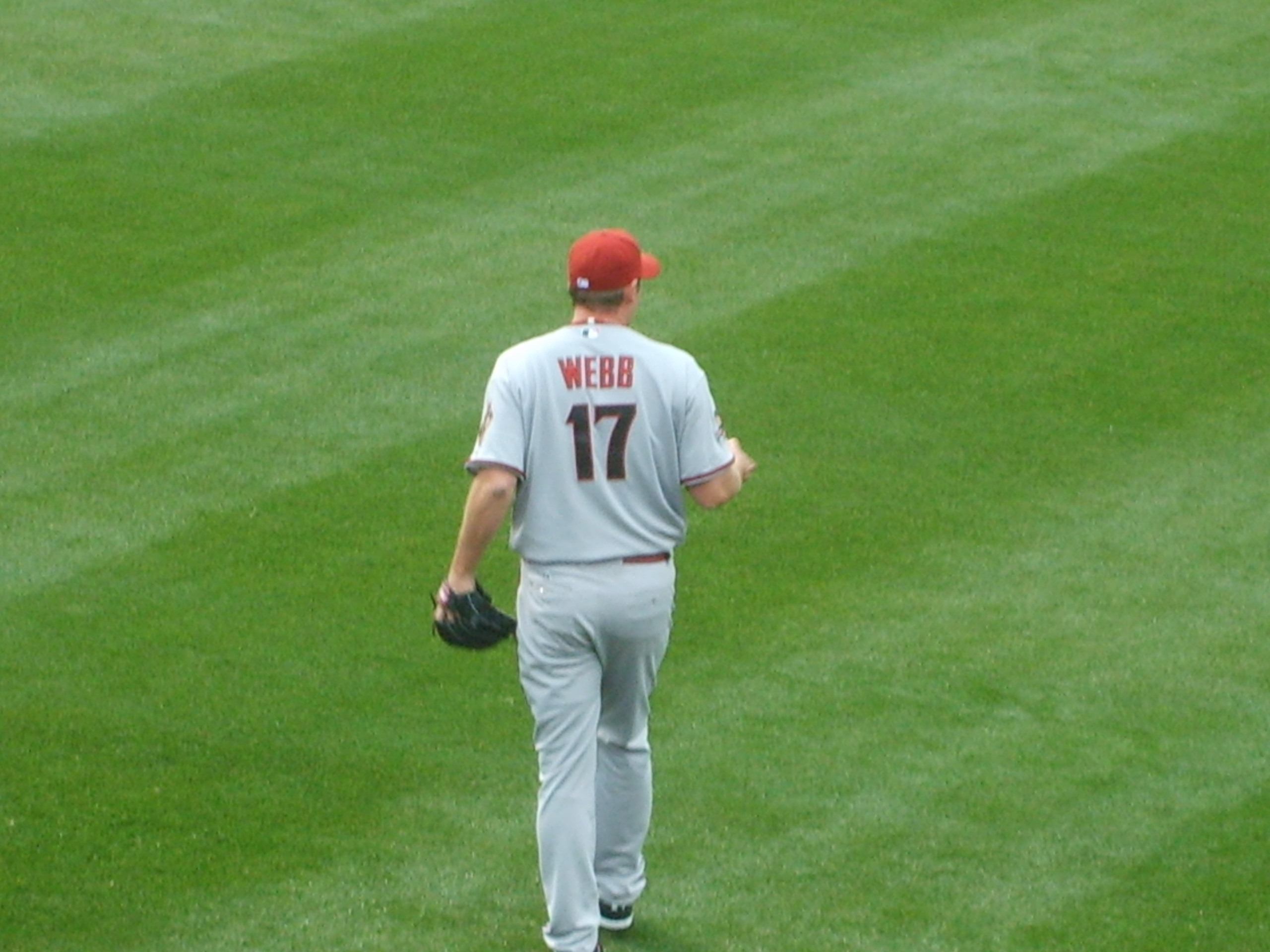
Webb in 2008

In 2007 Webb logged a then-franchise record 42 scoreless innings streak as of the conclusion of his start on August 17, 2007, including three straight shutouts. This is the fifteenth longest such streak in major league history. His three consecutive shutouts during the streak was the longest streak since Roger Clemens accomplished the same with Toronto in 1998. This streak came to an end when the Milwaukee Brewers scored in the first inning of his start on August 22, 2007. The franchise record was broken by Zac Gallen in 2022.

Webb carried the D'backs rotation in 2007, leading the team as it won the National League West crown. Webb finished with a record of 18–10 with a 3.01 ERA. Webb pitched the first game of the 2007 playoffs against the Chicago Cubs. Webb pitched 7 innings of 1 run ball, striking out 9 en route to a win.

The Diamondbacks went on to sweep the Cubs but fell to the Rockies in the NLCS, Webb falling in the first game. Webb allowed 4 runs in 6 innings, taking the loss. The Diamondbacks were ultimately swept 4–0.

Webb began the 2008 season with nine straight wins, becoming the first Major League pitcher to do so since Andy Hawkins won his first ten in 1985. Going into the All-Star break Webb was atop the Majors in wins, standing at 13–4 with an ERA of 3.21 and a WHIP of 1.13. He made the All-Star team and threw a scoreless 14th inning with two strikeouts at Yankee Stadium.

Webb finished the 2008 season with a career high and NL leading 22 wins, against 7 losses. He finished second in the National League Cy Young voting to division rival Tim Lincecum. His 3.15 ground ball/fly ball ratio was the highest in the major leagues.

In 2009, Webb was named #31 on the Sporting News' list of the 50 top current players in baseball.

Webb pitched on opening day against the Colorado Rockies, but was limited to just four innings. On April 7, 2009, he was placed on the disabled list with right shoulder bursitis. On August 3, 2009, Dr. Keith Meister of the Rangers performed surgery on his right shoulder, ending his season. Despite the injury, after the 2009 season ended the Diamondbacks picked up Webb's $8.5 million option for 2010. The team would have had to pay a $2 million buyout had it declined. Webb spent the year rehabbing his injury and did not appear at all in 2010.

=== Texas Rangers ===
Webb became a free agent at the conclusion of the season and on December 26, 2010, agreed to a one-year contract with the Texas Rangers. Webb made his first appearance in a game in more than two years on May 30, 2011, pitching for Double-A Frisco. Over 3 1/3 innings, he allowed five runs on eight hits, struck out two, walked two and hit a batter.

On July 24, the Rangers announced Webb would undergo a second right rotator cuff surgery on August 1, 2011, that would sideline him until the start of the 2012 season.

=== Retirement ===
Webb officially retired from Major League Baseball on February 4, 2013. In May 2013, he filed a workers' compensation claim against the Texas Rangers for shoulder, neck, back, arm, and musculo-skeletal system injuries.

== Pitching style ==
Webb was mainly known for his sinker, regarded to be on par with Roy Halladay and Chien-Ming Wang's as among the game's best sinkerballers. He threw it in the 87–91 mph range, a curveball (72–75mph), changeup (77–80mph), and occasionally a cutter against left-handed hitters.

Webb's sinker made him an effectivegroundball pitcher, with one of the best ground ball/fly ball ratios in the game, at more than 3.5:1. His changeup could be useful for getting swinging strikes, yielding a 55% whiff rate in the 2008 season.

== Personal life ==
Webb and his wife, Alicia, make their home in Ashland, Kentucky.

In December 2007, the Kentucky Transportation Cabinet renamed a section of U.S. Route 60 the "Brandon Webb Highway" in honor of Webb.

In 2005, Webb established Brandon Webb's K Foundation, a charity that aims to "improve the lives of critically and chronically ill children throughout Arizona by providing daily support and life changing experiences."

== See also ==
- Arizona Diamondbacks award winners and league leaders
- List of Arizona Diamondbacks team records
- List of Major League Baseball annual shutout leaders
- List of Major League Baseball annual wins leaders

Awards and achievements
Preceded by Eric Hinske	Baseball America Rookie of the Year; 2003	Succeeded by Khalil Greene
Preceded by Jake Peavy	National League Pitcher of the month April 2008	Succeeded by Todd Wellemeyer
