= Luis García Jr. =

American baseball player (born 2000)

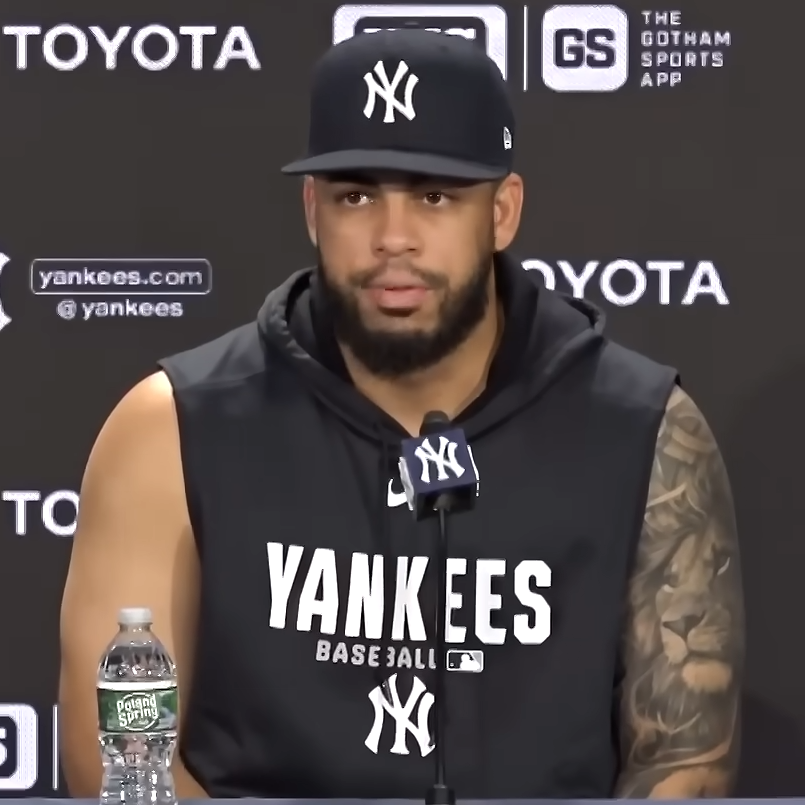
- García with the New York Yankees in 2026

New York Yankees – No. 26
- First baseman / Second baseman
- Born: May 16, 2000 (age 26); New York City, U.S.
- Bats: Left Throws: Right

MLB debut
- August 14, 2020, for the Washington Nationals

MLB statistics (through 2026 season)
- Batting average: .268
- Home runs: 88
- Runs batted in: 361
- Stats at Baseball Reference

Teams
- Washington Nationals (2020–2026); New York Yankees (2026–present)

Luis Victoriano García (born May 16, 2000) is a Dominican-American professional baseball infielder for the New York Yankees of Major League Baseball (MLB). He has previously played in MLB for the Washington Nationals. He made his MLB debut in 2020.

== Early life ==
García's father, Luis Rafael García, is a Dominican-born shortstop who briefly reached the major leagues with the Detroit Tigers during their 1999 season. Luis Victoriano García was born in New York City, but he moved to the Dominican Republic at the age of 8. At the age of 16, despite being a U.S. citizen, he signed a contract with the Nationals on July 2, 2016, as an international free agent out of the Dominican Republic.

== Professional career ==
=== Washington Nationals ===
When he signed with the Washington Nationals in 2016, García accepted a $1.3 million signing bonus, the second-most the Nationals awarded an international player in the 2016 class behind fellow Dominican shortstop Yasel Antuna.

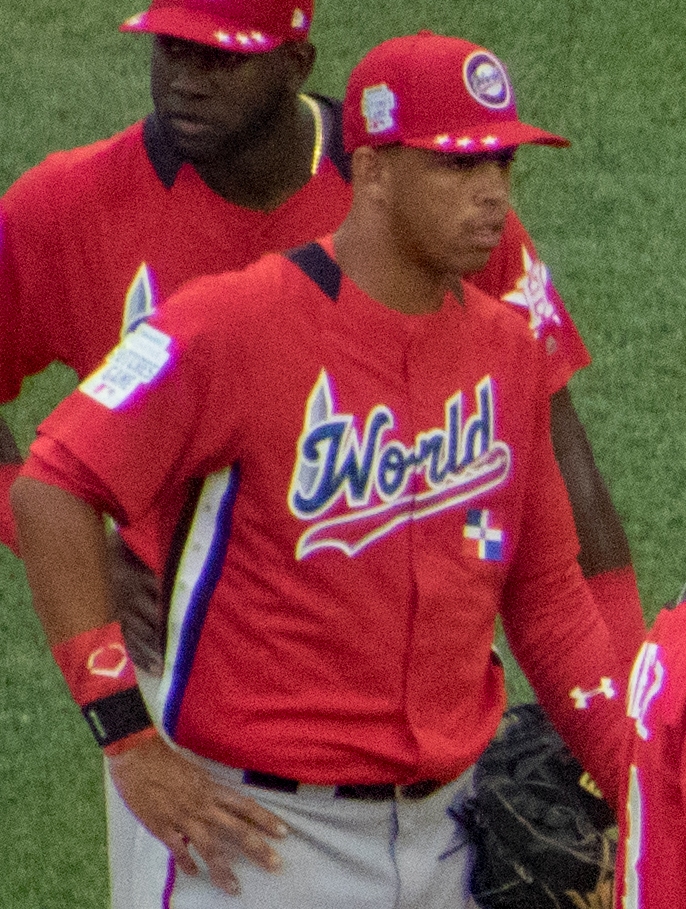
García at the All-Star Futures Game in 2018

Baseball America ranked García as the Nationals' seventh-best prospect before the 2017 season. García made his professional debut in 2017 with the Gulf Coast League Nationals, appearing as both a second baseman and shortstop during the season and often forming the GCL Nationals' double-play tandem with Antuna. Both players put up batting averages slightly above .300, with García's the better of the two at .302, during their 2017 campaigns. García advanced quickly in the 2018 season, earning a midseason promotion from the Single-A Hagerstown Suns to the High-A Potomac Nationals, and he was the youngest player and the first ever born in the 2000s selected to the All-Star Futures Game in 2018, playing for Team World against fellow Nationals infield prospect Carter Kieboom and Team USA.

García was the youngest player invited to participate in a major league spring training camp in 2019, with the Nationals. He was one of eleven Nationals prospects who played for the Surprise Saguaros in the Arizona Fall League that year, driving in the Saguaros' only run in the championship game versus the Salt River Rafters on October 25, 2019.

On August 14, 2020, García's contract was selected to the major leagues and he made his debut that day against the Baltimore Orioles, filling in for the injured Starlin Castro. Three days later, he became the first MLB player born in the 2000s to hit a home run. Coincidentally, Castro, who he replaced due to injury, was the first MLB player born in the 1990s to hit a home run. García finished his rookie season hitting .276/.302/.366 in 40 games.

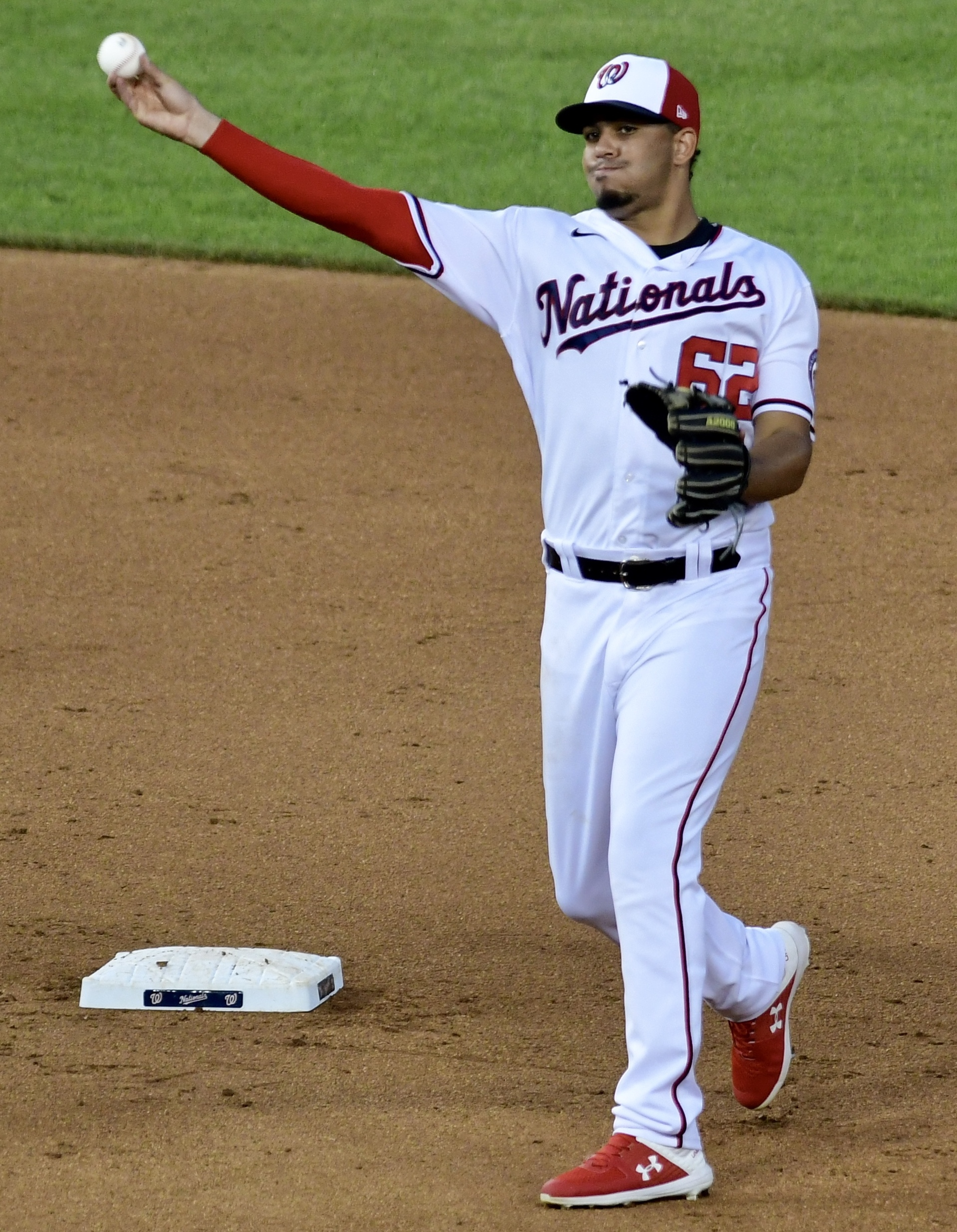
García in 2020

On April 6, 2021, García was called up briefly before being optioned back to the Nationals alternate training site on April 12. He was assigned to the Triple-A Rochester Red Wings 1 day before the minor league season began, on May 3. García was called up again on May 25, appearing in two games at the major league level before being sent back down on May 30. He was recalled yet again on June 16, staying in the majors for just 4 days before returning to Rochester. García was called up for a fourth time during the season on July 29. He became the Nationals everyday second baseman, following the trades of infielders Josh Harrison and Trea Turner as well as the suspension and subsequent release of Starlin Castro. He finished 2021 slashing .303/.371/.599 in 37 games at the Triple-A level and .242/.275/.411 in 70 games in MLB.

García once again began the 2022 season at Triple-A Rochester. He hit eight home runs along with 32 RBI in 42 games before joining the Nationals on June 1. García recorded his 10th career home run on June 15.

On May 26, 2023, in a 12–10 victory over the Kansas City Royals, García went 6-for-6 at the plate. In doing so, García became the third player in Nationals/Expos history with six hits in a single game, joining Anthony Rendon (2017) and Rondell White (1995). He ended the season batting .266 with nine home runs and 50 RBI.

Before the 2024 season, he changed his official player name to García Jr. In 2024, he led the team in RBI with 70, in batting (qualified hitters) with a .282 average, which was 11th best in the National League, had a career-high 18 home runs, 25 doubles, and 22 stolen bases, and was named the Nationals' Player of the Year.

With the departures of Tanner Rainey and Kyle Finnegan in the 2024-2025 offseason, García began the 2025 season as the longest tenured player on the Nationals. García ended the 2025 season slashing .252/.289/.412 in 139 games, with 16 home runs, 66 RBI, and 14 stolen bases. On September 26, 2025, on one of the last games of the season, he became the eighth player in Nationals history to hit three home runs in a game, in a loss against the Chicago White Sox.

The Nationals moved García to first base during 2026 spring training. García was named the National League's Player of the Week for June 22-28, when he batted .526 with six home runs and nine RBI. At the time of his trade to the New York Yankees on August 2, García was leading the National League in slugging percentage at .564 and had already set a career-high in home runs with 23 and RBI with 76.

=== New York Yankees ===
On August 2, 2026, the Nationals traded García to the New York Yankees in exchange for Jake Bird, Yovanny Cruz, Ben Grable, and Jack Cebert. On August 3, in his first game as a Yankee, García hit a two run home run against the St. Louis Cardinals at Yankee Stadium to give the Yankees a 7-6 lead after trailing 6-0, although the Cardinals came back to win 13-7.

== See also ==
- List of Dominican Americans
- List of Major League Baseball players from the Dominican Republic
- List of people from New York City
- List of second-generation Major League Baseball players
