= Seam-shifted wake =

Baseball physics

Seam-shifted wake is an aerodynamic phenomenon involving baseballs. The term was coined in 2019 by Andrew Smith during his work on the phenomenon with Barton L. Smith (no relation) at Utah State University. Nazmus Sakib and John Garrett also contributed to the early work.

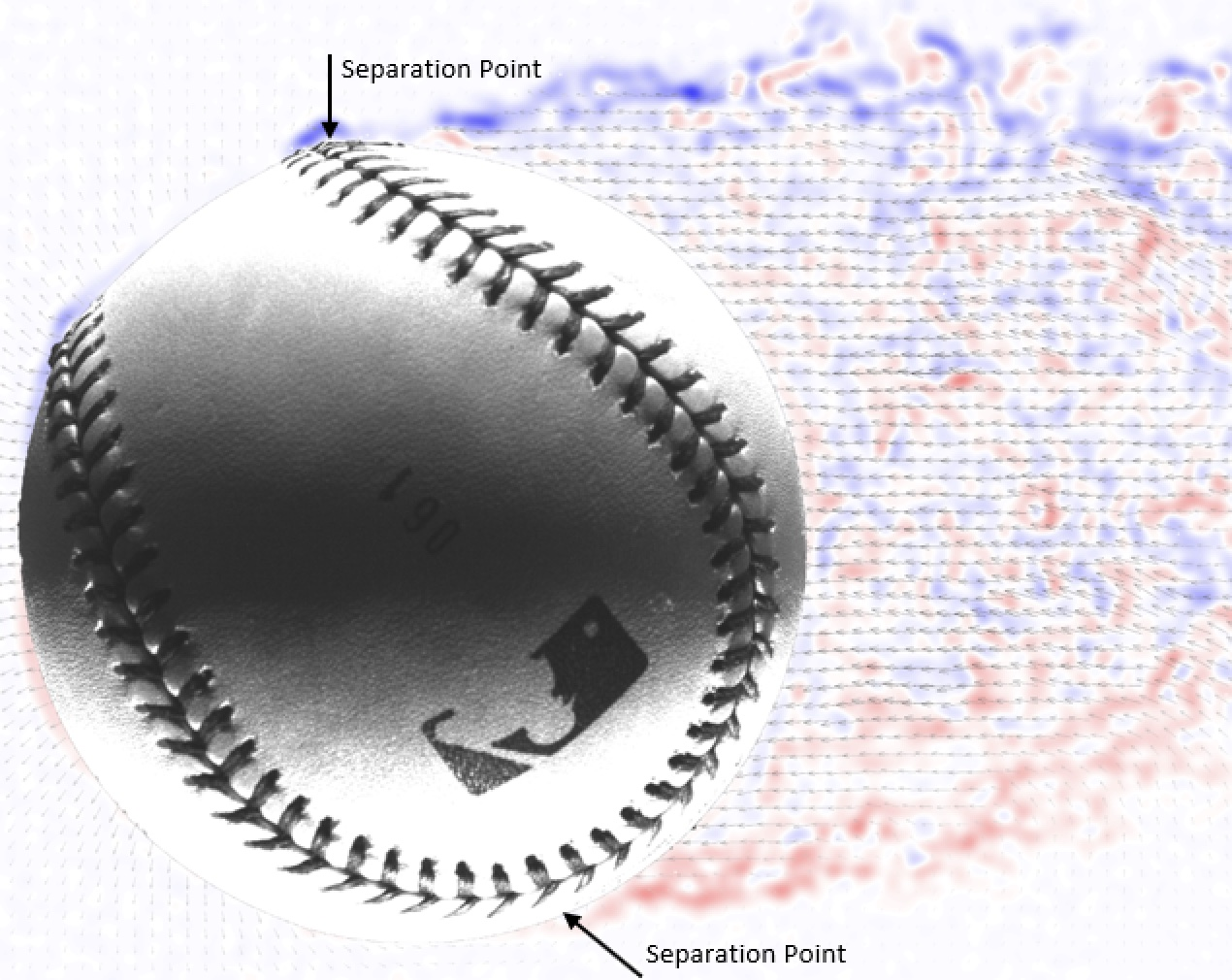
Particle Image Velocimetry image of a baseball at 90 mph

The Utah State group showed that Major League Baseball (MLB) baseball seams, when in specific locations relative to the direction of the ball, force the boundary layer to separate earlier (closer to the front of the ball) than it normally would. If this occurs on one side of the ball and not on the opposite side, a net force is produced. This force can be similar in magnitude to that caused by spin (i.e. the Magnus effect).

In the particle image velocimetry image shown, the seam on the top of the ball is causing separation (wake formation) on the top closer to the front of the ball than normal. The separation on the bottom of the ball is at the normal location.

The resultant movement from this effect had been noted by others before and named the "laminar effect" based on a mistaken notion that smooth portions of the ball caused a laminar boundary layer more prone to separation than a turbulent boundary layer. This was most often discussed with respect to 2-seam fastballs.

Spin of a sinker pitch from the catcher's perspective with a spin axis and seam orientation likely to induce seam-shifted wake effects.

Data from MLB on pitch spin and movement, which were not available in 2019, now make it clear that seam-shifted wake effects are present in most pitches. Seam effects cause two-seam fastballs and changeups to develop additional arm-side movement as well as sink.

Four-seam fastballs can gain extra vertical ride as well as glove-side movement. Certain sliders will "sweep" (or move arm-side) due to seam effects. Some claim benefits from SSW pitches in terms of batter outcomes. Better understanding of seam-shifted wake has led to an increase in the number of pitchers throwing sinkers, which had been on the decline.

Evidence of seam-shifted wake pitches for major league pitchers can be found by comparing spin-based movement to observed movement on MLB's Spin Leaderboard. These two values being equal indicates no seam-shifted wake, while differences between them (called deviation) are a sign of seam-shifted wake.

Several extensive explanations of how seam-shifted wake works and what it does to pitches are available.

== Laminar flow and turbulence ==
In cricket, swing bowling is an effect that occurs when the hemispherical seam on the ball is positioned such that the boundary layer on one side of the ball remains ordered and steady (i.e. Laminar) while the other side becomes turbulent. The ball's trajectory deflects toward the turbulent side. Around 2019, many attempted to explain defection of baseball trajectories by claiming smooth portions of the ball resulted in laminar flow, while seams resulted in turbulent flow. It has been shown that, were this the case in baseball, the deflection would be in the opposite direction as what is observed. The baseball seam's most important effect is to remove the boundary layer from the side on which it resides, leading to a deflection away from the seam. The reason for the difference in the effect of a cricket ball seam and a baseball seam are two-fold: 1) The baseball seam has a more complicated pattern that mostly prohibits not having a seam on one side of the ball and 2) The baseball seam is shaped more like a ramp than a series of small bumps, as in the case of a cricket ball.

== Examples ==
Greg Maddux was given a ball that had a scuff on one side. He was known for his knee bending two-seam; however, when he threw this ball he angled the scuff on the left side of the ball, in turn giving more movement to the right.

Shohei Ohtani's sweeper was the most valuable sweeper in 2023 based on bWAR and runs prevented. It exhibited 3.8 inches more of movement than the average sweeper in the league.

Paul Skenes' splinker was the best pitch in the major leagues during 2024 based on batting average. It was a sinker with lower than average spin rate and a different axis allowing more downward movement compared to the average sinker.
