= Fastball =

Baseball pitch thrown at a pitcher's top speed

The fastball is the most common type of pitch thrown by pitchers in baseball and softball. Its distinctive feature is its high speed. "Power pitchers", such as former major leaguers Nolan Ryan and Roger Clemens, relied on the speed, often exceeding 100 mph (45 m/s), and movement of their fastballs to prevent the ball from being hit. As an alternative to the fastball, pitchers can put more movement on slower thrown balls, or throw them towards the inside or outside of home plate where batters cannot easily reach it.

Fastballs are usually thrown with a backspin so that the Magnus effect creates an upward force on the ball. This causes it to fall less rapidly than expected, and sometimes causes an optical illusion often called a rising fastball. Although it is impossible for a human to throw a baseball fast enough and with enough backspin for the ball to actually rise, to the batter the pitch seems to rise due to the unexpected lack of natural drop on the pitch.

Colloquially, a fastball pitcher is said to throw "heat" or "high cheese”, among many other variants.

== Types of fastballs ==
Types of fastballs as thrown by a right handed pitcher and viewed from the catcher's perspective: four-seam, sinker, and cutter

Many varieties or 'shapes' of fastballs have been described throughout baseball history, including four-seam fastballs, rising fastballs, two-seam fastballs, sinkers, running fastballs, cut fastballs, and split finger fastballs. However, MLB currently recognizes three distinct types of fastballs, each with substantial variety in terms of movement, consolidating the numerous antiquated descriptors into three groups: four-seam fastballs, sinkers (two-seam fastballs), and cutters (cut fastballs). Despite its name, the split-finger fastball or 'splitter' is not considered to be a type of fastball and is known as an off-speed pitch.

=== Four-seam fastball ===
Spin of three four-seam-fastballs thrown by Paul Skenes, Bailey Ober, and James Karinchak, from the catcher's perspective

The four-seam fastball is the most common variant of the fastball. The pitch is used often by the pitcher to get ahead in the count or when he needs to throw a strike. This type of fastball is intended to have minimal lateral movement, relying more on its speed and vertical "rising" movement. It is typically the fastest pitch a pitcher throws, with recorded top speeds above 100 mph (45 m/s). Two general methods are used to throw a four-seam fastball. The first and most traditional way is to find the horseshoe seam area, or the area where the seams are the furthest apart. Keeping those seams parallel to the body, the pitcher places his index and middle fingers perpendicular to them with the pads on the furthest seam from him. The thumb then rests underneath the ball about in the middle of the two fingers. With this grip, the thumb will generally have no seam on which to rest.

An animated diagram of a four-seam fastball

The four-seam fastball is widely regarded as the main key to advancing to the next level of play. One of a baseball scout's main criteria when scouting a prospect is how fast he throws a four-seam fastball.

=== Sinker (two-seam fastball) ===
The sinker, synonymous with the two-seam fastball, two-seamer, tailing fastball, or running fastball is a type of fastball thrown with a seam orientation that induces more downward or arm-side horizontal movement compared to four-seam fastballs or cutters. Historically, distinctions have been made between these terms, but today, they are all recognized by MLB as variations of the same pitch. Differences in arm slot, spin, and velocity cause some sinkers to exhibit more vertical "drop" or "sink", while others "run" or move more horizontally toward the pitcher's arm side. The unique running and sinking movement profile of the sinker makes it more likely to induce ground balls than other pitches as it sinks under the plane of the batter's swing. Not all fastballs exhibiting sinking or running movement are necessarily sinkers; four-seam fastballs thrown from a low arm slot can also exhibit sinking and running movement due to the horizontal spin axis imparted by a low or sidearm release point.

Spin of three sinkers thrown by Yennier Canó, Clay Holmes, and Sonny Gray, from the catcher's perspective

To throw a sinker, the pitcher typically grips the ball as they would a four-seam, but with their index and middle finger parallel to the seams instead of perpendicular to them. This causes the ball to spin with two seams crossing the plane of spin instead of four.

Throughout much of baseball history, the reasons why a two-seam grip resulted in different ball movement compared to a four-seam fastball were not fully understood. While it was recognized that a reduced spin rate or altered spin axis could create the distinct movement profile of the sinker, it is now understood that the distinctive movement profile of sinkers is primarily due to the seam-shifted wake (SSW) phenomenon.

When a sinker is thrown with a moderate degree of gyro spin and properly oriented seams, the rotating seams around one pole of the baseball create a greater disturbance in the air compared to the seamless area around the other pole. This uneven drag force induces a force perpendicular to the spin direction, typically resulting in more horizontal run, vertical drop, and generally more unpredictable movement than sinkers with less substantial SSW effects. While all pitches experience SSW effects to some degree, sinkers with pronounced seam-shifted movement are understood to be particularly effective pitches, resulting in better outcomes like increased ground ball rates.

The sinker has been a staple for many notable pitchers, often referred to as "sinkerballers", such as:

- Greg Maddux, widely regarded as among the finest starting pitchers of all time, pitched heavily off his sinker. He relied on its substantial movement, his precise control, and its above average low 90s speed to generate ground balls as a young pitcher. Towards the end of his career, his speed declined into the mid 80s, but his excellent sinker helped him remain effective.
- Brandon Webb, one of the most highly regarded pitchers of the 2000s before injuries forced his early retirement, was known for having one of the best sinkers in the league. He relied on this pitch to earn a Cy Young Award and two runner-up finishes from 2006 to 2008.
- Zack Britton, one of the most successful relievers of the 2010s, threw a mid to high 90s sinker more than 90% of the time at his peak. His sinker, now known to have benefitted from substantial seam-shifted wake (SSW) effects, consistently helped him lead the league in ground ball rates.

=== Cutter (cut fastball) ===
An animated diagram of a cutter

The cutter, or cut fastball, is a pitch that blurs the lines between a four-seam fastball and a slider. The pitcher typically shifts their grip on a four-seam fastball to the side of the ball, and slightly supinates their wrist to convert some backspin into gyroscopic spin. This alters the movement of the fastball in several ways.

Spin of three cutters thrown by Louie Varland, Emmanuel Clase, and Kenley Jansen, from the catcher's perspective

- Reduces the speed of the pitch, typically by 2–8 mph (0.89–3.58 m/s) compared to the pitchers four-seam speed, depending on the degree of wrist supination and biomechanical factors.
- Shifts the spin axis of the ball either reducing arm side movement or adding glove side movement.
- Increases gyroscopic spin typically leading to less induced vertical movement and causing the pitch to drop more rapidly than a four-seam fastball.
- Altered seam orientation combining with gyroscopic spin increases seam-shifted wake effects inducing cutting movement to the pitch.
- Many pitchers are able to spin cutters at a higher rate than their four-seam fastball. In MLB in 2024, cutters averaged nearly 2400 RPM compared to around 2300 RPM for the average four-seam fastball.

Combined, these effects typically create a pitch slower than a pitcher's four-seam, that drops faster with either sharp glove-side "cutting" movement or minimal arm-side movement.

Though the cutter is less common in MLB than the four-seam and the sinker, there have been many notable practitioners such as:

- Mariano Rivera, widely regarded as the greatest relief pitcher in baseball history, relied heavily on a low to mid-90s cutter, at times throwing it almost exclusively. This pitch became notorious for inducing soft contact by cutting in on the hands of left-handed hitters.
- Kenley Jansen, one of the most consistent and decorated relievers of the 2010s, has consistently thrown a low to mid-90s cutter throughout his career. The pitch's heavy seam-shifted wake induced cut has led to elite whiff rates, consistently in excess of 30%, against right-handed hitters.
- Emmanuel Clase relies heavily on his hard cutter. Consistently averaging around 100 mph (45 m/s) and reaching as high as 102.8 mph (46.0 m/s), the pitch has produced extremely high ground ball rates throughout his career.

== Speed of fastballs and influence on MLB play ==
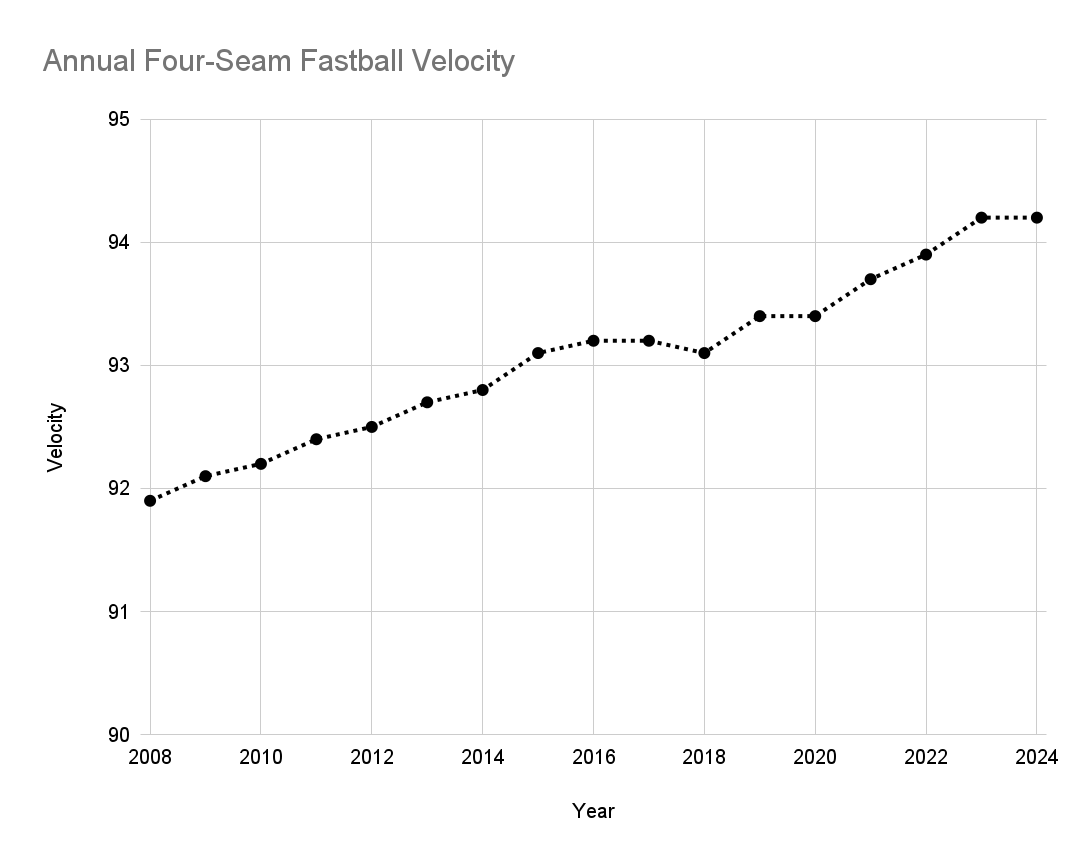
Average four-seam fastball speed since 2008

The fastest pitch officially recognized by MLB was a 105.8 mph (47.3 m/s) four-seam fastball thrown by Aroldis Chapman on September 24, 2010.

Since the mid-2000s, MLB has observed a significant increase in fastball speed among pitchers. In 2008, the average four-seam fastball speed in the MLB was below 92 mph (41 m/s). This figure has climbed steadily, surpassing 93 mph (42 m/s) by 2015, and exceeding 94 mph (42 m/s) by 2023. The frequency of pitches exceeding 100 mph (45 m/s) further illustrates this trend: in the 2008 regular season, only 214 fastballs reached speeds greater than 100 mph, whereas in 2023, there were 3,848 such pitches. This trend highlights significant advancements in athlete training as well as changes in player evaluation and development.

Increasing fastball speeds have contributed to a number of trends in MLB.

- Biomechanically, higher pitching speeds are associated with greater stress on a pitcher's arm, particularly the elbow and shoulder. Pitch speed has a significant correlation with injuries such as ulnar collateral ligament tears, necessitating reconstructive surgery.
- Pitchers are less capable of pitching frequently or pitching deep into games due to fatigue and injury concerns associated with throwing harder.
- Emphasis on speed has been criticized as encouraging homogeneity among pitchers, leading to a less aesthetically appealing game. Speed is encouraged, in part, to elevate pitchers' strikeout rates, often at the cost of increasing walks, hit batters, and allowing fewer balls in play. While this may improve the overall effectiveness of the pitcher, it might be less appealing for spectators who see less action.

== See also ==
- Biomechanics of baseball pitching
