= Sinker (pitch) =

Baseball pitch

In baseball, a sinker or sinking fastball is a type of fastball which has significant downward and horizontal movement and is known for inducing ground balls. Pitchers capable of utilizing the sinker are able to throw the pitch almost exclusively, as it forces weak contact and ground balls, allowing them to rely less on secondary pitches in order to change speeds. While coaches agree that this pitch is very similar to the two-seam fastball, a two-seamer tends to have more lateral movement than a sinker. In either case, the pitch is thrown in a two-seam orientation and has a gyro angle far from 0 degrees, leading to seam-shifted wake effects that cause downward and lateral movement compared to a four-seam fastball.

== History ==
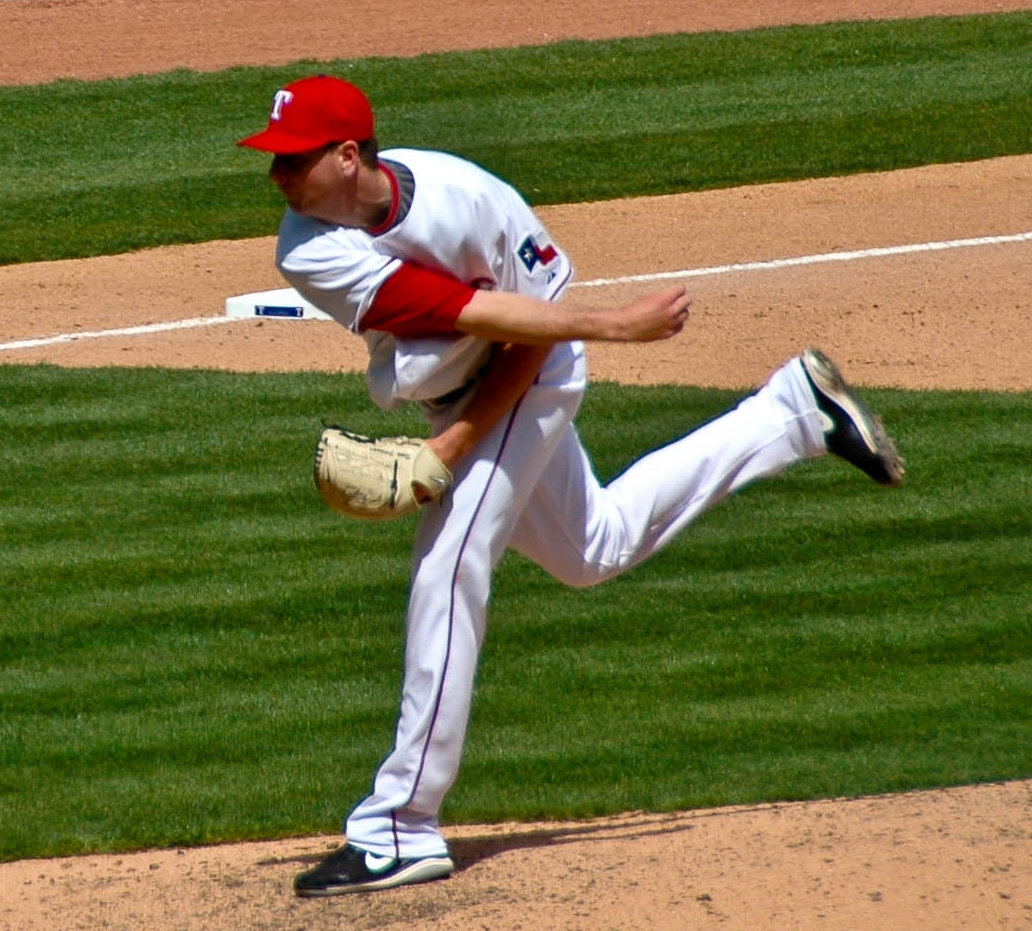
Scott Feldman

Before the 1950s, pitchers did not know what caused their pitches to sink or "hop". They regarded either ability as a "gift from heaven". Bill James cites Curt Simmons as the first pitcher to be able to throw both sinkers and rising fastballs, apparently indicating that it was not known how to make a pitch sink and how to make one hop.

== Throwing mechanics ==
One method of throwing the sinker is to simply grip the baseball along the two seams and throw it similar to a fastball. Some pitchers use a downward motion on their wrist when throwing it. The pitcher's palm turns to the right at release for a right-handed pitcher. This causes a sharper sink, but also has a greater risk of a wild pitch. This wrist movement is called pronation.

To effectively throw the sinker, one must apply pressure with their fingers on the inside edge of the baseball when throwing. This will tilt the spin axis away from a traditional backspin and also reduce overall spin rate, both of which will help the ball sink and add lateral movement to it.

== Effects on the batter ==
The sinker drops 6 to 9 inches more than a typical four-seam fastball, which causes batters to hit ground balls more often than other fastballs, mostly due to the tilted sidespin on the ball. Horizontal movement also occurs when sinkers are thrown. Sinkerball pitchers can often get called strikes and swinging strikes on the pitch.

== Notable sinkerballers ==
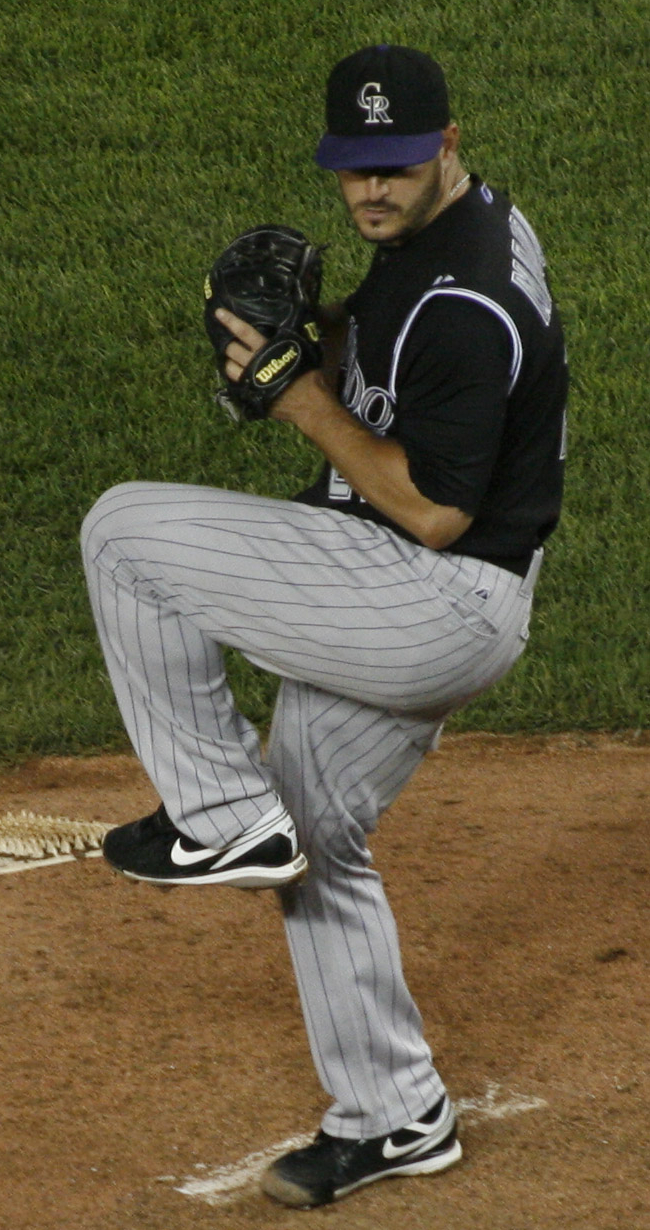
Jason Marquis

- Matt Albers
- Sandy Alcántara
- Burke Badenhop
- Ronald Belisario
- Brad Bergesen
- Zack Britton
- Kevin Brown
- Trevor Cahill
- Aroldis Chapman
- Steve Cishek
- Aaron Cook
- Kevin Correia
- Camilo Doval
- Scott Erickson
- Jeurys Familia
- Scott Feldman
- Jon Garland
- Josh Hader
- Roy Halladay
- Roberto Hernández
- Orel Hershiser
- Chris Heston
- Luke Hochevar
- Tim Hudson
- Tommy John
- Jim Johnson
- Randy Jones
- Jeff Karstens
- Scott Kazmir
- Kyle Kendrick
- Dallas Keuchel
- Brandon League
- Mike Leake
- Jonathan Loáisiga
- Kameron Loe
- Mickey Lolich
- Derek Lowe
- Greg Maddux
- Seth Maness
- Jason Marquis
- Justin Masterson
- Lance McCullers Jr.
- Jackie Mitchell
- Frankie Montas
- Charlie Morton
- Carl Pavano
- Mike Pelfrey
- Dan Quisenberry
- Tyler Rogers
- Cristopher Sánchez
- Carlos Silva
- Paul Skenes
- Bob Stanley
- Mel Stottlemyre
- Bill Swift
- Mike Timlin
- Framber Valdez
- Chien-Ming Wang
- Brandon Webb
- Logan Webb
- Randy Wells
- Jake Westbrook
- Jerome Williams
- Carlos Zambrano

== See also ==
- Two-seam fastball
