= Ground ball/fly ball ratio =

In baseball statistics, ground ball-fly ball ratio (denoted by G/F or GB/FB) is a measure of:

- Frequency of batted ground balls in play versus fly balls in play to denote what kind of contact a batter makes more frequently. Calculated as (total ground balls in play) / (total fly balls in play); and
- Frequency of ground balls allowed in play versus fly balls allowed in play to denote what kind of contact a pitcher surrenders more frequently to opposing batters. Calculated as (total ground balls in play surrendered) / (total fly balls in play surrendered).

The related statistic of ground outs-fly outs ratio (denoted by GO/AO), is a measure of:

- Frequency of batted ground ball outs versus fly ball outs hit by the batter, calculated as (number of ground ball outs) / (number of fly ball outs).
- Frequency of batted ground ball outs versus fly ball outs thrown by the pitcher, calculated as (number of ground ball outs) / (number of fly ball outs).

A statistic in baseball that compares the number of ground outs (ground ball hits that lead to an out for the batter) to air outs (fly balls that lead to an out for the batter), which determines the mix of fielded out types for both batters and pitchers. For each ground out (GO) and air out (AO), both the batter put out and the pitcher on the play receive either a GO or AO on their stat line, which is used in the calculation of the ratio.

The St. Louis Cardinals have led Major League Baseball in team ground ball/fly ball ratio since 2006. Sinker, cutter, and curveball pitchers tend to produce more ground balls, while pitchers who rely on fastballs, sliders, and split-fingered fastballs tend to produce more fly balls. Roughly 10% of fly balls are home runs. Fly ball pitchers in large parks however, tend to allow less than 7%.
