= Félix Hernández =

Venezuelan baseball player (born 1986)

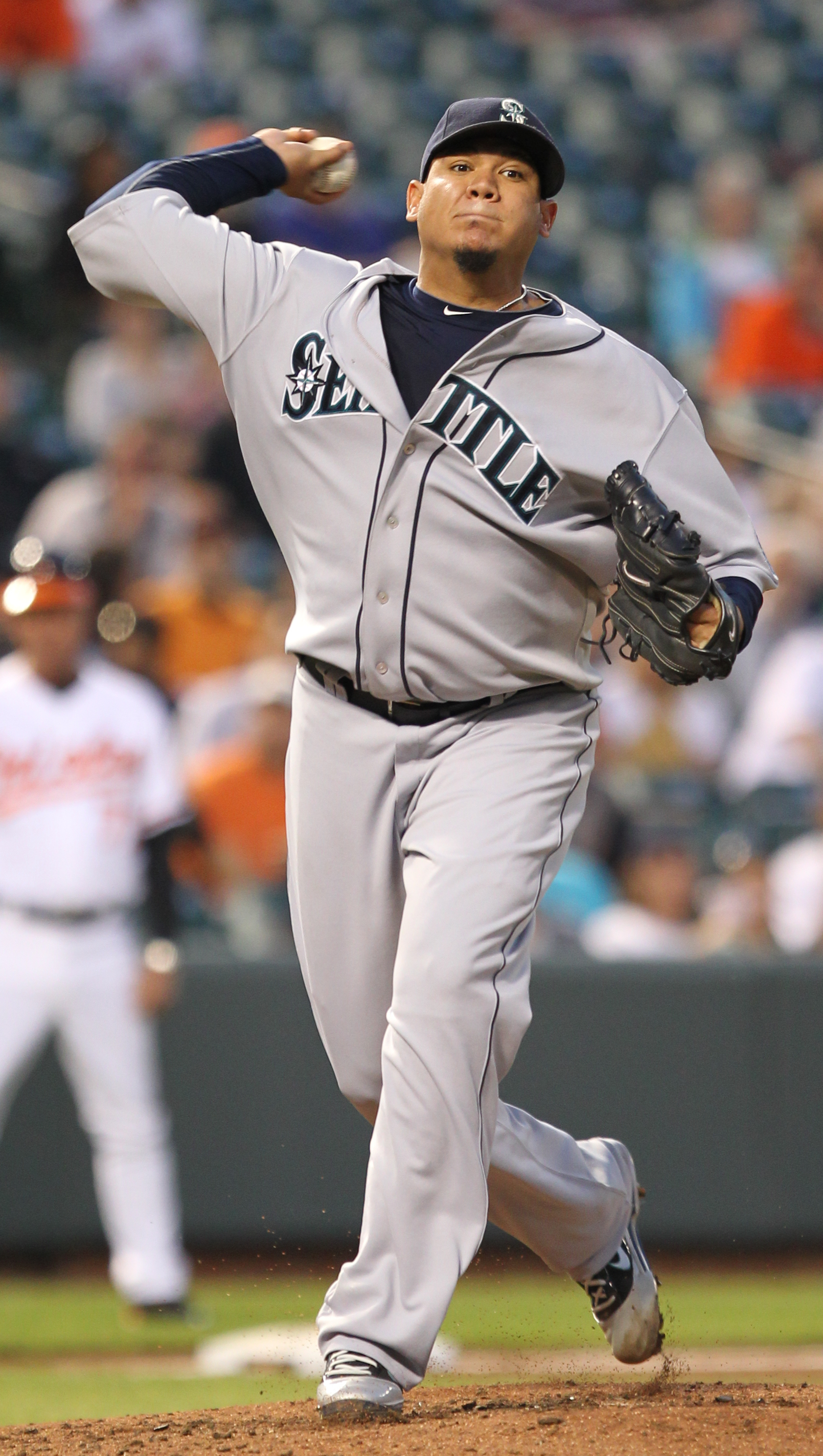
- Hernández with the Seattle Mariners in 2011
- Pitcher
- Born: April 8, 1986 (age 40); Valencia, Venezuela
- Batted: Right Threw: Right

MLB debut
- August 4, 2005, for the Seattle Mariners

Last MLB appearance
- September 26, 2019, for the Seattle Mariners

MLB statistics
- Win–loss record: 169–136
- Earned run average: 3.42
- Strikeouts: 2,524
- Stats at Baseball Reference

Teams
- Seattle Mariners (2005–2019)

Career highlights and awards
- 6× All-Star (2009, 2011–2015); AL Cy Young Award (2010); MLB wins leader (2009); 2× AL ERA leader (2010, 2014); Pitched a perfect game on August 15, 2012; Seattle Mariners Hall of Fame

Félix Abraham Hernández García (born April 8, 1986), nicknamed "King Félix", is a Venezuelan-American former professional baseball pitcher. He played in Major League Baseball (MLB) for the Seattle Mariners from 2005 through 2019. A six-time All-Star, Hernández led MLB in wins in 2009, led the American League (AL) in earned run average in 2010 and 2014, and won the AL Cy Young Award in 2010. He also played on the Venezuela national team at two editions of the World Baseball Classic.

On August 15, 2012, Hernández threw the 23rd perfect game in MLB history, defeating the Tampa Bay Rays at Safeco Field by a 1–0 score. Hernández's perfect game was the first perfect game in franchise history. On April 23, 2016, Hernández claimed the franchise record for strikeouts by a Mariners pitcher, getting his 2,163rd strikeout. The Mariners record had been held by Randy Johnson. Hernández's 146th win, which occurred weeks later on May 9, gave him the club record in that statistic, as well.

For a decade, Hernández was one of the best pitchers in baseball. He was also a fan favorite in Seattle. Known for his durability, Hernández started 30 or more games in 10 consecutive seasons. Beginning at age 30, he experienced a series of injuries, a decrease in fastball velocity, and an increase in ERA. After leaving the Mariners in 2019, Hernández signed with the Atlanta Braves and then with the Baltimore Orioles; however, he did not pitch in the major leagues again. He was inducted into the Mariners Hall of Fame in 2023.

== Early life ==
Hernández was born on April 8, 1986, in Valencia, Venezuela. He was first spotted by Luis Fuenmayor, a part-time Seattle Mariners scout who saw him pitching at age 14 in a tournament near Maracaibo. Fuenmayor recommended Hernández to fellow scouts Pedro Avila and Emilio Carrasquel. The Mariners signed Hernandez as soon as he turned 16, in accordance with MLB rules.

After graduating from high school, Hernández agreed to his first professional contract. Mariners director of international operations Bob Engle signed Hernández as an international free agent on July 4, 2002. Hernández received a signing bonus of $710,000, though he said the Mariners were not the highest bidder. Other teams trying to sign him included the New York Yankees and the Atlanta Braves, with both teams reportedly offering more money than Seattle.

One reason Hernández chose the Mariners was that his idol, fellow Venezuelan pitcher Freddy García, was pitching for the team at the time. His agent, Wil Polidor, also attributed the decision to the influence of Hernández's father, Félix Sr., a trucking business owner who handled negotiations for his son. Engle and other Mariners scouts had cultivated a relationship with the family to explain their plans for Hernández and earn the family's trust.

== Professional career ==
=== Seattle Mariners ===
==== Minor leagues ====
In 2003, Hernández pitched to a 7–2 mark for the Class A Everett AquaSox and Wisconsin Timber Rattlers. He was dubbed "King Felix" by the U.S.S. Mariner blog in his first season in the United States.

Hernández was named the Mariners' minor league pitcher of the year in 2004, a season that also saw him pitch in the All-Star Futures Game. He started the season with the Inland Empire 66ers in the California League before being promoted to the Double-A San Antonio Missions. He finished a combined 14–4 with a 2.95 ERA and 172 strikeouts in 149 1/3 innings pitched.

At the beginning of 2005, Baseball America named Hernández the best pitching prospect in baseball and the second-best overall prospect behind future Hall of Famer Joe Mauer. In 2005, Hernández posted a 9–4 record with a league-leading 2.25 ERA and 100 strikeouts in 88 innings for the Triple-A Tacoma Rainiers. He was selected for the Triple-A All-Star Game but did not participate due to injury. He was also named the Pacific Coast League (PCL) Rookie of the Year and Pitcher of the Year.

==== 2005 season: MLB debut ====
Soon after returning from his injury, Hernández was called up to the major leagues by the Mariners. He made his debut on August 4, 2005, in a 3–1 loss in a road game against the Detroit Tigers. At 19 years, 118 days, he was the youngest pitcher to appear in the majors since José Rijo in 1984. Hernández earned his first major league win in his next outing on August 9, pitching eight shutout innings in a 1–0 victory at home over the Minnesota Twins. Over his first several starts, he registered a streak of 112 batters faced before he allowed his first extra-base hit, a double by Jermaine Dye of the Chicago White Sox. In 12 starts, Hernández posted a 4–4 record with 77 strikeouts and a 2.67 ERA. With 84 1/3 innings pitched, he exhausted his rookie eligibility.

After the season, Hernández became the focus of a disagreement over the possibility of his pitching in the 2006 World Baseball Classic. Although he was placed on a provisional roster by the Venezuela national team, the Mariners objected, citing his earlier injury and expressing concern about the stress on his arm from adding this competition to the demands of a full season in the major leagues at such a young age. Their appeal to the WBC technical committee was eventually upheld.

When he debuted in the major leagues, Hernández was given uniform number 59. In 2006, he switched to number 34, the same number Freddy García (since traded to the Chicago White Sox) had worn as a Mariner.

==== 2006 season ====
For his first full year in the major leagues, Hernández arrived in spring training out of shape and had his preparation for the season interrupted by shin splints. He recovered in time to begin the season in the starting rotation, where he often struggled, but occasionally showed flashes of the potential that had generated such hype.

He threw his first career complete game on June 11, beating the Los Angeles Angels of Anaheim by a score of 6–2. On August 27, once more against the Angels, Hernández registered his first shutout, needing only 95 pitches and allowing five hits while picking up four strikeouts. The game, which lasted only 1 hour, 51 minutes, was the shortest in the history of Safeco Field.

Concerned about avoiding possible injury to their young pitcher, the Mariners declared that they would limit Hernández to 200 innings pitched, including both the regular season and spring training. This required them to skip his turn in the rotation a couple times as the season went on, after the Mariners fell out of contention. To allow him to make one last start at the end of the year, the team decided to raise the limit to 205. His 191 regular-season innings still led the team, and he finished 12–14 with a 4.52 ERA. His 12 victories and 176 strikeouts also led the Mariner pitching staff. He also threw the fastest fastball of all major league starters in 2006, averaging 95.2 miles per hour (153.2 km/h).

During the offseason, Hernández returned to his parents' home in a modest Valencia neighborhood, while awaiting completion of a house for himself, his girlfriend, and daughter. At the team's insistence, he did not pitch in the Venezuelan winter league, unlike his older brother Moises, a pitching prospect trying to crack the majors with the Atlanta Braves. A Seattle Times profile of his life in Venezuela, with its relaxed daily routine, raised eyebrows among those who remained concerned about his conditioning. The team later explained that he had been specifically instructed to rest for two weeks after the season. He then picked up a workout regimen, including an improved diet, daily running, and regular weight training, to lose about 20 pounds. This put Hernández in much better physical condition upon his return to the U.S. in January, when he began a throwing program in advance of spring training.

==== 2007 season: First Opening Day start ====
Based on his improved condition and a successful spring training, the Mariners indicated that in 2007 they would no longer limit the number of innings Hernández could pitch, focusing instead on pitch counts to avoid overuse. Hernández won the honor of being named the team's Opening Day starter. He became the youngest pitcher chosen for this assignment since Dwight Gooden in 1985. He pitched eight innings of a 4–0 victory over the Oakland A's, allowing three hits and two walks while setting a career-high with 12 strikeouts.

Hernández thrust himself into the national spotlight with his next start on April 11 against the Boston Red Sox, a much-hyped duel with Japanese rookie Daisuke Matsuzaka, who was making his home debut at Fenway Park. Hernández lived up to his end and upstaged the matchup of Matsuzaka pitching to his countryman, Ichiro Suzuki, by hurling no-hit ball for seven innings, finishing with a one-hit, complete-game shutout in a 3–0 victory.

During the first inning of his next start against Minnesota, he was removed from the game because of increasing tightness in his right elbow, especially when throwing his slider. After undergoing an MRI exam that night, he was examined the next day and was diagnosed with a strained flexor-pronator muscle in his forearm and was placed on the disabled list. Two planned returns were put off as the team took a cautious approach in bringing him back, although it opted not to send him to the minor leagues for a rehabilitation assignment. Instead, he was activated on May 15 and kept on a reduced pitch count initially.

Upon his return, Hernández initially battled to regain the form he had in his first two 2007 starts. He finished the season with a 14–7 record. His victory over the New York Yankees on September 3, in his first appearance at Yankee Stadium, stopped a nine-game Mariner losing streak but was not enough to keep the team from falling out of playoff contention. His 3.92 ERA for the season was the best among Seattle starters, and he again led the Mariners in strikeouts with 165. He again threw the fastest fastball of all major league starters in 2007, averaging 95.6 miles per hour (153.9 km/h).

==== 2008 season: immaculate inning and grand slam ====
On June 17, Hernández became the 13th AL pitcher to throw an "immaculate inning" (striking out the side on exactly nine pitches). He did this in the fourth inning of a start against the Florida Marlins. On June 23, in his only at bat of the season, Hernández hit his only major league home run, a grand slam, off fellow Venezuelan Johan Santana of the New York Mets. Hernández became the first American League (AL) pitcher to hit a grand slam since Cleveland's Steve Dunning on May 11, 1971 and was the first to do so since interleague play and the DH rule began. It was also the first home run ever hit by a Mariners pitcher. Later in that game, Carlos Beltrán slid into Hernández as he covered home plate, injuring the pitcher's left ankle. He was forced to leave the game and was placed on the 15-day disabled list. He finished the season batting a perfect 4.000 slugging percentage.

Hernández finished the season with a 9–11 record posting 3.45 ERA and 175 strikeouts. He again threw the fastest fastball of all AL starters, averaging 94.6 miles per hour (152.2 km/h).

==== 2009 season: first All-Star Game ====
In January 2009, Hernández avoided arbitration and agreed to a one-year, $3.8 million deal. He got off to a fast start, starting the season with a 4–0 record, only to fall cold in May, going 1–3. After a particularly sloppy loss against the Anaheim Angels, manager Don Wakamatsu publicly called him out for not "stepping up" as an ace. Hernández would lose just two games during the rest of the year.

On June 19 against the San Diego Padres, Hernández threw a two-hit shutout. This was his first complete game of the season and one of the best starts of his career. His sizzling performance in June (3–0 record, 0.93 ERA, 35 strikeouts) would earn him the AL Pitcher of the Month award for June. On July 5, Hernández was selected along with outfielder Ichiro Suzuki as the Mariners representatives in the MLB All Star Game. He made the first All-Star appearance of his career in the sixth inning, tossing a hitless inning.{{

By the All-Star break, Hernández was 9–3 with a 2.53 ERA while striking out 122 batters in 124 2/3 innings pitched. At the age of 23 years, he became one of the youngest and fastest pitchers to strikeout 600 batters since Gooden. He would reach 800 strikeouts by season's end.

During the 2009 season, Hernández set career bests in wins, strikeouts, innings pitched, and earned run average. Hernández finished the season 19–5 with a 2.49 ERA and 217 strikeouts and was in strong contention for the AL Cy Young Award. He finished second in the award voting behind Zack Greinke.

One striking aspect of this season is concerning him being provided just 4.37 runs per 27 outs in games pitched, the least among seasons for pitchers leading the majors in wins since Jim Palmer in 1976 for a 162 game season.

==== 2010 season: Cy Young Award ====
On January 21, 2010, the Mariners and Hernández agreed to a five-year contract extension worth about $78 million, which added to the team's busy offseason, with the Mariners trading for Cliff Lee and Milton Bradley. On June 3, Hernández struck out four batters in one inning. He did so by striking out Joe Mauer on a wild pitch before striking out Justin Morneau. He was the third Mariner to accomplish this feat.

On August 25, Hernández struck out David Ortiz to record his 1,000th career strikeout. He became the fourth youngest pitcher, behind Bob Feller,Bert Blyleven, and Gooden.

Hernández faced the Rangers on September 17, and was working on a no-hitter until Nelson Cruz broke it up with a home run in the eighth inning. In his next start, he threw a complete-game two-hitter in Toronto, surrendering only one run on José Bautista's 50th home run of the year in the first inning. The Mariners offense, however, was shut out by Blue Jays pitching, and Hernández was dealt his 12th loss of the season. Ten of Hernández's 12 losses were in games where the Mariners were shut out or scored only one run, and four other times, relievers blew a lead he turned over to them.

Despite the lackluster win–loss record, Hernández won the AL Cy Young Award on the strength of all of his other stats, leading the league in ERA, innings pitched, innings per start, quality starts, fewest hits per nine innings, and batters faced while placing second in strikeouts, walks plus hits per inning pitched (WHIP), and complete games. Hernández finished the season 13–12 with a 2.27 ERA, 232 strikeouts, and 249 2/3 innings pitched. His 13 wins were the fewest by a starting pitcher to win the Cy Young Award in a full season (Fernando Valenzuela won the award with 13 wins in a strike-shortened season). He was also named the Sporting News AL Pitcher of the Year, and was nominated for a This Year in Baseball Award. The Baseball Prospectus Internet Baseball Awards named him its AL Cy Young Winner.

==== 2011 season: Debut of King's Court ====
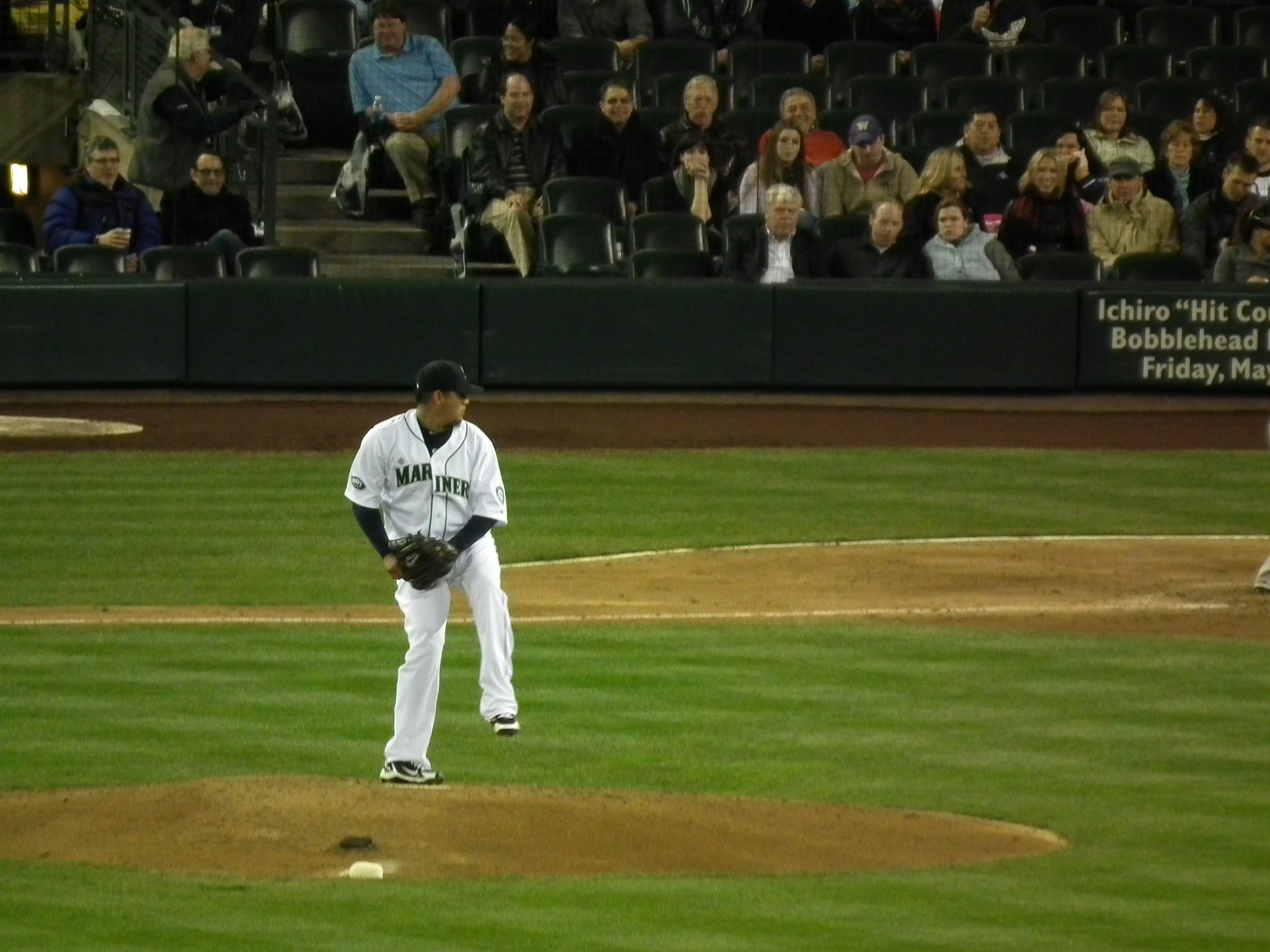
Hernández pitching at Safeco Field in April 2011

On May 28, 2011, a special cheering section for Hernández, dubbed "King's Court", debuted in Safeco Field on the foul territory side of the left field foul pole. The creation of the Mariners marketing director, it marked the first time in MLB that a stadium promotion was designed around a popular player. By popular demand, the cheering section was expanded from two to three sections – Sections 148, 149, and 150 – by the end of the year. Seats were sold at a discount and the ticket price included a yellow "King Félix" T-shirt and a yellow placard imprinted with a large "K" to wave when cheering for strikeouts by Hernández. "King's Court" was typically occupied by about 1,500 fans on days that Hernández started. Hernández reportedly liked the cheering squad but was able to maintain his focus and defer to temptation to throw a fastball on an 0–2 count in response to his cheering fans. Whenever there was a marquee pitching matchup or a big game in which Hernández pitched, another King's Court was added in the upper deck directly above the regular King's Court. These added sections were called the "High Court". The Court remained a fixture throughout Hernández's tenure in Seattle.

Hernández was selected to the All-Star Game for the second time. He represented the Mariners alongside rookie starter Michael Pineda and closer Brandon League.

On August 31, Hernández struck out nine batters, giving him 204 strikeouts to that point in the season. It marked the third consecutive season in which he reached 200 strikeouts.

==== 2012 season: Perfect game ====
Hernández was selected for his third All-Star Game on July 1, 2012. He did not pitch in the July 3 game after AL manager, Ron Washington, stated Hernández's 113 pitches thrown on July 1 was the deciding factor. Hernández pitched his third shutout over his past eight starts when he recorded a 1–0 win over the Yankees on August 4. He gave up two hits and won his sixth decision in a row, the third-longest stretch of his career.

On August 15, Hernández threw the first perfect game in Mariners history and the 23rd perfect game in MLB history. He recorded 12 strikeouts, five of which were in the last two innings, against the Tampa Bay Rays in a 1–0 victory. It was the fourth no-hitter in team history, and Hernández joined Randy Johnson and Chris Bosio as the only Mariners pitchers to throw individual no-hitters. One of the club's no-hitters was combined, needing six pitchers to do so on June 8 against the Dodgers. His perfect game was the last no-hitter thrown in the AL for the next three years, until his teammate, Hisashi Iwakuma succeeded him on August 12, 2015.

Hernández led the AL with five shutouts.

==== 2013 season: Contract extension and fourth All-Star Game ====
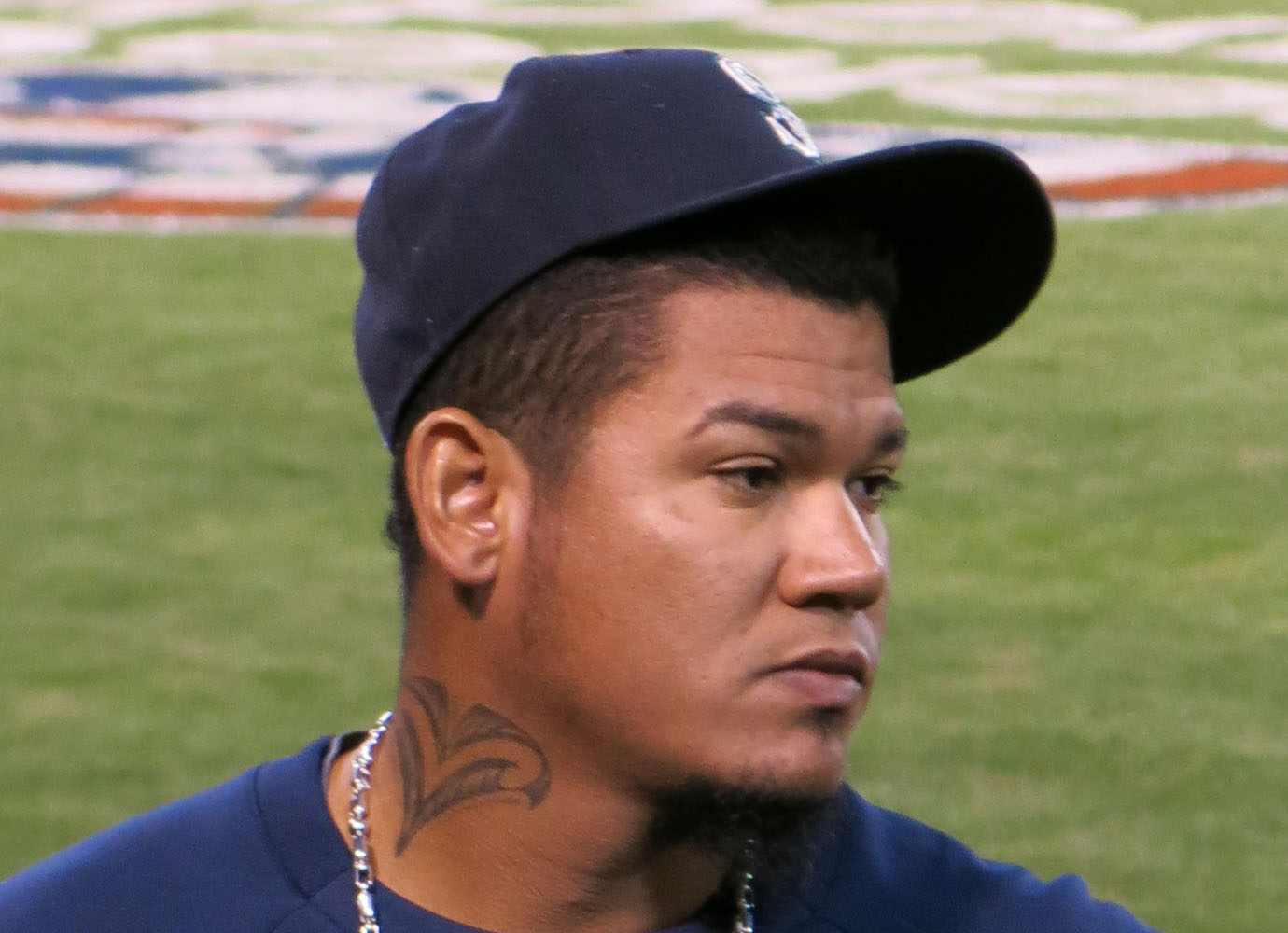
Hernández in 2013

On February 13, 2013, Hernández signed a seven-year extension with the Mariners worth $175 million, voiding the final two years of his previous extension and including a team option for 2020. The contract made him the highest-paid pitcher in major league history until it was surpassed by the $180 million extension signed by Justin Verlander of the Detroit Tigers in March 2013.

On April 22 in a 7–1 win against the Houston Astros, Hernández recorded his 100th career win. In that game, he pitched six innings, allowed five hits, walked one and struck out nine. On July 6, Hernández was selected to his fourth All-Star Game. He pitched in the fourth inning, and allowed one hit but no runs. Hernández had a bad August, going 1–4 with a 5.82 ERA and a .281 on-base percentage. He made only three starts in September while trying to rest his oblique. In 31 starts in 2013, Hernández went 12–10 with a 3.04 ERA and 22 quality starts, striking out 216 in 204 1/3 innings. He was fifth in the AL in strikeouts and sixth in ERA.

==== 2014 season: All-Star Game starter and second ERA title ====
Hernández pitched the Mariners season opener on March 31, 2014 against the Los Angeles Angels of Anaheim. This was the seventh time in a row he started Opening Day for Seattle. He got the win, going 6 innings, giving up three runs (two earned), and struck out 11 Angels. The Mariners won 10–3. He won his next two starts, both against Oakland. However, Hernández would not win again until May 12, going 0–1 in that span.

On May 12, Hernández was ejected for the first time in his career against the Rays at home. When he left the game in the seventh after a three-run double, Hernández started shouting at the home plate umpire in disagreement with his calls. On June 8, Hernández struck out a career-high 15 batters against the Rays in a 5–0 win. Hernández got a no-decision, as all five runs were scored after he left the game. Hernández got his tenth win on June 29, against the Cleveland Indians in a 3–0 victory in eight shutout innings with just one hit. Fernando Rodney got his 23rd save pitching a perfect ninth inning to secure the victory.

Hernández was announced as an All-Star along with teammates Robinson Canó, Kyle Seager and Rodney. On July 14, AL manager John Farrell announced that Hernández would be the starter for the game. Hernández pitched the first inning of the All-Star Game, he gave up one infield base hit and struck out two batters. From May 18 to August 11, Hernández pitched 16 collectieve outings going at least seven innings and allowing at most two runs each start. This is the longest such streak in baseball history, topping the record of 13 by Tom Seaver in 1971. This streak was snapped on August 16 against the Detroit Tigers. He gave up two earned runs in five innings, throwing 92 pitches.

Hernández won his second AL ERA title with a 2.14 ERA, three points less than Chicago White Sox pitcher Chris Sale. He secured the ERA title on the last day of the season, on September 28 against the Angels, throwing 5 1/3 innings allowing no runs and seven strikeouts. Hernández had the lowest single-season ERA and WHIP (0.92) by an AL pitcher since Pedro Martínez in 2000. He finished second in AL Cy Young Award voting behind Cleveland's Corey Kluber.

==== 2015 season: Final All-Star selection ====
Hernández started on Opening Day for the sixth season in a row. Despite giving up Mike Trout's first home run of the season (Trout's first 2014 and 2015 at bats were home runs off of Hernández), he beat the Angels 4–1 with 7 innings pitched, two hits, one earned run, and struck out 10 Angels. On May 10 against Oakland, Hernández recorded his 2,000th strikeout, becoming the fourth-youngest player to reach that milestone. Hernández was selected as an All-Star along with teammate Nelson Cruz by manager Ned Yost. This was his fifth straight All-Star selection and sixth and final overall selection.

The season was not without its struggles for Hernández. Finishing the first two months of the season 8–1 with a 1.91 ERA, Hernández gave up 7 runs to the New York Yankees at home on June 1. On June 12, in a game against the Houston Astros, he gave up eight earned runs while only recording one out, matching the shortest outing of his career and recording a game score of 8, the second-lowest of his career. The outing increased his ERA from 2.51 to 3.38. On August 15, exactly three years to the day he threw a perfect game against Tampa Bay, he allowed a career-high 10 runs against the Boston Red Sox in only 2 1/3 innings, recording a new career-low game score of −6. His ERA went up from 3.11 to 3.65.

Hernández finished the season 18–9 with a 3.53 ERA, which was the worst ERA for Hernández ever since the 2008 season but the most wins since his 2009 season, this time being provided with just 4.10 runs per 27 outs. He failed to reach 200 strikeouts for the first time in six years; he had191 strikeouts in 201 innings pitched.

==== 2016 season: Franchise strikeout and win records ====
Hernández started on Opening Day again on April 4. He would lose for the first time ever on Opening Day, pitching six innings, walking five and striking out six. He gave up three runs, one earned. It was hos his ninth Opening Day start, the most by any MLB pitcher before his 30th birthday.

Two starts later at Yankee Stadium, Hernández tied Randy Johnson for most strikeouts as a Mariner, with 2,162, striking out Didi Gregorius looking. The next start, Hernández surpassed Randy Johnson's record for most strikeouts in franchise history by striking out Rafael Ortega of the Los Angeles Angels in the first inning. On May 9, Hernández recorded the 146th win of his career against the Tampa Bay Rays, surpassing Jamie Moyer for most wins for Seattle. On June 1, Hernández was placed on the 15-day disabled list due to a right calf strain after jumping up to celebrate a home run. On August 15, he earned his 150th career win, defeating the Angels by a score of 3–2. This milestone win occurred on the fourth anniversary of his perfect game.

Hernández finished the season with an 11–8 record and 3.82 ERA.

==== 2017 season: shoulder injury ====
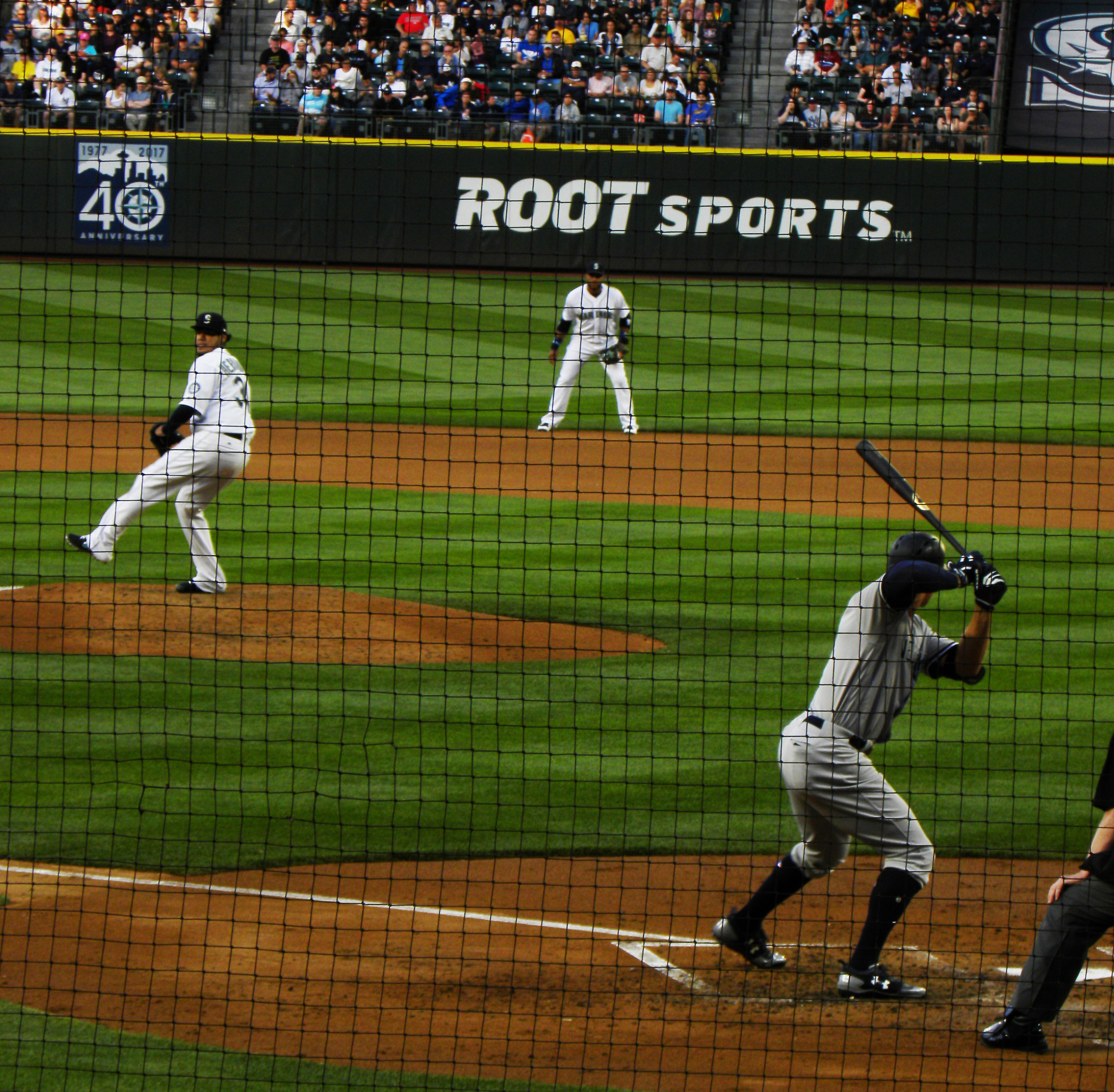
Hernández (left) prepares to deliver to Aaron Judge of the New York Yankees on August 20, 2017.

On April 25, 2017, Hernández was removed from the game after an apparent shoulder injury. The next day, further tests revealed that he was diagnosed with right shoulder inflammation, which landed him on the 10-day disabled list. After spending two months on the disabled list, he was activated on the weekend of June 24, winning a game against the Astros 13–3 and striking out eight batters. On August 5, Hernández was placed on the disabled list again, due to right biceps tendinitis. It was later revealed that he would miss from three-to-four weeks due to right shoulder bursitis.

In 2017, Hernández went 6–5 with a 4.36 ERA.

==== 2018 season: Final Opening Day start ====
On February 26, 2018, Hernández was removed from a spring training game against the Chicago Cubs. He was struck on his throwing arm after a comeback hit from Cubs catcher Victor Caratini. Hernández was diagnosed with a contusion on his right forearm. He was listed as out for at least 10 days, though two weeks was the expected timetable for return.

On March 29, Hernández made his tenth Opening Day start in a row. Only Jack Morris, Robin Roberts and Tom Seaver have made more consecutive Opening Day starts. He pitched 5 1/3 innings, giving up no earned runs on two hits, two walks, and four strikeouts in a 2–1 win. On July 10, because of a back injury, he was placed on the disabled list for the third consecutive season.

On August 7, Hernández allowed 11 runs in six innings in a loss to Texas. On August 9, manager Scott Servais removed Hernández from the starting rotation. He made his first appearance as a reliever on August 14 against the A's when starter James Paxton was struck by a line drive. Hernández returned to the rotation with Paxton on the disabled list. Hernández finished the season with an 8–14 record and 5.55 ERA in 155 2/3 innings.

==== 2019 season: Final MLB season ====
On March 9, Servais announced that Marco Gonzales would be the Opening Day starter in Tokyo, Japan, ending Hernández's streak of 10 consecutive Opening Day starts, a feat which had been accomplished by only six other MLB pitchers. Hernández began his season against the Los Angeles Angels as the Mariners' number 5 starter in the rotation, pitching 5 1/3 innings allowing 3 runs (only 1 earned) on 7 hits and 4 strikeouts.

On May 11 against the Boston Red Sox, Hernández recorded his 2,500th strikeout by striking out Michael Chavis, becoming the sixth-youngest pitcher in MLB history to reach the 2,500 strikeout mark. However, he was placed on the 10-day injured list after the start with a right shoulder strain. In June, he went on a rehabilitation assignment with the Triple-A Tacoma Rainiers. On September 26, Hernández pitched in his final MLB game in a 3–1 loss to the Oakland Athletics. In the game, he threw for 5 1/3 innings, gave up 5 hits, 3 runs and walked 4 batters while striking out 3. Hernández ended the 2019 season with a 1–8 record, 57 strikeouts, and an ERA of 6.40 in 71 2/3 innings. On October 31, Hernández became a free agent at age 33.

=== Atlanta Braves ===
On January 20, 2020, Hernández signed a minor league contract worth $1 million with the Atlanta Braves. On July 4, Hernández announced that he had decided not to play in the 2020 season due to concerns about the COVID-19 pandemic. He became a free agent on November 2.

=== Baltimore Orioles ===
On February 3, 2021, Hernández signed a minor league contract with the Baltimore Orioles organization. Hernández pitched for Baltimore during spring training, but suffered an elbow injury in mid-March. On March 29, Hernández opted out of his contract with the Orioles and became a free agent.

== International career ==
Hernández pitched for Venezuela in the 2009 World Baseball Classic (WBC). In his first outing, he pitched four innings in relief, surrendering only one hit while not allowing a run. In his next game, Hernández shut out Puerto Rico over 4 2/3 innings. He skipped the 2013, citing ongoing contract negotiations with the Mariners. Hernández pitched in the 2017 World Baseball Classic. He was 0–1 with allowing one earned run in two starts.

Hernández was named to a provisional roster for Venezuela for the 2006 WBC, but did not pitch in the tournament following an appeal by the Mariners.

== Player profile ==
Hernández threw a sinker (two-seam fastball), a slider (he avoided the slider early in his career because the team was concerned it might injure his arm), a changeup, and a curveball. In 2016, his sinker averaged about 90–92 mph; four-seam fastball at 90–92 mph; slider at 84–86 mph; curveball at 79–81 mph; changeup at 87-88 mph; and the occasional cut fastball at 88–90 mph. The changeup was his most commonly used two-strike pitch, and had the highest whiff rate of his pitches.

When at his best, Hernández could induce a steady procession of groundball outs and strikeouts, with very few balls being hit in the air. For example, in his perfect game, Hernández only allowed five batted balls to leave the infield, and after the third inning, no balls left the infield with the exception of one Ben Zobrist flyout. Meanwhile, he forced eight groundouts and struck out 12 batters.

Like some pitchers, Hernández wore a long-sleeved undershirt beneath his jersey. While typically this is done to keep the pitcher's arm from getting chilled, Hernández wore it even in the hottest weather. For him, it served to keep perspiration from running down his arms and interfering with his grip on the baseball.

== Legacy ==
Hernández appeared on the National Baseball Hall of Fame ballot for the first time in 2025 and received 20.6 percent of the votes, making him eligible for future ballots. In 2026, he received 46.1% percent of the vote, the largest gain on a Hall of Fame ballot year-over-year since 1967.

Hernández was inducted into the Seattle Mariners Hall of Fame on August 12, 2023, and also made the first ceremonial pitch of Game 3 of the 2022 AL Division Series against the Astros. In 2026, he was named one of the 50 greatest Mariners players.

In 2025, Hernández was inducted into the Venezuelan Baseball Hall of Fame.

== Personal life ==
Hernández and his wife have two children. They reside in Clyde Hill, Washington. His relatives call him by his middle name, Abraham. Hernandez's older brother, Moises, spent 12 seasons pitching in Minor League Baseball in various organizations, including the Mariners.

Hernández has two dogs, King and Oreo, and he is a spokesman for the Seattle King County Humane Society. Hernández was also the Mariners Ambassador for the Pepsi Refresh Project, raising money for the Washington State Coalition Against Domestic Violence.

In September 2018, Hernández became a naturalized United States citizen.

== See also ==
- List of Major League Baseball career strikeout leaders
- List of Major League Baseball no-hitters
- List of Major League Baseball perfect games
- List of Major League Baseball players from Venezuela
- List of Major League Baseball single-inning strikeout leaders
- List of Seattle Mariners no-hitters
- List of Seattle Mariners team records
- Seattle Mariners award winners and league leaders

Achievements
Preceded by Matt Cain	Perfect game pitcher August 15, 2012	Succeeded by Domingo Germán
Preceded by Matt Cain	No-hitter pitcher August 15, 2012	Succeeded by Homer Bailey
