= David González =

David González or Gonzales may refer to:

- David M. Gonzales (1923–1945), American soldier in World War II, Medal of Honor recipient
- David Gonzalez (storyteller) (born 1956), American multidisciplinary artist
- David Gonzalez (journalist), American journalist
- Dave Gonzalez (guitarist) (born 1961), member of The Paladins and the Hacienda Brothers
- David Gonzales (cartoonist) (born 1964), Mexican-American cartoonist, creator of the "Homies"
- David Luis Gonzalez (born 1968 or 1969), artist and activist
- David González (footballer, born 1981), Spanish football player
- David González (footballer, born 1982), Colombian football goalkeeper
- David González (football manager) (born 1985), Spanish football manager
- David González (footballer, born 1986), Spanish-born Swiss football goalkeeper
- David González (skateboarder) (born 1990), Colombian professional skateboarder
- David González (footballer, born 1993), Spanish footballer
- David González (cyclist) (born 1996), Spanish cyclist
- David González (footballer, born 2002), Spanish footballer
- Maxi González (David Maximiliano González, born 2004), Argentine footballer
