= Hisashi Iwakuma =

Japanese baseball player (born 1981)

Hisashi Iwakuma 岩隈 久志
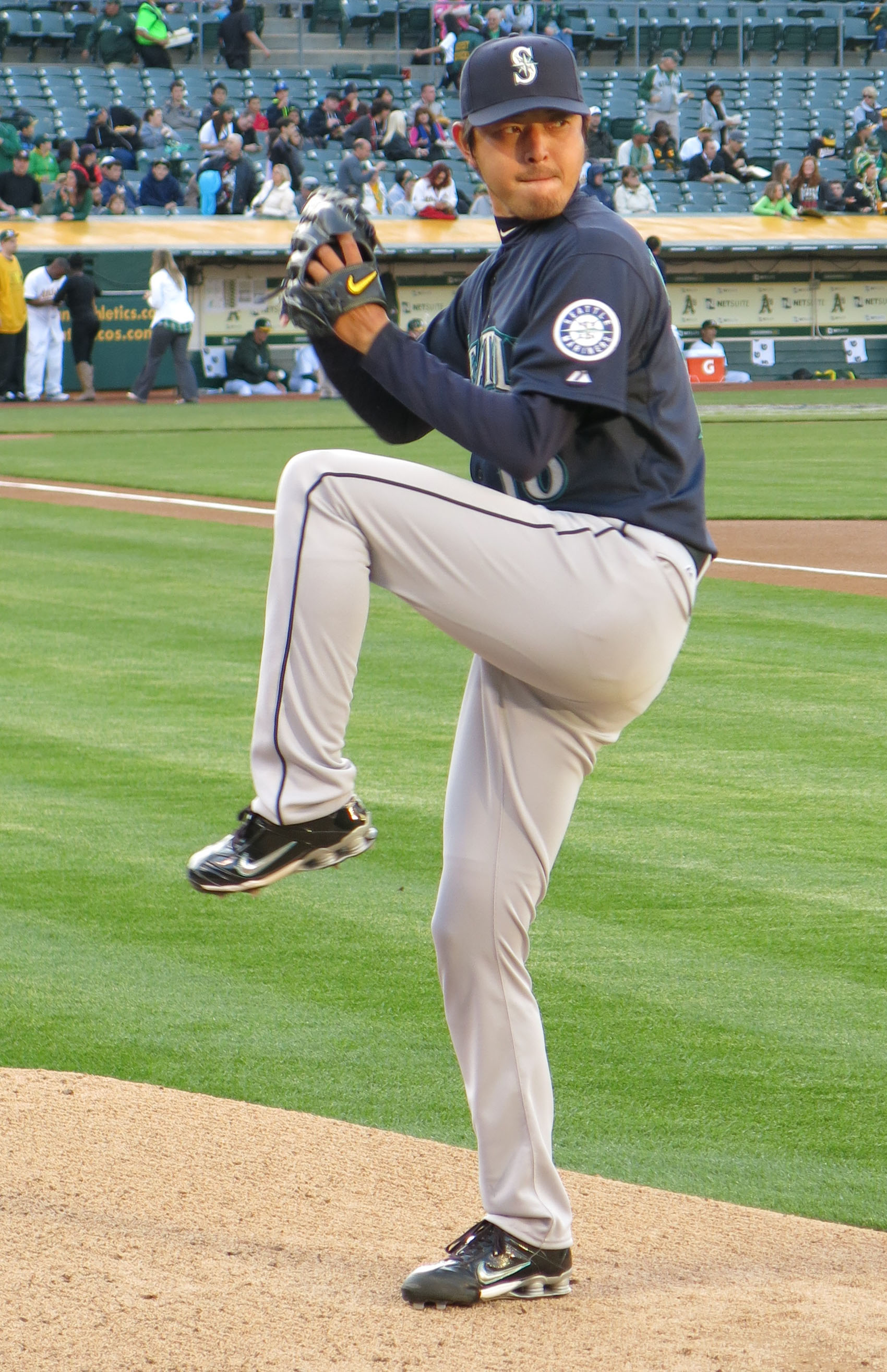
- Iwakuma with the Seattle Mariners in 2013
- Pitcher
- Born: April 12, 1981 (age 45); Higashiyamato, Tokyo, Japan
- Batted: Right Threw: Right

Professional debut
- NPB: May 29, 2001, for the Osaka Kintetsu Buffaloes
- MLB: April 20, 2012, for the Seattle Mariners

Last appearance
- NPB: October 7, 2011, for the Tohoku Rakuten Golden Eagles
- MLB: May 3, 2017, for the Seattle Mariners

NPB statistics
- Win–loss record: 107–69
- Earned run average: 3.25
- Strikeouts: 1,175

MLB statistics
- Win–loss record: 63–39
- Earned run average: 3.42
- Strikeouts: 714
- Stats at Baseball Reference

Teams
- Osaka Kintetsu Buffaloes (2000–2004); Tohoku Rakuten Golden Eagles (2005–2011); Seattle Mariners (2012–2017)

Career highlights and awards
- NPB: 3× All-Star (2003, 2004, 2008); Pacific League MVP (2008); Eiji Sawamura Award (2008); 2× Best Nine Award (2004, 2008); 2× Pacific League wins leader (2004, 2008); Pacific League ERA leader (2008); MLB: All-Star (2013); Pitched a no-hitter on August 12, 2015
Medals
Men's baseball
Representing Japan
World Baseball Classic
Gold medal – first place	2009 Los Angeles	Team competition
Olympic Games
Bronze medal – third place	2004 Athens	Team competition

Hisashi Iwakuma (岩隈 久志, Iwakuma Hisashi; born April 12, 1981) is a Japanese former professional baseball pitcher. He played in Nippon Professional Baseball (NPB) for the Osaka Kintetsu Buffaloes from 2000 to 2004, Tohoku Rakuten Golden Eagles from 2005 to 2011, and Yomiuri Giants in 2019, and all of his time in Major League Baseball (MLB) for the Seattle Mariners from 2012 to 2017. Iwakuma retired in 2020 due to lingering shoulder issues that had prevented him from playing that year.

Iwakuma made his professional debut with the Buffaloes in 2000. He was named a NPB All-Star in 2003 and 2004, and played in the 2004 Athens Olympics. He joined the Eagles in 2005. As the Eagles' reigning staff ace, Iwakuma won the Eiji Sawamura Award in 2008, and was also a NPB All-Star that year. He appeared in the 2009 World Baseball Classic for Japan.

Iwakuma was posted to MLB after the 2010 season, but he failed to come to an agreement with the winning bidder. After the 2011 season, Iwakuma signed with the Mariners. He was an All-Star in 2013, as well as the third-place finisher for the 2013 American League Cy Young Award.

On August 12, 2015, Iwakuma became the second Japanese player ever to pitch a no-hitter in MLB (joining Hideo Nomo, who threw two), throwing a three-walk, seven-strikeout 3–0 win over the Baltimore Orioles at Safeco Field. It was also his first MLB complete game and the Mariners' fifth no-hitter in team history.

== Early life ==
Iwakuma was born in Higashiyamato, Tokyo, and began playing baseball in the first grade before attending Horikoshi High School in Nakano. Iwakuma was inspired to become a pitcher after "looking up to" former Seibu Lions great Hisanobu Watanabe, who was known for his big-game pitching. While he never made it to a national tournament during his high school career, he led his team to the semi-finals of the West Tokyo Tournament as a senior in the summer of 1999.

== Professional career ==
=== Osaka Kintetsu Buffaloes ===
The Osaka Kintetsu Buffaloes picked him in the fifth round of the 1999 NPB draft.

==== Early years: 2000–2003 ====
Iwakuma spent the entirety of his rookie season (2000) with the Buffaloes' nigun (Japanese for "minor league" or "farm team") team, clocking 149 km/h (93 mph) with his fastball at one point but making only two appearances all year in the Western League.

Iwakuma made his debut at the ichigun ("major league") level the following year, appearing in relief in a game against the Nippon-Ham Fighters on May 29 2001 and earning the first career win of his professional career despite giving up a run over 1 2/3 innings. He made his first start on June 10 against the Fighters and threw his first career complete game (a two-hit shutout) against the Seibu Lions on September 18, finishing the year with a 4–2 record and playing an important role in the Buffaloes' league title that year.

Iwakuma secured a spot in the team's starting rotation by 2002, the following season, going 8–7 with a much-improved 3.69 ERA in 141 1/3 innings. He enjoyed a breakout year in 2003, going 15–10 with a 3.45 ERA and 149 strikeouts and leading the league with 11 complete games.

==== 2004 ====
Iwakuma began the 2004 season 12–0 and establishing a franchise record for most consecutive wins to start the season. He received the most fan votes among Pacific League starting pitchers for the NPB All-Star Game that year, starting Game 1 at Nagoya Dome on July 10, and pitched in the 2004 Athens Olympics as a member of the Japanese national team in August. He finished with a 15–2 record for the year, leading the league in both wins and winning percentage (.882) for the first time in his career. He also pitched in Game 5 of the MLB All-Star Series held in November, holding the MLB All-Stars to one run over seven innings to earn the win.

Following the 2004 season, Iwakuma's Buffaloes and the Orix BlueWave, another Pacific League team based in the Kansai region, opted to merge to alleviate some of their financial difficulties, later leading to the addition of a new team named the Tohoku Rakuten Golden Eagles that would fill the void created by the merger. Iwakuma was initially named a member of the newly formed Orix Buffaloes in a dispersal draft held that November, but refused to comply and join the Buffaloes and became involved in a contractual dispute. Although the Buffaloes attempted to persuade him to play for their team, they eventually agreed to trade him to the Eagles in exchange for cash.

=== Tohoku Rakuten Golden Eagles ===
==== 2005–2007: Injury Woes ====
Iwakuma was named the Eagles' starter for the 2005 season opener, holding the Chiba Lotte Marines to one run while going the distance on March 26 and earning the expansion team's first-ever win. However, while he did not miss a single start during the regular season, he was bothered by tenderness in his shoulder throughout the year, finishing with a 9–15 record and an ERA of 4.99 (worst among all qualifying pitchers).

Iwakuma's injury woes continued into the 2006 season. His struggles to adapt to the league's new rules on pitching motions during Spring training, combined with lingering concerns about his shoulder condition, caused him to miss the season opener and spend the entire first half of the season with the nigun team undergoing a rehab stint. He made his first appearance of the season against the Fighters on August 29, but did not record a win until September 12 in a game against the Marines, finishing the season with a 1–2 record and 3.72 ERA in just six starts.

In 2007, Iwakuma was named the starter for the season opener for the first time in two years, taking the mound on March 24 against the Lions. While he was slated to start the Eagles' first home game of the season on March 31 against the Buffaloes as well, he reported stiffness in his back just hours before the game, causing him to be scratched from the lineup and sent down to the minors for rehab the next day. He returned at the end of April only to be demoted again just weeks later with a left oblique strain. Iwakuma finally returned after the All-Star break, notching his second win of the season on July 31 and finishing the season with a 5–5 record in 16 games and an ERA of 3.40. He underwent arthroscopic surgery on his right elbow in October.

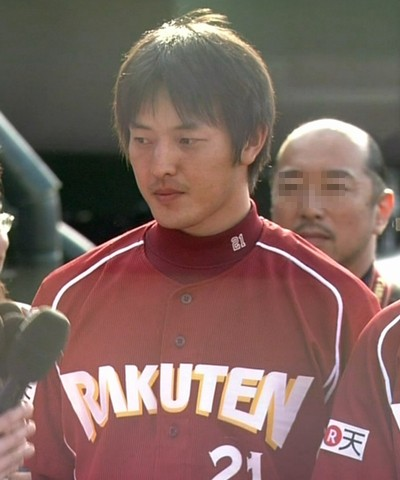
Iwakuma in 2008.

==== 2008 season ====
Chosen to start the season opener for the second straight year (and fourth time overall), Iwakuma pitched against the Fukuoka SoftBank Hawks on March 20, 2008, but fell short of the win despite limiting the Hawks to just one run over seven innings (then-closer Domingo Guzmán gave up a walk-off home run to outfielder Hiroshi Shibahara, handing Iwakuma a no-decision in a 4–3 loss). However, he recorded his first complete game shutout with the Eagles in his next start on March 27 against the Buffaloes and recorded his 10th win of the season in another complete game shutout against the Yomiuri Giants in an interleague game on June 15, marking the first time he had reached double-digit wins since 2003, when he was still with the Buffaloes. Though he expressed disappointment that he was not chosen to play in the 2008 Beijing Olympics as a member of the national team (even though he ranked among the league leaders in several categories at the time), he notched his 16th win of the season, a new career high, on August 16 against the Marines, passing 1000 career innings pitched in that same game.

On September 22, in a game against the Saitama Seibu Lions, Iwakuma threw seven innings of one-run ball to become the first 20-game winner in the Pacific League since Hawks right-hander Kazumi Saito achieved the feat in 2003. He picked up one more win on October 5 against the Hawks, becoming the first 21-game winner in 23 years (former Hankyu Braves right-hander Yoshinori Satoh won 21 games in 1985) and passing young rival and fellow ace Yu Darvish of the Fighters to lead the league in ERA (1.87) in his final start of the season.

Iwakuma finished his dominant 2008 campaign with a 21–4 record, leading the league in wins, ERA, and winning percentage (.840). He gave up just three home runs in 201 2/3 innings all year, of which just one was to a Pacific League hitter (the other two were given up in interleague games), and won nearly one-third of the Eagles' 65 wins in the regular season himself. He was presented the Sawamura, Most Valuable Player and Best Nine awards at the end of the season, a rare accomplishment for a player on a fifth-place team.

==== 2009–2011 ====
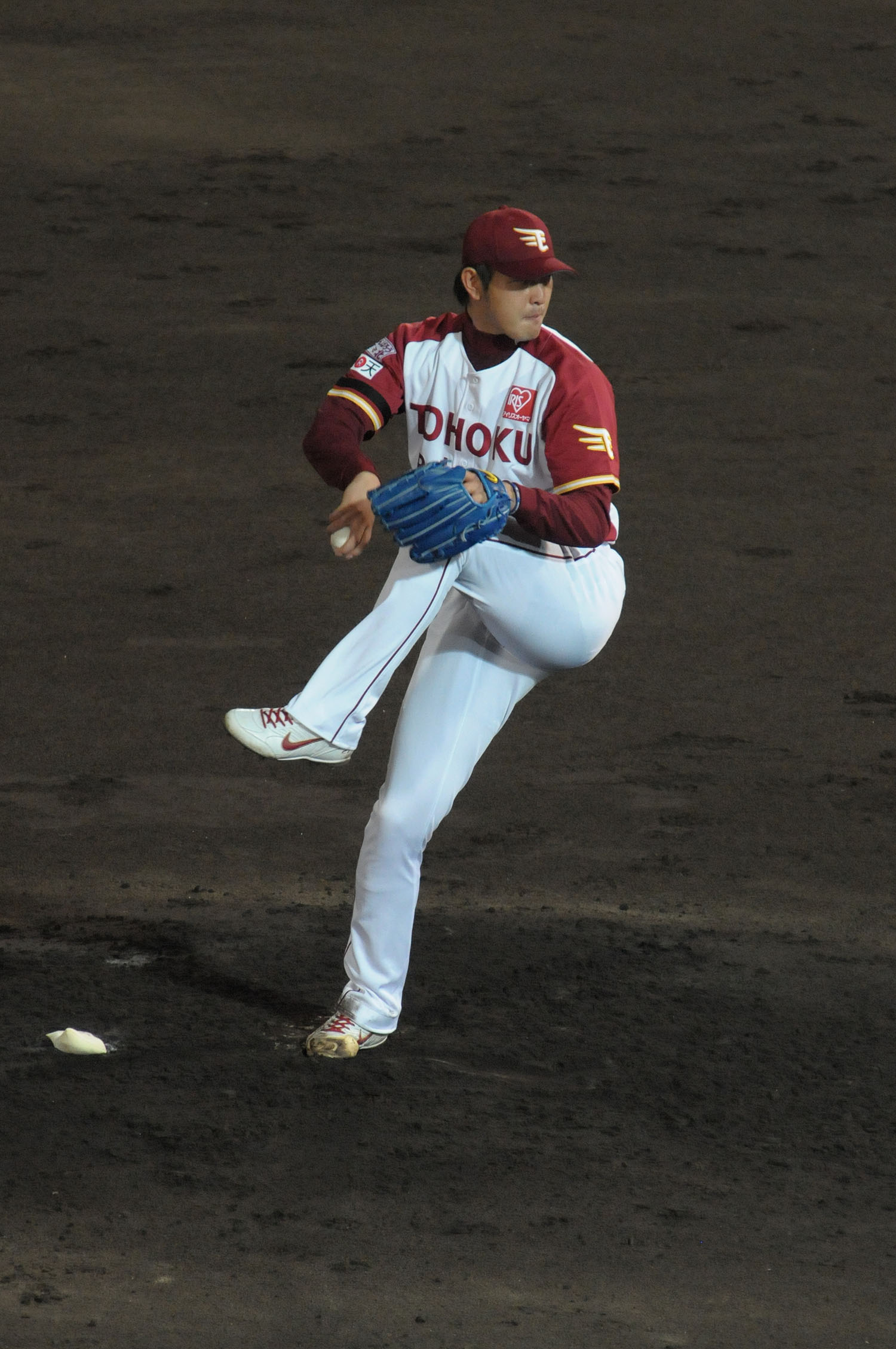
Iwakuma pitching for the Tohoku Rakuten Golden Eagles in 2011.

Iwakuma started the season opener for the Eagles for the third straight year in 2009, requiring just 59 pitches to throw six innings of one-run ball en route to the win on April 3 in a much-hyped match-up with World Baseball Classic teammate and 22-year-old Fighters right-hander Yu Darvish (who threw 121 pitches in a complete game loss, all three runs given up in the first inning). He recorded his first complete game of the year on May 16 against the Hawks.

On October 4, 2010, the Golden Eagles granted permission for Iwakuma to pursue a career in Major League Baseball (MLB) via the posting system. The Oakland Athletics won the bidding. However, Iwakuma and the Athletics could not come to terms on a contract in the 30-day negotiating period.

=== Seattle Mariners ===
Iwakuma signed with the Seattle Mariners prior to the 2012 MLB season, for $1.5 million guaranteed, plus an additional $3.4 million in incentives linked to starts, innings pitched, and awards. He was part of the Mariners' bullpen to start the season and did not pitch until the club's fifteenth game, making him the last member of any team's opening day roster (who was not injured or demoted to the minor leagues) to appear in a game. Iwakuma later became an effective member of the Mariners' pitching staff, pitching in 30 games (16 starts and 14 relief appearances), going 9–5 with two saves and a 3.16 earned run average.

On November 2, 2012, Iwakuma agreed to a two-year, $14 million extension with an option for 2015. Iwakuma earned $6.5 million in 2013 and 2014, and his option for 2015 is worth $7 million with a $1 million buyout. Iwakuma was chosen along with fellow pitcher Félix Hernández to represent the Mariners at the 2013 MLB All-Star Game. However, he did not pitch, as he had played on the Sunday before the game. On September 18, Iwakuma pitched eight scoreless innings against the Detroit Tigers striking out Miguel Cabrera twice, making him 0-for-4 and lowering his batting average to .347. Iwakuma gave up no runs and four hits getting out of two bases loaded jams in the first and fourth.

Iwakuma finished third in the 2013 American League Cy Young Award voting, behind winner Max Scherzer and runner up Yu Darvish. He finished the year third in the league in ERA, third in innings pitched, second in WHIP and first in WAR. His 2013 season year finished 14–6 with a 2.66 ERA and a 1.00 WHIP.

Iwakuma sustained a strained tendon in his finger in February 2014 and was expected to miss 4–6 weeks. On May 3, Iwakuma returned from the DL to play against the Houston Astros. Making 28 starts in 2014, Iwakuma finished 15–9 with a 3.52 ERA.

On April 21, 2015, Iwakuma was placed on the DL with a strained lat muscle. He was activated by Seattle on July 6.

On August 12, 2015, at Safeco Field against the Baltimore Orioles, Iwakuma threw the fifth no-hitter in Mariners history. It was also his first MLB complete game. For his effort, Iwakuma won the American League Player of the Week Award. Making 20 starts in 2015, Iwakuma finished with a 9–5 record and a 3.54 ERA.

On December 17, 2015, Iwakuma re-signed with the Mariners on a 1-year contract, with vesting options for 2017 and 2018. Iwakuma had previously attempted to sign a three-year, $45 million deal with the Los Angeles Dodgers, but the deal was declined because the Dodgers had some concerns about the results of his physical.

On May 10, 2017, Iwakuma was placed on the 10-day disabled list due to right shoulder inflammation. He was later moved to the 60-day disabled list. He started six games for the Mariners in 2017, going 0–2 with a 4.35 ERA in his final MLB season. On November 2, 2017, the Mariners declined their option making him a free agent. He signed a minor league contract with an invitation to spring training with the Mariners on November 27. On September 11, 2018, he announced that he would return to Japan to play baseball after spending the 2018 season in the minors.

=== Yomiuri Giants ===
On December 19, 2018, Iwakuma signed with Yomiuri Giants of Nippon Professional Baseball (NPB). He pitched two innings for their Eastern League team in 2019, not reaching NPB.

On October 19, 2020, Iwakuma announced his retirement after the season.

== International career ==
=== 2004 Athens Olympics ===
Iwakuma made his first appearance on the international stage when he was named to the Japan national team that would play in the 2004 Athens Olympics. Coming off a torrid 12–0 start to the regular season, Iwakuma took the mound in the second game of the preliminary round against the Netherlands on August 16. However, he allowed seven baserunners (three hits, three walks, and a hit-batter) and gave up three runs (two earned) against a team that was viewed as the heavy underdog, leading head coach (and acting manager) Kiyoshi Nakahata to pull him from the game after just 1 2/3 innings. Though Japan went on to win the game 8–3 behind a strong relief effort (five shutout innings) by future MLB pitcher Hiroki Kuroda, Iwakuma lost the trust of the coaching staff and did not pitch in the tournament again.

=== 2009 World Baseball Classic ===
Chosen to play in the 2009 World Baseball Classic as a member of the national team, Iwakuma made his first appearance of the tournament in the final game of the first round against South Korea on March 9, holding them just one run over 5 1/3 innings but receiving no run support and being charged with the loss. He pitched six shutout innings in his second start against Cuba in the second round on March 18, earning his first win of the tournament. His stellar effort convinced manager Tatsunori Hara to choose him over Darvish, who had been unofficially tabbed as the staff ace prior to the tournament, as the starter for Japan in the championship game against South Korea. Iwakuma did not disappoint, limiting the team to just two runs over 7 2/3 innings. While Darvish gave up the tying run in the ninth after coming on in relief, Iwakuma played an instrumental role in Japan's eventual win and second consecutive title. Boston Red Sox right-hander Daisuke Matsuzaka earned MVP honors for the tournament, largely on merit of his perfect 3–0 record, but Iwakuma finished the tournament with the lowest ERA (1.35) of any pitcher that threw 15 or more innings and was one of three pitchers named to the All-Tournament team.

== Pitching style ==
=== Mechanics ===
Iwakuma is a 6-foot-3-inch (1.91 m), 210-pound (95 kg), right-hander pitcher with a three-quarters delivery. He was well known for his unique pitching motion during his years with the Buffaloes, letting his throwing arm hang at his side while he raised his left leg, lowered it halfway once, then raised it again before driving towards the plate. He was forced to overhaul his mechanics and implement a more orthodox delivery when the NPB changed its rules on pitching motions in the 2005 off-season, taking a stricter stance on so-called two-stage motions (those with pauses or breaks at any point in the delivery). In 2008, Iwakuma also raised his arm slot slightly to induce more movement in his offspeed pitches.

=== Repertoire ===
Iwakuma's four-seam fastball was clocked at speeds as high as 153 km/h (95 mph) earlier in his NPB career. Since hurting his shoulder, it has usually sat in 88–92 mph (tops out at 94 mph). He complemented it with an above-average splitter (84–87 mph), a slider (80–82 mph), an occasional curveball (71–73 mph), and a shuuto (two-seamer/sinker, 87–91 mph), often using the splitter as his out pitch. He recorded a moderate number of strikeouts each season but was generally a groundball pitcher, adept at jamming opposing hitters with his wide assortment of offspeed pitches and excellent command, with a career 2.00 walks per nine innings rate in NPB and 1.9 rate in MLB. Iwakuma's command improved after missing much of the 2006 and 2007 seasons due to injury and changing his pitching mechanics.

== Coaching career ==
On January 12, 2021, Iwakuma was hired by the Seattle Mariners, his former team, as a special assignment coach.

== Personal life ==
Iwakuma's wife and two children moved with him from Japan to Seattle at the start of his MLB career. Iwakuma's wife is the daughter of Koju Hirohashi, former coach of the Seibu Lions. Iwakuma practices Nichiren Buddhism and is a member of the Soka Gakkai International Buddhist association. He and his wife support various children's charities including orphanages and organizations that provide assistance to children with disabilities.

Achievements
Preceded by Cole Hamels	No-hitter pitcher August 12, 2015	Succeeded by Mike Fiers
