= List of Seattle Mariners no-hitters =

The Seattle Mariners are a Major League Baseball franchise based in Seattle, Washington. Formed in 1977, they play in the American League West division. Pitchers for the Mariners have thrown six no-hitters in franchise history. A no-hitter is officially recognized by Major League Baseball only when a pitcher (or pitchers) "allows no hits during the entire course of a game, which consists of at least nine innings." The first perfect game in Mariners' history (a special subcategory of no-hitter in which "no batter reaches any base during the course of the game") was thrown on August 15, 2012 by Félix Hernández, who beat the Tampa Bay Rays in a 1–0 victory with 12 strikeouts. The Félix Hernández perfect game and Hisashi Iwakuma no hitter both took place as Wednesday matinee games that were "Mariners Camp Day" where the team hosted local summer camps. Of the six no-hitters, two were achieved in the Kingdome, three at Safeco Field—now known as T-Mobile Park—and one on the road, at Toronto's Rogers Centre.

== List of no-hitters in Mariners history ==
¶	Indicates a perfect game
£	Pitcher was left-handed
*	Member of the National Baseball Hall of Fame and Museum

#	Date	Pitcher(s)	Final score	Base- runners	Opponent	Catcher	Plate umpire	Manager	Notes	Ref
1	June 2, 1990	Randy Johnson^{£}^{*}	2–0	6	Detroit Tigers	Scott Bradley	Al Clark	Jim Lefebvre	First no-hitter in franchise history; First Mariners no-hitter at home; First left-handed pitcher to throw a no-hitter in franchise history; Johnson would pitch his perfect game almost 14 years later with the Diamondbacks	
2	April 22, 1993	Chris Bosio	7–0	2	Boston Red Sox	Dave Valle	Vic Voltaggio	Lou Piniella	First right-handed pitcher to throw a no-hitter in franchise history; Largest margin of victory in a Mariners no-hitter	
3	June 8, 2012	Kevin Millwood (6 IP); Charlie Furbush^{£} (2/3 IP); Stephen Pryor (1/3 IP); Lucas Luetge^{£} (1/3 IP); Brandon League (2/3 IP); Tom Wilhelmsen (1 IP)	1–0	4	Los Angeles Dodgers	Jesús Montero	Brian Runge	Eric Wedge	First combined no-hitter in franchise history; First interleague no-hitter in franchise history; American League record for most pitchers in a no-hitter; Millwood left with an injury before beginning the seventh inning; Most pitchers to throw a combined no-hitter in MLB history (tied with Houston Astros); Longest interval between no-hitters in franchise history; Smallest margin of victory in a Mariners no-hitter (tie); First Mariners no-hitter thrown at T-Mobile Park (then called Safeco Field)	
4	August 15, 2012	Felix Hernandez^{¶}	1–0	0	Tampa Bay Rays	John Jaso	Rob Drake	Eric Wedge	First perfect game in franchise history; Smallest margin of victory in a Mariners no-hitter (tie)	
5	August 12, 2015	Hisashi Iwakuma	3–0	3	Baltimore Orioles	Jesús Sucre	Jeff Nelson	Lloyd McClendon	First career complete game shutout by Hisashi Iwakuma; First complete game by Iwakuma in MLB; First no-hitter by a Japanese-born pitcher since Hideo Nomo on April 4, 2001; Second Japanese pitcher to throw a Major League no-hitter, after Hideo Nomo	
6	May 8, 2018	James Paxton^{£}	5–0	3	@ Toronto Blue Jays	Mike Zunino	James Hoye	Scott Servais	First road no-hitter in Mariners history; Second no-hitter by a Canadian-born pitcher after Dick Fowler on September 9, 1945; First Canadian pitcher to throw a no-hitter in his home country	

== See also ==
- List of Major League Baseball no-hitters
