= Bloomington, New York =

- Hamlet
- The historic Mountain Lake Manor hotel in 1976.

- Location within New York Location within the United States
- Coordinates: 41°52′44″N 74°02′39″W
- Country: United States
- State: New York
- County: Ulster
- Elevation: 184 ft (56 m)
- Time zone: UTC-5 (Eastern (EST))
  - Summer (DST): UTC-4 (EDT)
- ZIP code: 12411
- Area code: 845
- GNIS feature ID: 944292

Bloomington is a hamlet in the Town of Rosendale, Ulster County, New York, United States. The community is located along New York State Route 32, 4.1 miles (6.6 km) south-southwest of Kingston. Bloomington has a post office with ZIP code 12411, which opened on July 20, 1897.
