= David Gonzalez (storyteller) =

American artist (born 1956)

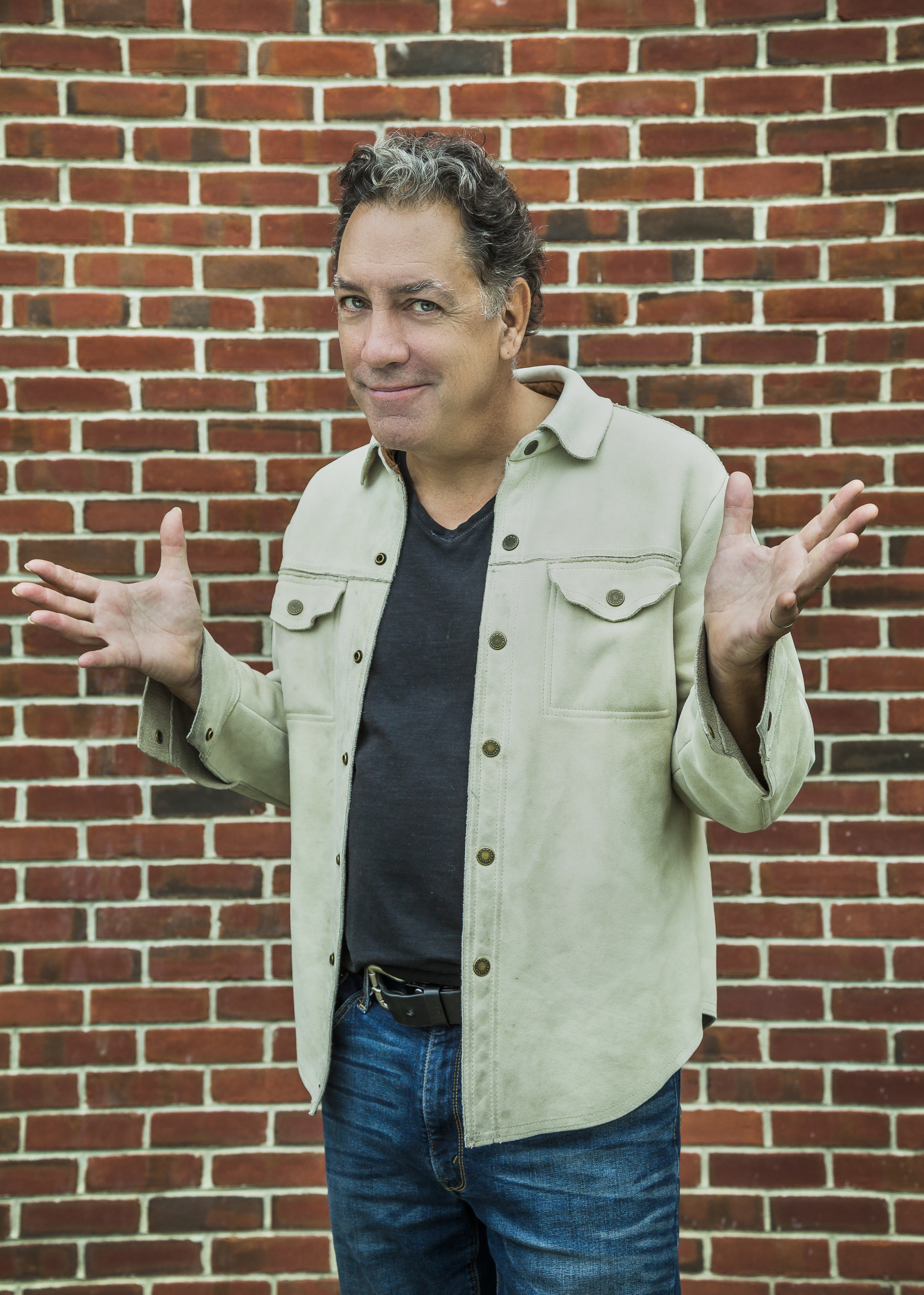
- Born: 1956 (age 69–70); New York
- Education: New York University
- Awards: Helen Hayes Performing Artist of the Year (1999), Fellow of the Joseph Campbell Foundation (2010), International Performing Arts for Youth "Lifetime Achievement Award for Sustained Excellence" (2011)
- Website: http://www.davidgonzalez.com/

David Gonzalez (born 1956, New York) is an American artist. He has developed a career as a storyteller, poet, playwright, musician, public speaker, actor, and producer. His creative work has been included in several anthologies and albums and his productions have been performed in major theaters in the U.S. and abroad.

== Early life and education ==
Gonzalez was born in the Bronx. His father was Cuban and his mother Puerto Rican. He spent his early childhood in Cuba and returned to the Bronx when he was three. His love of storytelling began at the age of seven, when his uncle gave him a set of puppets and his mother made a curtain for their performance.

His high school English teacher, Tom Porton, introduced him to theater, music and ballet. After graduating New York University with a Bachelor of Arts degree, he trained as a professional guitarist in Spain, then returned to New York University, where he earned his undergraduate and master's degrees and a doctorate in music therapy. He also studied dance for five years at Djoniba Dance and Drum Center with Abdullah Djoniba Mouflet.

Joseph Campbell, a professor of comparative mythology and comparative religion, introduced him to myth and legend and mentored him in his music therapy work. He subsequently incorporated myths into his creative work, as well as his work with children and adults with disabilities.

== Career ==
=== Music therapy, social services ===
Gonzalez worked as a Certified Music Therapist with special needs populations at social service centers in New York City, while pursuing his work as a poet, musician and storyteller. He was director of music therapy at Long Island University from 1985 - 1986 and an adjunct professor at New York University from 1984 - 1998.

=== Presentations and performances ===
As a musician he is a guitarist, pianist and composer. He has written, composed, performed and choreographed most of his shows. Over his career, he has offered presentations in theaters, educational institutions, civic and cultural centers, and conferences.

He broke into storytelling (1983) with Aesop's fables that he called Animals, Animals, Animals, and continued with other folktale shows: Up in Smoke, Totally Awesome, Cuentos: Tales from the LatinX World, and The Handless Maiden.

Sofrito! was a mix of folk tales set to salsa, mambo and jazz rhythms in collaboration with Larry Harlow and The Latin Legends Band. It was commissioned by the New Victory Theater in 1998.

In Mytholojazz (1999) he played the role of Orpheus with the DD Jackson Trio with an original score by D.D. Jackson. In it he fused Greek and South African myths with D.D. Jackson's jazz style.

In City of Dreams (2004) he shared the stage with a Latin jazz quartet, mixing his poetry with ancient Afro-Cuban rhythms, mambo-flavored house grooves, funk, metal-edged rock, and modern jazz.

The Frog Bride (2006)was based on an old Russian fairy tale with music by Prokofiev and images by Kandinsky. At New Victory Theater, David Gonzalez was directed by Lenard Petit, accompanied by jazz violinist Christian Howes and jazz composer and keyboardist Daniel Kelly.

In The Man of the House (2013) Gonzalez looks at divorce and estrangement from the perspective of children, depicting the semi-autobiographical tale of finding his absent father during his teenage years. A large part of its audience is found among young people who have already left their childhood and are not yet adults. It was commissioned and presented by the Kennedy Center .

In 2021, Gonzalez premiered Gonzo’s Multiverse - a virtual variety show with a mix of digital and live-action storytelling, interviews with artists and explorations of miniature wonders of the natural world.

Hard Dinero premiered in fall of 2022, was a fully bilingual production, it utilized monologues, music, video, poetry, and sound design to deliver narratives about immigrants based on their true stories.

=== Collaborations ===
David Gonzalez wrote the lyrics, co-composed the music and starred in a collaboration with Yomo Toro, and Larry Harlow, on the stage play and recording of Sofrito!; he wrote the book for ”Jessye Norman’s Portrait of a Legend: Sissieretta Jones” in collaboration with Jessye Norman, Darryll McDaniels (DMC), and Damien Sneed; he produced events with Jimmy Santiago Baca, on Crisalida, a community arts project of the McCallum Theatre; he composed music for, and accompanied Oliver Lake, on City of Dreams; he wrote the book and performed in MytholoJazz with D.D. Jackson; he wrote, and directed Falcon Ridge in collaboration with bluesman Guy Davis, and many others; and with producing partners such as Mass MoCA (The Frog Bride),The Kennedy Center (Man of the House), Lincoln Center (As if the Past Was Listening), The Royal National Theatre (Mytholojazz), and others.

The New York artist has received grants from The National Endowment for the Arts for Finding North, The National Endowment For The Humanities/National Writing Project for Falcon Ridge, The New York Council on the Arts for Hard Dinero, The Jerome Irving Foundation for Crisalida, Artists Planet Earth for Wounded Splendor, The Burroughs-Wellcome Fund for A Spork In The Road, and others.

He has received commissions from, The Kennedy Center for the Performing Arts and The State University of New York at Purchase (The man of the house); The Cincinnati Opera (Rise for freedom); The Smithsonian Institution (Double Crossed: The Saga Of The Saint Louis); The Cincinnati Playhouse in the Park (Finding North); The McCallum Theater (The boy who could sing pictures); Brooklyn College (Sleeping beauty), The Rosendale Theater (Hard Dinero); The Ulster County Historical Society (Falcon Ridge), and more.

He was co-host along with Florence Barrau, of ''New York Kids" between 1992 and 2000 on WNYC/New York Public Radio. The program lasted two hours, along with rotating pairs of hosts from a different school each week. A number of New York Kids episodes are archived in the Paley Center for Media.

His poems and stories explore cultural identity and steps towards transcendence.

David Gonzalez composed and performed the music for the poems of the Spanish poet José María Márquez Jurado "Gopala": "No para mi alma de reír", "Despacio" and "Contemplar la luna".

== Awards and recognition ==
- Pushcart Prize Nomination 2022.
- Joseph Campbell Foundation Fellow - 2010
- Drama Desk Nomination - 2006
- Helen Hayes Performing Artist of the Year – 1999
- International Performing Arts for Youth "Lifetime Achievement Award for Sustained Excellence" (2011)

== Publications ==
=== Academic ===
- Mythopoetic Music Therapy (Doctoral Dissertation) 1992.
- "Like singing with a bird: Improvisational music therapy with a blind four-year-old girl." Case Studies in Music Therapy, 1990.
- Mythopoetic music therapy: A phenomenological investigation into its application with adults, 1992.
- Listening with a larger ear: Three case studies. Ear Magazine, Sept. 1984.

=== Poetry ===
- Soundings, The Poetry Box, 2022

=== Children's books ===
- Tito and the Bridge Brigade, 2020.
- Tio Jose and the Singing Trees, 2020.
