= Rosendale, New York =

- Town
- Location in Ulster County and the state of New York.
- Coordinates: 41°50′49″N 74°4′34″W
- Country: United States
- State: New York
- County: Ulster

Area
  - Total: 20.75 sq mi (53.73 km^{2})
  - Land: 19.98 sq mi (51.74 km^{2})
  - Water: 0.77 sq mi (1.99 km^{2})
- Elevation: 56 ft (17 m)

Population (2020)
  - Total: 5,782
  - Estimate (2016): 5,903
  - Density: 289.4/sq mi (111.8/km^{2})
- Time zone: UTC-5 (Eastern (EST))
  - Summer (DST): UTC-4 (EDT)
- ZIP code: 12472
- Area code: 845
- FIPS code: 36-63737
- GNIS feature ID: 0979435
- Website: Town website

Rosendale is a town in the center of Ulster County, New York, United States. It once contained a village Rosendale, primarily centered around Main Street, but which was dissolved through vote in 1977. The population was 5,782 at the 2020 census.

== History ==
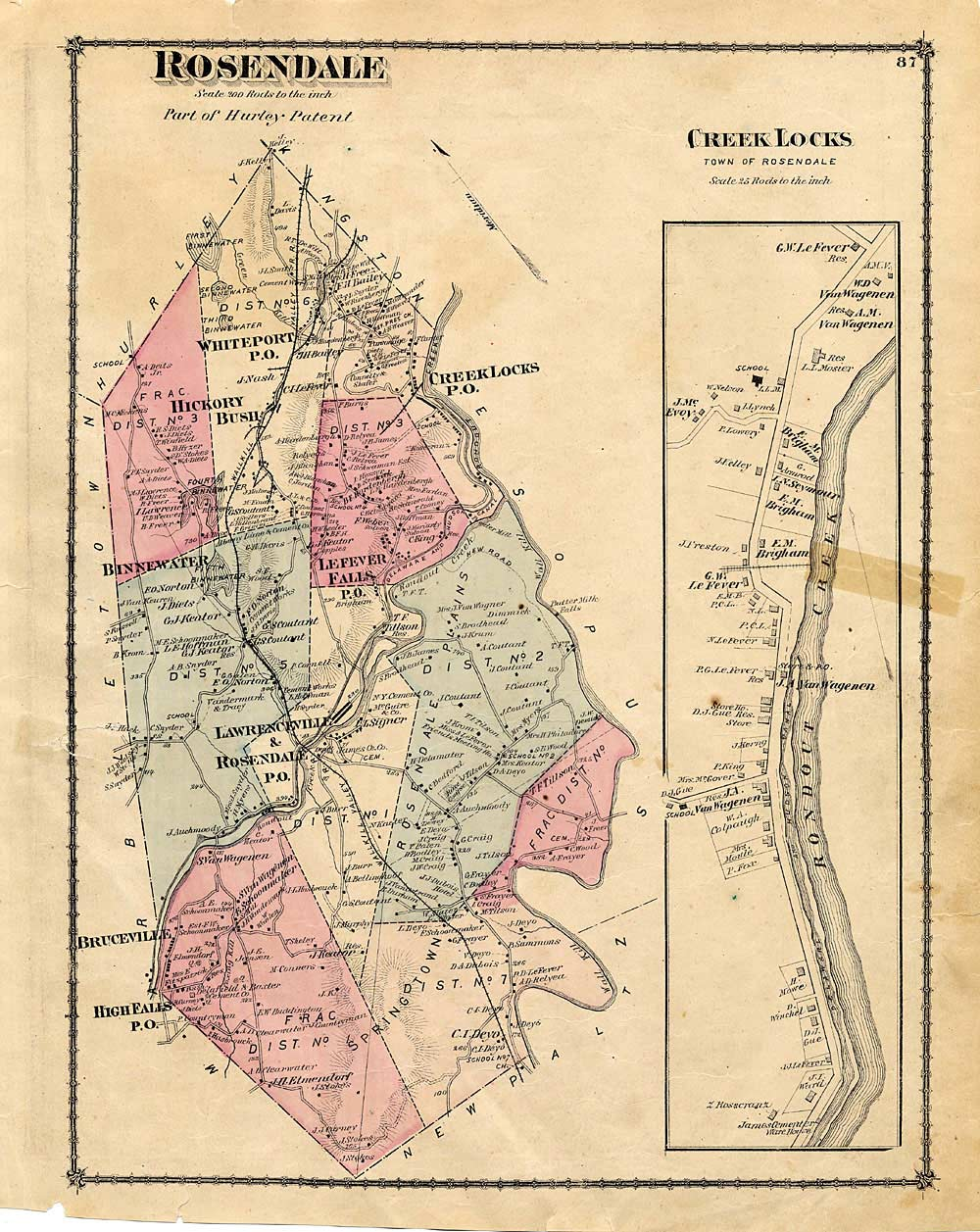
Rosendale in 1875

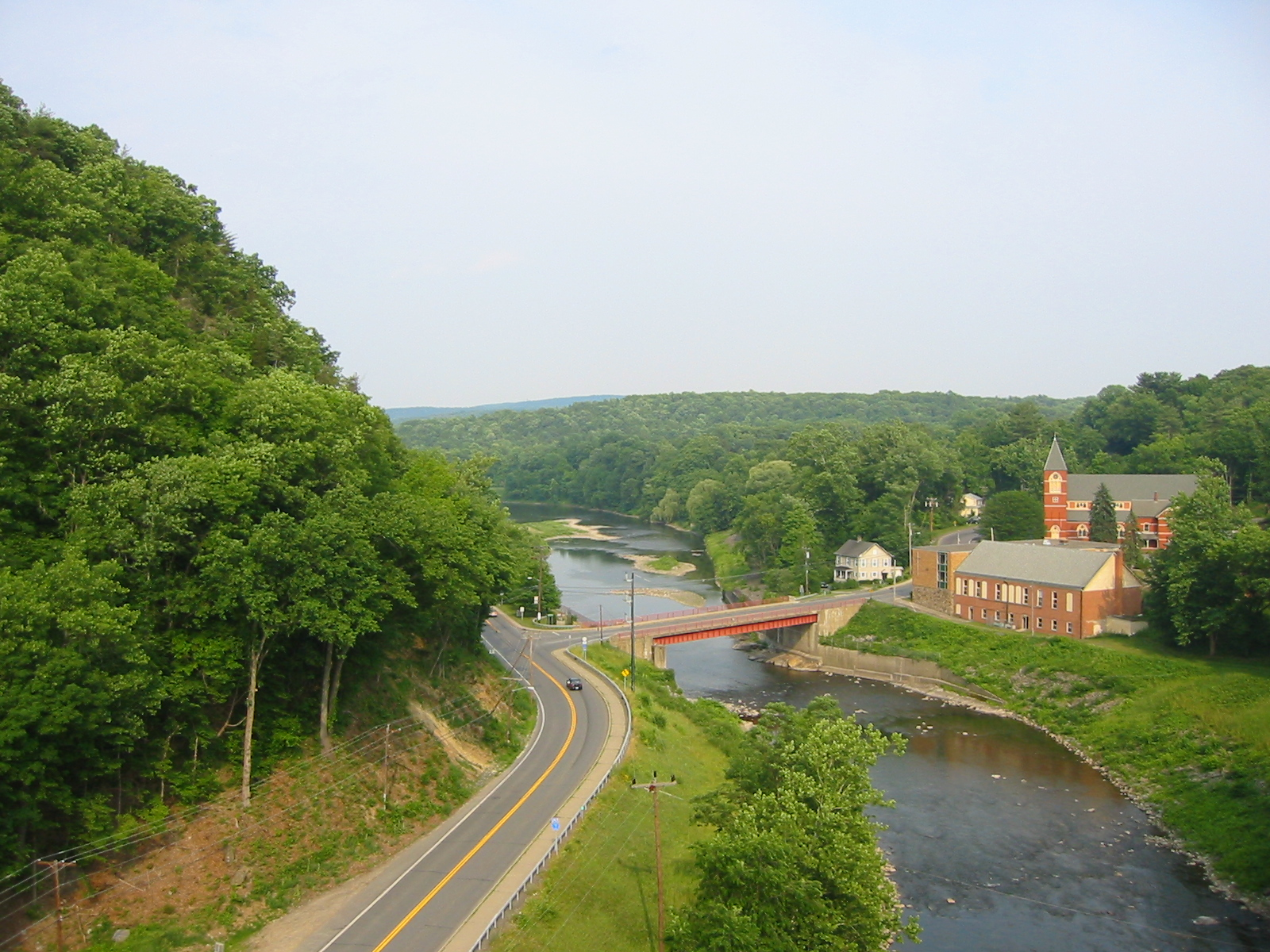
Joppenbergh Mountain (left), Route 213 (center) and the Rondout Creek (right), viewed from the Rosendale trestle overlooking the town

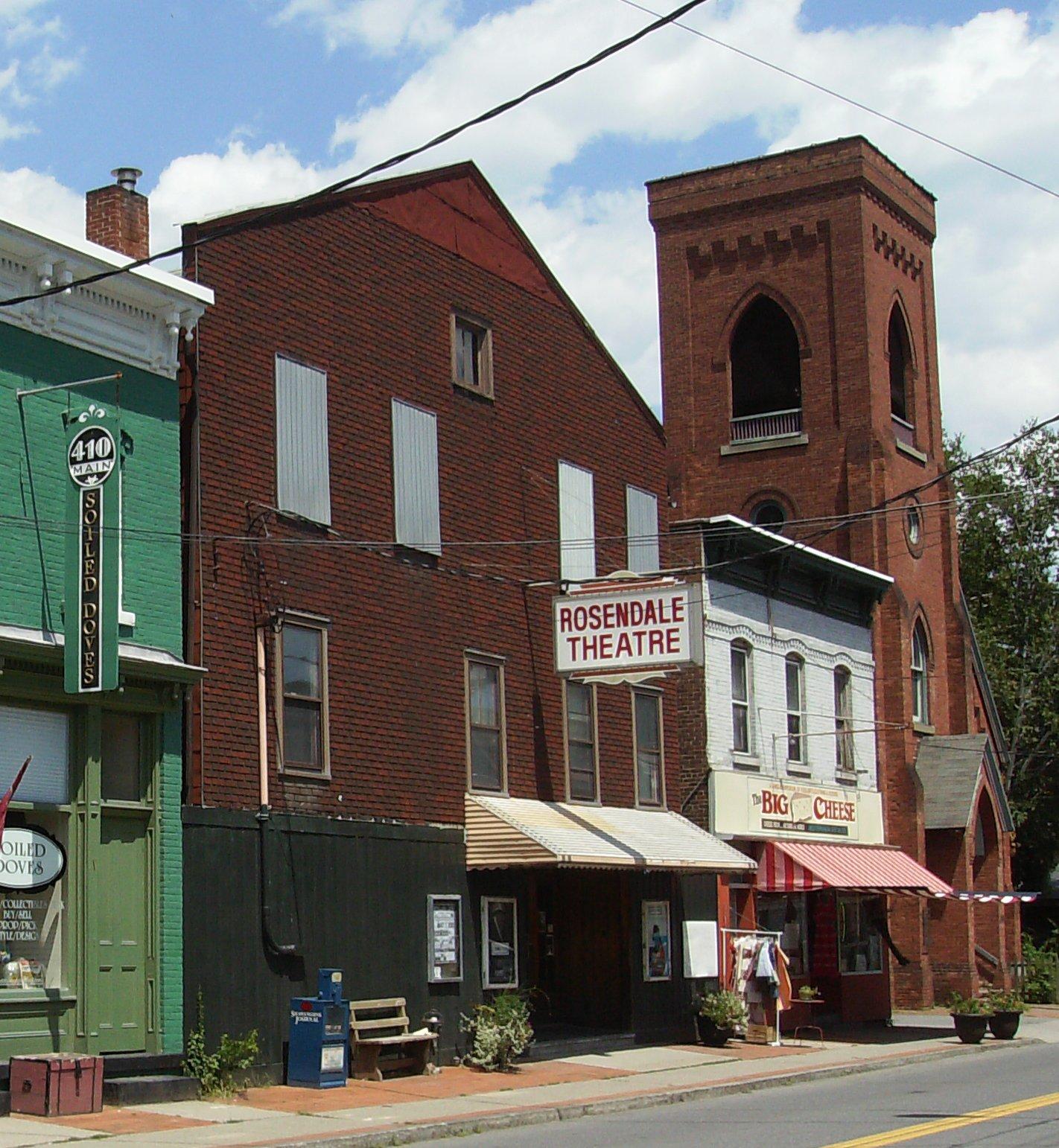
The Rosendale Theatre, a single-screen movie theater on Main Street

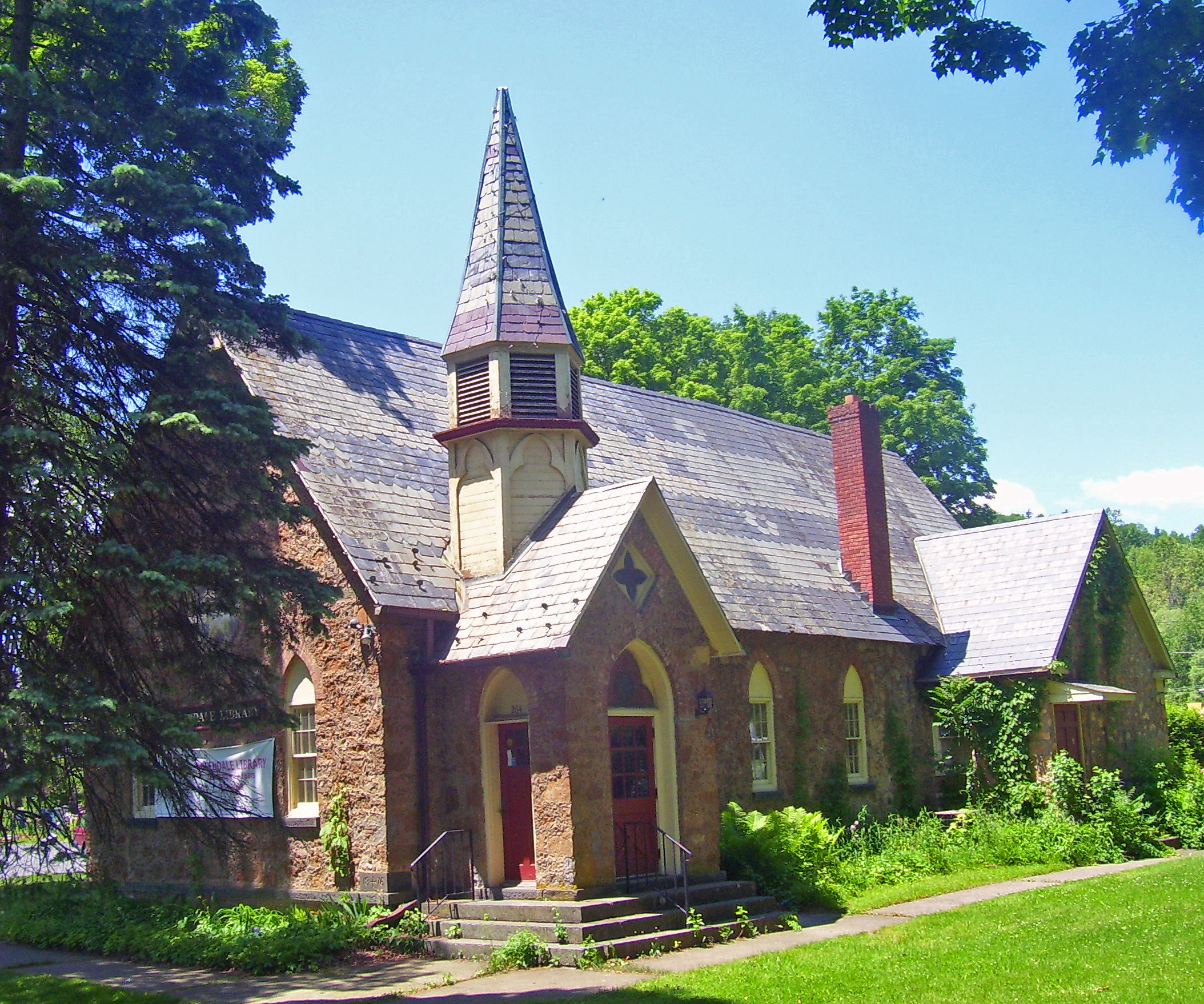
The Rosendale Library, in the now-unincorporated Rosendale Village

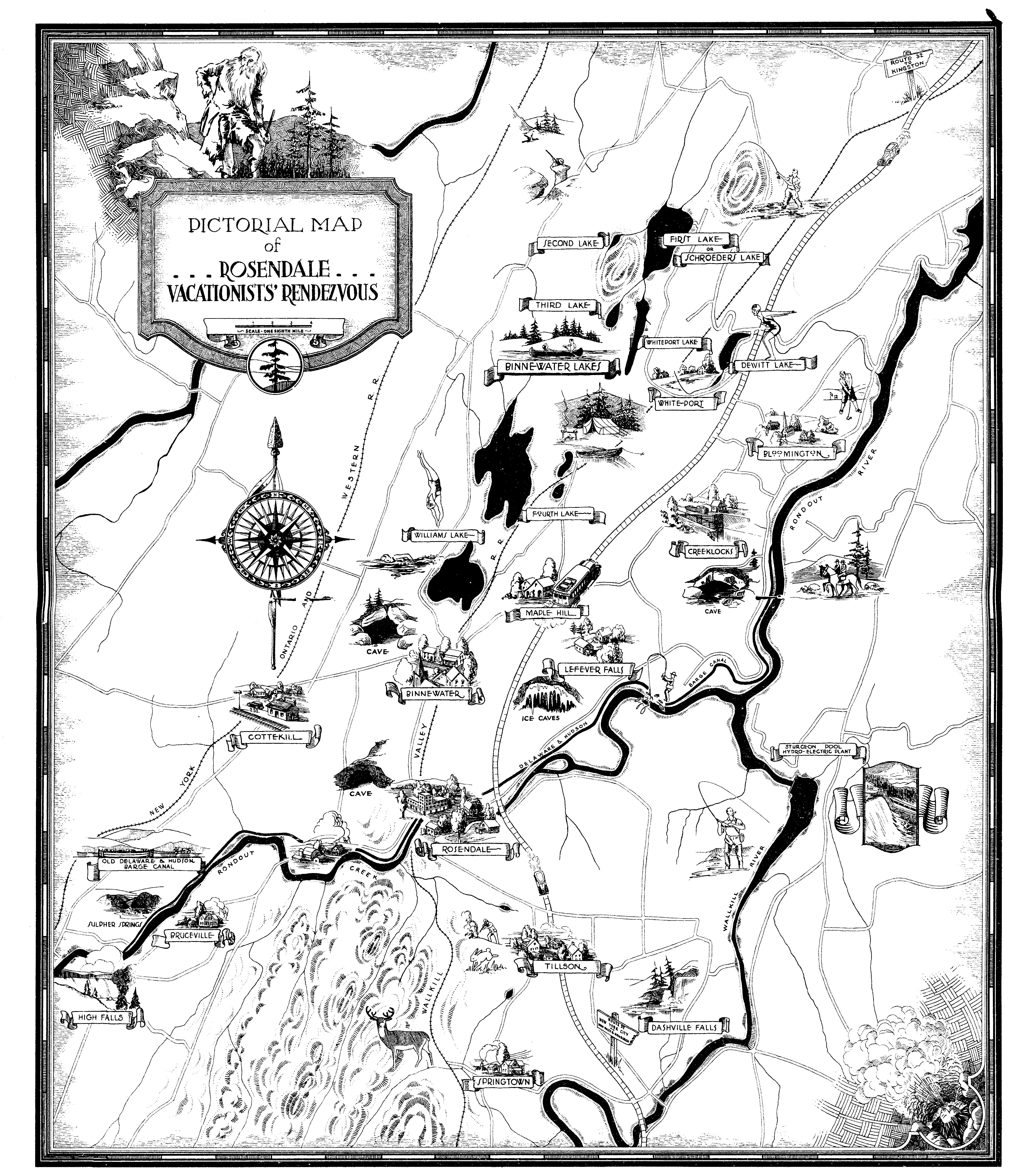
Rosendale in 1938

At the time of the European settlement, the region was inhabited by the Lenapes, who were a member of the Algonquian peoples. The area which was eventually known as Rosendale is generally attributed to having been founded by Jacob Rutsen in 1680 from 600 acres purchased from the Lenapes straddling the Rondout Creek. Initially, the land was leased but Rutsen expanded his holdings and built a homestead, in which he resided from 1700 until his death in 1730. The Town of Rosendale was formed in 1844 from parts of the Towns of Hurley, Marbletown, and New Paltz.

Hamilton Child of Syracuse, New York published a "Gazetteer and Business Directory of Ulster County, N. Y." in 1872 that described the town. (Note: Works related to Gazetteer and Business Directory of Ulster County, N. Y./1871-1872/Rosendale at Wikisource)

== St. Peter's Roman Catholic Church ==
In the mid 1800s priests from St. Peter's in Poughkeepsie served missions in Saugerties and Rondout. In 1840 Rev. John N. Smith, pastor in Poughkeepsie, extended his care to Rosendale. In 1842, his successor, Rev. Myles Maxwell celebrated Mass in Petrie's cooper shop. That same year Maxwell was named the first resident pastor of St. Mary's in Rondout, and Rosendale became a mission served out of Rondout.

St. Peter's Roman Catholic Church was organized by Father Thomas Martin O.P., pastor of St. Mary's in Rondout. Services were held in the home of Walter Delmar. In August 1850 the first Mass was celebrated in the new church. St. Peter's remained a mission of St. Mary's until 1855 when Rev. Edward Lynch, assistant at St. Mary's, was named pastor of the new parish of St. Peter's, Rosendale. In 1874 Rev. Martin O'Flaherty became pastor. Given the ever-increasing Catholic population, attracted by the opportunity of employment in the cement quarries, plus the Delaware & Hudson Canal, a new, larger church building, designed by Arthur Crooks, was built. The first Mass in the new church was celebrated on Christmas Day 1876.

In 1881 pastor John J. Gleason built a parish school and convent. The school was staffed by the Sister of Charity. Upon Gleason's death in 1894, he left a bequest of $500 to Kingston hospital. A mission was established in Whiteport. In 1897, Rev. P. Maughan, a Civil War veteran, became pastor and built the parish hall.

== Rosendale cement ==
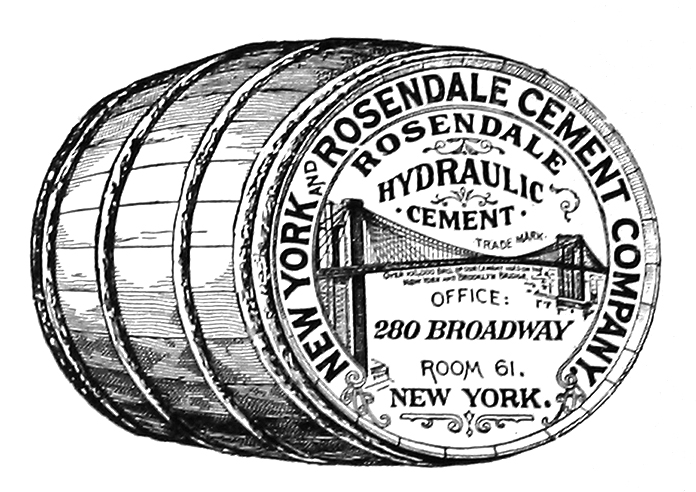
Seal of the New York and Rosendale Cement Company

The Rosendale region is most well known for the production of natural cement. The Rosendale natural cement industry began during the construction of the Delaware and Hudson Canal in 1825. The Delaware and Hudson Canal was later finished in 1828 using the world class cement. Rosendale natural cement soon gained a reputation for quality among engineers and was used in the construction of many of the United States' most important landmarks, including the Brooklyn Bridge, the pedestal of the Statue of Liberty, Federal Hall National Memorial, and one of the wings of the United States Capitol. The industry fell into decline in the early 1900s.

Rosendale natural cement was produced from dolomite extracted from mines in the Rosendale and Whiteport members of the Late Silurian Rondout Formation. The natural levels of magnesium and clay in the dolomite from the Rondout Formation are ideally suited for cement production and required none of the chemical additives characteristic of modern Portland cement production.

Several abandoned dolomite mines still exist in the Rosendale region. A mine on the property of the Snyder Estate, which is maintained as part of a museum preserving the history of the Rosendale natural cement industry by the Century House Historical Society, is open to the public. Other mines have been put to a number of uses, including mushroom farming and movie locations. The records storage management company Iron Mountain currently maintains at least one mine for storing anything from microfiche to data backup tapes.

In 2004 limited cement mining resumed in Rosendale, and Rosendale natural cement is again being produced. Freedom Cement LLC, in North Brookfield, Massachusetts, is producing natural cement for use in historic restoration projects.

== Geography ==
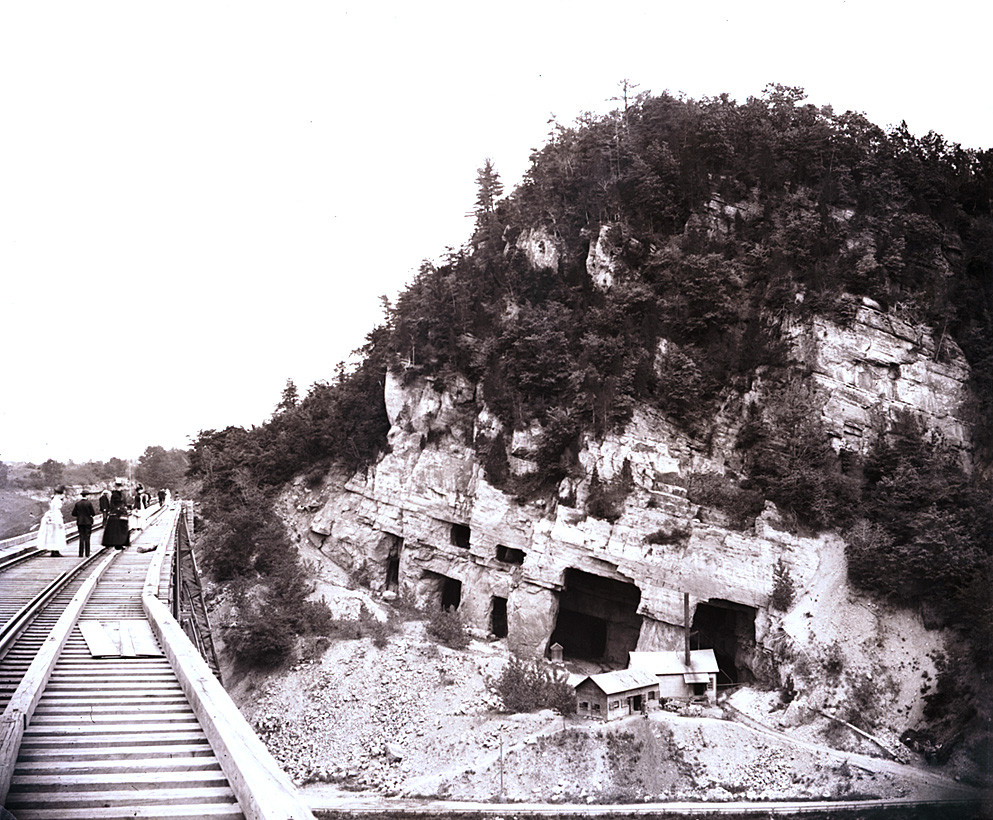
The Rosendale trestle and Joppenbergh Mountain, photographed in 1888

According to the United States Census Bureau, the town has a total area of 20.8 square miles (54 km^{2}), of which 19.9 square miles (52 km^{2}) is land and 0.8 square miles (2.1 km^{2}) (3.90%) is water.

Rosendale is bisected or bordered by natural and man-made formations. The New York State Thruway (Interstate 87) passes through the town, and the Rondout Creek joins the Wallkill River by the eastern town line.

== Demographics ==
Historical population
Census	Pop.	Note	%±
1850	2,418		—
1860	2,826		16.9%
1870	3,625		28.3%
1880	4,724		30.3%
1890	6,063		28.3%
1900	6,278		3.5%
1910	3,717		−40.8%
1920	1,959		−47.3%
1930	2,192		11.9%
1940	2,548		16.2%
1950	2,950		15.8%
1960	4,228		43.3%
1970	5,422		28.2%
1980	5,933		9.4%
1990	6,220		4.8%
2000	6,352		2.1%
2010	6,075		−4.4%
2020	5,782		−4.8%
U.S. Decennial Census

As of the census of 2000, there were 6,352 people, 2,587 households, and 1,634 families residing in the town. The population density was 318.5 inhabitants per square mile (123.0/km^{2}). There were 2,857 housing units at an average density of 143.3 per square mile (55.3/km^{2}). The racial makeup of the town was 95.72% White, 1.79% African American, 0.28% Native American, 0.44% Asian, 0.43% from other races, and 1.34% from two or more races. Hispanic or Latino of any race were 2.63% of the population.

There were 2,587 households, out of which 30.4% had children under the age of 18 living with them, 48.3% were married couples living together, 10.1% had a female householder with no husband present, and 36.8% were non-families. 28.2% of all households were made up of individuals, and 8.4% had someone living alone who was 65 years of age or older. The average household size was 2.45 and the average family size was 3.02.

In the town, the population was spread out, with 24.6% under the age of 18, 6.8% from 18 to 24, 31.9% from 25 to 44, 25.3% from 45 to 64, and 11.3% who were 65 years of age or older. The median age was 38 years. For every 100 females, there were 97.3 males. For every 100 females age 18 and over, there were 93.5 males.

The median income for a household in the town was $44,282, and the median income for a family was $51,444. Males had a median income of $34,321 versus $28,787 for females. The per capita income for the town was $21,303. About 8.4% of families and 11.9% of the population were below the poverty line, including 17.5% of those under age 18 and 9.6% of those age 65 or over.

== Communities and locations in Rosendale ==
=== Communities ===
- Binnewater – A hamlet north of Rosendale village.
- Bloomington – A hamlet in the northeastern part of the town, southeast of Whiteport.
- Bruceville – A hamlet in the southwestern section of the town, southwest of Rosendale village.
- Cottekill – A hamlet northwest of Rosendale village.
- Creeklocks – A hamlet at the eastern town line, south of Bloomington and on the west bank of Rondout Creek.
- Hickory Bush – A hamlet in the northeastern section of the town, south of Whiteport and located on the west bank of Rondout Creek.
- High Falls – A hamlet and census-designated place at the town line by the southwestern part of the town.
- High Falls Park - A hamlet centered on Mossy Brook Road.
- Kallops Corners – A hamlet north of Rosendale village.
- Lawrenceville – A hamlet west of Rosendale village on Route 213.
- Lefevere Falls – A hamlet adjacent to the Thruway and northeast of Rosendale village.
- Maple Hill – A hamlet north of Lefever Falls and Rosendale village.
- Rosendale (also known as Rosendale Village or Rosendale Hamlet) – A hamlet and census-designated place in the eastern half of the town, by Rondout Creek. It was a village until 1977.
- Tillson – A hamlet and census-designated place south of Rosendale village
- Whiteport – A hamlet in the northeastern corner of the town, adjacent to the Thruway.

=== Locations ===
- Sturgeon Pool – A wide part of the Wallkill River at the eastern town line on NY route 213.

== Government ==
The town's government is made up of a town board, consisting of a Supervisor and four council members. In addition, there is a deputy supervisor, a town clerk, two town justices, a deputy Town clerk, a Highway Superintendent and a Tax Collector.
