= Rosendale Theatre =

Theater in Rosendale, New York

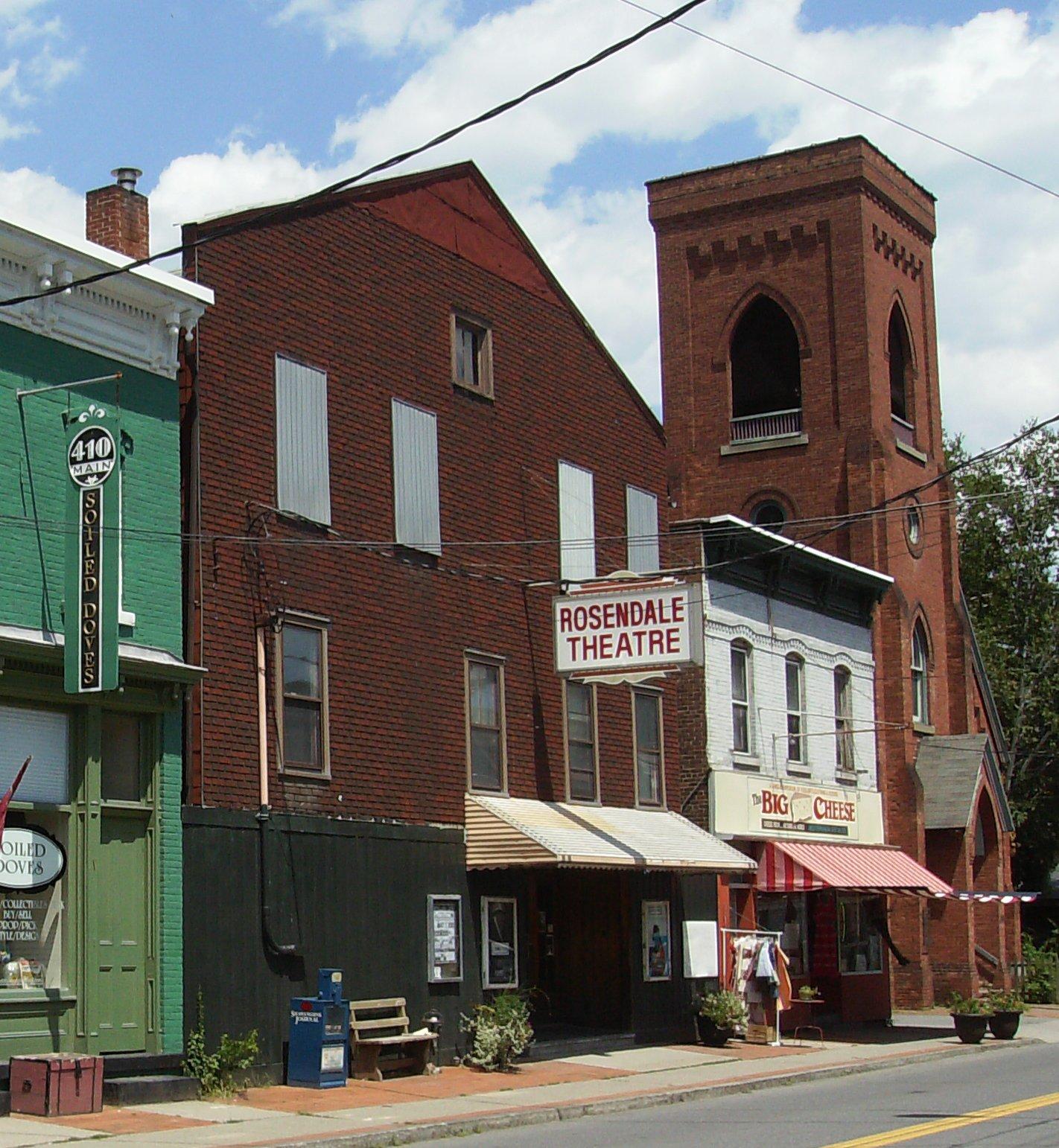
- The Theatre's front facing exterior, before its renovation by the Rosendale Theatre Collective
- Interactive map of Rosendale Theatre
- Address: 408 Main Street; Rosendale, New York; United States
- Coordinates: 41.84428°N 74.08218°W
- Owner: Rosendale Theatre Collective
- Capacity: 260

Construction
- Opened: February 18, 1949

Website
- www.rosendaletheatre.org

The Rosendale Theatre is a three-story, 260-seat movie theater and performance venue in Rosendale Village, a hamlet and former village in the town of Rosendale in Ulster County, New York. The building was opened as a casino in 1905, and began showing films in the 1920s. By the 1930s, a stage had been installed for live vaudeville and burlesque acts. The casino was eventually taken over by the local government, and used to house the town's fire department.

A tile setter, Anthony Cacchio Sr., rented the building in 1949 and converted it into a movie theater; it opened on February 18, 1949 with a screening of the film Blood on the Moon. Cacchio owned the building outright by the mid-1950s. During this time, a severe flood damaged the Theatre's interior, and all the equipment had to be replaced. In its early years, the Theatre showed about 300 different movies each year, making it unpopular with film distributors. Denied easy access to first run films, the Theatre turned to independent movies and art films, and eventually began exhibiting live performances. Cacchio's entire family helped run the Theatre; his wife Fannie sold tickets and determined the Theatre's movie selection, while their sons Anthony Jr. and Rocco, and grandson Michael, ran the projector and eventually managed the day-to-day operation of the business.

After more than 60 years of continuous operation, the Cacchio family decided to sell the Theatre. Rather than sell to real estate developers, the Cacchios preferred to transfer the property to the Rosendale Theatre Collective, a nonprofit formed in late 2009 for the sole purpose of buying and preserving the Theatre. The group spent months raising funds for a down payment on the building, with the bulk of its money coming from small individual donations. About 60 fundraisers were held, and a large grant was provided by PepsiCo after the Theatre Collective ran a successful social networking campaign for the April 2010 Pepsi Refresh Project. The Cacchios transferred ownership of the property to the Theatre Collective on August 19, 2010. Since its purchase, the Theatre has had several equipment upgrades, including a move to digital cinema and 7.1 surround sound.

== History ==
=== Construction and early use ===
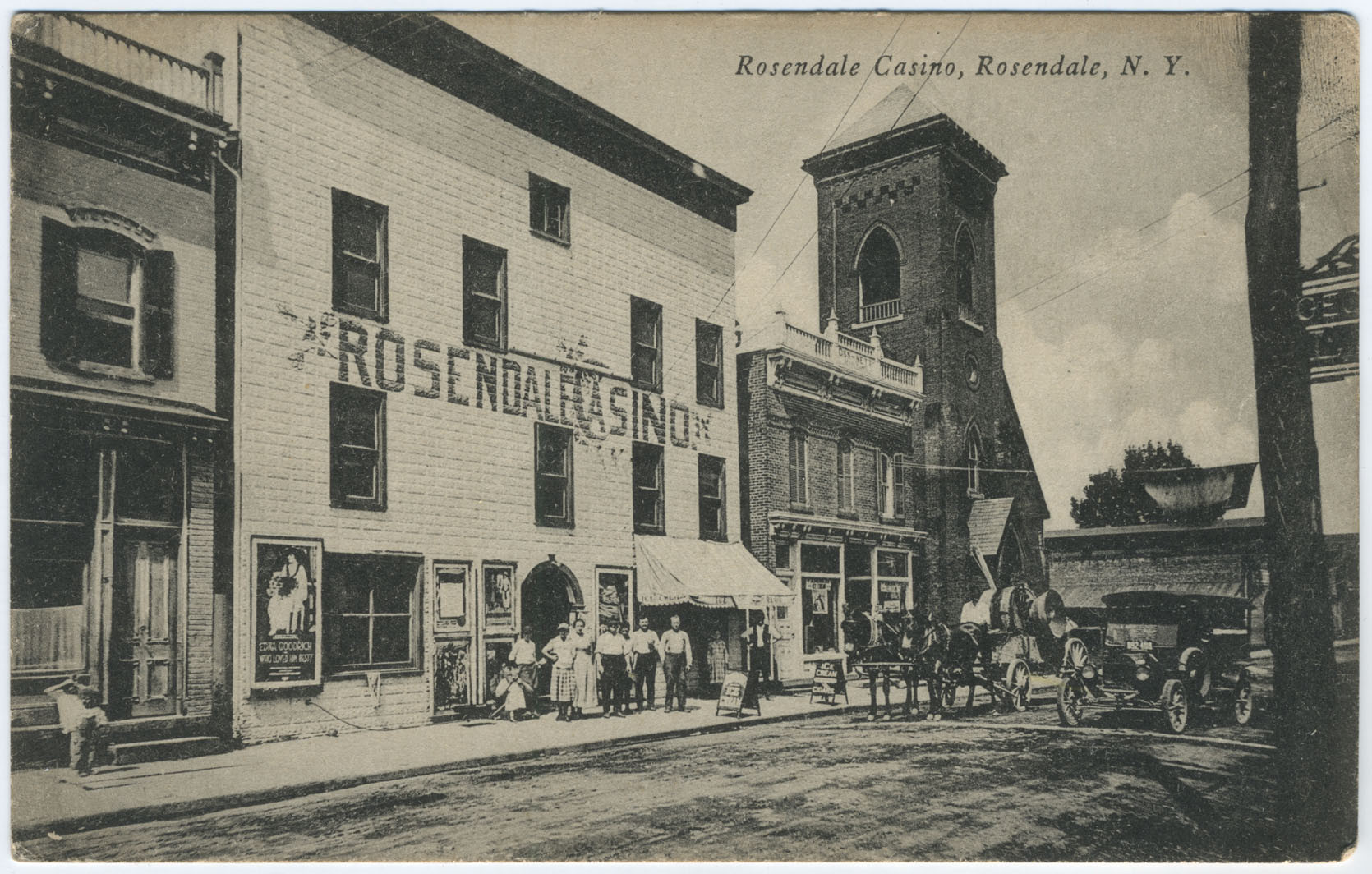
The Rosendale Casino in 1919, decades before its ownership by the Cacchios

The first building constructed on the site now occupied by the Theatre was reputedly a blacksmith shop, erected during the 19th century to service the town's cement mills and the Delaware and Hudson Canal. The current three-story structure was opened in 1905 as the Rosendale Casino. As a casino, the building doubled as a theater, screening movies in the 1920s on 16 mm film.

The following decade, the casino began exhibiting burlesque and vaudeville acts to draw crowds, and a raised stage was installed for the live performances. The building eventually became village property, and housed the town's fire house. Known as Firemen's Hall, the building was also used by the town's fire department as a basketball court. Basketball was extremely popular in Rosendale in the 1940s. On Friday nights the Firemen's Hall became a dance hall, and people would sometimes square dance in formal attire.

=== Ownership by the Cacchios ===
Anthony Cacchio Sr., a tile setter from Poughkeepsie who bore a strong resemblance to filmmaker Otto Preminger, received permission to rent the building from the village's mayor, who strongly desired a movie theater in Rosendale. Cacchio opened the former casino as a one-room, 300-seat movie theater on February 18, 1949. Critics of the venture, wary of out-of-towners, claimed it would not be profitable, and that the Theatre would be closed within six months.

Tickets were sold for 50 cents apiece for adults and 25 cents for children, and the first film shown on opening night was a western, Blood on the Moon. Cacchio's sons, Anthony "Uncle Tony" Cacchio Jr. and Rocco "Rocky" Cacchio, worked with him at the Theatre, serving as ushers on opening night, and eventually running the Theatre. Cacchio's wife, Fannie, sold tickets to moviegoers. She had never held such a job before the Theatre's opening, but continued to sell tickets and work at the Theatre for over five decades without requesting a single paycheck. The Theatre continued to house the town's fire department for some time; one Rosendale resident, Bill Brooks, later recalled walking around a fire truck to reach the bathroom.

The Cacchio family owned the building outright by 1954, and in 1955 the Rondout Creek flooded, filling the Theatre with 3 feet (0.91 m) of water and destroying its contents. The Cacchios took out loans and received relief funds from the government to rebuild. A new 35 mm projector and sound equipment were installed, along with "pull-handle vending machines". A popcorn machine was added, but broke down in 1965 and was not replaced. While most movie theaters at the time generated profit by selling concessions, Anthony Cacchio Jr. made the "daring move" of banning popcorn in the Theatre in 1964 because it was "too smelly, messy on the seats, and crackling paper bags disrupted quiet scenes".

Anthony Cacchio Jr. was trained to operate the Theatre's equipment by one of his employees, a union projectionist who left in 1966 to work at a different theater in Kingston. By 1980, the cost of tickets was half that of competing, larger theaters, and annual attendance was between 40,000 and 50,000 people.

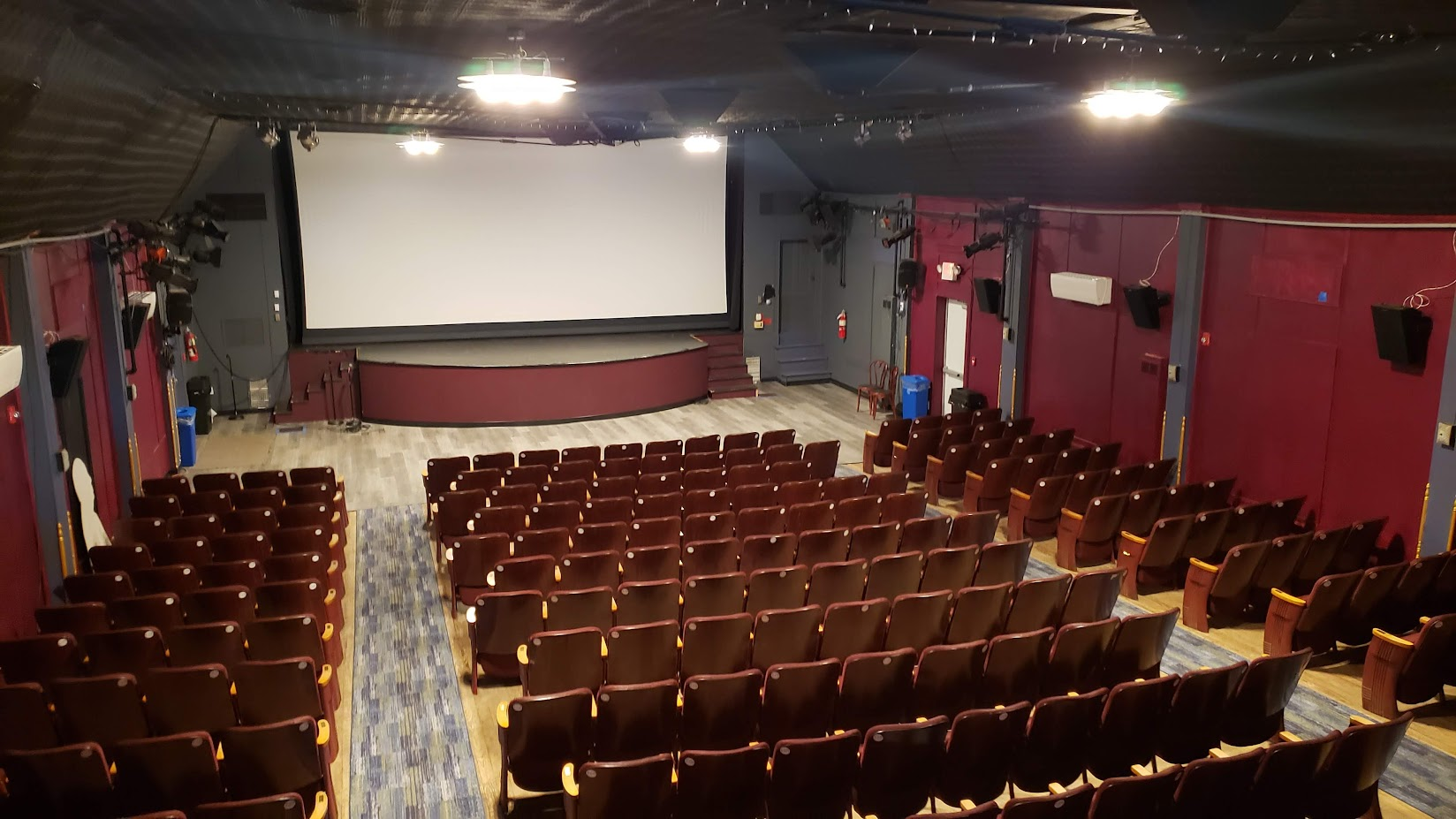
Rosendale Theatre seating as seen from the lighting and sound booth

For several years following its 1949 opening, the Theatre would only screen a movie for two days, with double features twice a week; about 300 different movies were shown each year. By rapidly introducing and removing movies from circulation, the Theatre became unpopular with film distributors, and was often forced to wait until after a film had been shown in nearby Kingston. This proved beneficial at times; the Theatre screened Chariots of Fire the same week it won the 1981 Academy Award for Best Picture. To compensate for its lack of first run films, the Theatre began showing independent films, films by local artists, and foreign art films. Longstanding patrons, dissatisfied with mainstream, sensationalist cinema, were generally receptive to the "more eclectic stuff". Avoiding first-run films for several weeks also allowed the Theatre to pay distributors a lower percentage of its gross profits on each film.

Anthony Cacchio Sr. had had a stroke by the late 1990s, but continued to work at the Theatre. He wore a suit to work each day, including the day before his death in 1998. That same year his grandson, Michael Cacchio, began to help run the Theatre. Michael Cacchio supported the introduction of live performances, and was the primary reason the Theatre began exhibiting art films, though his grandmother Fannie Cacchio remained the "power broker" who determined which movies were shown. She reputedly warned moviegoers if a film was of poor quality or obscene, and continued to work at the Theatre until her death in 2004.

The history of the Theatre was documented in an 8-minute, 26-second film by four local teenagers. The four were attending a screening of Fahrenheit 9/11 at the Theatre, during which a member of the audience announced that it was Fannie Cacchio's 93rd birthday. The teens, enrolled in a summer film camp, were seeking to create a documentary and decided to make the Theatre their subject. Filming took six weeks, wrapping around August 2004. In what a Daily Freeman reporter described as "[p]erhaps the most precious moment" of the film, Fannie Cacchio got out of her son's car and walked through the Theatre's doors, two weeks before her death. The documentary was shown in 2005, and again during the Theatre's 60th anniversary celebration in 2009.

By this time, the price of tickets had risen to $6 each, and popcorn was available for $1 per bag. Drinks, as well as brownies baked by Anthony Cacchio Jr., were also $1 each. The Theatre served as one of three screening locations for the Woodstock Film Festival, along with theaters in Rhinebeck and Woodstock. After years of resisting live entertainment, the Theatre allowed its stage to be used as a platform for a John Kerry rally on October 26, 2004. It was the first time there had been such an event in the building in over 55 years. By 2005, live performances were commonplace at the Theatre. The acoustics of the building also made it suitable for musical performances, beginning in autumn 2006 with a jazz performance by Kevin Mahogany.

=== Preservation campaign ===
The unexpected November 2008 death of Rocco Cacchio prompted the family to sell the business. In November 2009, a real estate developer offered to purchase the Theatre from the Cacchios, who sought between $400,000 and $500,000 for the property. A private local group, the Rosendale Theatre Collective (RTC), had formed in October 2009 to purchase and preserve the Theatre. The RTC was advised by a committee of 17 people, which included actors Aidan Quinn, David Strathairn, Melissa Leo, Denny Dillon, Mandy Patinkin, radio personality Bruce Morrow, screenwriter Ron Nyswaner, and author Kim Wozencraft.

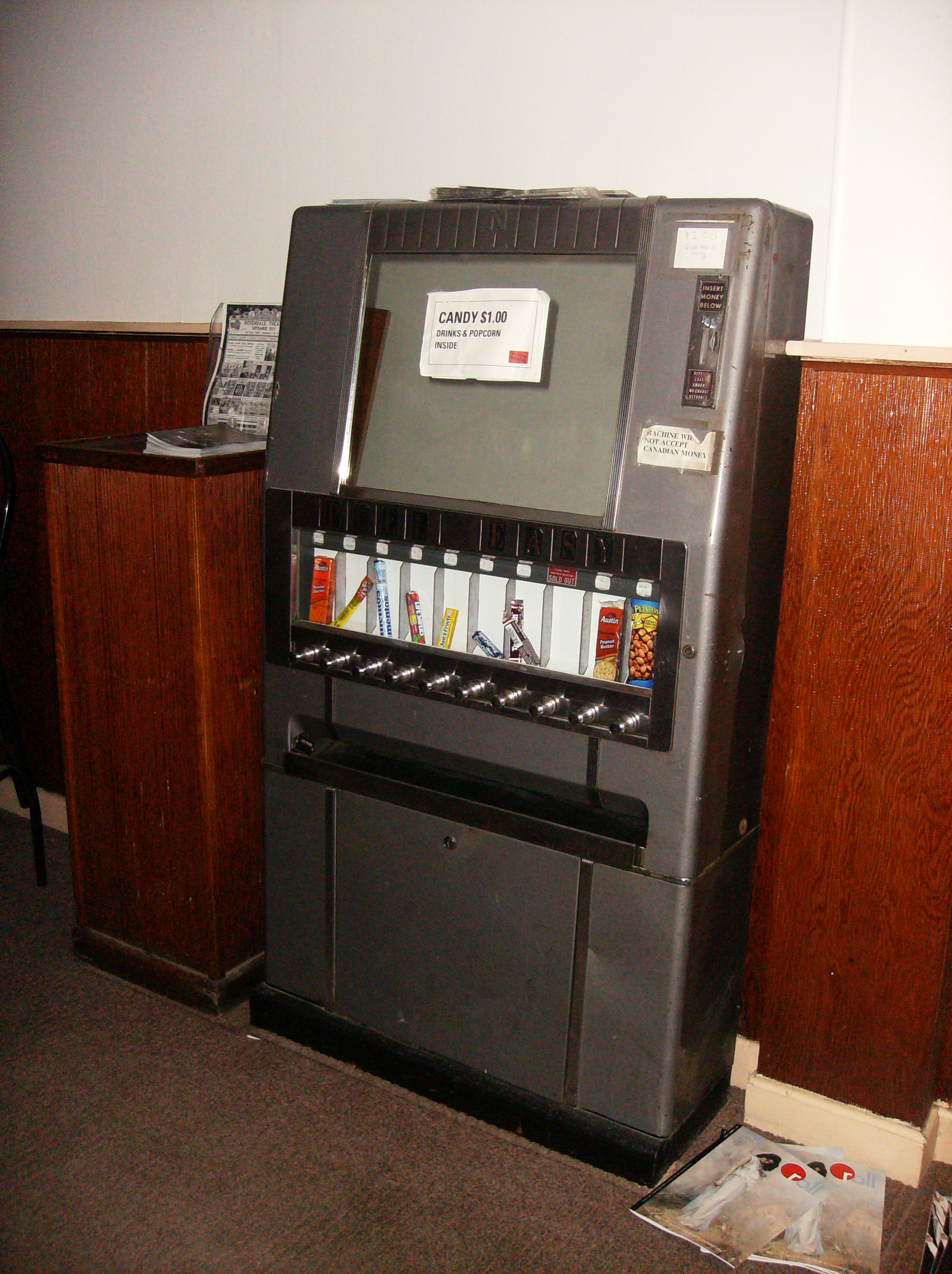
The Theatre's vending machine, installed shortly after the 1955 flood; Assemblyman Kevin Cahill urged its preservation

The group planned to raise a total of $100,000 for a down payment on the Theatre before a March 15, 2010 deadline, raising $13,000 by December 9, and reaching $25,000 by December 18. New York State Assemblyman Kevin Cahill indicated support for the group in his January 2010 newsletter. Cahill had enjoyed the Theatre as a child, and urged the RTC to "hang onto the vintage candy machine at all costs".

The Cacchios expressed a desire to sell the Theatre to the RTC rather than to developers, because the RTC consisted of friends of the family and other residents whom the Cacchios trusted to maintain and preserve the Theatre. To make the transfer of ownership easier, the Cacchios agreed to continue operating the Theatre until such a deal could be reached, and to assist in the operation of the Theatre after its sale to the RTC. By late February 2010 the RTC had raised $45,000, and needed to reach a total of $600,000. After a down payment of $160,000, and paying the full cost of the property, the remaining funds would cover renovations to the building. Over $8,000 was raised in a silent auction on February 28. More than 100 people attended the auction, including Congressman Maurice Hinchey.

By March 2010 the RTC had been approved as a 501(c) nonprofit organization. The group managed to raise between $55,000 and $80,000, less than half the amount required for the down payment, and the deadline was extended to May 15. A benefit on March 28 was expected to raise $5,000. One local newspaper, the Blue Stone Press, speculated that the RTC's 501(c) status would benefit the group financially. New York Times reporter Peter Applebome, feeling that "[o]ne of the best barometers of whether a small town has a pulse is the [condition of its] old downtown movie house", speculated that the effort to preserve the Theatre bode well for Rosendale.

The RTC entered the Pepsi Refresh Project on March 1, hoping to receive between $5,000 and $25,000 during the April competition. Created by PepsiCo in 2010 as a way to distribute $33 million that would otherwise fund its Super Bowl ads, the contest sought to provide funding for community projects. The ten projects receiving the most votes would each receive $50,000 grants. By April, the RTC was courting large institutions, such as IBM, for funding. Other planned activities designed to raise funds in April and May were a series of potlucks, a writing workshop, a music benefit, an online auction, and a screening of rare 1970s films at activist Jay Blotcher's house. Most of the RTC's funding came from individual donations between $25 and $100, and roughly 60 fundraisers were held in total.

The Theatre outpaced 362 other Pepsi Refresh entrants, and was in first place by the middle of April. The RTC attributed its success in the contest to its use of social networking services, notably Facebook. The group considered moving to a digital projector with the forthcoming grant to replace the existing projector, an expected cost of $100,000. By late May, the group had won the April competition and was waiting for the Pepsi funds, before tendering a down payment on the Theatre, initially planned for June 10. The closing date of the sale was pushed back to allow time to finalize the deal. In mid-June, the Playback Theatre planned a benefit for the RTC in which improv actors would perform skits based on audience members' stories of experiences they had at the Theatre.

=== Ownership by the Theatre Collective ===
That July, the RTC took out a $385,000 mortgage on the Theatre from two banks, the Rondout Savings Bank and the Ulster Savings Bank. After being run by the Cacchios for 61 years, the RTC assumed ownership of the Theatre on August 19, 2010. Announcing its intent to show the same kind of movies that the Theatre screened during the Cacchio's tenure, the group also agreed to continue exhibiting live acts, continue participating in the Woodstock Film Festival, renovate the building, and add digital equipment. The second and third floors may be renovated and used for offices, and as space for rehearsals and performances.

The RTC secured a new retractable screen by October 2010, from a New Windsor–based entertainment supplier, to replace the fixed screen that had obscured access to the Theatre's 15-foot (4.6 m) stage. The new screen opened the stage by 20 feet (6.1 m), allowing live acts. Under the Cacchios, the screen had been replaced once a decade, with an engineer performing maintenance once every six months. Eight Behringer stereo surround sound speakers and two subwoofers were installed in the building in December 2010. By February 2011, the RTC also added a digital projector, a stage thrust, a server for digital programming, and a new phone system. The group announced plans to add a concession stand, an additional server, and an uninterruptible power supply. The group also intended to move the ticket booth outside during warm months.

In late February 2011, Assemblyman Cahill helped the RTC secure a $175,000 state grant to pay for part of the $250,000 worth of renovations to the building. The renovations included improvements to the ticket and concession stands, and repairs to the Theatre's lighting system, roof, ceiling, and bathroom. It would also allow the RTC to buy new curtains and wall coverings, and to restore the building's exterior. That March, the town began applying for $300,000 to $500,000 in state grants to restore buildings on Main Street. The agency responsible for distributing the grants reported that the Theatre may be eligible for up to $250,000 in state funding to "help establish or expand [it] as a cultural or business anchor that is key to local revitalization efforts".

Anthony Cacchio Jr. continued to run the theater's projectors until his death in 2020, a job the 85-year-old had done since he was 16 years old.
