= Pepsi Refresh Project =

The Pepsi Refresh Project (PRP) was a 2010 initiative by PepsiCo to award $20 million in grants to individuals, businesses and non-profits that promote a new idea that has a positive impact on their community, state, or the nation. The project is completely separate from the Pepsi Corporate Foundation and uses money budgeted for marketing.

More than 80 million votes were registered and, at its peak, 37% of Americans were aware of the Refresh Project.

This project has been the focus of a 2013 Harvard Business School case ("The Pepsi Refresh Project: a Thirst for Change"), describing the process that Pepsi's marketing team, led by senior marketing director Ana Maria Irazabal, went through to come up with this idea.

In early 2012, Pepsi abandoned the Refresh Project. One opinion is due to declining market share and falling to third place behind Coke and Diet Coke.

== Rules ==
The PRP began on January 13, 2010 when the website, refresheverything.com began accepting ideas online. In contrast to the extensive requirements of Federal and Philanthropic organizations, the application process did not require skill in grant writing. The rules of the project state that the first 1,000 ideas proposed online each month will be considered for a share of $1.3 million available It took less than a week for one thousand "January" ideas to be submitted and the site stopped accepting ideas.

Voting started February 1, 2010 for the group of ideas proposed during January. On March 1, the first grants were announced in six categories: Health, Arts & Culture, Food & Shelter, the Planet, Neighborhoods and Education.

Up to 32 ideas may be selected every month in each of the following grant segments: $5K; $25K; $50K; and $250k. Individuals, non-profits, and socially beneficial businesses are eligible to compete in all categories.

In September 2010, the Pepsi Refresh Project was criticized for allowing a coalition of progressive, nonprofit organizations called the 'Progressive Slate' to participate in the project, accusing the company of violating its own terms.

=== Power votes ===
Codes printed on Pepsi sodas could be redeemed for "power votes", in a way a hybrid of a loyalty program and crowd funding. The soft drink marketer had placed an alphanumeric code under the caps of Pepsi, Diet Pepsi and Pepsi Max two-liter and 20-oz. bottles, as well as 12-pack and 24-pack carton wraps. Each code was worth between five and 100 votes; participants entered the code on the Power Vote page on the Pepsi Refresh site to find out its worth.

== Metrics ==
The Pepsi Refresh Project generated more than 80 million votes and "37% of Americans were aware of the Refresh Project".

The Pepsi Refresh Project included the risks associated with digital promotions, due to the nature of the campaign. "This was not corporate philanthropy. This was using brand dollars with the belief that when you use these brand dollars to have consumers share ideas to change the world, the consumers will win, the brand will win and the community will win. This was a big bet. No one has done it on this scale before", declares the head of digital, Shiv Singh.

== NFL ==
Prior to Super Bowl XLIV, the National Football League website hosted a one-week Pepsi Refresh Project contest for ideas suggested by NFL players. Drew Brees was the winner of the "Super Bowl Refresh Project" with more than half a million votes. A $100,000 grant was given to the Hope Lodge in New Orleans for no-cost housing of cancer patients and families.

== Gulf disaster ==
In response to the Deepwater Horizon oil spill, on July 12, 2010 a special competition was announced within the PRP: Do Good for the Gulf. An additional $1.3 million was committed to projects for communities in Alabama, Florida, Louisiana, Mississippi and Texas which were adversely affected by the disaster. The application period was a full month, the response was overwhelming, and 32 projects were funded with grants, which ranged from providing mental health services for oil disaster victims, to building seafood farms to help employ displaced workers, to creating shelters for animals that lost their homes.
