= List of Old Dominion University alumni =

The following are notable alumni from Old Dominion University in Norfolk, Virginia, United States.

| Name | Class year | Notability | References |
|---|---|---|---|
| Tahani Amer | 2011 | NASA engineer | |
| Maya Angelou | Attended | Poet | |
| Ben Bailey | | Comedian, host of Cash Cab | |
| Bootie Barker | 1994 | NASCAR crew chief | |
| Kent Bazemore | 2012 | Former NBA player, No. 24 retired for the ODU men's basketball program | |
| John Michael Bednarek | | Lieutenant general in the United States Army | |
| Shahar Biran | | Israeli tennis player | |
| Michael Bloomfield | 1993 | Space Shuttle and ISS astronaut; graduated from ODU with a master's in engineering management | |
| Derrick Borte | | Director | |
| Cal Bowdler | 1999 | Former NBA player for the Atlanta Hawks | |
| Tony Brothers | 1986 | Current NBA referee since 1994; officiated the 2012–2016 NBA Finals | |
| Ahmad Caver | 2019 | Basketball player in the Israeli Basketball Premier League | |
| Paul Diamond (Tom Boric) | | Professional wrestler, most notably in WWE; played soccer at ODU | |
| Tom DiCillo | | Film director, cinematographer and screenwriter; graduated from ODU before attending film school at NYU | |
| Anne Donovan | 1983 | Basketball player; 1983 Naismith College Player of the Year (the first woman to win that award); gold medalist as a player in the Summer Olympics in 1984 and 1988; coached the gold medal team in 2008; coached the Charlotte Sting to the 2001 WNBA finals and the 2004 Seattle Storm to the 2004 league title; inducted into the Naismith Memorial Basketball Hall of Fame in 1995 | |
| Thelma Drake | Attended | Former member of the United States House of Representatives | |
| Elizabeth Ashburn Duke | 1983 | Vice Chair of Wells Fargo's Board of Directors; former member of Governors of the Federal Reserve Systems | |
| William J. Fallon | 1982 | U.S. Navy admiral; Commander of the United States Central Command | |
| Jerome B. Friedman | 1965 | Judge of the United States District Court for the Eastern District of Virginia | |
| Travis Fulgham | 2019 | Former NFL player | |
| Chris Gatling | 1991 | Former NBA player | |
| Kenny Gattison | 1986 | Former NBA player | |
| Mills Godwin | | Two-term Governor of Virginia | |
| Wayne Gomes | | Former MLB player | |
| Adrienne Goodson | 1988 | WNBA basketball player | |
| Renée Good | 2020 | 2025 ICE Shooting Victim | |
| Benjamin S. Griffin | 1969 | Four-star general in the U.S. Army; assumed the duties of commanding general, U.S. Army Materiel Command on November 5, 2004 | |
| Jay Harris | 1987 | Professional sportscaster and SportsCenter anchor | |
| Frank Hassell | | Basketball player | |
| Taylor Heinicke | Attended | NFL quarterback (played as a starter for the Carolina Panthers, Washington Commanders, and Atlanta Falcons) | |
| Odell Hodge | 1997 | Men's basketball player | |
| Henry Howell | | Served in both houses of the Virginia General Assembly, was elected Lieutenant Governor of Virginia | |
| Daniel Hudson | 2008 | MLB pitcher | |
| Chad Hugo | Attended | Musician and producer in the Neptunes, also in rock group N.E.R.D.; briefly attended ODU on a music scholarship | |
| T. J. Jordan | 2008 | Basketball player | |
| Kenna | | Musician | |
| Ann Hitch Kilgore | | Mayor of Hampton, VA, 1963–71 and 1974–78 | |
| Jack T. Kirby | | Historian of the Southern United States; awarded the Bancroft Prize for his 2006 book Mockingbird Song: Ecological Landscapes of the South | |
| Nancy Lieberman | 2000 | Basketball player; inducted into the Basketball Hall of Fame in 1996; silver medalist in the 1976 Summer Olympics and two-time (1979 and 1980) Wade Trophy recipient | |
| Rick Lovato | 2015 | First ODU alumnus to play in a regular-season game as an NFL player; became a pro bowler in 2019 and won a Super Bowl championship with the Philadelphia Eagles in 2018 | |
| Elaine Luria | 2004 | Member of the U.S. House of Representatives from Virginia's 2nd district; former United States Navy Commander | |
| Magnum T. A. (Terry Allen) | Attended | Retired professional wrestler, most notably in the National Wrestling Alliance | |
| Ricardo Marsh | | American basketball player; 2007 top scorer in the Israel Basketball Premier League | |
| Donna W. Martin | 1988 | 18th United States Army Provost Marshal General (2020-present) | |
| Izak van der Merwe | 2005 | Professional tennis player | |
| Enid Montague | | Director of the Wellness and Health Enhancement Engineering Laboratory at DePaul University | |
| Tommy Newsom | | Assistant Musical Director of the Tonight Show band | |
| Tzipora Obziler | | Israeli tennis player | |
| Zach Pascal | 2016 | NFL player (Tennessee Titans, Indianapolis Colts, Philadelphia Eagles, Arizona Cardinals) | |
| Vinnie Pasquantino | 2017 | Professional baseball | |
| Shomi Patwary | | Director | |
| Dan Peek | | Musician in the band America | |
| Ticha Penicheiro | 1998 | WNBA basketball player with the Sacramento Monarchs | |
| L. Glenn Perry | 1967 | Chief Accountant of the United States Securities and Exchange Commission (1982-1984) and Senior Partner of KPMG | |
| Oliver Purnell | 1975 | Current Division I men's basketball coach at DePaul University | |
| Jodi Rell | | Governor of Connecticut (2004–11) | |
| Christy Goldsmith Romero | | Special Inspector General of the Troubled Asset Relief Program | |
| Winsome Sears | 1992 | Businesswoman, veteran, and politician who was the first black female Republican, first female veteran, the first naturalized citizen delegate to serve in the Virginia House of Delegates, and Lieutenant Governor of Virginia | |
| Deborah Shelton | | Winner of Miss USA 1970, and first runner-up Miss Universe 1970, acted in TV shows such as Dallas, Fantasy Island, The A-Team, T.J. Hooker, The Fall Guy, Cheers, The Love Boat and Nip/Tuck | |
| Shanon Slack | | All-American Wrestler, mixed martial artist for Bellator | |
| Stone Smartt | 2021 | NFL player (Los Angeles Chargers) | |
| Frank Sturgis | | Watergate burglar, CIA operative | |
| Terrie Suit | | Former Virginia Secretary of Homeland Security and Veterans Affairs, former member of the Virginia House of Delegates | |
| Dave Twardzik | | Former NBA player | |
| Valdas Vasylius | 2007 | Lithuanian basketball player | |
| Brandon Vera | Attended | Former UFC mixed martial artist, ONE FC Heavyweight Champion | |
| Justin Verlander | | MLB pitcher (Detroit Tigers, Houston Astros) | |
| Mark West | 1983 | Former NBA player | |
| Oshane Ximines | 2019 | NFL player (New York Giants) | |
