= Enid Montague =

American engineer and bioinformatician

- Education: Old Dominion University (BS); Virginia Tech (MS, PhD)
- Awards: US-UK Fulbright scholar UK Fulbright Commission (2018); HFES Early-Career Service Award Human Factors and Ergonomics Society (2014)
- Scientific career
- Workplaces: DePaul University; Northwestern University; University of Wisconsin–Madison
- Thesis: (2008)
- Website: enidmontague.com

Enid Montague is an American scholar and researcher in the fields of human factors engineering, health informatics, and human-computer interaction. Montague is currently an associate professor of Mechanical and Industrial Engineering at the University of Toronto in Toronto, Ontario Canada. She was formerly a professor of health informatics and the director of the Wellness and Health Enhancement Engineering Laboratory (WHEEL) in the college of computing at DePaul University, Chicago, United States. She is also an adjunct professor at Northwestern University Feinberg School of Medicine. Her work is focused on human centered automation in medicine, specifically the role of trust of both patient and employees in the healthcare ecosystem and new technologies in medicine, such as artificial intelligence and electronic health records. She leverages human factors and human-computer interaction methodologies to inform her work with the goal of creating and improving medical technology that is patient-centered.

== Early life and education ==
Montague was born in Yorktown, Virginia. Her interest in technology and computer science began in her youth as a Girl Scout and Explorer Scout, one of the first coed scouting programs in Boy Scouts of America and through her experiences at NASA-Langley. Montague finished her MS and PhD degrees in industrial and systems engineering from Virginia Tech in 2008.

== Research ==
Montague’s research has significantly impacted the field of healthcare by integrating principles of human factors engineering into the design of medical systems. Her work aims to reduce medical errors, enhance patient safety, and improve the overall efficiency of healthcare delivery. She has published extensively in top-tier journals and has received numerous grants and awards for her research.

One of her notable contributions is her research on the usability of electronic health records (EHRs). Montague has explored how the design of EHRs affects healthcare providers' workflow and patient care. Her findings have informed the development of more intuitive and efficient EHR systems.

She has contributed over 100 publications (>2,000 citations) to the field of health informatics including work on human-computer interaction, health information technology, human factors and ergonomics, consumer health technology, and trust.

== Journalism ==
Montague writes on medical technology and is a contributing author at U.S. News & World Report. She has also contributed opinions and editorials for Scientific American, Muck Rack, and DX Latest.

== Awards and honors ==
- 2024- Canada Research Chair in Human-Centred Automation
- 2018 US - UK Fulbright Commission at the Loughborough Design School at Loughborough University
- 2014 Human Factors and Ergonomics Society (HFES) Bentzi Karsh Early-Career Service Award
- 2009 National Institutes of Health Clinical Scientist Institutional Career Development Program Award
- 2008 Virginia Tech Industrial and Systems Engineering Acclaimed Alum
- 2008 Francis Research Fellow
