= Justin Verlander =

American baseball player (born 1983)

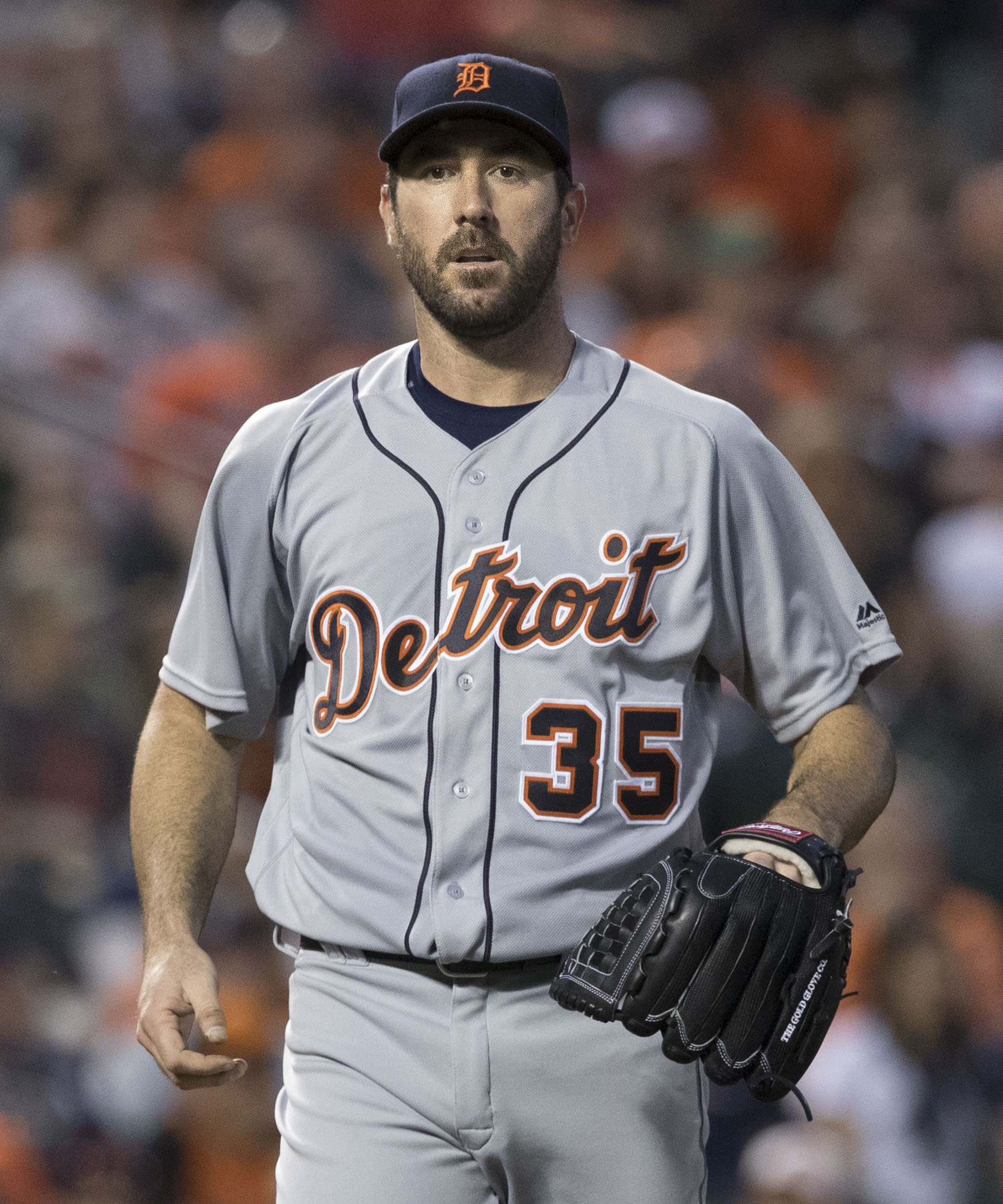
- Verlander with the Detroit Tigers in 2016
- Pitcher
- Born: February 20, 1983 (age 43); Manakin Sabot, Virginia, U.S.
- Batted: Right Threw: Right

MLB debut
- July 4, 2005, for the Detroit Tigers

Last MLB appearance
- September 26, 2026, for the Detroit Tigers

MLB statistics
- Win–loss record: 266–159
- Earned run average: 3.33
- Strikeouts: 3,560
- Stats at Baseball Reference

Teams
- Detroit Tigers (2005–2017); Houston Astros (2017–2020, 2022); New York Mets (2023); Houston Astros (2023–2024); San Francisco Giants (2025); Detroit Tigers (2026)

Career highlights and awards
- 10× All-Star (2007, 2009–2013, 2018, 2019, 2022, 2026); 2× World Series champion (2017, 2022); AL MVP (2011); 3× AL Cy Young Award (2011, 2019, 2022); Triple Crown (2011); 2× All-MLB First Team (2019, 2022); AL Rookie of the Year (2006); ALCS MVP (2017); AL Comeback Player of the Year (2022); 4× AL wins leader (2009, 2011, 2019, 2022); 2× AL ERA leader (2011, 2022); 5× AL strikeout leader (2009, 2011, 2012, 2016, 2018); Pitched three no-hitters (2007, 2011, 2019); MLB records: Most career postseason strikeouts: 244
Medals
Men's baseball
Representing United States
Pan American Games
Silver medal – second place	2003 Santo Domingo	Team competition

Justin Brooks Verlander (/ˈvɜːrlændər/ VUR-land-ər; born February 20, 1983) is an American former professional baseball pitcher. He played 21 seasons in Major League Baseball (MLB) for the Detroit Tigers, Houston Astros, New York Mets, and San Francisco Giants from 2005 to 2026. A three-time Cy Young Award winner, an American League Most Valuable Player Award recipient, and a two-time World Series champion, Verlander is considered one of the greatest pitchers in baseball history.

Born in Manakin Sabot, Virginia, Verlander attended Old Dominion University (ODU) and played college baseball for the Monarchs. He broke the Monarchs' and Colonial Athletic Association's career records for strikeouts. At the 2003 Pan American Games, Verlander helped lead the United States national team to a silver medal. The Tigers selected Verlander with the second overall pick of the 2004 MLB draft, and he made his major league debut with the Tigers in 2005. He was the AL Rookie of the Year in 2006. In 2007, Verlander pitched the first no-hitter at Comerica Park. In 2009, he led the AL in wins and strikeouts, both for the first time. Verlander produced his most successful season in 2011, pitching his second career no-hitter and winning the Pitching Triple Crown, the AL Cy Young Award (unanimously), the AL MVP Award, and the Sporting News Player of the Year Award. Verlander played for Detroit for 12 years, becoming the ace in their starting rotation and a key figure in four consecutive AL Central division championships (2011–2014) and two AL pennants (in 2006 and 2012).

The Tigers traded Verlander to the Astros before the 2017 trade deadline, and he went undefeated in his first five starts heading into the postseason. He was named AL Championship Series MVP and was co-winner of the Babe Ruth Award as the Astros won the 2017 World Series. In 2018, Verlander earned his 200th career win. In 2019, Verlander became the sixth pitcher in MLB history to throw three career no-hitters. He also had his first career 300-strikeout season and won his second Cy Young award while leading the Astros to their second pennant in three seasons. Verlander missed most of the 2020 season and all of the 2021 season due to injury. He returned in 2022 and proceeded to win 18 games with a sub-2.00 ERA on his way to leading the Astros to their second world championship. He received his third Cy Young Award that offseason, making him the first Astro to win multiple Cy Young Awards. Verlander signed with the Mets in December 2022, was traded back to the Astros in August 2023, and signed with the Giants in January 2025. Following one season in San Francisco, Verlander returned to the Tigers on a one-year contract in 2026; halfway through the season, he announced that he would be retiring at the end of the 2026 season.

Verlander was a 10-time MLB All-Star and led the AL in strikeouts five times, in earned run average twice, and in wins three times. He is one of eleven pitchers all-time to record 3,500 career strikeouts, and ranks eighth all-time as of his retirement with a total of 3,560.

== Early life ==
Justin Brooks Verlander was born on February 20, 1983, in Manakin Sabot, Virginia. Verlander played Little League at Tuckahoe Little League in Richmond, Virginia. Verlander's father Richard sent him to The Richmond Baseball Academy when he was young. He was able to throw an 84 mph (135 km/h) fastball shortly after joining the academy. His velocity plateaued at 86 mph (138 km/h) during his senior year at Goochland High School, during which he was sidetracked by strep throat.

== College career ==
Verlander's velocity increased to 87 mph (140 km/h) during his first year with Old Dominion. Verlander, a 6 ft 5 in (1.96 m), 200 lb (91 kg) right-handed pitcher, played for the Old Dominion University baseball team for three years. On May 17, 2002, he struck out a then-school record 17 batters against James Madison. In 2003, he set a school single-season record by recording 139 strikeouts. In 2004, he broke his own record establishing a new Colonial Athletic Association (CAA) record with 151 strikeouts. Verlander completed his career as the all-time strikeout leader at ODU, the CAA, and the Commonwealth of Virginia (Division I) history with 427 in 335 2/3 innings. During his three years, he averaged 11.5 strikeouts per nine innings and his career collegiate earned run average (ERA) was 2.57.

He was named CAA Rookie of the Year in 2002 and earned All-CAA honors in 2003 and 2004. Verlander was named the ODU Alumni Association's Male Athlete of the Year in 2004 and was the second overall pick in the 2004 Major League Baseball draft by the Detroit Tigers.

== Professional career ==
=== Draft and minor leagues ===
Verlander's professional baseball career began when he was selected by the Detroit Tigers with the second overall pick in the 2004 MLB draft. He signed a contract on October 25, 2004. Verlander made his professional debut in 2005. He played for two of Detroit's minor league affiliates: the Lakeland Flying Tigers (High-A) and the Erie SeaWolves (Double-A), and also started two games for the Tigers in July. After posting a 9–2 record and a 1.67 ERA in 13 starts for Lakeland, Verlander joined the SeaWolves on June 20.

=== Detroit Tigers (2005–2017) ===
==== 2005–2006: MLB debut, AL Rookie of the Year, and World Series ====
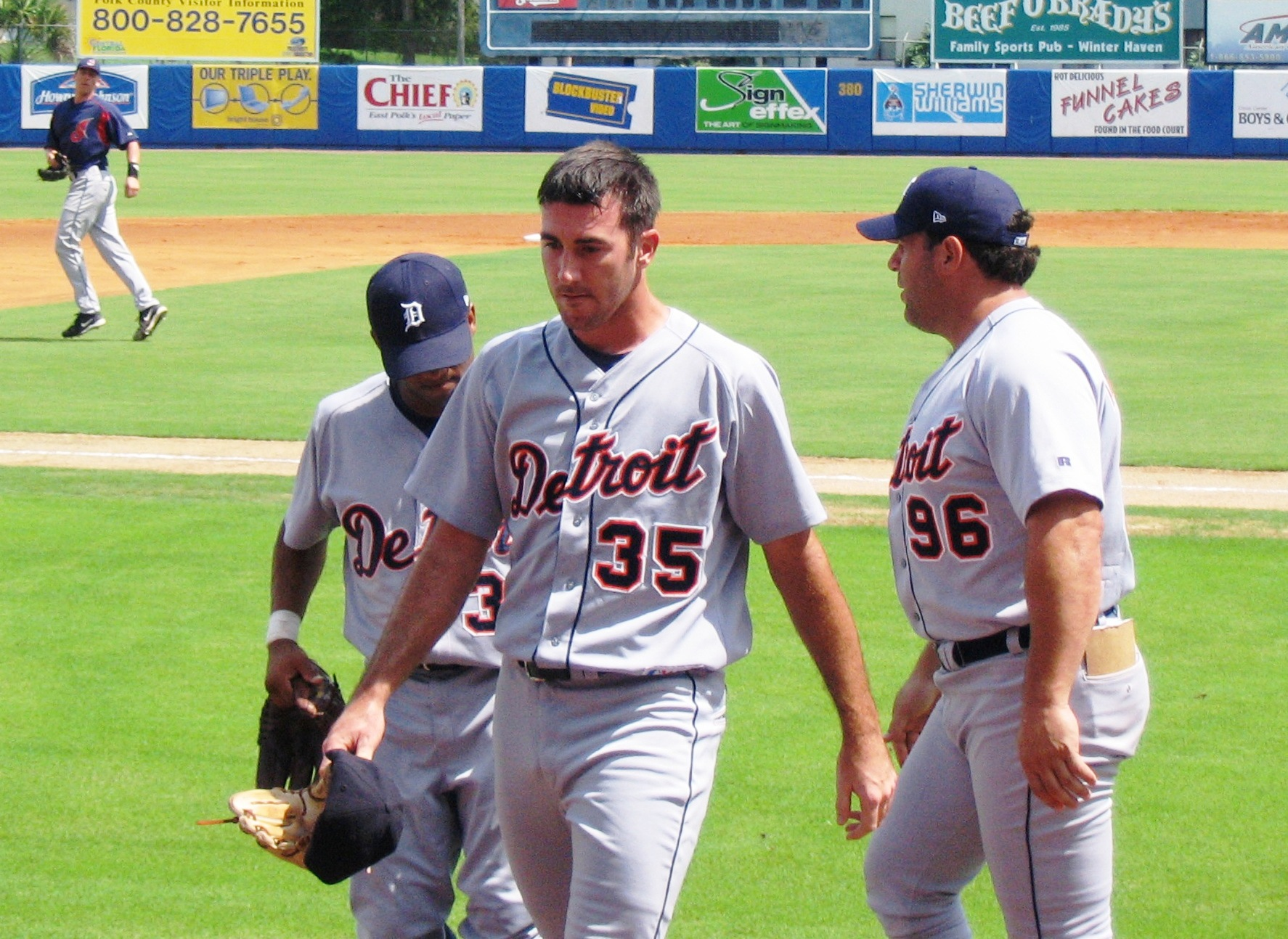
Verlander (center) in the Florida Instructional League in September 2005

Verlander made his MLB debut on July 4, 2005. He went 0–2 with a 7.15 ERA in his only two starts of the season.

He made the 2006 Tigers roster out of spring training. In his first full Major League season, Verlander went 17–9 with a 3.63 ERA, striking out 124 batters in 186 innings. On July 4, 2006, at McAfee Coliseum in Oakland, California, Verlander, Joel Zumaya, and Fernando Rodney each threw multiple fastballs over 100 mph (160 km/h). It was the first time in MLB history that three pitchers on the same team had done so during a game. He allowed one stolen base in 2006 and picked off seven baserunners. In 2006, he became the first rookie pitcher in the history of the game to win 10 games before the end of June and was named AL Rookie of the Year at the end of the season. During Game 1 of the 2006 World Series, Verlander was the Tigers starting pitcher against Anthony Reyes of the St. Louis Cardinals; it was the first instance in which two rookies faced off to start a World Series. The Tigers went on to lose the series to the Cardinals in five games.

==== 2007–2008: First no-hitter and All-Star Game ====
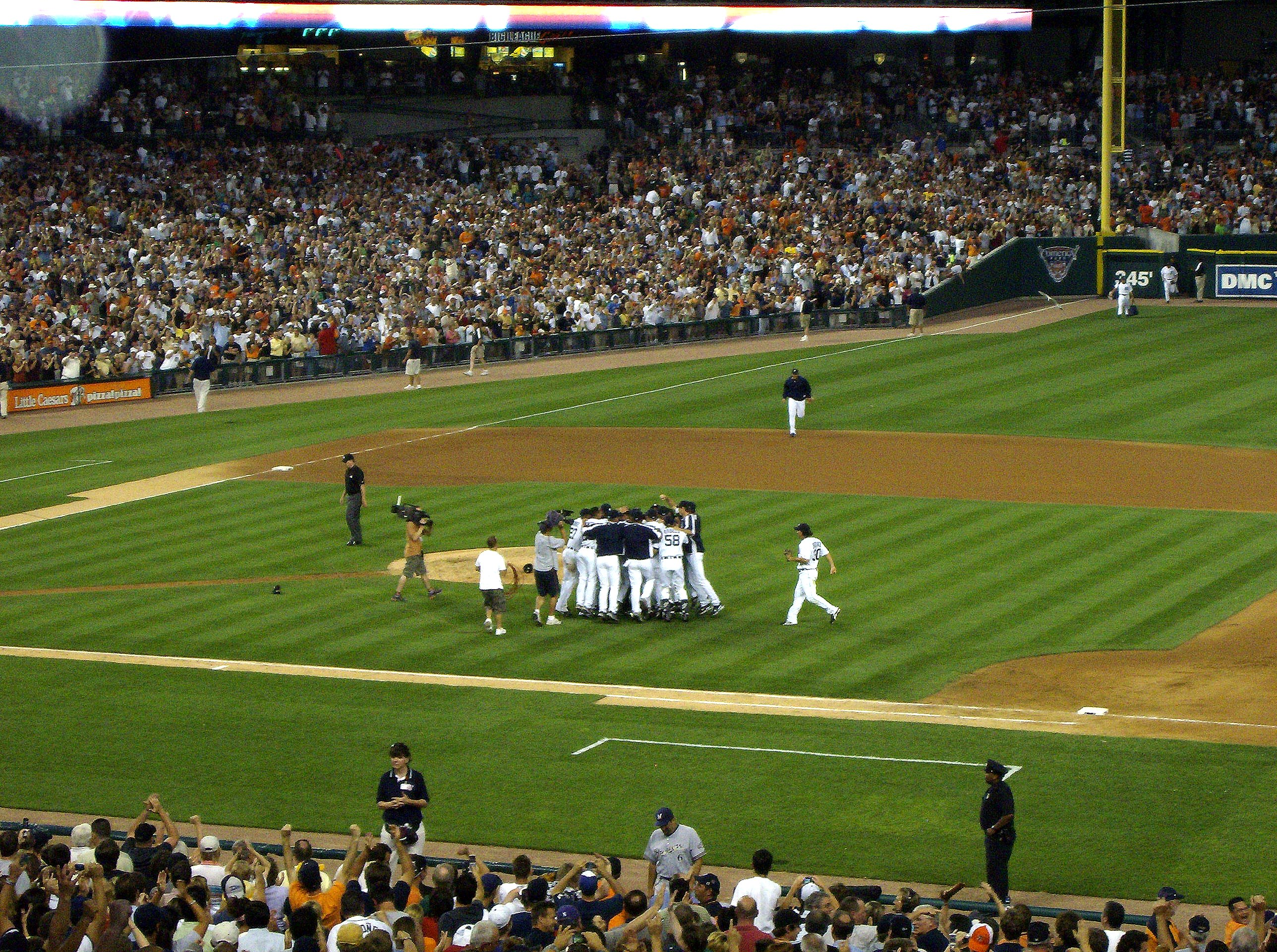
Verlander and his teammates celebrate after the final out of his first no-hitter.

Verlander's success continued in 2007, as he accumulated 18 wins and posted a 3.66 ERA with 183 strikeouts in 201 2/3 innings. On June 12, Verlander recorded a no-hitter against the Milwaukee Brewers, striking out twelve and walking four while throwing a fastball 102 mph (164 km/h).

In 2008, Verlander lost four consecutive games before winning his first one. He led MLB in losses with 17. Overall, he finished the 2008 season with an 11–17 win-loss record and a 4.84 ERA.

==== 2009–2010: First-time major league wins and strikeouts leader ====
Verlander became the first Major League starter in 24 years to load the bases with nobody out in the ninth inning or later and get out of it without allowing a run when he pulled off the feat on July 24, 2009. Then-Mariners hurler Mike Moore was the last to do it, on September 16, 1985. He finished the 2009 season with a 19–9 record, an ERA of 3.45 and an MLB-leading 269 strikeouts, the most by a Tiger since Mickey Lolich's 308 in 1971, while his 10.1/9 IP strikeout rate led all American League starters. His 19 wins led the majors this season. Verlander finished third in the AL Cy Young Award voting behind winner Zack Greinke and runner-up Félix Hernández.

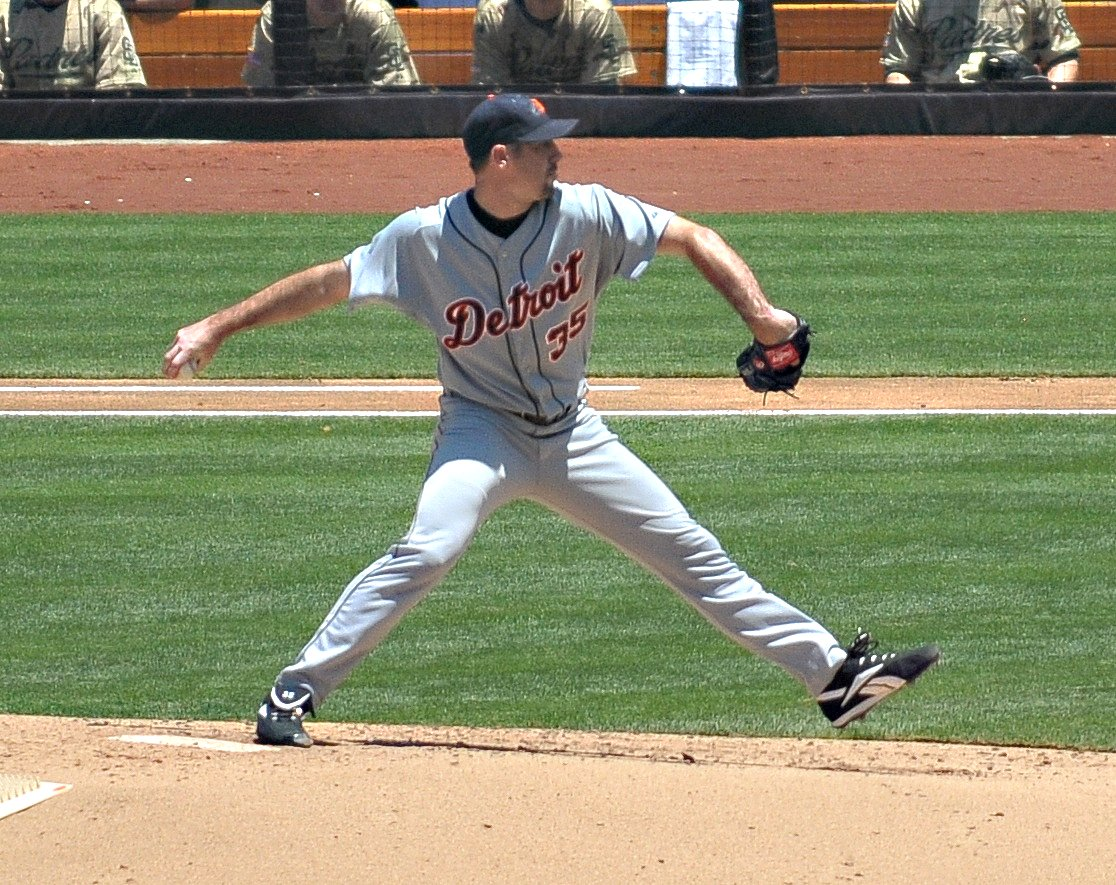
Verlander pitching in 2008

In the offseason, Verlander and the Tigers reached a deal for a five-year, $80 million contract extension. On July 3, Verlander earned his 10th win of the 2010 season. This marked the fourth time in five years he has had double-digit wins before the All-Star break. On September 18, Verlander beat the Chicago White Sox throwing a complete game to earn his 17th win of the season. Verlander was the first pitcher to win 17 games in four of his first five seasons since Dwight Gooden. He finished the 2010 season with an 18–9 record and a 3.37 ERA while fanning 219 batters in 224 1/3 innings.

==== 2011: Second no-hitter, first Cy Young award-winning season ====
On April 22, 2011, Verlander recorded his 1,000th career strikeout in a 9–3 win over the White Sox, becoming the 15th Tiger to do so. On May 7, he recorded his second career no-hitter against the Toronto Blue Jays, throwing four strikeouts, walking one batter, and throwing at a maximum speed of 101 mph (163 km/h) on the radar gun. He carried a perfect game into the eighth inning before allowing a walk to J. P. Arencibia, who was the only Blue Jays batter to reach base in the game. Arencibia was erased on a double play, so Verlander faced a minimum of 27 batters for the game. He became the second Tigers pitcher since Virgil Trucks, and the 30th pitcher in the history of baseball, to throw multiple no-hitters. On his next start, against the Kansas City Royals on May 13 Verlander took a no-hitter into the sixth inning before surrendering a triple. Altogether, he pitched 15 2/3 consecutive no-hit innings which were spread over three starts.

On June 14, Verlander took a no-hitter into the eighth inning. He pitched 7 1/3 innings until he gave up a base hit to Cleveland's Orlando Cabrera. Verlander ended up with a complete-game shutout, allowing two hits. In his next start on June 19, he threw another complete game allowing only a solo home run to Ty Wigginton. On June 25, he recorded a career-high 14 strikeouts against Arizona. Verlander was selected to his fourth AL All-Star team but he was unable to participate in the game due to the scheduling of his starts.

On July 31, Verlander took a no-hitter into the eighth inning against the Los Angeles Angels before surrendering a single to Maicer Izturis. He walked two and struck out nine. On August 11, Verlander won his 100th major league game against the Cleveland Indians. A victory on August 27 made Verlander the first Tiger since Bill Gullickson in 1991 to win 20 games, and the first Major League pitcher since Curt Schilling in 2002 to reach 20 wins before the end of August.

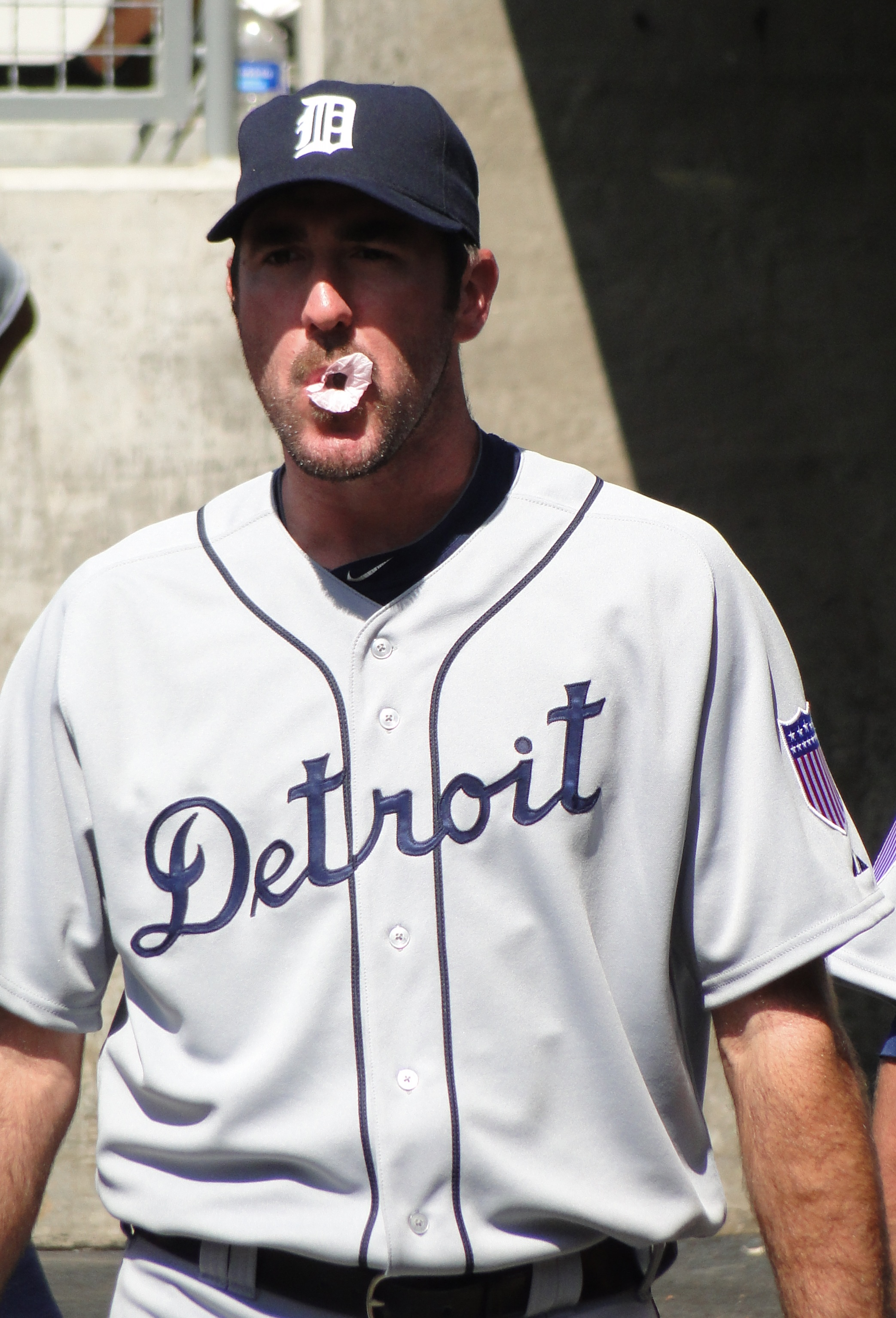
Verlander in 2011

By the end of the season, Verlander had won the Triple Crown of pitching in the AL, leading the league in wins (24), strikeouts (250; tied for sixth most in Tigers history) and ERA (2.40). Los Angeles Dodgers left-handed pitcher Clayton Kershaw had clinched the National League (NL) Triple Crown earlier in the week, making it the first season since 1924 featuring a Triple Crown pitcher in both leagues. Verlander also led the AL in innings pitched (251) and win-loss percentage (.828; sixth-best in Tigers history), while posting a Major League best 0.92 WHIP. As of 2025, Verlander remains the most recent pitcher to have pitched 250 innings in one season. Throughout the season, he never had an outing in which he threw fewer than six innings or 100 pitches. Through 2011, Verlander had the best career strikeouts/9 innings percentage in Tigers history (8.3), and the second-best career win-loss percentage (.652; also the fourth-best percentage of all active pitchers).

In 2011, Verlander received the AL Sporting News Pitcher of the Year Award, Sporting News Player of the Year Award, a Players Choice Award for Player the Year and Most Outstanding American League pitcher, and a USA Today American League Cy Young. Verlander was named the cover athlete of Major League Baseball 2K12.

Verlander won both the 2011 AL Cy Young Award and the AL MVP Award. He was the first pitcher to claim an AL MVP Award since Dennis Eckersley in 1992, the first starting pitcher to do so since Roger Clemens in 1986, and the fourth Tigers pitcher to do so in franchise history, joining Denny McLain (1968), Hal Newhouser (1944, 1945), and Willie Hernández (1984). Verlander unanimously won the 2011 AL Cy Young Award and also won the AL MVP in a much closer vote. Verlander edged out Boston's Jacoby Ellsbury, 280 points to 242 points while collecting 13 of 28 first-place votes. He became the second pitcher in baseball history after Don Newcombe to win the Rookie of the Year, Cy Young, and MVP awards in his career.

==== 2012: Cy Young runner-up, All-Star, and World Series ====
On May 18, 2012, Verlander took a no-hitter into the ninth inning against the Pittsburgh Pirates before giving up a one-out single in a 6–0 victory. It was his first career complete-game one-hitter, his 16th complete game overall, and sixth career shutout. Verlander, who struck out 12 in the game, was hitting the upper-90s and 100 mph (160 km/h) into the eighth inning.

Verlander was named to the American League team roster and AL starting pitcher in the All-Star Game. Verlander was joined by teammates Prince Fielder and Miguel Cabrera, the former voted as a starter. At the All-Star break, Verlander had a 9–5 record and a 2.58 ERA in 18 games, and was leading the AL in innings pitched (132 2/3), strikeouts (128) and complete games (five). In a forgettable All-Star game, he pitched one inning and gave up five runs. Verlander finished the 2012 regular season with a 17–8 record. He ranked first in the American League in innings pitched (238 1/3), strikeouts (239) and complete games (six), while also ranking second in ERA (2.64).

In the 2012 ALDS against the Oakland Athletics, Verlander started Game 1 and won a 3–1 decision. In the deciding fifth game of the series, he pitched a complete-game shutout allowing four hits as the Tigers won 6–0 and advanced to the 2012 ALCS. Verlander, who struck out 11 in each of his ALDS starts became the first pitcher in MLB history to record more than 10 strikeouts in a winner-take-all postseason shutout. Verlander's 22 strikeouts in the series set a record for an ALDS.

Verlander made his only appearance in the 2012 ALCS in Game 3 against the New York Yankees. He earned a 2–1 win, blanking the Yankees hitters on two hits through eight innings before surrendering a leadoff home run in the ninth inning to Eduardo Núñez. Having given up one run in the first inning of Game 1 in the ALDS, and one run in the ninth inning of Game 3 in the ALCS, Verlander recorded 24 consecutive scoreless postseason innings in between.

He pitched Game 1 of the 2012 World Series against the San Francisco Giants and gave up five earned runs in four innings pitched, including giving up two home runs to eventual World Series MVP Pablo Sandoval as the Tigers were swept in the Series.

Verlander finished second to David Price of the Tampa Bay Rays in a close AL Cy Young Award race. Verlander collected 149 points (12 first-place votes) to Price's 153 points (13 first-place votes). Verlander won (tie with David Price) his second consecutive AL Sporting News Pitcher of the Year Award.

==== 2013 ====
Prior to the 2013 season, Verlander and the Tigers reached an agreement on a seven-year, $180 million contract, with a $22 million vesting option for 2020 if he finished in the top five in Cy Young Award voting in 2019. This contract made him the highest-paid pitcher in MLB history.

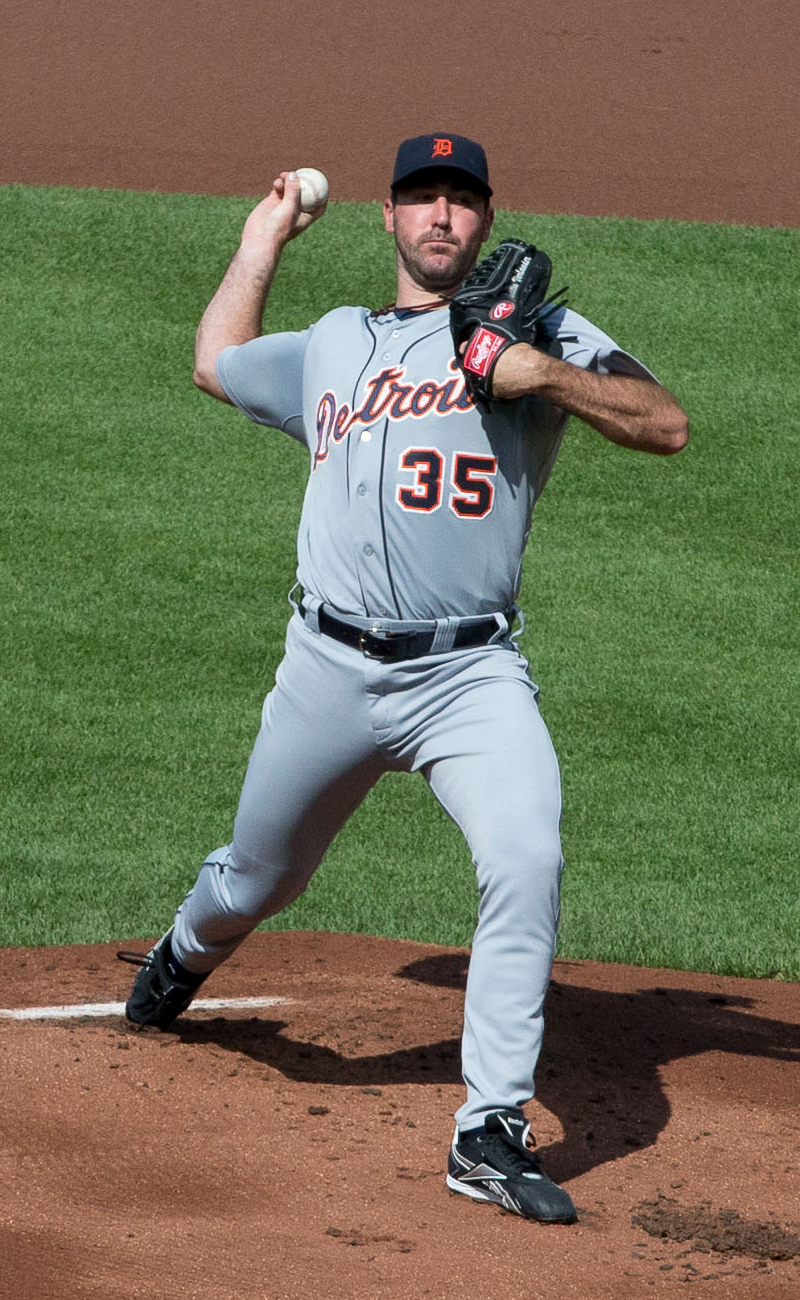
Verlander in June 2013

Verlander made his sixth-consecutive Opening Day start for the Tigers against the Minnesota Twins at Target Field in Minneapolis and won 4–2. In a May 11 game against the Cleveland Indians, Verlander recorded his 1,500th career strikeout.

Verlander was selected as a reserve pitcher for the American League All-Star team by his manager, Jim Leyland, who managed the 2013 AL team. It was Verlander's sixth All-Star selection, but due to him starting a game on July 14 for the Tigers, he was declared unavailable for the July 16 All-Star game. Entering the All-Star break, Verlander had a 10–6 record, 125 strikeouts and a 3.50 ERA.

Verlander finished the 2013 regular season with a 13–12 record, a 3.46 ERA, and 217 strikeouts. His 218 1/3 innings pitched were the lowest total since his 2008 season.

In Game 2 of the 2013 ALDS, Verlander struck out eleven Oakland Athletics hitters in seven shutout innings. Verlander did not get the win as the Tigers lost the game, 1–0, in the bottom of the ninth inning. In Game 5 of the same series, Verlander pitched eight shutout innings with ten strikeouts in a 3–0 victory and taking a no-hitter into the 7th inning. The win sent the Tigers to the American League Championship Series for the third consecutive year. Verlander defeated the Athletics in Game 5 of the ALDS for the second straight season and is one of four starting pitchers in Major League history to have multiple wins in elimination postseason games, joining Bob Gibson, Chris Carpenter, and Matt Cain.

Verlander threw 30 consecutive scoreless innings in the postseason against the Athletics, a major league record for a pitcher versus one team, surpassing Christy Mathewson's 28 scoreless innings against the Philadelphia Athletics from 1905 to 1911. Verlander is the second pitcher in Major League history with ten or more strikeouts and no runs allowed in back-to-back postseason games, joining Sandy Koufax in Games 5 and 7 of the 1965 World Series.

In Game 3 of the ALCS against the Boston Red Sox, Verlander threw 6 1/3 scoreless innings (running his 2013 postseason scoreless streak to 21 1/3 innings) before surrendering a solo home run to Mike Napoli in the seventh. Despite giving up only that one run and striking out ten batters in eight innings, Verlander lost a 1–0 decision. It was Verlander's sixth career postseason game with ten or more strikeouts, more than any other pitcher in MLB postseason history.

The eventual World Series champ Red Sox eliminated the Tigers in six ALCS games. In the 2013 postseason, Verlander was 1–1 with a 0.39 ERA and 31 strikeouts in 23 postseason innings; two of his starts involved the Tigers scoring no runs.

==== 2014 ====
On January 9, 2014, Verlander underwent core muscle surgery. The Tigers thought Verlander might miss Opening Day in the aftermath of his surgery, but he recovered in time to join pitchers and catchers reporting to spring training in late February. On March 16, Tiger manager Brad Ausmus announced that Verlander would make his seventh consecutive opening-day start on March 31. On April 12, Verlander got the first two hits of his major league career during a 6–2 road win over the San Diego Padres. This snapped a career 0-for-26 string.

Verlander struggled in the first half of 2014. His strikeouts were down to 6.8 per nine innings pitched, as opposed to an average of 9.2 over the last five years. His ERA and WHIP in the season's first half were also elevated to 4.71 and 1.49 respectively. Verlander was not named to the AL All-Star team for the first time since 2008, snapping a streak of five straight appearances.

On August 11, in a game against the Pittsburgh Pirates, Verlander allowed five runs, four earned, on four hits in only one inning. Verlander left the game with right shoulder soreness in the shortest outing of his career. His previous shortest outing was 1 1/3 innings in 2008. Verlander would miss his next start, the first time that had occurred in his career.

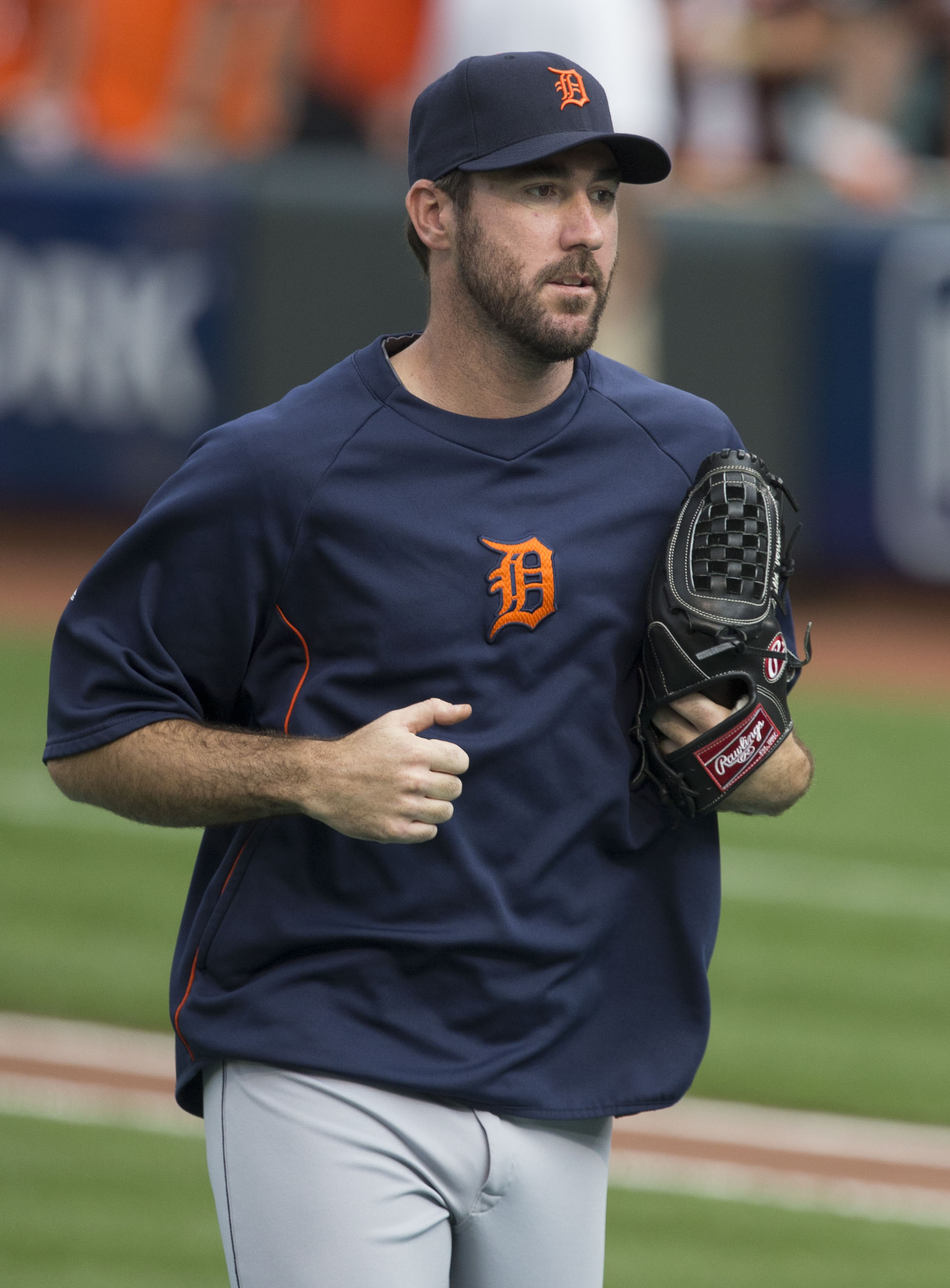
Verlander before Game 1 of the 2014 AL Division Series

Verlander fared somewhat better in the second half of 2014. His season ERA and WHIP dropped to 4.54 and 1.398, respectively. He won his final three decisions to finish with a 15–12 record, and the Tigers won 6 of his last 8 starts. His strikeout rate remained low, however finishing with 159 strikeouts and a 6.9 K/9 IP rate, both the lowest since his 2006 rookie season. He mentioned in 2018 that he had not fully recovered from the core surgery during the 2014 season, contributing to production inferior to his career norms.

==== 2015 ====
Verlander started the 2015 season on the disabled list due to a right triceps strain, ending his streak of seven consecutive Opening Day starts for the Tigers. This marked the first time Verlander had been placed on the DL in his major league career, following 298 career starts and 1,978 innings pitched. He had thrown more pitches than any other pitcher since his rookie season in 2006, with 32,535 pitches in the regular season, and 1,688 pitches in the postseason.

On May 31, Verlander was sent to the Triple-A Toledo Mud Hens for a rehab assignment. It was his first time ever pitching for the Mud Hens, having gone straight from Double-A to the major leagues in 2005. He threw 79 pitches, 50 for strikes, allowing six hits and two walks in 2 2/3 innings. He fared better in his second rehab start on June 6, lasting 5 2/3 innings and throwing 93 pitches (69 for strikes). He gave up just one unearned run on four hits and no walks while striking out nine batters. Verlander made his season debut with the Tigers on June 13 against the Cleveland Indians. He pitched five innings, giving up two runs on three hits and two walks while striking out two. He left the game with a 3–2 lead but got a no-decision as the Indians came back against the Tiger bullpen to win the game. In his next start on June 19, Verlander gave up Alex Rodriguez's 3,000th career hit, a home run.

On August 26, Verlander came within three outs of his third career no-hitter before allowing a double to Chris Iannetta, the first batter in the ninth inning. He finished the game with one hit, two walks, and nine strikeouts in a 5–0 victory over the Los Angeles Angels. This was his seventh career complete-game shutout and second career complete-game one-hitter. Verlander finished 2015 with a 5–8 record in 20 starts, but his other stats were a considerable improvement over the previous season. He had a 3.38 ERA and 1.088 WHIP. His walk rate dropped to 2.2 while his strikeout rate inched back up to 7.6.

==== 2016: Cy Young runner-up, American League strikeout leader and 2,000 career strikeouts ====
On May 8, Verlander recorded his 1,981st strikeout in his Tiger career, surpassing Jack Morris for second place on the list of all-time Tiger strikeout leaders, trailing only Mickey Lolich, who notched 2,679 strikeouts for the team. On May 18, Verlander fanned Eddie Rosario of the Twins for his 2,000th career strikeout, becoming just the second Tigers pitcher to reach the milestone following Lolich. Verlander went into the 2016 All-Star break with an 8–6 record, 4.07 ERA, 1.13 WHIP, and 120 strikeouts in 117 1/3 innings (9.2 K/9).

Verlander was named the American League Pitcher of the Month for July. He was 4–0 with a 1.69 ERA in six July starts, holding opposing hitters to a .171 average, and striking out 48 batters in 42 2/3 innings. Among qualifying starters in the AL (minimum 28.0 innings pitched), Verlander finished July first in strikeouts, tied for first in innings pitched, third in ERA, and tied for third in wins. Verlander allowed just 26 hits in his 42 2/3 July innings and had a 0.891 WHIP. On September 27, Verlander struck out 12 Cleveland Indians batters, to give him a career-high eight games that season in which he totaled 10 or more strikeouts. Verlander was among the best starters in the majors after the 2016 All-Star Break. From July 15 on, Verlander compiled an 8–3 record, 1.96 ERA, 0.86 WHIP, and 134 strikeouts in 110 1/3 innings. In his three losses, the Tigers scored a total of two runs. On October 2, Verlander would also be the last pitcher to issue a four-pitch intentional walk (as the following season a rule change was implemented to have the manager simply signal to the umpire to issue one), intentionally walking Nick Markakis of the Atlanta Braves.

Verlander finished the 2016 season with a 16–9 record while recording 254 strikeouts to lead the American League for the fourth time in his career. He also finished first in the AL with a 1.00 WHIP, and his 3.04 ERA ranked second. His strikeout rate of 10.0 per 9 IP was the second-best of his career, trailing only the 10.1/9 rate posted in 2009. His 4.46 strikeout-to-walk ratio was a career-best and a Tiger record for a season, eclipsing the 4.44 mark set by Denny McLain in the 1968 season. Verlander joined Nolan Ryan and Roger Clemens as the only three American League pitchers in history to strike out 250 or more batters in a season after turning 33 years old. Verlander's 26 quality starts were tied for the AL lead (with former Tiger Rick Porcello). He threw 3,668 pitches, more than any other major league pitcher.

Following the season, Verlander was named a Gold Glove Award finalist at pitcher, along with R. A. Dickey and Dallas Keuchel. Verlander's five Defensive Runs Saved tied him for fourth among AL pitchers, as did his 29 assists. His 6.61 Wins Above Replacement (WAR) led all AL pitchers. Verlander won his third Tiger of the Year award, as awarded by the Detroit Chapter of the BBWAA.

Following the season, Verlander was announced by the BBWAA as a finalist for the American League Cy Young Award, along with Corey Kluber and former teammate Rick Porcello. Verlander finished second in Cy Young voting, losing to Porcello by five points, 132–137 in what was the second-closest vote in history (to the 2012 AL Cy Young race Verlander lost). Verlander received 14 first-place votes, to Porcello's eight first-place votes, but Verlander was left off two ballots. It marked the third time in history and first in the AL that a pitcher won the Cy Young Award without receiving the most first-place votes.

==== 2017 ====
In a win over the Chicago White Sox on April 4, 2017, Verlander tied a franchise record for the most strikeouts on Opening Day with ten, becoming the first Tigers player to do so since Mickey Lolich in 1970. In his 51st plate appearance in interleague play, Verlander recorded his first career run batted in (RBI) in an August 30 game against the Colorado Rockies, which was also his last game as a Tiger.

=== Houston Astros (2017–2022) ===
==== Rest of 2017: ALCS MVP, World Series championship ====
Seconds before the waiver trade deadline on August 31, the Tigers sent Verlander to the Houston Astros for prospects Franklin Pérez, Jake Rogers, and Daz Cameron. Verlander won his Astros debut on September 5 against the Seattle Mariners, giving up one run and striking out seven over six innings. He started and won the AL West division-clinching game for the Astros on September 17, allowing one run and striking out ten Mariners batters over seven innings. He won all five of his regular season starts with Houston, posting a 1.06 ERA and 0.65 WHIP in those games. The Astros chose to skip Verlander's final scheduled start on Sunday, October 1 and have him start the first game of the ALDS. He finished the 2017 regular season with a 15–8 record, 3.36 ERA, 1.175 WHIP, and 219 strikeouts in 206 innings. He threw 3,531 pitches, more than any other major league pitcher for the second consecutive year.

After a couple of injury-riddled seasons, many believed Verlander had lost the fastball velocity to which most fans had grown accustomed. However, his velocity soared back up to an average of 95.3 in his 2017 campaign, four miles per hour faster than his average in 2014 (91.2), and three miles per hour faster than his average in 2015 (92.3). He also hit triple digits on the radar gun in 2017 for the first time since his 2013 season.

Verlander won two games in the Astros' 3-games-to-1 ALDS triumph over the Boston Red Sox. He started and won Game 1, and picked up the second win with 2 2/3 innings of relief in the clinching Game 4. On October 14, he started Game 2 of the ALCS versus the Yankees, throwing a 13-strikeout, 2–1 complete game victory. The Astros won the game on a ninth-inning walk-off double by shortstop Carlos Correa that drove home second baseman Jose Altuve. With the Astros facing elimination in Game 6 of the ALCS, Verlander pitched seven shutout innings in a 7–1 victory over the Yankees. The Astros went on to defeat the Yankees in Game 7, allowing them to advance to the World Series for the second time in franchise history. During the ALCS, Verlander went 2–0, with a 0.56 ERA and 21 strikeouts in 16 innings pitched. Following his outstanding performance, he was named the ALCS MVP.

Verlander received a no-decision in Game 2 of the World Series against the Los Angeles Dodgers, the third time he participated in a World Series. He allowed only two hits in six innings, but both hits were home runs, and he left the game with the Astros trailing 3–1. The Astros eventually won the game 7–6 in 11 innings. With a chance to clinch the series in Game 6, Verlander gave up three hits and two runs while striking out nine batters in six innings, but was tagged with the loss in a 3–1 final. It was the first time in his career that Verlander failed to win a series-clinching game in the postseason, having gone 3–0 in his three previous chances. It was also his first loss as a member of the Astros. The Astros defeated the Dodgers the next night in Game 7, giving Verlander his first World Series championship.

For the 2017 postseason, Verlander made six appearances and five starts, being credited with a 4–1 record, and gaining a 2.21 ERA, .177 batting average against, eight walks, and 38 strikeouts in 36 2/3 innings. Along with Jose Altuve, Verlander was also named winner of the Babe Ruth Award as co-MVPs of the 2017 postseason.

==== 2018: 200 career wins, 2,500 strikeouts, Cy Young runner-up ====
On March 5, 2018, Verlander was named the opening day starter for the Astros. This was his 10th career opening day start and first with Houston. He started and won on March 29 versus Cole Hamels of the Texas Rangers, pitching six shutout innings and striking out five.

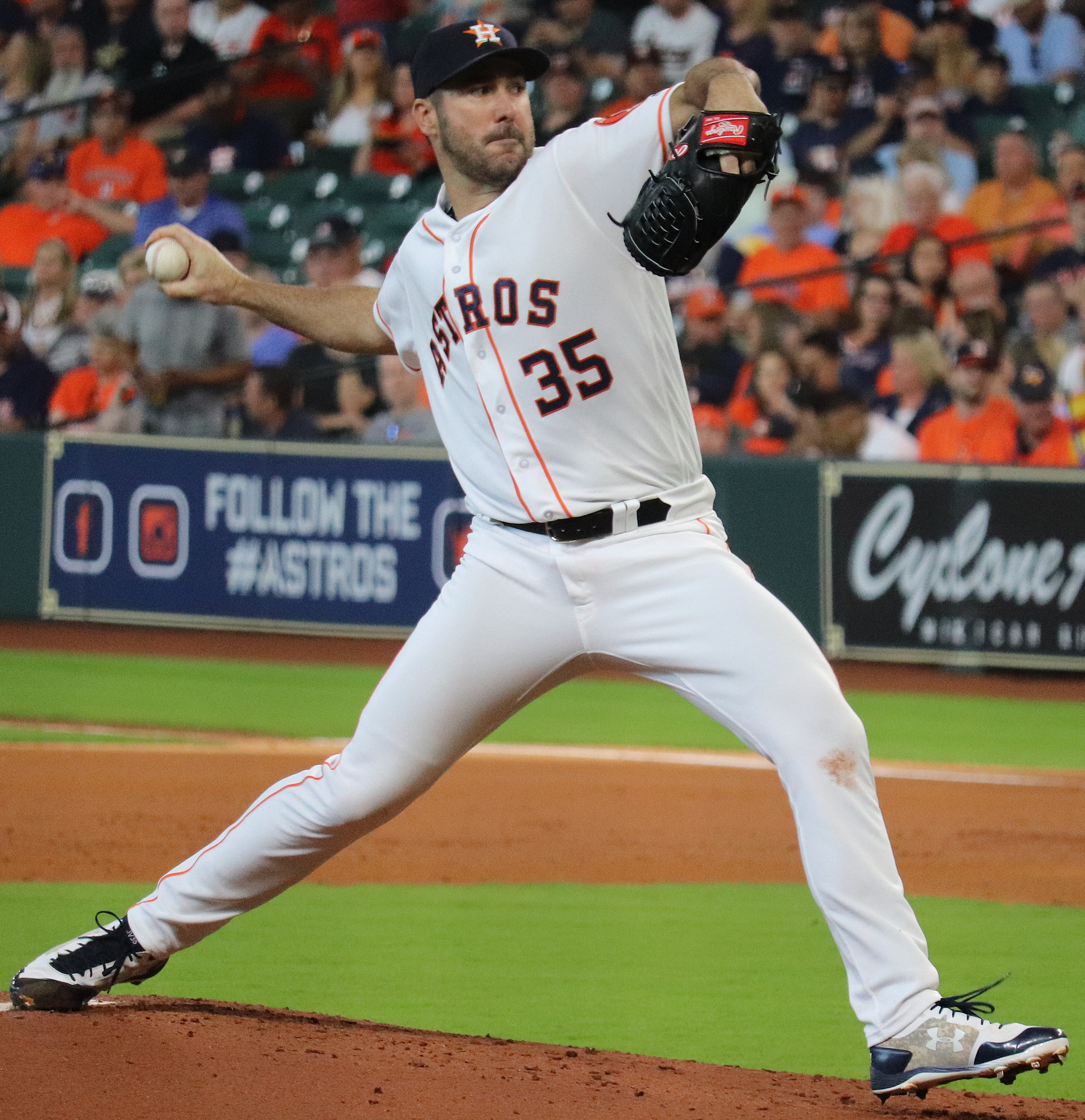
Verlander in April 2018

Unlike in previous seasons, Verlander started masterfully in 2018, leading an Astros rotation that began the season as the most dominant in the major leagues. In April, Verlander went 4–0 with a 1.36 ERA and 48 strikeouts over 40 innings. He was named the AL Player of the Week on April 17; in 15 innings over two starts that week, he struck out 20 and allowed a .100 opponents' batting average.

On May 1, Verlander struck out 14 Yankees, tying his career high, over eight shutout innings in Houston. On May 16, Verlander threw a complete-game shutout against the Los Angeles Angels for his eighth career shutout and 24th complete game. He struck out Shohei Ohtani in the top of the ninth inning for his 2,500th career strikeout, becoming the 33rd pitcher in Major League history to reach the milestone. He was second among active leaders in strikeouts behind CC Sabathia.

Twelve games into the 2018 season, Verlander led the AL in 17 different categories, most notably: ERA (1.11), Wins (7), Innings Pitched (81.1), WAR for pitchers (3.3), WHIP (0.713), H/9 Innings (4.8) and BAA (.153). Verlander was named AL Pitcher of the Month for May, his fifth such award. In six starts, he produced a 0.86 ERA and .437 OPS against, allowed nine extra-base hits, while striking out 50 over 41 2/3 innings. He started and ended the month by dominating the Yankees—the only lineup in baseball with an OPS over .800—with 20 strikeouts and only one run allowed in 14 2/3 innings.

On July 8, Verlander was named to his seventh All-Star Game, and his first with the Astros. However, Verlander made his scheduled start on the Sunday before the All-Star Game and did not pitch in the game, the third time that he missed the ASG for that reason.

On August 19, Verlander went 5 1/3 innings striking out six and giving up four earned runs in a 9–4 victory over the Oakland Athletics, lifting the Astros into first place and dropping the A's into second. The win was Verlander's 200th career win, becoming the 114th pitcher (and third active pitcher) to reach the milestone, and only the 20th pitcher in Major League history to do so in 412 starts or fewer.

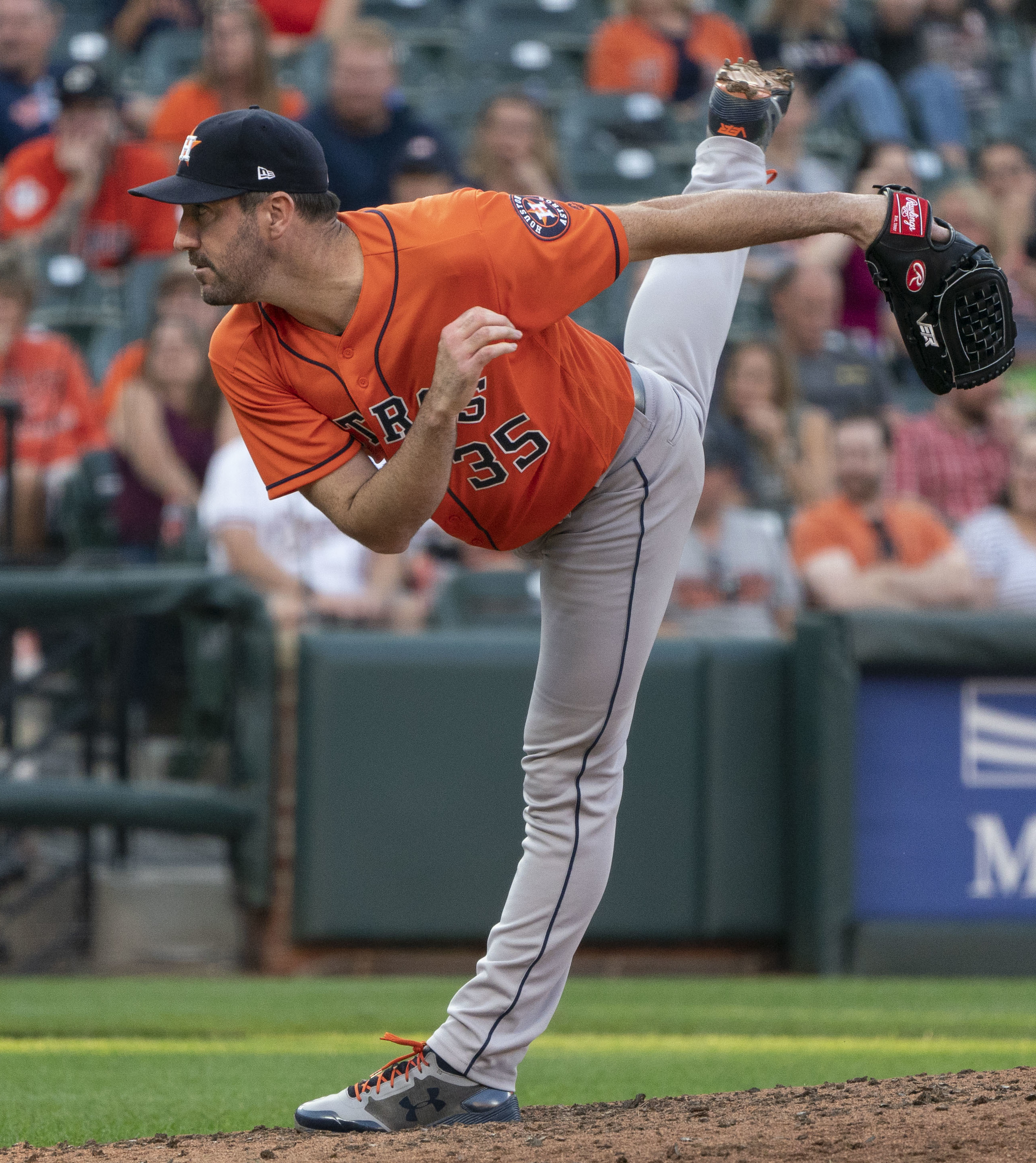
Verlander with the Astros in 2018

On September 10, in his first start in Detroit since being traded, Verlander got the win while allowing two runs on six hits in seven innings pitched. He struck out 10 Tigers batters, giving him 258 strikeouts this season. Verlander and Gerrit Cole became the first teammates to strike out at least 250 batters in the same season since Randy Johnson and Curt Schilling in 2002. Verlander was given many standing ovations during his outing, and Comerica Park played a tribute video showing highlights of his 13 seasons as a Tiger. Verlander tied his career high of 269 strikeouts in a season with an 11-strikeout performance in a 5–4 victory over the Arizona Diamondbacks on September 16. Verlander subsequently set a new career high the next game in a 10–5 victory over the Los Angeles Angels on September 22. Verlander struck out 11 in six innings while only giving up one hit, stretching his career-high to 280 strikeouts. Verlander also helped set a new Major League record for the Astros with their 1,069th strikeout by their starters in a season, breaking the mark set by the Cleveland Indians in 2017.

Verlander finished the 2018 season with a 16–9 record in 214 innings pitched and posted a 2.52 ERA with a career-high 290 strikeouts. He posted his lowest ERA since his American League MVP and Cy Young Award-winning 2011 season and led the AL in strikeouts for the fifth time in his career. Verlander also led the major leagues with a 0.902 WHIP and a 7.84 strikeouts-to-walks ratio. His 1.6-per-9 IP walk rate was the lowest of his career. He had the highest fly ball percentage among major league pitchers (51.4%). He finished the season with four straight games in which he struck out 10+ batters, giving him a career-best 13 games this season with double-digit strikeouts.

In Game 1 of the ALDS, Verlander earned the win, allowing two runs in 5 1/3 innings and striking out seven against the Cleveland Indians. The Astros earned a three-game sweep over the Indians and moved on to face the Boston Red Sox in the American League Championship Series. Verlander started and won Game 1 of the ALCS in Fenway Park, allowing two runs and two hits in six innings pitched. Verlander lost Game 5 of the ALCS with his team down three games to one, surrendering four runs in six innings. It marked the first time in his career that he lost a postseason elimination game.

In the 2018 AL Cy Young Award voting announced on November 14, Verlander finished second to Blake Snell of the Tampa Bay Rays by 15 points (169–154). Verlander received 13 first-place votes to Snell's 17. This was Verlander's third Cy Young runner-up finish, and sixth time finishing in the top five.

==== 2019: Third no-hitter, 3,000 strikeouts, second Cy Young award, and World Series ====
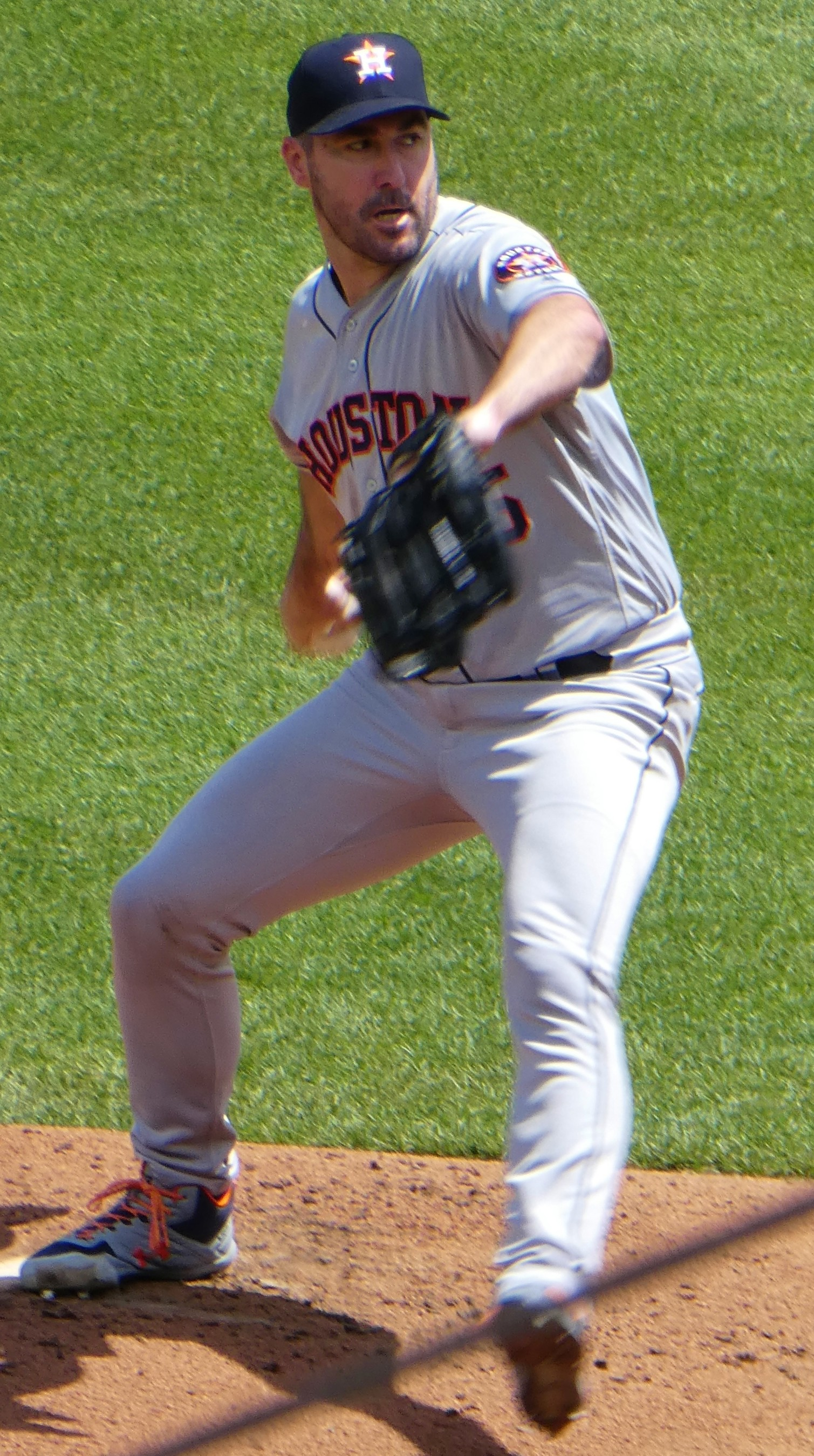
Verlander with the Astros in 2019

On March 24, 2019, Verlander and the Astros agreed on a two-year, $66 million contract extension to keep Verlander with Houston through the 2021 season. Verlander made his 11th career Opening Day start on March 28, earning a 5–1 victory versus reigning Cy Young Award winner Blake Snell and the Tampa Bay Rays.

On June 1, Verlander threw eight innings of one-run ball with eight strikeouts, passing Cy Young on the all-time MLB strikeouts list, and finished the night with 2,809 career strikeouts. He struck out seven in his next outing against the Seattle Mariners on June 6 to move into the top 20 on the all-time strikeouts list, surpassing Mike Mussina's total of 2,813. In the June 12 contest versus the Milwaukee Brewers Verlander struck out a career-high fifteen batters, fourteen of them swinging, over seven innings. On June 18, Verlander struck out eight Cincinnati Reds batters to move past Mickey Lolich for 19th place on the all-time strikeouts list.

Verlander was named to the American League All-Star team for the eighth time in his career. At the time of the selection, Verlander had a 10–3 record, 2.86 ERA, 147 strikeouts, and an MLB-leading 0.794 WHIP. Verlander was selected as the starting pitcher for the All-Star game for the second time in his career on July 9. He pitched one inning and retired all three batters he faced, two on strikeouts.

Verlander surpassed 200 strikeouts for the season on August 4, for the ninth time in his career. He joined Nolan Ryan, Randy Johnson, Roger Clemens, Tom Seaver, Pedro Martinez, and Bob Gibson as the only pitchers with nine or more seasons of 200+ strikeouts.

On August 21, Verlander lost to the Detroit Tigers, 2–1, despite allowing no walks and only two hits, both of them solo home runs, over nine innings. He is the only pitcher other than Mike Mussina in 1998 known to have pitched a complete game loss without ever throwing a pitch with a runner on base. Verlander also had 11 strikeouts in the game, the seventh straight game in which he recorded double-digit strikeouts.

On September 1, in a road game against the Toronto Blue Jays, Verlander threw his third career no-hitter. He allowed one base-runner, a walk to Cavan Biggio in the first inning, and struck out 14 batters in the 2–0 victory. The Astros' only runs came on a two-run home run by Abraham Toro in the top of the ninth inning. This was Verlander's second career no-hitter against the Blue Jays, making him just the third pitcher of the modern era to no-hit the same team twice, and the first to pitch both no-hitters against the same team on the road. He also became the sixth pitcher ever to throw three or more no-hitters. He continued his dominance into his next start, setting an Astros franchise record on September 7 for consecutive batters retired in a row, at 32. Teammate Ryan Pressly tied this record in 2022.

On September 28, in his final start of the 2019 regular season, Verlander struck out Kole Calhoun in the bottom of the 4th inning against the Los Angeles Angels for his 3,000th career strikeout, becoming the 18th pitcher in history to reach that milestone. Verlander struck Calhoun out again in the bottom of the 6th for his 300th strikeout of the season, a new career-high, becoming the second player in Major League history after Randy Johnson to achieve his first 300 strikeout season in the same game as recording his 3,000th career strikeout. Verlander and teammate Gerrit Cole became the first pair of starting pitchers to strike out 300+ hitters in the same season since Randy Johnson and Curt Schilling achieved the feat in 2002 for the Arizona Diamondbacks.

Verlander finished the 2019 season 21–6 with 300 strikeouts and a 2.58 ERA in 223 innings pitched. He finished first in MLB in innings pitched and games started for the fourth time in his career, first in wins for the third time in his career, and first in WHIP for the third time in his career. His 0.803 WHIP was the lowest in a major league season since Pedro Martínez posted a 0.737 WHIP in 2000. Verlander also led the American League with a 7.14 strikeouts-to-walks ratio. He was also first in MLB in WAR for pitchers (7.8) and lowest hits per nine innings (5.529). Batters hit .171 against him, the lowest average in the major leagues, and his left on-base percentage of 88.4% was also best in the majors. He allowed the highest fly ball percentage of all major league pitchers (45.2%), which contributed to a career-high 36 home runs allowed.

During the top of the second inning of game 2 of the 2019 World Series, Verlander recorded the 200th postseason strikeout of his career, setting a new major league record, surpassing the previous record of 199 set by John Smoltz. He finished the game with six strikeouts, seven hits and four earned runs in six innings in a 12–3 loss to the Washington Nationals. With the loss, he became the first pitcher in major league history to lose his first five World Series decisions.

On November 12, 2019, Verlander won his second Cy Young Award, receiving 171 points and 17 of 30 first-place votes to top teammate Gerrit Cole (159 points, 13 first-place votes). It was also the first time he received the award while playing for the Houston Astros.

==== 2020–2021: Elbow surgery and recovery ====
On March 17, 2020, Verlander underwent surgery on his right groin that required six weeks to recover. At around the same time, the season was delayed due to the COVID-19 pandemic.

Verlander made his 12th career opening day start in the 2020 Covid-delayed season on July 24, earning the win after striking out seven and giving up two runs through six innings. This was the Astros' eighth straight win on Opening Day, having won every Opening Day game since their move to the AL West in 2013. On July 26, 2020, it was reported that Verlander would be shut down with a forearm strain. On September 19, Verlander confirmed via his Instagram account that he would undergo Tommy John surgery and would miss the remainder of the 2020 season plus all of the 2021 season, which kept him sidelined through the end of his contract extension with the Astros. Verlander underwent the procedure on September 30, 2020.

On February 27, 2021, the Astros placed Verlander on the 60-day injured list as he continued to recover from Tommy John surgery. He missed the entire 2021 season.

On December 13, 2021, Verlander signed a one-year contract with the Astros, containing an option for a second season.

==== 2022: Comeback, third Cy Young, and second World Series Championship ====
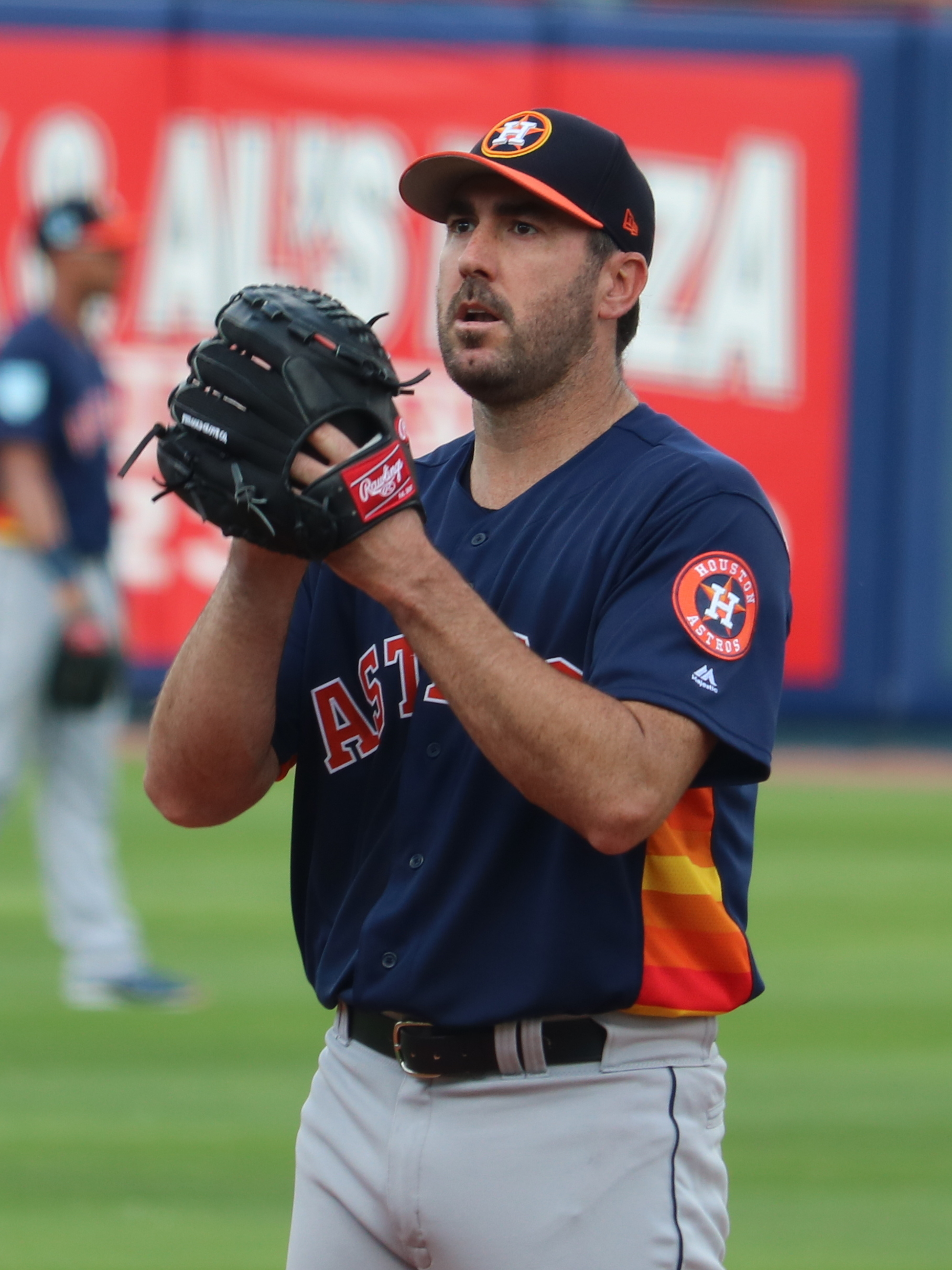
Verlander with the Astros in 2019

Having not recorded a statistic in 2021, Verlander made his way back on April 9, 2022, against the Los Angeles Angels, for the first time since Opening Day 2020. Verlander struck out seven and allowed one run over five innings in a 2–0 loss. On April 16, Verlander threw eight scoreless innings against the Seattle Mariners in a 4–0 victory, striking out eight batters. He pitched his 3,000th career inning in the seventh, becoming the 138th pitcher in Major League Baseball history to do so (only he and Zack Greinke had pitched 3,000 innings among then-active players). On May 10 against the Minnesota Twins, Verlander took a no-hitter through seven innings until Gio Urshela ended the chance in the eighth inning. Verlander finished the game with eight innings pitched and five strikeouts, allowing the one hit for a game score of 83 and lowering his ERA to 1.55 on the season.

On June 1, Verlander took a no-hitter into the seventh inning versus the Oakland Athletics until Elvis Andrus hit an RBI double. On June 7, Verlander became the career active strikeout leader, passing Max Scherzer, after striking out twelve hitters over seven innings in a 4–1 victory over the Mariners. Verlander also passed John Smoltz on the all-time strikeout list, moving up to 17th with his 3,085th strikeout.

Verlander earned his ninth career selection to the All-Star Game. He struck out ten over six innings in a 5–0 win over the A's on July 16, amounting to 3,121 career strikeouts, and moving him past Curt Schilling (3,116) and Bob Gibson (3,117) for 14th place all time. As of the All-Star break, Verlander was 12–3, with a 1.89 ERA, a 0.878 WHIP and 108 strikeouts. Per STATS, LLC, he became the first pitcher in history to have reached or exceeded each of the following as of an All-Star break: 2.00 ERA, 12 wins, .800 winning percentage, .200 batting average against, 0.900 WHIP, and a strikeout-to-walk ratio of 5.00. On July 29, he allowed one run in 7 2/3 innings in an 11–1 defeat of the Mariners. The 240th win of Verlander's career, it moved him into a tie with Frank Tanana for 56th all-time. On August 4, Verlander reached 130 innings to actuate the player option for the 2023 season.

On August 23, 2022, Verlander threw six hitless innings and struck out ten batters in a 4–2 win against the Minnesota Twins. In doing so, Verlander passed Pedro Martínez on the all-time strikeout list and overtook Scherzer again as the active career leader in strikeouts. Verlander left a start versus Baltimore after three innings on August 28 due to sudden right calf discomfort and was placed on the 15-day IL for what an MRI revealed to be a mild rupture of the muscle fascia. In his return to the mound on September 16, Verlander hurled five hitless innings against the Athletics to lead the Astros to a 5–0 victory and secure a sixth consecutive postseason berth. He walked one and struck out nine to extend their winning streak to six games.

In his final start of the regular season on October 4, Verlander authored a 10-strikeout, no-hit performance over five innings as Houston cruised to a 10–0 win over the Philadelphia Phillies. He passed Ferguson Jenkins and Scherzer again for 12th place on the all-time strikeout list and tied Jim Deshaies (1986) for an Astros franchise record of eight consecutive strikeouts in the game.

Verlander concluded his 2022 campaign with an 18–4 record, 1.75 ERA, and 185 strikeouts in 175 innings pitched. In twelve starts that followed an Astro loss, Verlander went 9–0 with a 1.11 ERA. He led all the Major Leagues in ERA, WHIP (0.829), and BAA (.186) while leading the American League in wins. He won his first ERA title since his 2011 MVP campaign while setting a career-best, and posted the lowest qualifying ERA over a non-shortened season in the AL (excluding 2020) since Pedro Martinez's 1.74 mark in 2000. (Note: Verlander's 1.75 ERA trailed only Nolan Ryan, who, with a 1.69 ERA, won the NL ERA title during the strike-shortened 1981 season for best in club history overall, and thereby rating as best-ever in an unshortened 162-game season.) His ERA was also the lowest achieved in history for a pitcher over the age of 39 making at least 25 starts.

Following the regular season, the Houston chapter of the BBWAA recognized Verlander as the Houston Astros' Pitcher of the Year, the third time he had won the award, and third in three full seasons with the club. He was selected for a third Players Choice Award for AL Outstanding Pitcher, and first for AL Comeback Player.

In Game 1 of the 2022 ALCS, Verlander struck out eleven over six innings in a 4–2 win versus the New York Yankees. His eighth double-digit strikeout effort in the postseason, it set a major league record. Starting in the third inning, he struck out a postseason record-tying six consecutive hitters, repeating an achievement of his in Game 3 of the 2013 ALCS. Verlander allowed five earned runs in Game 1 of the 2022 World Series, giving him a career 6.07 ERA in World Series games, the highest among pitchers with a minimum of 30 innings pitched in the World Series. Later in Game 5 of the series, Verlander allowed one earned run over five innings pitched and also striking out six. The Astros would end up winning 3–2, giving Verlander his first career World Series win and 16th postseason win (2nd most in MLB history after passing John Smoltz); he had eight previous World Series starts without winning, posting an 0–6 record before that night, the worst record for any pitcher before winning his first World Series game. The Astros would go on to defeat the Phillies in six games, giving Verlander his second World Series ring.

On November 10, Verlander opted out of his player option with the Astros and became a free agent. He was awarded the Cy Young by unanimous vote on November 16, becoming the 11th pitcher in MLB history to win three Cy Young Awards. It was the second time Verlander was a unanimous choice for the award (receiving every possible first-place vote).

=== New York Mets (2023) ===
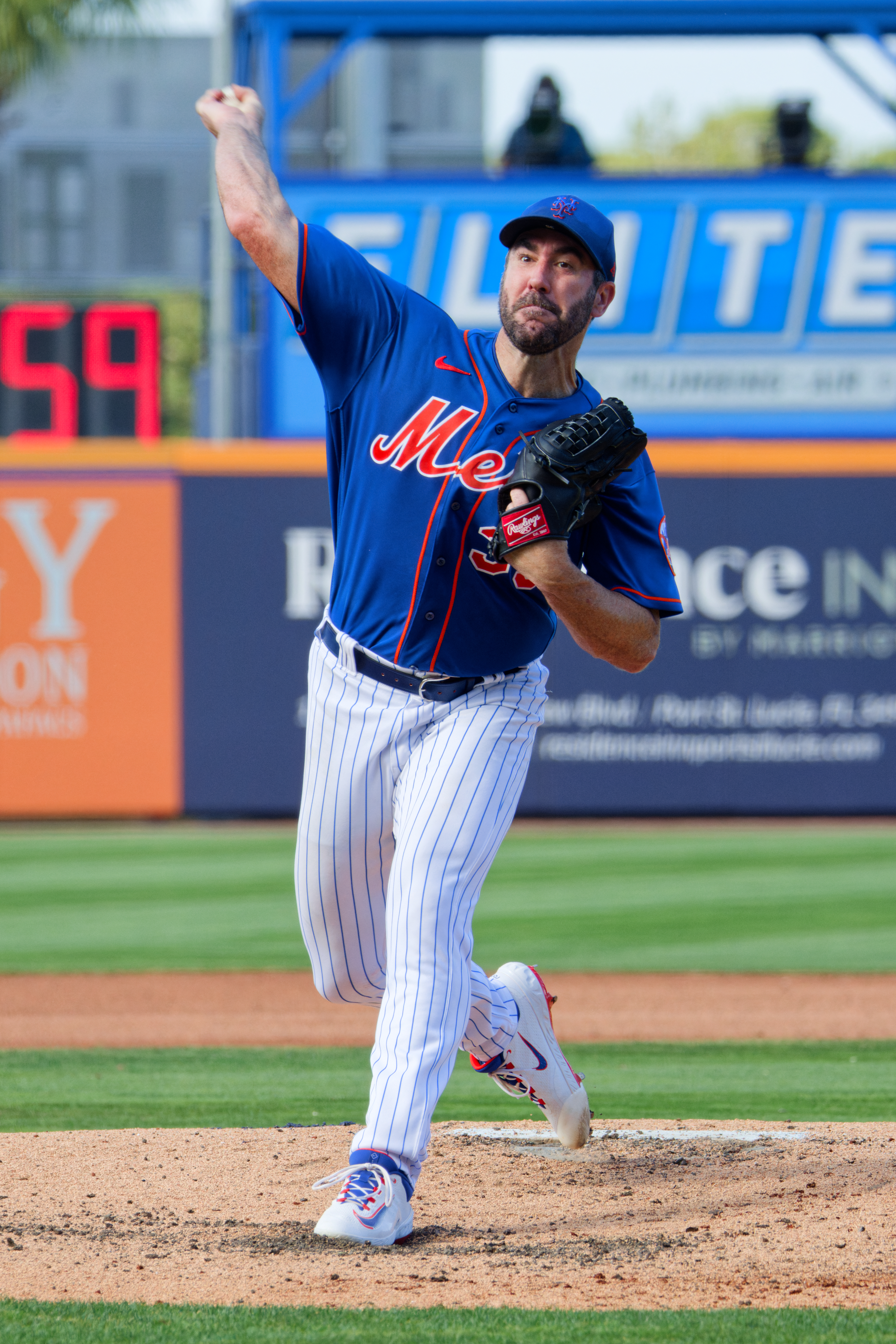
Verlander with the Mets in 2023

On December 7, 2022, Verlander signed a two-year, $86.7 million contract with the New York Mets, with a $35 million vesting option for 2025. At a $43.3 million average annual value, the contract matched the record for highest AAV in MLB history with teammate Max Scherzer's contract signed during the 2021–22 offseason. On March 30, 2023, the Mets announced that they placed Verlander on 15-day injured list with a low-grade teres major strain. The move was retroactive to March 28.

On May 4, the Mets activated Verlander from the IL and made his 2023 debut against his former team, the Detroit Tigers. On May 10, Verlander struck out seven hitters over seven innings in a 2–1 victory over the Cincinnati Reds. With the win, Verlander became the 21st pitcher in MLB history to defeat all 30 teams.

On July 30, Verlander earned his 250th career win, the 49th pitcher to do so, in the Mets' 5–2 victory over the Washington Nationals, allowing one run in 5^{1}/_{3} innings in his final start as a Met. Across 16 games for the Mets, he posted a 6–5 record, a 3.15 ERA, and 81 strikeouts across 94^{1}/_{3} innings pitched.

=== Houston Astros (2023–2024) ===
==== 2023 ====
On August 1, 2023, the Mets traded Verlander to the Houston Astros for outfield prospects Drew Gilbert, Ryan Clifford, and cash considerations. Verlander's first start of the season at Minute Maid Park, August 11 versus the Los Angeles Angels, was the 500th start of his career. He became the 50th pitcher in history, joining former Astros teammate Zack Greinke as the only active pitchers to reach the total. On August 27, Verlander earned his 100th career win at Comerica Park against the Detroit Tigers, becoming the 36th pitcher to win as many games in a single stadium. He faced longtime Tigers teammate Miguel Cabrera for the final time, as Cabrera would retire following the season.

On September 25, Verlander threw eight innings while only giving up one run and striking out eight batters in a 5–1 win over the Seattle Mariners and stabilized an Astros team that was coming out of a 3–9 stretch that included series losses to the 100-loss Oakland Athletics and Kansas City Royals. On September 30, Verlander threw 5 innings of shutout ball against the Arizona Diamondbacks in a tight 1–0 victory to help the Astros clinch a playoff berth for the seventh consecutive season. Verlander struck out five batters in the game, tying him with Phil Niekro for 12th on the all-time strikeout list with 3,342. It was also the fourth time that the Astros clinched a postseason berth in a Verlander start since he was traded to the team in 2017. For his efforts, Verlander was awarded his 10th career AL Player of the Week award for the week of September 25 to October 1, posting a 2–0 record with a 0.69 ERA and 13 strikeouts over 13 IP. Since the award was established in 1973, Verlander became the fourth pitcher to win as many as 10 times. (Note: Nolan Ryan (13), Roger Clemens (11), and Randy Johnson (10) were the first three pitchers to be named Player of the Week 10 or more times and each pitched for the Astros.)

Verlander made his 35th career postseason start in Game 1 of the ALDS, the second most of all-time behind Andy Pettitte, throwing six shutout innings and helping lead the Astros to a 6–4 victory. It was the 6th scoreless postseason start of Verlander's career, tying him for most all-time with Madison Bumgarner and Tom Glavine.

==== 2024 ====
Verlander started the 2024 season on the 15-day injured list after experiencing complications with shoulder inflammation during spring training. He made his season debut on April 19, throwing six innings of two-run ball to help the Astros get a 5–3 win over the Washington Nationals. Verlander also passed Phil Niekro for 12th on the all-time strikeout list with his 3,343rd career strikeout.

On May 25, 2024, Verlander struck out Abraham Toro for his 3,372nd career strikeout, passing Greg Maddux for 10th on the all-time strikeout list en route to a 6–3 victory over the Oakland Athletics. The victory was also the 260th of Verlander's career, the most of any pitcher who debuted in the 21st century. However, on June 19, he was placed on the 15-day IL due to shoulder inflammation.

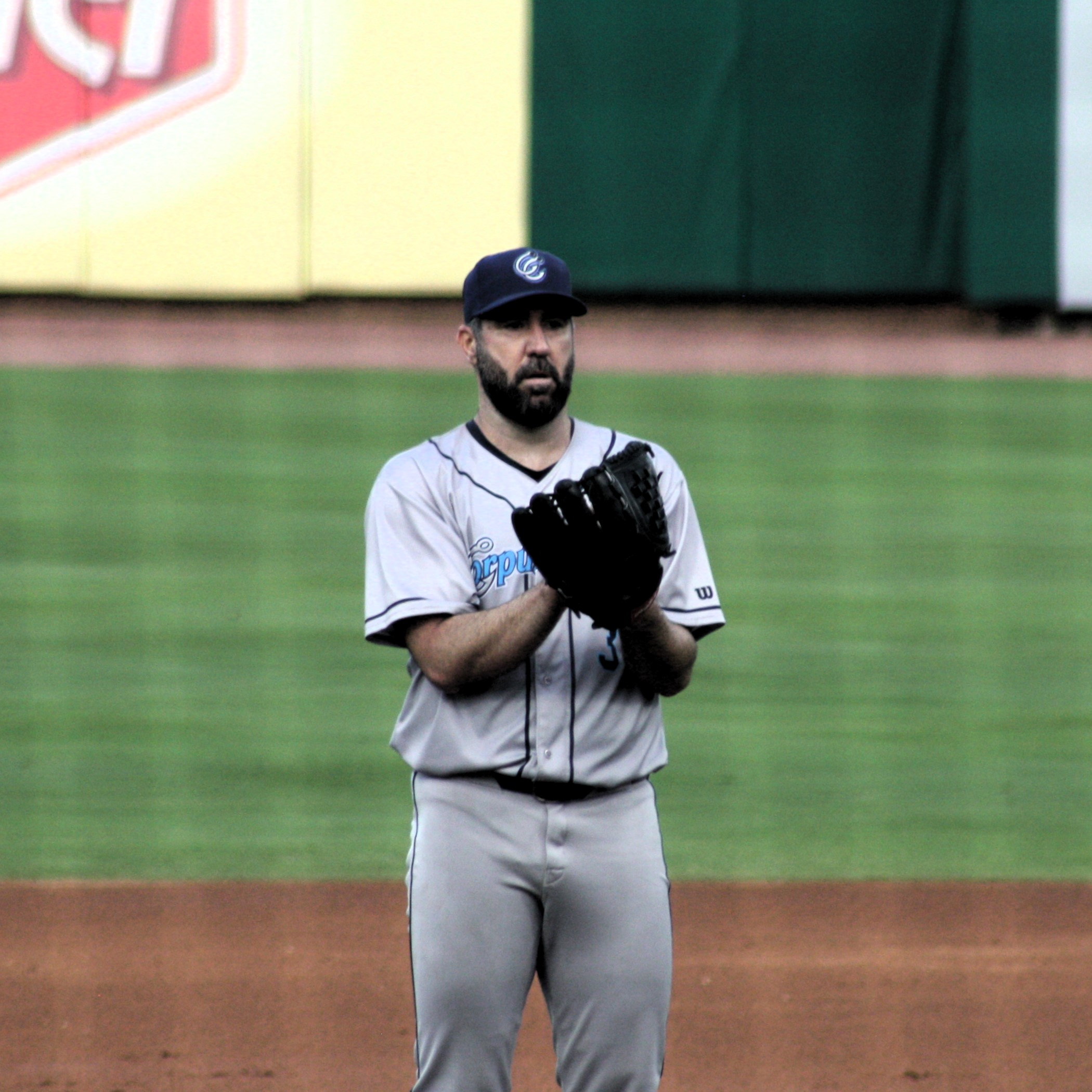
Justin Verlander made a rehab appearance for the Double-A Corpus Christi Hooks at Arvest Ballpark.

On August 21, Verlander made his return from the IL at home, a 4–1 loss to the Boston Red Sox, allowing two runs over five innings and struck out six. In 17 total starts for the Astros, he compiled a 5–6 record and 5.48 ERA with 74 strikeouts across 90 1/3 innings pitched. Following the season, Verlander became a free agent.

=== San Francisco Giants (2025) ===
On January 11, 2025, Verlander signed a one-year, $15 million contract with the San Francisco Giants.

On March 29 at Great American Ball Park, Verlander made his Giants debut. Facing the Cincinnati Reds at Great American Ball Park, he pitched five innings, giving up six hits, allowing two runs, and walking only one batter while striking out five. However, the Reds scored the last run in the sixth inning off of San Francisco's bullpen, defeating the Giants, 3–2, and leaving Verlander with a no decision.

Verlander made his San Francisco debut on April 4 at Oracle Park, in the Giants' home opener. Facing the Seattle Mariners, he pitched 2 1/3 innings, giving up five hits and walking two while striking out two. The Giants won the game after Willy Adames hit a game-winning two-run single with two outs in the bottom of the eleventh inning, defeating the Mariners, 10–9 in extra innings, and leaving Verlander with his second no decision of the season.

Verlander was placed on the 15-day IL due to a right pectoral injury after the Giants' 8-4 loss to the Kansas City Royals on May 21.

On August 10 against the Washington Nationals, Verlander recorded his 3,500th career strikeout when he struck out Nathaniel Lowe in the first inning. Verlander became the 10th pitcher in Major League history to record 3,500 career strikeouts and the eighth right-handed pitcher to achieve that milestone. On August 26, Verlander struck out Kyle Tucker for his 3,516th career strikeout, passing Walter Johnson for 9th on the all-time strikeout list, en route to a 5–2 victory over the Chicago Cubs. On August 31 against the Baltimore Orioles, Verlander pitched five innings and struck out 10 batters, making him the oldest pitcher (42 years, 192 days) with 10+ strikeouts in a game since Randy Johnson on August 22, 2008 (44 years, 347 days). The only other pitchers with at least one 10-K game at that age or older in at least the last 125 seasons are Roger Clemens, Nolan Ryan, and Gaylord Perry. On September 6, Verlander struck out Nolan Gorman for 3,535th career strikeout, passing Gaylord Perry for 8th on the all-time strikeout list, in a 3-2 loss against the St. Louis Cardinals. In 29 total starts for the Giants, he compiled a 4–11 record and 3.85 ERA with 137 strikeouts across 152 innings pitched.

=== Detroit Tigers (2026) ===
On February 10, 2026, Verlander signed a one-year, $13 million contract to return to the Tigers, with "... a $2 million base salary and $11 million in deferred payments starting in 2030." On April 4, Verlander was placed on the 15-day injured list due to left hip inflammation. He was transferred to the 60-day injured list on May 10. The Tigers planned to activate Verlander on June 21, but a strained left hamstring resulted in an extension of his stint on the injured list.

On July 8, Verlander was named an All-Star for the tenth time in his career, having been selected as a Legend Pick by Commissioner of Baseball Rob Manfred. Shortly after, Verlander announced on social media that he would be retiring at season's end.

Verlander returned to the Tigers to pitch in his last MLB game on September 26 against the Pittsburgh Pirates. He pitched 5 1/3 innings, allowing two runs on five hits with six strikeouts while throwing 91 pitches. He got a no-decision, as the Tigers won the game in the ninth inning on a walk-off home run by Eduardo Valencia. Verlander's daughter threw out the ceremonial first pitch the night before. Along with manager AJ Hinch, she came out for his final mound visit.

== International career ==
As a college sophomore, Verlander pitched for the United States national baseball team in 2003 and helped the US win a silver medal in the Pan American Games in Santo Domingo.

Verlander was invited to join the United States national team at the 2023 World Baseball Classic, but he declined, citing his recent recovery from Tommy John surgery and World Series campaign.

== Pitching style ==
Verlander threw four pitches: a hard four-seam fastball averaging 94–95 mph (topping out at 102), a slider in the mid-to-high 80s, a 12–6 curveball around 80, and a changeup at 85–88 mph. He was known for his unusual ability to "add" and "subtract" from his fastball velocity at any point in the game, giving him the ability to throw it in the upper 90s even in the late innings of games. From 2008 onward, Verlander threw pitches of over 100+ mph in the 8th inning or later 44 times, 39 more times than James Paxton, who is second on the list. This despite the fact that he threw the most pitches in the major leagues since the beginning of the 2008 season. After a couple of injury-prone seasons, many believed Verlander had lost the velocity most fans had grown accustomed to. However, Verlander's velocity soared back up to an average of 95.3 in his 2017 campaign, 4 miles per hour faster than his average in 2014 (91.2), and three miles per hour faster than his average in 2015 (92.3). Verlander's average fastball velocity with no strikes was 94.7 mph, while with two strikes it was 97.0 mph.

Due to the changing nature of how pitchers are used in baseball, Verlander was considered by some to be the last of the old-school power pitchers. He was also considered to be a higher-than-average fly ball pitcher. Throughout his career, Verlander was consistently near or at the top of the league in innings pitched, leading the league in 2009, 2011, 2012, and 2019. He finished in the Top 10 in innings pitched 9 times (2009–13, 2016–19) and had the most 200+ innings pitched seasons of any contemporary pitcher with 11. His power pitching frequently led to high strikeout totals. He was a five-time American League strikeout champion (2009, 2011, 2012, 2016, and 2018), and led all of major league baseball in three of those five seasons (2009, 2011, and 2012). He fanned 3,560 batters in his career, one of only 11 pitchers in history to reach the 3,500 mark, and ranks eighth all-time in career strikeouts.

== Charity work ==
In 2013, Verlander formed the Wins for Warriors Foundation for veterans of the United States Military. At that time, he donated over $1 million to the organization. For his work with military veterans, Verlander was honored as one of the inaugural recipients of the Bob Feller Act of Valor Award in 2013.

== Personal life ==
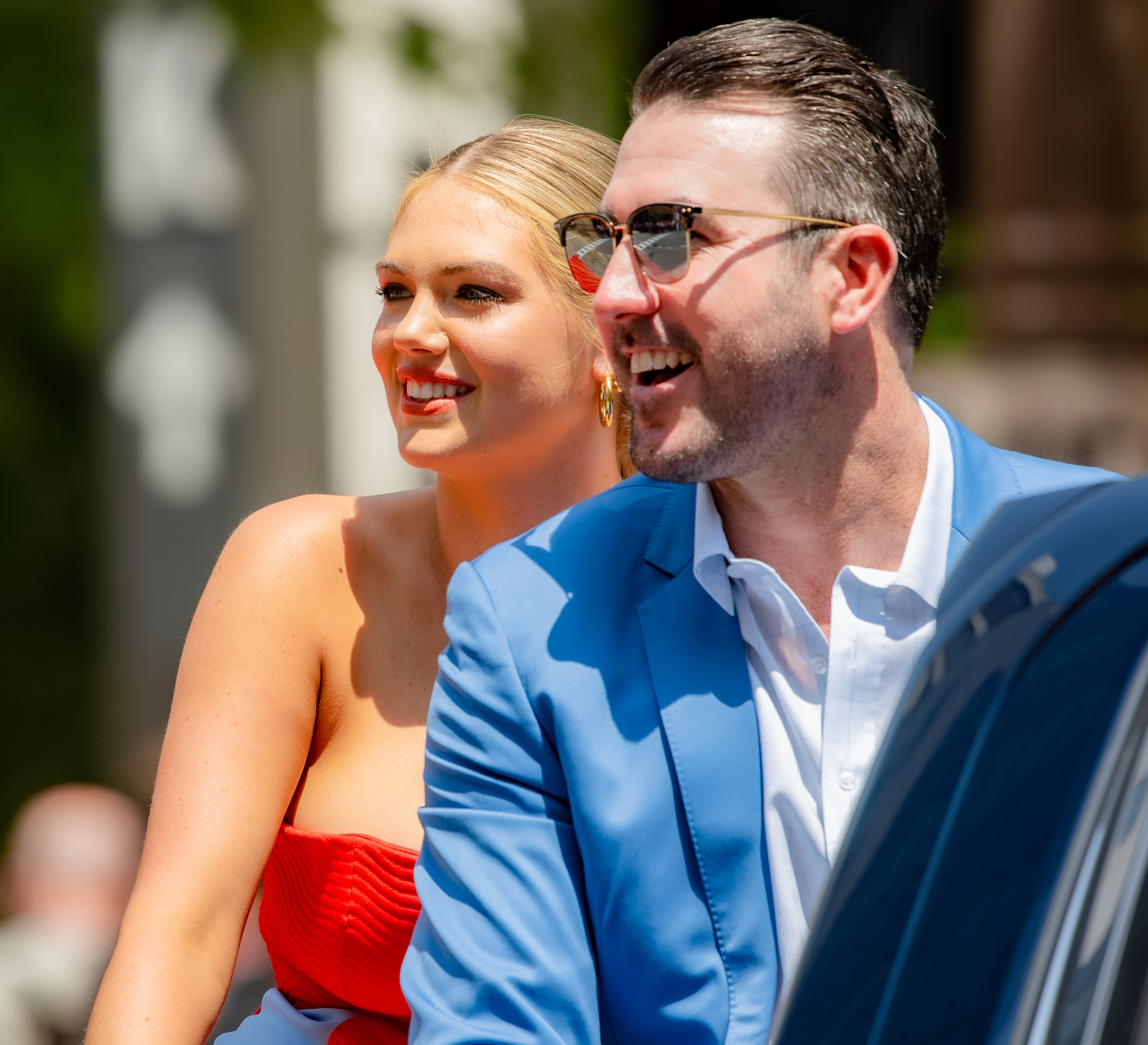
Verlander with wife Kate Upton in 2019

Verlander grew up in Manakin-Sabot, Virginia, with his parents, Richard and Kathy Verlander and a younger brother, Ben Verlander. His life experiences and the story of his development are outlined in his parents' 2012 book, Rocks Across the Pond: Lessons Learned, Stories Told.

His younger brother, Ben, played for the Tigers organization as an outfielder.

Verlander started dating model-actress Kate Upton in early 2014, and in 2016 the couple got engaged. In the 2014 iCloud leaks of celebrity photos, many of Verlander's personal pictures—including nude pictures of both himself and Upton, as well as other women—were leaked online. On November 4, 2017, two days after he won the World Series with the Astros, the two married in a medieval church in Tuscany, Italy, overlooking the Montalcino valley. On July 14, 2018, they announced that Upton was pregnant with their first child, a daughter. On June 19, 2025, they had their second child, a son.

== Awards and accolades ==
- 2× World Series champion (2017, 2022)
- American League Championship Series Most Valuable Player (ALCS MVP) (2017)
- American League Most Valuable Player (AL MVP) (2011)
- 3× Cy Young Award (2011—unanimous choice, 2019, 2022)
- 5× American League Pitcher of the Month (May 2009, June 2011, September 2012, July 2016, May 2018)
- 10× American League Player of the Week (May 22–28, 2006; June 11–17, 2007; May 2–8, 2011; June 13–19, 2011; September 12–18, 2011; September 24–30, 2012; April 9–15, 2018; September 10–16, 2018; August 26 – September 1, 2019; September 25 – October 1, 2023)
- American League Rookie of the Month (May 2006)
- American League Rookie of the Year (2006)
- Babe Ruth Award (2017) (Note: Co-winner with teammate Jose Altuve.)
- Detroit Sports Media Association Detroit Tigers Rookie of the Year Award (2006)
- 3× Houston Astros Pitcher of the Year (2018, 2019, 2022)
- 9× Major League Baseball All-Star (2007, 2009–2013, 2018, 2019, 2022)
- 3× Players Choice Award for AL Outstanding Pitcher (2011, 2019, 2022)
- Players Choice Award for AL Outstanding Rookie (2006)
- Players Choice Award for Player of the Year (2011)
- Players Choice Award for AL Comeback Player of the Year (2022)
- 3× Tiger of the Year-BBWAA-Detroit Chapter (2009, 2011, 2016)
- American League Pitching Triple Crown (2011)
- 7th in 2006 American League Cy Young Award voting (the highest of any rookie pitcher)
- 5th in 2007 American League Cy Young Award voting
- 15th in 2006 American League MVP voting (the highest of any rookie and second highest of any pitcher – Johan Santana was 7th)
- Became first Tigers pitcher since Denny McLain in 1968 (31–6, .838) to lead the American League in winning percentage and qualify for an ERA title (18–6, .750) in 2007. He did it again in 2011 (24–5, .828).
- Only pitcher in Major League history to win Rookie of the Year, start in a World Series game, throw a no-hitter, and be an All-Star in his first two seasons
- One of only two players to win the Rookie of the Year Award, Cy Young Award, and the MVP Award; the other is Don Newcombe
- Major League Baseball 2K12 cover athlete
- Third in 2009 American League Cy Young Award voting
- 2012 AL Cy Young Award runner-up
- 2016 AL Cy Young Award runner-up
- 2018 AL Cy Young Award runner-up

== See also ==
- Detroit Tigers award winners and league leaders • No-hitters • Team records
- Houston Astros award winners and league leaders • No-hitters • Team records
- List of Major League Baseball annual ERA leaders
- List of Major League Baseball annual strikeout leaders
- List of Major League Baseball annual wins leaders
- List of Major League Baseball career batters faced leaders
- List of Major League Baseball career games started leaders
- List of Major League Baseball career innings pitched leaders
- List of Major League Baseball career strikeout leaders
- List of Major League Baseball career WHIP leaders
- List of Major League Baseball career wins leaders
- List of Major League Baseball no-hitters
- List of Old Dominion University alumni
- Major League Baseball titles leaders
- Major League Baseball Triple Crown
- List of World Series starting pitchers

== Notes ==
Awards and achievements
Preceded by Jeremy Bonderman; David Price	Detroit Tigers Opening Day; Starting pitcher 2008–2014; 2016–2017	Succeeded by David Price; Jordan Zimmermann
Preceded by Dallas Keuchel	Houston Astros Opening Day; Starting pitcher 2018–2020	Succeeded by Zack Greinke
Preceded by Mark Buehrle; Francisco Liriano; Sanchez, Harris, Biagini & Devenski	No-hitter pitcher June 12, 2007; May 7, 2011; September 1, 2019	Succeeded by Clay Buchholz; Ervin Santana; Lucas Giolito
Preceded by Zack Greinke; Jeremy Hellickson; Félix Hernández; Danny Salazar; Sean Manaea	American League Pitcher of the Month; May 2009; June 2011; September 2012; July 2016; May 2018	Succeeded by Félix Hernández; CC Sabathia; Clay Buchholz; Corey Kluber; Chris Sale
