= Maria Balinska =

American journalist

- Born: 1960 (age 65–66); New Jersey, US
- Education: Princeton University
- Occupations: Journalist, author
- Father: Michel Balinski

Maria Balinska (born 1960) is an American journalist and author who was the Executive Director of the US-UK Fulbright Commission from 2019 to 2025.

== Biography ==
Balinska was born in New Jersey, US and attended 10 schools in five countries before attending Princeton University, where she earned her bachelor's degree in 1982.

According to her, she became interested in journalism after the fall of Communism, reporting on the transformation of Poland as a freelance journalist.

She spent a decade as a radio producer and then Editor World Current Affairs at BBC. In 2008 she published The Bagel, which presents a history of the bagel, tracing its roots from ancient Rome to Poland to its flourishing in America. In 2010 she was a Nieman Fellow at Harvard University. In 2011, she founded Latitude News. That same year, she served as part of the launch team for The Conversation, later the Managing Editor and subsequently Editor-in-Chief.

From 2019 to 2025, Balinska served as the Executive Director of the US-UK Fulbright Commission.

Since 2025, she has been a Practitioner Associate with the Department of Politics and International Relations at the University of Oxford.

== Books ==
- The Bagel: The Surprising History of a Modest Bread: Maria Balinska, Yale University Press, 2009, ISBN 9780300158205
