= UK Fulbright Commission =

Scholarship foundation

US-UK Fulbright Commission
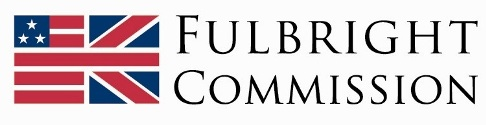
- Formation: 22 September 1948; 78 years ago
- Type: Non-profit organisation
- Headquarters: 89 Albert Embankment, London, England
- Services: Educational advice and scholarships
- Executive Director: Rowena Boddington (interim)
- Affiliations: Fulbright Program; EducationUSA
- Website: www.fulbright.org.uk

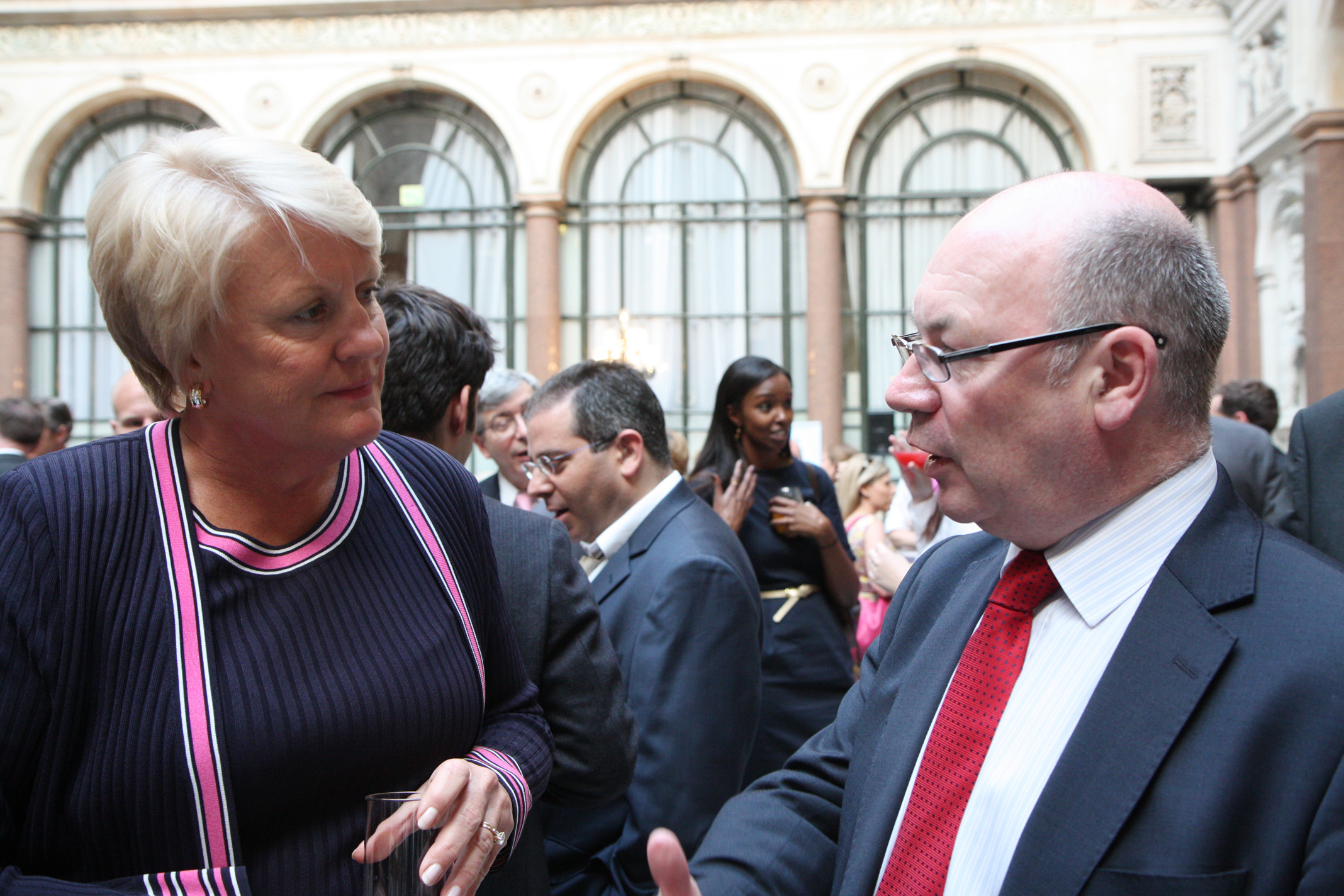
Foreign Office Under-Secretary of State Alistair Burt (right) with US Embassy chargé d'affaires Barbara J. Stephenson at a Commission reception in London, 2013

The US-UK Fulbright Commission is a non-profit organization with the purpose of "promoting cultural understanding between the US and UK" primarily through academic grants. It was created by a treaty signed by both countries on 22 September 1948 and is based in London.

== Global Fulbright Programme ==
The US-UK Fulbright Commission is part of the worldwide Fulbright Program. The global program was conceived by Senator J. William Fulbright after the Second World War to promote leadership, learning, and empathy between nations through educational exchange. The global program operates in over 155 countries and has supported 300,000 alumni in exchanges to and from the US. Within the global Fulbright program, 28 alumni have served as heads of state or government, 11 Fulbright alumni have been elected to US Congress, and one Fulbright alumnus has served as Secretary-General of the UN, 43 Fulbright alumni from 11 countries have received the Nobel Prize (including 2 in 2010), and 78 alumni have received Pulitzer Prizes.

== UK Fulbright Awards ==
Several scholarship programs are in operation between the US and the UK. However, the US-UK Fulbright Commission is the only organization that offers scholarships on a bi-national basis in any field and at any university. Fulbright offers a wide range of programs, including Distinguished Chairs for senior academics, postgraduate study scholarships, professional awards, and Summer Institutes for younger students. Since 1948, the UK Commission has supported approximately 15,000 British nationals on exchanges to the US and nearly 12,000 Americans to the UK. In recent years, around 50 citizens have received grants annually in both countries.

== Education USA Advisory Service ==
In addition to its scholarships, Fulbright provides information on and promotes US-UK exchange. In the school year 2009-2010, 8,861 British students studied in the US, and with the rise of tuition fees at UK universities, there has been increased interest in US study. That same year, more than 45,000 Americans studied abroad in the UK. Fulbright's advisory service is part of the Education USA network of over 450 advising centers worldwide. The advisors are the UK's official source of information on educational exchange opportunities to the US. Advisors can provide accurate, unbiased information about all accredited US higher education institutions. Fulbright's website provides information on how to apply to US universities. They also offer events on US study, such as their College Day undergraduate university fair each autumn, a Grad School Day workshop in the spring, student and parent seminars throughout the year, webinars and advisor training. Students can also receive additional advice by phone, email and in person at their office in Battersea.

== Funding and administration ==
The US-UK Commission is partially funded by the US State Department and the UK government through BIS. Additional support is provided by individual and institutional partners. Fulbright is governed by a Board of Commissioners made up of representatives nominated by the US and UK governments. Work is carried out by ten full-time staff and participants in their internship program. The Fulbright-Hays Act of 1961 states that the Bureau of Educational and Cultural Affairs (ECA) administers the global Fulbright Program under policy guidelines set by the J. William Fulbright Foreign Scholarship Board (FSB). ECA does this with the assistance of bi-national commissions and foundations, U.S. embassies, and cooperating agencies in the United States, such as the Institute of International Education (IIE) and Council for International Exchange of Scholars.

=== Executive directors ===
- Maria Balinska, (2019–2025)
- Rowena Boddington, interim (2025–present)

== Alumni ==
The British Fulbright Scholars Association (BFSA) is the alumni association for British Fulbright Scholars. The BFSA is a private, non-profit organization that promotes transatlantic relationships and international understanding through its network of Fulbright scholars. US-UK Fulbright alumni are also invited to join the State Alumni and Fulbright Association networks.

According to the Fulbright website, the following individuals are notable alumni of the scholarship program:

- Malcolm Bradbury - novelist
- Liam Byrne - politician
- Milton Friedman - economist and Nobel Prize Winner 1976
- Charles Kennedy - politician
- John Lithgow - actor
- Sylvia Plath - poet
- William Wallace, Baron Wallace of Saltaire - politician
- Ian Rankin - novelist
- Sir Christopher Rose - judge
- Shirley Williams - politician
- Toby Young - journalist and playwright
- Ben Broadbent - external member on the Monetary Policy Committee
- Richard Rogers - architect
- Siobhan Davies - choreographer
- Susanna White - film-maker
- Stewart Wood, Baron Wood of Anfield - advisor to Gordon Brown (2001–2009) and lecturer at Oxford University
- Mike Brearley - England cricketer
- Katherine Whitehorn - journalist
- Tony Badger - professor of American History and Master of Clare College
- Walter Bodmer - geneticist
- Lord Butterworth - founding VC of Warwick University, 1963-1985
- David Cannadine - historian
- Lord Higgins - Conservative MP and Financial Secretary to the Treasury, 1972-1974
- Ken Jones - President of ACPO until 2008, Deputy Commissioner of Police, Victoria, Australia
- Onora O'Neill - philosopher, Chair of Nuffield Foundation
- Sir Ian Kennedy - Chair, Independent Parliamentary Standards Committee
- Sir Ernst Gombrich - art historian
- Michael Atiyah - mathematician, President of the Royal Society, 1990-1995
- Baroness Deech - Chair, Bar Standards Board
- Rishi Sunak - former Prime Minister of the United Kingdom

== Legacy ==
The UK Fulbright Commission Archive is housed at the British Library. The papers can be accessed through the British Library catalogue. The Fulbright Association has a long-standing collaboration with the US-UK Educational Commission (The Fulbright Commission) to support an annual lecture series held in the UK called the Fulbright Legacy Lectures.
