= List of Hanshin Tigers seasons =

The Hanshin Tigers are a Nippon Professional Baseball team playing in the Central League. The team is based in Nishinomiya, Hyōgo Prefecture, next to their main stadium, Hanshin Koshien Stadium. They began play in 1935 as the Osaka Tigers in the Japanese Baseball League, later rebranding to Hanshin Club and then back to Osaka. In their time in the JBL, they won four league pennants. The team adopted their current name in 1960.

The Tigers are owned by Hanshin Electric Railway Co., Ltd., a subsidiary of Hankyu Hanshin Holdings Inc.

The Tigers have won the Japan Series two times (1985, 2023), tenth most among all current twelve NPB teams. They have won the Central League pennant seven times, most recently in 2025. Since the Climax Series era began for the Central League in 2007, the Tigers have appeared in the playoffs 13 times.

== Table key ==
Key to symbols and terms in season table
W	Number of regular season wins
L	Number of regular season losses
T	Number of regular season ties
GB	Games behind from league's first-place team^{[a]}
ROY	Rookie of the Year
MVP	Central League Most Valuable Player Award
ESA	Eiji Sawamura Award
MSA	Matsutaro Shoriki Award
Series MVP	Japan Series Most Valuable Player Award

== Season-by-season records ==
Japan Series Champions (1950–present) †	Japanese Baseball League / Central League Pennant (1938–1949, 1950–present)	Climax Series Berth (2007–present) ¤

Season	League	Finish	Wins	Losses	Ties	Win%	GB	Playoffs	Awards
Osaka Tigers
1936	JBL	^{[B]}	9	6	0	.600	^{[B]}		
1936 Fall	JBL		24	6	1	.800		Lost Playoff (Giants) 2–1	
1937 Spring	JBL	2nd	41	14	1	.745	0.5		
1937 Fall	JBL	1st	39	9	1	.813	—		
1938 Spring	JBL	1st	29	6	0	.829	—		
1938 Fall	JBL	2nd	27	13	0	.675	3.5		
1939	JBL	2nd	63	30	3	.677	3.5		
Hanshin Club
1940	JBL	2nd	64	37	3	.634	10.5		
1941	JBL	5th	41	43	0	.488	21		
1942	JBL	3rd	52	48	5	.520	21		
1943	JBL	3rd	41	36	7	.532	11		
1944	JBL	1st	27	6	2	.818	—		
1946	JBL	3rd	59	46	0	.562	7		Tadashi Wakabayashi (MVP)
Osaka Tigers
1947	JBL	1st	79	37	3	.681	—		
1948	JBL	3rd	70	66	4	.515	17		Tadashi Wakabayashi (MVP)
1949	JBL	6th	65	69	3	.485	20.5		Fumio Fujimura (MVP)
1950	Central	4th	70	67	3	.511	30		
1951	Central	3rd	61	52	3	.540	20.5		
1952	Central	2nd	79	40	1	.664	3.5		
1953	Central	2nd	74	56	0	.569	16		
1954	Central	3rd	71	57	2	.555	16		
1955	Central	3rd	71	57	2	.555	20.5		
1956	Central	2nd	79	50	1	.612	4.5		
1957	Central	2nd	73	54	3	.573	1		
1958	Central	2nd	72	58	0	.554	5.5		
1959	Central	2nd	62	59	9	.512	13		Minoru Murayama (ESA)
1960	Central	3rd	64	62	4	.508	6		
Hanshin Tigers
1961	Central	4th	60	67	3	.473	12.5		
1962	Central	1st	75	55	3	.577	—	Lost Japan Series (Flyers) 4–2–1	Minoru Murayama (MVP); Masaaki Koyama (ESA)
1963	Central	3rd	69	70	1	.496	14.5		
1964	Central	1st	80	56	4	.588	—	Lost Japan Series (Hawks) 4–3	Gene Bacque (ESA)
1965	Central	3rd	71	66	3	.518	19.5		Minoru Murayama (ESA)
1966	Central	3rd	64	66	5	.492	25		Minoru Murayama (ESA)
1967	Central	3rd	70	60	6	.538	14		
1968	Central	2nd	72	58	3	.554	5		Yutaka Enatsu (ESA)
1969	Central	2nd	68	59	3	.535	6.5		Kōichi Tabuchi (ROY)
1970	Central	2nd	77	49	4	.611	2		
1971	Central	5th	57	64	9	.471	12.5		
1972	Central	2nd	71	56	3	.559	3.5		
1973	Central	2nd	64	59	7	.520	0.5		
1974	Central	4th	57	64	9	.471	14		
1975	Central	3rd	68	55	7	.559	6		
1976	Central	2nd	72	45	13	.615	2		
1977	Central	4th	55	63	12	.466	21		
1978	Central	6th	41	80	9	.339	30.5		
1979	Central	4th	61	60	9	.504	8		Shigeru Kobayashi (ESA)
1980	Central	5th	54	66	10	.450	20.5		Akinobu Okada (ROY)
1981	Central	3rd	67	58	5	.536	8		
1982	Central	3rd	65	57	8	.533	4.5		
1983	Central	4th	62	63	5	.496	11.5		
1984	Central	4th	53	69	8	.434	23		
1985	Central	1st	74	49	7	.602	—	Won Japan Series (Lions) 4–2	Randy Bass (MVP); Randy Bass (Series MVP); Yoshio Yoshida (MSA)
1986	Central	3rd	60	60	10	.500	13.5		
1987	Central	6th	41	83	6	.331	37.5		
1988	Central	6th	51	77	2	.398	29.5		
1989	Central	5th	54	75	1	.419	30.5		
1990	Central	6th	52	78	0	.400	36		
1991	Central	6th	48	82	0	.369	26		
1992	Central	2nd	67	63	2	.515	2		Teruyoshi Kuji (ROY)
1993	Central	4t	63	67	2	.485	17		
1994	Central	4th	62	68	0	.477	8		Keiichi Yabu (ROY)
1995	Central	6th	46	84	0	.354	36		
1996	Central	6th	54	76	0	.415	23		
1997	Central	5th	62	73	1	.459	21		
1998	Central	6th	52	83	0	.385	27		
1999	Central	6th	55	80	0	.407	26		
2000	Central	6th	57	78	1	.422	21		
2001	Central	6th	57	80	3	.416	20.5		Norihiro Akahoshi (ROY)
2002	Central	4th	66	70	4	.485	19		
2003	Central	1st	87	51	2	.630	—	Lost Japan Series (Hawks) 4–3	Kei Igawa (MVP); Kei Igawa (ESA); Senichi Hoshino (MSA)
2004	Central	4th	66	70	2	.485	13		
2005	Central	1st	87	54	5	.617	—	Lost Japan Series (Marines) 4–0	Tomoaki Kanemoto (MVP)
2006	Central	2nd	84	58	4	.592	3.5		
2007	Central	3rd	74	66	4	.529	4.5	Lost Climax Series First Stage (Dragons) 2–0	Keiji Uezono (ROY)
2008	Central	2nd	82	59	3	.582	2	Lost Climax Series First Stage (Dragons) 2–1	
2009	Central	4th	67	73	4	.479	24.5		
2010	Central	2nd	78	63	3	.553	1	Lost Climax Series First Stage (Giants) 2–0	
2011	Central	4th	68	70	6	.493	9		
2012	Central	5th	55	75	14	.423	31.5		
2013	Central	2nd	73	67	4	.521	12.5	Lost Climax Series First Stage (Carp) 2–0	
2014	Central	2nd	75	68	1	.524	7	Won Climax Series First Stage (Carp) 1–0; Won Climax Series Final Stage (Giants) 4–1; Lost Japan Series (Hawks) 4–1	
2015	Central	3rd	70	71	2	.496	6	Lost Climax Series First Stage (Giants) 2–1	
2016	Central	4th	64	76	3	.457	24.5		
2017	Central	2nd	78	61	4	.561	10	Lost Climax Series First Stage (BayStars) 2–1	Shun Takayama (ROY)
2018	Central	6th	62	79	2	.440	20		
2019	Central	3rd	69	68	6	.504	6	Won Climax Series First Stage (BayStars) 2–1; Lost Climax Series Final Stage (Giants) 4–1	
2020	Central	2nd	60	53	7	.531	7.5	^{[C]}	
2021	Central	2nd	77	56	10	.579	1	Lost Climax Series First Stage (Giants) 2–0	
2022	Central	3rd	68	71	10	.579	12	Won Climax Series First Stage (BayStars) 2–1; Lost Climax Series Final Stage (Swallows) 4–0	
2023	Central	1st	85	53	5	.616	—	Won Climax Series Final Stage (Carp) 4–0; Won Japan Series (Buffaloes) 4–3	Shoki Murakami (MVP); Shoki Murakami (ROY); Kōji Chikamoto (Series MVP); Akinobu Okada (MSA)
2024	Central	2nd	74	63	6	.540	3.5	Lost Climax Series First Stage (Baystars) 2–0	
2025	Central	1st	85	54	4	.612	—	Won Climax Series Final Stage (BayStars) 4–0; Lost Japan Series (Hawks) 4–1	Teruaki Satō (MVP)
2026	Central	1st	79	62	2	.560	—	Lost Climax Series Final Stage (BayStars) 4–1	

== Notes ==
^{a} This is determined by calculating the difference in wins plus the difference in losses divided by two.
^{B} Records for 1936 seasons are incomplete.
^{[C]} Due to the COVID-19 pandemic, the Central League decided to send the regular season champion to the Japan Series directly with no Climax Series playoff.
