= 2014 Pacific League Climax Series =

Japanese baseball series

First stage
Team (Wins)		Manager	Season
Hokkaido Nippon-Ham Fighters (2)		Hideki Kuriyama	73–68–3 (.518), 6½ GB
Orix Buffaloes (1)		Hiroshi Moriwaki	80–62–2 (.563), 0 GB
- Dates: October 11–14

Final stage
Team (Wins)		Manager	Season
Fukuoka SoftBank Hawks (4)		Koji Akiyama	78–60–6 (.565), 0 GA
Hokkaido Nippon-Ham Fighters (3)		Hideki Kuriyama	73–68–3 (.518), 6½ GB
- Dates: October 15–20
- MVP: Yuki Yoshimura (SoftBank)

The 2014 Pacific League Climax Series (PLCS) consisted of two consecutive series, Stage 1 being a best-of-three series and Stage 2 being a best-of-six with the top seed being awarded a one-win advantage. The winner of the series advanced to the 2014 Japan Series, where they competed against the 2014 Central League Climax Series winner. The top three regular-season finishers played in the two series. The PLCS began on with the first game of Stage 1 on October 11 and ended with the final game of Stage 2 on October 20.

== First stage ==
=== Summary ===
Hokkaido Nippon-Ham Fighters won the series, 2–1.

Game	Date	Score	Location	Time	Attendance
1	October 11	Hokkaido Nippon-Ham Fighters – 6, Orix Buffaloes – 3	Kyocera Dome Osaka	4:01	35,889
2	October 12	Hokkaido Nippon-Ham Fighters – 4, Orix Buffaloes – 6	Kyocera Dome Osaka	3:32	36,012
3	October 14^{†}	Hokkaido Nippon-Ham Fighters – 2, Orix Buffaloes – 1 (10)	Kyocera Dome Osaka	4:17	32,588

† This game was originally scheduled to be played on Monday, October 13, but was postponed one day due to Typhoon Vongfong.

=== Game 1 ===
Saturday, October 11, 2014 at Kyocera Dome Osaka in Osaka, Osaka Prefecture
Team	1	2	3	4	5	6	7	8	9	R	H	E
Nippon-Ham	0	0	0	0	1	2	1	2	0	6	10	1
Orix	0	2	0	0	0	1	0	0	0	3	5	0
WP: Shohei Ohtani (1–0) LP: Mamoru Kishida (0–1) Sv: Hirotoshi Masui (1)

=== Game 2 ===
Sunday, October 12, 2014 at Kyocera Dome Osaka in Osaka, Osaka Prefecture
Team	1	2	3	4	5	6	7	8	9	R	H	E
Nippon-Ham	2	0	0	0	0	0	1	1	0	4	10	0
Orix	0	0	0	0	0	1	2	3	X	6	5	1
WP: Takahiro Mahara (1–0) LP: Keisuke Tanimoto (0–1) Sv: Yoshihisa Hirano (1); Home runs: NIP: Juan Miranda (1); ORX: Takahiro Okada (1)

=== Game 3 ===
Tuesday, October 14, 2014 at Kyocera Dome Osaka in Osaka, Osaka Prefecture
Team	1	2	3	4	5	6	7	8	9	10	R	H	E
Nippon-Ham	0	0	0	0	0	1	0	0	0	1	2	9	1
Orix	1	0	0	0	0	0	0	0	0	0	1	7	1
WP: Michael Crotta (1–0) LP: Yoshihisa Hirano (0–1) Sv: Hirotoshi Masui (2); Home runs: NIP: Sho Nakata (1); ORX: Shunta Goto (1)

== Final stage ==
=== Summary ===
Fukuoka SoftBank Hawks won the series, 4–3*.

Game	Date	Score	Location	Time	Attendance
1	October 15	Hokkaido Nippon-Ham Fighters – 2, Fukuoka SoftBank Hawks – 3	Yafuoku Dome	3:19	28,087
2	October 16	Hokkaido Nippon-Ham Fighters – 5, Fukuoka SoftBank Hawks – 1	Yafuoku Dome	3:30	29,775
3	October 17	Hokkaido Nippon-Ham Fighters – 12, Fukuoka SoftBank Hawks – 4	Yafuoku Dome	3:13	31,176
4	October 18	Hokkaido Nippon-Ham Fighters – 2, Fukuoka SoftBank Hawks – 5	Yafuoku Dome	4:20	31,647
5	October 19	Hokkaido Nippon-Ham Fighters – 6, Fukuoka SoftBank Hawks – 4 (11)	Yafuoku Dome	4:26	34,070
6	October 20	Hokkaido Nippon-Ham Fighters – 1, Fukuoka SoftBank Hawks – 4	Yafuoku Dome	3:24	38,561

* The Pacific League regular season champion is given a one-game advantage in the Final Stage.

=== Game 1 ===
Wednesday, October 15, 2014 at Fukuoka Yahuoku! Dome in Fukuoka, Fukuoka Prefecture
Team	1	2	3	4	5	6	7	8	9	R	H	E
Nippon-Ham	0	0	0	0	0	0	2	0	0	2	5	0
SoftBank	0	0	1	0	0	0	0	0	2X	3	9	0
WP: Ryota Igarashi (1–0) LP: Hiroshi Urano (0–1); Home runs: NIP: Sho Nakata (1); SOF: None

=== Game 2 ===
Thursday, October 16, 2014 at Fukuoka Yahuoku! Dome in Fukuoka, Fukuoka Prefecture
Team	1	2	3	4	5	6	7	8	9	R	H	E
Nippon-Ham	0	0	0	0	0	4	0	1	0	5	6	0
SoftBank	1	0	0	0	0	0	0	0	0	1	4	1
WP: Yohei Kagiya (1–0) LP: Shota Takeda (0–1); Home runs: NIP: Sho Nakata (2); SOF: Seiichi Uchikawa (1)

=== Game 3 ===
Friday, October 17, 2014 at Fukuoka Yahuoku! Dome in Fukuoka, Fukuoka Prefecture
Team	1	2	3	4	5	6	7	8	9	R	H	E
Nippon-Ham	4	3	0	0	1	4	0	0	0	12	12	0
SoftBank	1	0	0	0	2	0	0	0	1	4	14	1
WP: Mitsuo Yoshikawa (1–0) LP: Tadashi Settsu (0–1); Home runs: NIP: Dai-Kang Yang 2 (2), Eiichi Koyano (1), Sho Nakata (3); SOF: Seiichi Uchikawa (2)

=== Game 4 ===
Saturday, October 18, 2014 at Fukuoka Yahuoku! Dome in Fukuoka, Fukuoka Prefecture
Team	1	2	3	4	5	6	7	8	9	R	H	E
Nippon-Ham	0	1	0	0	1	0	0	0	0	2	4	0
SoftBank	1	1	2	0	0	0	1	0	X	5	13	0
WP: Kenichi Nakata (1–0) LP: Hiroshi Kisanuki (0–1) Sv: Dennis Sarfate (1); Home runs: NIP: None; SOF: Yuki Yanagita (1)

=== Game 5 ===
Sunday, October 19, 2014 at Fukuoka Yahuoku! Dome in Fukuoka, Fukuoka Prefecture
Team	1	2	3	4	5	6	7	8	9	10	11	R	H	E
Nippon-Ham	0	0	0	0	0	0	3	1	0	0	2	6	12	0
SoftBank	0	4	0	0	0	0	0	0	0	0	0	4	7	0
WP: Yohei Kagiya (2–0) LP: Dennis Sarfate (0–1) Sv: Hirotoshi Masui (1); Home runs: NIP: Sho Nakata (4); SOF: None

=== Game 6 ===
Monday, October 20, 2014 at Fukuoka Yahuoku! Dome in Fukuoka, Fukuoka Prefecture
Team	1	2	3	4	5	6	7	8	9	R	H	E
Nippon-Ham	0	0	0	0	0	0	0	0	1	1	9	0
SoftBank	0	0	0	2	1	0	0	1	X	4	8	1
WP: Kenji Otonari (1–0) LP: Naoyuki Uwasawa (0–1); Home runs: NIP: None; SOF: Toru Hosokawa (1)
