= Masayuki Kakefu =

Japanese baseball player (born 1955)

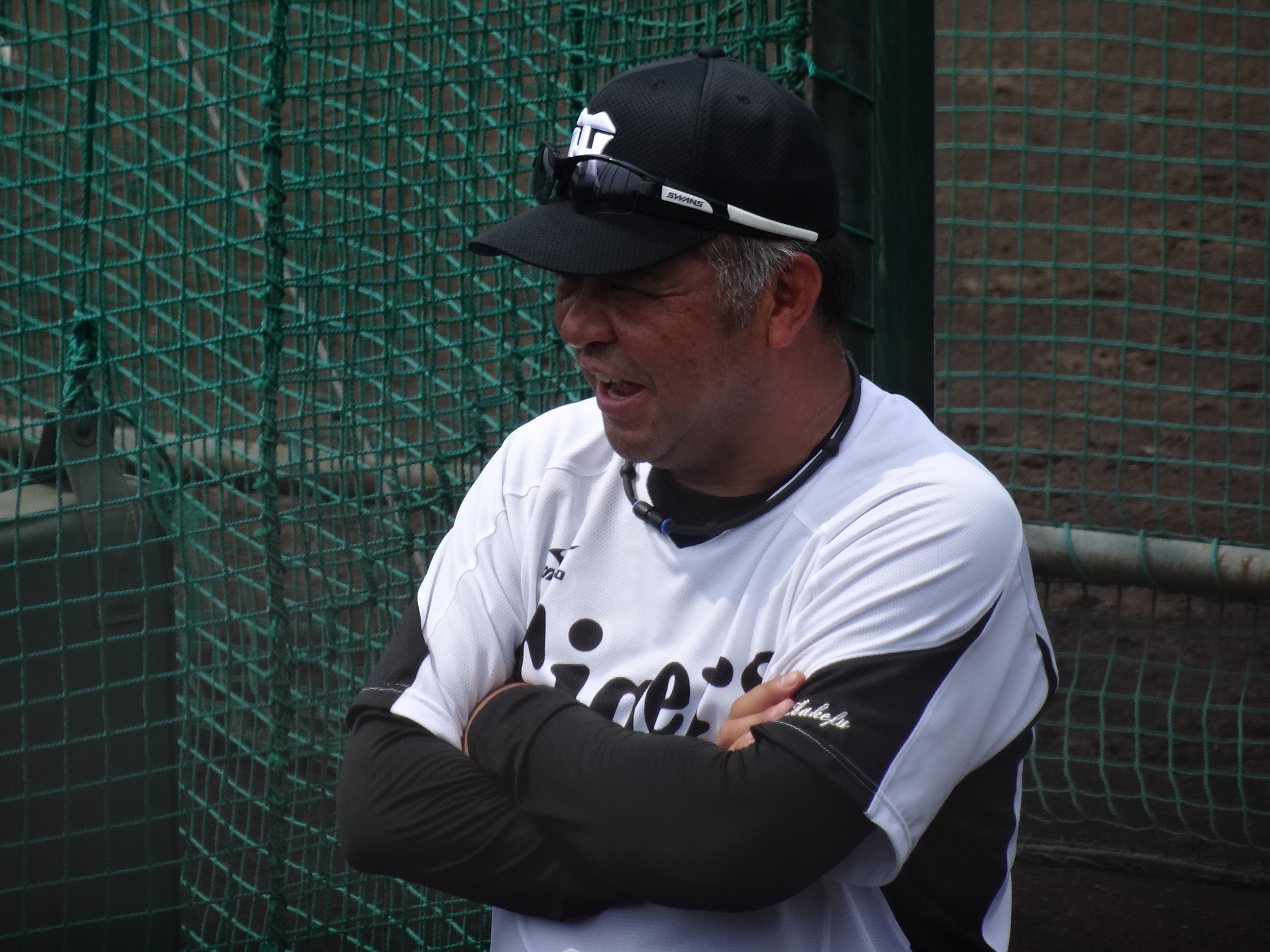
- Third baseman / Coach
- Born: May 9, 1955 (age 71); Sanjo, Niigata, Japan
- Batted: Left Threw: Right

NPB debut
- 1974, for the Hanshin Tigers

Last NPB appearance
- 1988, for the Hanshin Tigers

NPB statistics
- Batting average: .292
- Home runs: 349
- Runs batted in: 1,019
- Stats at Baseball Reference

Teams
- As player: Hanshin Tigers (1974–1988); As coach: Hanshin Tigers (2016–2017)

Career highlights and awards
- Japan Series champion (1985); 7x Best Nine Award (1976, 1977, 1978, 1979, 1981, 1982, 1985)

Member of the Japanese

Baseball Hall of Fame
- Induction: 2025
- Election method: Experts Division

Masayuki Kakefu (掛布 雅之, Kakefu Masayuki) (born May 9, 1955) is a Japanese former professional baseball third baseman. He played in Nippon Professional Baseball (NPB) for the Hanshin Tigers from 1974 to 1988. Known as “Mr. Tigers”, the popular slugger batted .292 lifetime for the Tigers in his career while hitting over 300 home runs and driving 1,019 runs batted in to go along with three home run titles and seven selections to the Best Nine Award. In 1985, he hit 40 home runs and batted .300 as the Tigers went all the way to the Japan Series and won it for the first time in team history. Kakefu took part in what has been called one of the most famous moments in Tiger history on the game played on April 17, 1985 when he hit the second of three consecutive home runs (Randy Bass hit the first while Akinobu Okada hit the third) against the Yomiuri Giants.

He was inducted into the Japanese Baseball Hall of Fame in 2025.

== See also ==
- List of top Nippon Professional Baseball home run hitters
- List of Nippon Professional Baseball players with 1,000 runs batted in
