= Mauro Gómez =

Dominican baseball player (born 1984)

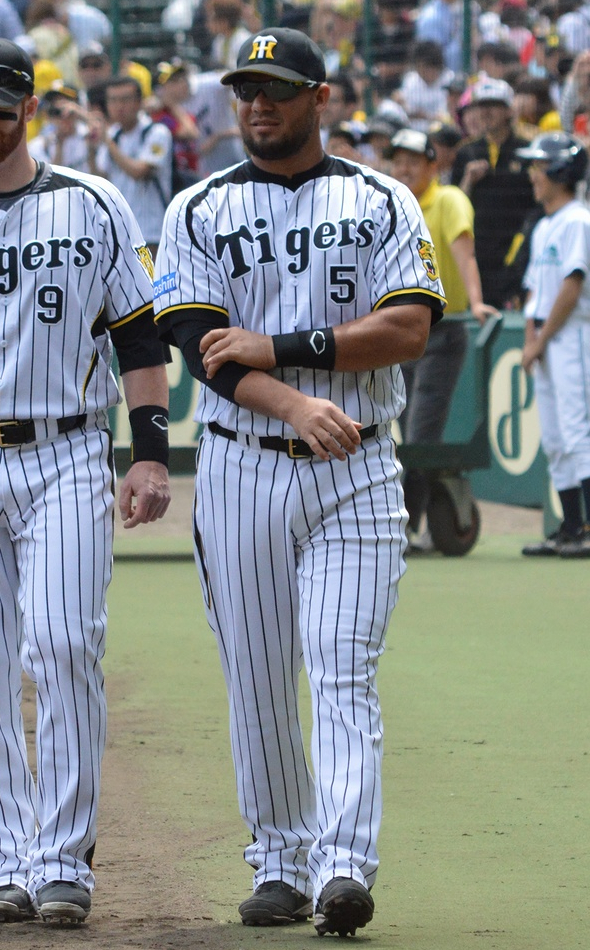
- Gómez with the Hanshin Tigers in 2014
- First baseman
- Born: September 7, 1984 (age 42); Baní, Dominican Republic
- Batted: Right Threw: Right

Professional debut
- MLB: May 13, 2012, for the Boston Red Sox
- NPB: March 28, 2014, for the Hanshin Tigers

Last appearance
- MLB: October 1, 2012, for the Boston Red Sox
- NPB: 2016, for the Hanshin Tigers

MLB statistics
- Batting average: .275
- Hits: 28
- Home runs: 2
- Runs batted in: 17

NPB statistics
- Batting average: .270
- Hits: 420
- Home runs: 65
- Runs batted in: 260
- Stats at Baseball Reference

Teams
- Boston Red Sox (2012); Hanshin Tigers (2014–2016)

Career highlights and awards
- 2014 Central League RBI champion

Mauro Alexis Gómez Acosta (born September 7, 1984) is a Dominican former professional baseball first baseman. He played in Major League Baseball (MLB) for the Boston Red Sox and in Nippon Professional Baseball (NPB) for the Hanshin Tigers.

== Career ==
=== Texas Rangers ===
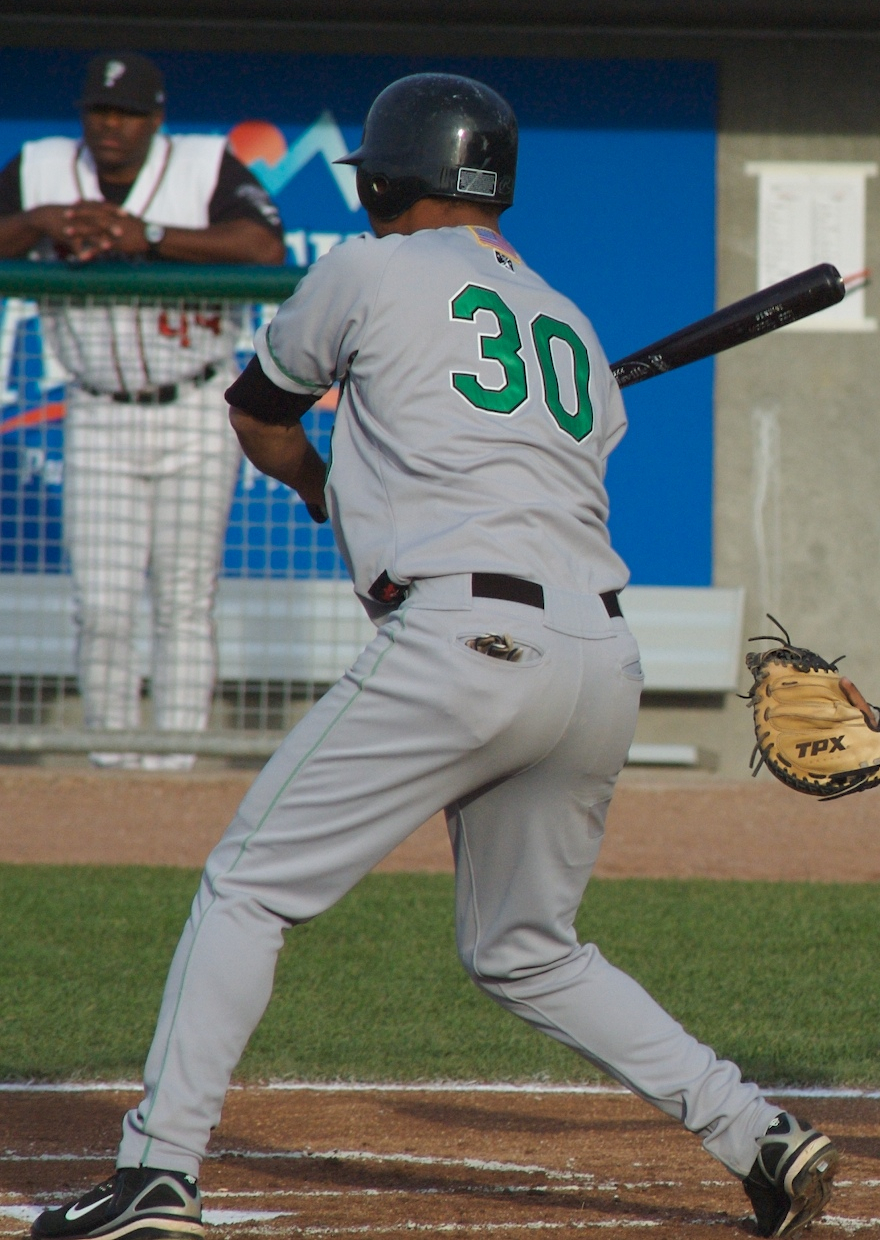
Gómez batting for the Clinton LumberKings, single-A affiliates of the Texas Rangers, in 2007

Gómez signed with the Texas Rangers as an international free agent on March 24, 2003.

In 2004, he made his professional debut in the Rookie-level Arizona League with the Arizona League Rangers. After returning to the Arizona League in 2005, the Rangers promoted Gómez to the Bakersfield Blaze of the High-A California League in 2006. He played for the Clinton LumberKings of the Single-A Midwest League in 2007. Gómez played for the Blaze in 2008 and 2009.

=== Atlanta Braves ===
Granted free agency after the 2009 season, Gómez signed with the Atlanta Braves.

In 2010, Gómez played for the Mississippi Braves of the Double-A Southern League. In 2011, he played for the Gwinnett Braves of the Triple-A International League. After the season, he became a free agent.

=== Boston Red Sox ===
After the 2011 season, Gómez signed with the Boston Red Sox, and began the 2012 season with the Pawtucket Red Sox of the International League. He set a PawSox record with 24 home runs in a season that year.

On May 13, 2012, Gómez was called up to the Red Sox when Darnell McDonald went on the disabled list, and after Jacoby Ellsbury was moved to the 60-day disabled list. Gómez made his Major League debut that afternoon as a defensive substitution at first base for Adrián González and struck out in his only plate appearance. He was optioned to Pawtucket on May 20 after making two pinch-hit appearances.

On July 4, the day after being recalled for the second time in 2012, Gómez recorded his first major league hit against the Oakland Athletics. On July 6, he recorded his first major league run batted in against the New York Yankees. He was optioned July 14, only to be called up four days later after an injury to David Ortiz then optioned the next day to accommodate the return of Dustin Pedroia. Despite his ups and downs, Gómez was among the leaders in several categories in the International League. He then rejoined the Red Sox in mid-August.

On August 28, Gómez was named International League MVP and post season All-Star after hitting a .310 average in 100 games with Pawtucket, with 59 of his 120 hits going for extra bases. He also tied for second with 24 home runs, while leading the league in slugging percentage (.589) and ranking fourth in RBI (74) and total bases (228).

On March 31, 2013, Gómez was designated for assignment by the Red Sox.

=== Toronto Blue Jays ===
On April 8, 2013, he was claimed by the Toronto Blue Jays, and assigned to their Triple-A affiliate Buffalo Bisons. He was designated for assignment on September 3.

=== Washington Nationals ===
On September 5, 2013, Gómez was claimed off waivers by the Washington Nationals. He was released on November 14 without playing a game in the Washington organization. Gómez was released to sign with Japan, by his request.

=== Hanshin Tigers ===
Gómez signed with the Hanshin Tigers of Nippon Professional Baseball on November 18, 2013, and was assigned the jersey number 5. Due to unfortunate circumstances however, he had a somewhat delayed introduction to Japan. He was scheduled miss to the first few days of spring camp in order to be with his family for the birth of his daughter. His arrival was further delayed when his child fell ill and was in the hospital a few days.

Gómez made his NPB debut on the March 28 opening night, going 2-for-4, with two RBI. Gómez put to rest any concerns on whether he could make a smooth transition by hitting .327 with four homers and 33 RBI in his first month. He then went on to reach base at least once in each of the first 27 games of the season, breaking the franchise record of 24 that had been held by Yutaka Wada, the Tigers’ current manager, since 1997. Gómez hit a brief slump during mid-season, but returned to his slugging ways in August, leading the Tigers with 25 doubles, 19 home runs, 83 RBI and a .506 slugging percentage. Together with Matt Murton, the Hanshin's clean-up duo started growing beards in June reviving memories of famously bearded Hanshin legend Randy Bass, who led the team to its only Japan Series title in 1985. Gómez said once he has hit 20 home runs, perhaps he'll shave off the beard.

In the September 20 game against Chunichi, Gómez scored 2 singles and a solo homer, and became the first foreign player in franchise history to record over 100 RBI in their first year in the NPB. He is 17th foreign player in NPB history to record 100 or more RBI in his first year in the NPB, first since Tony Blanco notched 110 in 2009. He joined Bass (134 in 1985, 109 in 1986), George Arias (107 in 2003), and Craig Brazell (117 in 2010) as the only foreign Hanshin players to notch 100 or more RBI in a season. He finished the season with 109 runs including 26 homers, and won the RBI title and Best Nine Award in his first NPB season.

Gómez played a key role as the Tiger's clean-up hitter during the postseason Climax Series against their archrivals Yomiuri Giants. Out of the 22 runs scored during the series, he drove in 8 - including a 2-run homer in his first at-bat at Tokyo Dome, and set a new Central League record for Climax Series RBI. He helped secure the Tigers a spot in the Japan Series, their first participation since 2005. Gómez's performances were worse in the following two seasons, and on November 15, 2016, he was released by the club.

On January 25, 2017, Gómez had contract negotiations with the Samsung Lions of the KBO League, but the club refused to close the deal after Gómez failed his medical test with problems regarding his knees.
