= Akinobu Okada =

Japanese baseball manager and former player (born 1957)

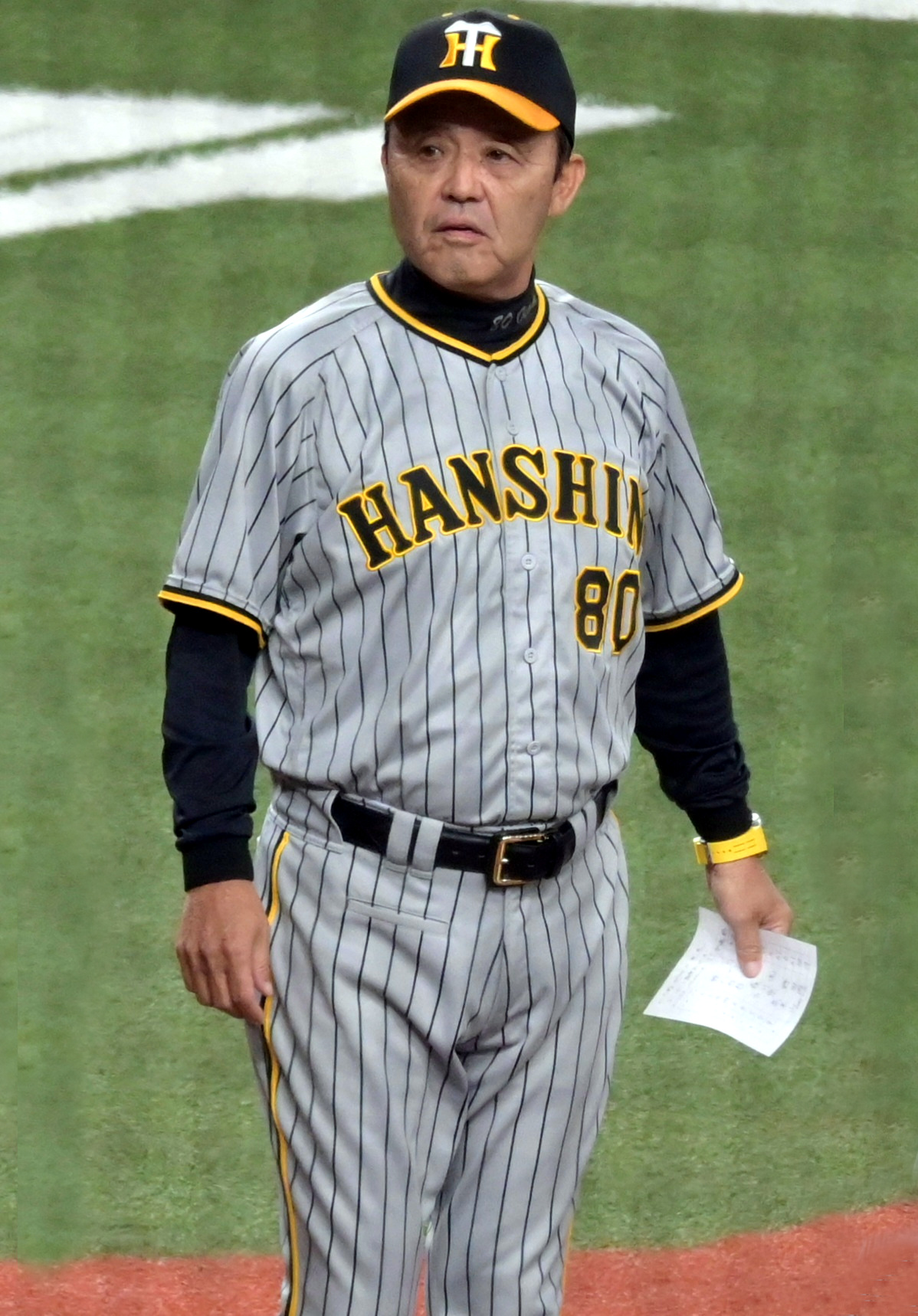
- Okada in 2023
- Infielder / Manager
- Born: November 25, 1957 (age 68); Chuo-ku, Osaka, Osaka Prefecture, Japan
- Batted: Right Threw: Right

NPB debut
- April 11, 1980, for the Hanshin Tigers

Last NPB appearance
- October 2, 1995, for the Orix BlueWave

NPB statistics
- Batting average: .277
- Hits: 1,520
- Home runs: 247
- RBIs: 1434
- Stats at Baseball Reference

Managerial statistics
- Wins: 747
- Losses: 639

Teams
- As player: Hanshin Tigers (1980–1993); Orix BlueWave (1994–1995); As manager: Hanshin Tigers (2004–2008); Orix Buffaloes (2010–2012); Hanshin Tigers (2023–2024)

Career highlights and awards
- 2× Japan Series champion (1985, 2023); 1980 Central League Rookie of the Year

Akinobu Okada (岡田 彰布, Okada Akinobu) (born November 25, 1957) is a Japanese former professional baseball infielder and manager. He played in Nippon Professional Baseball (NPB) from 1980 to 1995 for the Hanshin Tigers and Orix BlueWave.

== Career ==
=== Playing career ===
Okada played, mostly as a second baseman, for the Hanshin Tigers from 1980 to 1993, winning the Central League Rookie of the Year in 1980. In 1993, he was traded to the Orix BlueWave. He played there until 1995.

=== Coaching career ===
He managed the Hanshin Tigers from 2004 to 2008, leading the team to the Central League pennant in 2005.

In November 2008, he entered into a contract with the Daily Sports Company as a commentator. In 2009, he appeared on Asahi Broadcasting Corporation (ABC, AM radio, Terrestrial TV), Sky A Sports Plus (SKY PerfecTV!, satellite TV) and other broadcasting stations in the Kansai region.

Okada returned to the field in 2010, managing the Orix Buffaloes from 2010 to 2012.

On September 26, 2022, Okada was hired to serve as the manager for the Hanshin Tigers, marking his second managerial stint with the club. During his first season back in 2023, the Hanshin Tigers defeated Okada's former team he managed, the Orix Buffaloes, 4–3 in the 2023 Japan Series. This not only gave Okada a championship as a manager for Hanshin, but also ended the Tigers' championship drought that started back in 1985. On October 2, 2024, Okada announced that he would be stepping down following the season.

Sporting positions
Preceded by Senichi Hoshino; Akihiro Yano	Hanshin Tigers manager 2004–2008; 2023–2024	Succeeded by Akinobu Mayumi; Kyuji Fujikawa
Preceded by Daijiro Oishi	Orix Buffaloes manager 2010–2012	Succeeded by Hiroshi Moriwaki
