= Seung-hwan Oh =

South Korean baseball player (born 1982)

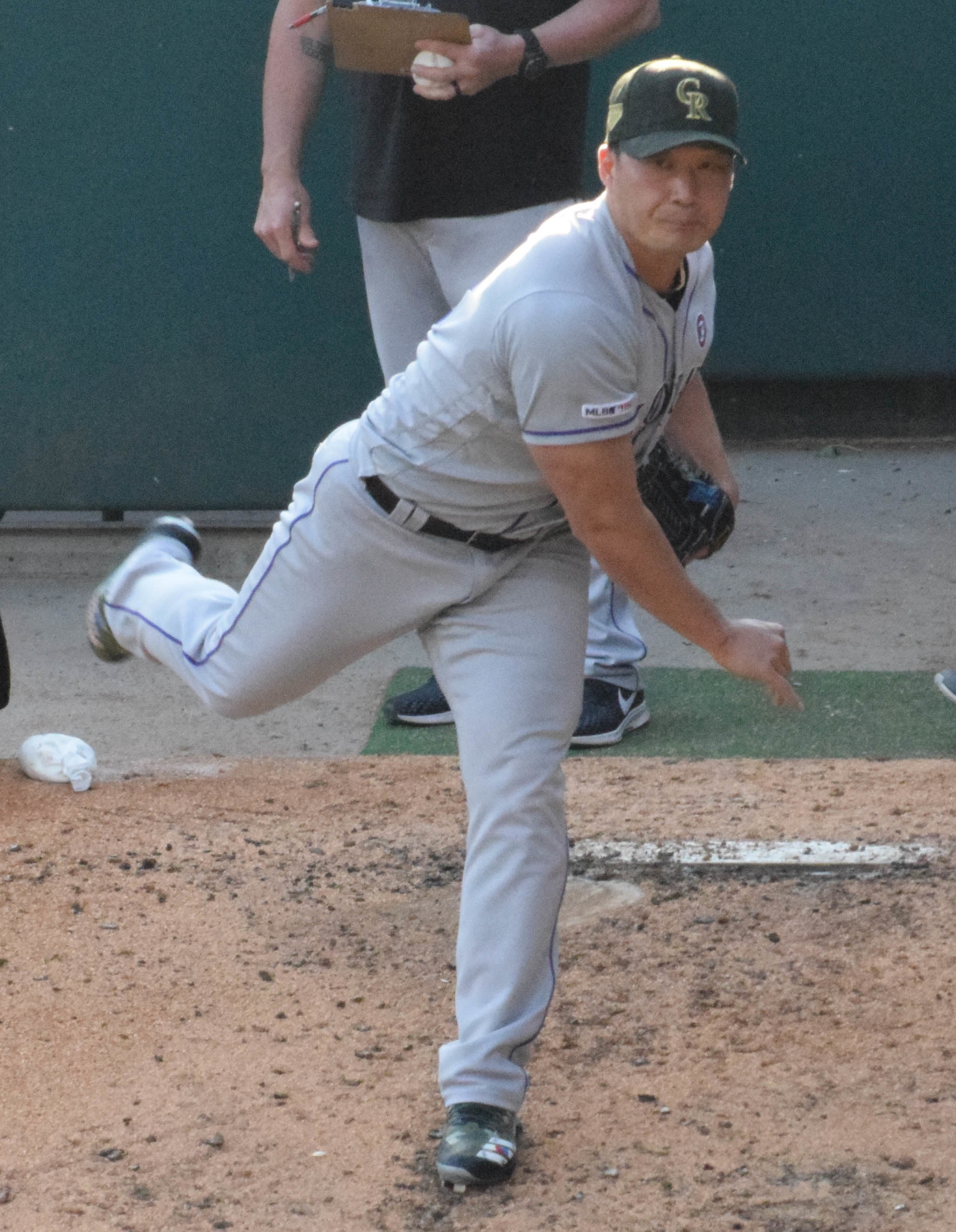
- Oh with the Colorado Rockies in 2019
- Relief pitcher
- Born: July 15, 1982 (age 44); Jeongeup, South Korea
- Batted: Right Threw: Right

Professional debut
- KBO: April 3, 2005, for the Samsung Lions
- NPB: March 29, 2014, for the Hanshin Tigers
- MLB: April 3, 2016, for the St. Louis Cardinals

Last appearance
- KBO: September 30, 2025, for the Samsung Lions
- NPB: September 25, 2015, for the Hanshin Tigers
- MLB: May 30, 2019, for the Colorado Rockies

KBO statistics
- Win–loss record: 44–33
- Earned run average: 2.32
- Strikeouts: 865
- Saves: 427

NPB statistics
- Win–loss record: 4–7
- Earned run average: 2.25
- Strikeouts: 147
- Saves: 80

MLB statistics
- Win–loss record: 16–13
- Earned run average: 3.31
- Strikeouts: 252
- Saves: 42
- Stats at Baseball Reference

Teams
- Samsung Lions (2005–2013); Hanshin Tigers (2014–2015); St. Louis Cardinals (2016–2017); Toronto Blue Jays (2018); Colorado Rockies (2018–2019); Samsung Lions (2020–2025)

Career highlights and awards
- KBO: KBO Rookie of the Year (2005); 8× KBO All-Star (2005–2008, 2011–2013, 2022); 6× KBO saves leader (2006–2008, 2011–2012, 2021); KBO career saves leader; 5× Korean Series champion (2005–2006, 2011–2013); 2× Korean Series MVP (2005, 2011); Asia Series champion (2011); NPB: NPB All-Star (2015); 2× CL saves leader (2014–2015); CLCS MVP (2014)
Medals
Men's baseball
Representing South Korea
World Baseball Classic
Silver medal – second place	2009 Los Angeles	Team
Summer Olympics
Gold medal – first place	2008 Beijing	Team
Asian Games
Bronze medal – third place	2006 Doha	Team
World University Baseball Championship
Bronze medal – third place	2004 Tainan	Team

- Seung-hwan Oh
- Hangul: 오승환
- Hanja: 吳昇桓
- RR: O Seunghwan
- MR: O Sŭnghwan

Seung-hwan Oh (Hangul: Korean: 오승환; Hanja: 吳昇桓; Korean pronunciation: [o.sɯŋ.ɦwan]; born July 15, 1982) is a South Korean former professional baseball relief pitcher. He played in the KBO League for the Samsung Lions, in Nippon Professional Baseball (NPB) for the Hanshin Tigers, and in Major League Baseball (MLB) for the St. Louis Cardinals, Toronto Blue Jays, and Colorado Rockies. In the KBO, he was the leagues' first (and only) player to reach the 300- and 400-save milestones, and is the all-time saves leader.

Oh is known as "Dol-bucheo" (Stone Buddha) for being unshaken and maintaining an emotionless face in every situation. His prowess as a relief pitcher also earned him the nickname "Kkeut-pan Wang" (Final Boss) in South Korea and among Cardinals fans.

== Amateur career ==
Oh attended Kyunggi High School in Seoul, South Korea. He had been a pitcher since he began baseball, then switched to the outfield after suffering serious arm injuries in 1999. He joined the 2001 KBO draft at the end of his last high school season, but, despite intriguing some MLB scouts, went undrafted, and Oh elected to attend college instead.

Upon graduation from high school, Oh started his collegiate career at Dankook University, but missed the entire 2001 and 2002 seasons after undergoing Tommy John surgery in 2001.

In 2003, he came back to the mound, pitching limited innings as a relief pitcher.

In 2004, his senior year at Dankook University, Oh won most of the Korean college pitching awards. In June, Oh made his first appearance for the South Korea national baseball team at the 2004 World University Baseball Championship held in Tainan, Taiwan. He led his team to the bronze medal, playing most of the games in closer duty.

== Professional career ==
=== Samsung Lions (2005–2013) ===
The Samsung Lions selected Oh in the second round (5th pick, 12th overall) of the 2005 KBO First Year Players draft. After signing with the club, he contributed a strong rookie season as a setup man and closer in 2005, going 10–1 with a 1.18 ERA, 16 saves (sixth in the league) and 115 strikeouts (fifth in the league) in 99 innings pitched over 61 games. In the 2005 Korean Series, he pitched seven scoreless innings with 11 strikeouts, appearing in three games as a closer to lead his team to the championship. He won the Korean Series Most Valuable Player Award. After the season, Oh was named the KBO League Rookie of the Year.

Prior to his second season, Oh was selected to the roster of the South Korea national baseball team for the inaugural World Baseball Classic. That year, he achieved the first of two consecutive seasons with 40-plus saves, 2006 and 2007. His 47 saves in 2006 set a KBO League record for one season, a total he repeated in 2011.

Recording his 100th save in fewer games than anyone in KBO League history, Oh became the KBO League's all-time saves leader with 277. He collected his 200th save in his 333rd career appearance, making him the fastest player in all of the world's top professional leagues to achieve that total, surpassing the mark of 359 forged by Jonathan Papelbon of Major League Baseball.

A shoulder injury began interfering with Oh's performance in 2009 and continued into 2010. He had his second elbow surgery to remove bone spurs in 2010 and returned to the playoffs in the same year.

While Oh was still playing for the Lions, they became KBO League champions four more times. The Lions defeated the Fukuoka SoftBank Hawks, the Nippon Professional Baseball champions, to earn the Asia Series championship in 2011, and become the first non-Japanese team to win. Oh earned his second Korean Series MVP Award in 2011.

He also posted a stellar 1.69 ERA in 444 games over the nine seasons that he played for Samsung Lions. Every season with the Lions, Oh turned in an ERA under 2.00, except 2009–10, which were shortened by injuries.

=== Hanshin Tigers (2014–2015) ===
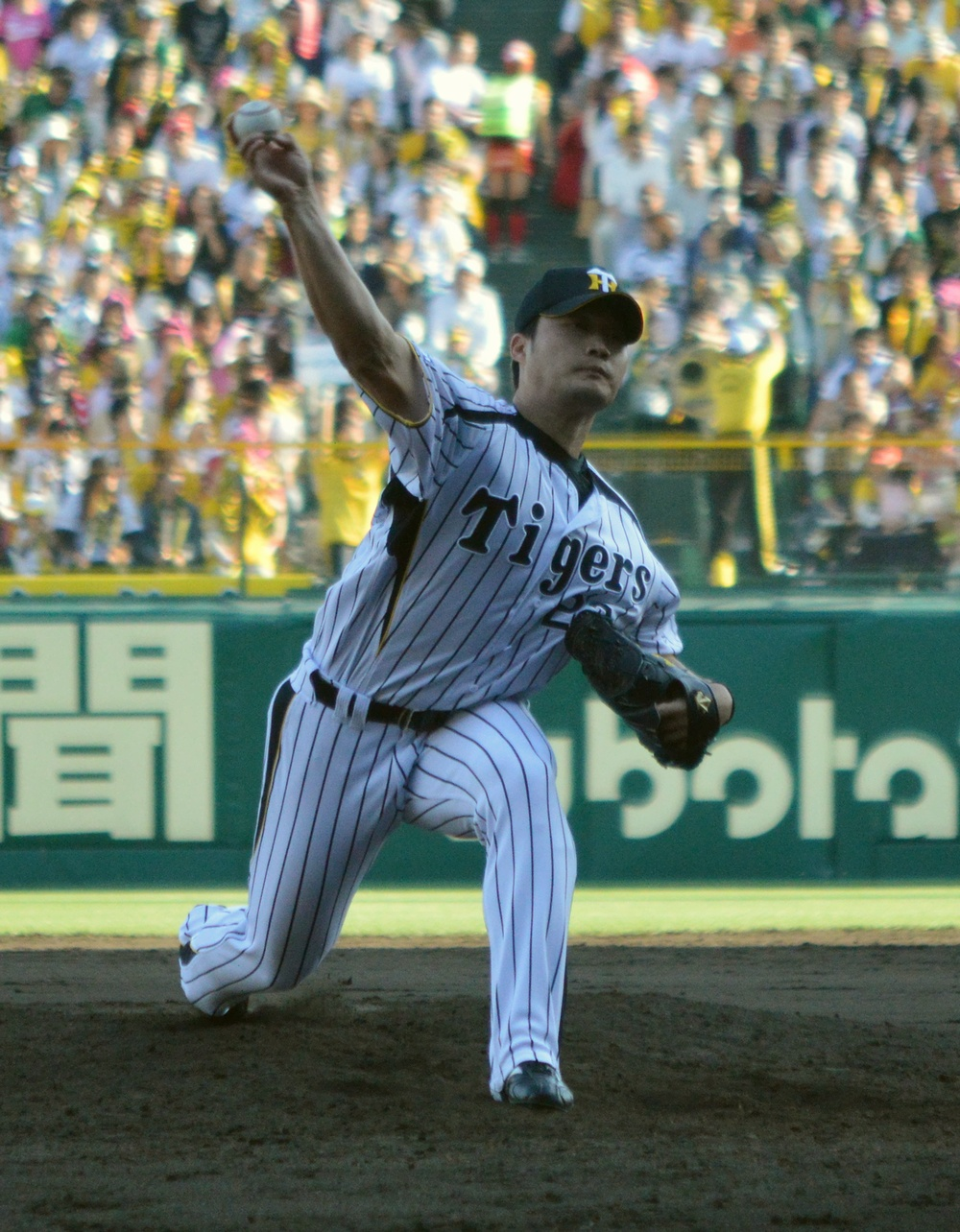
Oh with the Hanshin Tigers in 2014

On November 22, 2013, Oh signed a two-year, 990 million yen contract with the Hanshin Tigers, the biggest contract for a Korean baseball player in Japan. Tigers' manager Wada Yutaka suggested offering some Korean-language classes for his players to better communicate with their new teammate, especially the catchers and pitching coaches.

All throughout the 2014 season, he played the role as the Tiger's top closer. He became the second Korean player to break the 300-save mark after Lim Chang-yong in a 3–0 defeat of Yomiuri Giants on July 22, 2014. On the September 24 match with the BayStars, he picked up his 36th save of the season and broke the NPB record for saves by a foreign pitcher in his first year in the NPB. Eddie Gaillard (2000) and Dennis Sarfate (2011) each saved thirty-five games in a season. He also now holds the record for the most saves by a Korean pitcher in their first year in Japan, beating the previous record set by Lim, who had 33 saves in 2008 when he started playing for the Swallows. Oh notched a total of 39 saves for the season, breaking the NPB record for saves by a Korean pitcher in a single season set by Sun Dong-yeol (38 saves) with Chunichi in 1997.

Oh played an instrumental role in Hanshin's advance to the Japan Series in October. After pitching four innings in two games against Hiroshima during the Climax Series (first stage), he took the mound in all four games against the Yomiuri Giants and successfully secured consecutive victories for his team. Including the last five regular-season games, he pitched in 11 consecutive games and recorded the save in all of them. When the Tigers finally won the series in October 18, Oh received the Climax Series MVP award, becoming the first Korean pitcher to do so in his first year in NPB. His fast and heavy balls, together with his calm and unwavering expression even in crisis situations, earned him a new nickname "Stone Guardian" from Japanese baseball fans.

With Hanshin in 2015, Oh appeared in 54 games, logging 69 1/3 innings and striking out 66, walking 16 and allowing a 2.75 ERA. He saved another 41 games that year, breaking his own NPB single-season record for most saves by a Korean pitcher. In two seasons while playing in Japan, he had a 2.25 ERA with 80 saves. Through eleven total professional seasons in South Korea and Japan, he recorded 357 saves, a 1.81 ERA, and 10.7 strikeouts per nine innings in 646 1/3 IP.

=== St. Louis Cardinals (2016–2017) ===
On January 11, 2016, Oh signed a one-year contract with the St. Louis Cardinals of Major League Baseball (MLB), with a club option for a second season. The Cardinals had scouted him for seven years while he pitched in Asia. During contract negotiations with St. Louis, Oh indicated that his goal was to become the first player to appear in the Korean Series, the Japan Series, and the World Series. He was initially assigned to help set up for incumbent closer Trevor Rosenthal. Oh made his Major League debut on Opening Day 2016 against the Pittsburgh Pirates. He pitched one inning, walking two batters and striking out two batters, while throwing 27 pitches. He earned his first major league win against the Atlanta Braves on April 10, pitching a scoreless inning in a 12–6 outcome.

In May, Oh began to receive attention as a top candidate for the National League (NL) Rookie of the Year Award. In his first 31 games and 32 2/3 innings, he had struck out 46 batters — tied for first among NL relievers — while walking eight batters and permitting an ERA of 1.65. On June 25, the Cardinals removed a struggling Rosenthal from the role as closer, and determined that Oh, lefty Kevin Siegrist, and righty Jonathan Broxton would instead serve in the role by committee. Oh recorded his first MLB save on July 2 by pitching a perfect ninth with two strikeouts against the Milwaukee Brewers. By saving both games of a doubleheader against the San Diego Padres on July 20, Oh was the first Cardinals pitcher to do so since Jason Isringhausen in 2004. When Oh finished his 30th game on September 9, he triggered the 2017 option, worth $2.75 million.

In 2017, he was 1–6 with a 4.10 ERA, and led the major leagues in intentional walks, with nine.

=== Toronto Blue Jays (2018) ===
On February 26, 2018, Oh signed a one-year, $2 million contract with the Toronto Blue Jays that included a vesting option for the 2019 season.

=== Colorado Rockies (2018–2019) ===
On July 26, 2018, the Blue Jays traded Oh to the Colorado Rockies for Forrest Wall, Chad Spanberger, and a player to be named later or cash considerations. On July 16, 2019, it was announced that Oh would undergo surgery and miss the remainder of the 2019 season, and he was subsequently designated for assignment on July 23. He was released on July 26, 2019. In 2019, his cutter was on average the slowest in major league baseball, at 82.2 mph.

=== Second stint with Samsung Lions (2019–2025) ===
On August 5, 2019, Oh returned to Korea and signed with the Samsung Lions of the KBO League, the team he began his professional career with. In the 2020 season, Oh was scheduled to wrap up his remaining 30 games of disciplinary action and took the mound in mid-June. As scheduled, he returned to the game against Kiwoom on June 9. In 45 appearances for the team, Oh logged a 3-2 record and 2.64 ERA with 39 strikeouts and 18 saves across 47 2/3 innings pitched.

Oh made 64 relief appearances for Samsung during the 2021 season, compiling an 0-2 record and 2.03 ERA with 57 strikeouts and 44 saves over 62 innings of work. He made another 57 outings for the Lions in 2022, posting a 6-2 record and 3.32 ERA with 51 strikeouts and 31 saves across 57 innings.

Oh pitched in 58 contests for Samsung during the 2023 campaign, registering a 4-5 record and 3.45 ERA with 44 strikeouts and 30 saves across 62 2/3 innings pitched. He made 58 appearances for the Lions in 2024 as well, logging a 3-9 record and 4.91 ERA with 42 strikeouts and 27 saves over 55 innings of work.

Oh pitched in 12 games for Samsung in 2025, but struggled to an 8.00 ERA with seven strikeouts across nine innings pitched. Oh retired from professional baseball following the conclusion of the season.

== International career ==
Year	Venue	Competition	Team	Individual Note
2006	United States	World Baseball Classic	Bronze medal	0–0, 1 SV, 0.00 ERA (4 G, 3.0 IP, 0 ER, 3 K)
2006	Qatar	Asian Games	Bronze medal	0–1, 0 SV, 7.71 ERA (2 G, 2.1 IP, 2 ER, 3 K)
2007	Chinese Taipei	Asian Baseball Championship	Silver medal	
2008	China	Olympic Games	Gold medal	0–0, 1 SV, 0.00 ERA (2 G, 1.2 IP, 0 ER, 1 K)
2009	United States	World Baseball Classic	Silver medal	0–1, 0 SV, 18.00 ERA (2 G, 1.0 IP, 2 ER, 1 K)

== Playing style ==
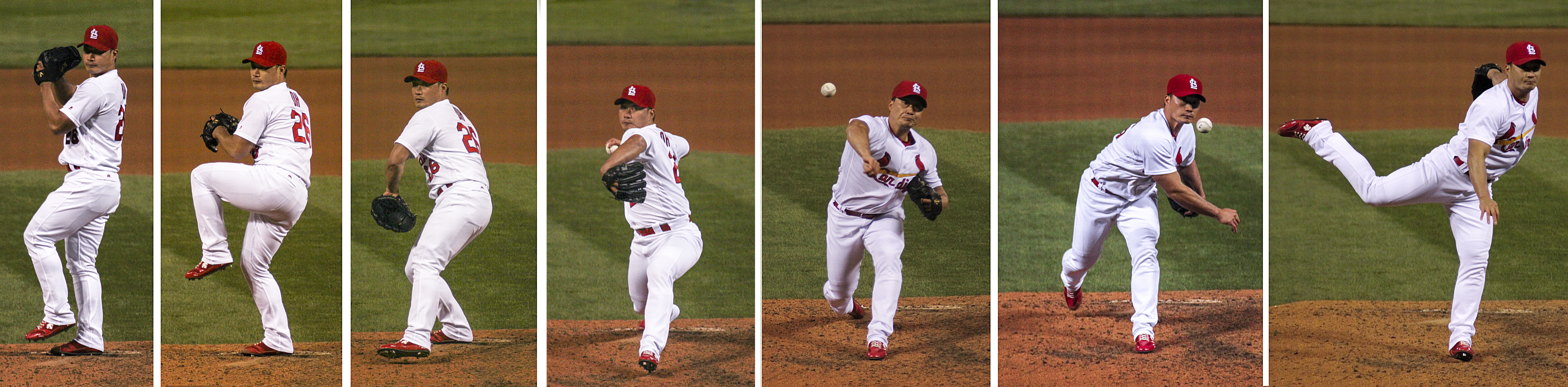
A sample of Oh's pitching motion in 2016

A right-handed pitcher, Oh stands 5 ft 10 in (178 cm) and weighs 205 pounds (93 kg). His primary pitches include a four-seam fastball — averaging 92–93 miles per hour (148–150 km/h) and topping out at 96 miles per hour (154 km/h) — and a mid-80s slider with a darting motion resembling a cutter.

Oh's signature pitch is the four-seam fastball, which, due to its hard rising movement, earned the nickname "Dol-jikgu" (stone fastball) in Korea. By varying the speeds of each pitch, he alters the movement. He also alters the delivery of his pitches, creating another factor to change the batter's concentration.

== Personal life ==
It was announced in April 2015 that Oh was in a relationship with Girls' Generation's Yuri. The couple were confirmed to have broken up in October 2015 after six months of dating due to the long distance in their relationship.

The subject of a Korean investigation related to gambling, authorities interrogated Oh about his activities in Macau in November 2014 with fellow Korean baseball player Lim Chang-yong. Korean law is unusually strict in that it does not ban gambling per se, although it does ban going to casinos based outside the country, even in places where gambling is legal. The Seoul Central District Prosecutors Office fined Oh and Lim in January 2016, and the KBO League suspended Oh for six months. With Japanese law toward gambling among athletes similarly restrictive, the Hanshin Tigers terminated his contract amid reports he was linked to a Korean crime organization.

Due to references from fans and media as "The Final Boss" and "Stone Buddha", Oh's nickname has frequently drawn comparisons to other notable nicknames of MLB players.

In another episode, he appeared on Lee Daeho's YouTube and said that he drank a lot during his career because he was mentally tired by blown saves.

== See also ==
- List of Major League Baseball players from South Korea
