= 2014 Nippon Professional Baseball season =

2014 NPB season
- League: Nippon Professional Baseball
- Sport: Baseball
- Duration: March 28 – October 30

Central League pennant
- League champions: Yomiuri Giants
- Runners-up: Hanshin Tigers
- Season MVP: Tomoyuki Sugano (Yomiuri)

Pacific League pennant
- League champions: Fukuoka SoftBank Hawks
- Runners-up: Orix Buffaloes
- Season MVP: Chihiro Kaneko (Orix)

Climax Series
- CL champions: Hanshin Tigers
- CL runners-up: Yomiuri Giants
- PL champions: Fukuoka SoftBank Hawks
- PL runners-up: Hokkaido Nippon-Ham Fighters

Japan Series
- Venue: Fukuoka Yafuoku! Dome, Chūō-ku, Fukuoka; Hanshin Koshien Stadium, Nishinomiya, Hyōgo
- Champions: Fukuoka SoftBank Hawks
- Runners-up: Hanshin Tigers
- Finals MVP: Seiichi Uchikawa (SoftBank)

NPB seasons
- ← 2013 2015 →

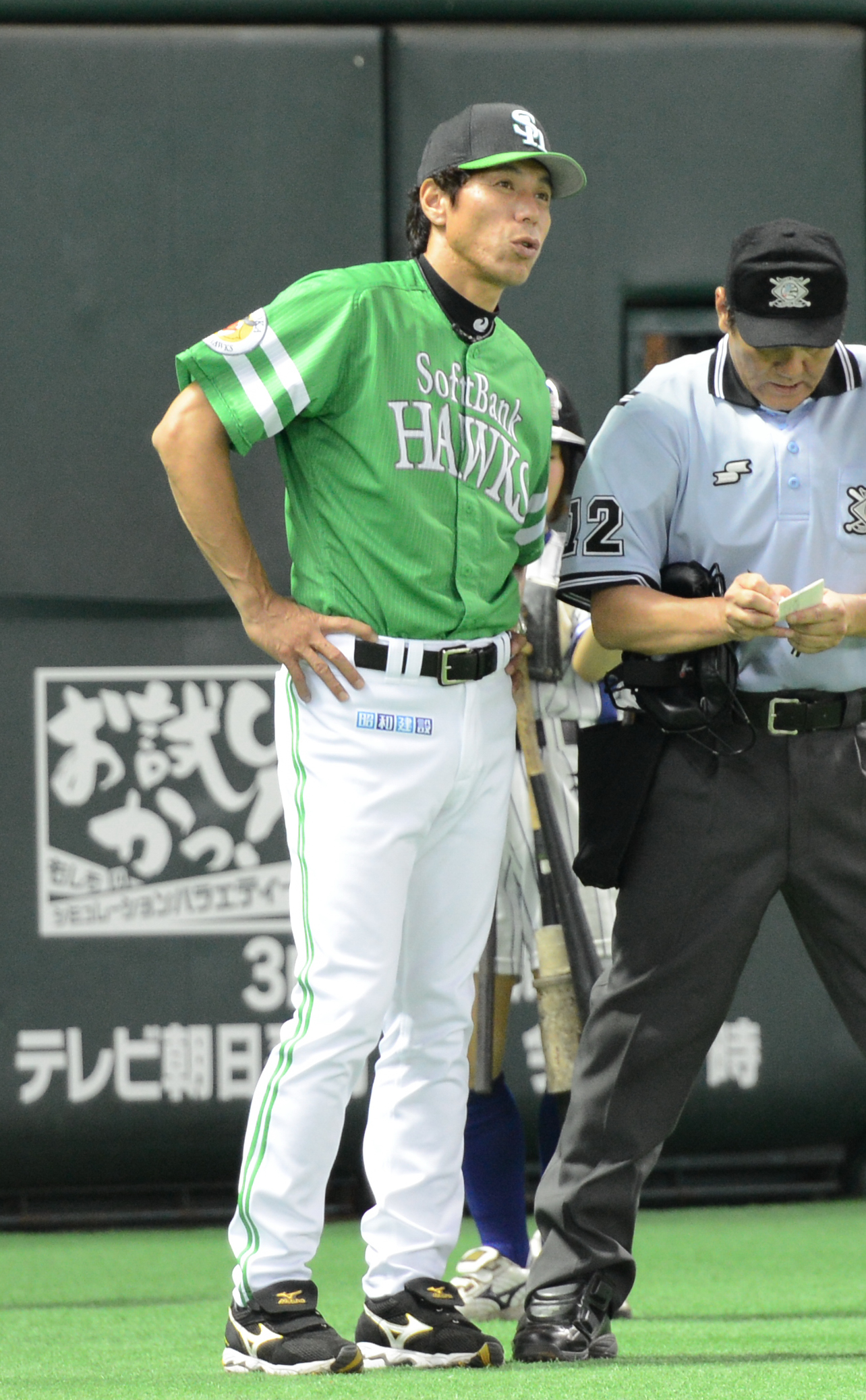
Koji Akiyama, manager of the Fukuoka SoftBank Hawks, at Fukuoka Dome

The 2014 Nippon Professional Baseball season was the 65th edition of NPB since reorganized in 1950.

== Regular season standings ==
Central League regular season standings
Team	G	W	L	T	Pct.	GB
Yomiuri Giants	144	82	61	1	.573	—
Hanshin Tigers	144	75	68	1	.524	7
Hiroshima Toyo Carp	144	74	68	2	.521	7.5
Chunichi Dragons	144	67	73	4	.479	13.5
Yokohama DeNA BayStars	144	67	75	2	.472	14.5
Tokyo Yakult Swallows	144	60	81	3	.426	21

Pacific League regular season standings
Team	G	W	L	T	Pct.	GB
Fukuoka SoftBank Hawks	144	78	60	6	.565	—
Orix Buffaloes	144	80	62	2	.563	—
Hokkaido Nippon-Ham Fighters	144	73	68	3	.518	6.5
Chiba Lotte Marines	144	66	76	2	.465	14.0
Saitama Seibu Lions	144	63	77	4	.450	16.0
Tohoku Rakuten Golden Eagles	144	64	80	0	.444	17.0

== Climax Series ==
Note: All of the games that are played in the first two rounds of the Climax Series are held at the higher seed's home stadium. The team with the higher regular-season standing also advances if the round ends in a tie.

First stage
Central League
2	Hanshin Tigers	1
3	Hiroshima Toyo Carp	0
Pacific League
2	Orix Buffaloes	1
3	Hokkaido Nippon-Ham Fighters	2

Final stage
1	Yomiuri Giants	1
2	Hanshin Tigers	4
1	Fukuoka SoftBank Hawks	4
3	Hokkaido Nippon-Ham Fighters	3

Japan Series
CL2	Hanshin Tigers	1
PL1	Fukuoka SoftBank Hawks	4

=== First stage ===
The regular season league champions, the Fukuoka SoftBank Hawks (PL) and the Yomiuri Giants (CL), received byes to the championship round.

==== Central League ====
Hanshin Tigers (1) vs. Hiroshima Toyo Carp (0)

Game	Date	Score	Location	Time	Attendance
1	October 11	Hiroshima Toyo Carp – 0, Hanshin Tigers – 1	Koshien Stadium	2:52	46,721
2	October 12	Hiroshima Toyo Carp – 0, Hanshin Tigers – 0	Koshien Stadium	3:35	46,815

==== Pacific League ====
Hokkaido Nippon-Ham Fighters (2) vs. Orix Buffaloes (1)

Game	Date	Score	Location	Time	Attendance
1	October 11	Hokkaido Nippon-Ham Fighters – 6, Orix Buffaloes – 3	Kyocera Dome	4:01	35,889
2	October 12	Hokkaido Nippon-Ham Fighters – 4, Orix Buffaloes – 6	Kyocera Dome	3:32	36,012
3	October 14*	Hokkaido Nippon-Ham Fighters – 2, Orix Buffaloes – 1	Kyocera Dome	4:17	32,588

* Postponed from October 13 due to Typhoon Vongfong

=== Final stage ===
The regular season league champions, the Fukuoka SoftBank Hawks (PL) and the Yomiuri Giants (CL), received a one-game advantage.

==== Central League ====
Hanshin Tigers (4) vs. Yomiuri Giants (1)

Game	Date	Score	Location	Time	Attendance
1	October 15	Hanshin Tigers – 4, Yomiuri Giants – 1	Tokyo Dome	2:59	44,871
2	October 16	Hanshin Tigers – 5, Yomiuri Giants – 2	Tokyo Dome	3:19	44,728
3	October 17	Hanshin Tigers – 4, Yomiuri Giants – 2	Tokyo Dome	3:44	46,025
4	October 18	Hanshin Tigers – 8, Yomiuri Giants – 4	Tokyo Dome	3:42	46,311

==== Pacific League ====
Fukuoka SoftBank Hawks (4) vs. Hokkaido Nippon-Ham Fighters (3)

Game	Date	Score	Location	Time	Attendance
1	October 15	Hokkaido Nippon-Ham Fighters – 2, Fukuoka SoftBank Hawks – 3	Fukuoka Dome	3:19	28,087
2	October 16	Hokkaido Nippon-Ham Fighters – 5, Fukuoka SoftBank Hawks – 1	Fukuoka Dome	3:30	29,775
3	October 17	Hokkaido Nippon-Ham Fighters – 12, Fukuoka SoftBank Hawks – 4	Fukuoka Dome	3:13	31,176
4	October 18	Hokkaido Nippon-Ham Fighters – 2, Fukuoka SoftBank Hawks – 5	Fukuoka Dome	4:20	31,647
5	October 19	Hokkaido Nippon-Ham Fighters – 6, Fukuoka SoftBank Hawks – 4	Fukuoka Dome	4:26	34,070
6	October 20	Hokkaido Nippon-Ham Fighters – 1, Fukuoka SoftBank Hawks – 4	Fukuoka Dome	3:24	38,561

== League leaders ==
=== Central League ===
Batting leaders
Stat	Player	Team	Total
Batting average	Matt Murton	Hanshin Tigers	.338
Home runs	Brad Eldred	Hiroshima Toyo Carp	37
Runs batted in	Mauro Gómez	Hanshin Tigers	109
Runs	Yoshihiro Maru; Tetsuto Yamada	Hiroshima Toyo Carp; Tokyo Yakult Swallows	106
Hits	Tetsuto Yamada	Tokyo Yakult Swallows	193
Stolen bases	Takayuki Kajitani	Yokohama DeNA BayStars	39

Pitching leaders
Stat	Player	Team	Total
Wins	Randy Messenger; Daisuke Yamai	Hanshin Tigers; Chunichi Dragons	13
Losses	Atsushi Nomi	Hanshin Tigers	13
Earned run average	Tomoyuki Sugano	Yomiuri Giants	2.33
Strikeouts	Randy Messenger	Hanshin Tigers	226
Innings pitched	Randy Messenger	Hanshin Tigers	208 1/3
Saves	Oh Seung-hwan	Hanshin Tigers	39

=== Pacific League ===
Batting leaders
Stat	Player	Team	Total
Batting average	Yoshio Itoi	Orix Buffaloes	.331
Home runs	Ernesto Mejía; Takeya Nakamura	Saitama Seibu Lions; Saitama Seibu Lions	34
Runs batted in	Sho Nakata	Hokkaido Nippon-Ham Fighters	100
Runs	Yuki Yanagita	Fukuoka SoftBank Hawks	91
Hits	Akira Nakamura	Fukuoka SoftBank Hawks	176
Stolen bases	Haruki Nishikawa	Hokkaido Nippon-Ham Fighters	43

Pitching leaders
Stat	Player	Team	Total
Wins	Chihiro Kaneko	Orix Buffaloes	16
Losses	Wataru Karashima; Luis Mendoza	Tohoku Rakuten Golden Eagles; Hokkaido Nippon-Ham Fighters	13
Earned run average	Chihiro Kaneko	Orix Buffaloes	1.98
Strikeouts	Takahiro Norimoto	Tohoku Rakuten Golden Eagles	204
Innings pitched	Takahiro Norimoto	Tohoku Rakuten Golden Eagles	202 2/3
Saves	Yoshihisa Hirano	Orix Buffaloes	40

== See also ==
- 2014 Korea Professional Baseball season
- 2014 Major League Baseball season
