= 1985 Japan Series =

Team (Wins)	Managers	Season
Hanshin Tigers (4)	Yoshio Yoshida	74–49–7 (.602), GA: 7
Seibu Lions (2)	Tatsuro Hirooka	79–45–6 (.637), GA: 15
- Dates: October 26 – November 2
- MVP: Randy Bass (Hanshin)
- FSA: Hiromichi Ishige (Seibu)

Broadcast
- Television: TBS (Game 1 and 6, JNN); Fuji TV (Game 2, FNN); ABC (Games 3 and 4, ANN); SUN-TV (Games 3, independent); MBS (Game 4, JNN); NHK General TV (Game 4); Yomiuri TV (Game 5, NNN)
- TV announcers: Akira Ishikawa (TBS), Etsuro Matsukura (Fuji TV), Akio Kuroda (ABC), Sadao Uekusa (ABC), Teruhisa Inoue (MBS), Toshiharu Shimamura (NHK), Shuichi Itchoda (Yomiuri TV)
- Radio: NHK Radio 1; TBS; QR; LF; Radio Nippon; ABC; MBS; Radio Osaka; Radio Kansai

The 1985 Japan Series was the championship series of Nippon Professional Baseball (NPB) for the 1985 season. The 36th edition of the Series, it was a best-of-seven playoff that matched the Central League champion Hanshin Tigers against the Pacific League champion Seibu Lions. Making their first appearance in the Japan Series since 1964, the Tigers finally won their first Japan Series championship. In the ensuing celebration, a perceived Curse of the Colonel was placed on the team after an apparent mishap of a statue by rowdy fans. Tigers did not win another Japan Series until 2023, when they defeated fellow Kansai region team, Orix Buffaloes. As for the Lions, they bounced back and won six of the next seven championships.

== Summary ==
PL Seibu Lions (4) vs. CL Hanshin Tigers (2)

Game	Date	Score	Location	Time	Attendance
1	October 26	Hanshin Tigers – 3, Seibu Lions – 0	Seibu Lions Stadium	2:43	32,463
2	October 27	Hanshin Tigers – 2, Seibu Lions – 1	Seibu Lions Stadium	2:55	32,593
3	October 29	Seibu Lions – 6, Hanshin Tigers – 4	Hanshin Koshien Stadium	3:16	51,355
4	October 30	Seibu Lions – 4, Hanshin Tigers – 2	Hanshin Koshien Stadium	3:08	51,554
5	October 31	Seibu Lions – 2, Hanshin Tigers – 7	Hanshin Koshien Stadium	3:14	51,430
6	November 2	Hanshin Tigers – 9, Seibu Lions – 3	Seibu Lions Stadium	3:10	32,371

== Matchups ==
=== Game 1 ===
Saturday, October 26, 1985 13:03 at Seibu Lions Stadium in Tokorozawa, Saitama Prefecture
Team	1	2	3	4	5	6	7	8	9	R	H	E
Hanshin	0	0	0	0	0	0	0	3	0	3	8	0
Seibu	0	0	0	0	0	0	0	0	0	0	6	0
Starting pitchers: HAN: Chikafusa Ikeda (0-0); SEI: Hirohisa Matsunuma (0-0); WP: Chikafusa Ikeda (1-0) LP: Hirohisa Matsunuma (0-1); Home runs: HAN: Randy Bass (1); SEI: None; Attendance: 32,463; Boxscore

=== Game 2 ===
Sunday, October 27, 1985 13:00 at Seibu Lions Stadium in Tokorozawa, Saitama Prefecture
Team	1	2	3	4	5	6	7	8	9	R	H	E
Hanshin	0	0	0	2	0	0	0	0	0	2	6	1
Seibu	0	0	1	0	0	0	0	0	0	1	6	1
Starting pitchers: HAN: Rich Gale (0-0); SEI: Naoki Takahashi (0-0); WP: Rich Gale (1-0) LP: Naoki Takahashi (0-1) Sv: Kiyooki Nakanishi (1); Home runs: HAN: Randy Bass (2); SEI: Hiromichi Ishige (1); Attendance: 32,593; Boxscore

=== Game 3 ===
Tuesday, October 29, 1985 13:01 at Hanshin Koshien Stadium in Nishinomiya, Hyōgo Prefecture
Team	1	2	3	4	5	6	7	8	9	R	H	E
Seibu	0	4	0	1	0	0	0	1	0	6	12	1
Hanshin	0	0	3	0	0	0	0	0	1	4	6	1
Starting pitchers: SEI: Kimiyasu Kudo (0-0); HAN: Yoshihiro Nakada (0-0); WP: Osamu Higashio (1-0) LP: Yoshihiro Nakada (0-1); Home runs: SEI: Hiromichi Ishige (2), Takanori Okamura (1); HAN: Randy Bass (3), Munehiko Shimada (1); Attendance: 51,355; Boxscore

=== Game 4 ===
Wednesday, October 30, 1985 13:00 at Hanshin Koshien Stadium in Nishinomiya, Hyōgo Prefecture
Team	1	2	3	4	5	6	7	8	9	R	H	E
Seibu	0	0	0	0	0	2	0	2	0	4	8	1
Hanshin	0	0	0	0	0	1	0	0	1	2	3	0
Starting pitchers: SEI: Hirohisa Matsunuma (0-1); HAN: Fumitaka Ito (0-0); WP: Tamotsu Nagai (1-0) LP: Osamu Fukuma (0-1) Sv: Osamu Higashio (1); Home runs: SEI: Steve Ontiveros (1), Yoshihiro Nishioka (1); HAN: Akinobu Mayumi (1); Attendance: 51,554; Boxscore

=== Game 5 ===
Thursday, October 31, 1985 13:00 at Hanshin Koshien Stadium in Nishinomiya, Hyōgo Prefecture
Team	1	2	3	4	5	6	7	8	9	R	H	E
Seibu	0	1	1	0	0	0	0	0	0	2	10	0
Hanshin	4	0	0	0	2	0	1	0	X	7	10	0
Starting pitchers: SEI: Kazuyuki Ono (0-0); HAN: Chikafusa Ikeda (1-0); WP: Osamu Fukuma (1-1) LP: Kazuyuki Ono (0-1); Home runs: SEI: Takuji Ota (1); HAN: Masayuki Kakefu (1), Keiichi Nagasaki (1); Attendance: 51,430; Boxscore

=== Game 6 ===
Saturday, November 2, 1985 13:02 at Seibu Lions Stadium in Tokorozawa, Saitama Prefecture
Team	1	2	3	4	5	6	7	8	9	R	H	E
Hanshin	4	1	0	0	1	0	1	0	2	9	11	0
Seibu	1	0	0	1	0	0	0	0	1	3	7	0
Starting pitchers: HAN: Rich Gale (1-0); SEI: Naoki Takahashi (0-1); WP: Rich Gale (2-0) LP: Naoki Takahashi (0-2); Home runs: HAN: Keiichi Nagasaki (2), Akinobu Mayumi (2), Masayuki Kakefu (2); SEI: Hiromichi Ishige (3); Attendance: 32,371; Boxscore

== See also ==
- 1985 World Series
- Curse of the Colonel
