= Yuki Yoshimura (baseball) =

Japanese baseball player

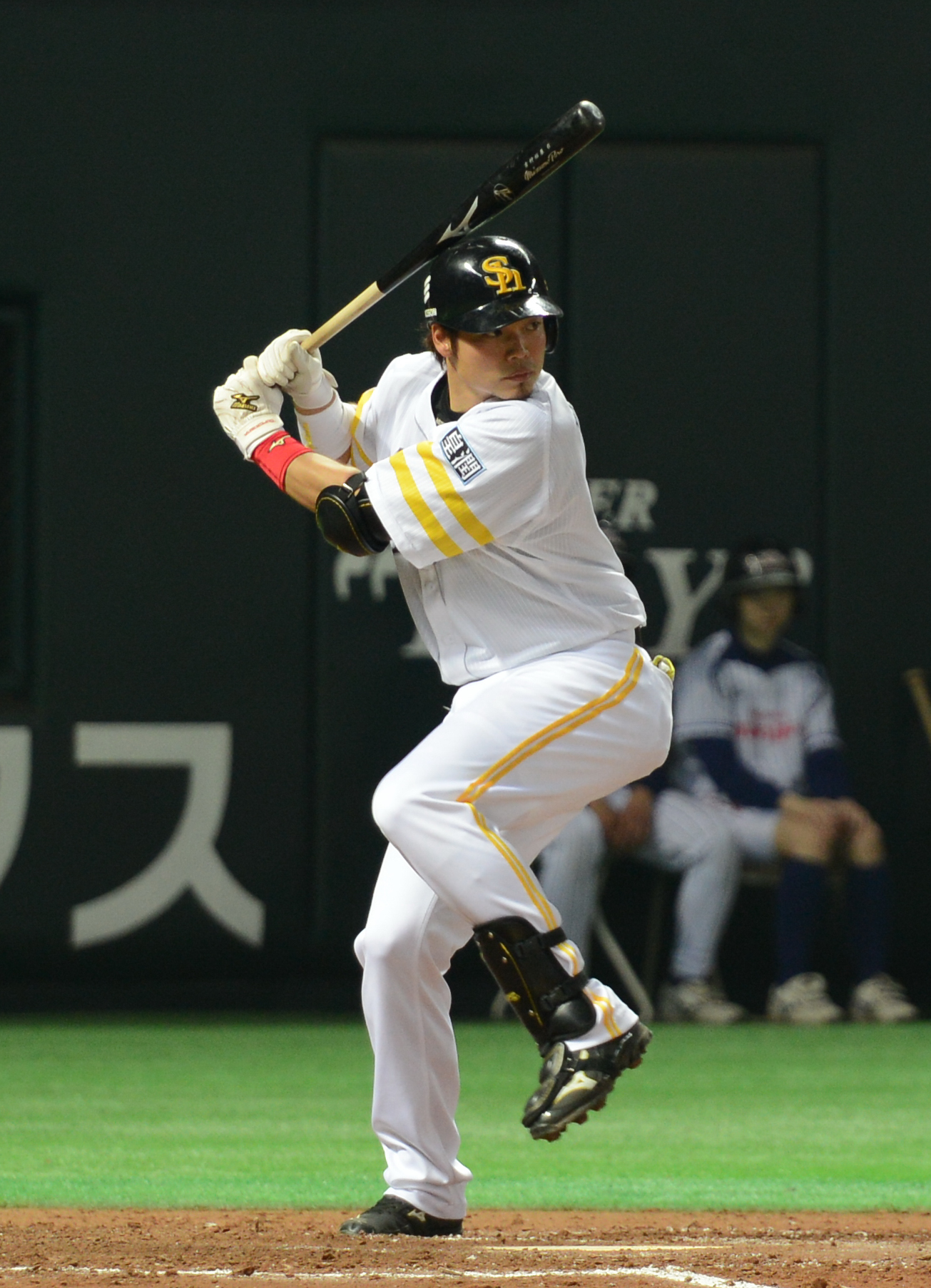
- Yoshimura with the Fukuoka SoftBank Hawks
- Outfielder / First baseman
- Born: June 14, 1984 (age 42); Koga, Fukuoka, Japan
- Bats: Right Throws: Right

NPB debut
- October 3, 2003, for the Yokohama BayStars

NPB statistics
- Batting average: .253
- Home runs: 131
- Runs batted in: 419
- Stats at Baseball Reference

Teams
- Yokohama BayStars/Yokohama DeNA BayStars (2003–2012); Fukuoka SoftBank Hawks (2013–2018)

Career highlights and awards
- 3× Japan Series Champion (2014, 2015, 2017); 2014 PLCS MVP

Yuki Yoshimura (吉村 裕基, Yoshimura Yūki; born June 14, 1984) is a Japanese former professional baseball player. He played for the Yokohama/Yokohama DeNA BayStars, and Fukuoka SoftBank Hawks of Nippon Professional Baseball (NPB) from 2003 to 2018.

On April 17, 2019, Yoshimura signed with Twins Oosterhout of the Honkbal Hoofdklasse. He hit .270 with two home runs in 32 games in the Netherlands.
