= 2014 Central League Climax Series =

First stage
Team (Wins)		Manager	Season
Hanshin Tigers (1)		Yutaka Wada	75–68–1 (.524), 7 GB
Hiroshima Toyo Carp (0)		Kenjiro Nomura	74–68–2 (.521), 7.5 GB
- Dates: October 11–12

Final stage
Team (Wins)		Manager	Season
Hanshin Tigers (4)		Yutaka Wada	75–68–1, (.524), 7 GB
Yomiuri Giants (1)		Tatsunori Hara	82–61–1 (.573), 7 GA
- Dates: October 15–18
- MVP: Seung-hwan Oh (Hanshin)

The 2014 Central League Climax Series (CLCS) consisted of two consecutive series, Stage 1 being a best-of-three series and Stage 2 being a best-of-six with the top seed being awarded a one-win advantage. The winner of the series advanced to the 2014 Japan Series, where they competed against the 2014 Pacific League Climax Series (PLCS) winner. The top three regular-season finishers played in the two series. The CLCS began with the first game of Stage 1 on October 11 and ended with the final game of Stage 2 on October 18.

== First stage ==
=== Summary ===
Hanshin Tigers won the series, 1–0–1.

Game	Date	Score	Location	Time	Attendance
1	October 11	Hiroshima Toyo Carp – 0, Hanshin Tigers – 1	Koshien Stadium	2:52	46,721
2	October 12	Hiroshima Toyo Carp – 0, Hanshin Tigers – 0 (12)	Koshien Stadium	3:35	46,815

=== Game 1 ===
Saturday, October 11, 2014, 2:02 pm (JST) at Koshien Stadium in Nishinomiya, Hyōgo Prefecture
Team	1	2	3	4	5	6	7	8	9	R	H	E
Hiroshima	0	0	0	0	0	0	0	0	0	0	4	1
Hanshin	0	0	0	0	0	1	0	0	X	1	8	0
WP: Randy Messenger (1–0) LP: Kenta Maeda (0–1) Sv: Oh Seung-hwan (1); Home runs: HIR: None; HAN: Kosuke Fukudome (1)

=== Game 2 ===
Sunday, October 12, 2014, 2:00 pm (JST) at Koshien Stadium in Nishinomiya, Hyōgo Prefecture
Team	1	2	3	4	5	6	7	8	9	10	11	12	R	H	E
Hiroshima	0	0	0	0	0	0	0	0	0	0	0	0	0	8	0
Hanshin	0	0	0	0	0	0	0	0	0	0	0	X	0	7	0

== Final stage ==
=== Summary ===
Hanshin Tigers won the series, 4–1*.

Game	Date	Score	Location	Time	Attendance
1	October 15	Hanshin Tigers – 4, Yomiuri Giants – 1	Tokyo Dome	2:59	44,871
2	October 16	Hanshin Tigers – 5, Yomiuri Giants – 2	Tokyo Dome	3:19	44,728
3	October 17	Hanshin Tigers – 4, Yomiuri Giants – 2	Tokyo Dome	3:44	46,025
4	October 18	Hanshin Tigers – 8, Yomiuri Giants – 4	Tokyo Dome	3:42	46,311

* The Central League regular season champion is given a one-game advantage in the Final Stage.

=== Game 1 ===
Wednesday, October 15, 2014, 6:00 pm (JST) at Tokyo Dome in Bunkyō, Tokyo
Team	1	2	3	4	5	6	7	8	9	R	H	E
Hanshin	3	0	1	0	0	0	0	0	0	4	9	0
Yomiuri	0	0	0	0	0	0	1	0	0	1	7	0
WP: Shintaro Fujinami (1–0) LP: Tetsuya Utsumi (0–1) Sv: Oh Seung-hwan (1); Home runs: HAN: Mauro Gómez (1); YOM: Shinnosuke Abe (1)

=== Game 2 ===
Thursday, October 16, 2014, 6:00 pm (JST) at Tokyo Dome in Bunkyō, Tokyo
Team	1	2	3	4	5	6	7	8	9	R	H	E
Hanshin	0	0	2	0	3	0	0	0	0	5	10	2
Yomiuri	0	0	0	0	0	0	2	0	0	2	7	0
WP: Minoru Iwata (1–0) LP: Hirokazu Sawamura (0–1) Sv: Oh Seung-hwan (2); Home runs: HAN: None; YOM: Hirokazu Ibata (1)

=== Game 3 ===
Friday, October 17, 2014, 6:00 pm (JST) at Tokyo Dome in Bunkyō, Tokyo
Team	1	2	3	4	5	6	7	8	9	R	H	E
Hanshin	0	0	0	0	0	2	2	0	0	4	11	0
Yomiuri	1	0	1	0	0	0	0	0	0	2	6	0
WP: Yuya Ando (1–0) LP: Tetsuya Yamaguchi (0–1) Sv: Oh Seung-hwan (3); Home runs: HAN: None; YOM: Yoshiyuki Kamei (1)

=== Game 4 ===
Saturday, October 18, 2014, 6:00 pm (JST) at Tokyo Dome in Bunkyō, Tokyo
Team	1	2	3	4	5	6	7	8	9	R	H	E
Hanshin	4	2	0	0	0	0	2	0	0	8	11	0
Yomiuri	0	1	1	0	0	0	0	0	2	4	13	0
WP: Atsushi Nomi (1–0) LP: Yuki Koyama (0–1); Home runs: HAN: Matt Murton (1), Kosuke Fukudome (1), Tsuyoshi Nishioka (1); YOM: Yoshiyuki Kamei (2), Frederich Cepeda (1), Hayato Sakamoto (1)
