= Yoshio Yoshida (baseball) =

Japanese baseball player and manager (1933–2025)

Yoshio Yoshida 吉田 義男
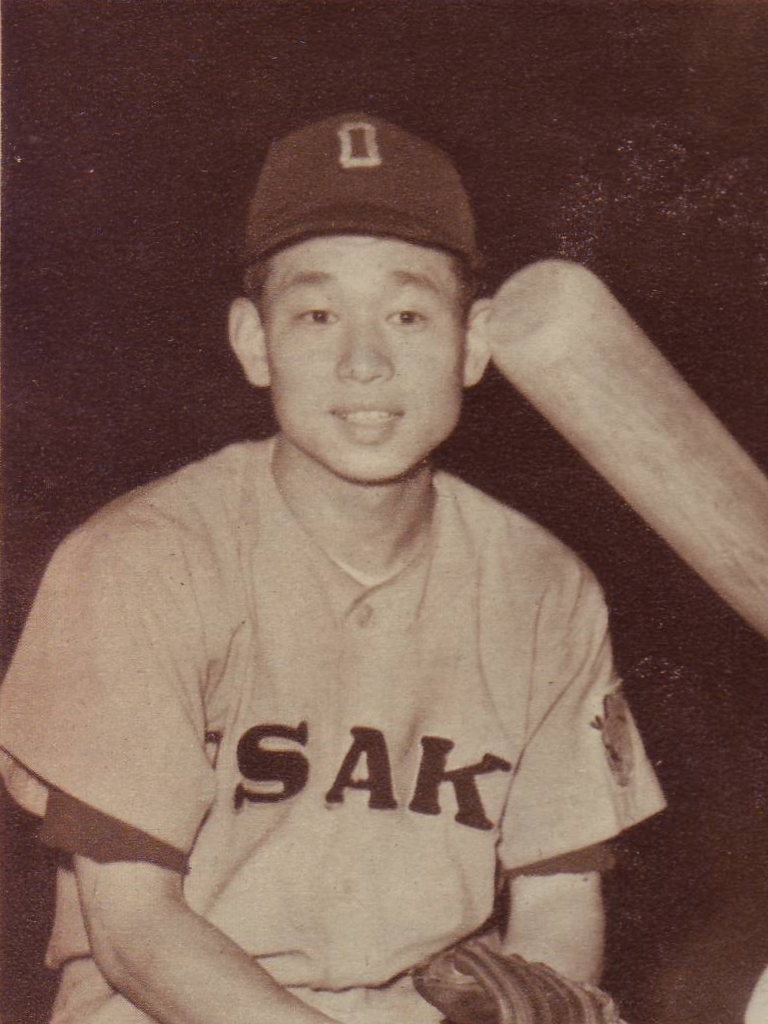
- Yoshida in 1956
- Shortstop
- Born: July 26, 1933; Kyoto, Kyoto Prefecture, Japan
- Died: February 3, 2025 (aged 91)
- Batted: Right Threw: Right

NPB debut
- March 28, 1953, for the Osaka Tigers

Last appearance
- 1969, for the Hanshin Tigers

NPB statistics
- Batting average: .267
- Hits: 1864
- Home runs: 66
- RBIs: 434
- Managerial record: 484–511–56
- Stats at Baseball Reference

Teams
- As player: Osaka Tigers/Hanshin Tigers (1953–1969); As manager: Hanshin Tigers (1969, 1975–1977, 1985–1987, 1997–1998)

Career highlights and awards
- Japan Series champion (1985); 9× Best Nine Award (1955–1960, 1962, 1964, 1965); Matsutaro Shoriki Award (1985); Hanshin Tigers #23 retired

Member of the Japanese

Baseball Hall of Fame
- Induction: 1992

Yoshio Yoshida (吉田 義男, Yoshida Yoshio; July 26, 1933 – February 3, 2025) was a Japanese professional baseball player and manager who spent his entire career with the Hanshin Tigers of Japan's Nippon Professional Baseball (NPB). His number 23 was retired by the Tigers. He worked for the Asahi Broadcasting Corporation as a live radio and television baseball commentator. Yoshida died of a stroke on February 3, 2025, at the age of 91.

== Career ==
Yoshida was famous for his steady batting and his defense at shortstop, and received the NPB Best Nine Award nine times, in 1955–60, 1962, 1964–65. He was often compared with the famous 12th century general, Minamoto no Yoshitsune, and they called Yoshida "Ushiwakamaru", Yoshitsune's name as a child.

After retirement, he became the manager of the Hanshin Tigers in three different stints (1975–1977, 1985–1987, 1997–1998). Among his eight seasons as manager, the 1985 season was his best. The Tigers won the Central League pennant championship for the first time since 1964 and defeated the Seibu Lions in the Japan Series for their first ever championship. That year Yoshida was also named the winner of the Matsutaro Shoriki Award. In eight seasons, he went 484–511 (with 56 ties).

From 1989 to 1995, Yoshida lived in Paris, and managed the French national baseball team, but his team failed to qualify for the Olympic Games twice; first for the 1992 Summer Olympics at Barcelona and again for the 1996 Summer Olympics at Atlanta; despite this, he earned the secondary nickname "Monsieur". He was selected as a member of the Japanese Baseball Hall of Fame in 1992.
