= Hirotoshi Masui =

Japanese baseball player

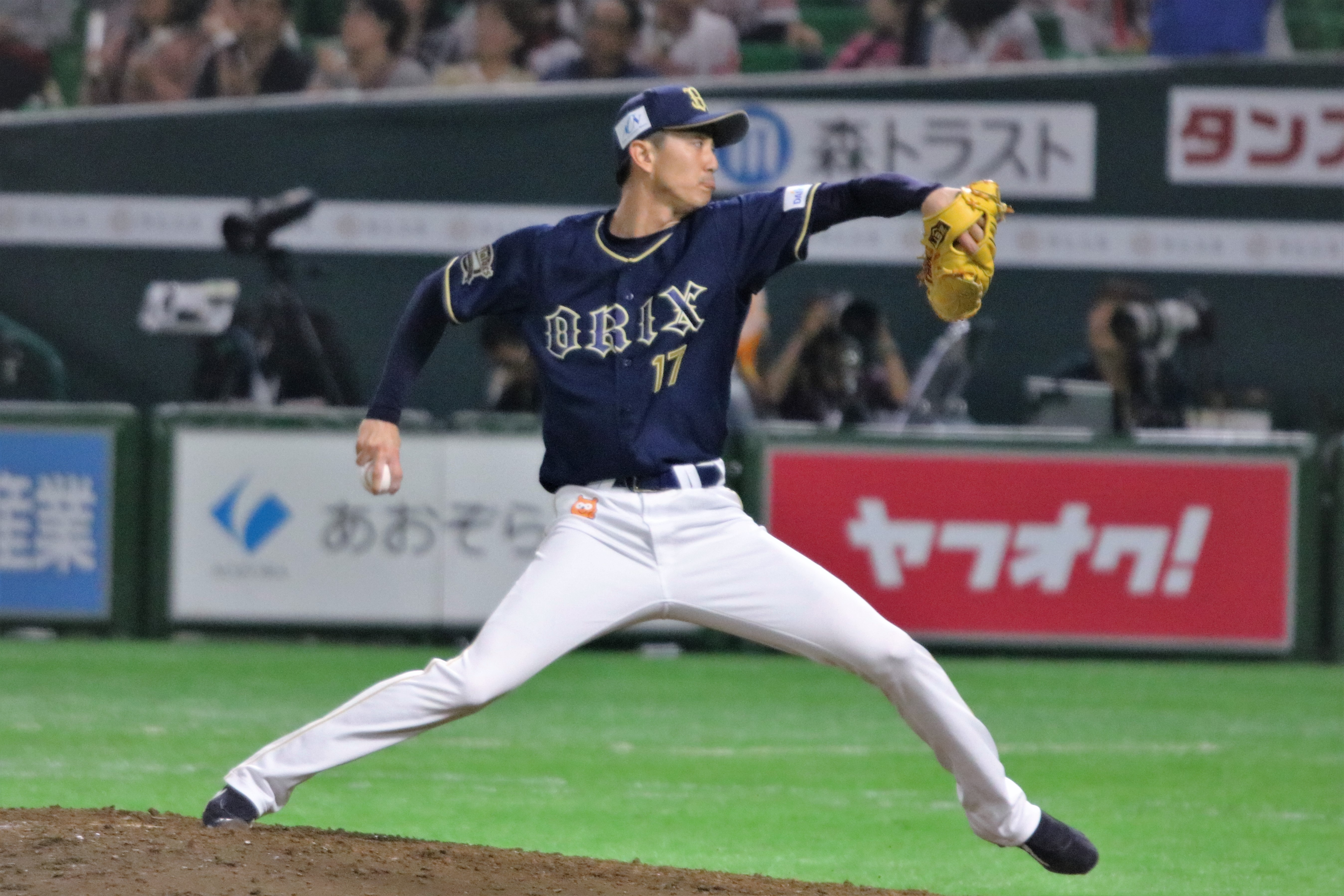
- Masui with the Orix Buffaloes

free agent
- Pitcher
- Born: June 26, 1984 (age 41)
- Bats: Right Throws: Right

NPB debut
- April 9, 2010, for the Hokkaido Nippon-Ham Fighters

Career statistics (through 2022 season)
- Win–loss record: 41-47
- ERA: 3.08
- Strikeouts: 725
- Saves: 163
- Holds: 158
- Stats at Baseball Reference

Teams
- Hokkaido Nippon-Ham Fighters (2010–2017); Orix Buffaloes (2018–2022)

Career highlights and awards
- 3× NPB All-Star (2011, 2013, 2018); Pacific League Most Valuable Setup Pitcher (2012)
Medals
Men's baseball
Representing Japan
2015 WBSC Premier12
Bronze medal – third place	2015 Tokyo	Team

Hirotoshi Masui (増井 浩俊, born June 25, 1984) is a Japanese professional baseball pitcher.

He was selected for the 2018 NPB All-Star game.

== Pitching style ==
Masui is a right-handed pitcher with an overhand delivery. As a reliever, he throws a four-seam fastball (tops out at 96 mph) and a forkball as his primary pitches.
