= Yohei Kagiya =

Japanese baseball player (born 1990)

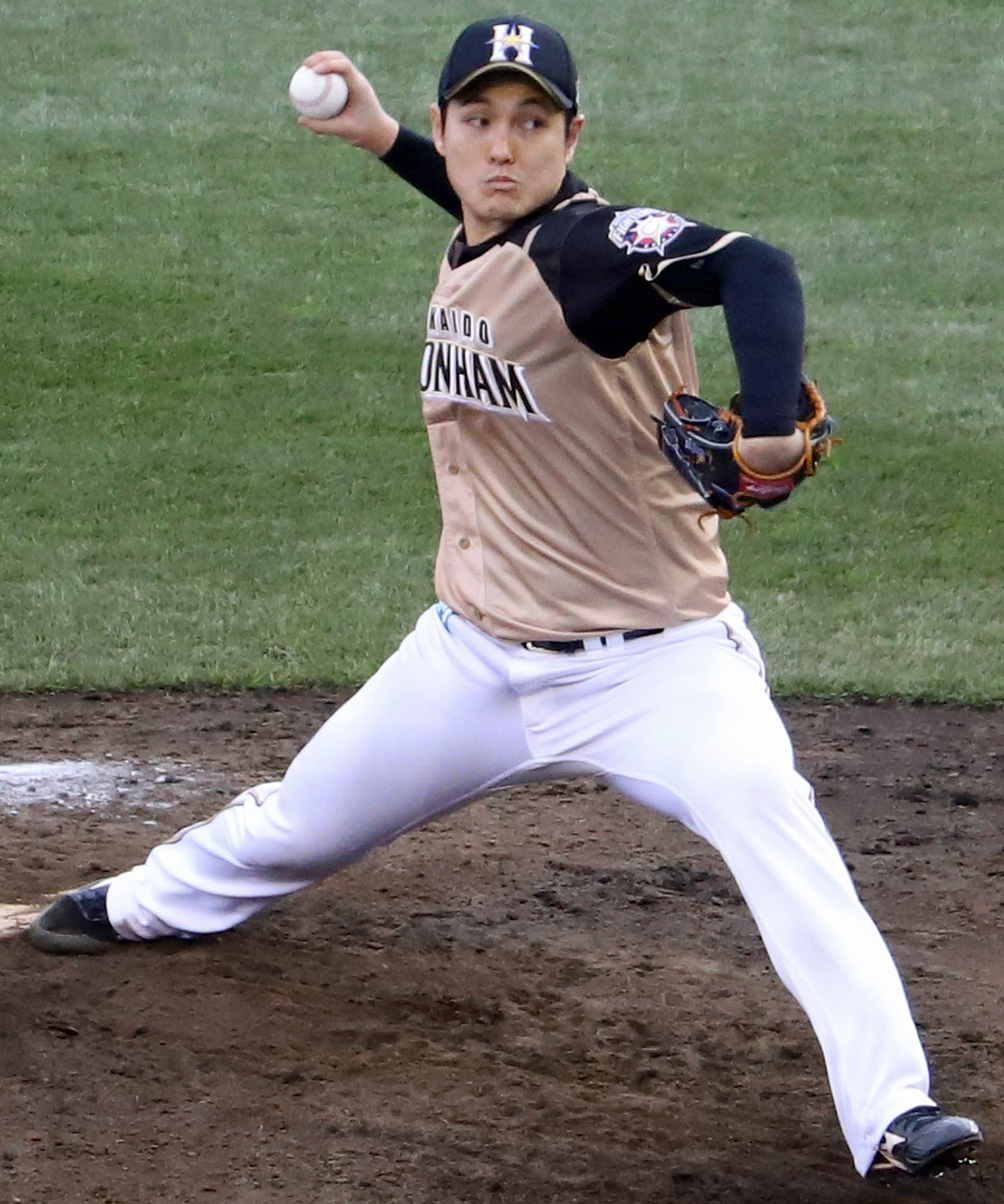
- Kagiya with the Hokkaido-Nippon Ham Fighters
- Pitcher
- Born: September 23, 1990 (age 35); Nanae, Kameda District, Hokkaido, Japan
- Batted: Right Threw: Right

NPB debut
- March 29, 2013, for the Hokkaido Nippon-Ham Fighters

Last NPB appearance
- September 25, 2024, for the Hokkaido Nippon-Ham Fighters

Career statistics
- Win–loss record: 25–15
- ERA: 3.45
- Strikeouts: 324
- Stats at Baseball Reference

Teams
- Hokkaido Nippon-Ham Fighters (2013–2019); Yomiuri Giants (2019–2023); Hokkaido Nippon-Ham Fighters (2024)

Yohei Kagiya (鍵谷 陽平, Kagiya Yōhei) (born September 9, 1990) is a Japanese former professional baseball pitcher. He played in Nippon Professional Baseball (NPB) for the Hokkaido Nippon-Ham Fighters and Yomiuri Giants. He debuted in 2013 for the Fighters.

== Career ==
Kagiya was drafted by the Hokkaido Nippon-Ham Fighters in the 3rd round of the 2012 Nippon Professional Baseball draft. On September 5, 2024, Kagiya announced he would be retiring following the conclusion of the 2024 season.
