= Akinobu Mayumi =

Japanese baseball player and manager (born 1953)

Akinobu Mayumi 真弓 明信
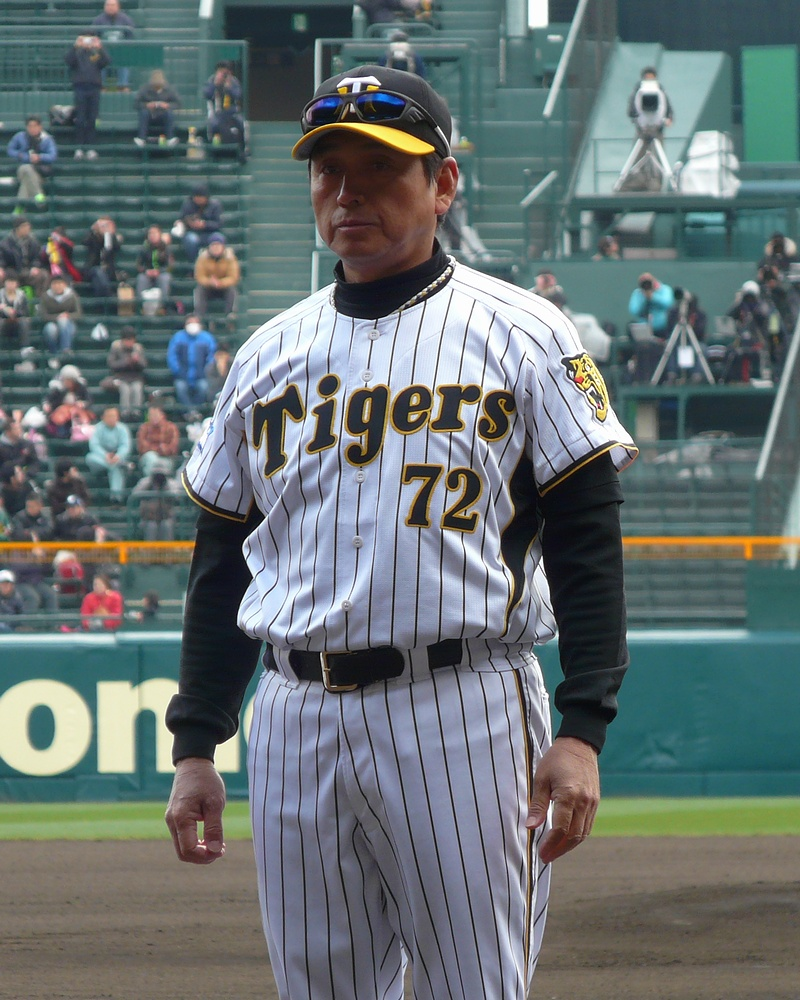
- outfielder, shortstop, second baseman
- Born: July 12, 1953 (age 72); Ōmuta, Fukuoka, Japan
- Batted: Right Threw: Right

NPB debut
- May 5, 1973, for the Taiheiyo Club Lions

Last appearance
- 1995, for the Hanshin Tigers

NPB statistics
- Batting average: .285
- Hits: 1888
- Home runs: 292
- RBIs: 886
- Stats at Baseball Reference

Managerial statistics
- Wins: 213
- Losses: 206

Teams
- As player: Taiheiyo Club Lions / Crown Lighter Lions (1973–1978); Hanshin Tigers (1979–1995); As coach: Osaka Kintetsu Buffaloes (2000–2004); As manager: Hanshin Tigers (2009–2011)

Career highlights and awards
- Central League batting champion (1983); Japan Series champion (1985)

Akinobu Mayumi (真弓 明信, Mayumi Akinobu; born July 12, 1953) is the former manager for the Hanshin Tigers baseball team in Japan's Nippon Professional Baseball. After serving 3 seasons (2009–2011) with the team, he was released in October after failing to make the 2011 play-offs. He was shortly replaced with by Yutaka Wada, who had also previously played for the team during his baseball career.

Mayumi had been a star player for the Tigers during his playing days. He was part of the Tigers' team that won the 1985 Japan Series, and hit a home run in the series. Before playing for the Tigers, he was drafted by the Taiheiyo Lions and played for them, as well as a minor-league stint with the Lodi Orioles of the California League as part of a development program piloted by the Lions in the 1970s.
