= Curse of the Colonel =

1985 Japanese urban legend

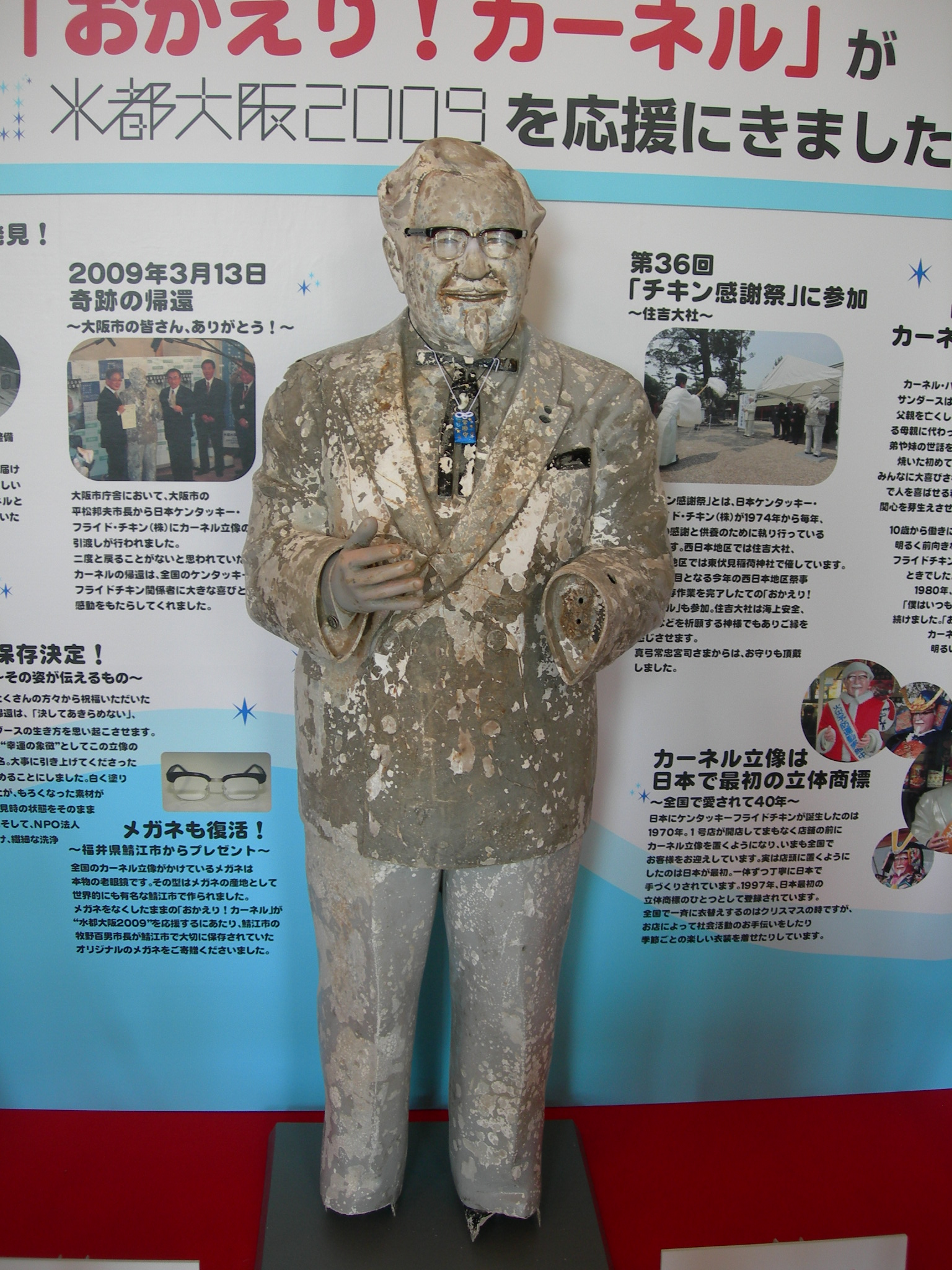
The statue following its 2009 recovery from the river. Visible around the statue's neck is an Omamori, a traditional Japanese amulet.

The Curse of the Colonel or alternatively the Curse of Colonel Sanders (Japanese: カーネルサンダースの呪い, romanisation: Kāneru Sandāsu no Noroi) is a Japanese urban legend that held that the ghost of the KFC founder, Colonel Sanders, placed a curse on the Hanshin Tigers baseball team.

The curse was said to be placed on the team because of the Colonel's anger over treatment of one of his store-front statues, which was thrown into the Dōtonbori River by Hanshin fans before their team's 1985 Central League pennant. As is common with sports curses, the Curse of the Colonel was used to explain the team's failures in subsequent years. Some fans believed the team would never win another Japan Series until the statue was recovered. They appeared in the Japan Series three more times and lost in 2003, 2005 and 2014 before winning in 2023.

Comparisons are often made between the Hanshin Tigers and the Boston Red Sox, who were said to be under the Curse of the Bambino until they won the World Series in 2004. The Curse of the Colonel has also been used as a bogeyman threat to those who would divulge the KFC recipe.

== History ==
=== 1985 Japan Series ===
The Hanshin Tigers are located in Kansai, the second-largest metropolitan area in Japan. They are considered the underdogs of Nippon Professional Baseball, in opposition to the Yomiuri Giants of Tokyo, who are considered the kings. The fans flock to the stadium no matter how badly the Tigers play.

In 1985, the Hanshin Tigers faced the Seibu Lions and had a surprise first victory in the Japan Series, largely due to the efforts of their star slugger, the American Randy Bass. A riotous celebration gathered at Ebisu Bridge in Dōtonbori, Osaka, on October 16, three weeks before the Japan Series. Supporters yelled the players' names; with every name, a fan resembling a member of the team leaped into the canal. Lacking a Caucasian person to imitate Bass, the crowd seized a plastic statue of Colonel Sanders from a KFC and tossed it off the bridge as an effigy. Like Bass, the Colonel had a beard and was not Japanese.

According to the urban legend, this began the Curse of the Colonel, which stated that the Tigers would not win the championship again until the statue is recovered.

=== 18-year losing streak ===
After their success in the 1985 series, the Hanshin Tigers began an 18-year losing streak placing last or next-to-last in the league. Brief rallies in 1992 and 1999 brought hope to fans, but they were followed with defeat. Numerous attempts to recover the statue failed, including the use of divers and dredging. Fans apologized to the store manager.

=== 2002 World Cup ===
Although the leap into Dōtonbori canal and the Curse of the Colonel is usually associated only with a Hanshin Tigers victory, in 2002, when Japan beat Tunisia in the World Cup, some 500 fans jumped into the canal as a celebration, in spite of heavy police security. A Colonel Sanders statue was taken from the storefront of a KFC in Kobe and its hands were cut off, supposedly in imitation of Sharia law.

=== 2003 Central League ===
In 2003, the Tigers had an unexpectedly strong season. Their chief rivals, the Yomiuri Giants, lost their star player Hideki Matsui to the New York Yankees, while the Tigers saw the return of pitcher Hideki Irabu to NPB after playing with the Texas Rangers. The Tigers won the Central League to qualify for the Japan Series, and many newspapers speculated that the Curse of the Colonel had finally been broken. However, the Tigers lost the Japan Series to the Fukuoka Daiei Hawks, so the curse remained intact.

Fans were enthusiastic about winning the Central League, and repeated the celebratory leap into Dōtonbori Canal. However, instead of the individual leapers representing the players, over 5,300 fans plunged into the canal.

Many KFC outlets in Kobe and Osaka moved their Colonel Sanders statues inside until the series was over to protect them from rabid Tigers fans. The replacement Colonel Sanders statue in the Dōtonbori KFC branch was bolted down to prevent a repeat of the incident.

==== Death in the canal ====
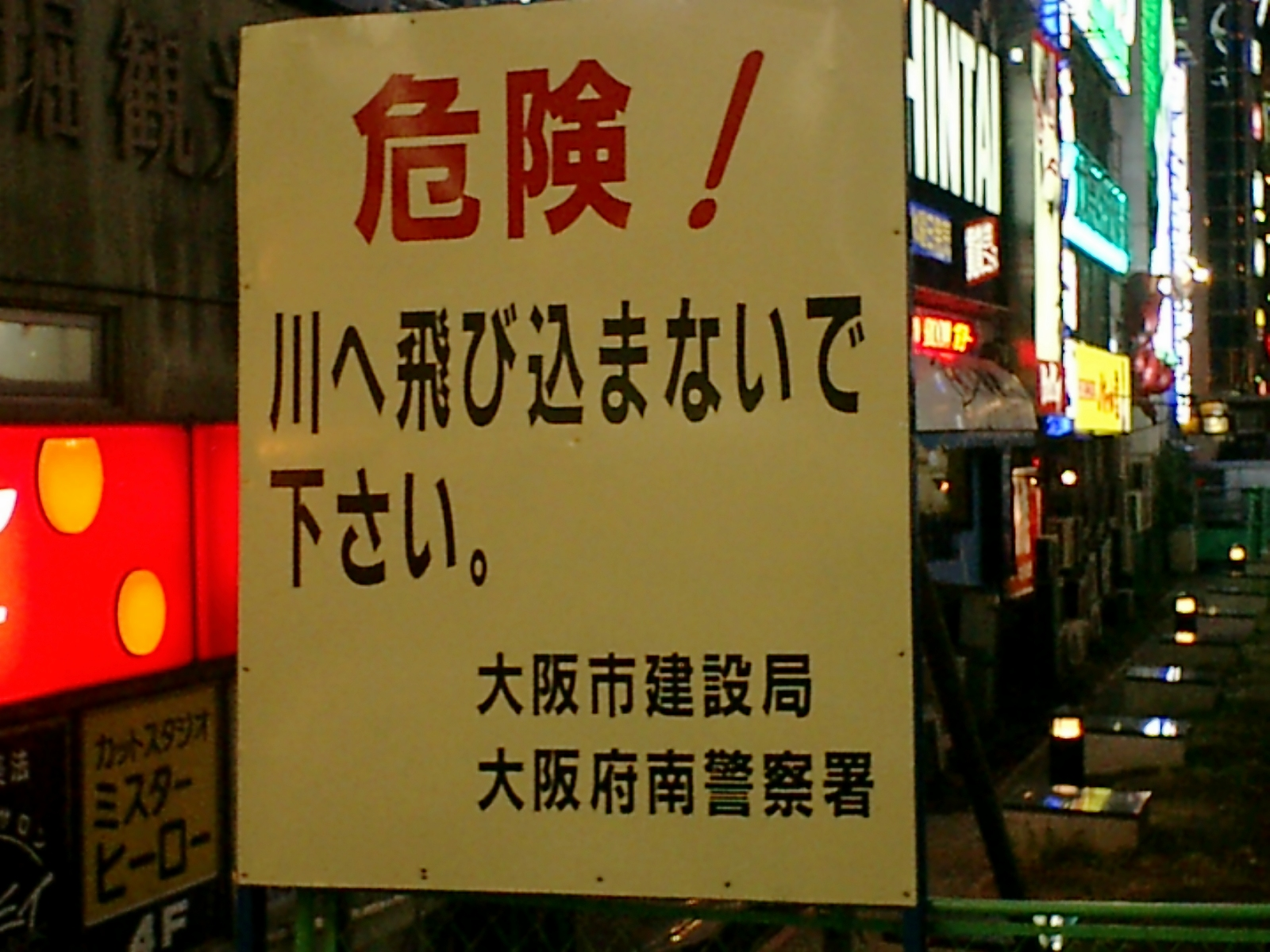
"Dangerous! Do not dive into this river. Osaka Regional Development Bureau and Osaka-Minami Police station" sign at Ebisubashi bridge

24-year-old Hanshin Tigers fan Masaya Shitababa drowned in the canal during the 2003 celebration, with all reports being that he had been shoved in by the revelers. To prevent future incidents, the Osaka city council ordered the construction of a new Ebisubashi bridge beginning in 2004, which will make it more difficult for fans to take the celebratory leap should the Curse of the Colonel be broken and the Tigers win again.

=== Recovery of statue ===
The Colonel was finally discovered in the Dōtonbori River on March 10, 2009. Divers who recovered the statue at first thought it was only a large barrel, and shortly after a human corpse, but Hanshin fans on the scene were quick to identify it as the upper body of the long-lost Colonel. The right hand and lower body were found the next day, but the statue is still missing its glasses and left hand. It was said that the only way the curse could be lifted was by returning his long-lost glasses and left hand.

The statue was later recovered (with replacement of new glasses and hand) and returned to KFC Japan. The KFC restaurant that the statue originally belonged to no longer exists, but a cardboard cut-out replica of the statue was placed in the branch near Koshien Stadium during the 2023 playoff run.

=== 2023 Japan Series ===
The curse was broken in 2023 when the Tigers won Game 7 of the 2023 Japan Series for their first NPB championship since 1985. Fans again gathered and celebrated in Dōtonbori after the 2023 title win and threw a fan cosplaying as the Colonel into the river in reference to the curse.

On March 8, 2024, KFC Japan held a burial ceremony for the statue, citing difficulties in maintaining the statue's condition.

== See also ==
- KFC in Japan
- Baseball superstition
- Curse of the Billy Goat – A similar superstition surrounding the Chicago Cubs (American baseball, ended in 2016)
- Curse of the Bambino - A similar superstition surrounding the Boston Red Sox (American baseball, ended 2004)
- Curse of the Black Sox – A similar superstition surrounding the Chicago White Sox (American baseball, ended in 2005)
- Curse of Rocky Colavito – A similar superstition surrounding the Cleveland Indians (currently Guardians) (American baseball, ongoing)
- Curse of Coogan's Bluff – A similar superstition surrounding the San Francisco Giants (American baseball, ended in 2010)
- 2025 World Series – A series in which a Colonel Sanders actor sat behind home plate, initially thought by some to be a reference to the Curse of the Colonel
