= Hiroshi Moriwaki =

Japanese baseball player and coach (born 1960)

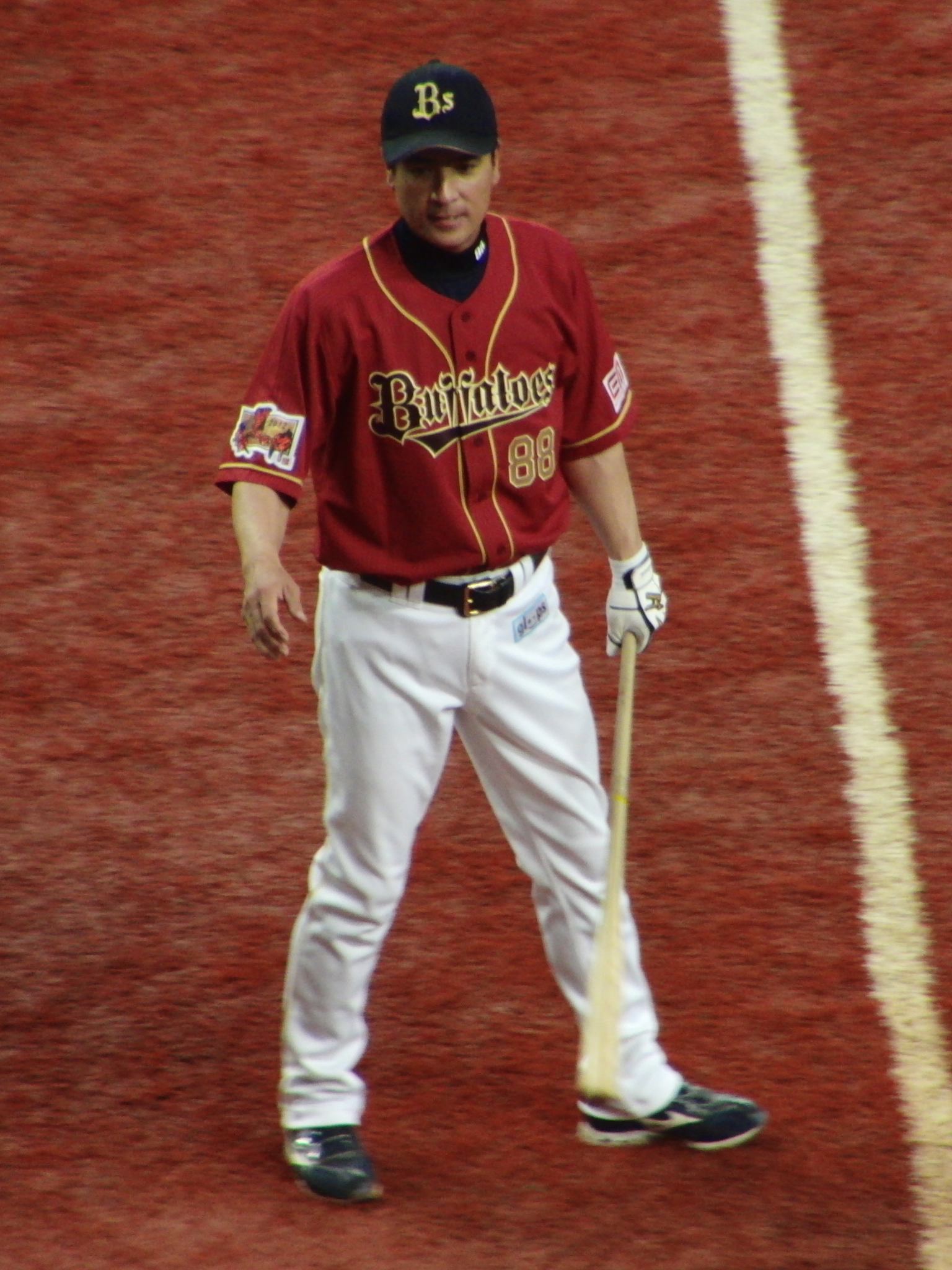
- Infielder / Manager / Coach
- Born: August 6, 1960 (age 65); Taka District, Hyōgo, Japan
- Batted: Right Threw: Right

NPB debut
- April 15, 1981, for the Kintetsu Buffaloes

Last NPB appearance
- June 4, 1995, for the Fukuoka Daiei Hawks

Career statistics
- Batting average: .223
- Home runs: 14
- Hits: 244
- Stats at Baseball Reference

Teams
- As player: Kintetsu Buffaloes (1979–1983); Hiroshima Toyo Carp (1984–1987); Nankai Hawks/Fukuoka Daiei Hawks (1987–1996); As manager: Orix Buffaloes (2013–2015); As coach: Fukuoka Daiei Hawks/Fukuoka SoftBank Hawks (1997–2009); Yomiuri Giants (2011); Orix Buffaloes (2012); Chunichi Dragons (2017–2018); Chiba Lotte Marines (2021-2022)

Hiroshi Moriwaki (森脇 浩司, Moriwaki Hiroshi; born August 6, 1960) is a former Japanese Nippon Professional Baseball player and current coach.
