= Yutaka Wada =

Japanese baseball player (born 1962)

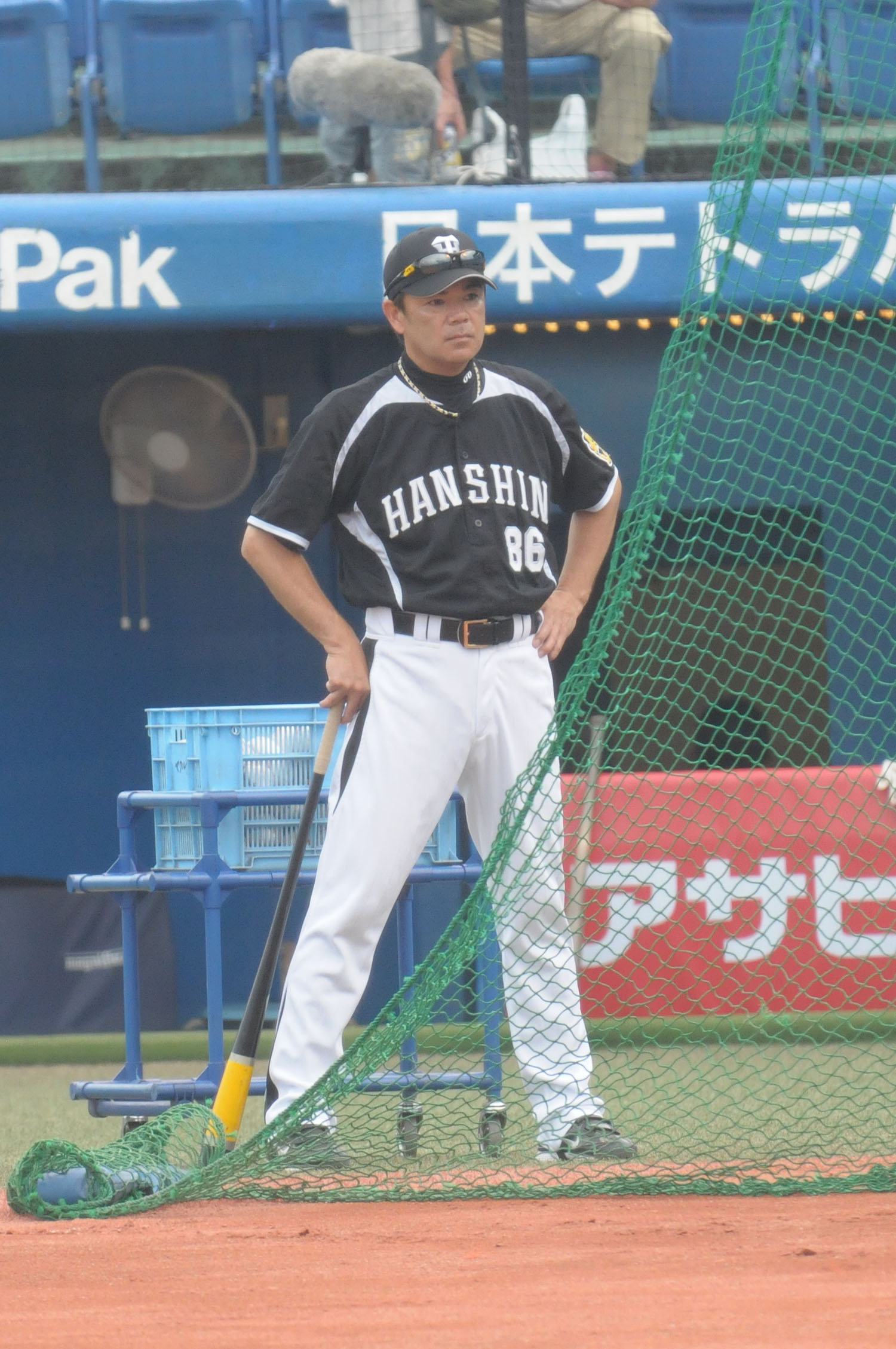
- Wada with the Hanshin Tigers

Hanshin Tigers – No. 86
- Infielder / Manager
- Born: September 2, 1962 (age 63); Matsudo, Chiba, Japan
- Batted: Right Threw: Right

NPB debut
- July 11, 1985, for the Hanshin Tigers

Last NPB appearance
- October 1, 2001, for the Hanshin Tigers

NPB statistics
- Batting average: .291
- Hits: 1,739
- Runs batted in: 407
- Stolen Bases: 94
- Home runs: 29
- Stats at Baseball Reference

Managerial statistics
- Wins: 55
- Losses: 75

Teams
- As player: Hanshin Tigers (1985–2001); As manager: Hanshin Tigers (2012–2015); As coach: Hanshin Tigers (2001–2011, 2023-present)

Career highlights and awards
- 2× Central League Best Nine Award (1992, 1994); 3× Central League Golden Glove Award (1992–1994); 7× NPB All-Star (1989, 1992–1996, 1999)
Medals
Men's baseball
Gold medal – first place	1984 Los Angeles	Team competition

Yutaka Wada (和田 豊; born September 2, 1962 in Matsudo, Chiba, Japan) is a retired Japanese baseball player for the Hanshin Tigers. He previously worked as a hitting coach for the Hanshin Tigers prior to the 2012 season. After the team failed to make the 2011 play-offs, team manager Akinobu Mayumi was fired, and Yutaka Wada was giving the position to replace him less than a week later. He is notable for various accomplishments, which include the following:

- 1500 games played
- 1500 hits
- 24 game hitting streak from opening game (1997)
- 3 straight seasons with playing every game
- Golden Glove (2nd baseman)
- All star player (1989, 1992–1996, 1999)

== Career statistics ==
Season	Team	G	AB	R	H	HR	RBI	BB/HP	SO	SB	SH	E	AVG
1985	HT	39	49	10	14	0	2	5	3	0	0	2	.286
1986	HT	8	3	0	1	0	0	0	0	0	2	0	.333
1987	HT	54	53	8	13	1	2	3	9	3	3	1	.245
1988	HT	127	398	57	111	1	20	38	51	17	57	7	.279
1989	HT	129	476	61	141	1	25	46	39	18	41	5	.296
1990	HT	126	496	72	151	8	36	58	59	17	15	9	.304
1991	HT	129	494	50	147	0	34	59	48	9	12	11	.298
1992	HT	132	550	65	153	0	23	41	48	1	15	6	.278
1993	HT	127	511	63	161	0	36	48	35	4	20	2	.315
1994	HT	130	519	76	165	2	43	68	40	8	14	8	.318
1995	HT	130	509	49	136	1	35	48	39	4	12	7	.267
1996	HT	130	520	66	155	5	44	43	48	2	10	7	.298
1997	HT	96	390	51	117	2	26	29	44	2	4	5	.300
1998	HT	130	438	39	119	4	32	46	39	1	11	7	.272
1999	HT	101	334	30	101	3	23	34	29	4	11	2	.302
2000	HT	88	194	19	49	1	20	28	16	3	6	4	.253
2001	HT	37	38	4	5	0	2	6	7	0	0	0	.132
Total		1713	5972	720	1739	29	403	600	554	114	212	83	.291
