= 1985 Nippon Professional Baseball season =

1985 NPB season
- League: Nippon Professional Baseball
- Sport: Baseball

Regular season
- Season MVP: CL: Randy Bass (HAN); PL: Hiromitsu Ochiai (LOT)

League postseason
- CL champions: Hanshin Tigers
- CL runners-up: Hiroshima Toyo Carp
- PL champions: Seibu Lions
- PL runners-up: Lotte Orions

Japan Series
- Champions: Hanshin Tigers
- Runners-up: Seibu Lions
- Finals MVP: Randy Bass (HAN)

NPB seasons
- ← 1984 1986 →

The 1985 Nippon Professional Baseball season was the 36th season of operation for the league.

== Regular season standings ==
=== Central League ===
Central League	G	W	L	T	Pct.	GB
Hanshin Tigers	130	74	49	7	.602	--
Hiroshima Toyo Carp	130	68	57	5	.544	7.0
Yomiuri Giants	130	61	60	9	.504	12.0
Yokohama Taiyo Whales	130	57	61	12	.483	14.5
Chunichi Dragons	130	56	61	13	.479	15.0
Yakult Swallows	130	46	74	10	.383	26.5

=== Pacific League ===
Pacific League	G	W	L	T	Pct.	GB
Seibu Lions	130	79	45	6	.637	--
Lotte Orions	130	64	60	6	.516	15.0
Kintetsu Buffaloes	130	63	60	7	.5121	15.5
Hankyu Braves	130	64	61	5	.5120	15.5
Nippon-Ham Fighters	130	53	65	12	.449	23.0
Nankai Hawks	130	44	76	10	.367	33.0

== Japan Series ==
Hanshin Tigers won the series 4-2.

Game	Score	Date	Location	Attendance
1	Lions – 0, Tigers – 3	October 26	Seibu Lions Stadium	32,463
2	Lions – 1, Tigers – 2	October 27	Seibu Lions Stadium	32,593
3	Tigers – 4, Lions – 6	October 29	Hanshin Koshien Stadium	51,355
4	Tigers – 2, Lions – 4	October 30	Hanshin Koshien Stadium	51,554
5	Tigers – 7, Lions – 2	October 31	Hanshin Koshien Stadium	51,430
6	Lions – 3, Tigers – 9	November 2	Seibu Lions Stadium	32,371

== See also ==
- 1985 Major League Baseball season
