= Yamato Maeda =

Japanese baseball player (born 1987)

Yamato (Yamato Maeda)
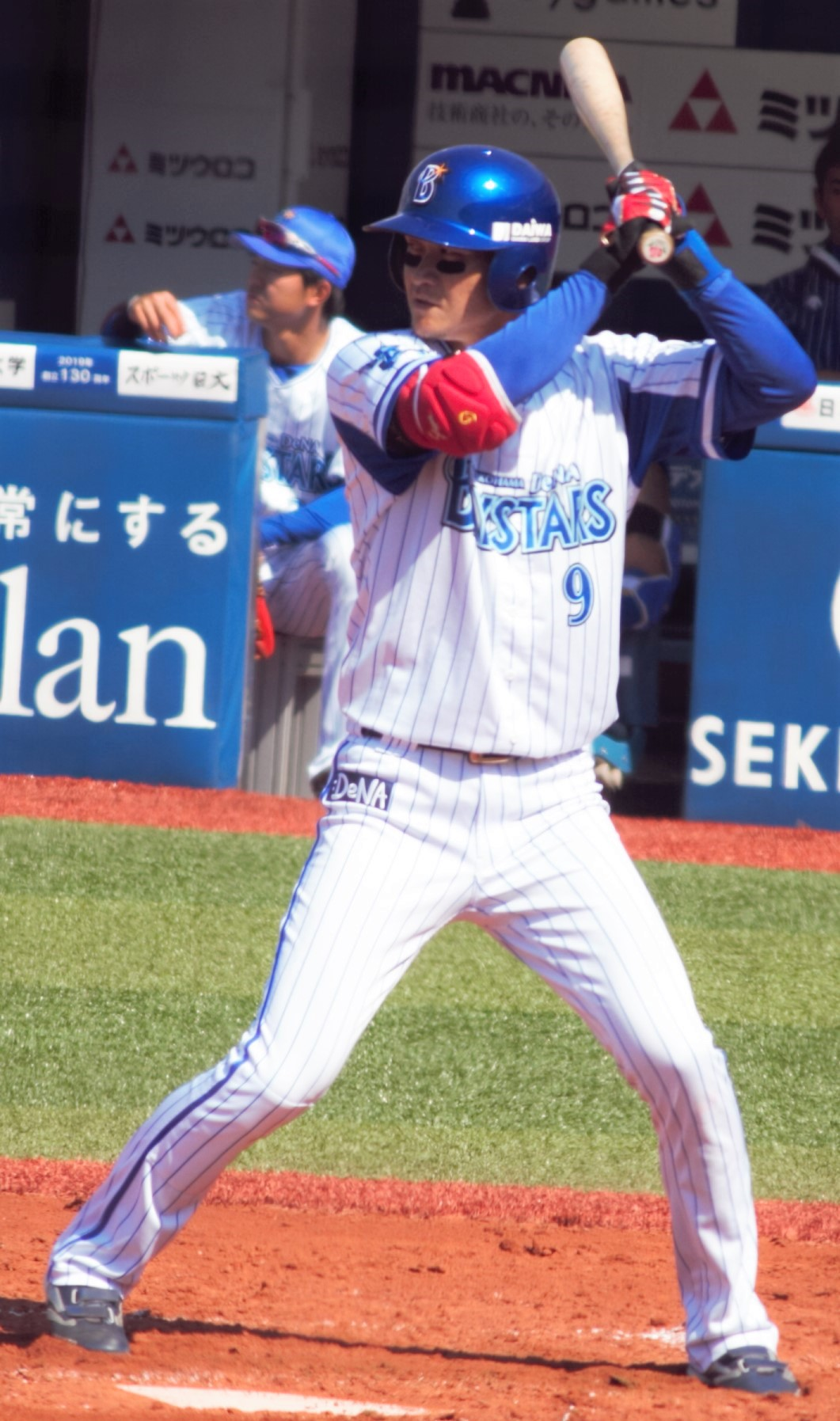
- Yamato with the Yokohama DeNA BayStars
- Infielder
- Born: November 5, 1987 (age 38)
- Batted: Right Threw: Right

NPB debut
- April 15, 2009, for the Hanshin Tigers

Last NPB appearance
- September 7, 2024, for the Yokohama DeNA BayStars

NPB statistics
- Batting average: .251
- Home runs: 12
- RBI: 282
- Stats at Baseball Reference

Teams
- Hanshin Tigers (2006–2017); Yokohama DeNA BayStars (2018–2024)

Yamato Maeda (前田 大和, Maeda Yamato; born November 5, 1987 in Kanoya, Kagoshima) is a Japanese professional baseball outfielder for the Yokohama DeNA BayStars in Japan's Nippon Professional Baseball. He has been registered as "Yamato" (大和) since 2007.

== Early baseball career ==
He played for the Kanoya Boy Scout's softball club in his early years, then joined the Kanoya Baystars during junior high. He entered Shonan High School and joined its baseball club as a shortstop, and participated in the Summer Koshien during his 1st and 3rd year, reaching the quarter final round in the latter. During that time, his impressive defense caught the attention of Tigers manager Akinobu Okada who was watching the televised game, that prompted him to choose Yamato as the Tiger's 4th pick in the 2005 high school draft.

== Hanshin Tigers ==
2010

He participated in 62 official games for the season, and also appeared in his first hero interview. Although he was officially registered as an infielder, he played 4 games as a centerfielder. When he joined the Miyazaki Phoenix League during postseason, he expressed his wish to be trained further as an outfielder.

His jersey number was changed from 66 to 0 during the offseason.

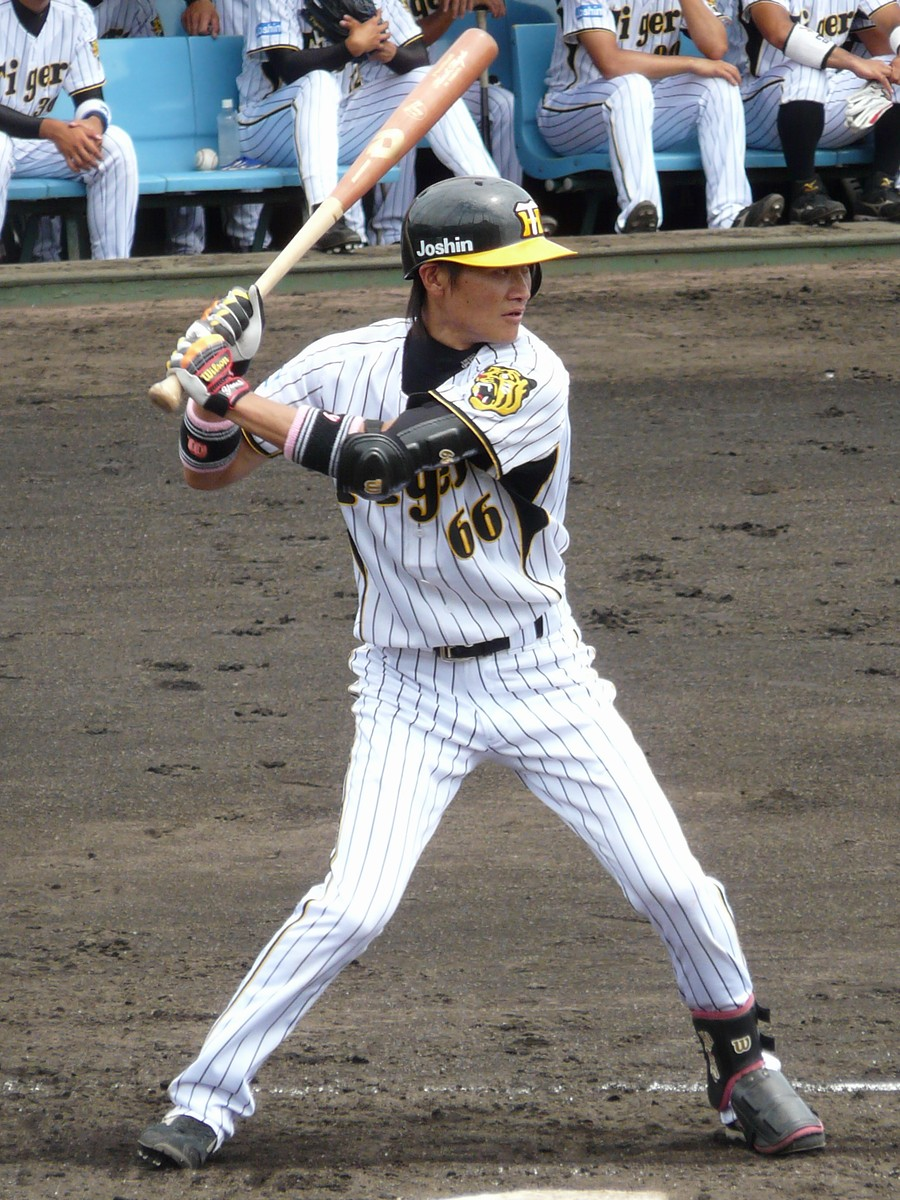
Koshien Stadium, July 2009

2011

He started the season as part of the first squad, but was taken off the register when he hurt his left shoulder during a ni-gun game in early May. His first official appearance was during the August 7 game with the Swallows, where he was assigned as first baseman. For the rest of the season, he alternated as right fielder and third baseman, mostly for defensive purposes.

2012

Even though he was registered as an infielder, he appeared in games as center fielder from the beginning of the season. He often batted in 2nd position in games against left-handed pitchers, as he performed better at his at-bats during those games. For the second half of the season, Manager Wada opted for speed in his lead-off hitters by appointing Hiroki Uemoto as 1st, and Yamato as second.

This is Yamato's first season to play in more than a hundred games (128), batting in 80 hits and 26 runs at an average of .257.

2013

Throughout the year, he was fixed as the 2nd batter and center fielder. Together with Tsuyoshi Nishioka who just joined the team, became the teams lead-off hitters and often displayed extensive defense in the outfield. During the mid-season interleague, he hit a brief slump and was briefly demoted in the batting line up. During the June 1 match with the Buffaloes however, he delivered consecutive hits from Chihiro Kaneko in 3 at-bats.

One of his more memorable matches for the season was on the June 29 match with the Carps at Koshien, where his parents, who came all the way from his hometown to watch, were also in attendance. On the 4th inning, he reached base on a walk, stole second, and scored on a single to center by Matt Murton. Down one run in the 5th, with runners on first and third and one out, he laid down a squeeze bunt hit to tie the game at three. In the 9th inning, with runners on first and second and two out, he hit a walk-off double to left and the Tigers won the game. He was awarded the Sixth Georgia Spirit Award for 2013 for his performance on this game during offseason.

He was however taken off the active roster when his right hand got fractured by a wild pitch from Baystars' Atori Ota on August 20. He returned in time for the 2nd game of the Climax Series first stage match with the Carps on October 13, but the Tigers were not able to advance any further after two consecutive defeats. Due to his injury, he had fewer appearances for the season (104 games), but he nevertheless recorded a higher batting average of .273.

On October 19, he announced his plan to marry 25-year-old freelance reporter Mariko Hara.

2014

His registration was finally changed to outfielder at the start of the 2014 season, and booked the day-to-day job at the centerfield and as 2nd batter. On May 5 however, following the injury of Nishioka and Uemoto in separate occasions, he was assigned to take charge of 2nd base for the first time in two years, while Shunsuke manned the outfield.

On the May 14 game against the Carps, he hit his first career home-run on his 2nd at-bat for the game, and his 1172th career at-bat, 9 years after joining the Tigers. He was not able to get the commemorative home-run ball he hit on that same day, but got it on the day after. He was not sure exactly how it got to him, but he managed to thank the fan who caught it by giving him one of his bats.

He strained his left abdominal oblique during pre-game fielding practice on July 25, and was taken off the active roster for 26 days. He made a successful comeback as a pinch runner for Fukudome on the August 19 game against the Dragons, where he managed to steal 3rd base. On September 29, he notched his 50th sac hit of the season and joined Yutaka Wada (56 in 1988) and Keiichi Hirano (59 in 2010) as the only players in franchise history to record 50 or more sac hits in one season.

Since 2012, he has been recording a fielding percentage of above 99%, and this year was the highest at 99.6%, with only one error to his name. He put on a fielding clinic during the October Climax and Japan Series, chasing and catching the most difficult of hits with remarkable speed and agility, earning him his first ever Golden Glove Award during off-season.

== Playing Style ==
Even in his rookie years, Hanshin coaches placed high regard in his fielding skills, and were even quoted that he can qualify for the first squad based on defense alone. In terms of offense, however, his body's slight build didn't allow for much hitting power, as evidenced by his low batting average of .177 in 2009. Nevertheless, he showed growth in the following years and improved both his batting and slugging percentages.

During his at-bats, he achieved more productive hitting against left-handed pitchers. From 2010 to 2011, whenever Chunichi Dragons lefty Wei-Yin Chen was scheduled to start, Yamato was always included in the Tiger's starting line-up because he delivered more hits during those games. On the other hand, he didn't fare quite as well with right-handed pitchers.

In terms of bunting, he showed considerable talent early on by hitting the most sac bunts for 2 straight years in ni-gun. But he wasn't able to repeat his success when he began appearing in official games as 2nd batter, and at times, even incurred injuries during his attempts to bunt. But through sheer persistence, he improved his bunt success rate to 96% in 2014, leading the league with 50 sac hits. His speed also allowed him to record double digit stolen bases since 2012.
