= Uemoto =

Uemoto (written: 上本) is a Japanese surname. Notable people with the surname include:

- Hiroki Uemoto (上本 博紀, born 1986), Japanese baseball player
- Taikai Uemoto (上本 大海, born 1982), Japanese footballer
- Takashi Uemoto (上本 崇司, born 1990), Japanese baseball player
- Tatsuyuki Uemoto (上本 達之, born 1980), Japanese baseball player
