= Matsuki =

Matsuki (written: 松木 or 松来) is a Japanese surname. Notable people with the surname include:

- Kenjiro Matsuki (松木 謙治郎, 1909–1986), Japanese baseball player and manager
- Kenko Matsuki (松木 謙公, born 1959), Japanese politician
- Miyu Matsuki (松来 未祐, 1977-2015), Japanese voice actress
- Samizu Matsuki (born 1936), Japanese artist and educator
- Tatsuyu Matsuki (松木 達裕, 1961–2015), original name Zhao Dayu, China-born Japanese footballer and manager
- Yasutaro Matsuki (松木 安太郎, born 1957), Japanese footballer and manager

Matsuki (written: 松記) is also a masculine Japanese given name. Notable people with the name include:

- Matsuki Miyazaki (宮崎 松記, 1900–1972), Japanese physician

== See also ==
- 8693 Matsuki, a main-belt asteroid
