= Daily Sports =

Daily Sports may refer to:

- Daily Sports (Japanese newspaper)
- Ilgan Sports (lit. Daily Sports), a South Korean newspaper

== See also ==
- Daily Sport, a 1991–2011 British tabloid
