= Shuta Tanaka =

Japanese baseball player (born 1977)

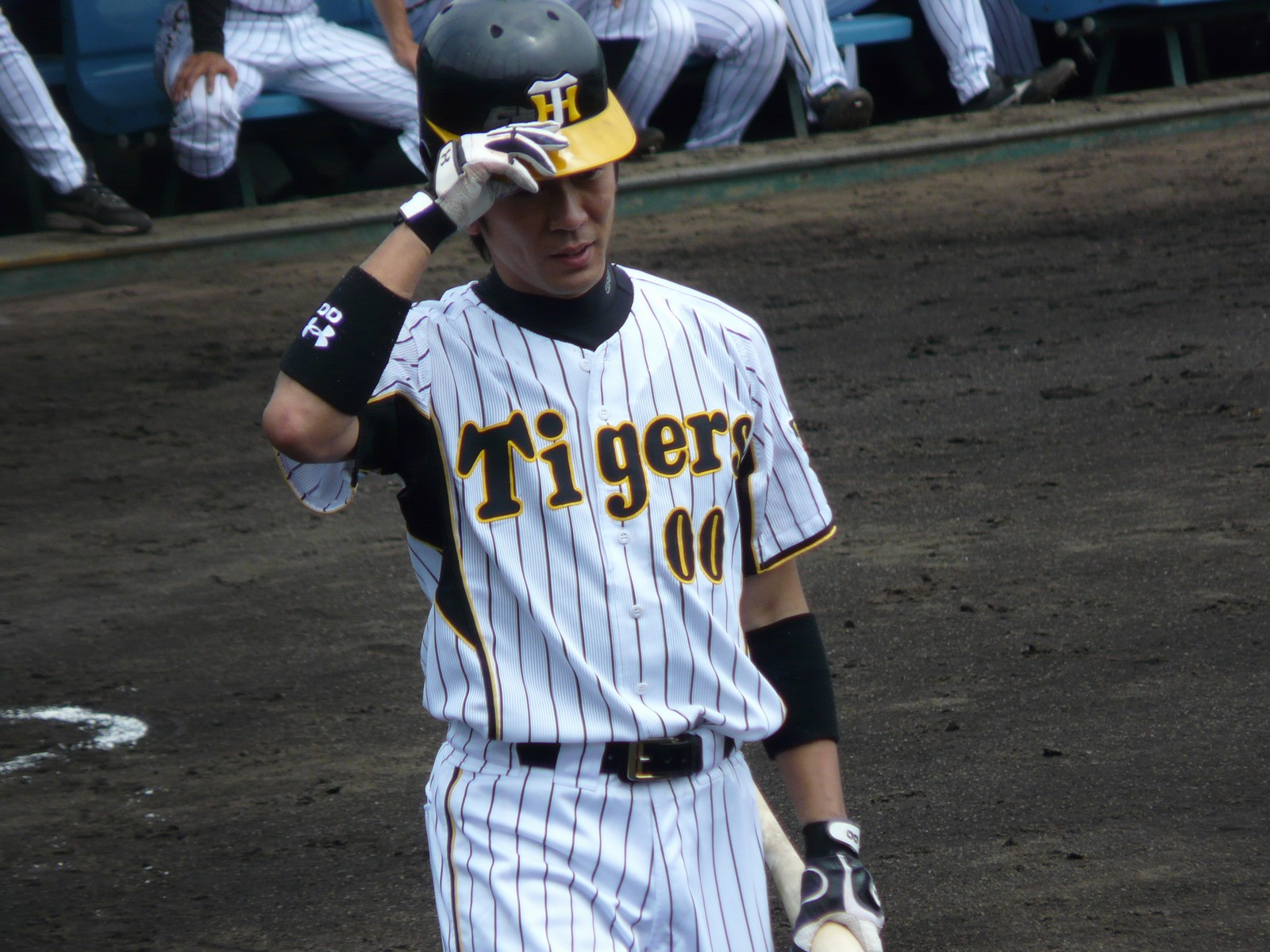

Hanshin Tigers – No. 70
- Infielder / Coach
- Born: February 23, 1977 (age 49); Yokohama, Japan
- Bats: Left Throws: Right

NPB debut
- September 21, 1995, for the Hanshin Tigers

NPB statistics (through 2008 season)
- Batting average: .230
- Hits: 200
- RBIs: 52
- Stats at Baseball Reference

Teams
- As player: Hanshin Tigers (1995–2009); As coach: Hanshin Tigers (2021–present)
- Last updated on: 2 February 2021

Shuta Tanaka (田中 秀太, Tanaka Shūta; simply called Shuta (秀太)) is a Japanese retired professional Nippon Professional Baseball player.

== Biography ==
=== Early years ===
Shuta Tanaka was born in Yokohama, Kanagawa, Japan and lived there until his elementary school days. He moved to Kitakyushu, Fukuoka because his father Hisayuki became the manager of Nissan Kyushu Baseball Team. Then he entered Kumamoto Technical High School, thus there are biographical notes in the players list which shows that he is from Kumamoto.

He played in the 66th National High School Baseball Invitational Tournament held in 1994, then was drafted by the Hanshin Tigers at 3rd.

=== Professional career ===
Shuta played for the Hanshin Tigers until 2009. He recorded 200 hits of 871 at bats (average.233) and batted in 52 runs. He could not play in the major level in 2009 and announced on September 18 that he decided to retire the player in August with consultations with his family and Atsushi Kataoka. His last play was the Western League game against the Fukuoka SoftBank Hawks at Hanshin Koshien Stadium on September 23, in which he got 2 hits. Over 7,000 specters attended to see his last play.

After retiring he is a scout in the Kyushu region for the Hanshin Tigers.
