= Takashi Uemoto =

Japanese baseball player (born 1990)

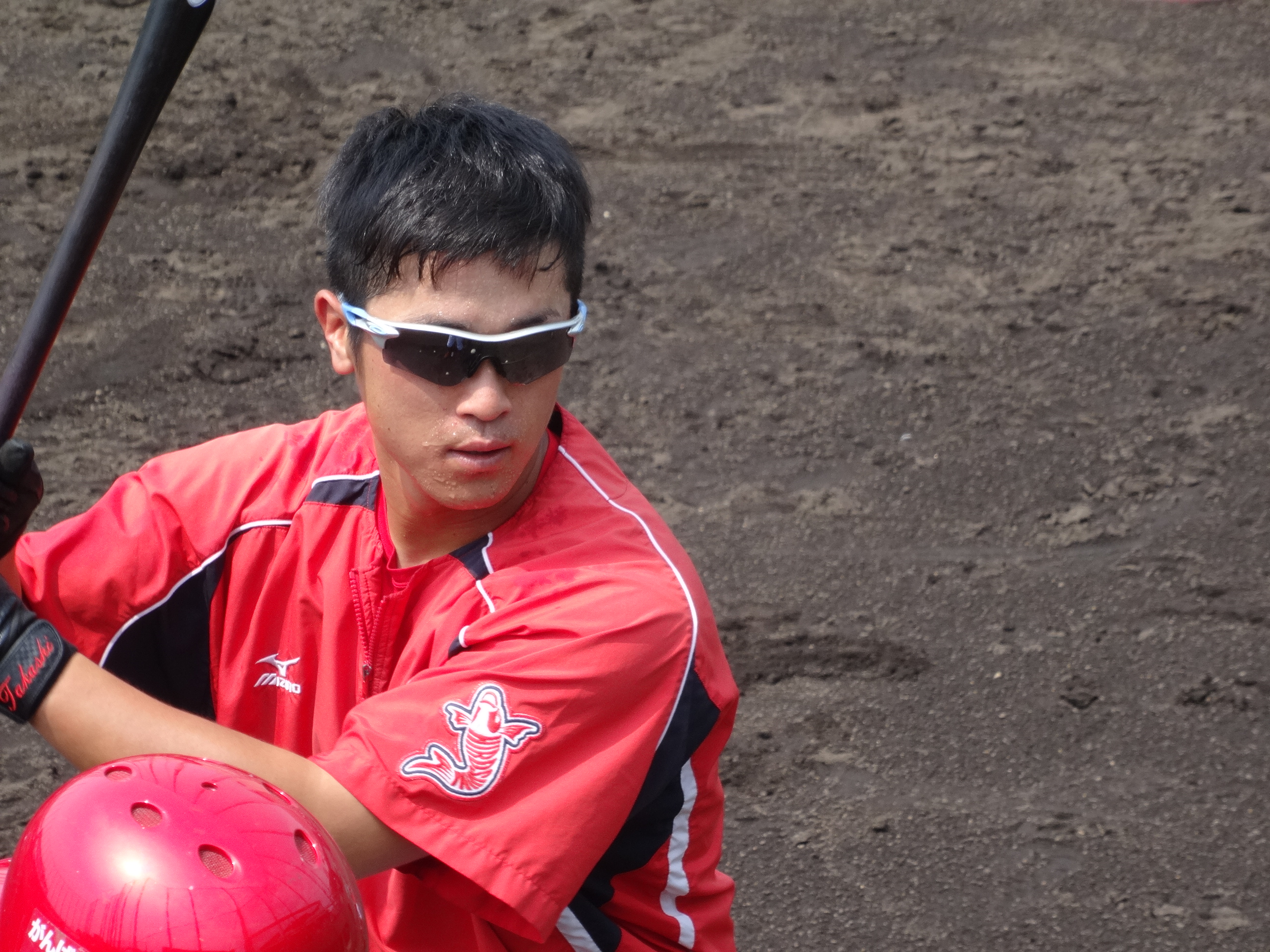
- Uemoto with the Hiroshima Toyo Carp
- Infielder
- Born: August 22, 1990 (age 35); Fukuyama, Hiroshima, Japan
- Batted: Both Threw: Right

NPB debut
- May 7, 2013, for the Hiroshima Toyo Carp

Last NPB appearance
- 2025, for the Hiroshima Toyo Carp

NPB statistics
- Batting average: .250
- Home runs: 3
- Runs batted in: 50
- Stats at Baseball Reference

Teams
- Hiroshima Toyo Carp (2013–2014, 2016–2025)

Takashi Uemoto (上本 崇司, Uemoto Takashi; born August 22, 1990 in Fukuyama, Hiroshima, Japan) is a professional Japanese baseball player. He plays infielder for the Hiroshima Toyo Carp.

His elder brother Hiroki was also a professional baseball player who played for Hanshin Tigers.
