= Takeshi Hidaka =

Japanese baseball player (born 1977)

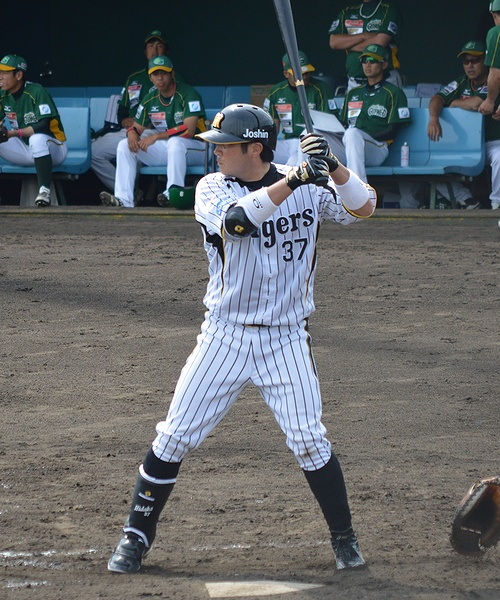

Hanshin Tigers – No. 84
- Catcher / Coach
- Born: August 15, 1977 (age 48); Kitakyushu
- Batted: Right Threw: Right

NPB debut
- April 16, 1998, for the Orix BlueWave

Last NPB appearance
- June 6, 2014, for the Hanshin Tigers

NPB statistics
- Batting average: .237
- Home runs: 79
- Run batted in: 434
- Stats at Baseball Reference

Teams
- As player: Orix BlueWave/Orix Buffaloes (1998–2012); Hanshin Tigers (2013–2014); As coach: Hanshin Tigers (2019–present)

Takeshi Hidaka (日高 剛, Hidaka Takeshi; born August 15, 1977 in Kitakyushu, Fukuoka) is a Japanese former Nippon Professional Baseball player. He played with the Orix BlueWave/Orix Buffaloes from 1998 to 2012 and the Hanshin Tigers from 2013 to 2014.
