= Katsuo Hirata =

Japanese baseball player (born 1959)

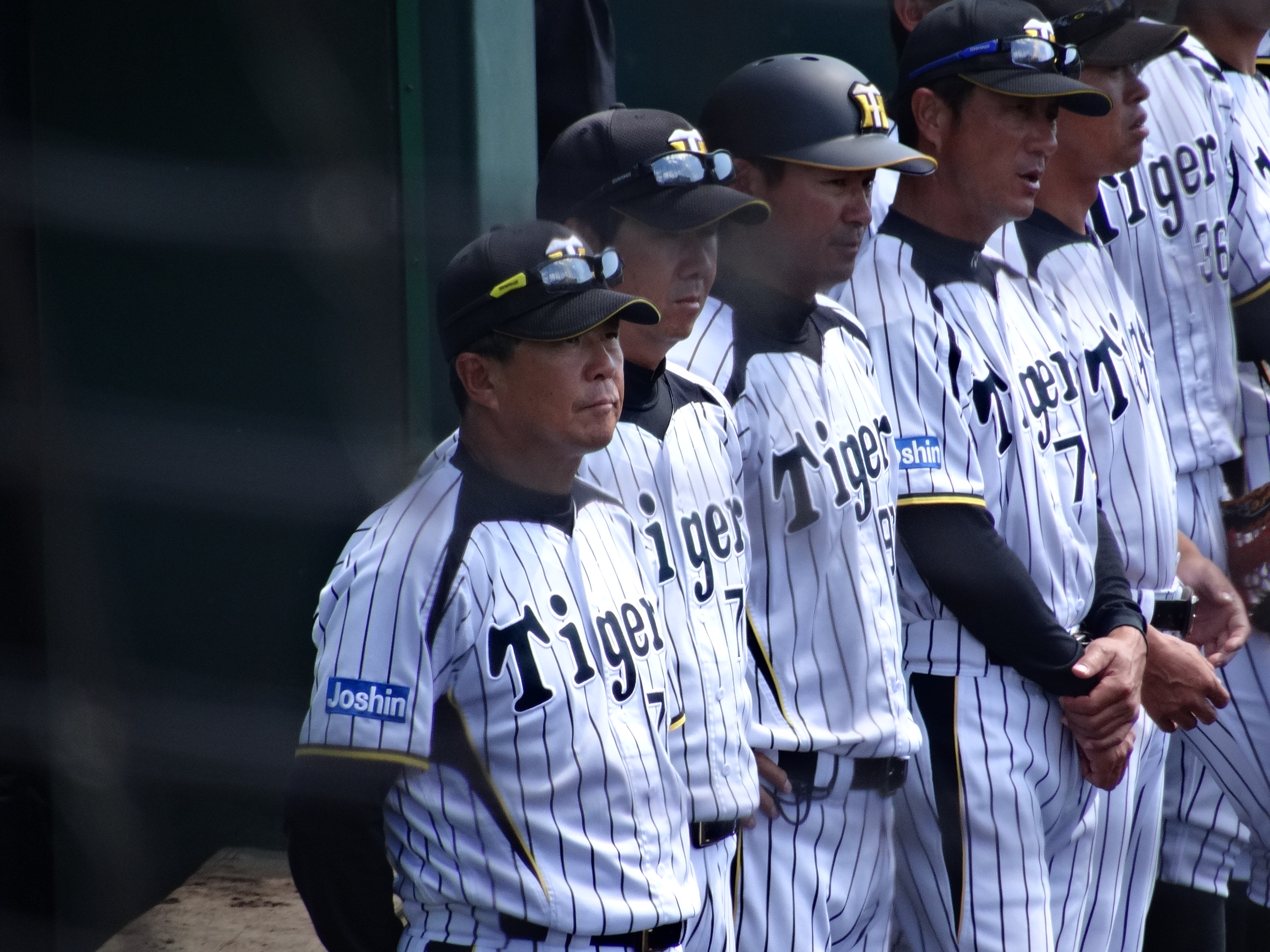

Hanshin Tigers – No. 78
- Infielder / Coach
- Born: July 31, 1959 (age 66); Matsuura, Nagasaki, Japan
- Batted: Right Threw: Right

NPB debut
- April 7, 1982, for the Hanshin Tigers

Last NPB appearance
- October 1, 1994, for the Hanshin Tigers

NPB statistics
- Batting average: .258
- Hits: 633
- Home runs: 23
- Runs batted in: 220
- Stolen bases: 19
- Stats at Baseball Reference

Teams
- As player: Hanshin Tigers (1982–1994); As coach: Hanshin Tigers (1997–2001, 2004–2010, 2013–present)

Career highlights and awards
- Japan Series champion (1985); 1× NPB All-Star (1985); 4× Mitsui Golden Glove Award (1984–1987)

Katsuo Hirata (平田 勝男, Hirata Katsuo; born July 31, 1959) is a former professional baseball player from Matsuura, Nagasaki, Japan.
