= Tampere Tigers =

Baseball and softball club in Tampere, Finland

- Full name: Tampere Tigers Baseball Club
- Founded: 2004
- Stadium: Tampere Tigers Baseball Field, Tampere
- Chairman: (Honduras) Mauricio Rosales
- Manager: (Honduras) Mauricio Rosales (2016–present)
- League: SM Sarja - Superbaseball & Suomi Sarja - Fat Lizard League
- 2025: SM Sarja: Champions; Suomi Sarja: 6th place; Softball: N/A; Juniors: N/A

Tampere Tigers is a baseball and softball club based in Tampere, Finland. The club competes in both Finnish Baseball Leagues, Suomi Sarja and SM Sarja, and is the current SM Sarja Champion in baseball. Founded in 2004, the Tigers also have a women's softball team, a Baseball5 team and run a juniors program for children aged 7–13.

== History ==
=== Founding years and initial growth (2005–2008) ===
The Tigers, named after the Japanese Hanshin Tigers, began in 2005, entering the Finnish Baseball League with 18 players. Despite finishing 5th in their debut season, they celebrated Rookie of the Year honors for Tomi Krogerus. In 2006, the Tigers aimed for a top-3 spot, narrowly missing it but showing marked improvement, with Tuomo Mesimäki and Niko Wirgentius earning league awards. By 2008, they had qualified for their first postseason, proving themselves in hard-fought games against the dominant Espoo Expos.

=== Key individual performances and league progression (2009–2012) ===
Despite challenging seasons, the Tigers boasted standout individual achievements, including Tommi Harala's league-best .514 batting average in 2009 and a league-high fielding percentage in 2010. Shifting to Suomi Sarja (First Division) in 2011, they achieved a solid 3-1-1 record before returning to SM Sarja in 2012, with Andres Mena leading the league with a .512 average.

=== Consistent improvement and Suomi Sarja playoff success (2013–2015) ===
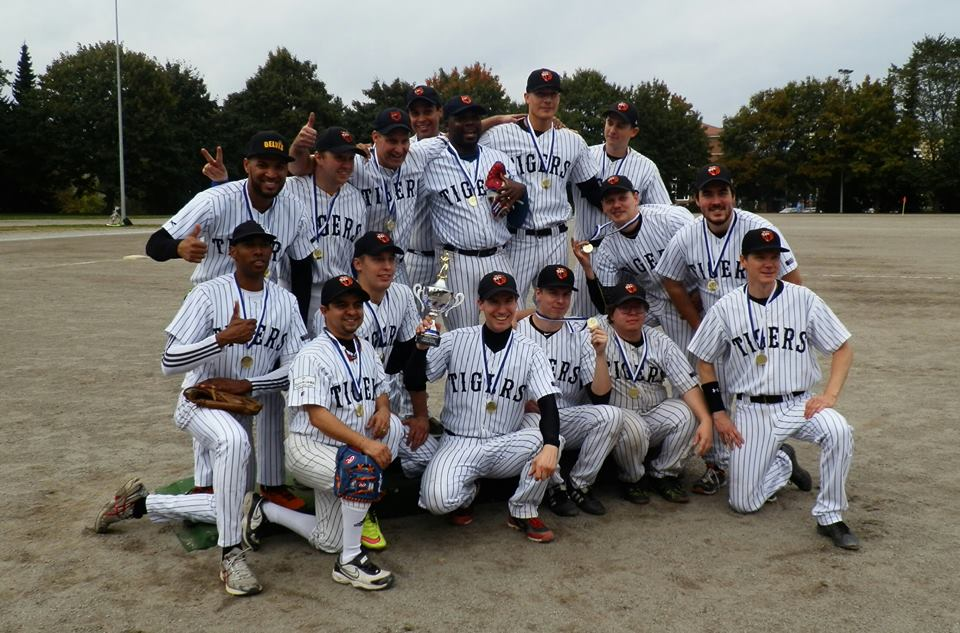
The Tampere Tigers became Suomi Sarjaa Champions for the first time in 2016.

The Tigers continued to rise in the standings, with Andres Mena and Yoan Martinez consistently topping the league in batting averages. In 2015, the Tigers returned to Suomi Sarja, earning their second playoff appearance and finishing the season as runners-up, marking another high point in their early history.

=== Historic championship and New Horizons (2016–2018) ===
2016 was a landmark year for the Tigers, who clinched their first Suomi Sarja title following an exceptional 13–2 regular season. In 2017, they expanded to both SM Sarja and Suomi Sarja, achieving a strong 3rd place in SM Sarja and back-to-back Suomi Sarja championships. They also established their first women's softball team, playing three exhibition games and underscoring the club's growth in both performance and structure. By 2018, the Tigers’ roster was at a record high, and they reached the Suomi Sarja playoffs once more, only to fall in the semifinals to rivals Espoo XL5.

=== First SM Sarja Finals and continued success (2019–2021) ===
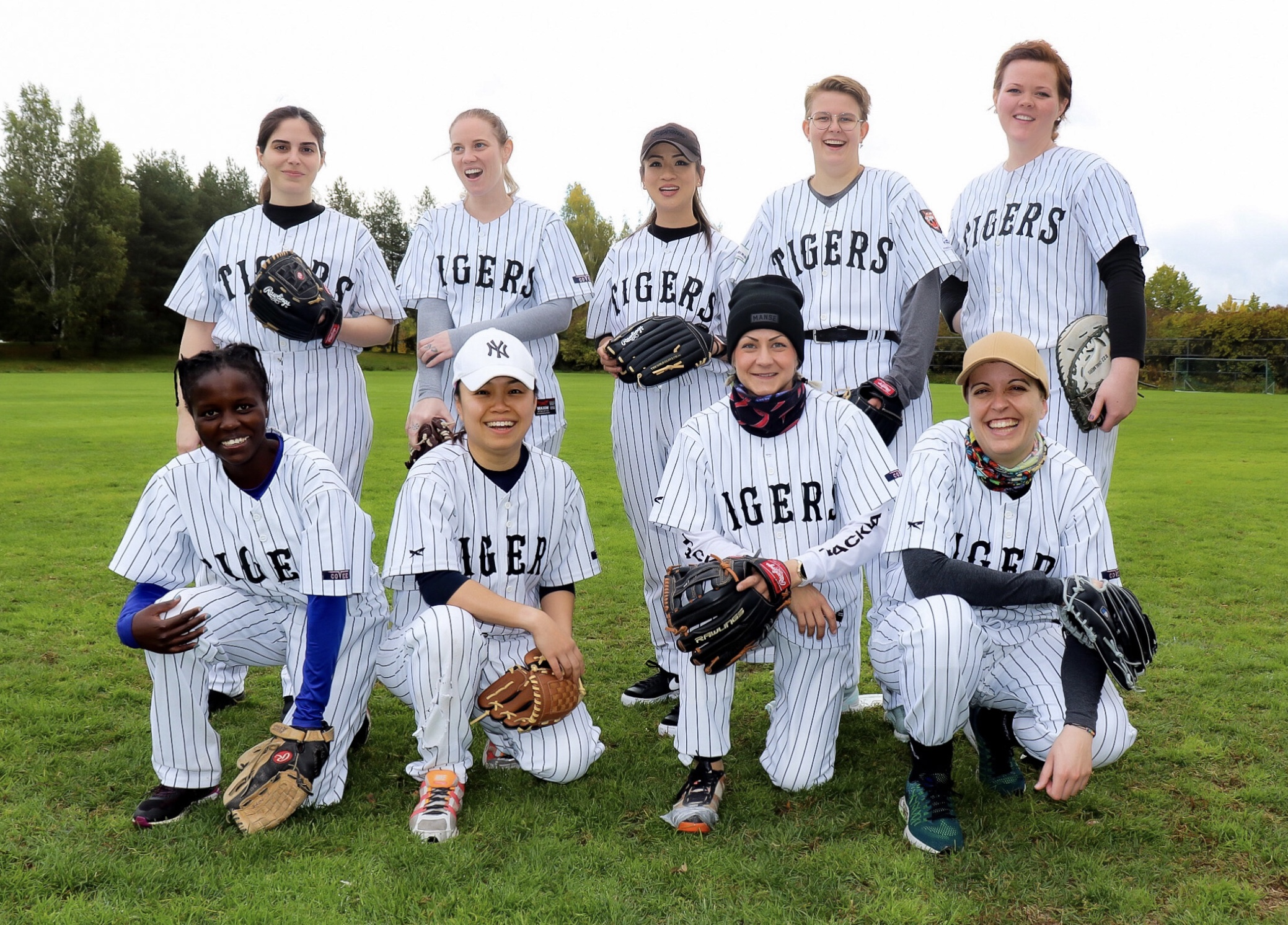
The 2021 Tampere Tigers softball, National Champions

In 2019, the Tigers reached the SM Sarja finals for the first time, finishing as runners-up in a hard-fought five-game series. While they opted out of the SM Sarja finals in 2020 due to disputes with league management, they returned in 2021 to claim their first SM Sarja title, defeating the Espoo Expos. The Tigers’ softball team also won the Finnish national title, earning both baseball and softball championships in a single season, a club milestone.

=== European Representation and Record-Breaking Seasons (2022–2023) ===
2022 was a record-breaking year with a 14–1 regular season, though the Tigers fell in the SM Sarja finals. Their first appearance in the European Cup Qualifiers in Poland highlighted the club's growing international presence. In 2023, they returned to the European Cup in Budapest, achieving their first international win against Sofia Leaders. Both Superbaseball and Fat Lizard teams topped the regular season in Finland, though both fell just short in the finals. A notable 11-game win streak in Superbaseball underscored their continued local dominance.

=== Strengthened Juniors and international play (2024) ===
The Tigers faced a challenging Superbaseball season in 2024, finishing 3rd due to bullpen gaps, but they advanced to the Suomi Sarja semifinals with a mid-season roster boost. Competing in their third European Cup Qualifier in Stockholm, they faced some of Europe's strongest teams. Meanwhile, the Tigers’ juniors program celebrated its second year in the Baltic Junior Games in Estonia, marking their first international win, a promising step for the next generation of Tigers players.

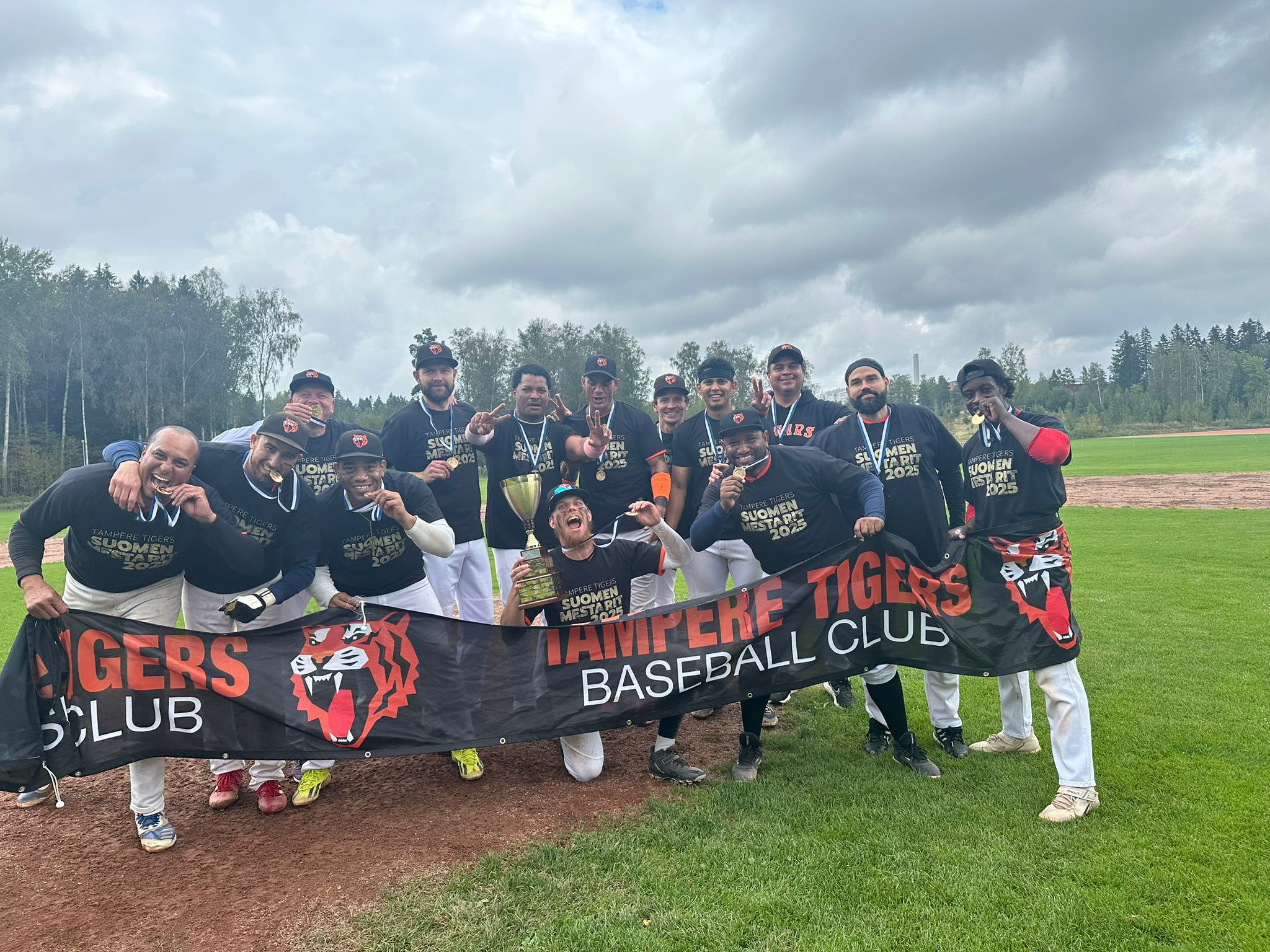
Tampere Tigers Finnish Champions 2025

SM Sarja Champions – 2025 Season

The 2025 season began with some early defeats, but the Tigers grew steadily over the summer, building momentum with a 12-game winning streak. They advanced to the semifinals, eliminating multiple-time champions Espoo Expos 2–0 to reach the final against Helsinki Puumat. The Tigers dominated the finals, winning three straight games to secure the championship. Strong pitching, near-perfect defense, smart base-running, and timely hitting were key to their success.

With the SM Sarja title in hand, the Tampere Tigers will represent Finland at the Baseball European Federation Cup Qualifier in June 2026 for the fourth time, marking another milestone in the club's growing international presence.

The Tampere Tigers Softball team won the Finnish Championship Series 2–0 against the Helsinki Sandstorm, successfully defending their national title. The victory also secured the team a place in the 2026 European Softball Winners Cup.

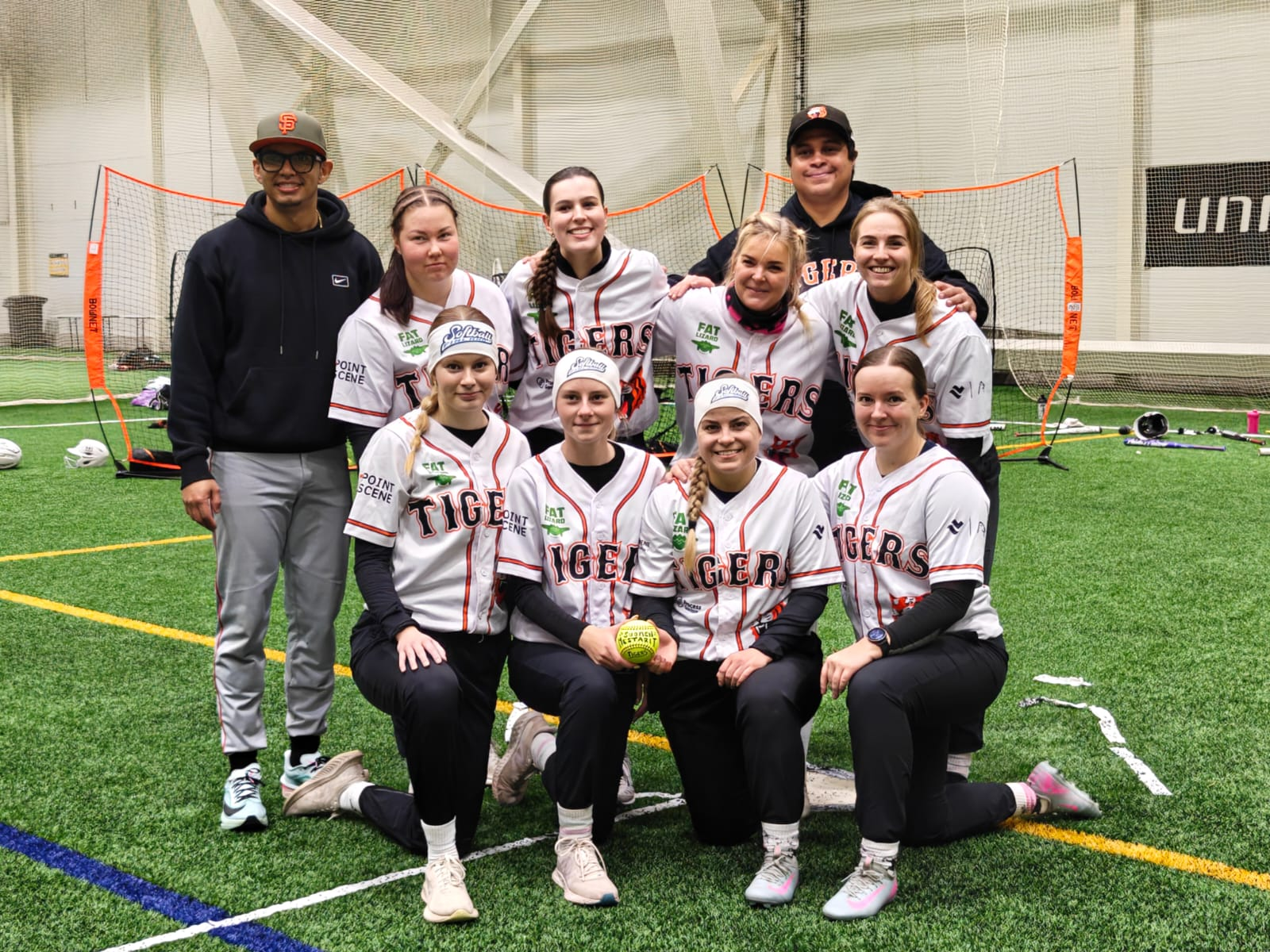
Tampere Tigers Softball, Finnish Champions 2025

== Players 2025 ==
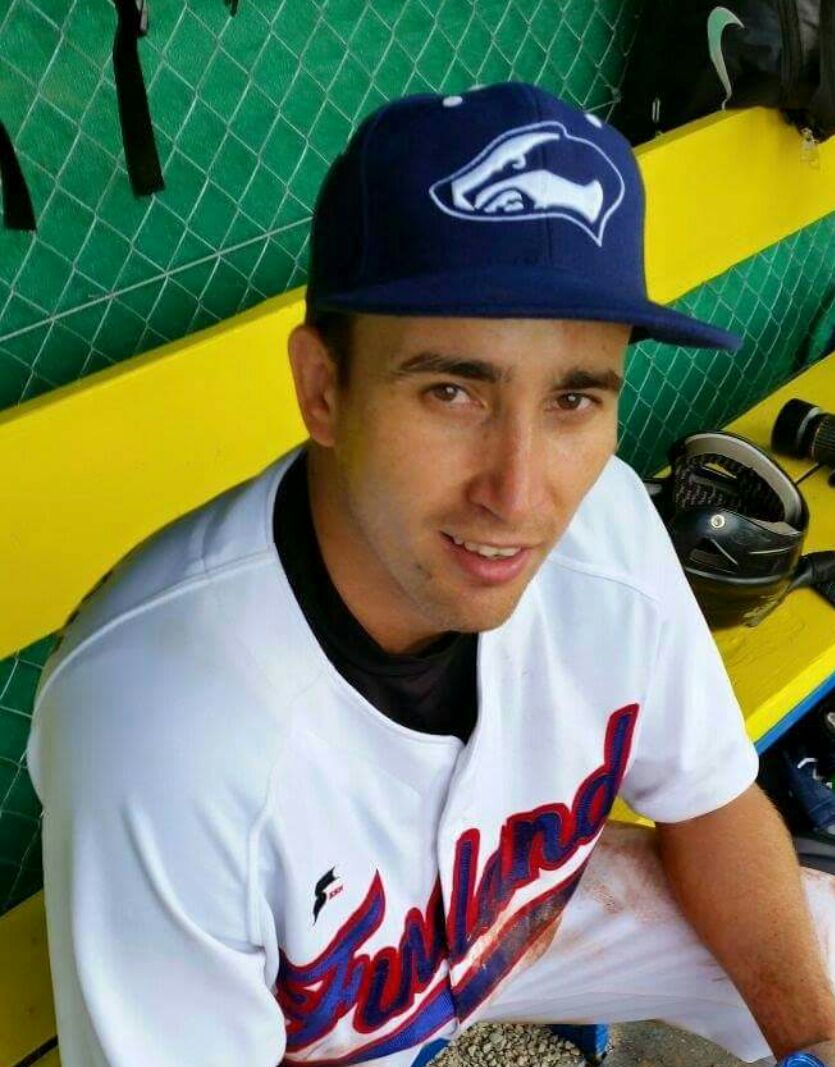
Finnish International Sergio Fernandez, considered one of the best players in the history of baseball in Finland is the captain of the Tigers

=== Official list of players ===
- (Cuba) Jose Mesa
- (Cuba) Sergio Fernandez
- (Honduras) Mauricio Rosales
- (Finland) Niko Mäki
- (Cuba) Gabriel Rosell
- (Cuba) Enieri Mainegra
- (Mexico) Luis Noyola
- (Mexico) Jose Gonzales
- (Venezuela) Juan Carlos Mendez
- (Finland) Corey Niemi
- (Cuba) Adunais Perez
- (Cuba) Leodanys Ramos
- (Finland) Jyri Portin
- (Finland) Sakari Keskitalo
- (Dominican Republic) Israel Perez
- (Venezuela) Emiliano Rivero
- (Venezuela) Alejandro Touzett
- (Finland) Pasi Tulonen
- (Finland) Juha-Pekka Niemi
- (Finland) Tommi Harala
- (Finland) Oskari Keskitalo
- (Finland) Topias Keskitalo
- (Dominican Republic) Deivid Murgelj
- (Cuba) Adrian Dominguez
- (Finland) Miika Savolainen
- (Finland) Kasperi Salo
- (Finland) Jenna Niemi
- (Finland) Niilo Lowell
- (Cuba) Alcides Hechavarria Wilson
- (Finland) Kim Laurén
- (United States) Drew Davis
- (Finland) Teemu Luomanpera

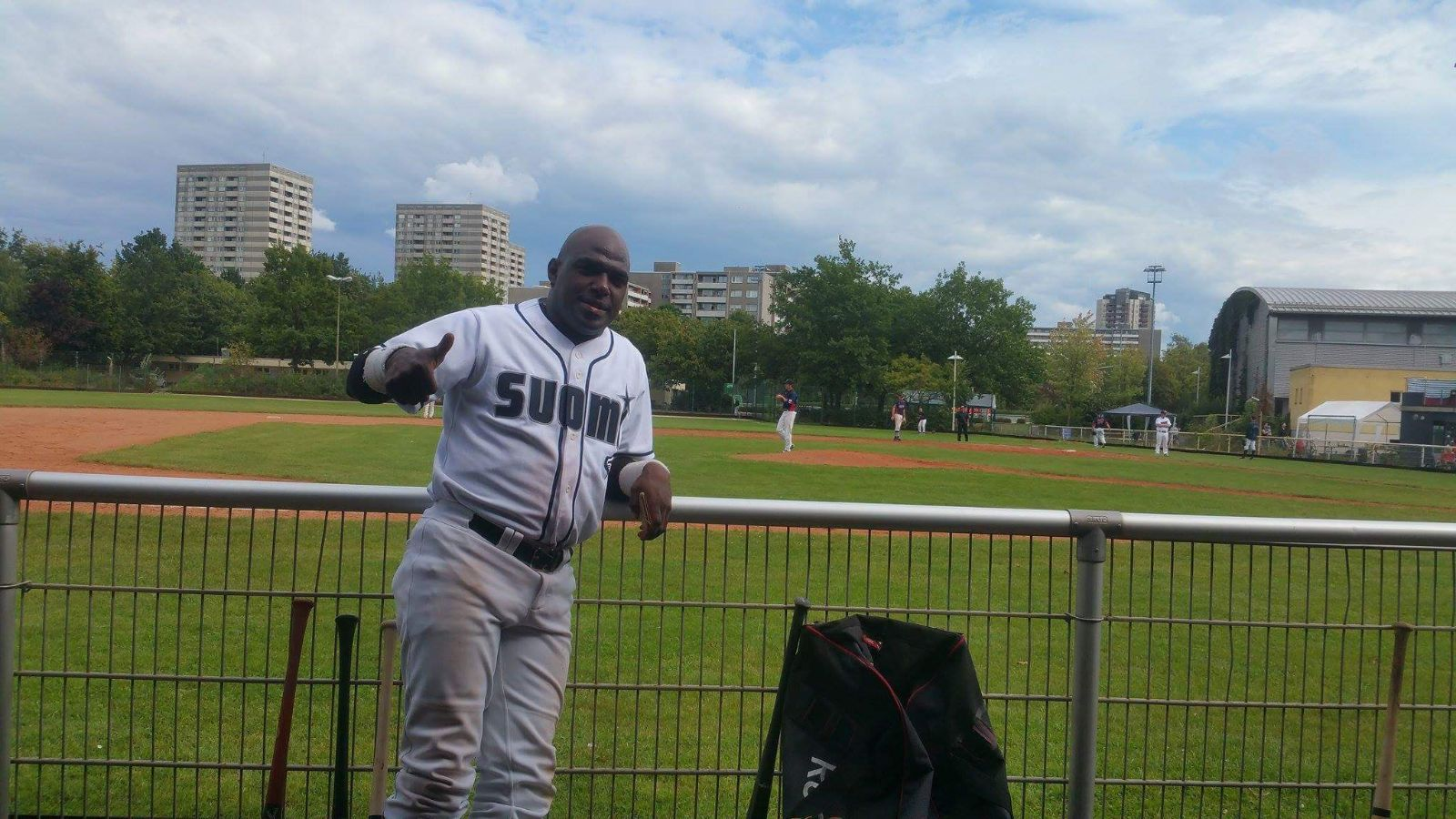
Andres Mena of Cuban origin has been one of the best players in Finland. He started his career in the country playing as a short stop for the Tigers. Currently he plays in Spain.

== Managers ==
The Tigers have employed various managers and coaches. Working with the club's board, the stated objectives have been player development and the formation of a team for each season.

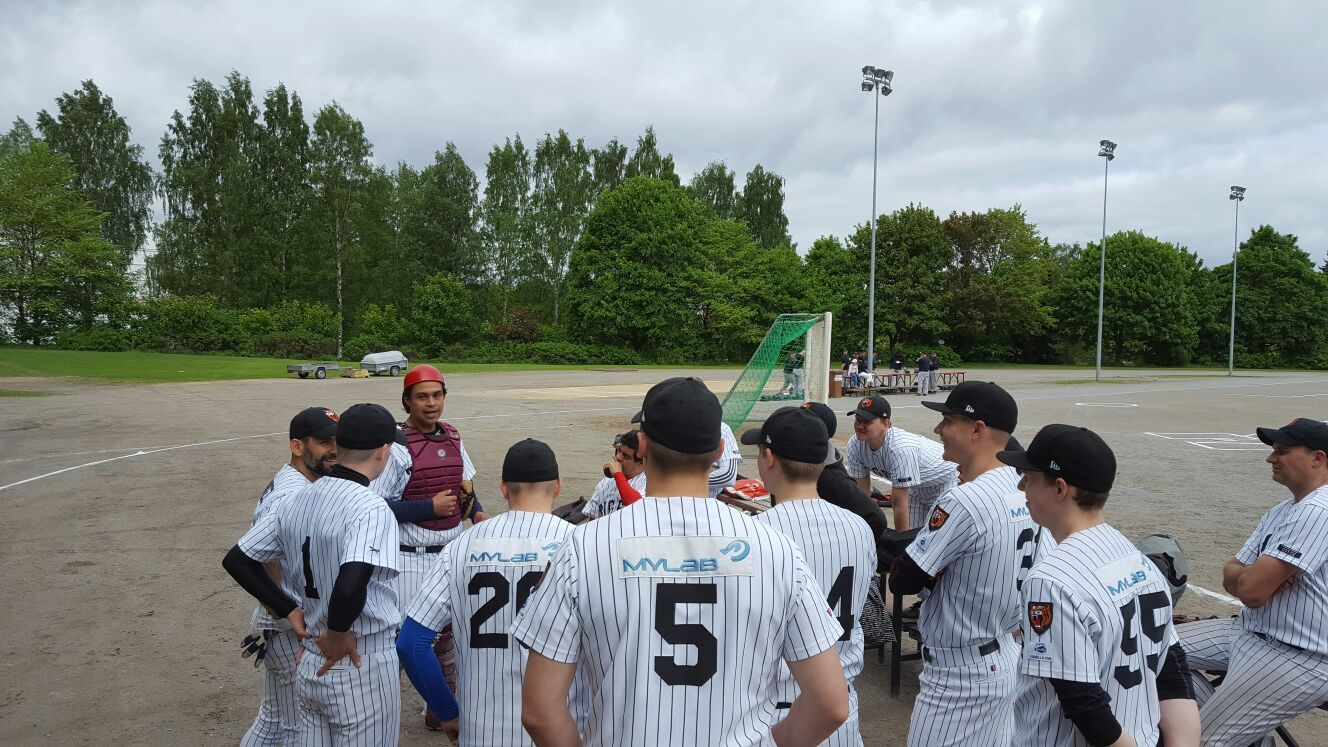
Tiger's pregame meeting, getting ready to take on their rivals

- 2004 (Finland) Lassi Autio
- 2005 (Finland) Lassi Autio
- 2006 (Finland) Lassi Autio
- 2007 (Venezuela) Oliver Paredes
- 2008 (Finland) Tuomo Mesimäki
- 2009 (Finland) Lassi Autio
- 2010 (Finland) Aki Ropo
- 2011 (Finland) Lassi Autio
- 2012 (Finland) Aki Ropo
- 2013 (Cuba) Andres Mena
- 2014 (Mexico) Luis Noyola
- 2015 (Finland) Lassi Autio
- 2016 (Honduras) Mauricio Rosales
- 2017 (Honduras) Mauricio Rosales
- 2018 (Honduras) Mauricio Rosales
- 2019 (Honduras) Mauricio Rosales
- 2020 (Honduras) Mauricio Rosales
- 2021 (Honduras) Mauricio Rosales
- 2022 (Honduras) Mauricio Rosales
- 2023 (Honduras) Mauricio Rosales
- 2024 (Honduras) Mauricio Rosales
- 2025 (Honduras) Mauricio Rosales

== Former or currently inactive players ==
Throughout its history, the team has had an array of extra ordinary players. Some are still active in other teams in Finland and some are playing overseas. Some of the players have had previous experience playing baseball while some others learned to play in the club.

=== List of former or currently inactive players ===
- (Cuba) Roynet Perez (Dominican Republic) Raynel Corporan (Taiwan) Yi-Chen Li (Dominican Republic) Danis Garcia (Estonia) Aleksandr Igitov (Estonia) Ergo Rohi (Estonia) Tauno Koppel (Estonia) Aleks Koppel (Cuba) Silvio Quevedo (Cuba) Yoan Martinez (Dominican Republic) Samuel Figueroa (Finland) Henri Santala (Finland) Janne Pihlajaniemi (Dominican Republic) Willys Reyes (Cuba) Yendrys Serrano (Finland) Tuomas Virtanen (Dominican Republic) Luis Diaz (Finland) Janne Ylänkö (Finland) Miikka Aaltonen (Cuba) Andres Mena (Dominican Republic) Williams Kelly (Cuba) Remberto Martinez (Finland) Niklas Palander (Finland) Santeri Heino (Finland) Toni Kemppainen (Cuba) Duviel Fernandez (Cuba) Harvey Fernandez (Finland) Severi Lehtimäki (Finland) Tuomo Vestola (Australia) Simon Visser (Australia) Cassie Andersen (Finland) Anssi Rämä (Finland) Riku Sjöroos (Finland) Tuomas Lemmetty (Finland) Markus Blommendahl (Finland) Jarkko Vilkkilä (Finland) Otto Nojonen (Finland) Jarkko Juutilainen (Finland) Tomi Krogerus (Finland) Arni Hukari (Finland) Akira Ropo (Finland) Aki Ropo (Finland) Toni Sjöman (Venezuela) Oliver Paredes (Finland) Juha Kurki (Finland) Mikko Salmensuo (Finland) Mauno Ahlgren (Finland) Jarmo Rintala (Finland) Aarne Juutilainen (Finland) Olli Mehtonen (Finland) Klaus Tamminen (Finland) Niko Wirgentius (Finland) Tuomo Mesimäki (Cuba) Abel Maranon (Japan) Julian Hasegawa (Finland) Ton Sjöman (Finland) Jyrki Nummenmaa (Finland) Samuli Ikola (Finland) Tomi Karppinen (Finland) Kari Harjunniemi (Finland) Jarkko Kettunen (Colombia) Carlos Ardila (Finland) Tommi Tuominen (Finland) Juha Antikainen (Colombia) Alberto Martinez (Finland) Tommi Sakki (Cuba) Victor Viloria (Finland) Simopekka Vänskä (Canada) Marc Phillipe (Finland) Tomi Mäntymaa (Finland) Tuomas Miskala (Finland) Jarkko Mällinen (Finland) Harri Moisio (Cuba) Edvin Suarez (Finland) Konsta Eskelinen (Finland) Otto Eskelinen (Cuba) Victor Maso (Dominican Republic) Antony De la Cruz (Finland) Atro-Matti Puruskainen (Finland) Heikki Valkama (Finland) Toivo Aaltonen (Cuba) Dayron Lester (Finland) Markku Tikka (Finland) Teemu Takala (Finland) Antti Kiviniemi (Finland) Markus Kailanto (United States) Don Kilpela (United States) Jake Binney (Finland) Markku Tikka (Finland) Henri Virinsalo (Finland) Juuso Valkeala (Finland) Jarmo Rintala (Finland) Jarkko Vilkkilä (Finland) Mikko Helin (Finland) Joni Holmberg (Cuba) Dennys King (Finland) Roope Korhonen (Finland) Mikko Siltanen (Finland) Samuel Kivi (India) Narender Kumar (Dominican Republic) Rafael Espinal (Nicaragua) Gilberto Ruiz (Cuba) Silvio Guarat (Finland) Jeremi Rannikko (Finland) Riku Katajamäki (Finland) Eemi Huhtinen (Finland) Jani Aaltonen (Cuba) Wilmer Wilson (Dominican Republic) Elwin Rosario (Italy) Martin Magris (Finland) Lassi Autio (Finland) Teo Scheepstra (Finland) Camilla Lehtimäki (Finland) Roberto Martinez (Canada) Sidney Kitchen (Mexico) Vicente Herrera (Finland) Heidi Rimpi (Cuba) Yuber Fajardo (Finland) Petteri Peijonen (Finland) Tuomas Virtanen (United States) Patrick Carney (Cuba) Christian Camacho
- Some of the players in this list become available and return to the team to play in a particular season while some others have already retired from the sport.

== Statistics ==
=== Tigers SM Sarja record (including post season games) ===
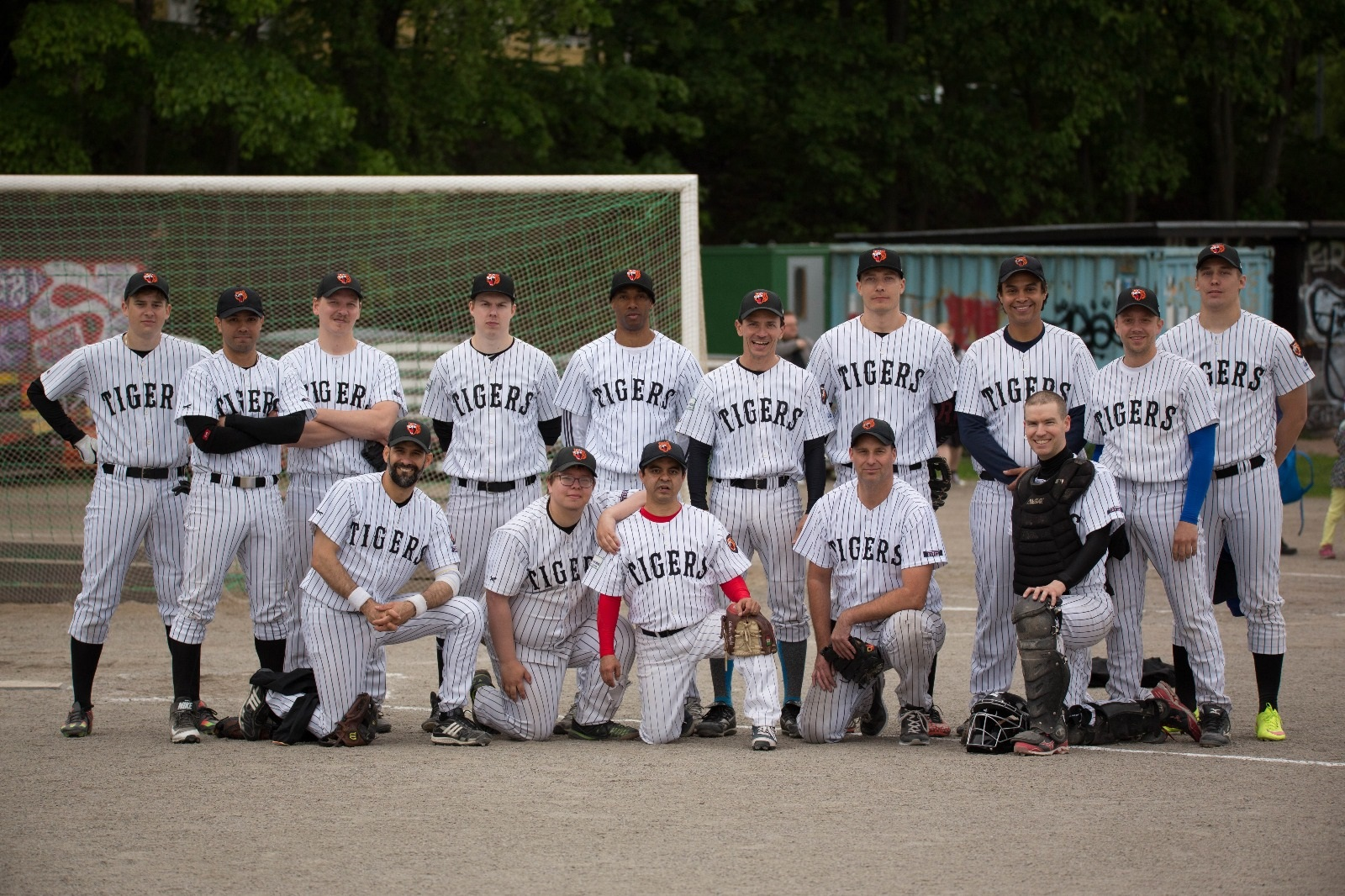
Tampere Tigers in 2016

Year	Games	Win	Loss
2005	15	4	11
2006	12	4	8
2007	12	1	11
2008	14	4	10
2009	16	3	13
2010	15	3	12
2012	12	3	9
2013	15	4	11
2014	15	5	10
2017	16	9	7
2018	16	6	10
2019	20	15	5
2020	17	12	5
2021	20	15	5
2022	18	14	4
2023	17	13	4
2024	14	3	11
2025	20	14	6
Total	284	132	145

=== Tigers Suomi Sarja record (including post season games) ===
Year	Games	Win	Tie	Loss
2004	4	1	1	2
2011	5	3	1	1
2015	13	7	1	5
2016	16	14	0	2
2017	15	14	0	1
2018	12	7	1	4
2019	12	8	0	4
2020	14	9	0	5
2021	14	10	0	4
2022	12	5	1	6
2023	12	8	0	4
2024	16	8	0	8
2025	13	5	0	8
Total	157	99	5	54

== Post-season record ==
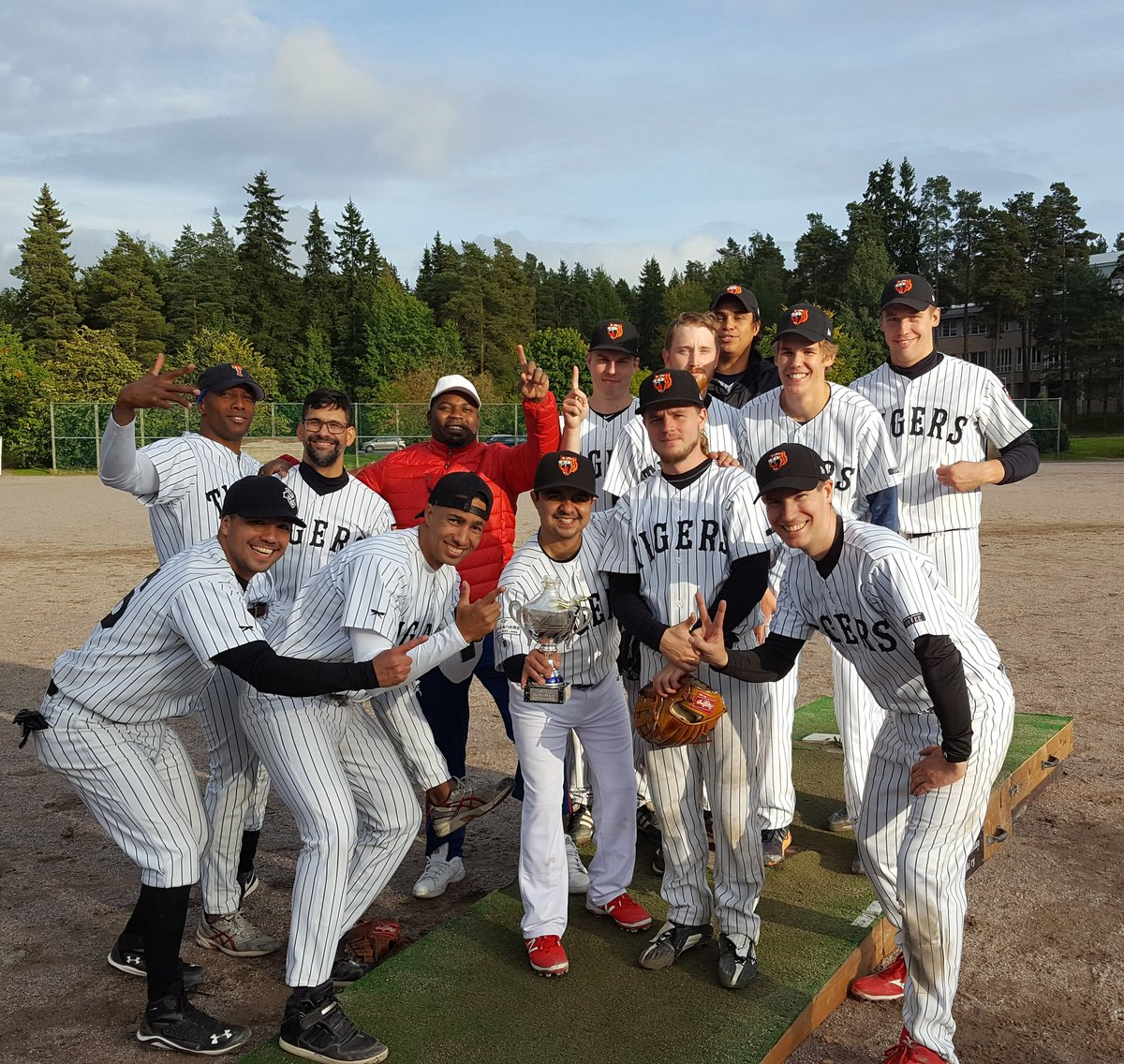
The Tigers celebrating the 2017 title after defeating XL5 in Turku

The team won its first final in 2016.

Year	League / Competition	Round	Opponent	Result	Outcome
2008	SM Sarja	Semifinal	Espoo Expos	0–2	Lost series
2015	Suomi Sarja	Final	Espoo XL5	5–14	Lost single-game final
2016	Suomi Sarja	Final	Helsinki City	8–5	Won championship
2017	Suomi Sarja	—	—	—	Won championship
2018	Suomi Sarja	Wildcard	Nokia White Sox	15–5	Won single game
2018	Suomi Sarja	Final	Espoo XL5	0–2	Lost series
2019	Suomi Sarja	Final	Espoo XL5	0–2	Lost series
2019	SM Sarja	Final	Espoo Expos	1–3	Lost series
2020	SM Sarja	Final	Espoo Expos	0–3 (forfeited games 2–3)	Lost series
2021	SM Sarja	Final	Espoo Expos	3–1	Won championship
2021	Suomi Sarja	Final	Espoo XL5	0–2	Lost series
2021	Softball Championship	Final	Helsinki Sandstorm	14–9	Won championship
2022	SM Sarja	Final	Espoo Expos	0–3	Lost series
2023	SM Sarja	Final	Espoo Expos	2–3	Lost series
2024	Suomi Sarja	Quarterfinal	Helsinki Mets	14–4	Won single game
2024	Suomi Sarja	Semifinal	Espoo XL5	2–4	Lost single game
2025	SM Sarja	Semifinal	Espoo Expos	2–0	Won series
2025	SM Sarja	Final	Puumat	3–0	Won championship

== Titles ==
Year	League / Competition	Opponent	Result	Outcome
2016	Suomi Sarja	Helsinki City	8–5	Champions
2017	Suomi Sarja	—	—	Champions
2021	SM Sarja	Espoo Expos	3–1	Champions
2021	Softball National Championship	Helsinki Sandstorm	14–9	Champions
2025	SM Sarja	Puumat	3–0	Champions
2025	Softball National Championship	Seinajoki Dexters	2–0	Champions

== See also ==
- fi:Baseballin SM-sarja
