= Noriharu Yamazaki =

Japanese baseball player (born 1986)

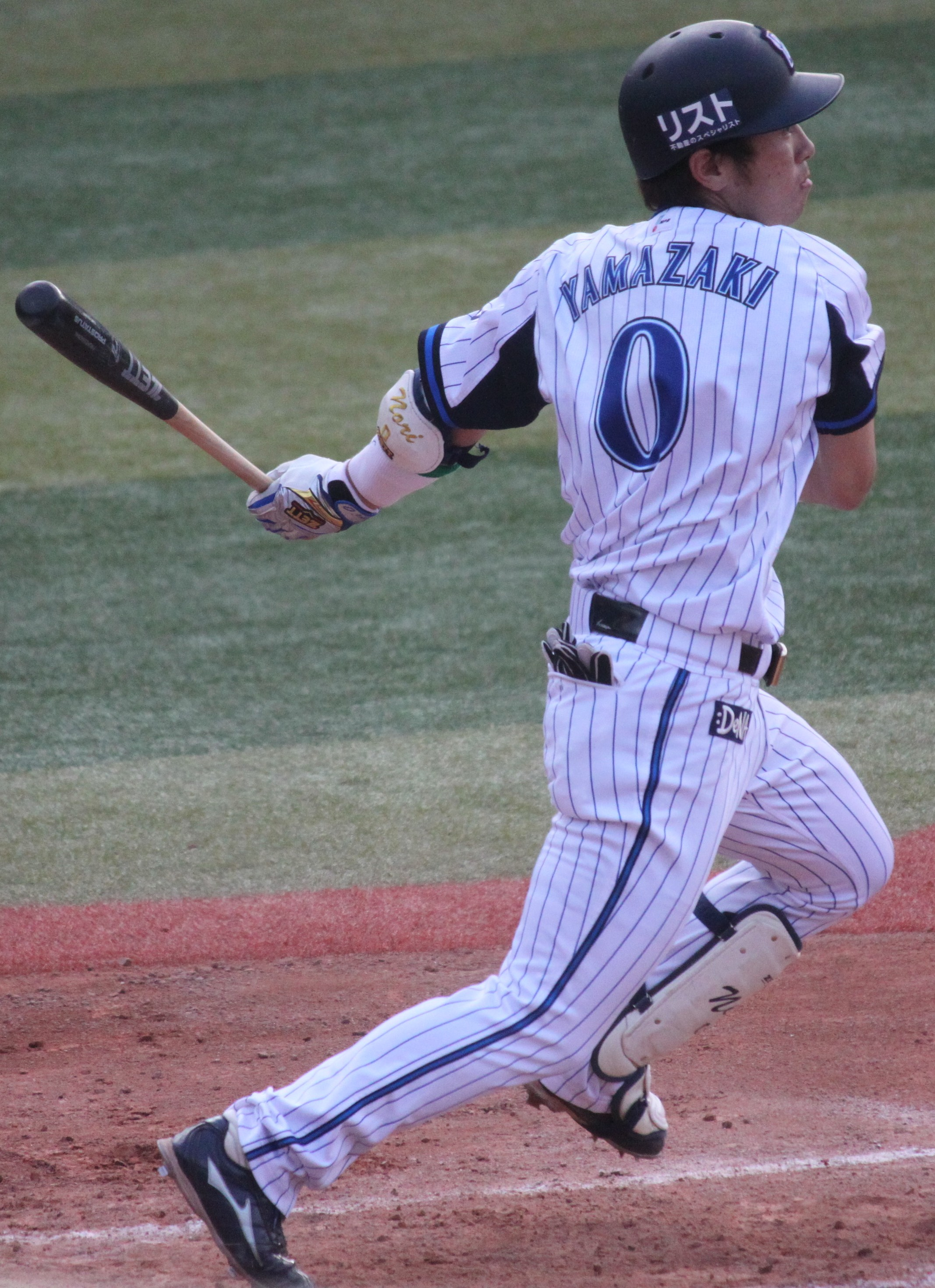
- Yamazaki with the Yokohama DeNA BayStars

Hanshin Tigers – No. 75
- Infielder / Coach
- Born: December 13, 1986 (age 39); Fuji, Shizuoka, Japan
- Batted: Right Threw: Right

NPB debut
- April 3, 2009, for the Yokohama BayStars

Last NPB appearance
- April 10, 2019, for the Hanshin Tigers

Career statistics (through 2019 season)
- Batting average: .218
- Home runs: 6
- Runs batted in: 58
- Hits: 175
- Stolen bases: 7
- Runs: 102
- Stats at Baseball Reference

Teams
- As player: Yokohama BayStars/Yokohama DeNA BayStars (2009–2017); Hanshin Tigers (2018–2019); As coach: Hanshin Tigers (2023-present)

Noriharu Yamazaki (山崎 憲晴, Yamazaki Noriharu; born December 13, 1986 in Fuji, Shizuoka, Japan) is a professional Japanese baseball player. He plays infielder for the Hanshin Tigers.
