= Hanshin Tigers =

Japanese baseball team

- 阪神タイガース

Logo	Cap insignia

Information
- League: Nippon Professional Baseball Central League (1950–present) Japanese Baseball League (1936–1949)
- Location: HQ in Nishinomiya, Hyōgo, Japan
- Ballpark: Hanshin Koshien Stadium (1936–present); Kyocera Dome Osaka (interim)
- Founded: December 10, 1935; 90 years ago
- Nicknames: Tora (トラ, tigers); Mōko (猛虎, fierce tigers); Nishinomiya Tigers
- Japan Series championships: 2 (1985, 2023)
- JBL championships: 4 (1937 Fall, 1938 Spring, 1944, 1947)
- CL pennants: 8 (1962, 1964, 1985, 2003, 2005, 2023, 2025, 2026)
- Playoff berths: 14 (2007, 2008, 2010, 2013, 2014, 2015, 2017, 2019, 2021, 2022, 2023, 2024, 2025, 2026)
- Former name: Osaka Tigers (1946–1960); Hanshin Club (1940–1944); Osaka Tigers (1935–1940)
- Colors: Yellow, Black, White
- Mascot: To-Lucky, Lucky, and Kita
- Retired numbers: 10; 11; 23
- Ownership: Takaoki Fujiwara
- Management: Hanshin Electric Railway Co., Ltd.
- Manager: Kyuji Fujikawa
- Website: https://hanshintigers.jp/

Current uniforms

The Hanshin Tigers (阪神タイガース, Hanshin Taigāsu) are a Nippon Professional Baseball team playing in the Central League. The team plays its games at Koshien Stadium in Nishinomiya, Hyōgo Prefecture, which is in the Hanshin area of Japan between Osaka and Kobe (part of the greater Kansai region).

The Tigers are owned by Hanshin Electric Railway Co., Ltd., a subsidiary of Hankyu Hanshin Holdings Inc. Through 2026, the franchise's all-time record is 5,847–5,416–356 (.519). The team's current manager is Kyuji Fujikawa.

The Hanshin Tigers are one of the oldest professional clubs in Japan. They played their first season in 1936 as the Osaka Tigers and assumed their current team name in 1961.

== History ==
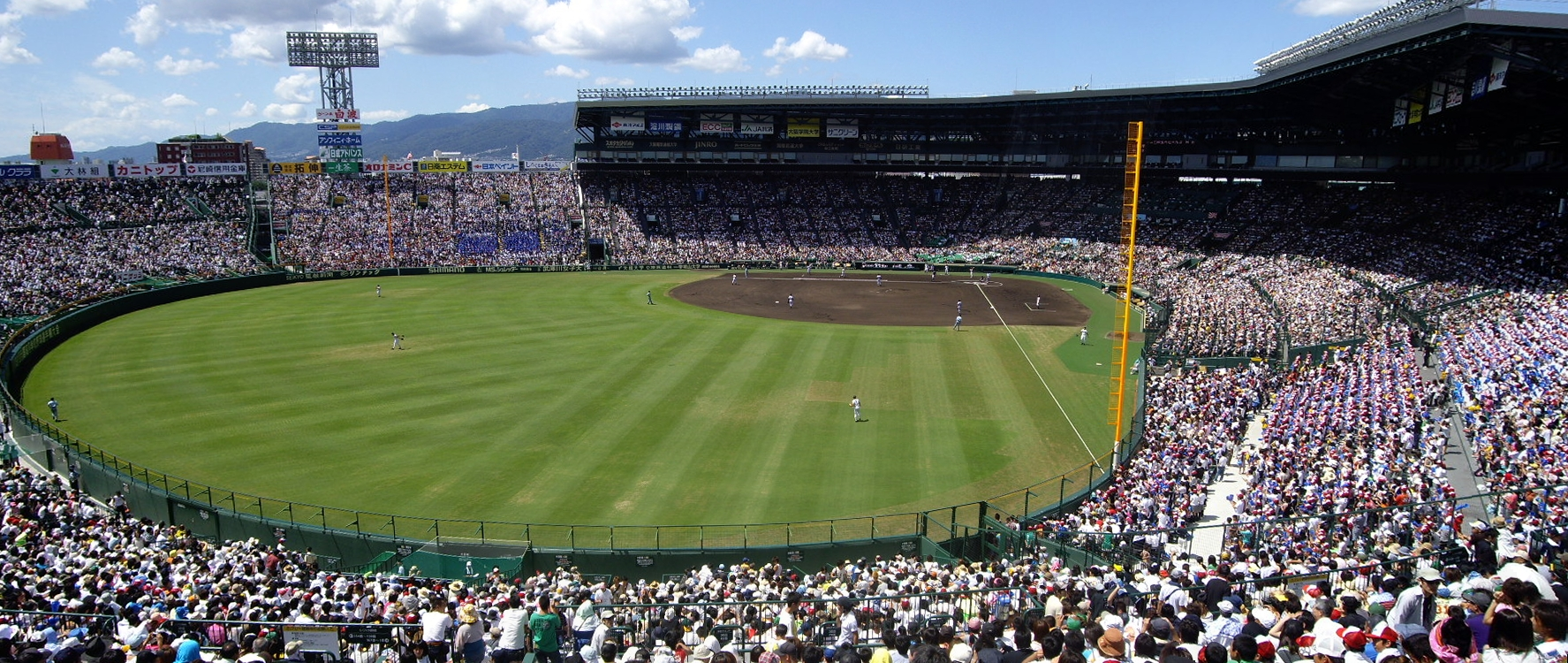
Kōshien Stadium in 2009

The Hanshin Tigers, the second-oldest professional club in Japan, were founded on December 10, 1935, with the team being formed in 1936. The team was first called Ōsaka Tigers. In 1940, amid anti-foreign sentiment and the Tojo government's ban on English nicknames, the Tigers changed the name to simply Hanshin. In 1947, the team reverted to Ōsaka Tigers after the JPBL permitted use of English nicknames. The current team name was assumed in 1961 due to the team playing in the suburb of Nishinomiya, which is not in Osaka Prefecture.

The Tigers won four titles before the establishment of the two-league system in 1950. Since the league was split into the Central League and Pacific League, the Tigers have won the Central League pennant seven times (1962, 1964, 1985, 2003, 2005, 2023, 2025) and Japan Series twice (1985, 2023).

When the 2004 Major League Baseball season began in Japan, the Tigers played an exhibition game against the New York Yankees at the Tokyo Dome on March 29. The Tigers won 11–7.

The 2025 Major League Baseball season kicked off with two games at the Tokyo Dome between the Los Angeles Dodgers and the Chicago Cubs. Prior to the series, the Tigers played exhibition games against each of these major league clubs, winning both on consecutive shutouts.

In 2005, 2006, 2007, and 2009, more than three million people attended games hosted by the Tigers, the only one of the 12 Nippon Professional Baseball teams to achieve this. In 2011, the Hanshin Tigers drew an average home attendance of 40,256.

The home field, Koshien Stadium, is used by high school baseball teams from all over Japan for the national championship tournaments in spring and summer. The summer tournament takes place in the middle of the Tigers' season, forcing the Tigers to go on a road trip and play their home games at Kyocera Dome Osaka. Prior to their arrangement to use the Dome, the Tigers would embark on an extended road trip for the duration of the high school tournaments. Fans dubbed these trips "The Road of Death".

Famous players in Hanshin Tigers history include Fumio Fujimura, Masaru Kageura, Minoru Murayama, Yutaka Enatsu, Masayuki Kakefu, Randy Bass, Taira Fujita, and many others.

== Koshien Stadium ==
The home field of the Tigers, Hanshin Koshien Stadium, is one of three major natural grass baseball stadiums in Japan. The others are the Mazda Zoom-Zoom Stadium Hiroshima (Hiroshima Toyo Carp), and Hotto Motto Field Kobe (part-time home of the Orix Buffaloes). Of the three, only Koshien has an all-dirt infield (the other two have an American-style infield.)

Koshien Stadium is the oldest ballpark in Japan; built in 1924, the stadium was once visited by American baseball legend Babe Ruth on a tour of Major League stars in 1934. There is a monument commemorating this visit within the stadium grounds, in an area called Mizuno Square.

== Curse of the Colonel ==
As with many other underachieving baseball teams, a curse was believed to lurk over the Tigers. In 1985, when the Tigers had just clinched the Central League pennant, fans celebrated by having people who looked like Tigers players jump into the Dōtonbori Canal. According to legend, because none of the fans resembled first baseman Randy Bass, fans grabbed a life-sized statue of the KFC mascot, Colonel Sanders, and threw it into the river (like Bass, the Colonel had a beard and was not Japanese). After this the Tigers managed to defeat the Seibu Lions in the 1985 Japan Series four games to three. After many seasons after the incident without a pennant win, the Tigers were said to be doomed never to win the season again until the Colonel was rescued from the river.

In 2003, when the Tigers returned to the Japan Series after 18 years with the best record in the Central League, many KFC outlets in Kōbe and Ōsaka moved their Colonel Sanders statues inside until the series was over to protect the statues from Tigers fans.

In 2005, like 2003, they clinched the pennant and made it back to the Japan Series, but lost to Bobby Valentine's Chiba Lotte Marines. They were outscored 33–4 in four games.

The top half of the Colonel Sanders statue (excluding both hands) was finally recovered on March 10, 2009, and the bottom half and right hand shortly after, in the canal by construction workers while constructing a new boardwalk area as part of a beautification project. The statue is still missing its left hand and glasses. The KFC outlet where this statue once stood has since closed; the statue is now at the KFC headquarters in Yokohama. It is not viewable by the public. Since then, the Hanshin Tigers made the 2014 Japan Series, but lost to the Fukuoka SoftBank Hawks in 5 games. The curse was finally broken, after the Hanshin Tigers managed to defeat the rival Orix Buffaloes in the 2023 Japan Series four games to three.

== Fandom ==
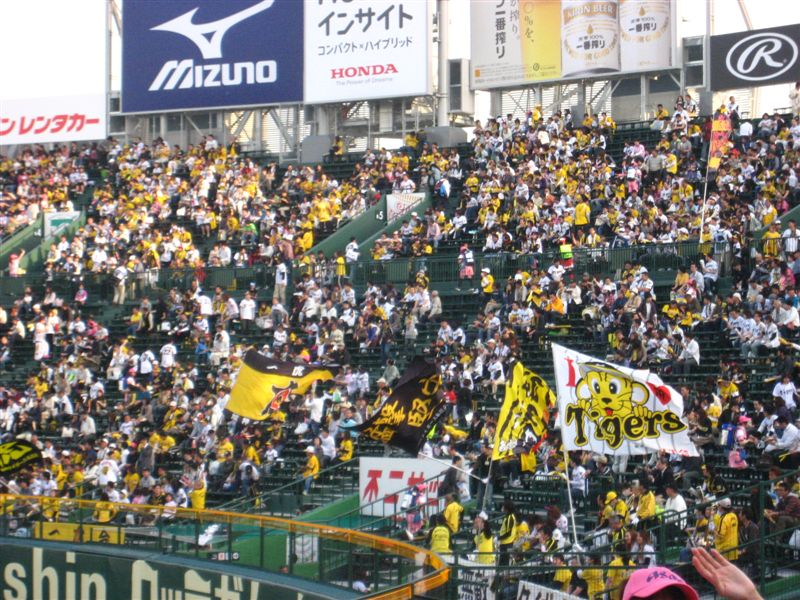
Tigers fans at a home game at Koshien Stadium

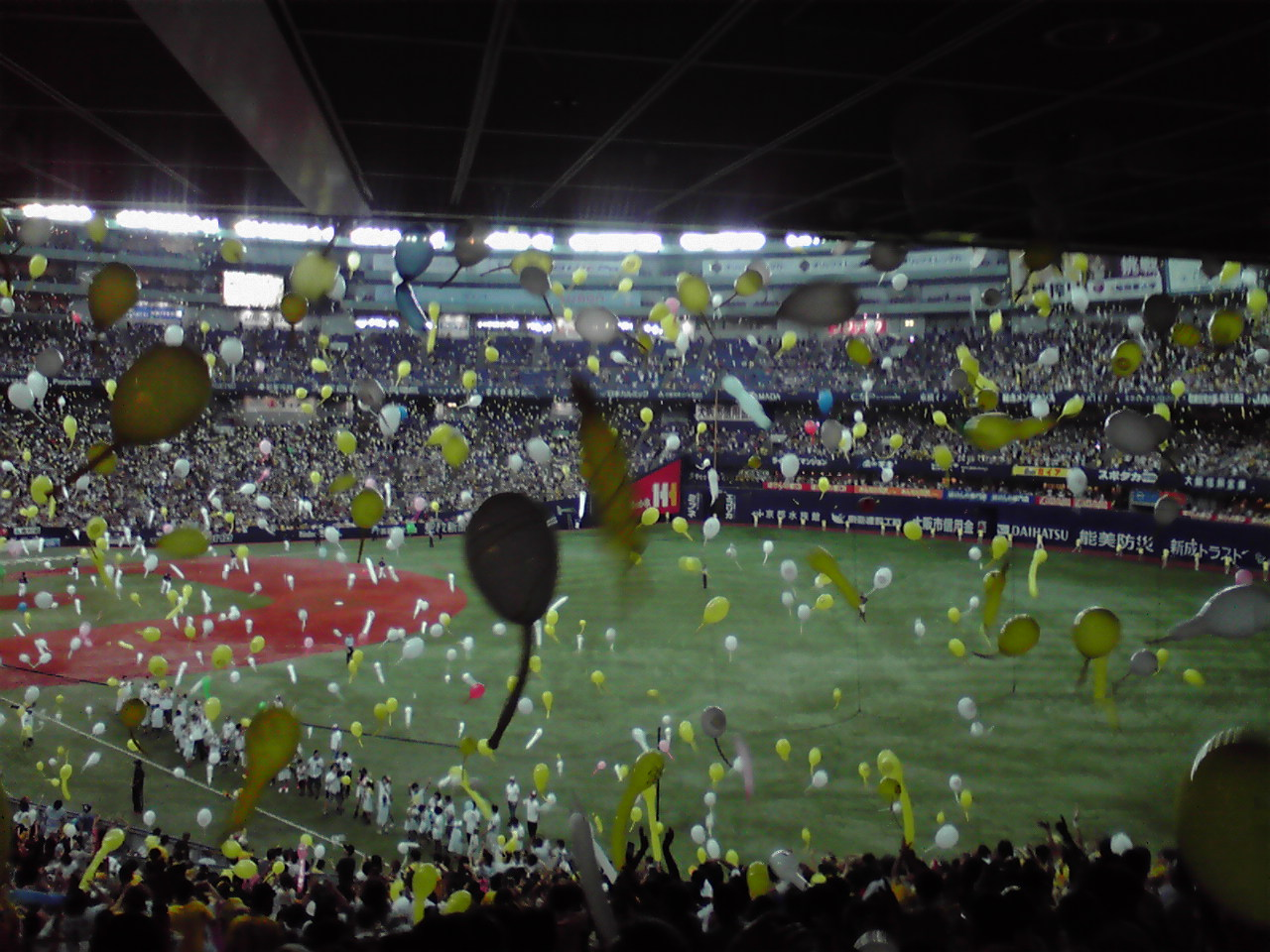
Tigers fans release balloons at the Kyocera Dome, the home stadium of the Orix Buffaloes.

Tigers fans are known as perhaps the most fanatical and dedicated fans in all of Japanese professional baseball. They often outnumber the home team fans at Tigers "away" games. Tigers fans also once had a reputation for rough behavior and a willingness to brawl with other fans or with each other, although fights are rare these days.

A famous Tigers fan tradition (done by other teams of NPB as well) is the release, by the fans, of hundreds of air-filled balloons immediately following the seventh-inning stretch and the singing of the Tigers' fight song. This tradition is carried out at all home and away games, except at games against the Yomiuri Giants in the Tokyo Dome due to the Giants' notoriously authoritarian and heavy-handed rules for controlling behavior by visiting fans.

The Tigers-Giants rivalry is considered the national Japanese rivalry, on par with the Dodgers-Giants and Red Sox-Yankees rivalries in Major League Baseball or El Clásico in Spanish football. The two teams have historically had a relatively close record of games with the Giants taking 1127 wins over the Tigers whereas the Tigers have taken 888 games over the Giants. 77 of the total games between the two have ended in tie.

=== Fight song ===
"The Hanshin Tigers' Song (阪神タイガースの歌, Hanshin Tigers no Uta)", as known as "Rokko Oroshi (六甲颪, 六甲おろし; lit. The (Downward) Wind of Mount Rokko)", lyrics by Sonosuke Sato (佐藤 惣之助) and composed by Yuji Koseki (古関 裕而), is a popular song in the Kansai area. It is the official fight song of the Tigers. In Japan, wind which blows down from a mountain is known to be cold and harsh, hence the song symbolizes the Tiger's brave challenge under hardship. The song can be found on karaoke boxes.

Japanese	Romaji	English
六甲颪(ろっこうおろし)に颯爽(さっそう)と 蒼天(そうてん)翔(か)ける日輪(にちりん)の 青春の覇気 美(うるわ)しく 輝く我が名ぞ 阪神タイガース オウ オウ オウオウ 阪神タイガース フレフレフレフレ 闘志(とうし)溌剌(はつらつ)起(た)つや今 熱血 既(すで)に敵を衝(つ)く 獣王の意気高らかに 無敵の我等ぞ 阪神タイガース オウ オウ オウオウ 阪神タイガース フレフレフレフレ 鉄腕強打幾千(いくち)度(た)び 鍛えてここに 甲子園 勝利に燃ゆる栄冠は 輝く我等ぞ 阪神タイガース オウ オウ オウオウ 阪神タイガース フレフレフレフレ	Rokkō oroshi ni sassō to Sōten kakeru nichirin no Seishun no haki uruwashiku Kagayaku wagana zo Hanshin Tigers; Ō-ō-ō-ō Hanshin Tigers; Fure-fure-fure-fure Tōshi hatsuratsu tatsu ya ima Nekketsu sude ni teki o tsuku Jūō no iki takaraka ni Muteki no warera zo Hanshin Tigers; Ō-ō-ō-ō Hanshin Tigers; Fure-fure-fure-fure Tetsuwan kyōda ikuchitabi Kitaete koko ni Kōshien; Shōri ni moyuru eikan wa Kagayaku warera zo Hanshin Tigers; Ō-ō-ō-ō Hanshin Tigers; Fure-fure-fure-fure	an official English version, not a direct translation Dashing swiftly through the wind blowin' from Rokko; Like the big sun soaring in the clear blue sky Mighty spirit of the youth shows the victor's grace The name that shines in glory "Hanshin Tigers"; Oh! Oh! Oh! Oh! Hanshin Tigers; Go, Go, Go, Go! Powerful hits and skillful pitch achieved a thousand times Trained with every discipline here at Koshien; Crowned with constant victory glorious, matchless feat Always proud, invincible "Hanshin Tigers"; Oh! Oh! Oh! Oh! Hanshin Tigers; Go, Go, Go, Go!

== Regular season records ==
Season	GP	W	L	T	%	GB	Finish	Playoffs
2016	143	64	76	3	.457	24.5	4th, Central	
2017	143	78	61	4	.561	10	2nd, Central	Lost Climax Series First Stage (BayStars), 1–2
2018	143	62	79	2	.440	20	6th, Central	Did not qualify
2019	143	69	68	6	.504	6	3rd, Central	Lost Climax Series Final Stage (Giants), 1–4
2020	120	60	53	7	.531	7.5	2nd, Central	Did not qualify
2021	143	77	56	10	.579	1	2nd, Central	Lost Climax Series First Stage (Giants), 0–2
2022	143	68	71	10	.579	12	3rd, Central	Lost Climax Series Final Stage (Swallows), 0–4
2023	143	85	53	5	.616	—	1st, Central	Won Japan Series (Buffaloes), 4–3
2024	143	74	63	6	.540	3.5	2nd, Central	Lost Climax Series First Stage (Baystars), 0–2
2025	143	85	54	4	.612	—	1st, Central	Lost Japan Series (Hawks), 1–4

== List of managers ==
Name	Term	Games	W	L	T	Win %
Shigeo Mori	1936 (Spring – Summer)	15	9	6	0	.600
Shuichi Ishimoto	1936–1939	307	223	78	6	.736
Kenjiro Matsuki	1940–1941 & 1950–1954	824	460	352	12	.565
Tadashi Wakabayashi	1942–1944 & 1947–1949	620	334	262	24	.558
Fumio Fujimura	1946 & 1956–1957	365	211	150	4	.584
Ichiro Kishi	1955	130	71	57	2	.554
Yoshio Tanaka	1958–1959	260	134	117	9	.533
Masayasu Kaneda	1960–1961 & 1973–1974	520	245	252	23	.493
Sadayoshi Fujimoto	1962–1965 & 1967–1968	822	437	365	20	.544
Shigeru Sugishita	1966	135	64	66	5	.493
Tsuguo Goto	1969 & 1978	260	109	139	12	.442
Minoru Murayama	1970–1972 & 1988–1989	650	310	321	19	.491
Yoshio Yoshida	1975–1977, 1985–1987 & 1997–1998	1051	484	511	56	.487
Don Blasingame	1979–1980	260	115	126	19	.479
Futoshi Nakanishi	1981	130	67	58	5	.535
Motoo Andoh	1982–1984	390	180	189	21	.488
Katsuhiro Nakamura	1990–1995	784	338	442	4	.434
Taira Fujita	1996	130	54	76	0	.415
Katsuya Nomura	1999–2001	411	169	238	4	.416
Senichi Hoshino	2002–2003	280	153	121	6	.557
Akinobu Okada	2004–2008 & 2023–2024	1004	554	423	27	.567
Akinobu Mayumi	2009–2011	432	213	206	13	.508
Yutaka Wada	2012–2015	575	273	281	21	.493
Tomoaki Kanemoto	2016–2018	429	204	216	9	.486
Akihiro Yano	2019–2022	143	274	248	27	.525
Kyuji Fujikawa	2025–present	143	85	54	4	.612

== Current roster ==
Hanshin Tigers roster
First team		Second team
Pitchers: 13 Suguru Iwazaki; 14 Yuta Iwasada; 18 Takato Ihara; 27 Masashi Ito; 29 Haruto Takahashi; 35 Hiroto Saiki; 37 Masaki Oyokawa; 41 Shoki Murakami; 42 Easton Lucas; 47 Takuma Kirishiki; 54 Rito Kinoshita; 65 Atsuki Yuasa; 69 Daichi Ishii; 98 Rafael Dolis; Catchers: 2 Ryutaro Umeno; 12 Seishiro Sakamoto; 39 Yuki Sakaeda; 68 Hayato Nakagawa	Infielders: 0 Seiya Kinami; 3 Yusuke Ohyama; 4 Takahiro Kumagai; 7 Takumu Nakano; 8 Teruaki Satō; 9 Masahiro Tateishi; 24 Cam Devanney; 38 Ryūhei Obata; 62 Kai Ueda; 67 Nozomu Takatera; Outfielders: 1 Shōta Morishita; 5 Kōji Chikamoto; 53 Kairi Shimada; 61 Hiroshi Toyoda; 92 Kein Fukushima; Manager: 22 Kyuji Fujikawa; Coaches Head coach: 74 Atsushi Fujimoto; Pitching chief: 88 Yuya Andoh; Pitching: 73 Satoru Kanemura; Battery: 87 Katsunori Nomura; Hitting: 71 Hiroki Uemoto; 83 Eiichi Koyano; Infield defense/Base running: 70 Shuta Tanaka; Outfield defense/Base running/Analytical: 96 Sō Tsutsui; First squad/Second squad batting coordinator: 86 Yutaka Wada	Pitchers: 16 Yuki Nishi; 19 Kaito Shimomura; 20 Jon Duplantier; 21 Kotaro Otake; 26 Tsuyoshi Shiiba; 28 Yuki Kesamaru; 30 Keito Mombetsu; 36 Seishu Hatake; 44 Saku Hayase; 46 Carson Ragsdale; 48 Hidetoshi Ibaragi; 49 Taisei Kudō; 50 Ren Tomida; 51 Daiki Hayakawa; 55 Shuto Noto; 63 Yuya Ishiguro; 64 Hidetaka Okadome; 66 Junya Tsuda; 92 Riku Kawahara; 95 Ryōsuke Jingu; 97 Anderson Severino; 99 Dauri Moreta; Catchers: 17 Torai Fushimi; 43 Hayato Machida; 57 Kenya Nagasaka; 59 Kento Fujita; 85 Rinshiro Shimamura	Infielders: 00 Hiyu Motoyama; 25 Shogo Tanihata; 33 Kento Itohara; 45 Taiyo Sano; 52 Shuya Yamada; 56 Aoi Momosaki; Outfielders: 32 Taiki Hamada; 34 Kaisei Okashiro; 40 Hinase Itsubo; 58 Ukyō Maegawa; 60 Dan Onodera; 94 Dermis García; Manager: 78 Katsuo Hirata; Coaches Pitching chief: 90 Tomoyuki Kubota; Pitching: 72 Hirotaka Egusa; 89 Ryo Watanabe; Battery: 84 Takeshi Hidaka; Hitting/Analytical: 91 Hirotoshi Kitagawa; Hitting: 77 Eishin Soyogi; Defense/Base running: 81 Toshifumi Baba; Infield defense/Base running: 75 Noriharu Yamazaki; Outfield defense/Base running: 76 Takahito Kudo; Batter: 79 Shunsuke
Development Players
120 Junya Nishi (OF); 121 Reiji Toi (IF); 122 Ippei Ogawa (P); 123 Kai Matsubara (P); 125 Ryo Itoh (P); 129 Shōei Yamasaki (OF); 130 Toshiaki Kawasaki (IF); 132 Anthony Martinez (P); 133 Jean Arnaez (IF); 134 Stanley Consuegra (OF)
Updated January 15, 2026		→ All NPB rosters

== Players of note ==
=== Former players ===
- (Japan) Shinjiro Hiyama (桧山 進次郎) – OF
- (Japan) Norihiro Akahoshi (赤星 憲広) – OF
- (Japan) Kenji Johjima (城島 健司) – C
- (United States) George Altman – OF
- (Japan) Sohachi Aniya (安仁屋 宗八) – P
- (United States) George Arias – IF
- (United States) Scott Atchison – P
- (United States) Gene Bacque – P
- (United States) Randy Bass – IF
- (Japan) Kaoru Betto (別当 薫) – OF
- (South Korea) Oh Seung-hwan (吳 昇桓) – P
- (Germany) Mike Blowers – IF
- (United States) Jamie Brown – P
- (United States) Darnell Coles – IF, OF
- (United States) Doug Creek – P
- (Puerto Rico) Iván Cruz – IF
- (United States) Glenn Davis
- (United States) Rob Deer – OF
- (Japan) Yutaka Enatsu (江夏 豊) – P
- (United States) Tom Evans – IF
- (United States) Cecil Fielder – IF
- (United States) Lew Ford – OF
- (Japan) Atsushi Fujimoto (藤本 敦士) – IF
- (Japan) Fumio Fujimura (藤村 富美男) – P, IF
- (Japan) Taira Fujita – IF (藤田 平)
- (United States) Rich Gale – P
- (United States) Mike Greenwell – OF
- (Taiwan) Shosei Go (呉 昌征) – OF
- (United States) Dave Hansen – IF
- (United States) Jason Hardtke – IF
- (United States) Phil Hiatt – IF
- (Japan) Katsumi Hirosawa (広澤 克実) – IF, OF
- (United States) Trey Hodges – P
- (Japan) Osamu Hoshino (星野 修, 星野 おさむ) – IF
- (Japan) Nobuyuki Hoshino (星野 伸之) – P
- (Japan) Makoto Imaoka (今岡 誠) – IF
- (Japan) Kei Igawa (井川 慶) – P
- (Japan) Atsunori Itoh (伊藤 敦規) – P
- (United States) Mark Johnson – IF, OF
- (Japan) Masaru Kageura (景浦 將) – OF, IF, P
- (Japan) Masayuki Kakefu (掛布 雅之) – IF
- (Japan) Tsuyoshi Shimoyanagi (下柳 剛) – P
- (Japan) Tsutomu Kameyama (亀山 努, 亀山 つとむ) – OF
- (Japan) Tomoaki Kanemoto (金本 知憲) – OF
- (Japan) Atsushi Kataoka (片岡 篤史) – IF
- (Japan) Tetsuro Kawajiri (川尻 哲郎) – P
- (Japan) Kozo Kawato (川藤 幸三) – PH, OF
- (United States) Matt Keough – P
- (Japan) Katsuhiko Kido (木戸 克彦) – C
- (United States) Mike Kinkade – IF
- (United States) Willie Kirkland – OF
- (Japan) Masaaki Koyama (小山 正明) – P
- (Taiwan) Kuo Lee Chien-Fu (郭李 建夫) – P
- (Japan) Kojiro Machida (町田 公二郎) – OF
- (Japan) Kenjiro Matsuki (松木 謙治郎) – IF
- (United States) Darrell May – P
- (Japan) Akinobu Mayumi (真弓 明信) – IF, OF
- (Japan) Susumu Mikoshiba (御子柴 進) – P
- (United States) Kurt Miller – P
- (Japan) Toyozo Minamimure (南牟礼 豊蔵) – IF, OF
- (Japan) Takao Misonoo (御園生 崇男) – P
- (United States) Trey Moore – P
- (Dominican Republic) Ramón Morel – P
- (Japan) Minoru Murayama (村山 実) – P
- (United States) Rodney Myers – P
- (Japan) Yutaka Nakamura (中村 豊) – OF
- (Japan) Kiyooki Nakanishi (中西 清起) – P
- (Japan) Toshihiro Noguchi (野口 寿浩) – C
- (Japan) Atsushi Nomi (能見 篤史) – P
- (Japan) Satoru Nakano (中野 佐資) – OF
- (Japan) Akinobu Okada (岡田 彰布) – IF
- (United States) Tom O'Malley – IF
- (United States) Curtis Olsen – P
- (Australia) Chris Oxspring – P
- (United States) Eduardo Pérez – IF
- (United States) Larry Parrish – IF
- (United States) Alonzo Powell – OF
- (United States) Mike Reinbach – OF
- (United States) Jerrod Riggan – P
- (Dominican Republic) Bienvenido Rivera – OF
- (Japan) Tsuyoshi Shinjo (新庄 剛志) – OF
- (United States) Shane Spencer – OF
- (Japan) Kento Sugiyama (杉山 賢人) – P
- (Japan) Koichi Tabuchi (田淵 幸一) – C
- (Taiwan) Yasuaki Taiho (大豊 泰昭, 陳 大豐) – IF
- (Japan) Yasushi Tao (田尾 安志) – OF
- (Japan) Shuta Tanaka (田中 秀太, 秀太) – IF
- (United States) Tony Tarasco – OF
- (Japan) Katsunori Tomari (渡真利 克則) – IF, OF
- (Japan) Shoji Toyama (遠山 奬志) – P
- (Japan) Tomochika Tsuboi (坪井 智哉) – OF
- (United States) Marc Valdes – P
- (United States) Ryan Vogelsong – P
- (Japan) Yutaka Wada (和田 豊) – IF
- (Japan) Tadashi Wakabayashi (若林 忠志) – P
- (Australia) Jeff Williams – P
- (United States) Craig Worthington – IF
- (United States) Marvell Wynne – OF
- (Japan) Keiichi Yabu (藪 恵壹) – P
- (Japan) Hiroshi Yagi (八木 裕) – IF, OF, PH
- (Japan) Kazuyuki Yamamoto (山本 和行) – P
- (Japan) Kazuhiro Yamauchi (山内 一弘) – OF
- (Japan) Akihiro Yano (矢野 輝弘, 矢野 耀大) – C
- (Japan) Hiroshi Yoshida (吉田 浩) – OF
- (Japan) Yoshio Yoshida (吉田 義男) – IF
- (Japan) Toshiro Yufune (湯舟 敏郎) – P
- (Japan) Kōyō Aoyagi (青柳 晃洋) – P
- (Japan) Kazuyuki Yamamoto (山本 和行) – P
- (Japan) Kyuji Fujikawa (藤川 球児) – P
- (Japan) Takumi Akiyama (秋山 拓巳) – P
- (United States) Sheldon Neuse – OF

=== Retired numbers ===
Number	Player	Position	Tenure
10	(Japan) Fumio Fujimura (藤村 富美男)	IF / P Manager	1936–1938, 1943–1956, 1958; 1946, 1955–1957
11	(Japan) Minoru Murayama (村山 実)	Pitcher; Manager	1959–1972; 1970–1972, 1988–1989
23	(Japan) Yoshio Yoshida (吉田 義男)	SS; Manager	1953–1969; 1969, 1975–1977, 1985–1987, 1997–1998

=== MLB players ===
- Kenji Johjima (2006–2009)
- Ryan Vogelsong (2000–2006, 2011–2017)
- Tsuyoshi Shinjo (2001–2003)
- Keiichi Yabu (2005, 2008)
- Masanori Murakami (1964–1965)
- Cecil Fielder (1989)
- Glenn Davis (1984–1993)
- Chris Oxspring (2005)
- Kei Igawa (2007–2010)
- Marvell Wynne (1983–1990)
- Craig Worthington (1988–1992, 1995–1996)
- Jeff Williams (1999–2002)
- Marc Valdes (1995–1998, 2000–2001)
- Tony Tarasco (1993–1999, 2002)
- Jerrod Riggan (2000–2003)
- Alonzo Powell (1987, 1991)
- Matt Murton (2005–2009)
- Leon McFadden (1972)
- Oh Seung-hwan (2016–2019)
- Kyuji Fujikawa (2013–2015)
- Pierce Johnson (2020–present)
- Robert Suarez (2022–present)
- Shintaro Fujinami (2023–2025)
- Koyo Aoyagi (2025)

== Media relating to the Tigers ==
=== Mascots ===
To Lucky (トラッキー, Torakkii) is a mascot character of the Tigers. With his girlfriend Lucky, he entertains spectators at team games. His uniform number is 1985, because his first appearance was in 1985. His name is a combination of two separate Japanese words, Tora (トラ), meaning tiger and Rakkii (ラッキー) meaning lucky. His name therefore means "lucky tiger" in Japanese.

To Lucky's first appearance was on the screen at Hanshin Koshien Stadium in 1985. He appeared as a live-action character in 1987. His design was updated in 1992.

Aside from To Lucky, the other mascots of the Tigers are Lucky (ラッキー Rakkii), his girlfriend, and the most recent addition, Keeta (キー太), Lucky's little brother. Keeta's uniform number is 2011, because he was introduced to the Tigers in 2011. He wears a backwards cap. Lucky's cap is pink unlike her boyfriend's and his little brother's.

=== Newspapers ===
- Daily Sports (published by the Kobe Shimbun, except Hiroshima region)
- Nikkan Sports (affiliated company of the Asahi Shimbun, Kansai region)
- Sankei Sports (published by the Sankei Shimbun Osaka Head Office)
- Sports Nippon (affiliated company of the Mainichi Shimbun, Kansai region)

=== Stations ===
Broadcasting:

- Mainichi Broadcasting System, Inc.
- Asahi Broadcasting Corporation
- Kansai Telecasting Corporation
- Yomiuri Telecasting Corporation
- Television Osaka, Inc.
- SUN-TV

== See also ==
- Central League
- Western League
- Hankyu Hanshin Toho Group – Hanshin Electric Railway Co., Ltd.
- Tampere Tigers
