= Shunsuke Fujikawa =

Japanese baseball player (born 1987)

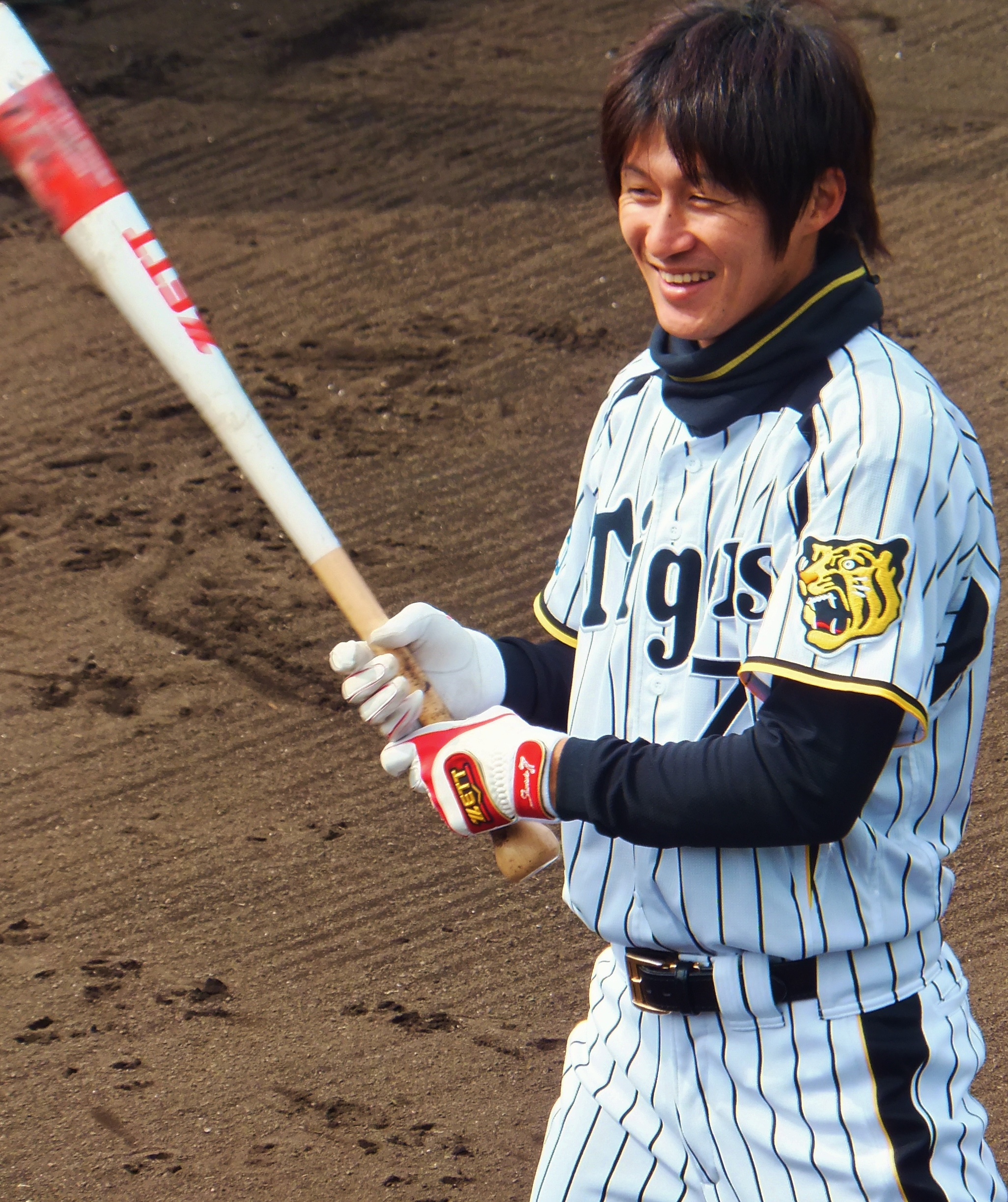
- Shunsuke with the Hanshin Tigers

Hanshin Tigers – No. 79
- Outfielder / Coach
- Born: August 17, 1987 (age 38); Fukuoka, Japan
- Bats: Right Throws: Right

NPB debut
- March 26, 2010, for the Hanshin Tigers

NPB statistics (through 2020 season)
- Batting average: .249
- Home runs: 9
- Hits: 310
- RBI: 86
- Stolen bases: 28
- Stats at Baseball Reference

Teams
- As player: Hanshin Tigers (2010–2021); As coach: Hanshin Tigers (2025–present)

Shunsuke Fujikawa (藤川 俊介, Fujikawa Shunsuke), known simply as Shunsuke (俊介, Shunsuke) to some fans, is a Japanese professional baseball outfielder. He was born on August 17, 1987, in Fukuoka, Japan. He is currently playing for the Hanshin Tigers of the NPB.
