= Kobe Shimbun =

Japanese newspaper

- Front page of the evening edition of the Kobe Shimbun following the Great Hanshin Earthquake on January 17, 1995
- Native name: 神戸新聞
- Type: Daily newspaper
- Format: Broadsheet
- President: Shuichi Kajioka
- Staff writers: 200
- Founded: February 11, 1898
- Political alignment: Liberal
- Language: Japanese
- Headquarters: 1-5-7 Higashi-Kawasaki-cho, Chuo-ku, Kobe, Hyogo Prefecture, Japan
- City: Kobe
- Country: Japan
- Circulation: Morning edition: 320,432; Evening edition: 80,975; (as of December 2025)
- Sister newspapers: Daily Sports
- Website: www.kobe-np.co.jp

The Kobe Shimbun (Japanese: 神戸新聞, Hepburn: Kōbe Shinbun) is a Japanese-language daily newspaper based in Kobe, Hyogo Prefecture, Japan, and the company publishing that newspapers is also called The Kobe Shimbun Company (株式会社神戸新聞社, Kabushiki-gaisha Kōbe Shinbunsha). It runs the website Kobe Shimbun NEXT. The publication also runs the sports newspaper Daily Sports.

== History ==
Kobe Shimbun was founded on February 11, 1898, by Yoshitaro Kawasaki, the owner of the Kawasaki Heavy Industries. On August 1, 1931, it merged with the Osaka Jiji Shimpō and Kyoto Nichinichi Shimbun to form the Santōgōdo Shimbun. Kobe Shimbun was separated in 1935. During the American bombing of Kobe in World War II, the company headquarters in Higashi-kawasaki-cho in the city was destroyed. The Asahi Shimbun Company took over printing. It was rebuilt on October 14, 1945. On August 1, 1948, it launched the Daily Sports, but later separated publication in 1955. On May 3, 1956, the company moved their head office to Kobe Shimbun Kaikan. The building is considered to be symbol of the Sannomiya district of Kobe, and a symbol of the post-war reconstruction in Kobe.

The publication signed an agreement in 1994 with the The Kyoto Shimbun, aiding each other in case of emergency. A year later, on January 17, 1995, Great Hanshin earthquake struck the Kansai region. 12 staff were injured. Three hours later, the publication's printing office was destroyed, and the staff telephoned the The Kyoto Shimbun asking for help. The Kyoto Shimbun Company helped print the 520,000 daily copies of their newspaper, albeit reducing the evening edition from 12 to 16 pages to four pages, and from 24 to 32 pages to eight pages for the morning edition. The paper was delivered to the affected area by January 18. The Kyoto Shimbun Company also helped produce negatives for the publication. The Kobe Shimbun connected with The Kyoto Shimbun via two telephone lines for an entire day, and the top editor of the publication read articles over the phone to the layout editors.

The building was later demolished, but rebuilt as "Mint Kobe" on October 4, 2006. On March 11, 2010, Daily Sports was merged with Kobe Shimbun, and was relaunched on December 1, 2012. On November 1, 2012, the newspaper launched the Kobe Shimbun NEXT, the online edition of the newspaper.

== Contents ==
The editorial position of the Kobe Shimbun has been described as liberal. Historically, the newspaper was described to have an "anti-foreign bias" for its coverage of the arrest of Christian Holstein in 1914.

The website publishes morning and evening editions daily. As of December 2025, the morning edition sold 320,432 copies, while the evening edition sold 80,975 copies.

== Notable reporting and incidents ==
Kobe Shimbun, alongside Kobe Yushin Nippō, published a series of articles about the arrest of a Kobe-based German merchant, Christian Holstein, about the alleged kidnapping of Kanekichi Tsukamura in 1914.

In 1985, the Kobe Shimbun and Tianjin Daily organized a media tie-up.

== Gallery ==
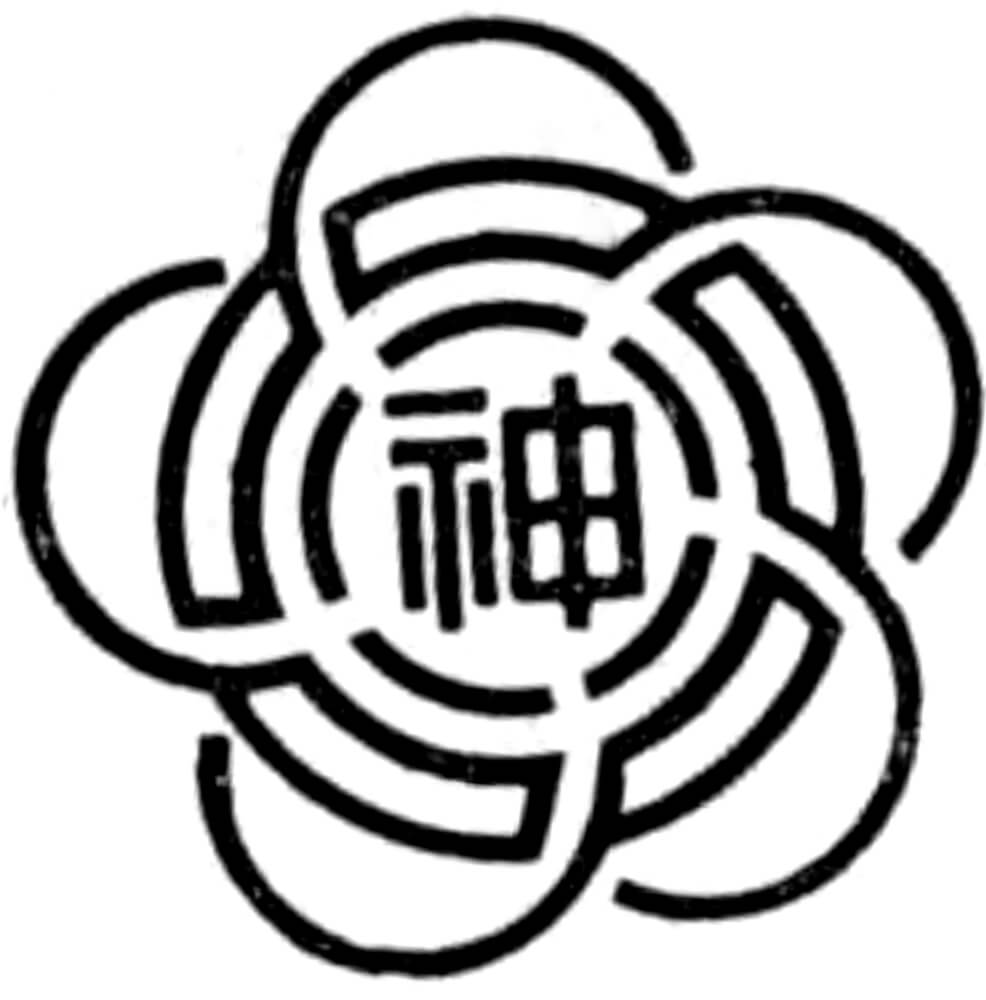
Former insignia of the company

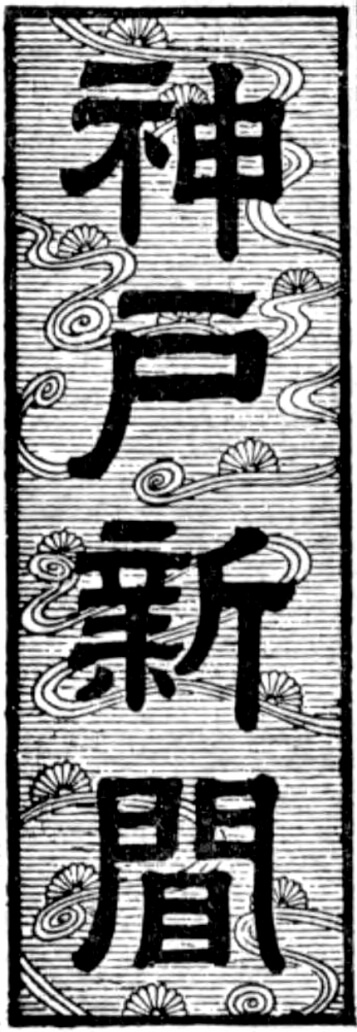
Masthead

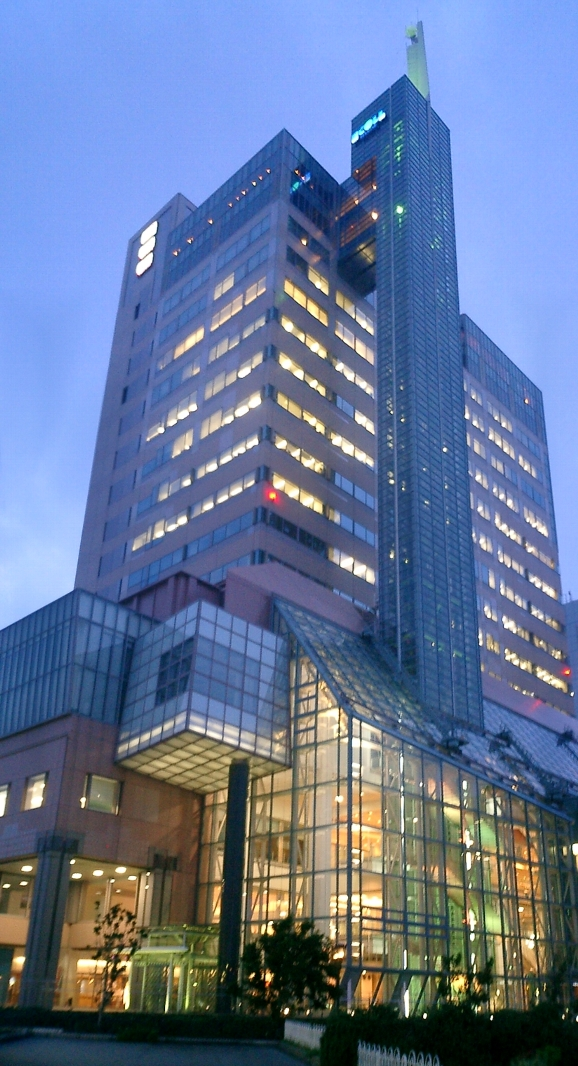
ECOLL MARINE. The headquarters of Kobe Shimbunsha is located in this building.

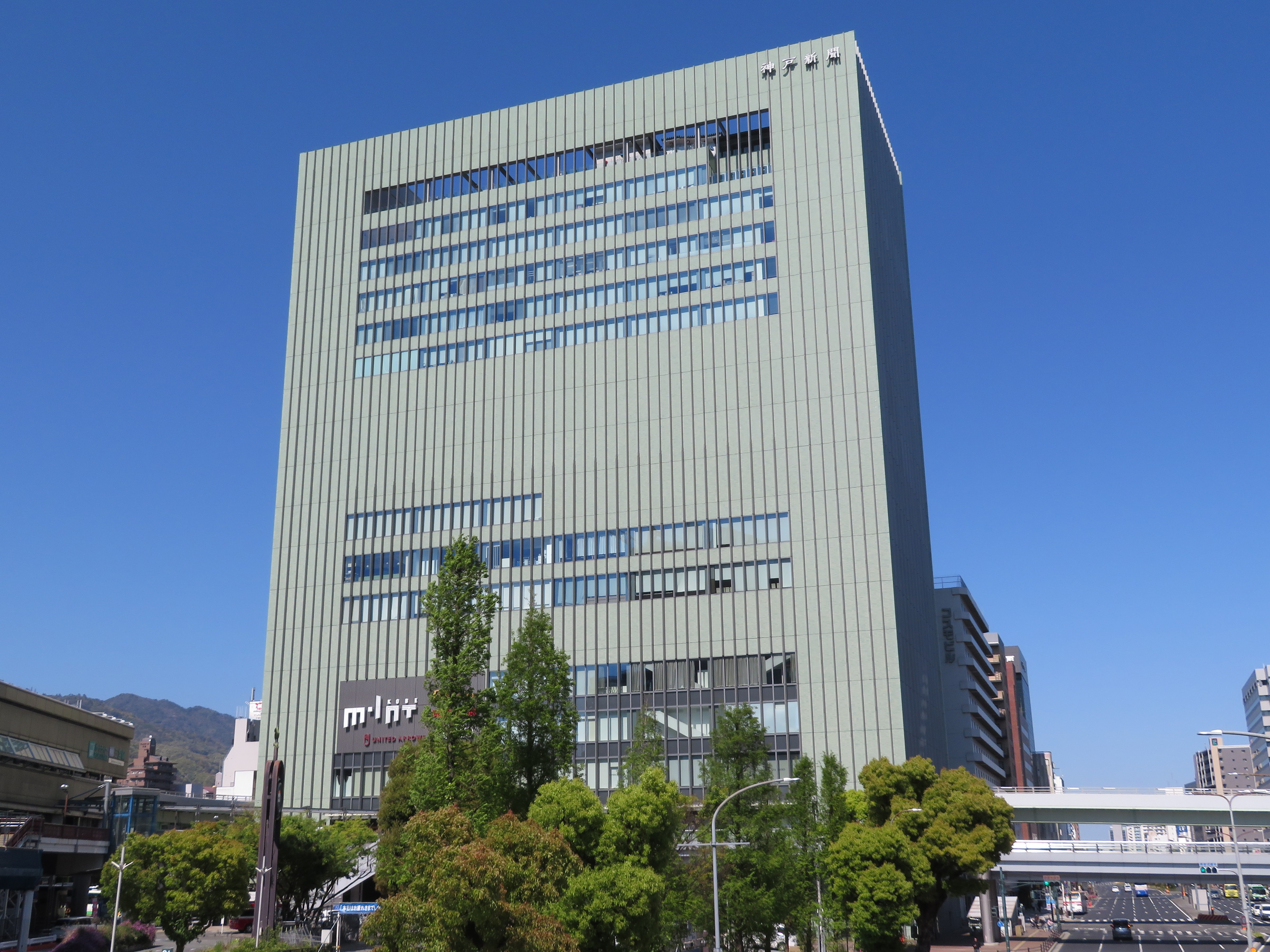
Mint Kobe in 2020

== See also ==
- Kobe Shimbun Hai
