= Kenjiro Matsuki =

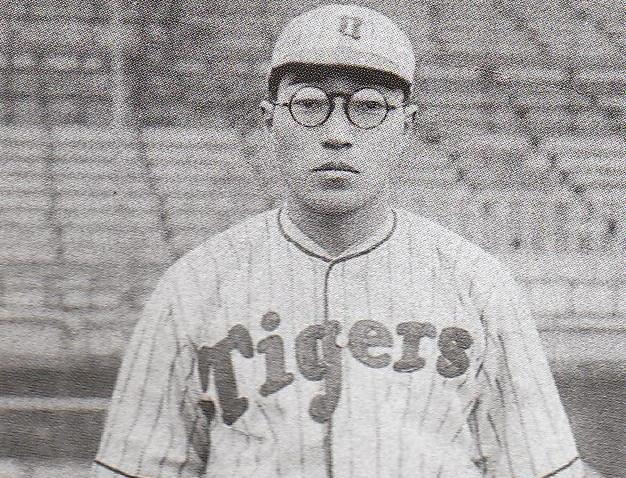
- First baseman / Manager
- Born: January 22, 1909; Tsuruga, Fukui, Japan
- Died: February 21, 1986 (aged 77)
- Batted: Left Threw: Left

JPBL/NPB statistics
- Batting average: .263
- Home runs: 18
- Hits: 448
- Runs batted in: 224
- Games managed: 1,255
- Managerial record: 628-602
- Winning %: .511

Former teams
- As player: Osaka/Hanshin Tigers (1936-1941, 1950-1951); As manager: Osaka/Hanshin Tigers (1940-1941, 1950-1954); Daiei Stars/Unions (1956-1957); Toei Flyers (1969-1970)

Career highlights and awards
- 2x Japanese Baseball League champion (1937f-1938s)

Member of the Japanese

Baseball Hall of Fame
- Induction: 1978

Kenjiro Matsuki (松木 謙治郎, Matsuki Kenjiro; January 22, 1909 – February 21, 1986) was a Japanese baseball first baseman and manager. He played for the Osaka/Hanshin Tigers from 1936 until 1941, when he was drafted into World War II. He returned as a player-manager, a role he possessed in 1940 and 1941, for 1950 and 1951. He served as a non-playing manager of the Tigers from 1952 until 1954, the Daiei Stars/Unions for 1956 and 1957, and the Toei Flyers for 1969 and 1970.

He was inducted into the Japanese Baseball Hall of Fame in 1978.

== Early life ==
Matsuki was born on January 22, 1909, in Tsuruga, Fukui. He attended Meiji University and played baseball there. While on the university's team, he played against American universities.

== Playing career ==
Prior to playing professionally, he played in industrial leagues. He also played on a team consisting of Japanese All-Stars in 1934, which played United States Major League Baseball All-Stars, including Lou Gehrig and Babe Ruth.

Matsuki played for the Osaka Tigers' first seasons. For the 1937 spring season, Matsuki led the Japanese Baseball League with a .338 batting average and four home runs. In that year's fall season, Matsuki tied for first on his team with three home runs on their way to winning the second-ever Japanese Baseball League, which they won again in the 1938 spring season. In that year's fall season, Matsuki led the league with 35 runs and led the team with four home runs. 1939 saw Matsuki become one of the Tigers' most valuable offensive players, leading the team in batting average, runs, hits, and walks. In 1940, Matsuki became the player manager of the newly named Hanshin Tigers. He led the team to a 64-37-3 record, and a second-place finish in the league. This year, his offensive performance somewhat regressed, leading the team only in sacrifice flies. The next year, he led the team to a 41–43 record and a fifth-place finish and did not lead the team in any offensive category.

That year, Matsuki resigned after he was drafted to serve for Japan in World War II. During the Battle of Okinawa, he was wounded and captured by American forces. He returned as the player manager of the Tigers in 1949, beginning his tenure in the 1950 season. It was clear that his playing ability was diminishing. Aged 41, he had thirteen plate appearances for three hits and two walks. He led the team to a 70-67-3 record, and a fourth-place finish in the Central League. In 1951, he recorded only one at-bat, which resulted in an out. The team went 61-52-3, good for third in the league. 1951 would be the final year he played in a professional game.

== Managerial career ==
=== Osaka/Hanshin Tigers ===
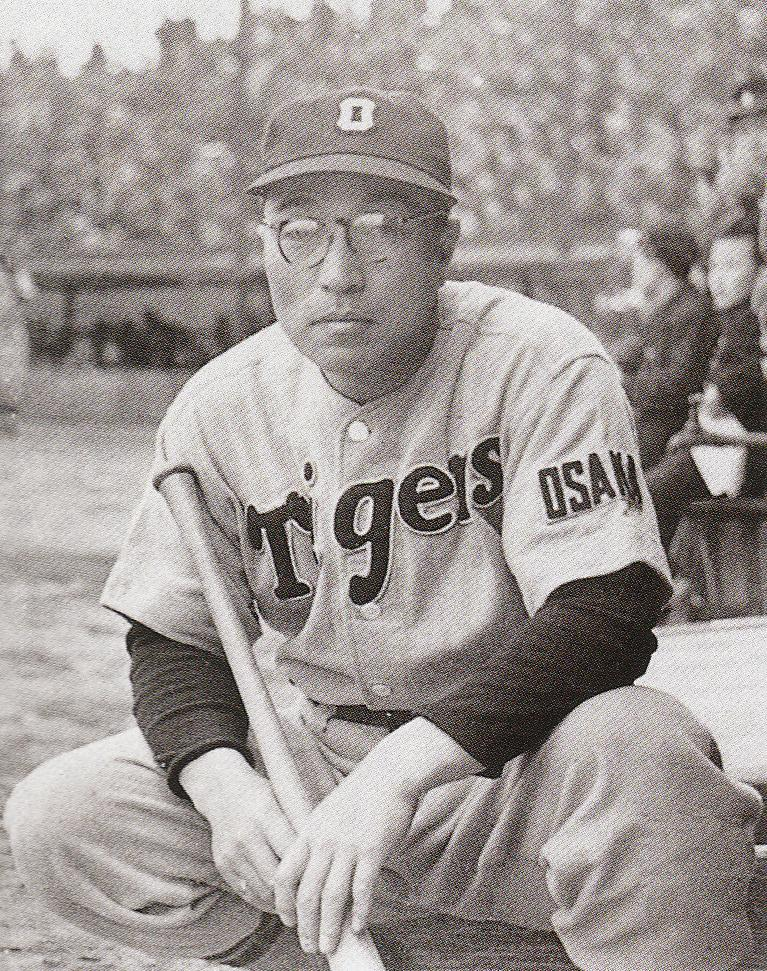
Matsuki while managing the Tigers, c. 1952-1953

Though he was no longer a player manager, he continued to be the manager of the Tigers. Under his leadership, the Tigers went 79-40-1 and finished second in the league in 1952, 74-56 and second place in the league in 1953, and 71-57-2 and third place in the league in 1954. He was replaced by Ichiro Kishi following that result.

=== Daiei Stars/Unions ===
Matsuki became manager of the Daiei Stars in 1956. The team finished 57-94-3 and finished seventh in the Pacific League. The following season, the team, now called the Daiei Unions, went 41-89-2 and finished last in the league. The team then merged with the Mainichi Orions to form the Daimai Orions in 1958.

=== Toei Flyers ===
Twelve years after his last season, Matsuki took the helm of the Toei Flyers. For the 1969 season, the team went 57-70-3 and finished fourth in the league. The next season, the team went 54-70-6 and finished fifth in the league. Kenjiro Tamiya replaced him the following season.

== Post-baseball career ==
Matsuki wrote a book about his experiences during the war in 1974, entitled Matsuki Ittohei no Okinawa Horyoki (English: Pfc. Matsuki's Tale as a Prisoner on Okinawa). In 1978, he was inducted into the Japanese Baseball Hall of Fame. He died on February 21, 1986, at the age of 77.

== Published works ==
- Matsuki, Kenjiro (1974). Matsuki Ittohei no Okinawa Horyoki (Pfc. Matsuki's Tale as a Prisoner on Okinawa). Tokyo: Kobunsha.
