= Daily Sports (Japanese newspaper) =

Japanese sports newspaper

- Type: Daily newspaper
- Format: Broadsheet
- Language: Japanese
- Headquarters: Kobe
- Country: Japan
- Website: www.daily.co.jp

Daily Sports (Japanese: デイリースポーツ) is a Japanese daily newspaper, which first published on August 1, 1948, and today also exists in a news website version, at Daily.co.jp. As its title suggests, it is primarily devoted to sports journalism, but also carries some entertainment and other news. Its operations are headquartered in Chuo-ku, Kobe, and its publisher also maintains offices in Tokyo, Osaka, Hiroshima, and Takamatsu. Daily Sports's more general-audience sister newspaper is Kobe Shimbun, with close corporate ties, though they are technically operated by separate registered companies at the same address. The legal publisher of Daily Sports is Daily Sports Quality Inc. (株式会社デイリースポーツ・クオリティ), with ¥10 million in operating capital and 206 employees as of 2018. The publication is unrelated to the somewhat similarly named Daily News Online (デイリーニュースオンライン)
