= Hiroki Uemoto =

Japanese baseball player (born 1986)

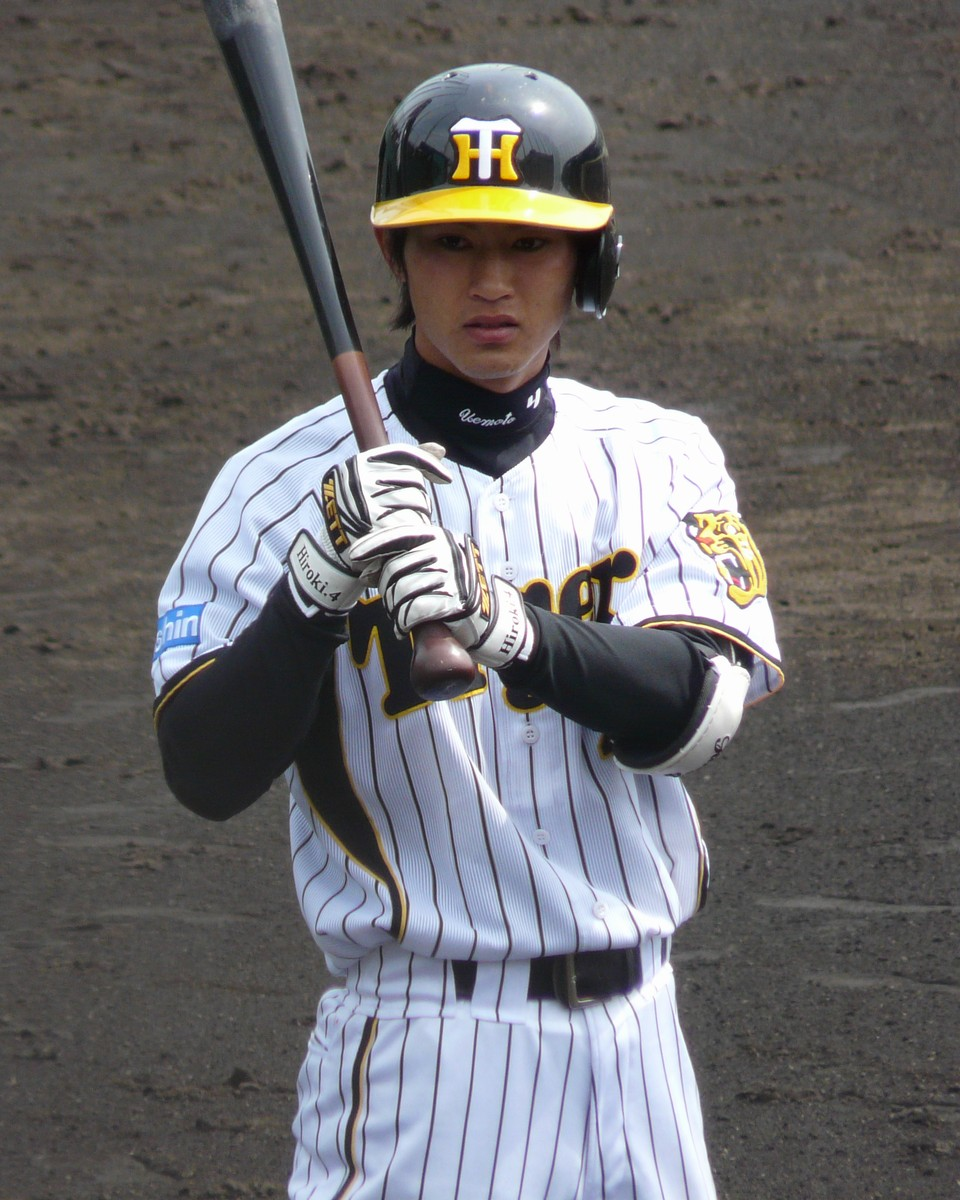
- Uemoto with the Hanshin Tigers

Hanshin Tigers – No. 71
- Infielder / Coach
- Born: July 4, 1986 (age 40); Fukuyama, Hiroshima
- Batted: Right Threw: Right

NPB debut
- July 8, 2010, for the Hanshin Tigers

Last NPB appearance
- September 26, 2020, for the Hanshin Tigers

NPB statistics (through 2020 season)
- Batting average: .265
- Home runs: 30
- Hits: 522
- RBI: 161
- Stolen bases: 94
- Stats at Baseball Reference

Teams
- As player: Hanshin Tigers (2009–2020); As coach: Hanshin Tigers (2024–present)

Hiroki Uemoto (上本 博紀, Uemoto Hiroki; born July 4, 1986) is a Japanese former professional baseball player. He has played in his entire career with the Nippon Professional Baseball (NPB) for the Hanshin Tigers.

== Early baseball career ==
Uemoto attended Koryo High School, where his team participated in the summer National Championship in his first and second years and the spring National Invitational Tournament in his second and third years. In 2003, he played alongside high-school sluggers Kentaro Nishimura and Yuta Shirahama to win the championship for their school. In his second year he was selected to participate in the Asia AAA Baseball Championship where he won the Top Defensive Player award. During the 2004 National Invitational High-school Baseball Tournament, he served as team captain and played catcher.

== Professional career ==
Hanshin Tigers selected Uemoto with the third selection in the 2008 NPB draft.

In the sixth inning of a Hanshin vs. Samurai Japan practice game on February 26, 2013, he collided with left fielder Hayata Ito while chasing a ball hit by Hayato Sakamoto. Ito caught the ball despite the collision and was able to continue playing, but Uemoto was taken off the field on a stretcher. He was diagnosed with an injury to his anterior talofibular ligament. He underwent rehabilitation starting in March, returning to practice in mid-May. Because of occasional pain still felt in his left ankle, he underwent surgery in June.

His first appearance following surgery was on August 29 against the Giants in the Tokyo Dome, where he played third base for the first time. Five days later he hit his first home run of the year against the BayStars. During the September 18 game against Hiroshima, he played against his brother Takashi for the first time; he as the 2nd baseman and his brother as the Carp's shortstop. In the 2013 season, he played 25 games with 8 RBIs and 2 home runs.

On December 2, 2020, he become a free agent. On December 21, 2020, he announced his retirement.

On October 25, 2023 it was announced he'd be returning to the Tigers as a coach for the 2024 season.
