= 2019 Nippon Professional Baseball draft =

2019 Nippon Professional Baseball Draft
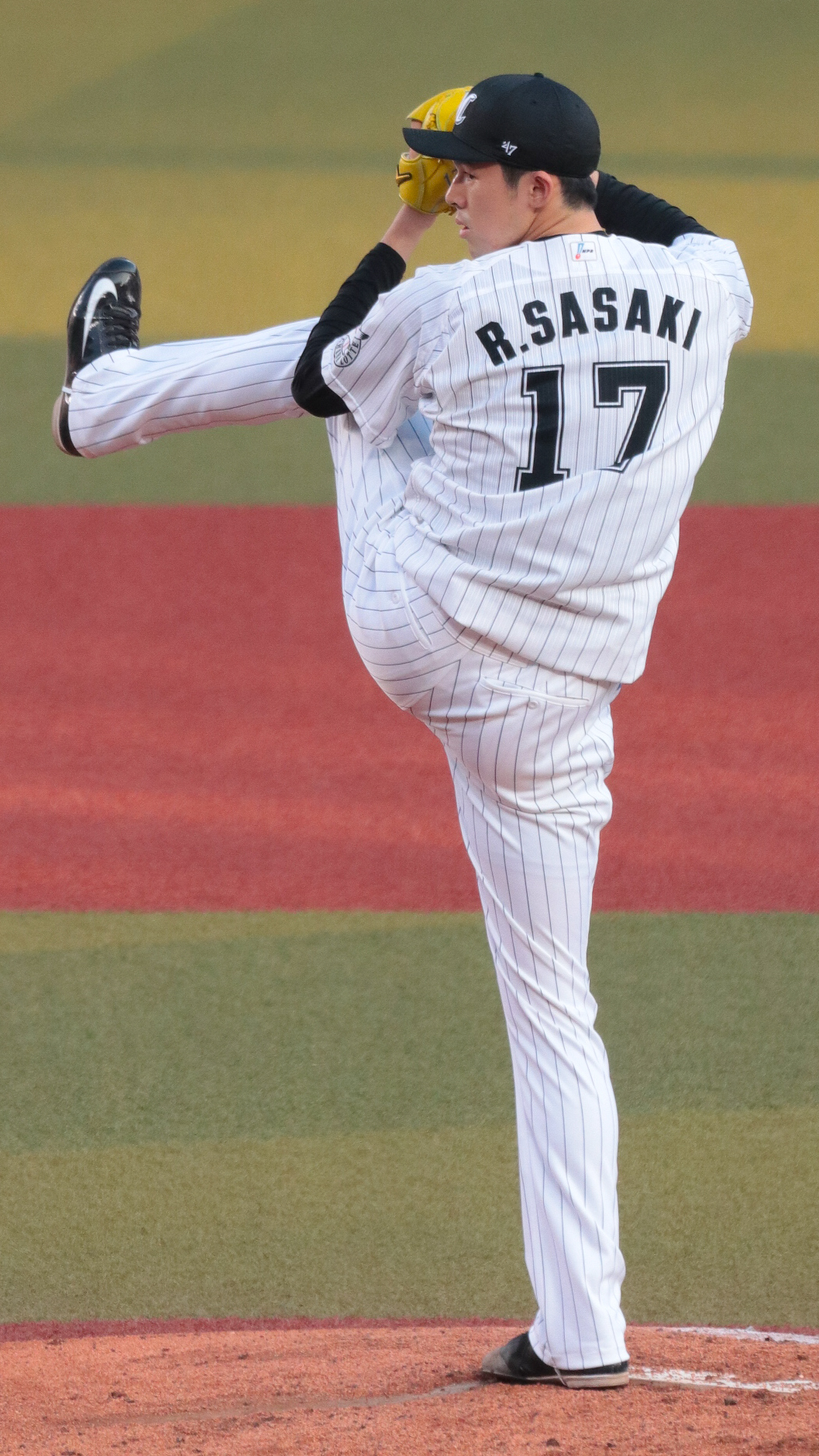
- Roki Sasaki, who was nominated and a bid lottery for by four teams.

General information
- Sport: Baseball
- Date: October 17, 2019
- Location: Grand Prince Hotel Takanawa, Tokyo
- Networks: TBS (first round), sky-A
- Sponsored by: Taisho Pharmaceutical

Overview
- 107 total selections in 16 (Includes draft for developmental players) rounds
- League: Nippon Professional Baseball
- First round selections: Roki Sasaki; Yasunobu Okugawa; Takaya Ishikawa

The 2019 Nippon Professional Baseball (NPB) Draft was held on October 17, 2019, for the 55th time at the Grand Prince Hotel Takanawa to assign amateur baseball players to the NPB. It was arranged with the special cooperation of Taisho Pharmaceutical with official naming rights. The draft was officially called "The Professional Baseball Draft Meeting supported by Lipovitan D ". It has been sponsored by Taisho Pharmaceutical for the seventh consecutive year since 2013.

== Summary ==
Only the first round picks will be done by bid lottery. From 2015 to 2018, the second round of Waiver priority was given to the lowest team in the regular season of the league who the most wins in the Interleague play, but from 2019, the Professional Baseball Executive Committee has decided that the Central League and the Pacific League will be given waiver priority alternately every other year, and in 2019 Central League received the waiver priority. From the third round the order was reversed continuing in the same fashion until all picks were exhausted.

== First Round Contested Picks ==
	Player name	Position	Teams selected by
First Round	**Roki Sasaki**	Pitcher	Fighters, **Marines**, Eagles, Lions
First Round	**Yasunobu Okugawa**	Pitcher	**Swallows**, Tigers, Giants
First Round	**Takaya Ishikawa**	Infielder	Buffaloes, **Dragons**, Hawks
Second Round	**Ryusei Kawano**	Pitcher	Buffaloes, **Fighters**
Second Round	**Tetsu Miyagawa**	Pitcher	Giants, **Lions**

- **Bolded** teams indicate who won the right to negotiate contract following a lottery.
- In the first round, **Masato Morishita** (Pitcher) was selected by the **Carp** and **Keito Mori** (Infielder) by the **Baystars** without a bid lottery.
- In the second round, **Junya Nishi** (Pitcher) was selected by the **Tigers**, **Hiroto Kobukata** (Infielder) by the **Eagles**, and **Naoki Satoh** (Outfielder) by the **Hawks** without a bid lottery.
- In the thrird round, **Hiroya Miyagi** (Pitcher) was selected by the **Buffaloes**, and **Kenshin Hotta** (Pitcher) by the **Giants** without a bid lottery.
- List of selected players.

== Selected Players ==
Key
*	Player did not sign

- The order of the teams is the order of second round waiver priority.
- **Bolded** After that, a developmental player who contracted as a registered player under control.
- List of selected players.

=== Tokyo Yakult Swallows ===
Pick	Player name	Position	Team
#1	Yasunobu Okugawa	Pitcher	Seiryo High School
#2	Daiki Yoshida	Pitcher	Nippon Sport Science University
#3	Koki Sugiyama	Pitcher	Sōka University
#4	Hiroki Ohnishi	Pitcher	Osaka University of Commerce
#5	Hideki Nagaoka	Infielder	Yachiyo Shoin High School
#6	Ryusei Takeoka	Pitcher	Kosei High School

=== Orix Buffaloes ===
Pick	Player name	Position	Team
#1	Hiroya Miyagi	Pitcher	Konan High School
#2	Kotaro Kurebayashi	Infielders	Suruga General High School
#3	Ryota Muranishi	Pitcher	Kindai University
#4	Yuito Mae	Pitcher	Tsuda Gakuen High School
#5	Shoki Katsumata	Infielder	International Budo University
Developmental Player Draft
#1	Kazuma Satoh	Pitcher	Yokohama Hayato High School
#2	Futa Tanioka	Pitcher	Takeda High School
#3	Yuito Nakata	Pitcher	Osaka Tōin High School
#4	Yamato Hirano	Outfielder	Nissho Gakuen High School
#5	Ryoya Tsurumi	Catcher	Tokiwa University High School
#6	**Seiichiro Ohshita**	Outfielder	Hakuoh University
#7	Yugo Satoh	Outfielder	Sendai University
#8	Masayuki Matsuyama	Pitcher	Toyama GRN Thunderbirds

=== Chunichi Dragons ===
Pick	Player name	Position	Team
#1	Takaya Ishikawa	Infielder	Toho High School
#2	Yuki Hashimoto	Pitcher	Osaka University of Commerce
#3	Yuichiro Okano	Pitcher	Toshiba
#4	Yuya Gunji	Catcher	Keio University
#5	Yuki Okabayashi	Pitcher	Komono High School
#6	Ryushin Takeuchi	Pitcher	Sapporo Sosei High School
Developmental Player Draft
#1	Hiroaki Matsuda	Pitcher	Nagoya University

=== Hokkaido Nippon-Ham Fighters ===
Pick	Player name	Position	Team
#1	Ryusei Kawano	Pitcher	JFE Steel Western Japan
#2	Kazuaki Tateno	Pitcher	Tokai Rika
#3	Kyohei Ueno	Infielder	Kyoto International High School
#4	Kenya Suzuki	Pitcher	JX Eneos
#5	Daiki Mochizuki	Pitcher	Sōka University
#6	Yuki Umebayashi	Catcher	Hiroshima Bunka Gakuen University
#7	Shoto Kataoka	Outfielder	Higashi Nippon International University
Developmental Player Draft
#1	**Hakuto Miyata**	Outfielder	Fukuoka University
#2	**Ryunosuke Higuchi**	Infielder	Niigata Albirex BC
#3	**Ryota Hasegawa**	Pitcher	Niigata Albirex BC

=== Hiroshima Toyo Carp ===
Pick	Player name	Position	Team
#1	Masato Morishita	Pitcher	Meiji University
#2	Koki Ugusa	Outfielder	Hosei University
#3	Hiroto Suzuki	Pitcher	Kasumigaura High School
#4	Yuya Nirasawa	Infielder	Hanasaki Tokuharu High School
#5	Tomoki Ishihara	Catcher	Tenri University
#6	Shogo Tamamura	Pitcher	Nyu High School
Developmental Player Draft
#1	**Taiki Mochimaru**	Catcher	Asahikawa University High School
#2	Motohide Kinoshita	Outfielder	Tsuruga Kehi High School
#3	Takamasa Une	Pitcher	Kagawa Olive Guyners

=== Chiba Lotte Marines ===
Pick	Player name	Position	Team
#1	Roki Sasaki	Pitcher	Ofunato High School
#2	Toshiya Satoh	Catcher	Toyo University
#3	Akito Takabe	Outfielder	Kokushikan University
#4	Rikuto Yokoyama	Pitcher	Senshu University Matsudo High School
#5	Koki Fukuda	Infielder	Hosei University
Developmental Player Draft
#1	**Fumiya Motomae**	Pitcher	Hokusho University
#2	**Shota Ueda**	Catcher	Keio University

=== Hanshin Tigers ===
Pick	Player name	Position	Team
#1	Junya Nishi	Pitcher	Soshi Gakuen High School
#2	Kouta Inoue	Outfielder	Riseisha High School
#3	Masaki Oyokawa	Pitcher	Yokohama High School
#4	Jo Endo	Infielder	Tokai University Sagami High School
#5	Kento Fujita	Catcher	Chukyo University Chukyo High School
#6	Ippei Ogawa	Pitcher	Tokai University
Developmental Player Draft
#1	**Dan Onodera**	Outfielder	Osaka University of Commerce
#2	Kouta Okuyama	Outfielder	Shizuoka University

=== Tohoku Rakuten Golden Eagles ===
Pick	Player name	Position	Team
#1	Hiroto Kobukata	Infielder	Osaka Gas
#2	Fumiya Kurokawa	Infielder	Chiben Gakuen Wakayama High School
#3	Taisei Tsurusaki	Pitcher	Keio University
#4	Atsuki Mutoh	Outfielder	Miyakonojo Higashi High School
#5	Yoma Fukumori	Pitcher	Kyushu Sangyo University
#6	Ryota Takinaka	Pitcher	Honda Suzuka
#7	Kei Mizugami	Catcher	Akashi Commercial High School
Developmental Player Draft
#1	Yuto Egawa	Catcher	Oita High School
#2	**Shinri Komine**	Pitcher	Kagoshima Josei High School
#3	Maaki Yamazaki	Infielder	University of Hawaiʻi
#4	Kiyoharu Sawano	Infielder	Homare High School

=== Yokohama DeNA Baystars ===
Pick	Player name	Position	Team
#1	Keito Mori	Infielder	Toin Gakuen High School
#2	Yuya Sakamoto	Pitcher	Ritsumeikan University
#3	Hiromu Ise	Pitcher	Meiji University
#4	Junpei Azuma	Catcher	Chiben Gakuen Wakayama High School
#5	Hayato Tanabe	Infielder	Kaisei High School
#6	Tatsuo Ebina	Infielder	Aomori University
#7	Sota Asada	Pitcher	Ariake High School

=== Fukuoka Softbank Hawks ===
Pick	Player name	Position	Team
#1	Naoki Satoh	Outfielder	JR West
#2	Takashi Umino	Catcher	Tokai University
#3	Yuki Tsumori	Pitcher	Tohoku Fukushi University
#4	Jui Kobayashi	Infielder	Tokai University Sapporo High School
#5	Tatsuru Yanagimachi	Outfielder	Keio University
Developmental Player Draft
#1	**Soichiro Ishizuka**	Catcher	Kurosawajiri Technical High School
#2	**Tomohisa Ohzeki**	Pitcher	Sendai University
#3	Daisuke Itoh	Infielder	Hachinohe Gakuin Kosei High School
#4	Haruki Katsuren	Infielder	Konan High School
#5	Hidetora Funakoshi	Outfielder	Johoku High School
#6	Shota Araki	Infielder	Chiharadai High School
#7	Shun Murakami	Pitcher	Yamagata Chuo High School

=== Yomiuri Giants ===
Pick	Player name	Position	Team
#1	Kenshin Hotta	Pitcher	Aomori Yamada High School
#2	Ryu Ohta	Pitcher	JR East
#3	Hirokazu Kikuta	Outfielder	Joso Gakuin High School
#4	Haruto Inoue	Pitcher	Maebashi Commercial High School
#5	Shinnosuke Yamase	Catcher	Seiryo High School
#6	Kaito Itoh	Outfielder	Sakata Minami High School
Developmental Player Draft
#1	**Hayato Hirama**	Infielder	Tokushima Indigo Socks
#2	Sota Katoh	Outfielder	Saitama Musashi Heat Bears

=== Saitama Seibu Lions ===
Pick	Player name	Position	Team
#1	Tetsu Miyagawa	Pitcher	Toshiba
#2	Shota Hamaya	Pitcher	Mitsubishi Hitachi Power Systems
#3	Kouki Matsuoka	Pitcher	Saitama Musashi Heat Bears
#4	Ryota Kawano	Infielder	Kyushu Gakuin High School
#5	Sena Tsuge	Catcher	Honda Suzuka
#6	Hiroki Inoue	Pitcher	Nihon University Daisan High School
#7	Towa Uema	Pitcher	Tokushima Indigo Socks
#8	Junichiro Kishi	Outfielder	Tokushima Indigo Socks
Developmental Player Draft
#1	Toshihiro Idei	Pitcher	Kanagawa University

Preceded by 2018	Nippon Professional Baseball draft	Succeeded by 2020
