= Kouta Inoue =

Japanese baseball player (born 2001)

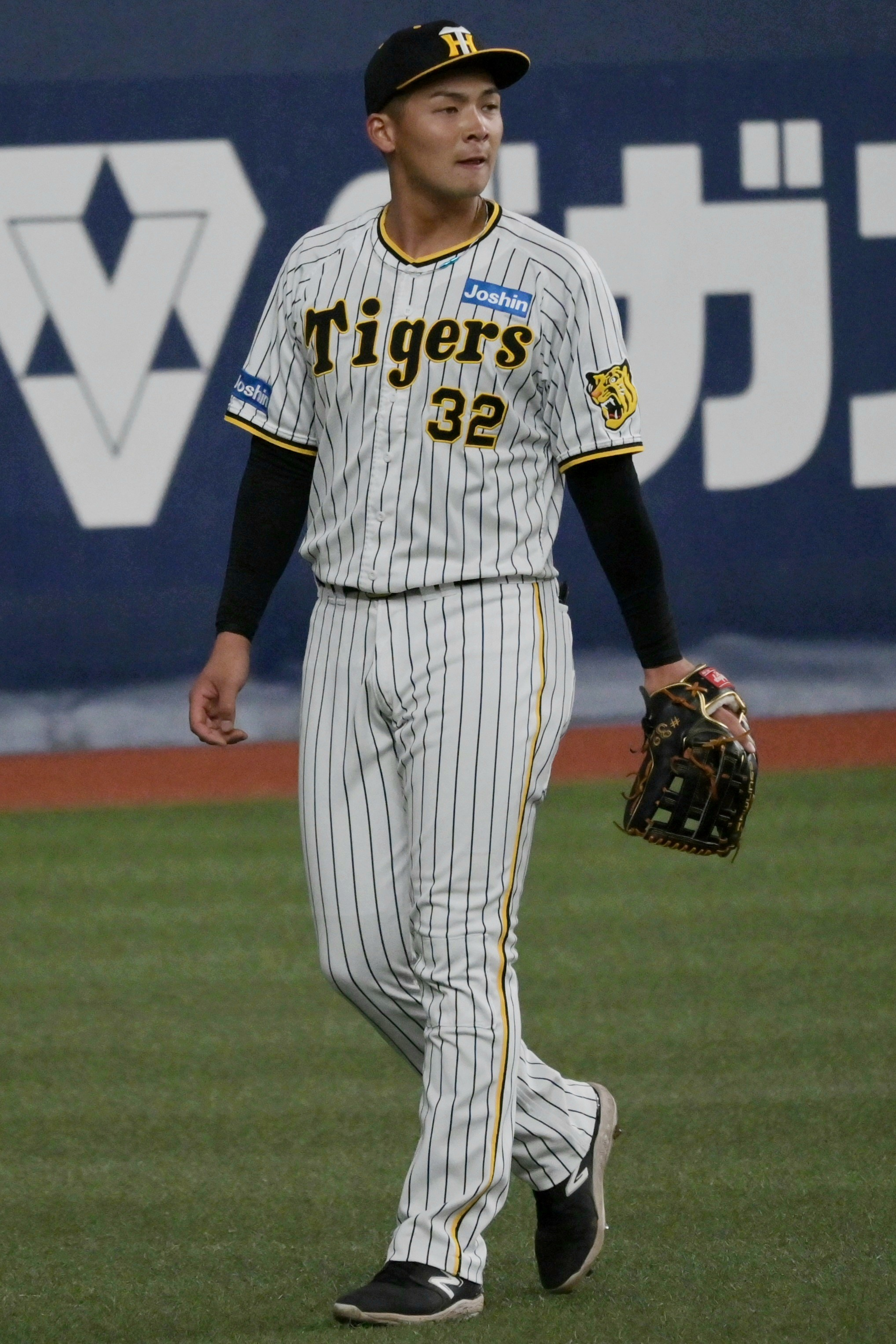
- Inoue in 2023

Chiba Lotte Marines – No. 39
- Outfielder
- Born: August 12, 2001 (age 24); Daito, Osaka, Japan
- Bats: Right Throws: Right

NPB debut
- October 14, 2020, for the Hanshin Tigers

NPB statistics (through 2025 season)
- Batting average: .189
- Hits: 20
- Home runs: 3
- RBI: 16
- Stolen bases: 2

Teams
- Hanshin Tigers (2020–2025); Chiba Lotte Marines (2026–present)

Kouta Inoue (井上 広大, Inoue, Kouta; born August 12, 2001) is a Japanese professional baseball outfielder for the Chiba Lotte Marines of Nippon Professional Baseball (NPB).

== Amateur career ==
Inoue joined the "ANT Blue Jays" and started playing softball in the second grade at Nango Elementary School in Daito City. During his time at Nango Junior High School in Daito City, he switched to baseball and played for "Higashi-Osaka Senior." He primarily served as a catcher.

After advancing to Riseisha High School, he joined the team as an outfielder and was included on the bench from the summer of his first year. As the "No. 6 right fielder," he started in the semifinals of the North Osaka Tournament during the summer of his second year. Although the team led by one run going into the ninth inning against Osaka Toin, which featured players like Akira Neo and Kyota Fujiwara, they suffered a reversal and missed their chance to compete in the Koshien Tournament.

From the fall of his second year, as part of the new team, he became the cleanup hitter. The team participated in the spring invitational tournament during his third year. However, in the first-round game against Seiryo, he was shut down by Yasunobu Okugawa, going hitless in four at-bats with two strikeouts. The team was also completely dominated, striking out 17 times in total and losing in a shutout.

After experiencing struggles, including being moved to the lower part of the batting order, he regained his position as the cleanup hitter in the summer of his third year. In the Osaka Tournament, he batted .407 with four home runs in seven games, leading his team to its first-ever consecutive appearances in the spring and summer Koshien tournaments. At Koshien, he recorded a batting average of .385 with 10 hits in 26 at-bats, three home runs, and 14 RBIs. In the championship game against Seiryo, he hit a three-run homer off Okugawa, avenging their loss in the spring and contributing to Riseisha's first Koshien championship. He hit a total of 49 home runs in high school. Notably, Hisanori Yasuda was two years ahead of him, and Daichi Kobukata was one year below him at the school.

== Professional career ==
=== Hanshin Tigers ===
On October 17, 2019, at the NPB Draft, he was selected in the second round by the Hanshin Tigers. On November 5, he signed a provisional contract with a signing bonus of 60 million yen and an annual salary of 7.2 million yen (both estimated). His uniform number was set as 32. The scout in charge was Ryo Watanabe. On November 19, while returning home from school, he twisted his right ankle after being bumped from behind on a staircase at a train station, resulting in a sprain.

In 2020, he participated in the second team's spring training camp in Aki City, Kochi Prefecture. During practice games in the camp, he consistently played as the cleanup hitter under team policy, making a strong impression. After the start of the Western League, he continued as the cleanup hitter and competed for the top spots in home runs and RBIs. Following this performance, he was promoted to the first team for the first time in his professional career on October 15. That same day, he made his first-team debut as the starting right fielder, batting seventh, in a game against the Chunichi Dragons at Nagoya Dome. It was the first time in 52 years since Kozo Kawato in 1968 that a high school graduate rookie position player started in their first-team debut for the Hanshin Tigers.

In his third game on October 16, during a match against the Tokyo Yakult Swallows at Koshien Stadium, he recorded his first professional hit and RBI with a pinch-hit RBI double to center in the bottom of the 8th inning. This marked the first hit by a Hanshin high school graduate rookie since Osamu Hamanaka in 1997, and the first RBI since Masayuki Kakefu in 1974. He subsequently appeared in three more games as a pinch hitter (going 0-for-3) before being removed from the roster on October 21. Returning to the second team, he resumed his role as cleanup hitter and hit his ninth home run on October 29, tying the Hanshin record for most home runs by a high school graduate rookie, set by Kodai Sakurai in 2002. In the second team, he played 69 games, batting .226 with 9 home runs and 36 RBIs, earning the league's Outstanding Player, Rookie of the Year, and Effort Awards.

In 2021, he was selected for the first team's spring training camp in Ginoza Village, Okinawa, along with fellow rookie Junya Nishi. He won the Western League RBI title with 50 RBIs and hit nine home runs. However, on August 20, during a second-team game against SoftBank, he fractured his right tibia while running the bases, ending his season with limited activity. His second-team stats were a .267 batting average with 9 home runs and 50 RBIs in 68 games.

In 2022, he won the Western League title for most hits (96). In the second team, he played 110 games, recording a .222 batting average with 11 home runs and 70 RBIs.

In 2023, he was registered with the first team on April 18. He started three consecutive games from April 19 as the right fielder, batting sixth. On April 20, during a game against Hiroshima, he hit his first timely hit in 916 days. On April 27, in a game against the Giants, he achieved his first three-hit game, recording 3 hits and 4 RBIs.

In 2024, he started the season in the second team, batting .344 with 4 home runs before being promoted to the first team on May 10. In that day's game against the Yokohama DeNA BayStars at Yokohama Stadium, he started as the left fielder, batting fifth, and delivered an RBI single in the sixth inning to extend the lead. The next day, he added another RBI single, rewarding the team's trust in him. On May 12, he was used as the leadoff hitter for the first time and recorded a hit in his second at-bat, contributing a decisive hit in a 1–0 shutout win. However, he struggled to maintain his form, batting .208, and was removed from the roster on May 27.

He was re-registered on August 25, and on August 28, in a game against DeNA at Yokohama Stadium, he hit his first professional home run, a game-tying homer in the sixth inning off Katsuki Azuma. On September 4, in a game against Chunichi at Koshien Stadium, he hit a two-run home run off Shinnosuke Ogasawara, marking his first home run at Koshien. That season, he batted .308 in the Western League, becoming the only player to hit .300 in the league that year and winning the batting title, achieving the rare feat of a batting triple crown in the second team.

=== Chiba Lotte Marines ===
Inoue joined the Chiba Lotte Marines in December 2025.
