= Yuki Hashimoto =

Yuki Hashimoto or Yūki Hashimoto may refer to:

- Yūki Hashimoto (baseball) (橋本 侑樹; born 1998), Japanese baseball player
- Yuki Hashimoto (footballer) (橋本裕貴; born 1994), Japanese footballer
- Yuki Hashimoto (judoka) (橋本 優貴; born 1989), Japanese judoka
- Yuki Hashimoto (politician) (橋本ゆき; born 1992), Japanese politician and musician
