= Okano =

Okano may refer to:

- Okano (surname), a Japanese surname
- Okano Department, a department of Woleu-Ntem Province, Gabon
- Okano River, a river of Gabon
- Okano (album), a 2000 album by Zdravko Čolić
- Oka-no, an alternate name for the former settlement Honsading, California, United States
