= Masaki Oyokawa =

Japanese baseball player (born 2001)

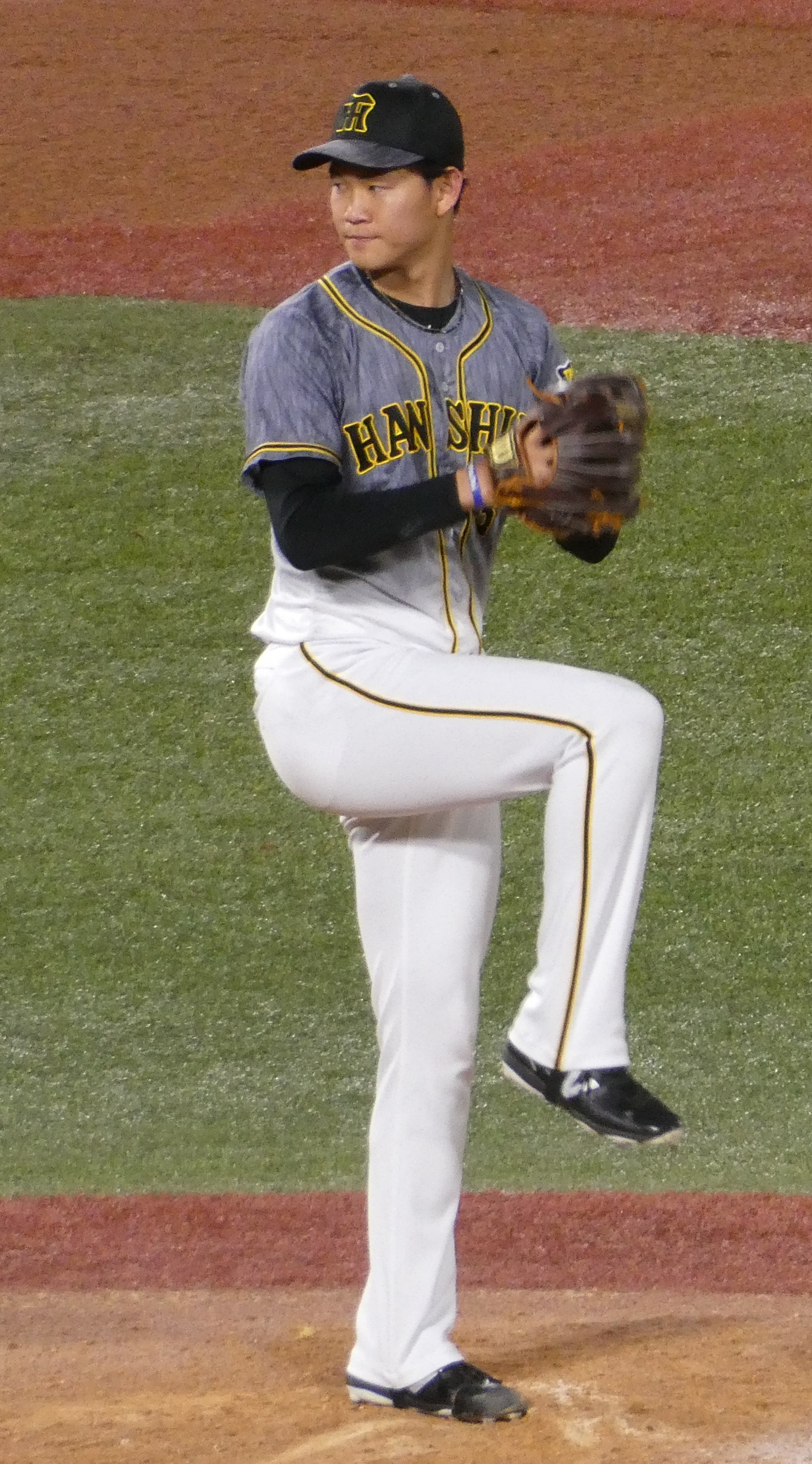
- Oyokawa with the Hanshin Tigers

Hanshin Tigers – No. 37
- Pitcher
- Born: April 18, 2001 (age 24); Sōsa, Chiba, Japan
- Bats: Left Throws: Left

NPB debut
- May 28, 2021, for the Hanshin Tigers

NPB statistics (through 2025 season)
- Win–loss record: 12–10
- Earned run average: 2.20
- Strikeouts: 167
- Stats at Baseball Reference

Teams
- Hanshin Tigers (2021–present)

Career highlights and awards
- NPB All-Star (2025)

Masaki Oyokawa (及川 雅貴, Oyokawa, Masaki; born April 18, 2001 in Sōsa, Chiba) is a Japanese professional baseball pitcher for the Hanshin Tigers of Nippon Professional Baseball (NPB).

He is nicknamed "Oyoyo" by his teammates.

== Early baseball career ==
He started playing little league baseball in 3rd grade for Suka Elementary, and was chosen to play for the Chiba Lotte Marines Junior team in his 6th year. He continued playing baseball for Yokaichiba Daini Junior High, and was selected to pitch for the national team in the 2016 WBSC U-15 Baseball World Cup. He helped Japan finish 2nd overall, and he earned the lowest ERA pitcher award as well as a "Super Junior High pitcher" reputation for his 140 km/h fastball.

He entered Yokohama High School, a known baseball powerhouse in Kanagawa prefecture, and became the team's ace in his 2nd year. But despite his team making it to national tournaments for 3 years in a row, he failed to pitch well in several games that at one point he was stripped of the ace jersey (#1). In his final year, his team almost made it to the summer prefectural finals but lost to the opponent when he gave up 3 runs in less than 2 innings of relief. This was the first time his school was defeated by a public high school in the prefectural tournaments, last occurred in 1997 when Daisuke Matsuzaka was a sophomore pitcher there. Nevertheless, his 153 km/h (95 mph) fastball was enough to gain scout attention and he was one of the top high school prospects of the 2019 draft, along with Junya Nishi, Rōki Sasaki and Yasunobu Okugawa.

== Hanshin Tigers ==
He was the Tiger's 3rd round pick during the 2019 NPB draft. He signed a 50 million yen contract with Hanshin, for an estimated annual salary of 6 million yen. He was assigned jersey number 37.

2020 He spent his first year playing in Western League games (farms). He finished with a 2-4 record in 9 outings with a 6.0 ERA.

2021 He debuted as a middle reliever in the May 25 game against the Lions and pitched a scoreless 2/3 innings. Two days later, he earned his first career win as a reliever after pitching 2 scoreless innings.
