= Takaya Ishikawa =

Japanese baseball player (born 2001)

Takaya Ishikawa 石川昂弥
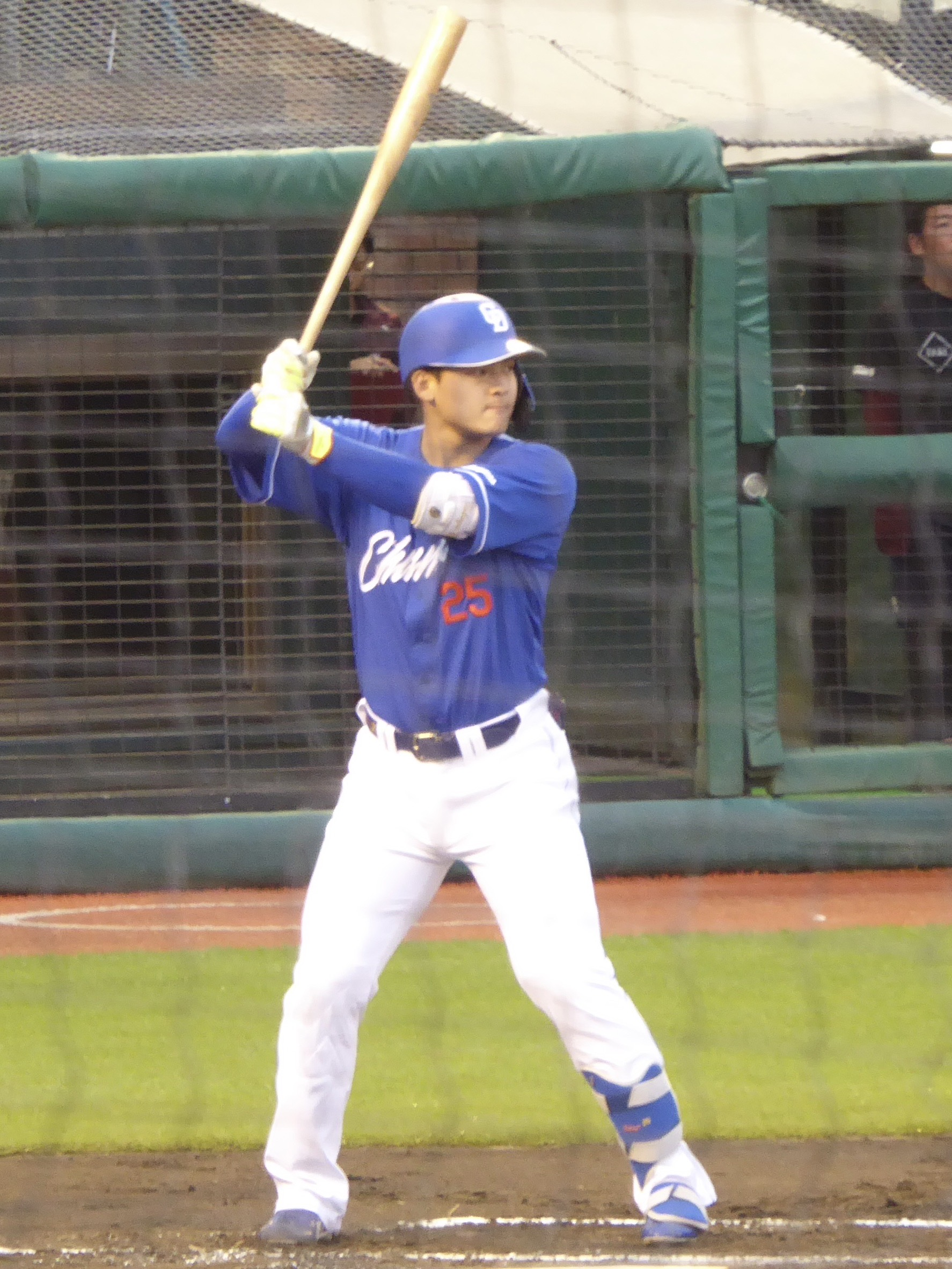

Chunichi Dragons – No. 25
- Infielder
- Born: June 22, 2001 (age 25); Handa, Aichi, Japan
- Bats: Right Throws: Right

NPB debut
- July 22, 2020, for the Chunichi Dragons

NPB statistics (through July 26, 2026)
- Batting average: .243
- Home runs: 30
- Runs batted in: 124
- Stats at Baseball Reference

Teams
- Chunichi Dragons (2020–present)

Takaya Ishikawa (石川昂弥, Ishikawa Takaya; born June 22, 2001) is a professional Japanese baseball player. He plays infielder for the Chunichi Dragons.

Ishikawa won the 2019 Japanese High School Baseball Invitational Tournament with Toho High School where he was the team's ace and batted 4th in the line-up. In the 2019 NPB Draft, he was largely regarded as the most talented hitter of his class.

== Early career ==
Ishikawa reached national attention after helping Toho High School to victory in the 2019 spring invitational tournament where he was the team's ace and clean-up hitter.

On 16 October 2019, Ishikawa was the contested 1st draft pick for the Chunichi Dragons, Orix Buffaloes, and Fukuoka SoftBank Hawks at the 2019 NPB Draft. Rights to negotiate for Ishikawa's contract were won by the Dragons after manager Tsuyoshi Yoda pulled out the winning ticket.

On 1 November, Ishikawa signed a pre-contract with the Dragons guaranteeing a ¥100,000,000 sign-on bonus and a ¥15,000,000 yearly salary with ¥50,000,000 in incentives.
