= Naoki Satoh (baseball) =

Japanese baseball player (born 1998)

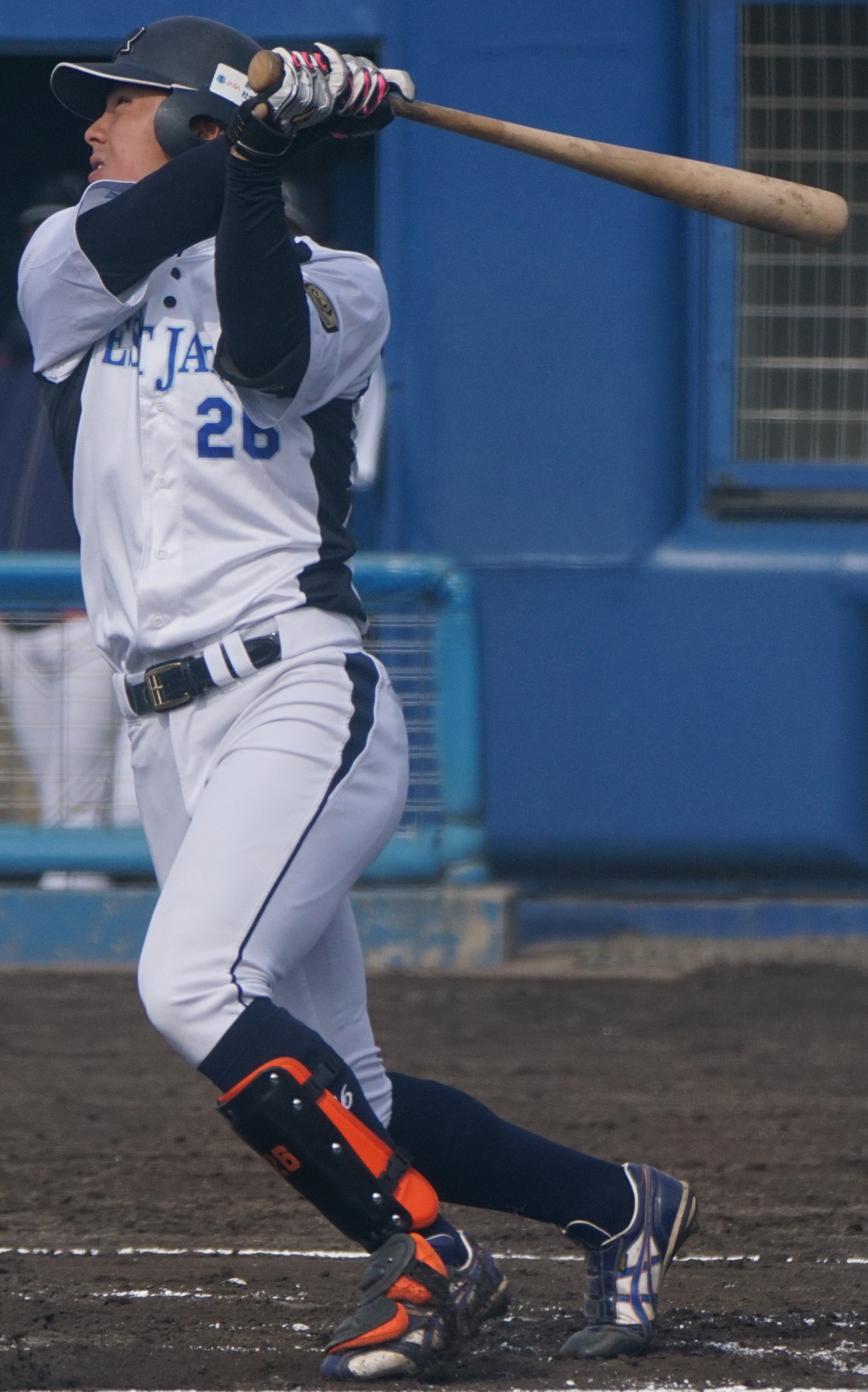
- Satoh with the JR West baseball club.

Tohoku Rakuten Golden Eagles – No. 38
- Outfielder
- Born: September 3, 1998 (age 27); Kobe, Hyogo, Japan
- Bats: Right Throws: Right

NPB debut
- April 29, 2021, for the Fukuoka SoftBank Hawks

NPB statistics (through 2025 season)
- Batting average: .205
- Home runs: 7
- Run batted in: 28
- Stats at Baseball Reference

Teams
- Fukuoka SoftBank Hawks (2020–2025); Tohoku Rakuten Golden Eagles (2026–present)

Career highlights and awards
- Japan Series champion (2025); Western League Stolen bases leader (2020)

Naoki Satoh (佐藤 直樹, Satō Naoki; born September 3, 1998) is a Japanese professional baseball outfielder for the Tohoku Rakuten Golden Eagles of Nippon Professional Baseball (NPB).

== Professional career ==
On October 17, 2019, Satoh was drafted by the Fukuoka Softbank Hawks first overall pick in the 2019 Nippon Professional Baseball draft.

In 2020 season, Satoh played in the Western League of NPB's minor leagues. On December 17, 2020, he was honored for the Western League Stolen base Leader Award at the NPB AWARDS 2020.

On April 29, 2021, Satoh debuted in the Pacific League against the Hokkaido Nippon-Ham Fighters. On May 15, he recorded his first stolen base against the Chiba Lotte Marines. He was named to the starting lineup for the first time against the Tohoku Rakuten Golden Eagles on June 26. In 2021 season, he made 25 appearances in the Pacific League.

April 21, 2022, Satoh got his first hit against the Orix Buffaloes. And on August 20 against the Hokkaido Nippon-Ham Fighters, he recorded his first home run. In 2022 season, he finished the season with a .125 batting average, one home run, and two RBI in 48 games.

In 2023 season, Satoh finished the regular season with a .167 batting average, a one home run, a 3 stolen bases and 2 RBIs in the 41 games. On November 28, 2023, the Hawks re-signed him as a developmental player with an estimated salary of 13 million yen.
