= Ryūshin Takeuchi =

Japanese baseball player

Ryūshin Takeuchi 竹内龍臣
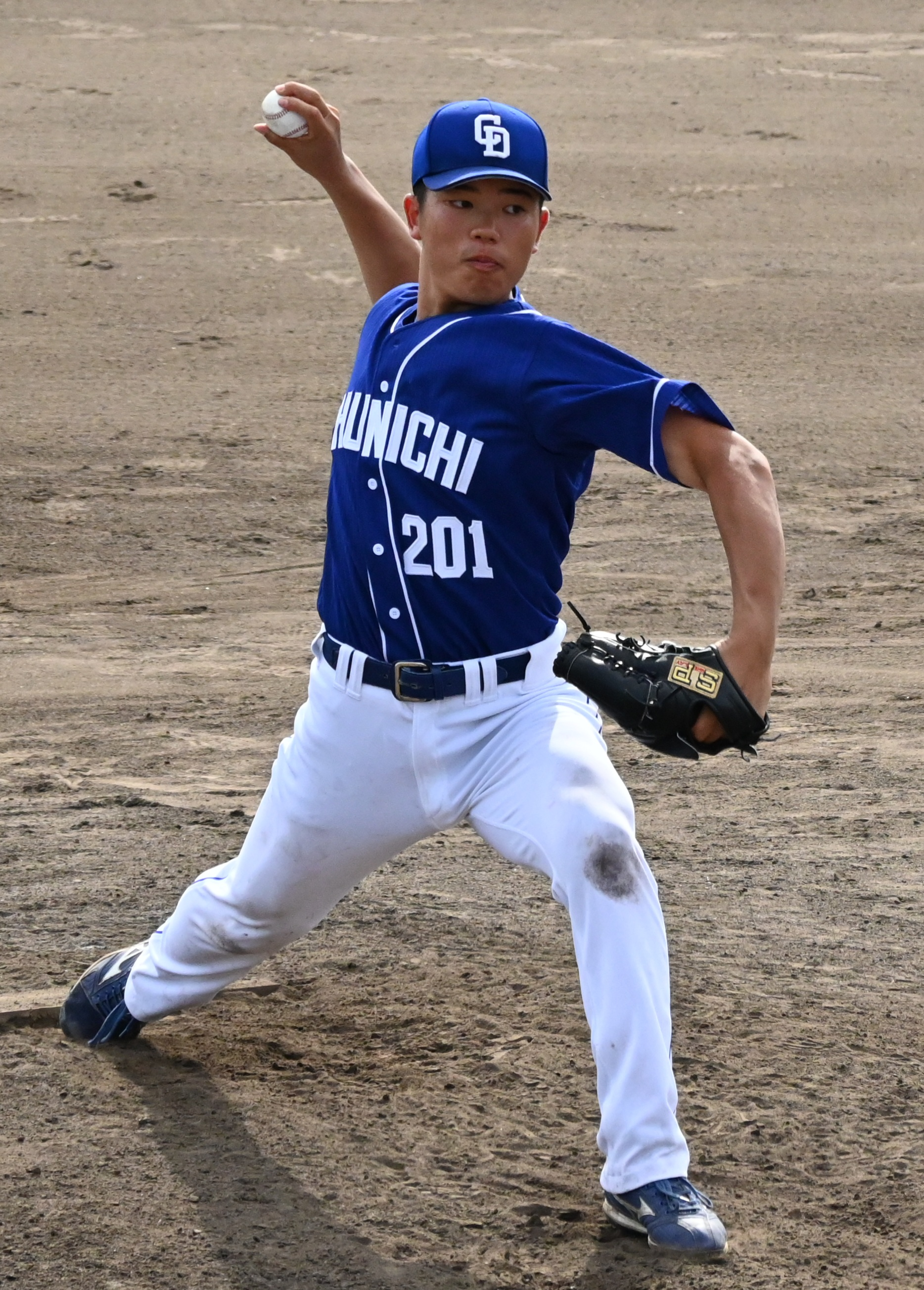
- Pitcher
- Born: December 11, 2001 (age 24); Sapporo, Hokkaido, Japan
- Bats: Left Throws: Right
- Stats at Baseball Reference

Teams
- Chunichi Dragons (2020–2024)

Ryūshin Takeuchi (竹内龍臣, Takeuchi Ryūshin; born December 11, 2001 in Sapporo, Hokkaido, Japan) is a Japanese professional baseball pitcher for the Chunichi Dragons of Nippon Professional Baseball (NPB).

== Career ==
On October 17, 2019, Takeuchi was selected as the 6th draft pick for the Chunichi Dragons at the 2019 NPB draft and on 5 November signed a provisional contract with a ¥25,000,000 sign-on bonus and a ¥5,500,000 yearly salary.

On November 26, 2020, Takeuchi re-signed with Dragons. On 8 October 2024, it was announced he had been released by the team.
