= Umino =

Umino is a surname. Notable people with the surname include:

- Chica Umino, Japanese manga artist
- Shota Umino (born 1997), Japanese professional wrestler
- Takashi Umino (born 1997), Japanese baseball player
- Tsukina Umino (海乃月雫), Japanese professional wrestler
