= Ippei Ogawa =

Japanese baseball player (born 2000)

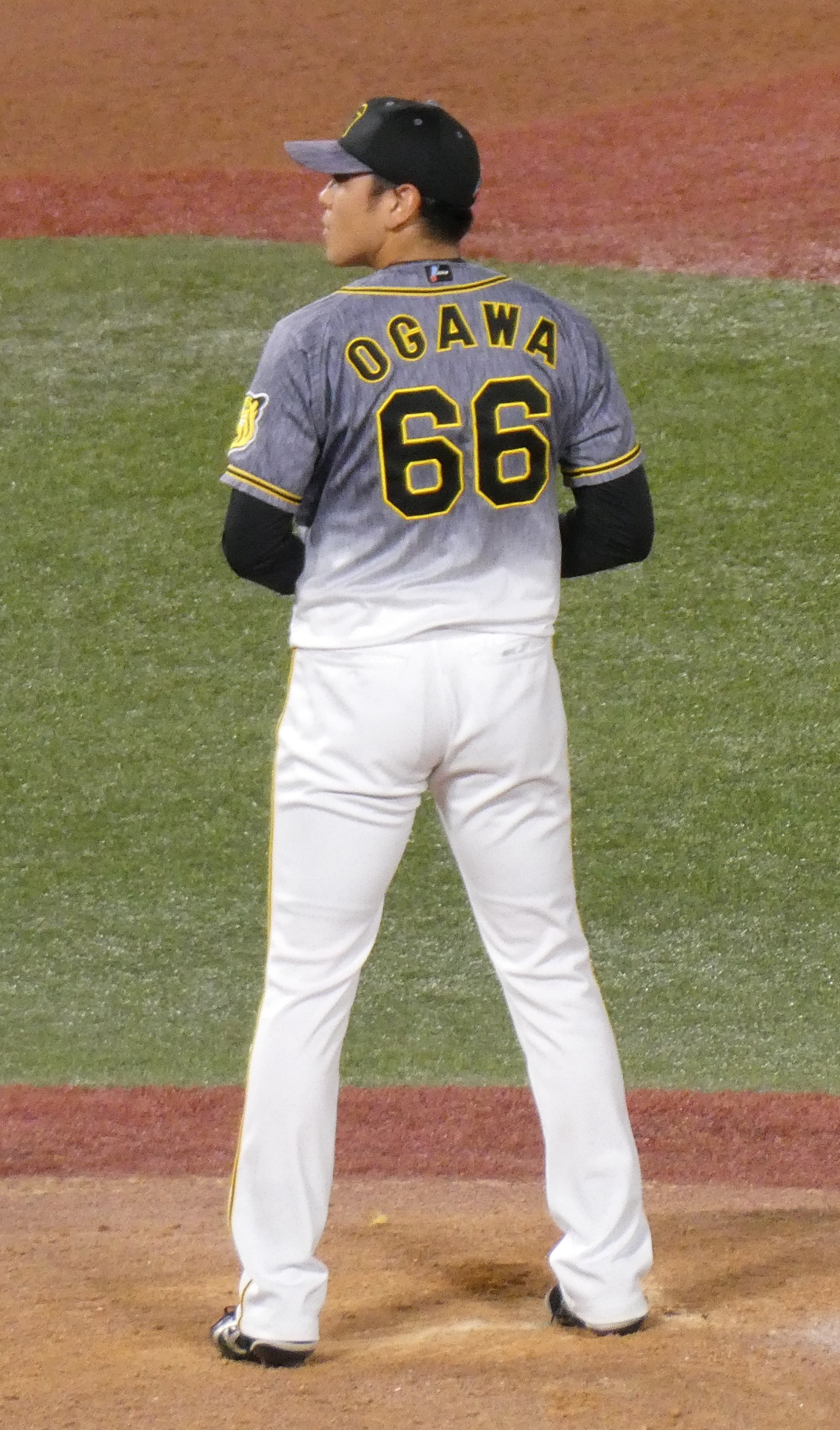

Hanshin Tigers – No. 122
- Pitcher
- Born: June 3, 1997 (age 28); Zushi, Kanagawa, Japan
- Bats: Right Throws: Right

NPB debut
- June 20, 2020, for the Yomiuri Giants

Career statistics (through 2023)
- Win–loss record: 1–2
- Earned run average: 4.03
- Strikeouts: 59

Teams
- Hanshin Tigers (2020–present)

Ippei Ogawa (小川一平, Ogawa Ippei; born July 22, 2000) is a professional Japanese baseball player. He is a pitcher for the Hanshin Tigers of Nippon Professional Baseball (NPB).
