= Hiyu Motoyama =

Japanese baseball player (born 1998)

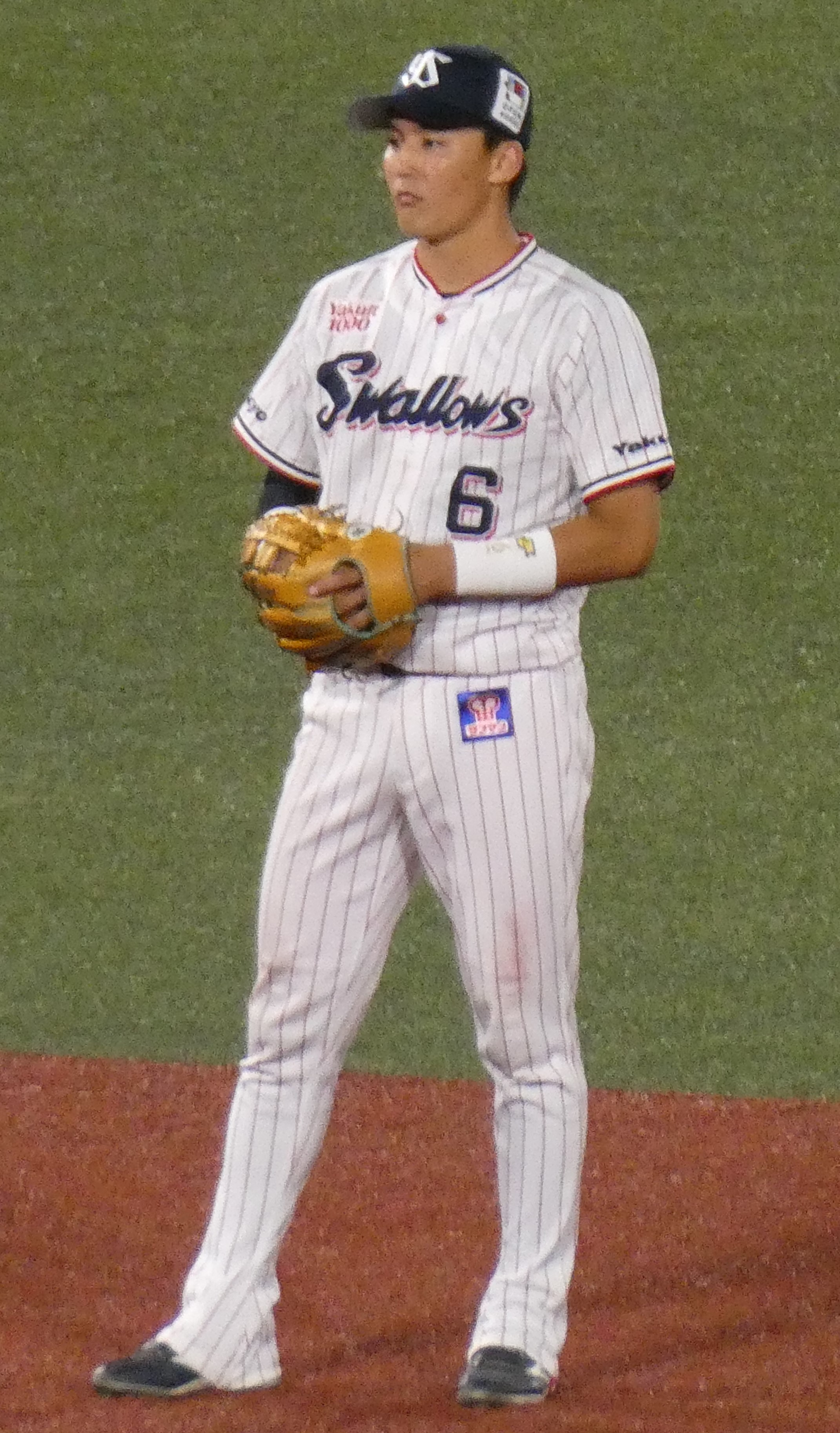
- Motoyama with the Tokyo Yakult Swallows

Hanshin Tigers – No. 00
- Infielder
- Born: December 4, 1998 (age 27); Higashiōsaka, Osaka, Japan
- Bats: Left Throws: Right

NPB debut
- March 27, 2021, for the Tokyo Yakult Swallows

Career statistics (through 2025 season)
- Batting average: .202
- Home runs: 5
- RBIs: 34
- Stats at Baseball Reference

Teams
- Tokyo Yakult Swallows (2021–2023); Saitama Seibu Lions (2024–2025); Hanshin Tigers (2026–present)

Career highlights and awards
- 1× Japan Series champion (2021)

Hiyu Motoyama (元山 飛優, Motoyama Hiyu; born December 4, 1998) is a Japanese professional baseball infielder for the Hanshin Tigers of Nippon Professional Baseball (NPB). He has previously played in NPB for the Tokyo Yakult Swallows.

== Career ==
=== Tokyo Yakult Swallows ===
On March 27, 2021, Motoyama made his Nippon Professional Baseball (NPB) debut for the Tokyo Yakult Swallows.

=== Saitama Seibu Lions ===
On December 21, 2023, Motoyama was traded to the Saitama Seibu Lions in exchange for Tetsu Miyagawa.
