= Ryota Muranishi =

Japanese baseball player (born 1997)

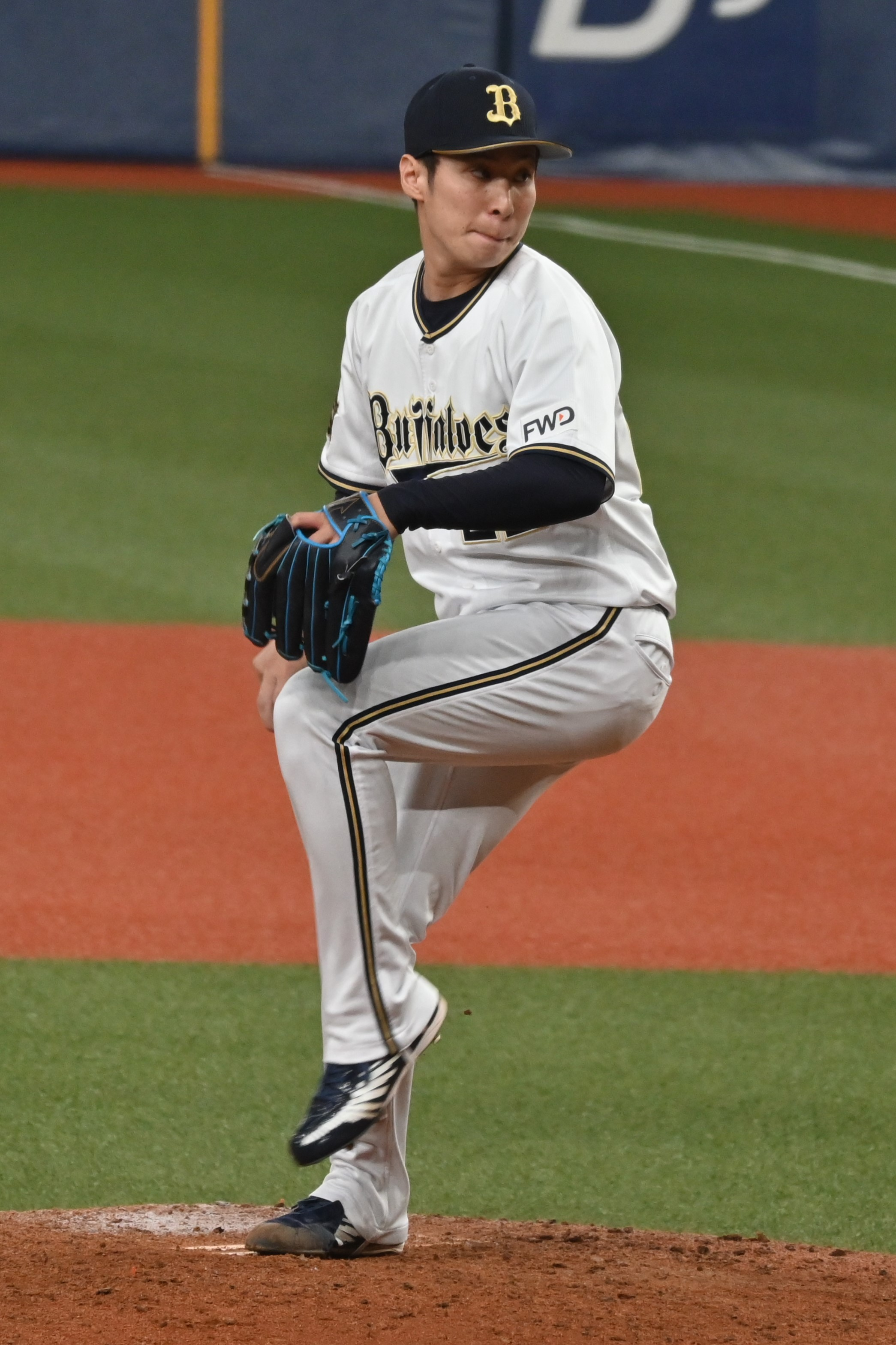

Orix Buffaloes – No. 122
- Pitcher
- Born: June 6, 1997 (age 28); Awaji, Hyōgo, Japan
- Bats: Left Throws: Right

NPB debut
- June 25, 2020, for the Orix Buffaloes

Career statistics (through April 6, 2022)
- Win–loss record: 1–2
- Earned run average: 5.79
- Strikeouts: 13

Teams
- Orix Buffaloes (2020–present)

Ryota Muranishi (村西 良太, Muranishi Ryota; born June 6, 1997, in Awaji, Hyōgo, Japan) is a professional Japanese baseball player. He is a pitcher for the Orix Buffaloes of Nippon Professional Baseball (NPB).
