= Tetsu Miyagawa =

Japanese baseball player (born 1995)

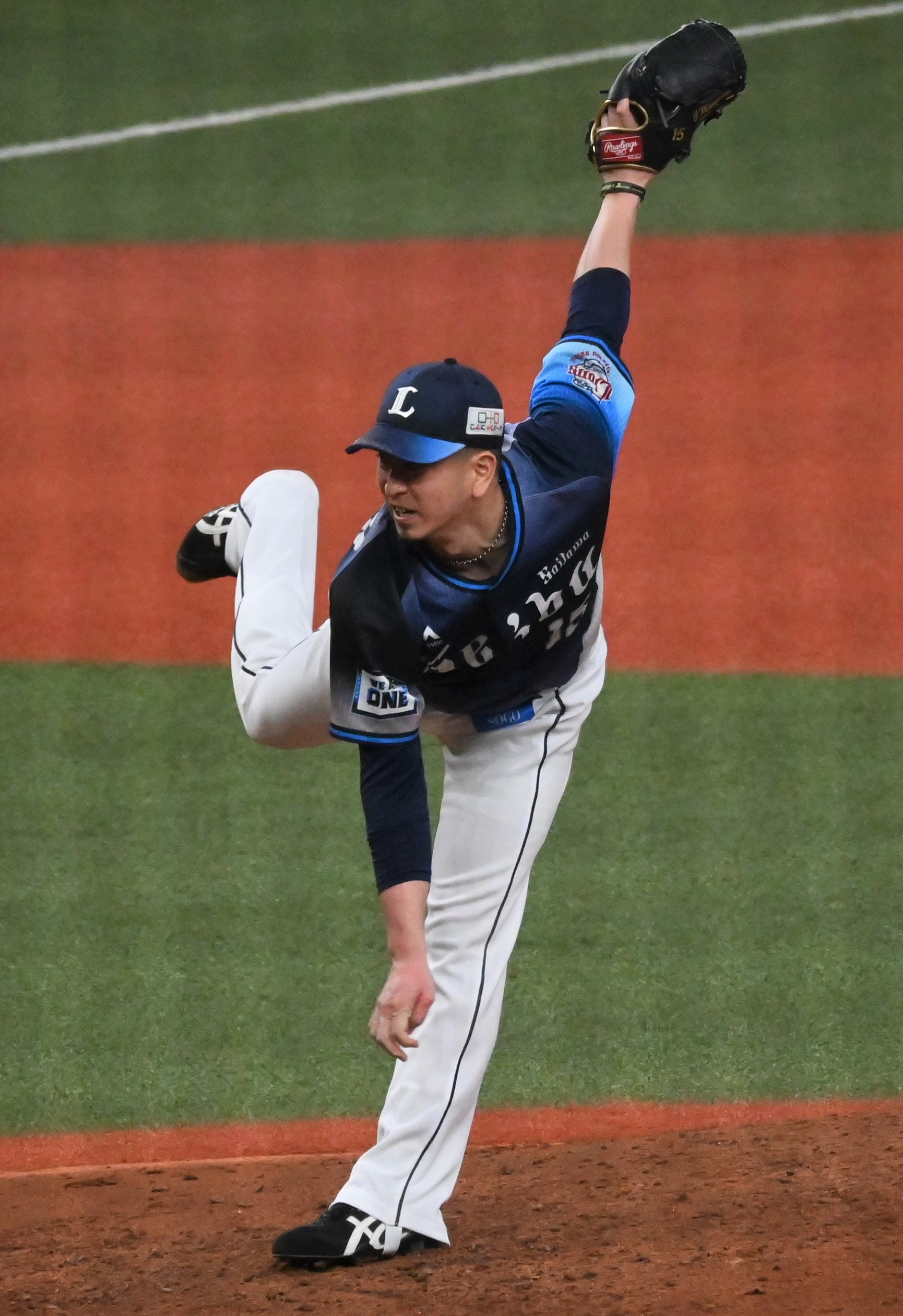
- Miyagawa in 2022
- Pitcher
- Born: October 10, 1995 (age 31); Ikoma, Nara, Japan
- Batted: Right Threw: Right

NPB debut
- June 20, 2020, for the Saitama Seibu Lions

Last 2024 appearance
- April 14, 2024, for the Tokyo Yakult Swallows

Career statistics
- Win–loss record: 5–5
- Earned Run Average: 4.36
- Strikeouts: 132
- Saves: 1
- Holds: 20
- Stats at Baseball Reference

Teams
- Saitama Seibu Lions (2020–2023); Tokyo Yakult Swallows (2024–2025)

Tetsu Miyagawa (宮川 哲, Miyagawa Tetsu; born October 10, 1995) is a Japanese professional baseball pitcher for the Tokyo Yakult Swallows of Nippon Professional Baseball (NPB). He has previously played in NPB for the Saitama Seibu Lions.

== Career ==
=== Saitama Seibu Lions ===
On June 20, 2020, Miyagawa made his Nippon Professional Baseball (NPB) debut for the Saitama Seibu Lions.

=== Tokyo Yakult Swallows ===
On December 21, 2023, Miyagawa was traded to the Tokyo Yakult Swallows in exchange for Hiyu Motoyama.
