= Takashi Umino =

Japanese baseball player (born 1997)

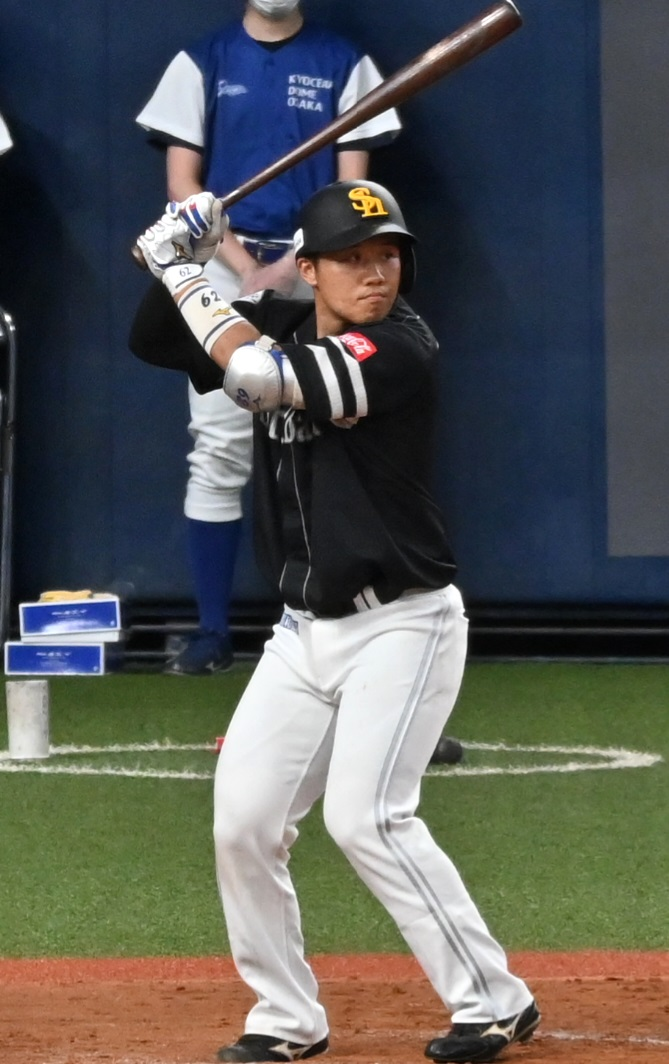
- Umino with the Fukuoka SoftBank Hawks

Fukuoka SoftBank Hawks – No. 62
- Catcher
- Born: July 15, 1997 (age 29); Okayama, Okayama, Japan
- Bats: Right Throws: Right

NPB debut
- September 18, 2020, for the Fukuoka SoftBank Hawks

NPB statistics (through 2024 season)
- Batting average: .168
- Home runs: 3
- Runs batted in: 16

Teams
- Fukuoka SoftBank Hawks (2020–present)

Career highlights and awards
- 3x Japan Series champion (2020, 2025, 2026)
Medals
Men's baseball
Representing Japan
Haarlem Baseball Week
Gold medal – first place	2018 Haarlem, Netherlands	Team

Takashi Umino (海野 隆司, Umino Takashi; born July 15, 1997) is a Japanese professional baseball catcher for the Fukuoka SoftBank Hawks of Nippon Professional Baseball (NPB).

== Early baseball career ==
Umino participated in the 2nd grade summer the 96th Japanese High School Baseball Championship as a Catcher of the Kanzei High School with Yūya Ogō.

Umino went on to Tokai University and won the Batting Leader Award in the Tokyo Metropolitan Area University Baseball League in the spring of his 3rd grade.

== Professional career ==
On October 17, 2019, Umino was drafted by the Fukuoka SoftBank Hawks in the 2019 Nippon Professional Baseball draft.

On September 18, 2020, Umino debuted in the Pacific League against the Tohoku Rakuten Golden Eagles. And in the match against the Saitama Seibu Lions on November 1, he participated as a starter. In 2020 season, he played in 5 games in the Pacific League. In the 2020 Japan Series against the Yomiuri Giants, he was selected as the Japan Series roster, and participated as a bench player.

October 25, 2021, Umino recorded his first hit in the final game of the season against the Chiba Lotte Marines. He also played 11 games in the Pacific League during the 2021 season.

In 2022 season, He finished the regular season with a .167 batting average, one home run, and four runs batted in in 47 games as a reserve catcher. On August 26, 2022, Umino recorded his first home run against the Hokkaido Nippon-Ham Fighters.

In 2023 season, Umino achieved career-high results last year, but fell into a slump this season, appearing in only eight games in the Pacific League.

== International career ==
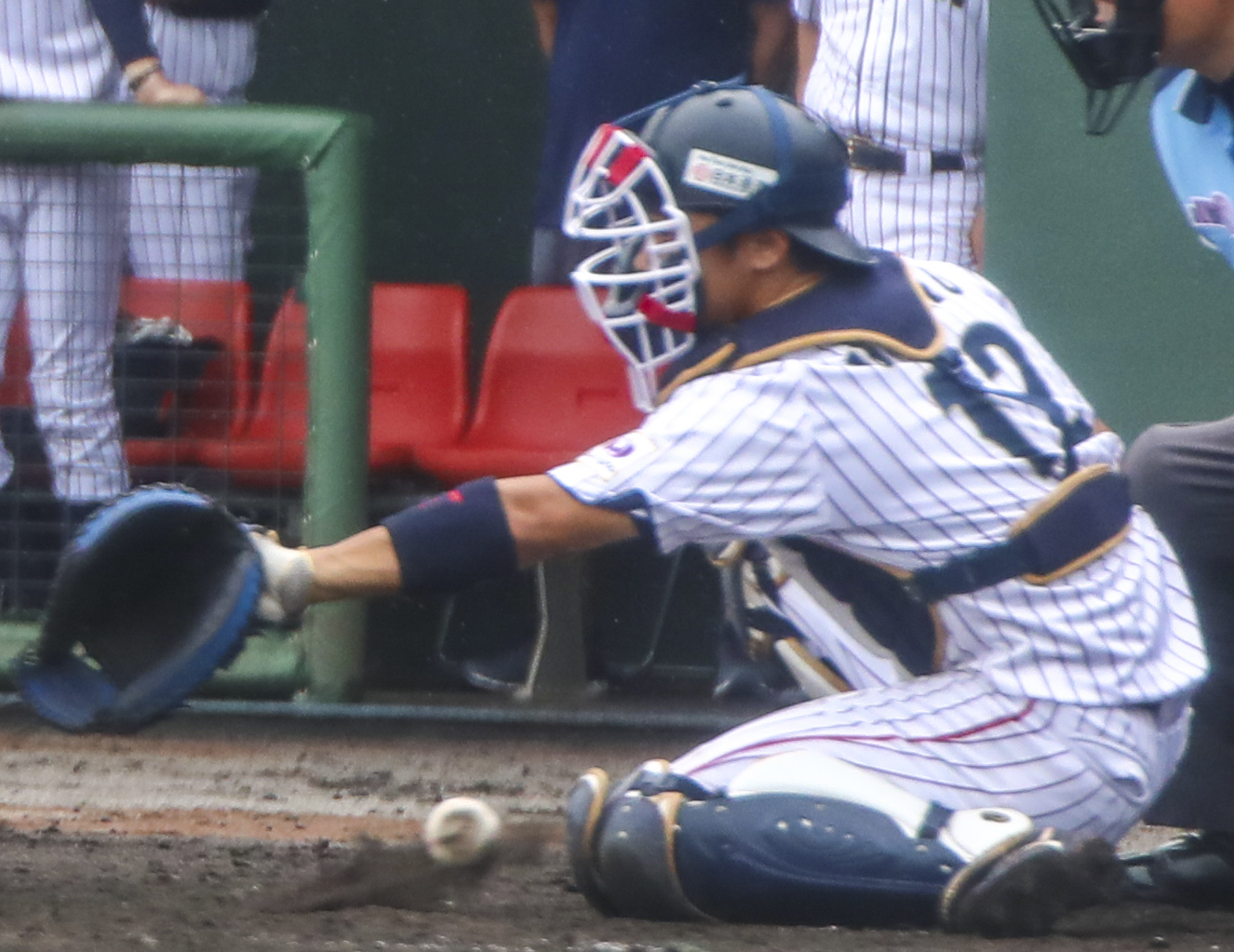
Umino playing for a team of Japanese college all-stars in 2019

Umino was elected to the Japan national baseball team at the 2018 Haarlem Baseball Week, and was elected to the Japan national baseball team at the 2018 USA VS Japan Collegiate All-Star Series and the 2019 USA VS Japan Collegiate All-Star Series.
