= Daiki Yoshida =

Japanese baseball player

- Pitcher
- Born: July 27, 1997 (age 28); Ibaraki, Osaka, Japan
- Batted: Right Threw: Right

NPB debut
- July 17, 2020, for the Tokyo Yakult Swallows

Last appearance
- May 22, 2022, for the Tokyo Yakult Swallows

Career statistics (through 2021 season)
- Win–loss record: 3-8
- Earned Run Average: 5.46
- Strikeouts: 79
- Saves: 0
- Holds: 0
- Stats at Baseball Reference

Teams
- Tokyo Yakult Swallows (2020–2023)

Daiki Yoshida (吉田 大喜, Yoshida Daiki; born July 27, 1996) is a Japanese professional baseball player. He plays pitcher for the Tokyo Yakult Swallows.
