= Shogo Tamamura =

Japanese baseball player (born 2001)

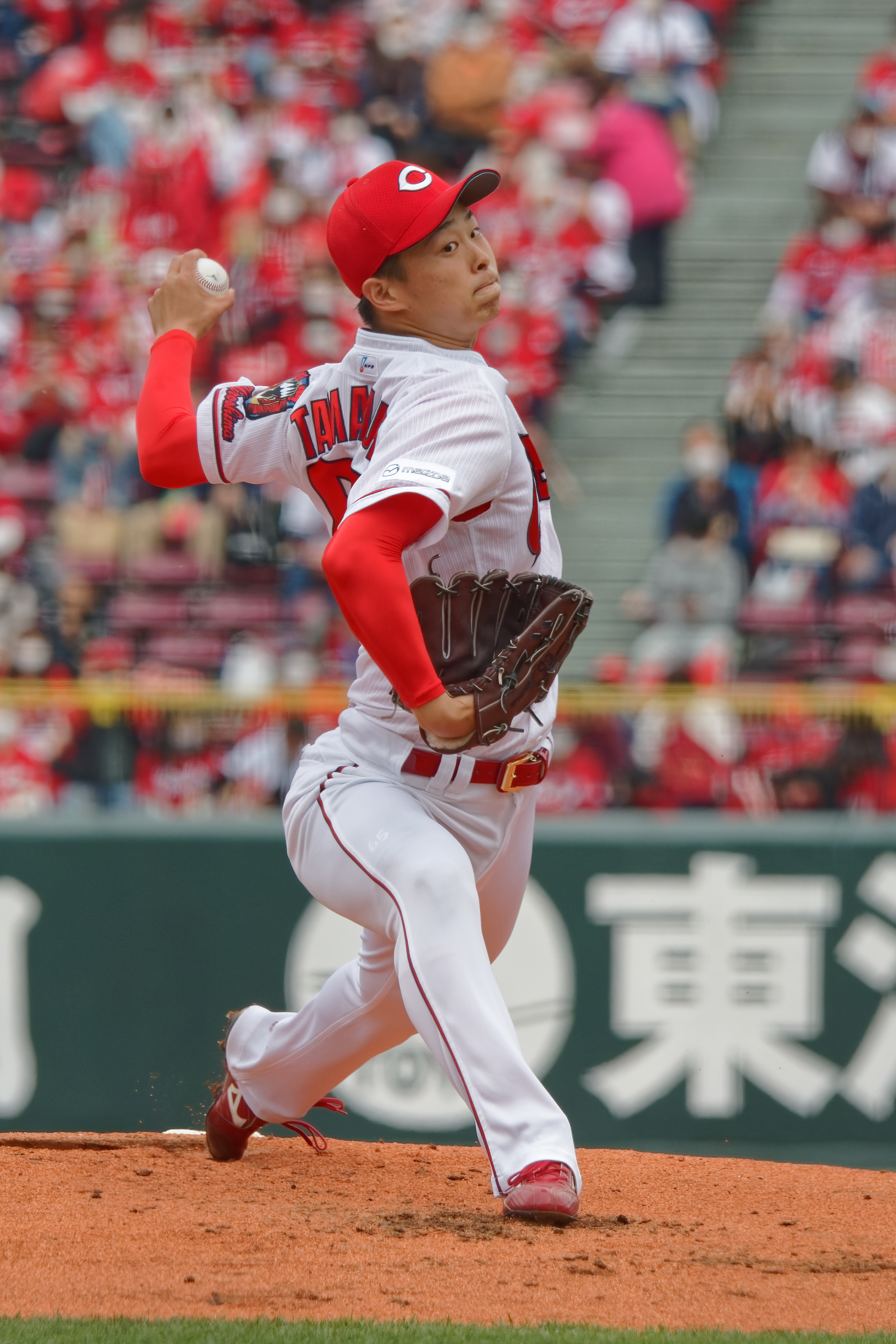

Hiroshima Toyo Carp – No. 65
- Pitcher
- Born: April 16, 2001 (age 24); Echizen, Fukui, Japan
- Bats: Left Throws: Left

NPB debut
- April 29, 2021, for the Hiroshima Toyo Carp

Career statistics (through 2023 season)
- Win-loss record: 9-10
- Earned run average: 4.12
- Strikeouts: 132
- Saves: 0
- Holds: 0

Teams
- Hiroshima Toyo Carp (2020-present)

Shogo Tamamura (玉村 昇悟, Tamamura Shogo; born April 16, 2001 in Echizen, Fukui, Japan) is a professional Japanese baseball player. He is a pitcher for the Hiroshima Toyo Carp of Nippon Professional Baseball (NPB).
