= Junichiro Kishi =

Japanese baseball player (born 1996)

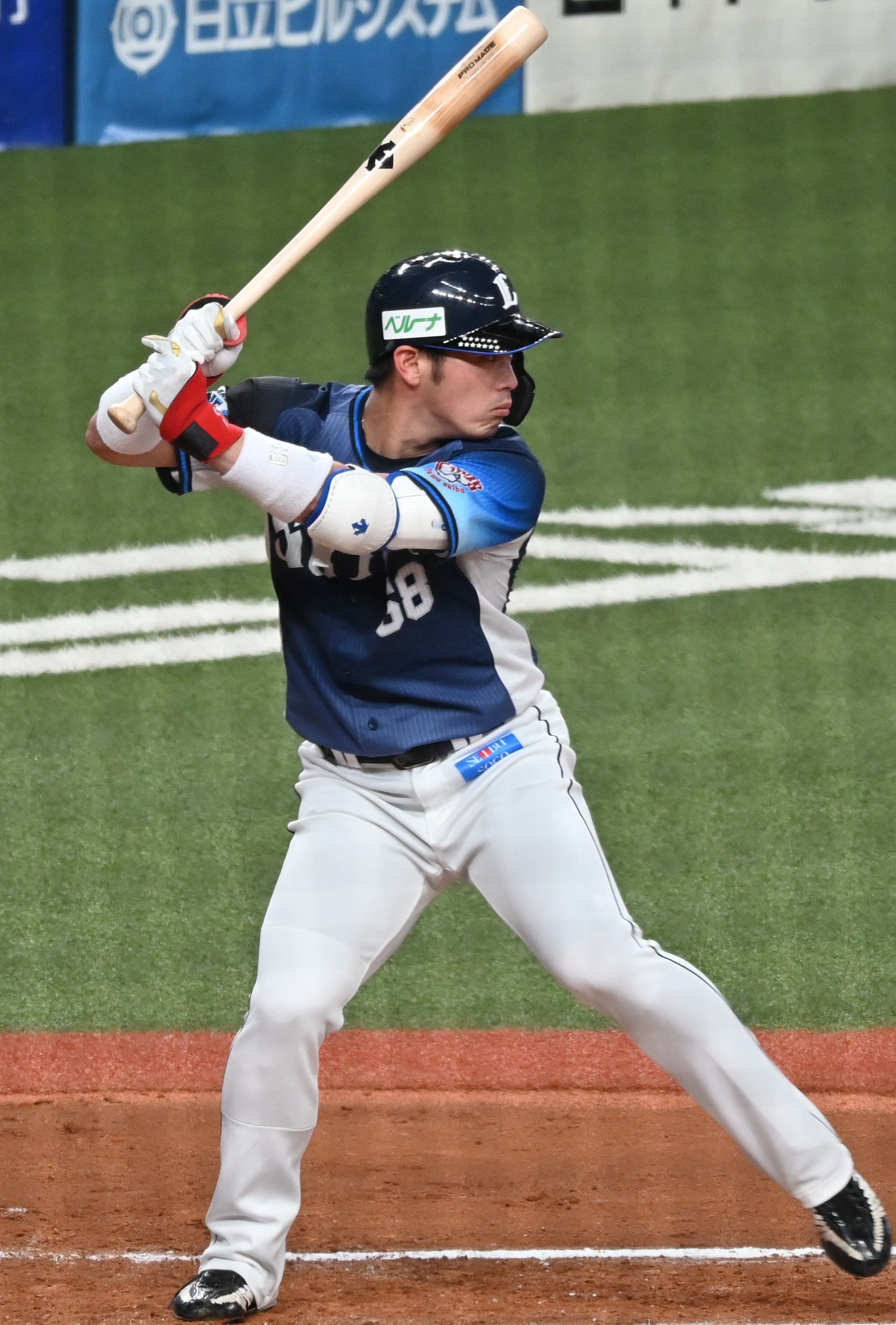

Saitama Seibu Lions – No. 68
- Outfielder
- Born: December 8, 1996 (age 29); Amagasaki, Hyōgo, Japan
- Bats: Right Throws: Right

NPB debut
- July 5, 2020, for the Saitama Seibu Lions

Career statistics (through April 6, 2022)
- Batting average: .224
- Home runs: 10
- RBIs: 31
- Stats at Baseball Reference

Teams
- Saitama Seibu Lions (2020-present)

Junichiro Kishi (岸 潤一郎, Kishi Junichiro; born December 8, 1996) is a professional Japanese baseball player. He is an outfielder for the Saitama Seibu Lions of Nippon Professional Baseball (NPB).
