= Dan Onodera =

Japanese baseball player (born 1998)

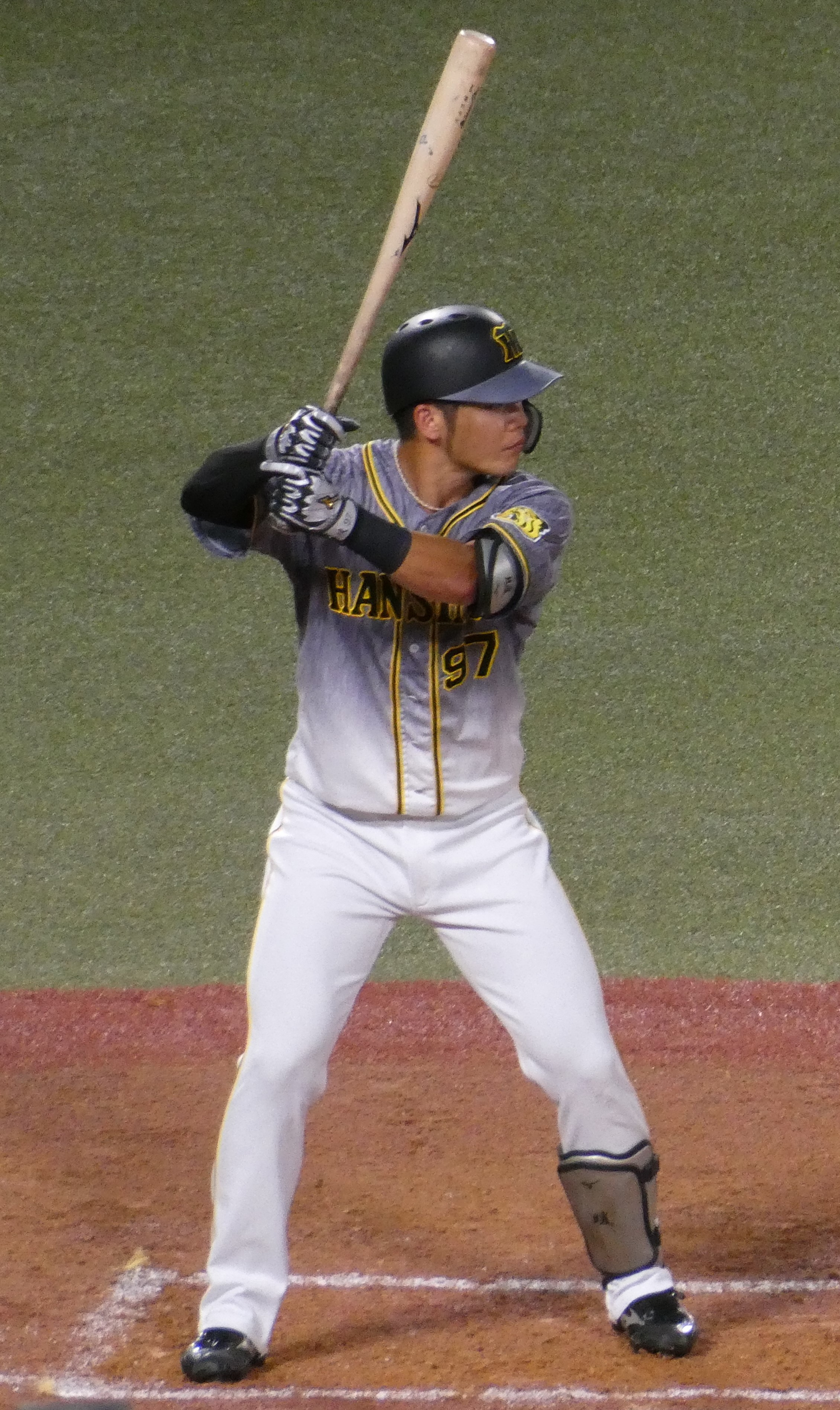

Hanshin Tigers – No. 60
- Outfielder
- Born: March 17, 1998 (age 28); Nara, Nara, Japan
- Bats: Right Throws: Right

NPB debut
- April 24, 2021, for the Hanshin Tigers

Career statistics (through 2024 season)
- Batting average: .227
- Home runs: 2
- Runs Batted In: 20

Teams
- Hanshin Tigers (2020–present)

Dan Onodera (小野寺 暖, Onodera Dan; born March 17, 1998) is a professional Japanese baseball outfielder for the Hanshin Tigers of Nippon Professional Baseball (NPB).
