= Hiroki Ohnishi =

Japanese baseball player (born 1997)

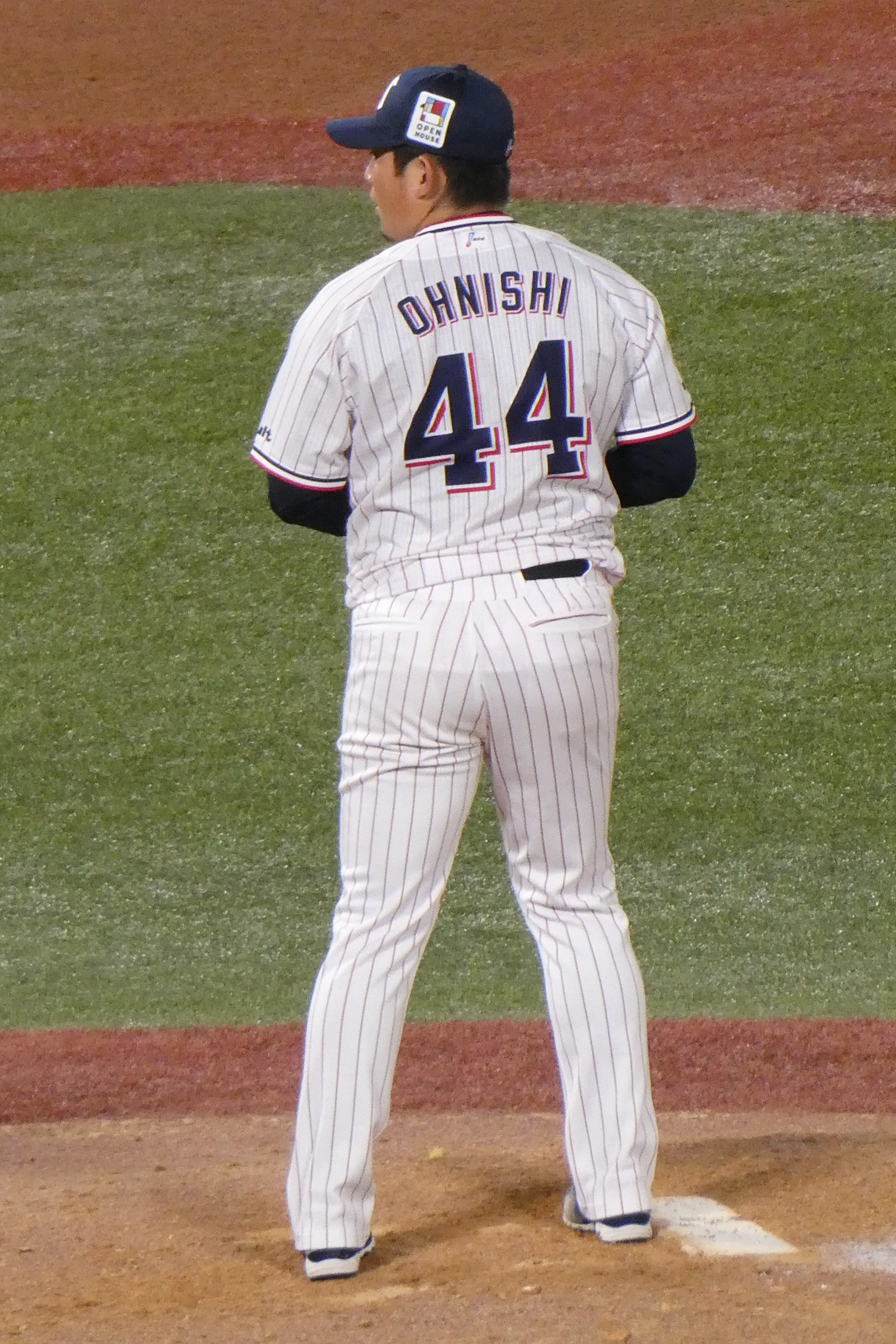

Tokyo Yakult Swallows – No. 44
- Pitcher
- Born: November 8, 1997 (age 28); Kashiba, Nara, Japan
- Bats: Right Throws: Right

NPB debut
- June 21, 2020, for the Tokyo Yakult Swallows

NPB statistics (through 2025 season)
- Win–loss record: 20–9
- Earned run average: 2.79
- Strikeouts: 173
- Stats at Baseball Reference

Teams
- Tokyo Yakult Swallows (2020–present)

Career highlights and awards
- 2× NPB All-Star (2024, 2025)

Hiroki Ohnishi (大西 広樹, Ohnishi Hiroki; born November 8, 1997) is a Japanese professional baseball pitcher for the Tokyo Yakult Swallows of Nippon Professional Baseball (NPB).
