= Okano (surname) =

Okano (written: 岡野) is a Japanese surname. Notable people with the surname include:

- Eitaro Okano (岡野 栄太郎; born 1930), Japanese sprinter
- Hideyuki Okano (岡野 栄之; born 1959), Japanese physiologist
- Isao Okano (岡野 功; born 1944), Japanese judoka
- Jun Okano (岡野 洵; born 1997), Japanese footballer
- Okano Keijirō (岡野 敬次郎; 1865–1925), Japanese politician
- Kōsuke Okano (岡野 浩介; born 1969), Japanese voice actor
- Masayuki Okano (岡野 雅行; born 1972), Japanese footballer
- Reiko Okano (岡野 玲子; born 1960), Japanese manga artist
- Shunichiro Okano (岡野 俊一郎; 1931–2017), Japanese footballer and manager
- Takeshi Okano (岡野 剛; born 1967), Japanese manga artist
- Teiichi Okano (岡野 貞一; 1878–1941), Japanese composer
- Tomoko Okano (岡野 知子; born 1979), Japanese volleyball player
- Yūichirō Okano (岡野 祐一郎; born 1994), Japanese baseball player
- Yuji Okano (born 1964), Japanese shot putter

== Fictional characters ==
- Hinata Okano (岡野 ひなた), a character in the manga series Assassination Classroom
