= Yūki Hashimoto (baseball) =

Japanese baseball player (born 1998)

Yūki Hashimoto 橋本 侑樹
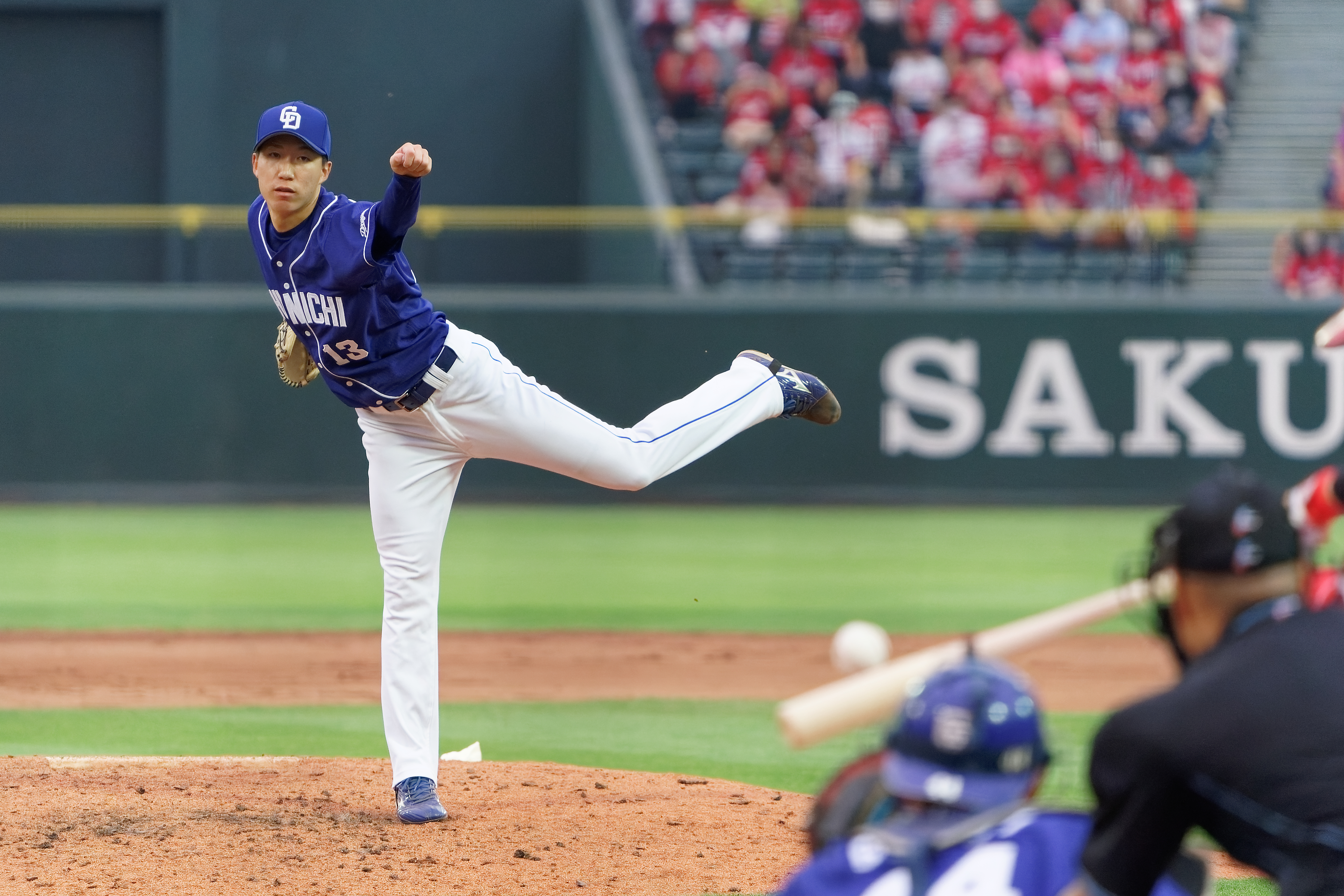

Chunichi Dragons – No. 13
- Pitcher
- Born: January 8, 1998 (age 28); Takahama, Fukui, Japan
- Bats: Left Throws: Left

NPB debut
- June 20, 2020, for the Chunichi Dragons

NPB statistics (through July 26, 2026)
- Win–loss record: 9–4
- Earned run average: 3.20
- Strikeouts: 175

Teams
- Chunichi Dragons (2020–present)

Yūki Hashimoto (橋本 侑樹, Hashimoto Yūki; born January 8, 1998 in Takahama, Fukui, Japan) is a professional Japanese baseball player. He plays pitcher for the Chunichi Dragons.

A native of Fukui prefecture, Hashimoto went to high school at Ogaki Nihon University High School in Gifu Prefecture where he appeared with the team at the Japanese High School Baseball Championship. Hashimoto later enrolled at Osaka University of Commerce where he threw a no-hitter in the Kansai6 Baseball League.

On 17 October 2019, Hashimoto was selected as the 2nd draft pick for the Chunichi Dragons at the 2019 NPB Draft and on 20 November signed a provisional contract with a ¥80,000,000 sign-on bonus and a ¥12,000,000 yearly salary.
