= Ryusei Kawano =

Japanese baseball player (born 1998)

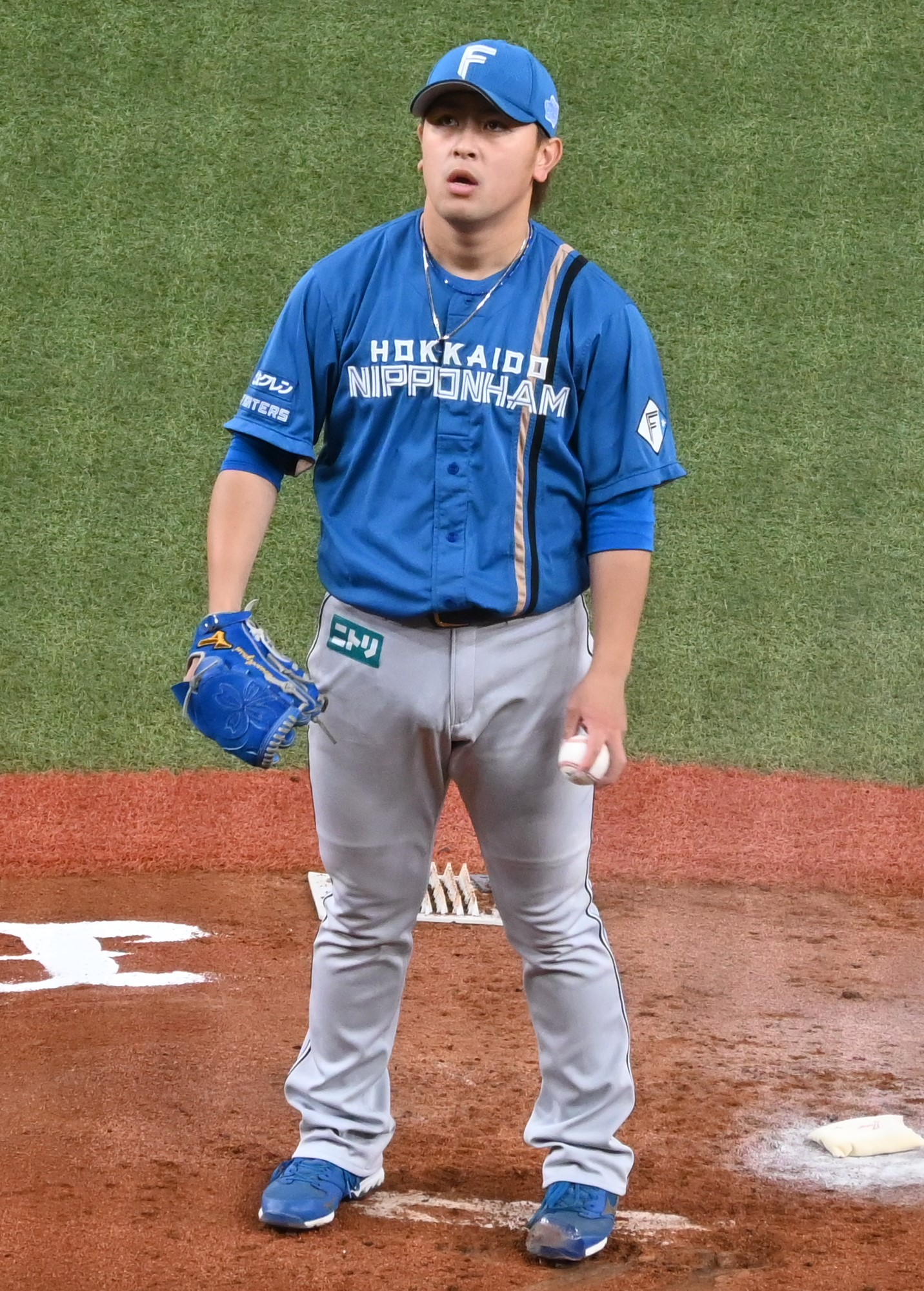

Hokkaido Nippon-Ham Fighters – No. 28
- Pitcher
- Born: May 30, 1998 (age 27); Naruto, Tokushima, Japan
- Bats: Left Throws: Left

NPB debut
- June 24, 2020, for the Hokkaido Nippon-Ham Fighters

Career statistics (through 2024 season)
- Win–loss record: 8–21
- Earned run average: 3.30
- Strikeouts: 204
- Saves: 1
- Holds: 63
- Stats at Baseball Reference

Teams
- Hokkaido Nippon-Ham Fighters (2020–present)

Career highlights and awards
- NPB All-Star (2024); 1× Pacific League Most Valuable Setup Pitcher (2024)

Ryusei Kawano (河野 竜生, Kawano Ryusei; born May 30, 1998, in Naruto, Tokushima, Japan) is a Japanese professional baseball pitcher for the Hokkaido Nippon-Ham Fighters of Nippon Professional Baseball (NPB).
