= Daiki Mochizuki =

Japanese baseball player

- Pitcher
- Born: February 1, 1998 (age 28); Funabashi, Chiba, Japan
- Bats: Right Throws: Right

NPB debut
- November 2, 2020, for the Hokkaido Nippon-Ham Fighters

Career statistics (through April 2, 2022)
- Win–loss record: 0–0
- Earned run average: 1.04
- Strikeouts: 4

Teams
- Hokkaido Nippon-Ham Fighters (2020–2022)

Daiki Mochizuki (望月 大希, Mochizuki Daiki; born February 1, 1998) is a professional Japanese baseball player. He is a pitcher for the Hokkaido Nippon-Ham Fighters of Nippon Professional Baseball (NPB).
