= Hiroaki Matsuda =

Japanese baseball player (born 1997)

Hiroaki Matsuda 松田 亘哲

Chunichi Dragons – No. 207
- Pitcher
- Born: May 16, 1997 (age 29); Iwakura, Aichi, Japan
- Bats: Left Throws: Left

Teams
- Chunichi Dragons (2020–present)

Hiroaki Matsuda (松田亘哲, Matsuda Hiroaki; born May 16, 1997) is a professional Japanese baseball player. He plays pitcher for the Chunichi Dragons.

== Early life ==
As a student of Aichi Prefectural Konan High School, as he was only 150cm tall he gave up playing baseball to play as a libero for the school's volleyball team. However, while at high school, Matsuda grew to 175cm and he looked to return to baseball at university.

In 2016, Matsuda passed the exam to enter the Economics Department of Nagoya University where he joined the baseball club.

On 17 October 2019, Matsuda was selected as the 1st draft pick in the development player round for the Chunichi Dragons at the 2019 NPB Draft and on 11 November signed a development player contract with a ¥2,000,000 moving allowance and a ¥3,000,000 yearly salary.

== Pitching style ==
Matsuda's fastball tops out at 148 km/h which he pairs with a cutter, slider, curveball, change-up and two-seam fastball.

== Personal ==
At University, his black rimmed glasses were his trademark but as he was selected by the Dragons, he upgraded to blue frames. He has said he aspires to be like Masahiro Yamamoto.
