= Daisuke Sobue =

Japanese baseball player (born 1987)

Daisuke Sobue 祖父江 大輔
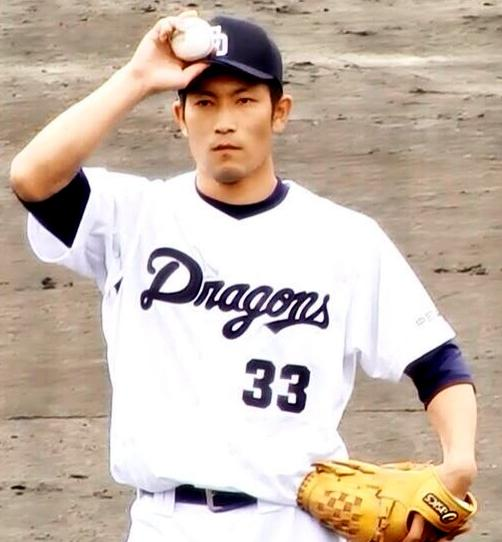
- Sobue with the Chunichi Dragons

Chunichi Dragons – No. 33
- Pitcher
- Born: August 11, 1987 (age 38); Nagoya, Aichi, Japan
- Bats: Left Throws: Right

debut
- April 4, 2014, for the Chunichi Dragons

Career statistics (through 2024 season)
- Win–loss record: 17-27
- Earned run average: 2.99
- Strikeouts: 331
- Saves: 12
- Holds: 135
- Stats at Baseball Reference

Teams
- Chunichi Dragons (2014–present)

Career highlights and awards
- Central League Most Valuable Setup pitcher (2020)

Daisuke Sobue (祖父江 大輔, Sobue Daisuke; born August 11, 1987) is a professional Japanese baseball player. He plays pitcher for the Chunichi Dragons.
