= Yūichirō Okano =

Japanese baseball player

Yūichirō Okano 岡野祐一郎
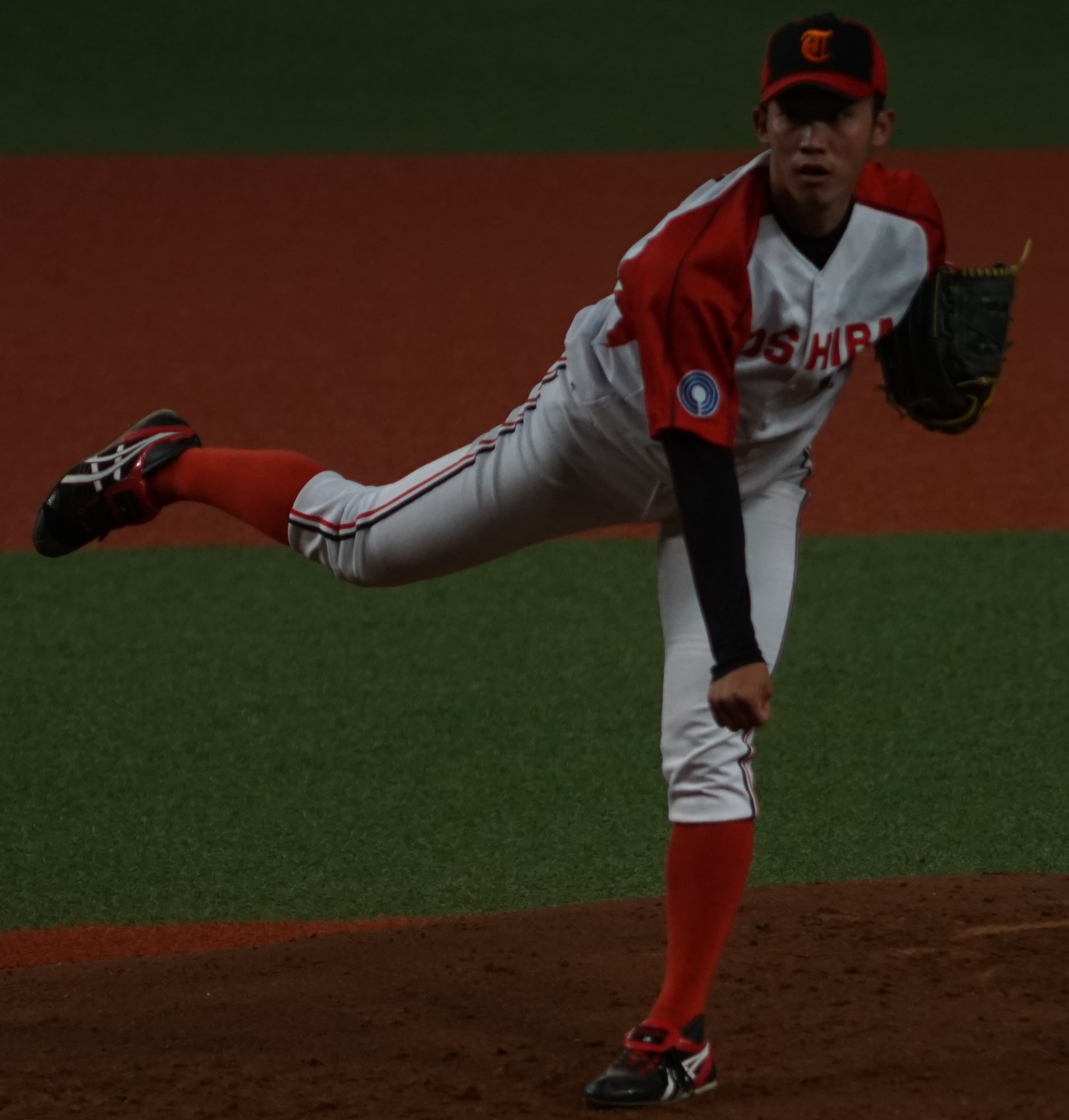

Chunichi Dragons – No. 36
- Pitcher
- Born: April 16, 1994 (age 31); Ishinomaki, Miyagi, Japan
- Bats: Right Throws: Right

NPB debut
- 24 June 2020, for the Chunichi Dragons

NPB statistics (through 2020)
- Win–loss record: 2-2
- Innings pitched: 42.1
- Earned run average: 6.17
- Strikeouts: 41
- Stats at Baseball Reference

Teams
- Chunichi Dragons (2020–present)

Yūichirō Okano (岡野祐一郎, Okano Yūichirō; born April 16, 1994 in Ishinomaki, Miyagi, Japan) is a professional Japanese baseball player. He plays pitcher for the Chunichi Dragons.

On 17 October 2019, Okano was selected as the 3rd draft pick for the Chunichi Dragons at the 2019 NPB Draft and on 20 November signed a provisional contract with a ¥70,000,000 sign-on bonus and a ¥12,000,000 yearly salary. He was presented the number 36 previously vacated by Ryota Ishioka.
