= Honsading, California =

Former Hupa settlement in California

Honsading (also, Aknutl, Hoonselton, Hoonsolton, Hun-sa-tung, Loonsolton, Oka-no, and Okahno) was a former Hupa settlement in Humboldt County, California, United States. It was located on the right bank of the Trinity River near Hupa Valley; its precise location is unknown.
