= Kenshin Hotta =

Japanese baseball player (born 2001)

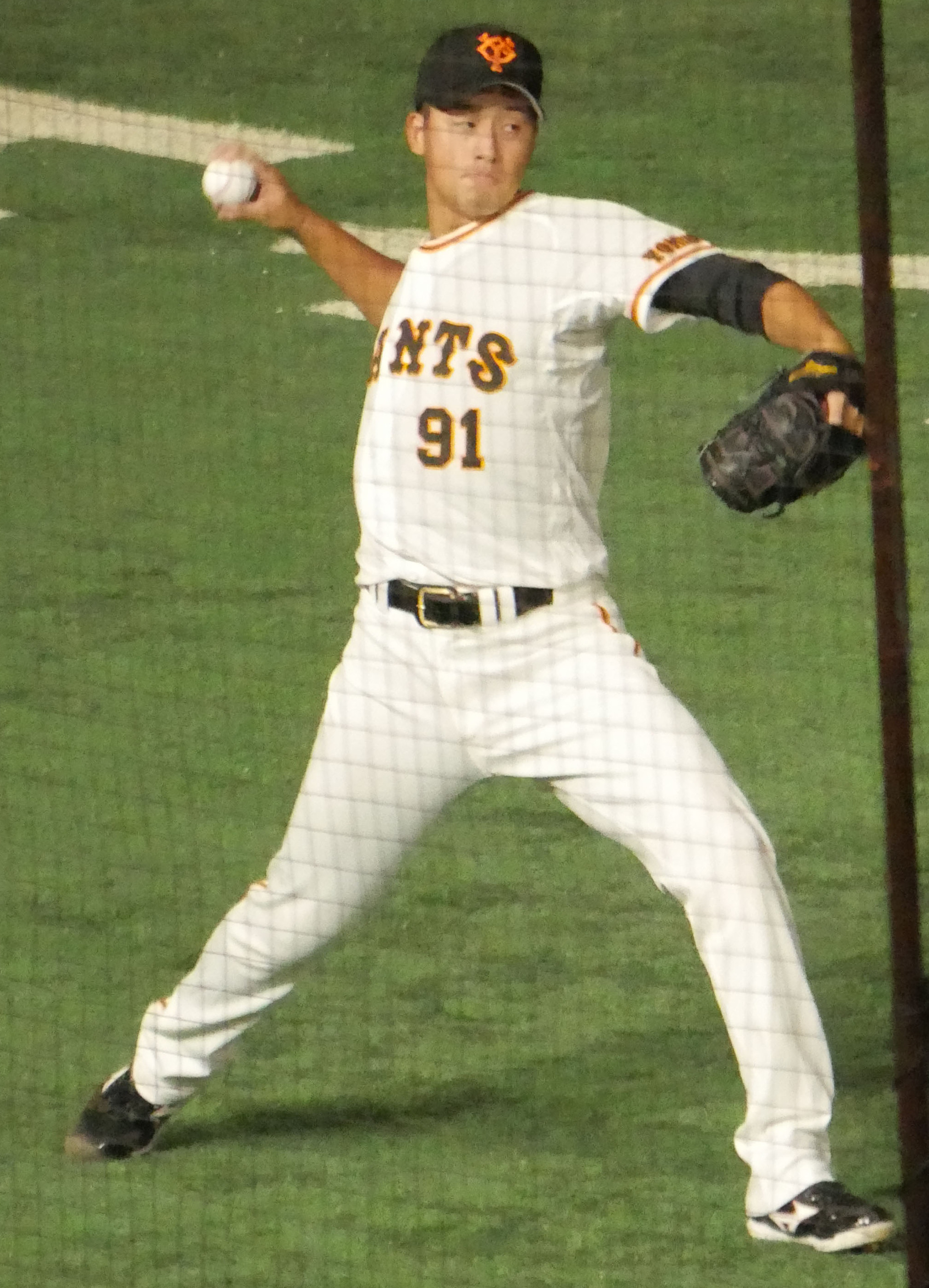

Yomiuri Giants – No. 91
- Pitcher
- Born: May 21, 2001 (age 25); Hanamaki, Iwate, Japan
- Bats: Right Throws: Right

NPB debut
- March 31, 2022, for the Yomiuri Giants

Career statistics (through August 1, 2026)
- Win–loss record: 6-7
- Earned Run Average: 3.73
- Strikeouts: 13
- Stats at Baseball Reference

Teams
- Yomiuri Giants (2022-present)

Kenshin Hotta (堀田 賢慎, Hotta Kenshin; born May 21, 2001) is a professional Japanese baseball player. He is a pitcher for the Yomiuri Giants of Nippon Professional Baseball (NPB).
