= Yuki Hashimoto (politician) =

Japanese politician

- 橋本ゆき
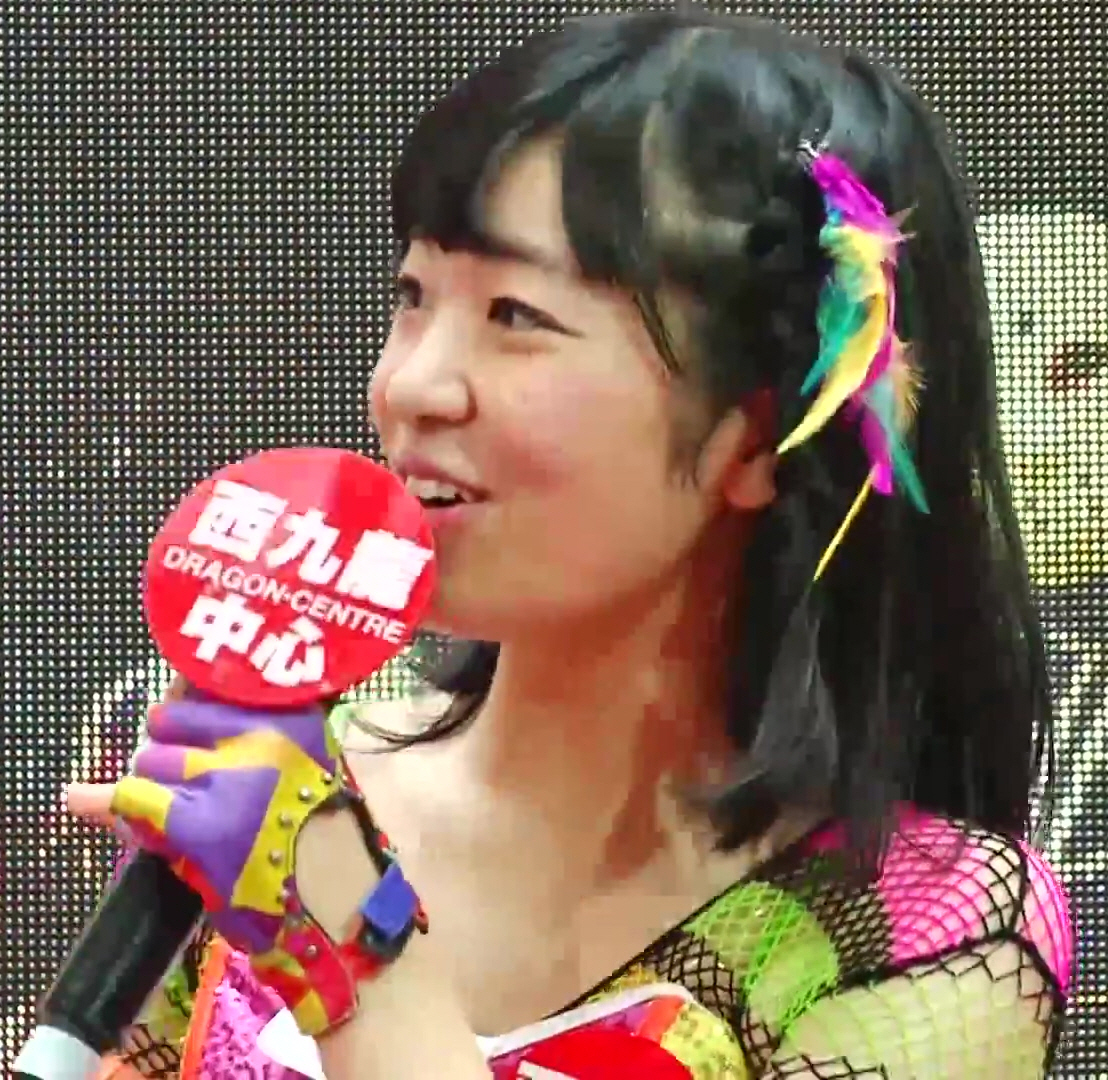

Member of Shibuya City Assembly
- Incumbent
- Assumed office 2019-04-22

Personal details
- Party: Atarashī-tō ("New Party")
- Education: The University of Tokyo (BA)

Yuki Hashimoto (Japanese: 橋本ゆき; born 1992) is a member of the Shibuya City Assembly and was formerly a member of the Japanese idol group Kamen Joshi.

== Career ==
=== Idol ===
In 2012, Hashimoto joined Japanese idol agency Alice Project, where she began a successful career as an idol under the name Yuki Sakura (Japanese: 桜雪). She started as a founding member of the group Steamgirls, and later joined the groups Alice Juban and Kamen Joshi.

While continuing performing as an idol, Hashimoto also attended The University of Tokyo. After graduating in 2016 with a degree in psychology, she attended the political school Kibo no Juku (Japanese: 希望の塾) or Academy of Hope.

=== Shibuya City Diet Member ===
In April 2019, Hashimoto was elected as a member of the Shibuya City Assembly, becoming the youngest member in the Assembly's history. She ran as a member of the Atarashī-tō (Japanese: あたらしい党)("New Party"), a forward-thinking liberal party. She received 2,376 votes, the fourth most votes out of the 55 candidates.

In 2023, Hashimoto founded and became the CEO of Tsugiste (Japanese: ツギステ), a career guidance service specializing in former idols.
