= Junya Nishi =

Japanese baseball player (born 2001)

Junya Nishi Jun Nishi
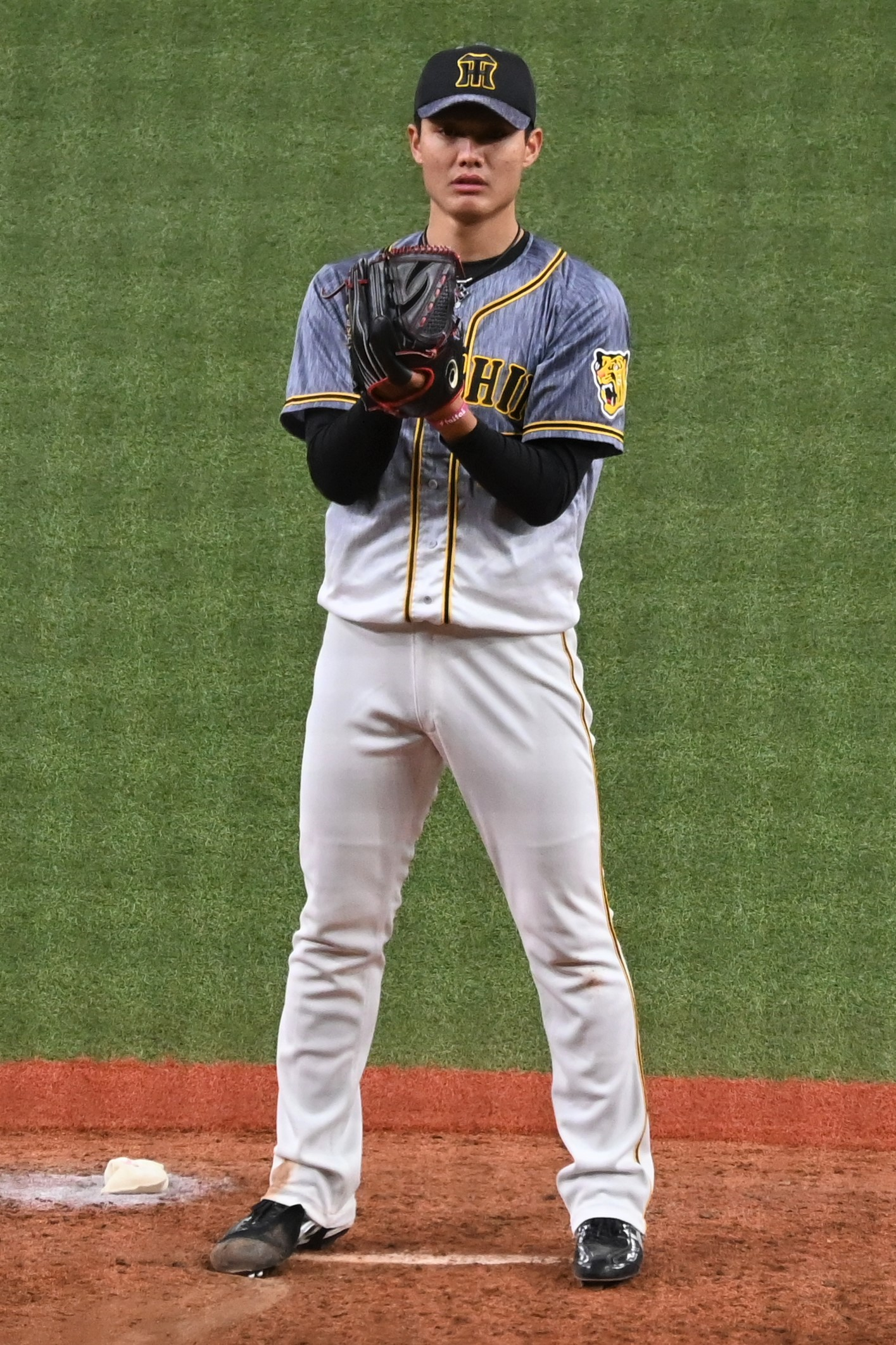

Hanshin Tigers – No. 120
- Pitcher, Outfielder
- Born: September 13, 2001 (age 24); Hatsukaichi, Hiroshima
- Bats: Right Throws: Right

NPB debut
- May 19, 2021, for the Hanshin Tigers

NPB statistics (through 2024 season)
- Win–loss record: 12-7
- ERA: 3.23
- Strikeouts: 107
- Saves: 0
- Holds: 0
- Stats at Baseball Reference

Teams
- Hanshin Tigers (2020–present)

Career highlights and awards
- 1× Japan Series Champion (2023)

Junya Nishi (西 純矢, Nishi Junya; born September 13, 2001) is a Japanese professional baseball pitcher for the Hanshin Tigers in Japan's Nippon Professional Baseball (NPB). His registered name is Jun Nishi (西純, Nishi Jun)

== Early baseball career ==
Junya started playing little league baseball in second grade for the Suzugamine Reds, and continued to play for the Young Hiroshima team of Ajinadai Junior High. His talent earned him a selection to the national team Nomo Japan in his third year of junior high.

He attended Soshi Gakuen High in the neighboring prefecture of Okayama, and joined their baseball team as a pitcher. While he did not get any playing time as a freshman, he led his team as the ace and cleanup hitter in his second year to participate in the 2018 Summer Koshien Tournament where he gained nationwide recognition.

On top of notching 2 hits during the 1st round against Sohseikan High, he singlehandedly pitched a shutout win, giving away only 4 hits and striking out 16 with at least one batter struck out per inning. This was the first time since 1948 that a second year pitcher achieved this feat of a shutout win with 16 KOs, no walks or hit by pitch during the Summer Koshien tournament. They got eliminated in the 2nd round however, when a consecutive walk and hit by pitch cost them 3 runs in the 9th inning against Shimonoseki High. He finished the tournament with a 2.0 ERA, 7 surrendered hits and 25 KOs in 18 innings.

Despite his school not making it to any national tournaments in his senior year, he was chosen to play for the Samurai Japan team in the U-18 Baseball World Cup. Among the pitchers in the tournament, he had the most appearances (4 games, 13.3 innings) and finished with a 1.35 ERA. He was also awarded the tournament's home run title for batting 2 home runs, which he notched as a designated hitter in the game against South Africa where he drove in a total of 8 runs. He finished high school with 25 home runs to his name and was one of the top prospects of the 2019 draft for his two-way potential.

== Hanshin Tigers ==
He was the 1st round pick of the Hanshin Tigers in the 2019 Nippon Professional Baseball draft (their second alternative choice after they lost the lottery for Yasunobu Okugawa). He inked a 100 million yen contract and a 30 million yen signing bonus with the Tigers for a 12 million yen annual salary, and was assigned the jersey number 15.

== Playing style ==
A 6-foot tall right handed pitcher with an overhand delivery, he pitches a four-seam fastball in the 150 km/h (93 mph) range as his main pitch (maxed at 154 km/h (96 mph)), coupled with a slider and a forkball. His arsenal also included in his arsenal are a curveball, changeup and a splitter.

== Personal life ==
He is a third cousin of Yuki Nishi, the former ace of the Orix Buffaloes who now pitches for the Tigers. Their grandfathers were brothers but he and Yuki have never met in person until they joined the Tigers.

As a kid, he was a fan of the Hiroshima Carp and looked up to their ace pitcher Kenta Maeda who now plays in the majors.

When Junya was a freshman, his father collapsed on the way home from watching one of his son's matches and ultimately died. That's why when his team reached the nationals on the following year, he decided to dedicate his matches to his father and he would sometimes do a celebratory fist pump on the mound with his chest facing the heavens after taking out a batter. As he did this several times in his games, it caught the attention of the tournament runners and issued him a warning for what was construed as a showy display. The umpire also issued him the same warning on the 2nd round of the tournament, and despite that day being his late father's birthday, Junya suppressed the urge to fist pump and subsequently lost the match.
