= Yasunobu Okugawa =

Japanese baseball player (born 2001)

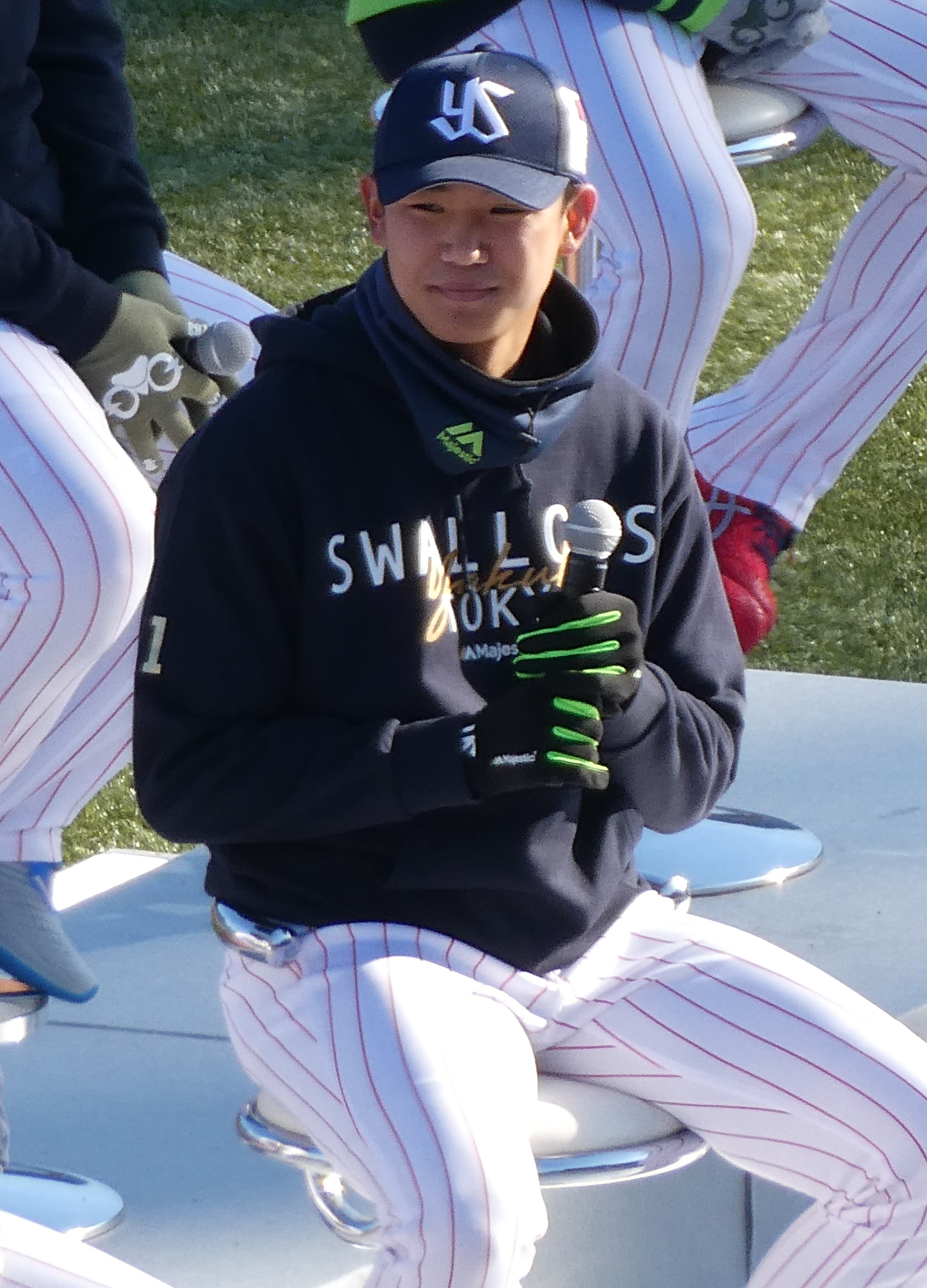
- Okugawa with the Tokyo Yakult Swallows

Tokyo Yakult Swallows – No. 18
- Pitcher
- Born: April 16, 2001 (age 24); Kahoku, Ishikawa, Japan
- Bats: Right Throws: Right

NPB debut
- November 10, 2020, for the Tokyo Yakult Swallows

Career statistics (through 2025 season)
- Win–loss record: 16–15
- Earned run average: 3.77
- Strikeouts: 185
- Stats at Baseball Reference

Teams
- Tokyo Yakult Swallows (2020–present)

Career highlights and awards
- Japan Series champion (2021)

Yasunobu Okugawa (奥川 恭伸, Okugawa Yasunobu; born April 16, 2001) is a professional Japanese baseball pitcher for the Tokyo Yakult Swallows of Nippon Professional Baseball (NPB).

== Career ==
On October 30, 2022, it was announced that Okugawa would require Tommy John surgery, but he would later decide to bypass surgery and rehab the injury instead.
