= 2020 Nippon Professional Baseball season =

71st annual season of Nippon Professional Baseball

2020 NPB season
- League: Nippon Professional Baseball
- Sport: Baseball
- Duration: June 19 – November 25
- Games: 120
- Teams: 12

Central League pennant
- League champions: Yomiuri Giants
- Runners-up: Hanshin Tigers
- Season MVP: Tomoyuki Sugano (Yomiuri)

Pacific League pennant
- League champions: Fukuoka SoftBank Hawks
- Runners-up: Chiba Lotte Marines
- Season MVP: Yuki Yanagita (SoftBank)

Climax Series
- CL champions: N/A
- CL runners-up: N/A
- PL champions: Fukuoka SoftBank Hawks
- PL runners-up: Chiba Lotte Marines

Japan Series
- Venue: Fukuoka PayPay Dome, Chūō-ku, Fukuoka; Kyocera Dome Osaka, Nishi-ku, Osaka
- Champions: Fukuoka SoftBank Hawks
- Runners-up: Yomiuri Giants
- Finals MVP: Ryoya Kurihara (SoftBank)

NPB seasons
- ← 2019 2021 →

The 2020 Nippon Professional Baseball season was the 71st season of professional baseball in Japan since Nippon Professional Baseball (NPB) was reorganized in 1950. There were 12 NPB teams, split evenly between the Central League and Pacific League.

== Season schedule ==
The 2020 season was originally scheduled to begin on 20 March, with a break from 21 July to 13 August, for the 2020 Tokyo Olympics. On 26 February 2020, the league announced that its remaining spring training games would be held without fans in attendance, due to the COVID-19 pandemic in Japan. With health related precautions in place, the media was allowed into some ballparks. Following another league meeting on 9 March, commissioner Atsushi Saito stated that the 2020 season would be postponed until April. Saito also said that the league aimed to retain a full regular season schedule of 143 games. This announcement marked the first time since 2011 that a Nippon Professional Baseball season was delayed.

On 18 April, the league announced that it would remain delayed indefinitely through the entirety of May, with the 18-game interleague schedule removed to accommodate a 125-game schedule. The delay of the 2020 Olympics meant that the three-week Olympic break would no longer be needed. Therefore, it was removed from the schedule. Before the league began play, the 2020 season was shortened to 120 games, and scheduled to end on 7 November. As a result of the condensed schedule, it was also announced that the first stage of the Pacific League Climax Series would not be played, with the top two teams from the regular season competing in a best-of-5 final stage which the regular season winner enters with a one-game advantage. The Central League would do away with its Climax Series entirely, with its regular season winner advancing directly to the 2020 Japan Series.

With the lifting of states of emergency over major Japanese cities, NPB announced that it would begin its regular season on 19 June behind closed doors. "Warm-up" games began 26 May. All twelve NPB teams played on as scheduled on 19 June. On 10 July NPB began allowing a limited number of fans to attend games, with plans to further ease restrictions in the near future. On 19 September, attendance was expanded to a maximum of 20,000 fans per game, or 50% of stadium capacity.

== Regular season standings ==
Central League regular season standings
Pos	Team	G	W	L	T	Pct.	GB
1	Yomiuri Giants	120	67	45	8	.598	-
2	Hanshin Tigers	120	60	53	7	.531	7.5
3	Chunichi Dragons	120	60	55	5	.522	8.5
4	Yokohama DeNA BayStars	120	56	58	6	.491	12
5	Hiroshima Toyo Carp	120	52	56	12	.481	13
6	Tokyo Yakult Swallows	120	41	69	10	.373	25

Pacific League regular season standings
Pos	Team	G	W	L	T	Pct.	GB
1	Fukuoka SoftBank Hawks	120	73	42	5	.635	-
2	Chiba Lotte Marines	120	60	57	3	.513	14
3	Saitama Seibu Lions	120	58	58	4	.500	15.5
4	Tohoku Rakuten Golden Eagles	120	55	57	8	.491	16.5
5	Hokkaido Nippon-Ham Fighters	120	53	62	5	.461	20
6	Orix Buffaloes	120	45	68	7	.398	27

== Climax Series ==
Pacific League Climax Series			Japan Series
			CL1	Yomiuri Giants	0
1	Fukuoka SoftBank Hawks	3	PL1	Fukuoka SoftBank Hawks	4
2	Chiba Lotte Marines	0

=== Pacific League ===
Fukuoka SoftBank Hawks won the series, 3–0.

Game	Date	Score	Location	Time	Attendance
1	November 14	Chiba Lotte Marines – 3, Fukuoka SoftBank Hawks – 4	PayPay Dome	3:19	19,901
2	November 15	Chiba Lotte Marines – 4, Fukuoka SoftBank Hawks – 6	PayPay Dome	3:27	19,995

== Japan Series ==
Fukuoka SoftBank Hawks won the series, 4–0.

Game	Date	Score	Location	Time	Attendance
1	November 21	Fukuoka SoftBank Hawks – 5, Yomiuri Giants – 1	Kyocera Dome Osaka	3:34	16,489
2	November 22	Fukuoka SoftBank Hawks – 13, Yomiuri Giants – 2	Kyocera Dome Osaka	3:40	16,333
3	November 24	Yomiuri Giants – 0, Fukuoka SoftBank Hawks – 4	PayPay Dome	2:58	17,297
4	November 25	Yomiuri Giants – 1, Fukuoka SoftBank Hawks – 4	PayPay Dome	3:22	19,679

== League leaders ==
=== Central League ===
Batting leaders
Stat	Player	Team	Total
Batting average	Keita Sano	Yokohama DeNA BayStars	.328
Home runs	Kazuma Okamoto	Yomiuri Giants	31
Runs batted in	Kazuma Okamoto	Yomiuri Giants	97
Runs	Kazuma Okamoto	Yomiuri Giants	97
Hits	Yohei Oshima	Chunichi Dragons	146
Stolen bases	Kōji Chikamoto	Hanshin Tigers	31
On-base percentage	Munetaka Murakami	Tokyo Yakult Swallows	.427
Slugging percentage	Munetaka Murakami	Tokyo Yakult Swallows	.585

Pitching leaders
Stat	Player	Team	Total
Wins	Tomoyuki Sugano	Yomiuri Giants	14
Earned run average	Yudai Ono	Chunichi Dragons	1.82
Strikeouts	Yudai Ono	Chunichi Dragons	148
Innings pitched	Yudai Ono	Chunichi Dragons	148.2
Saves	Robert Suárez	Hanshin Tigers	25
Holds	Daisuke Sobue	Chunichi Dragons	30
Winning percentage	Tomoyuki Sugano	Yomiuri Giants	.875

=== Pacific League ===
Batting leaders
Stat	Player	Team	Total
Batting average	Masataka Yoshida	Orix Buffaloes	.350
Home runs	Hideto Asamura	Tohoku Rakuten Golden Eagles	32
Runs batted in	Sho Nakata	Hokkaido Nippon-Ham Fighters	108
Runs	Yuki Yanagita	Fukuoka SoftBank Hawks	90
Hits	Yuki Yanagita	Fukuoka SoftBank Hawks	146
Stolen bases	Ukyo Shuto	Saitama Seibu Lions	50
On-base percentage	Kensuke Kondo	Hokkaido Nippon Ham Fighters	.465
Slugging percentage	Yuki Yanagita	Fukuoka SoftBank Hawks	.623

Pitching leaders
Stat	Player	Team	Total
Wins	Shuta Ishikawa Kodai Senga	Fukuoka SoftBank Hawks	11
Earned run average	Kodai Senga	Fukuoka SoftBank Hawks	2.16
Strikeouts	Kodai Senga	Fukuoka SoftBank Hawks	149
Innings pitched	Ayumu Ishikawa	Chiba Lotte Marines	133.1
Saves	Tatsushi Masuda	Saitama Seibu Lions	33
Holds	Livan Moinelo	Fukuoka SoftBank Hawks	40
Winning percentage	Hideaki Wakui	Tohoku Rakuten Golden Eagles	.733

== Awards ==
=== Regular season ===
NPB Awards
	Central League		Pacific League	
Award	Player	Team	Player	Team
Rookie of the Year	Masato Morishita	Hiroshima Toyo Carp	Kaima Taira	Saitama Seibu Lions
Most Valuable Player	Tomoyuki Sugano	Yomiuri Giants	Yuki Yanagita	Fukuoka SoftBank Hawks
Eiji Sawamura Award	Yūdai Ōno	Chunichi Dragons		
Best Relief Pitcher	Noboru Shimizu; Daisuke Sobue; Hiroto Fuku	Tokyo Yakult Swallows; Chunichi Dragons; Chunichi Dragons	Liván Moinelo	Fukuoka SoftBank Hawks
Matsutaro Shoriki Award			Kimiyasu Kudo	Fukuoka SoftBank Hawks
Best Nine Award
Position	Player	Team	Player	Team
Pitcher	Tomoyuki Sugano	Yomiuri Giants	Kodai Senga	Fukuoka SoftBank Hawks
Catcher	Takumi Ohshiro	Yomiuri Giants	Takuya Kai	Fukuoka SoftBank Hawks
1st Base	Munetaka Murakami	Tokyo Yakult Swallows	Sho Nakata	Hokkaido Nippon-Ham Fighters
2nd Base	Ryosuke Kikuchi	Hiroshima Toyo Carp	Hideto Asamura	Tohoku Rakuten Golden Eagles
3rd Base	Kazuma Okamoto	Yomiuri Giants	Daichi Suzuki	Tohoku Rakuten Golden Eagles
Shortstop	Hayato Sakamoto	Yomiuri Giants	Sosuke Genda	Saitama Seibu Lions
Outfield	Yoshihiro Maru	Yomiuri Giants	Masataka Yoshida	Orix Buffaloes
Outfield	Seiya Suzuki	Hiroshima Toyo Carp	Kensuke Kondo	Hokkaido Nippon-Ham Fighters
Outfield	Keita Sano	Yokohama DeNA BayStars	Yuki Yanagita	Fukuoka SoftBank Hawks
Designated hitter	Not applicable		Takumi Kuriyama	Saitama Seibu Lions

Mitsui Golden Glove Award
	Central League		Pacific League	
Position	Player	Team	Player	Team
Pitcher	Tomoyuki Sugano	Yomiuri Giants	Kodai Senga	Fukuoka SoftBank Hawks
Catcher	Ryutaro Umeno	Hanshin Tigers	Takuya Kai	Fukuoka SoftBank Hawks
1st Base	Dayán Viciedo	Chunichi Dragons	Akira Nakamura; Sho Nakata	Fukuoka SoftBank Hawks; Hokkaido Nippon-Ham Fighters
2nd Base	Ryosuke Kikuchi	Hiroshima Toyo Carp	Shuta Tonosaki	Saitama Seibu Lions
3rd Base	Shuhei Takahashi	Chunichi Dragons	Daichi Suzuki	Tohoku Rakuten Golden Eagles
Shortstop	Hayato Sakamoto	Yomiuri Giants	Sosuke Genda	Saitama Seibu Lions
Outfield	Seiya Suzuki	Hiroshima Toyo Carp	Yuki Yanagita	Fukuoka SoftBank Hawks
Outfield	Yōhei Ōshima	Chunichi Dragons	Taishi Ohta	Hokkaido Nippon-Ham Fighters
Outfield	Norichika Aoki	Tokyo Yakult Swallows	Haruki Nishikawa	Hokkaido Nippon-Ham Fighters

== See also ==
- 2020 in baseball
- 2020 Major League Baseball season
- 2020 KBO League season
- 2020 Chinese Professional Baseball League season
- Impact of the COVID-19 pandemic on baseball

== Notes ==
1.The 2020 Central League Climax Series was cancelled. As a result, the regular season champion Yomiuri Giants advanced directly to the Japan Series.
