= 2019 Central League Climax Series =

First stage
Team (Wins)		Manager	Season
Hanshin Tigers (2)		Akihiro Yano	69–68–6 (.504), 6 GB
Yokohama DeNA BayStars (1)		Alex Ramirez	71–69–3 (.507), 5.5 GB
- Dates: October 5–7

Final stage
Team (Wins)		Manager	Season
Yomiuri Giants (4)		Tatsunori Hara	77–64–2 (.546), 5.5 GA
Hanshin Tigers (1)		Akihiro Yano	69–68–6 (.504), 6 GB
- Dates: October 9–13
- MVP: Kazuma Okamoto (Yomiuri)

The 2019 Central League Climax Series (CLCS) was a postseason playoff consisting of two consecutive series that determined which of the three teams who finished in the top three during the 2019 regular season would represent the Central League in the Japan Series. The First Stage was a best-of-three series played between the second-place hosts Yokohama DeNA BayStars and the third-place Hanshin Tigers. The series was played between October 5 to 7. The Tigers defeated the Baystars 2–1 and advanced to the Final Stage to face the pennant-winning Yomiuri Giants.

The Final Stage was a best-of-six series hosted by the Giants. Having won the regular season, Yomiuri was awarded a one-win advantage over the Tigers. The series was played between October 9 to 13. Yomiuri defeated Hanshin 4–1 in four games to advance to the 2019 Japan Series, where they competed against the 2019 Pacific League Climax Series winner, the Fukuoka SoftBank Hawks.

== First stage ==
The Yokohama DeNA Baystars clinched second place in the Central League on September 24 and thus secured a spot as the home team in the First Stage of the Climax Series. It was their highest finish in the standings since winning the CL pennant in 1998. While they had hosted Japan Series games in 1998 and 2017, this was the first time in team history that their home field, Yokohama Stadium, hosted a Climax Series. The BayStars finished the season 43-27-1 at Yokohama Stadium, the most wins by any CL team in its home park. The Hanshin Tigers, however, also had a winning record in Yokohama, going 8–4.

The Tigers clinched third place in the Central League on September 30, the last game of the regular season. They won the last six games of the season to help pass the Hiroshima Toyo Carp by half a game and secure the third and final postseason position. Hanshin was 16–8–1 against the Baystars during the regular season and had won six of their last seven meetings.

=== Series summary ===
Hanshin Tigers won the series, 2–1.

Game	Date	Score	Location	Time	Attendance
1	October 5	Hanshin Tigers – 8, Yokohama DeNA BayStars – 7	Yokohama Stadium	3:57	31,832
2	October 6	Hanshin Tigers – 4, Yokohama DeNA BayStars – 6	Yokohama Stadium	3:51	31,818
3	October 7	Hanshin Tigers – 2, Yokohama DeNA BayStars – 1	Yokohama Stadium	3:57	31,807

=== Game 1 ===
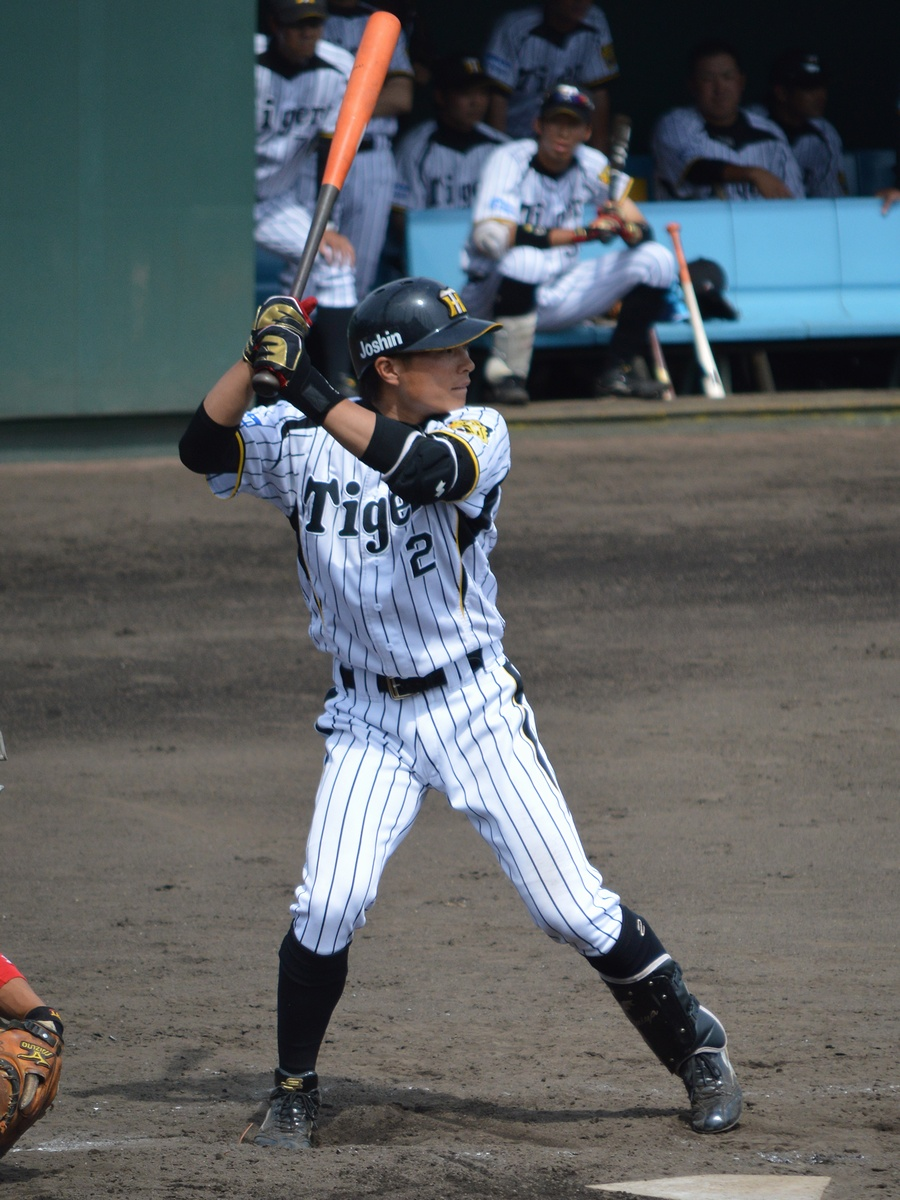
Fumiya Hojo provided a three-run home run and a game-winning triple in Game 1.

Saturday, October 5, 2019, 2:02 pm (JST) at Yokohama Stadium in Yokohama, Kanagawa Prefecture
Team	1	2	3	4	5	6	7	8	9	R	H	E
Hanshin	0	0	0	1	0	0	4	3	0	8	12	0
DeNA	3	0	0	0	4	0	0	0	0	7	14	0
WP: Rafael Dolis (1–0) LP: Edwin Escobar (0–1) Sv: Kyuji Fujikawa (1); Home runs: HAN: Fumiya Hojo (1); DEN: Yoshitomo Tsutsugo (1); Attendance: 31,832

After the Tigers didn't score against BayStars' starting pitcher Kenta Ishida in the first inning, DeNA quickly took the lead in the bottom half of the inning. After the first two batters reached base, Yoshitomo Tsutsugo hit a three-run home run off of Tiger's starter Yuki Nishi. Nishi was eventually taken out of the game that same inning after allowing five straight hits, not recording an out, and a ball hit by Toshiro Miyazaki struck him in the leg. The BayStars had another high scoring inning in the fifth when Tsutsugo hit an RBI single, followed by an RBI single by José López and a two-run hit by Tatsuhiro Shibata.

The Tigers had been held to four hits resulting in one fourth-inning RBI by Ryutaro Umeno through six innings by starters Ishida and Shota Imanaga, who made an appearance as a relief pitcher. However, they mounted a comeback starting in the seventh inning against Baystars reliever Edison Barrios when Shun Takayama hit a double and pinch hitter Seiya Kinami drove him in with a single. Barrios was then replaced with Edwin Escobar who subsequently allowed Koji Chikamoto to reach via a single. Fumiya Hojo then hit a three-run home run to bring the Tigers within two runs of the Baystars. The scoring continued for the Tigers in the top of the eight inning. Kinami hit another RBI single followed by a single by Chikamoto. With two players on base, the Baystars put in reliever Yuki Kuniyoshi. Hojo then hit a triple to give the Tigers the lead. Suguru Iwazaki pitched a scoreless eighth and veteran Kyuji Fujikawa earned the save in the ninth to secure a Tiger's win.

=== Game 2 ===
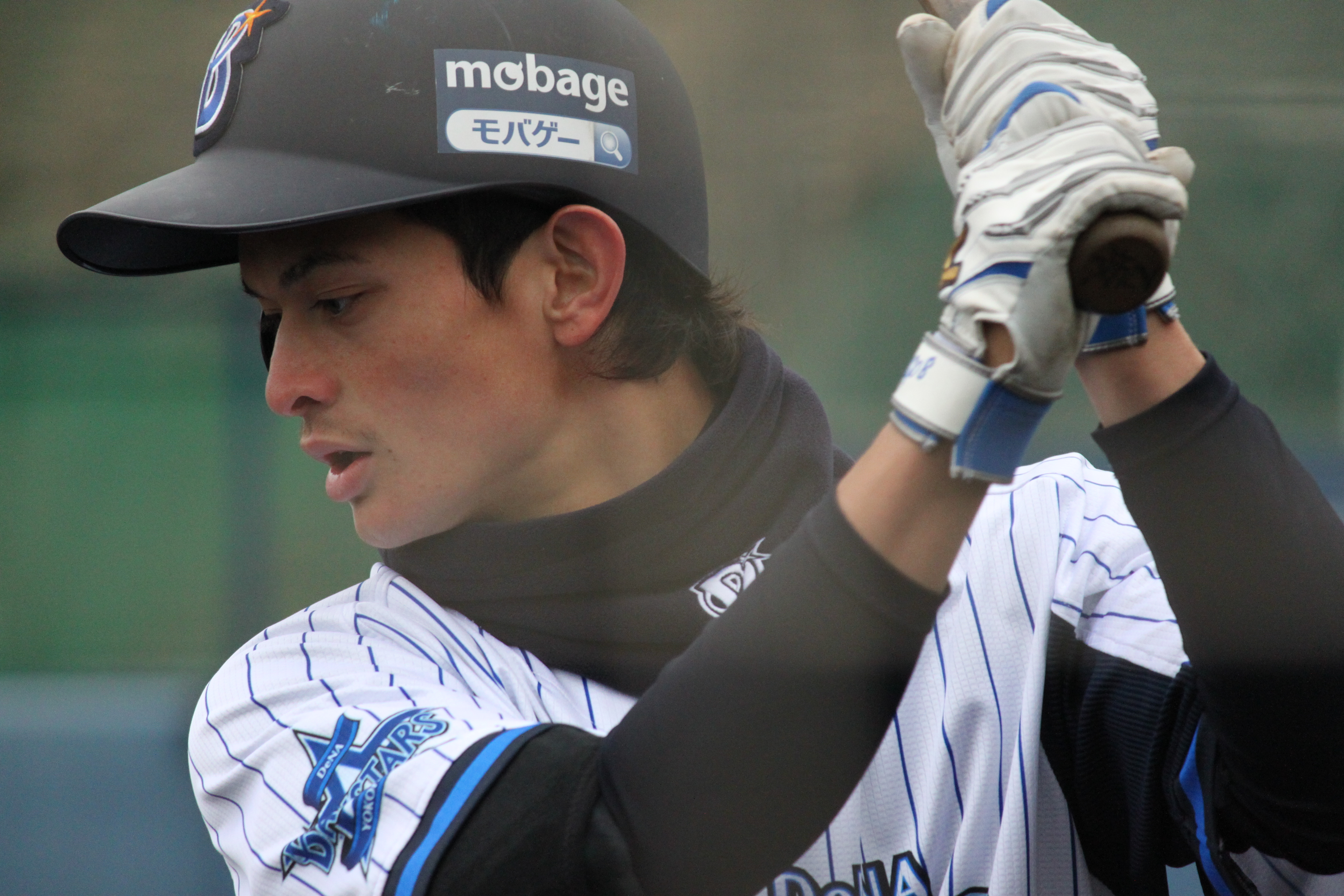
Tomo Otosaka hit a two-run sayonara home run to win Game 2.

Sunday, October 6, 2019, 2:00 pm (JST) at Yokohama Stadium in Yokohama, Kanagawa Prefecture
Team	1	2	3	4	5	6	7	8	9	R	H	E
Hanshin	0	0	0	0	2	1	0	0	1	4	10	0
DeNA	2	0	1	0	0	1	0	0	2X	6	14	1
WP: Yasuaki Yamasaki (1–0) LP: Suguru Iwazaki (0–1); Home runs: HAN: Kosuke Fukudome (1); DEN: José López (1), Yoshitomo Tsutsugo (2), Tomo Otosaka (1); Attendance: 31,818

In Game 2, the Baystars once again took the lead in the first, this time scoring two-run on a home run by López off of Tiger's starter Koyo Aoyagi. They added a run to their lead in the third inning when Tsutsugo hit a home run, his second of the series. The Tigers were able to come back and tie the game starting in the fifth inning. Hojo hit an RBI double and moved to third base on a throwing error on the same play. That DeNA error proved costly when Kosuke Fukudome singled, allowing Hojo to score. In the sixth, Kento Itohara singled, moved to second base on a sacrifice bunt, then advanced to third on a wild pitch. Hiroki Uemoto tied the game with a single to drive in Itohara. The Baystars responded in the bottom of the same inning by taking the lead on a Kazuki Kamizato RBI single. DeNA relief pitchers kept the Tigers scoreless until their closer Yasuaki Yamasaki, who also pitched in the eighth inning, blew the save in the ninth by allowing a Fukudome solo home run to tie the game. In the bottom of the ninth, Miyazaki singled off of Baystars reliever Iwazaki. Yokohama manager Alex Ramírez then put left-handed batter Tomo Otosaka in as a pinch hitter to face the left-handed Iwazaki. Otosaka hit a two-run sayonara home run to win the game.

=== Game 3 ===
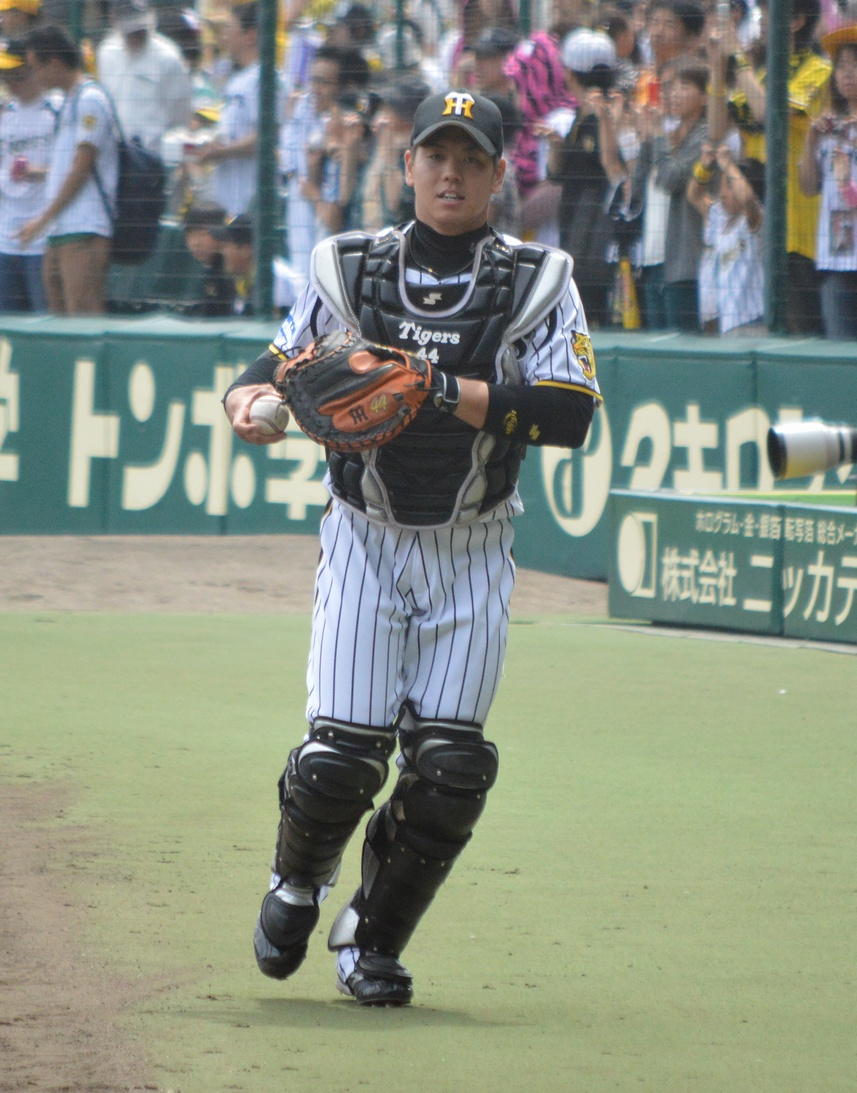
Ryutaro Umeno's sacrifice fly scored the series-winning run.

Monday, October 7, 2019, 6:01 pm (JST) at Yokohama Stadium in Yokohama, Kanagawa Prefecture
Team	1	2	3	4	5	6	7	8	9	R	H	E
Hanshin	0	0	0	0	0	1	0	1	0	2	9	1
DeNA	0	0	0	0	0	0	1	0	0	1	4	1
WP: Rafael Dolis (2–0) LP: Edwin Escobar (0–2) Sv: Kyuji Fujikawa (2); Attendance: 31,807

A light rain fell throughout Game 3, the series finale. Both the Tigers and the Baystars were scoreless through the first five innings. Hanshin plated the game's first run in the sixth inning. After Shun Takayama hit a double off of pitcher Yuki Kuniyoshi, Ryutaro Umeno laid down a bunt to move him to third base. Takayama then scored on a wild pitch from Kuniyoshi. Yokohama tied the game similarly in the seventh inning when they loaded the bases and then scored on a throwing error by third baseman Fumiya Hojo. The Tigers broke the tie in the eight inning. Edwin Escobar hit Takayama with a pitch, who was then replayed by Kai Ueda on first base. Ueda went on to steal second base then move to third on a wild pitch by Escobar. Umeno then hit a sacrifice fly to center field that allowed Ueda to score what would ultimately be the series winning run. Kyuji Fujikawa then came in to pitch two scoreless innings to close out the game and earn the save.

== Final stage ==
The Yomiuri Giants clinched the Central League pennant on September 21 and thus secured a spot as the home team in the Final Stage of the Climax Series. It was the team's 37th league title and their first since the 2014 season. This was the first season of Tatsunori Hara's third stint as the Giant's manager. Prior to this season, Hara had led the team to win seven CL pennants and three Japan Series titles. This was the first CL title in the Reiwa Era. The Giants were also the first team to win the CL title of the Heisei Era in 1989. A week before the postseason began, longtime Yomiuri catcher Shinnosuke Abe announced that he would be retiring at the end of the season after 19 years with the Giants. He is regarded to be one of the greatest catchers in NPB history. Yomiuri was 15–10 against the Hanshin Tigers during the regular season.

=== Series summary ===
Yomiuri Giants won the series, 4–1*.

Game	Date	Score	Location	Time	Attendance
1	October 9	Hanshin Tigers – 2, Yomiuri Giants – 5	Tokyo Dome	3:13	45,277
2	October 10	Hanshin Tigers – 0, Yomiuri Giants – 6	Tokyo Dome	2:43	45,168
3	October 11	Hanshin Tigers – 7, Yomiuri Giants – 6	Tokyo Dome	4:32	45,677
4	October 13^{†}	Hanshin Tigers – 1, Yomiuri Giants – 4	Tokyo Dome	2:58	45,931

* The Central League regular season champion is given a one-game advantage in the Final Stage.
† This game was originally scheduled to be played on Saturday, October 12, but was postponed one day due to Typhoon Hagibis.

=== Game 1 ===
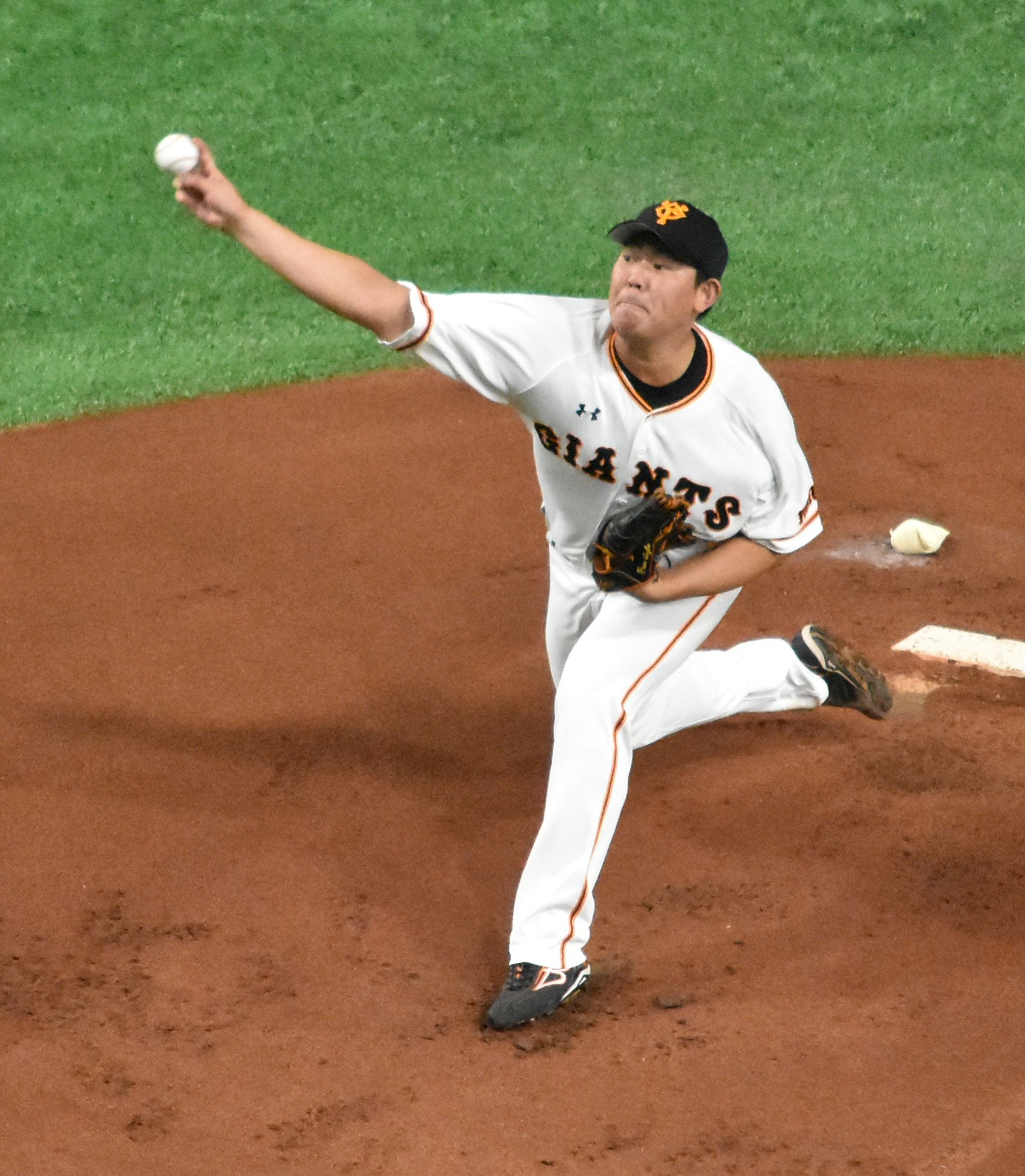
Shun Yamaguchi allowed only one run in 7 1/3 innings in the Giants' Game 1 win.

Wednesday, October 9, 2019, 6:00 pm (JST) at Tokyo Dome in Bunkyō, Tokyo
Team	1	2	3	4	5	6	7	8	9	R	H	E
Hanshin	0	0	0	1	0	0	0	0	1	2	6	0
Yomiuri	2	3	0	0	0	0	0	0	X	5	6	0
WP: Shun Yamaguchi (1–0) LP: Atsushi Mochizuki (0–1) Sv: Kazuto Taguchi (1); Home runs: HAN: None; YOM: Yoshihiro Maru (1), Kazuma Okamoto (1); Attendance: 45,277

In Game 1, the Giants scored quickly against Tigers starter Atsushi Mochizuki, who only lasted two innings. With two outs in the first inning, Yoshihiro Maru and Kazuma Okamoto hit back-to-back solo home runs to give Yomiuri a two-run lead. The scoring continued for the Giants the next inning when Yoshiyuki Kamei hit an RBI double and Hayato Sakamoto hit a two-run single. The five runs would prove to be all that was needed to win the game. Giants starting pitcher Shun Yamaguchi pitched into the eighth inning. The only run allowed by Yamaguchi came in the fourth inning. With two outs, he allowed two singles and then walked a batter. A run then scored on a wild pitch.

Hanshin attempted a comeback in the ninth inning. With one out, Giants closer Rubby De La Rosa gave up two singles to Kento Itohara and Shun Takayama. Ryutaro Umeno then drew a two-out walk to load the bases. De La Rosa walked the next batter, Fumiya Hojo, to give the Tigers another run. With the bases still loaded, reliever Kazuto Taguchi entered the game to retire the final batter, preserve the win, and record the save.

=== Game 2 ===
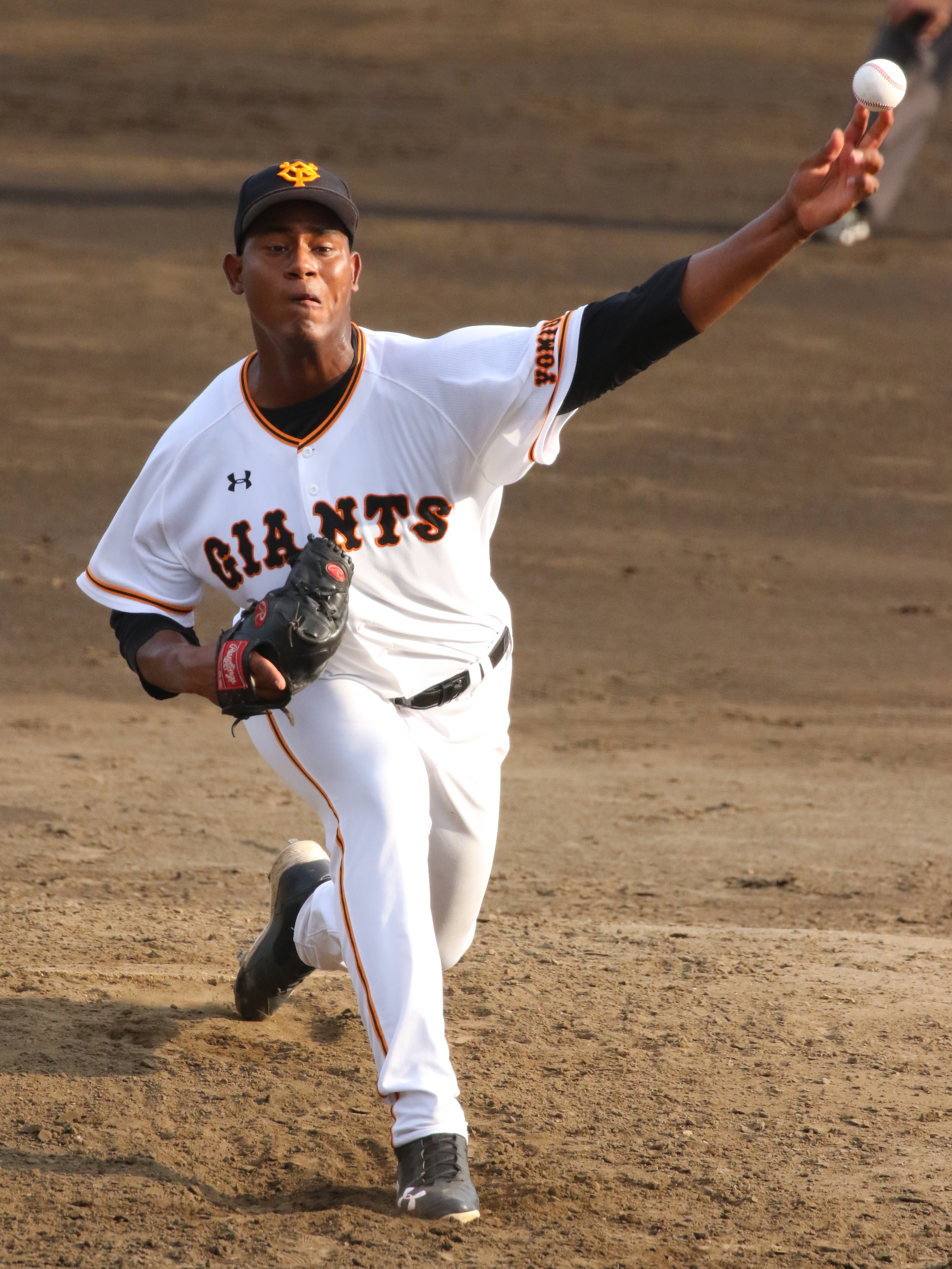
Cristopher Mercedes pitched seven innings without allowing a run in Game 2.

Thursday, October 10, 2019, 6:00 pm (JST) at Tokyo Dome in Bunkyō, Tokyo
Team	1	2	3	4	5	6	7	8	9	R	H	E
Hanshin	0	0	0	0	0	0	0	0	0	0	3	1
Yomiuri	1	0	0	2	2	0	0	1	X	6	11	1
WP: Cristopher Mercedes (1–0) LP: Haruto Takahashi (0–1); Home runs: HAN: None; YOM: Alex Guerrero (1); Attendance: 45,168

In Game 2, the starting pitchers for the Giants and the Tigers were Cristopher Mercedes and Haruto Takahashi, respectively. Yomiuri started the game's scoring early, earning a run on a double play in the first inning. Takahashi only lasted two innings before being removed from the game. Alex Guerrero added to the Giants' lead in the fourth inning with a two-run home run off of Takahashi's replacement, Onelki García. In the fifth inning, Maru drove in a run with a sacrifice fly and Okamoto hit an RBI-single, making it 5–0. Akihiro Wakabayashi closed out the scoring with a run-scoring hit in the eighth inning. For the Giants, Mercedes pitched seven innings allowing the Tigers no runs on only three hits.

=== Game 3 ===
Friday, October 11, 2019, 6:00 pm (JST) at Tokyo Dome in Bunkyō, Tokyo
Team	1	2	3	4	5	6	7	8	9	R	H	E
Hanshin	0	0	1	0	5	0	0	0	1	7	12	0
Yomiuri	0	0	3	1	2	0	0	0	0	6	9	1
WP: Kyuji Fujikawa (1–0) LP: Kota Nakagawa (0–1); Home runs: HAN: Ryutaro Umeno (1), Yusuke Oyama (1); YOM: Dai-Kang Yang (1), Kazuma Okamoto (2); Attendance: 45,677

=== Game 4 ===
Sunday, October 13, 2019, 3:30 pm (JST) at Tokyo Dome in Bunkyō, Tokyo
Team	1	2	3	4	5	6	7	8	9	R	H	E
Hanshin	0	1	0	0	0	0	0	0	0	1	2	0
Yomiuri	0	0	0	0	1	1	2	0	X	4	7	1
WP: Kan Otake (1–0) LP: Yuki Nishi (0–1) Sv: Rubby De La Rosa (1); Home runs: HAN: None; YOM: Kazuma Okamoto (3), Alex Guerrero (2); Attendance: 45,931
