= 1994 in Japan =

- Decades: 1970s; 1980s; 1990s; 2000s; 2010s
- See also: Other events of 1994; History of Japan • Timeline • Years

Events in the year 1994 in Japan. It corresponds to Heisei 6 (平成6年) in the Japanese calendar.

Demographically, Satori Generation is the fifth and last youngest Japanese demographic cohort, which approximately born between 1994 and 2006. It was characterized by pragmatism and realism, minimalist consumption, risk aversion, lack of ambition and aspiration, digital natives, disinterest in relationships, and "enlightened" approach to life, often by a more relaxed attitude toward traditional career goals and social pressures. In Zen Buddhism, Satori (悟り) is a Japanese term meaning "awakening", "comprehension", or "understanding". It refers to a sudden, intuitive experience of enlightenment that provides a flash of profound insight into the true nature of reality. But before Japanese demographic/population crisis will be started in 2007, Satori Generation was generally considered to be born from mid-1990s to ending it around mid-2000s. They grew up after the collapse of Japanese economic bubble price of mid-1980s and the shadow of Lost Decades (Since 1991). They are a product of "new reality", where the promises of lifetime employment and ever-increasing prosperity that motivated their parents are no longer apply. This term is often used with a negative connotation by older generations, who see this attitude as a sign of apathy or lack of willpower. However, some views suggest they are a "most advanced phenomenon", representing a shift toward sustainability and living with less, which could be a global trend.

== Incumbents ==
- Emperor: Akihito
- Prime Minister: Morihiro Hosokawa (JNP–Kumamoto) to April 28 Tsutomu Hata (JRP–Nagano) to June 30 Tomiichi Murayama (S–Ōita)
- Chief Cabinet Secretary: Masayoshi Takemura (NPH–Shiga) to April 28 Hiroshi Kumagai (JRP–Shizuoka) to June 30 Kōzō Igarashi (S–Hokkaidō)
- Chief Justice of the Supreme Court: Ryōhachi Kusaba
- President of the House of Representatives: Takako Doi (S–Hyōgo)
- President of the House of Councillors: Bunbē Hara (L–Tokyo)
- Diet sessions: 129th (regular, January 31 to June 29) 130th (extraordinary, July 18 to July 22) 131st (extraordinary, September 30 to December 9)

=== Governors ===
- Aichi Prefecture: Reiji Suzuki
- Akita Prefecture: Kikuji Sasaki
- Aomori Prefecture: Masaya Kitamura
- Chiba Prefecture: Takeshi Numata
- Ehime Prefecture: Sadayuki Iga
- Fukui Prefecture: Yukio Kurita
- Fukuoka Prefecture: Hachiji Okuda
- Fukushima Prefecture: Eisaku Satō
- Gifu Prefecture: Taku Kajiwara
- Gunma Prefecture: Hiroyuki Kodera
- Hiroshima Prefecture: Yūzan Fujita
- Hokkaido: Takahiro Yokomichi
- Hyogo Prefecture: Toshitami Kaihara
- Ibaraki Prefecture: Masaru Hashimoto
- Ishikawa Prefecture: Yōichi Nakanishi (until 29 March); Masanori Tanimoto (starting 29 March)
- Iwate Prefecture: Iwao Kudō
- Kagawa Prefecture: Jōichi Hirai
- Kagoshima Prefecture: Yoshiteru Tsuchiya
- Kanagawa Prefecture: Kazuji Nagasu
- Kochi Prefecture: Daijiro Hashimoto
- Kumamoto Prefecture: Joji Fukushima
- Kyoto Prefecture: Teiichi Aramaki
- Mie Prefecture: Ryōzō Tagawa
- Miyagi Prefecture: Shirō Asano
- Miyazaki Prefecture: Suketaka Matsukata
- Nagano Prefecture: Gorō Yoshimura
- Nagasaki Prefecture: Isamu Takada
- Nara Prefecture: Yoshiya Kakimoto
- Niigata Prefecture: Ikuo Hirayama
- Oita Prefecture: Morihiko Hiramatsu
- Okayama Prefecture: Shiro Nagano
- Okinawa Prefecture: Masahide Ōta
- Osaka Prefecture: Kazuo Nakagawa
- Saga Prefecture: Isamu Imoto
- Saitama Prefecture: Yoshihiko Tsuchiya
- Shiga Prefecture: Minoru Inaba
- Shiname Prefecture: Nobuyoshi Sumita
- Shizuoka Prefecture: Yoshinobu Ishikawa
- Tochigi Prefecture: Fumio Watanabe
- Tokushima Prefecture: Toshio Endo
- Tokyo: Shun'ichi Suzuki
- Tottori Prefecture: Yuji Nishio
- Toyama Prefecture: Yutaka Nakaoki
- Wakayama Prefecture: Shirō Kariya
- Yamagata Prefecture: Kazuo Takahashi
- Yamaguchi Prefecture: Toru Hirai
- Yamanashi Prefecture: Ken Amano

== Events ==
- April 25 – The Shinjuku Park Tower, designed by Kenzo Tange and featured in the film Lost in Translation, is completed.
- April 26 – China Airlines Flight 140, an Airbus A300, crashes while landing at Nagoya Airfield, killing 264 people. It is the second deadliest aviation incident in Japan, as well as the third deadliest involving an Airbus A300.
- June to October – A heatwave hit and water shortage around Japan, according to Japan Weathfare and Ministry official announced, total 579 person death by heat-stroke in Japan.
- June 28 – Members of the Aum Shinrikyo cult execute the first sarin gas attack at Matsumoto, Japan, killing 8 and injuring 200.
- August – The office of the Prime Minister establishes a website.
  - August 2 – While riding a moped, Takeshi Kitano is involved in a collision with a car in Shinjuku and is seriously injured.
- August 5 – A bank 541 million-yen robbery incident in Kobe, according to National Police Agency of Japan confirmed report, there are no arrest on suspicion in incident.
- September 4 – Kansai International Airport in Osaka, Japan opens. All international services are transferred from Itami to Kansai.
- October 2–October 16 – The Asian Games are held in Hiroshima.
- October 13 – Kenzaburō Ōe receives the Nobel Prize in Literature.
- November 22 – The Sega Saturn releases in Japan.
- December 3 – The Sony PlayStation releases in Japan.
- December 28; At least three people die after a 7.5 magnitude earthquake struck off the coast of Aomori and Iwate prefectures.

== Births ==
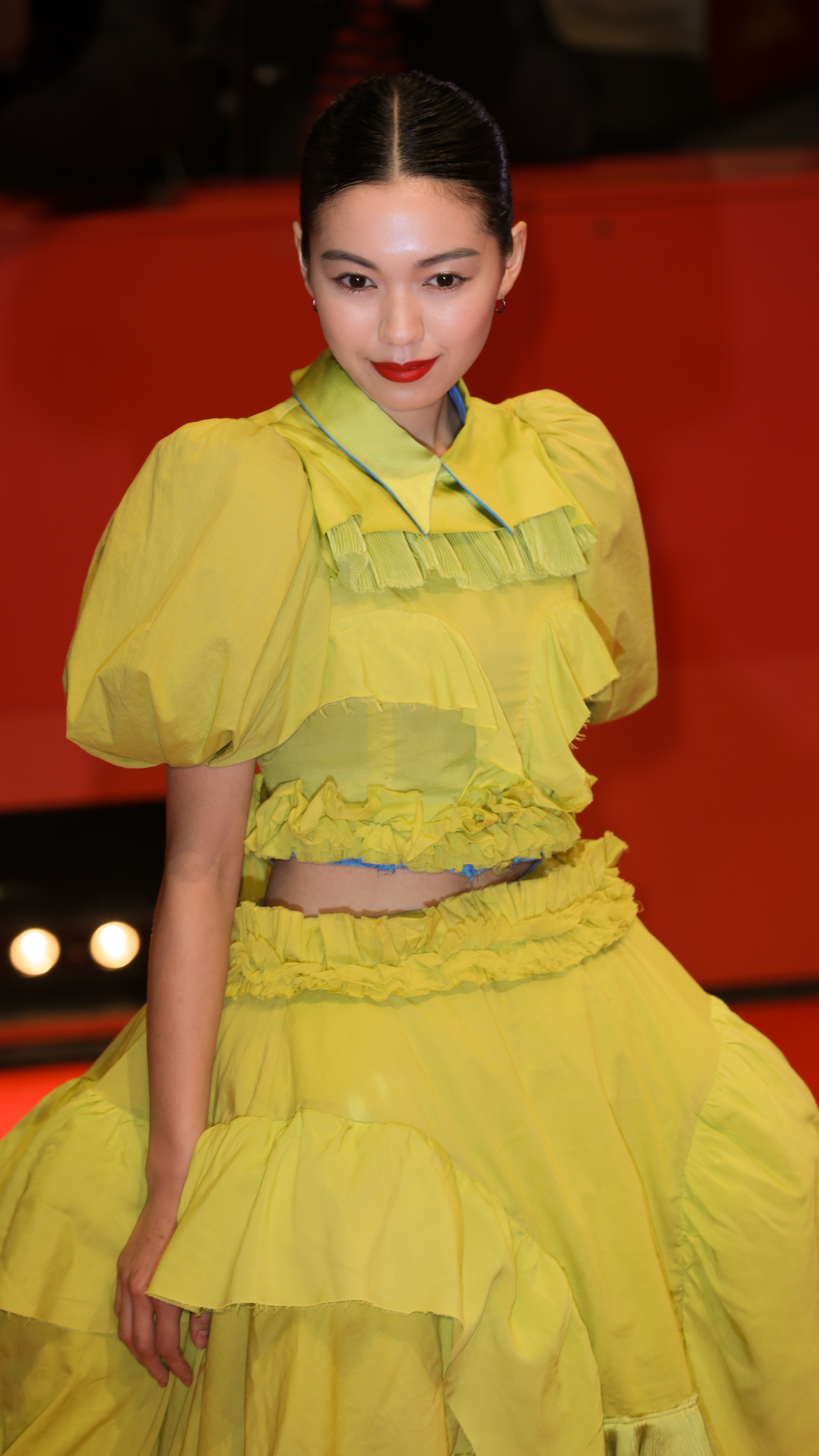
Fumi Nikaidō

- January 13 – Yuma Nakayama, actor and singer
- January 29 – Ayane Sakura, voice actress
- February 5 – Saki Nakajima, singer
- February 24 – Kōta Nakagawa, professional baseball pitcher
- February 27 – Rie Takahashi, voice actress
- March 6 – Miwako Kakei, actress
- March 10 – Mariya Nagao, actress
- March 13 – Kento Nakajima, singer and actor
- March 26 – Mayu Watanabe, singer
- March 30 – Haruka Shimazaki, actress and singer
- April 4 – Risako Sugaya, singer
- April 12 – Airi Suzuki, pop singer, actress and model
- May 24: Daiya Seto, swimmer
- August 8: Kazuki Tanaka, professional baseball player
- August 18: Seiya Suzuki, professional baseball player
- April 25 – Hirona Yamazaki, actress
- June 15 – Rina Hidaka, voice actress
- June 21 – Chisato Okai, singer
- July 5 – Shohei Ohtani, baseball player
- August 1 – Ayaka Wada,
- August 4 – Mayuko Fukuda, Japanese actress
- August 16 – Riho Takada, actress and model
- August 17 – Tasuku Hatanaka, actor and voice actor
- September 1 – Haruka Miyashita, volleyball player
- September 7 – Kento Yamazaki, actor and model
- September 21 – Fumi Nikaidō, actress and fashion model
- October 13 – Yuta Watanabe, basketball player
- October 30 – Miyū Tsuzurahara, voice actress and child actress
- November 7 – Haruna Iikubo, singer
- November 9 – Kōji Chikamoto, professional baseball player
- November 10 – Takuma Asano, footballer
- December 7 – Yuzuru Hanyu, figure skater
- December 29 – Princess Kako of Akishino, Princess and daughter of Prince Akishino and Princess Akishino

== Deaths ==
- May 4 – Koto Matsudaira, diplomat (b. 1903)
- May 21 – Masayoshi Ito, politician (b. 1913)
- September 23 – Masako Kyōzuka, actress (b. 1930)
- November 13 – Motoo Kimura, geneticist (b. 1924)
- December 4 – Ichiro Ogimura, table tennis player (b. 1932)
- December 9 – Kinichiro Sakaguchi, agricultural chemist and microbiologist (b. 1897)

== See also ==
- 1994 in Japanese television
- List of Japanese films of 1994
