= List of Japanese films of 1994 =

A list of films released in Japan in 1994 (see 1994 in film).

Title	Director	Cast	Genre	Notes
1994
Angel Dust	Sogo Ishii			
Crayon Shin-chan: Treasure of Buri Buri Kingdom			Anime	
Crest of Betrayal	Kinji Fukasaku	Kōichi Satō		Japan Academy Prize for Best Film
Dragon Ball Z: Broly Second Coming			Anime	
Dragon Ball Z: Bio-Broly	Yoshihiro Ueda		Anime	
The Dream of Garuda	Takahisa Zeze	Takeshi Itō, Saki Kurihara, Shirō Shimomoto	Erotic	
Fatal Fury: The Motion Picture	Masami Ōbari	Kazukiyo Nishikiori, Keiichi Nanba, Nobuyuki Hiyama, Kotono Mitsuishi, Tomo Sakurai, Shin-ichiro Miki, Yō Inoue, Shō Hayami, Kenji Utsumi	Anime	
Godzilla vs. SpaceGodzilla	Kensho Yamashita		Kaiju	
I Like You, I Like You Very Much	Hiroyuki Oki	Chano	Pink (gay)	Winner of Silver Prize and Best New Director at the Pink Grand Prix
Kakuranger Movie				
Kamen Rider J			Tokusatsu	
Kamen Rider World			Tokusatsu	
Keep on Masturbating: Non-Stop Pleasure	Toshiya Ueno	Takeshi Itō; Hitomi Aikawa	Pink	Winner of the Pink Grand Prix for Best Film, Screenplay and Actor
Leo the Lion	Toshiyuki Hiruma		Animated	
Ohan	Kon Ichikawa	Sayuri Yoshinaga		
Sailor Moon S: The Movie	Hiroki Shibata		Anime	
Slam Dunk			Anime	
Slam Dunk: Conquer the Nation, Hanamichi Sakuragi!			Anime	
Station to Heaven	Masanobu Deme	Sayuri Yoshinaga		
Super Sentai World				
The Man Who Shot the Don				
Tora-san's Easy Advice	Yoji Yamada	Kiyoshi Atsumi	Comedy	47th in the Otoko wa Tsurai yo series
Yamato Takeru	Takao Okawara	Masahiro Takashima, Yasuko Sawaguchi	Fantasy	
YuYu Hakusho: Bonds of Fire	Masakatsu Iijima		Anime	

== See also ==
- 1994 in Japan
- 1994 in Japanese television
