= Otosaka =

Otosaka (written: 乙坂) is a Japanese surname. Notable people with the surname include:

- Tomo Otosaka (乙坂 智, born 1994), Japanese baseball player

== Fictional characters ==
- Yuu Otosaka (乙坂 有宇), protagonist of the anime series Charlotte
