= Kin'ichirō =

Kin'ichirō, Kinichiro or Kinichirou (written: 欽一郎 or 謹一郎) is a masculine Japanese given name. Notable people with the name include:

- Kinichiro Ishikawa (1871–1945), Japanese painter
- Kinichiro Sakaguchi (1897–1994), Japanese agricultural chemist and microbiologist
