= 1994 in Japanese television =

Events in 1994 in Japanese television.

== Debuts ==
| Show | Station | Premiere Date | Genre | Original Run |
|---|---|---|---|---|
| Blue Seed | TV Tokyo | October 5 | anime | October 5, 1994 - March 29, 1995 |
| Blue SWAT | TV Asahi | January 30 | tokusatsu | January 30, 1994 – January 27, 1995 |
| Brave Police J-Decker | Nagoya TV | February 5th | anime | February 5, 1994 – January 28, 1995 |
| Captain Tsubasa J | TV Tokyo | October 21 | anime | October 21, 1994 - December 22, 1995 |
| Chou Kuse ni Narisou | NHK | April 5 | anime | April 5, 1994 - March 28, 1995 |
| Ginga Sengoku Gun'yuuden Rai | TV Tokyo | April 8 | anime | April 8, 1994 – March 31, 1995 |
| Haou Taikei Ryuu Knight | TV Tokyo | April 5 | anime | April 5, 1994 – March 28, 1995 |
| Macross 7 | MBS | October 16th | anime | October 16, 1994 – September 24, 1995 |
| Montana Jones | NHK | April 2 | anime | April 2, 1994 – April 8, 1995 |
| Ninja Sentai Kakuranger | TV Asahi | February 18 | tokusatsu | February 18, 1994 – February 24, 1995 |
| Pig Girl of Love and Courage: Tonde Burin | MBS | September 3 | anime | September 3, 1994 - August 26, 1995 |
| Sailor Moon S | TV Asahi | March 19 | anime | March 19, 1994 - February 25, 1995 |
| Shirayuki Hime no Densetsu | NHK | April 6 | anime | April 6, 1994 - March 29, 1995 |
| Tama of Third Street: Do You Know My Tama? | MBS | April 3 | anime | April 3, 1994 – September 25, 1994 |
| Tottemo! Luckyman | TV Tokyo | April 6 | anime | April 6, 1994 - March 23, 1995 |

== Ongoing shows ==
- Music Fair, music (1964–present)
- Mito Koumon, jidaigeki (1969-2011)
- Sazae-san, anime (1969–present)
- Ouoka Echizen, jidaigeki (1970-1999)
- FNS Music Festival, music (1974–present)
- Panel Quiz Attack 25, game show (1975–present)
- Doraemon, anime (1979-2005)
- Kiteretsu Daihyakka, anime (1988-1996)
- Soreike! Anpanman, anime (1988–present)
- Dragon Ball Z, anime (1989–1996)
- Downtown no Gaki no Tsukai ya Arahende!!, game show (1989–present)
- Cooking Papa, anime (1992-1995)
- YuYu Hakusho, anime (1992-1995)
- Crayon Shin-chan, anime (1992–present)
- Iron Chef, game show (1993-1999)
- Shima Shima Tora no Shimajirou, anime (1993-2008)
- Nintama Rantarou, anime (1993–present)
- Sailor Moon, anime (1992-1997)

== Endings ==
| Show | Station | Ending Date | Genre | Original Run |
|---|---|---|---|---|
| The Brave Express Might Gaine | Nagoya TV | January 22 | anime | January 30, 1993 – January 22, 1994 |
| Gridman the Hyper Agent | TBS | January 8 | tokusatsu | April 3, 1993 – January 8, 1994 |
| Ghost Sweeper Mikami | TV Asahi | March 6 | anime | April 11, 1993 – March 6, 1994 |
| Gosei Sentai Dairanger | TV Asahi | February 11 | tokusatsu | February 19, 1993 – February 11, 1994 |
| Sailor Moon R | TV Asahi | March 12 | anime | March 6, 1993 - March 12, 1994 |
| Shippū! Iron Leaguer | TV Tokyo | March 25 | anime | April 6, 1993 - March 25, 1994 |
| Tama of Third Street: Do You Know My Tama? | MBS | September 25 | anime | April 3, 1994 – September 25, 1994 |
| Tokusou Robo Janperson | TV Asahi | January 23 | tokusatsu | January 31, 1993 – January 23, 1994 |
| Kenyū Densetsu Yaiba | TV Tokyo | April 1 | anime | April 9, 1993 – April 1, 1994 |

== See also ==
- 1994 in anime
- List of Japanese television dramas
- 1994 in Japan
- List of Japanese films of 1994
