= Ryutaro Umeno =

Japanese baseball player (born 1991)

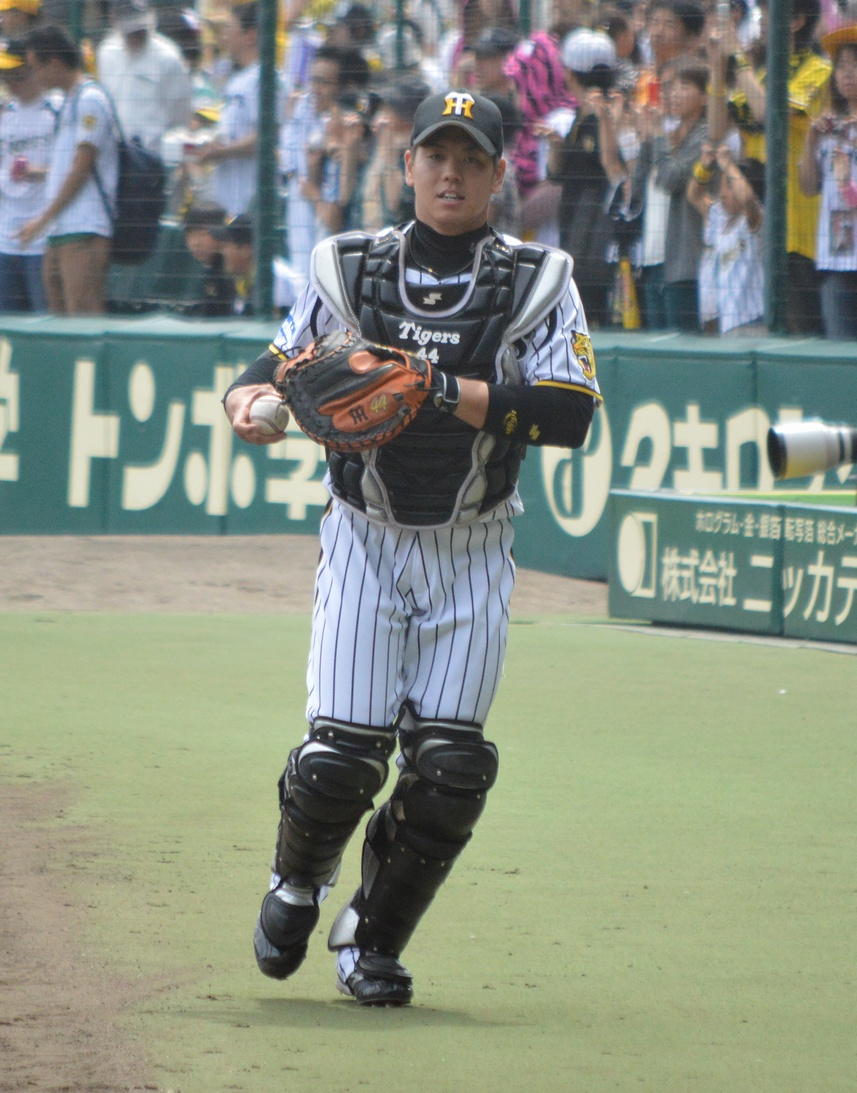
- Umeno with the Hanshin Tigers

Hanshin Tigers – No. 2
- Catcher
- Born: June 17, 1991 (age 35); Fukuoka, Japan
- Bats: Right Throws: Right

NPB debut
- March 28, 2014, for the Hanshin Tigers

NPB statistics (through 2025 season)
- Batting average: .229
- Home runs: 45
- RBI: 305
- Stats at Baseball Reference

Teams
- Hanshin Tigers (2014–present)

Career highlights and awards
- 4× NPB All-Star (2017, 2019, 2021, 2023); 3× Central League Golden Glove Award (2018, 2019, 2020)
Medals
Men's baseball
Representing Japan
Summer Olympics
Gold medal – first place	2020 Tokyo	Team

Ryutaro Umeno (梅野 隆太郎, Umeno Ryūtarō; born June 17, 1991 in Fukuoka, Japan) is a Japanese professional baseball catcher for the Hanshin Tigers of Nippon Professional Baseball (NPB). Since joining the Tigers, he was given the nickname "Ume-chan". His throw is referred to by commentators as the 'Ume-chan Bazooka' due to its accuracy and power.

== Early baseball career ==
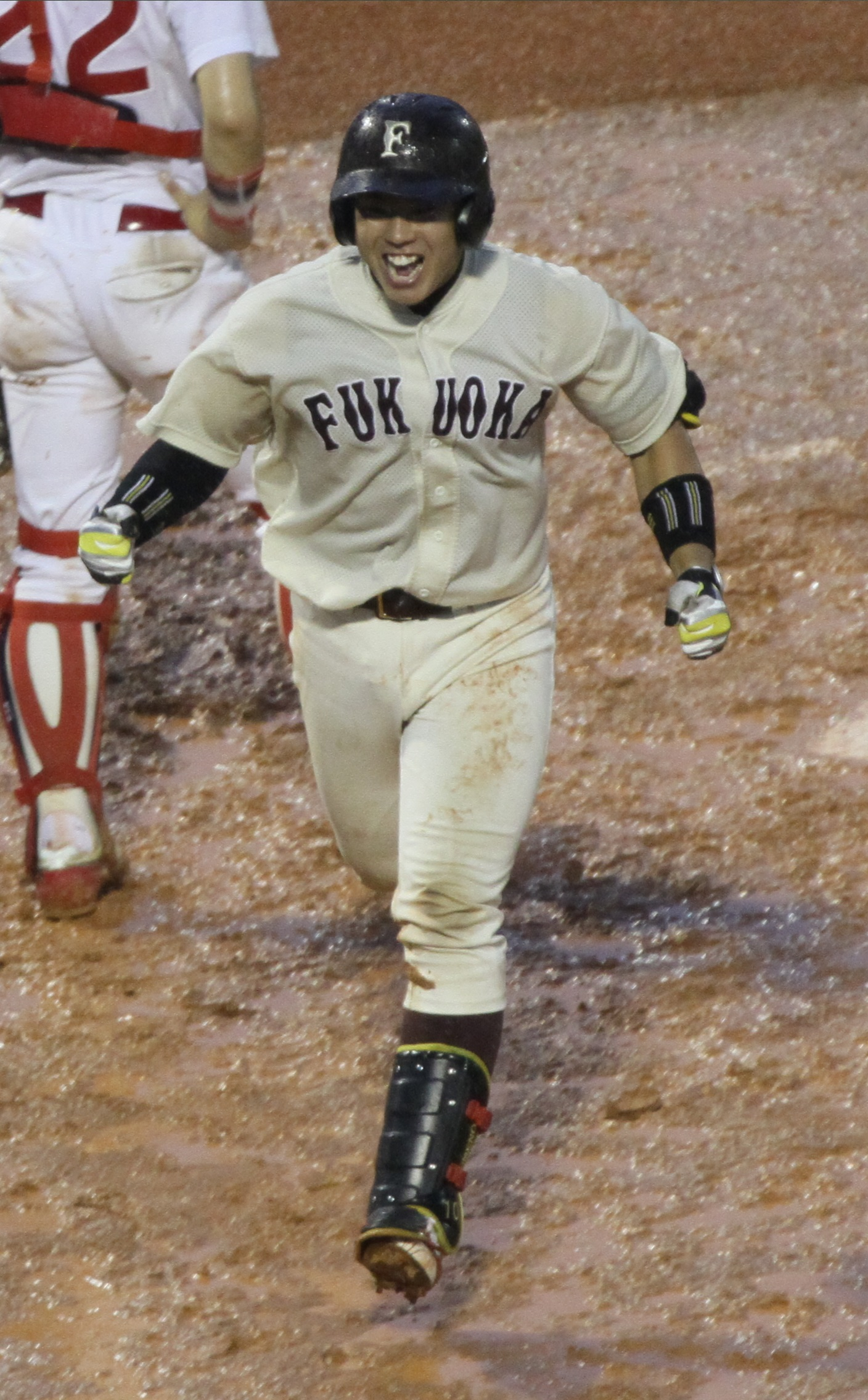
Meiji Jingu Stadium 2013

Born in Nakagawa-cho, Fukuoka Prefecture, Umeno started playing baseball when he was in 2nd grade, mainly due to the influence of his father who was coaching the town's little league team. He originally played as an outfielder, but changed his position to catcher when he was in 4th grade.

In middle school his team, the Nakagawa Sharks, regularly participated in the Japan Baseball League. From 2005 to 2006, he led his team to 2 consecutive overall championships as the main catcher and 4th batter.

After middle school, Umeno entered Fukuoka Koudai Joto High School on a baseball scholarship program. There he played as an outfielder until the summer of his sophomore year. That year he was elected team captain and returned to the catcher position. He was a year ahead of Masahiro Nakatani, another Hanshin player drafted straight from high school, and who also converted from an outfielder to a catcher. He hit a total of 24 home runs in high school.

Umeno was supposed to be included in the 2009 amateur draft but, thinking he might not yet be able to handle the strain from professional matches, he decided to attend Fukuoka University instead. His team regularly competed in the Kyushu University Baseball League, and made it to the finals for four consecutive seasons. In his league appearances, he hit a total of 28 home runs, and recorded a batting average of .300. In addition, he was selected as captain of Japan's team to the 2013 USA College Baseball Championships, where Japan won the series 3–2.

In November 2013, his team defeated Nippon Bunri Daigaku in the Kyushu University Baseball League championships. With this, their team represented the Kyushu region in the 44th Meiji Jingu Baseball Tournament. Unfortunately, they were eliminated in the first round (November 16), despite Umeno delivering three hits and a solo homer.

== Hanshin Tigers ==
Umeno was Hanshin's 4th pick in the 2013 Nippon Professional Baseball draft. He was assigned the jersey no. 44, previously worn by famous Hanshin sluggers Randy Bass and Cecil Fielder.

2014

With notable performances during pre-season exhibition games and a lack of reliable catchers in the roster, Manager Wada added Umeno to the roster despite his rookie status. He debuted as a pinch hitter in the March 28 season opener with the Yomiuri Giants in Tokyo Dome, and remained as a catcher until the end of the game. Two days after, in the same card, he scored his first hit, again as a pinch hitter in the 6th. The previous Tiger rookie catcher to score during the season's opening card was Kōichi Tabuchi, 45 years prior in 1969.

Umeno first appeared as a starter in an April 20 match with the Swallows, the first time that a Hanshin rookie catcher did so since Ryo Asai 12 years prior. A week later, he hit his first professional home run in the 9th during the match against the BayStars. He is the third rookie catcher to do so in Hanshin history, the first being Kōichi Tabuchi, followed by Shimada Munehiko in 1985. He is the second rookie catcher to hit a home run as a pinch hitter, following Hiroshi Yagi in 1987.

In the May 6 game with the Dragons, with both teams tied at the 12th, no outs and a runner at 1st, he was tasked once again to pinch hit, hitting a tie-breaking 2-run homerun.

From June onwards, Umeno's starts gradually increased, mostly as a catcher for Randy Messenger. He again made Hanshin history on July 1 when he hit 2 consecutive home runs, the 3rd rookie to do so since Akinobu Okada in 1980, and just the 2nd catcher since Tabuchi in 1969.

The strain from his continued appearances finally caught up with Umeno however, making him lose considerable weight (10 kilos) and causing a slump towards the end of the season. However, despite only playing 92 games, he recorded 49 hits, 21 RBIs, and 7 home runs - at least twice that of any Hanshin catcher's home run record for the previous season. Defense-wise, he boasted a 99.5 fielding percentage and he was the only catcher in both leagues to never be charged with a passed ball, a feat never before accomplished in the past 35 years of the NPB.

Though he didn't get any playing time during the off-season Climax Series, Umeno was tasked to pinch hit in the 2nd leg of the Japan Series against the Fukuoka Hawks. In November, he also joined the Hanshin-Yomiuri team in a friendly practice game against the US, in preparation for the 2014 Suzuki All-Star Series.

He received a 9.6 million salary raise on November 21, bringing his annual salary to approximately 18 million for the 2015 season.

2015

This was his first season Umeno started from the season opener in March, and he continued to be the team's main catcher for 13 more games until being taken off the roster due to a slump. He continued to play in the Western League (farm) games, and on May 31, he together with Fumiya Hojo and Taiga Egoshi notched a historic 3 consecutive home-run feat that was last accomplished in the farm 35 years before. He managed to get back to the main squad in August, but given the competition with veteran catchers Fujii and Tsuruoka, he got hardly any play time during the remainder of the season. In 56 game appearances, he batted an average of 0.239, with 18 RBIs including 4 home runs.

He was tasked to catch during the first stage of the post-season Climax Series, but the Tigers did not advance to the final stage despite him contributing 3 hits and 1 run. Because his performance for the regular season was below par, he received a 3 million yen pay cut during the November salary negotiations.

2016

Fujii retired at the end of 2015, but with the breakthrough performance of Ikusei-turned-main squad catcher Fumihito Haraguchi, and the entry of another newly drafted catcher Seishirō Sakamoto, Umeno was faced with more competition and his appearances became even more limited. He finished with a personal low of 12 hits and 4 RBIs out of 37 games for the entire season.

2017

With Haraguchi being groomed more towards first base and Sakamoto suffering from an injury, Umeno finally became the team's main catcher for majority of the season's games. In the May 6 match with the Carps, he batted in 3 runs and played a big part in biggest come-from-behind win in team history where the Tigers made up for a 9-run deficit in just 2 innings. He continued to produce hits until mid-season, which led to his being voted as the main catcher in his first All-Star game. However, with Sakamoto fully recovered in July, the two catchers were again alternated. Umeno fell into a slump in August, and his starts gradually diminished finishing the season with only a 0.206 batting average. He got elected as the chief player representative for the 2018 season in November.

2018

Umeno managed to firmly secure the team's main catcher role and appeared in most of the team's games. Despite having a rocky start early in the season (.217 average until June), his hitting picked up in July and by August, he batted 0.338 and racked up 10 RBIs with 4 home runs in 23 games. This earned him the team's MVP of the month award. He was mostly assigned to bat 5th or 6th, and finished the season with a 0.724 OPS, 0.259 average, 100 hits, 47 RBI with 8 home runs in 132 games. He finished second in the league in caught stealing percentage (32%) and was awarded the Mitsui Golden Glove Award for his fielding, making him the 3rd home-grown Hanshin catcher to do so, and the first one to win the award despite the team ranking last. His improved performance earned him a 24 million pay raise, almost doubling his previous salary to 50 million yen.

2019

Despite breaking a toe while baserunning on April 2, Umeno notched his 1st home run and 1st career cycle hit (3B-1B-HR-2B) on April 9 which contributed to the team's come-from-behind win against the Baystars. He consistently delivered in his next outings, and by June he topped the league in catcher caught stealing assists (16). As a result, he was voted by both the fans and fellow NPB players into his 2nd All-star game, becoming the first ever Hanshin catcher to do so. He and Haraguchi hit back-to-back home runs in Game 2 of the series. In the later half of the season however, his performance at the plate went south and he eventually got alternated with catchers Sakamoto and Haraguchi. What he lacked in offense, he made up for in defense and in base stealing where he managed to record 10 successful attempts by August 17 (a feat last accomplished by a Hanshin catcher Keisuke Kanoh in 2009). On September 24, he broke the NPB record for catcher assists when he notched his 120th (he finished the season with 123 assists). He finished the season with 14 stolen bases, 115 hits, 59 RBIs including 9 home runs, and 0.266 average for 129 games. He not only contributed to the team's advance to the post-season playoffs, he also got awarded the Golden Glove award for the 2nd year straight, a feat last accomplished by a Hanshin catcher in 1974. He was given a massive pay raise post-season which doubled his previous salary to 100 million yen, becoming only the 3rd catcher in Tigers history to be paid a 9-digit annual salary (after Akihiro Yano and Kenji Johjima), and the only homegrown catcher to do so.

2020

Umeno had fewer appearances for 2020 as he was once more alternated with catchers Haraguchi and Sakamoto, with the latter getting assigned in most of Haruto Takahashi's starts. On top of that, he injured his right shoulder on September 18 and was taken off the roster for two weeks. Offense-wise, his performance was at par with 2019 as he finished with 29 RBIs, 5 stolen bases, 0.262 batting average and 0.389 slugging percentage in 98 games. Defense-wise, he notched a 99.6% fielding percentage and once more topped the league in assists (68) and putouts (627). This earned him his third Golden Glove award, and he became the 1st Central League catcher in 19 years to win the award 3 years in a row, following Swallows catcher and NPB Hall of Famer Atsuya Furuta in 2001. Post-season, he was assigned jersey #2, and was given a 10 million yen pay raise, bringing his annual salary to 110 million yen.

== Playing style ==
Umeno's right arm throw to 2nd base was clocked at 1.93 seconds, and he can throw as far as 115 meters. Hanshin import Randy Messenger, who teamed up with Umeno in most of his starts, praised the rookie's ability to catch even his most difficult pitches.

== Personal trivia ==
When Umeno was in 4th grade, his 34-year-old mother died of cancer. In her last two remaining months, her last request to her husband was "Please help Ryutaro become a professional baseball player". His father raised both him and his younger brother singlehandedly, while running his interior design business. When Umeno made it to the 2013 draft, he thanked his mother during the TBS live conference on October 24. He offered the commemorative ball of his first professional hit on his mother's grave.
