= Comprehension =

Comprehension may refer to:

- Comprehension (logic), the totality of intensions, that is, properties or qualities, that an object possesses
- Comprehension approach, several methodologies of language learning that emphasize understanding language rather than speaking
- Comprehension axiom, an axiom in Zermelo–Fraenkel set theory in mathematics
- List comprehension, an adaptation of mathematical set notation to represent lists in computer science
- Reading comprehension, a measurement of the understanding of a passage of text
- Understanding, ability to think about and to deal adequately with an idea

== See also ==
- Comprehensive (disambiguation)
