= Hiroyuki Oki =

Japanese filmmaker (1964–2025)

Hiroyuki Oki (Japanese: 大木裕之; 1964 – October 14, 2025) was a Japanese film director.

== Career ==
Oki was born in 1964, in Higashimurayama, Tokyo. He began making films while still in college and had exhibited his works at numerous international film festivals.

He produced a number of feature films throughout his career, including I Like You, I Like You Very Much (1994), Tama Play (1996) and G8 (2002).

On October 14, 2025, Oki died after collapsing, he had been suffering with stomach cancer.
