= Comprehensive =

Comprehensive may refer to:

- Comprehensive layout, the page layout of a proposed design as initially presented by the designer to a client.
- Comprehensive school, a state school that does not select its intake on the basis of academic achievement or aptitude.
- Comprehensive examination, an exam taken in some countries by graduates.
