= Atsushi Mochizuki =

Japanese baseball player (born 1997)

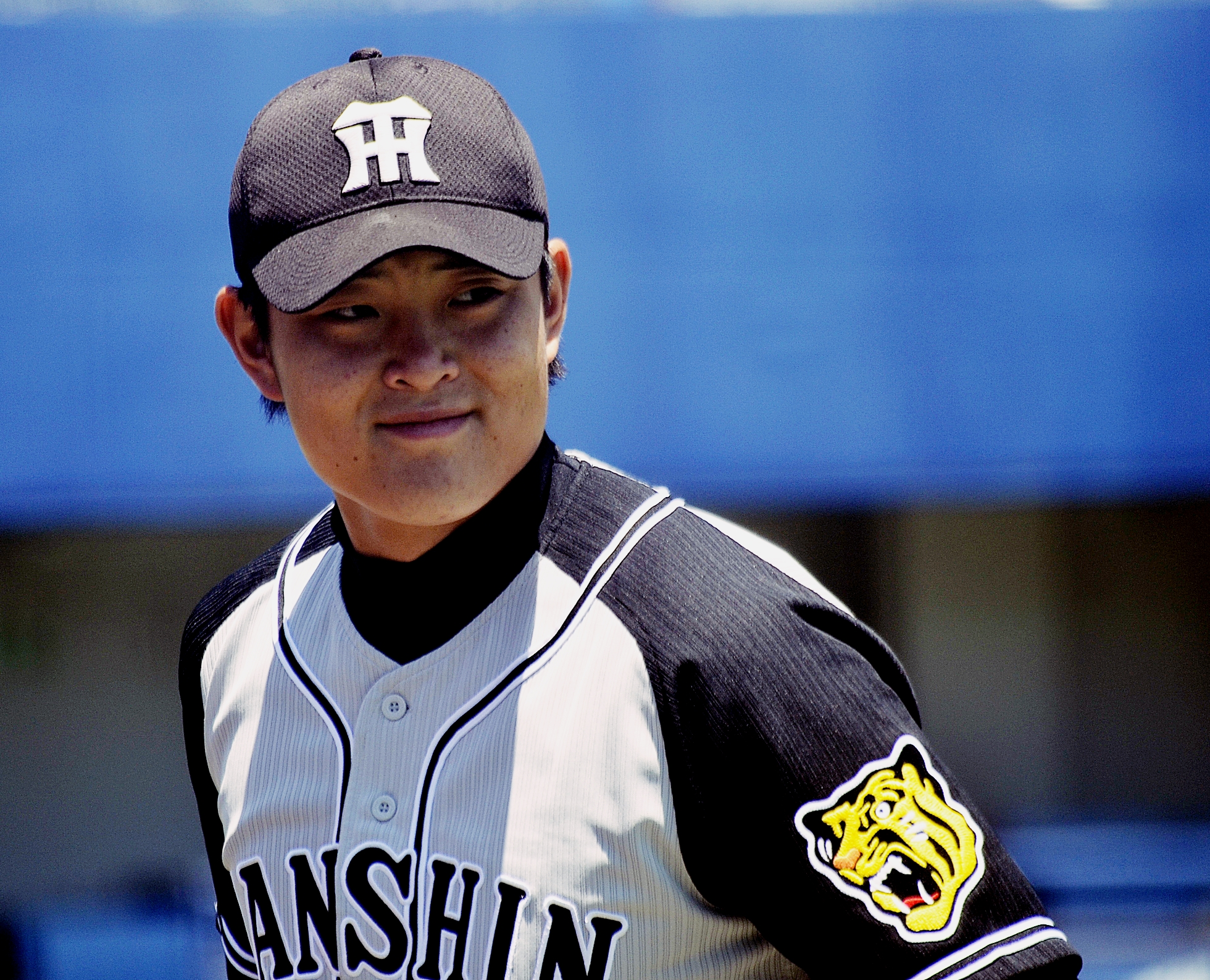
- Mochizuki with the Hanshin Tigers

Hanshin Tigers – No. 124
- Pitcher
- Born: August 2, 1997 (age 28); Yokohama, Kanagawa
- Bats: Right Throws: Right

debut
- October 1, 2016, for the Hanshin Tigers

NPB statistics (through 2020 season)
- Win–loss: 1-1
- Earned run average: 4.34
- Strikeout: 85
- Stats at Baseball Reference

Teams
- Hanshin Tigers (2015 – )

Atsushi Mochizuki (望月 惇志, Mochizuki Atsushi; born August 2, 1997) is a Japanese Nippon Professional Baseball pitcher for the Hanshin Tigers in Japan's Central League.

== Early baseball career ==
Born in Yokohama, Atsushi started playing ball at the young age of 5, and played little league with the Higashi Serigaya Junior Phoenix. He also played various positions when he entered Serigaya Junior High. In his senior year at Yokohama Sogakugan High School, he recorded a maximum pitch velocity of 148 km/h, but his school never made it to either Spring Koshien or Summer Koshien.

== Hanshin Tigers ==
He was chosen as the Hanshin Tigers' 4th pick in the 2015 Nippon Professional Baseball draft. He signed a 40 million yen contract with the Tigers, with an estimated 5 million yen annual salary. He was assigned the jersey number 61.

2016

He spent his first season mostly in the farm and remained in the dugout until June. His first start came on June 9 against the Orix Buffaloes farm team, where he pitched 5 scoreless innings to earn the win. He got 13 more starts after that, and finished the Western League season with a 5–3 record with 1 complete game, and a 3.84 ERA. He was finally given the chance to debut in the main squad in the Giants match on October 1 where he pitched a scoreless 9th inning to help secure Hanshin's shutout victory. Due to overexertion however, he sustained an injury on his right elbow during post-season training which prompted the coaches to stop him from pitching for a while.

2017

Despite improvement in his pitching velocity (155 km/h at that time), he experienced lower back pain in April that needed long-term rehabilitation. He made full recovery by August, but never got the chance to participate in any main squad games. He finished 5–3 with a 3.84 ERA in 14 starts in the farm. He again experienced lower back pain due to a herniated disc and underwent surgery in December.

== Playing Style ==
Standing at 190 cm, Mochizuki is a right-handed pitcher who can throw fastballs clocked at a maximum of 158 km/h, mixed with sliders and splitters.
