= Fumiya Hojo =

Japanese baseball player (born 1994)

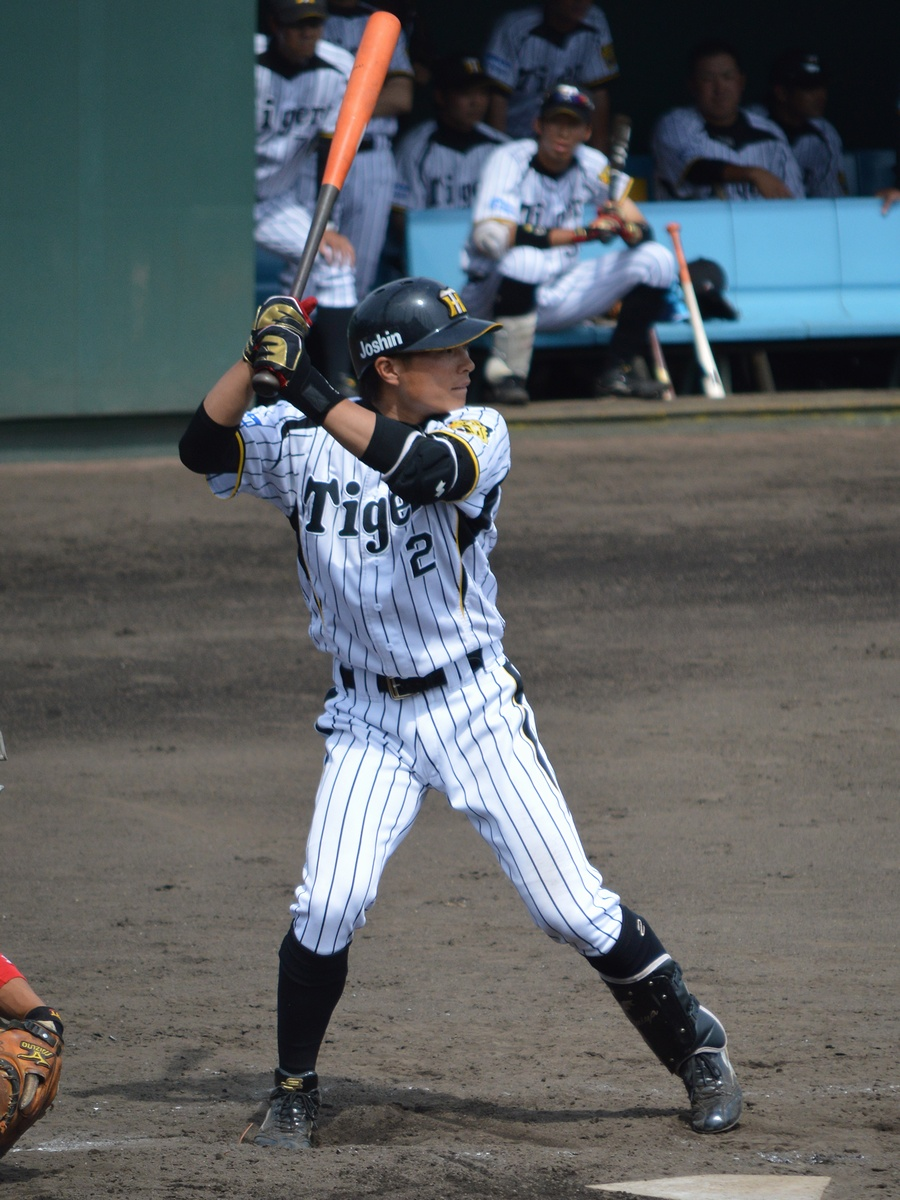
- Hojo with the Hanshin Tigers

Hanshin Tigers – No. 26
- Infielder
- Born: July 29, 1994 (age 31)
- Bats: Right Throws: Right

NPB debut
- May 28, 2015, for the Hanshin Tigers

NPB statistics (through 2020 season)
- Batting average: .260
- Home runs: 16
- Hits: 290
- RBI: 100
- Stolen bases: 11
- Stats at Baseball Reference

Teams
- Hanshin Tigers (2013–present)

Fumiya Hojo (北條 史也, Hōjō Fumiya; born July 29, 1994) is a Japanese professional baseball infielder, playing for the Hanshin Tigers in Japan's Nippon Professional Baseball.

== Early baseball career ==
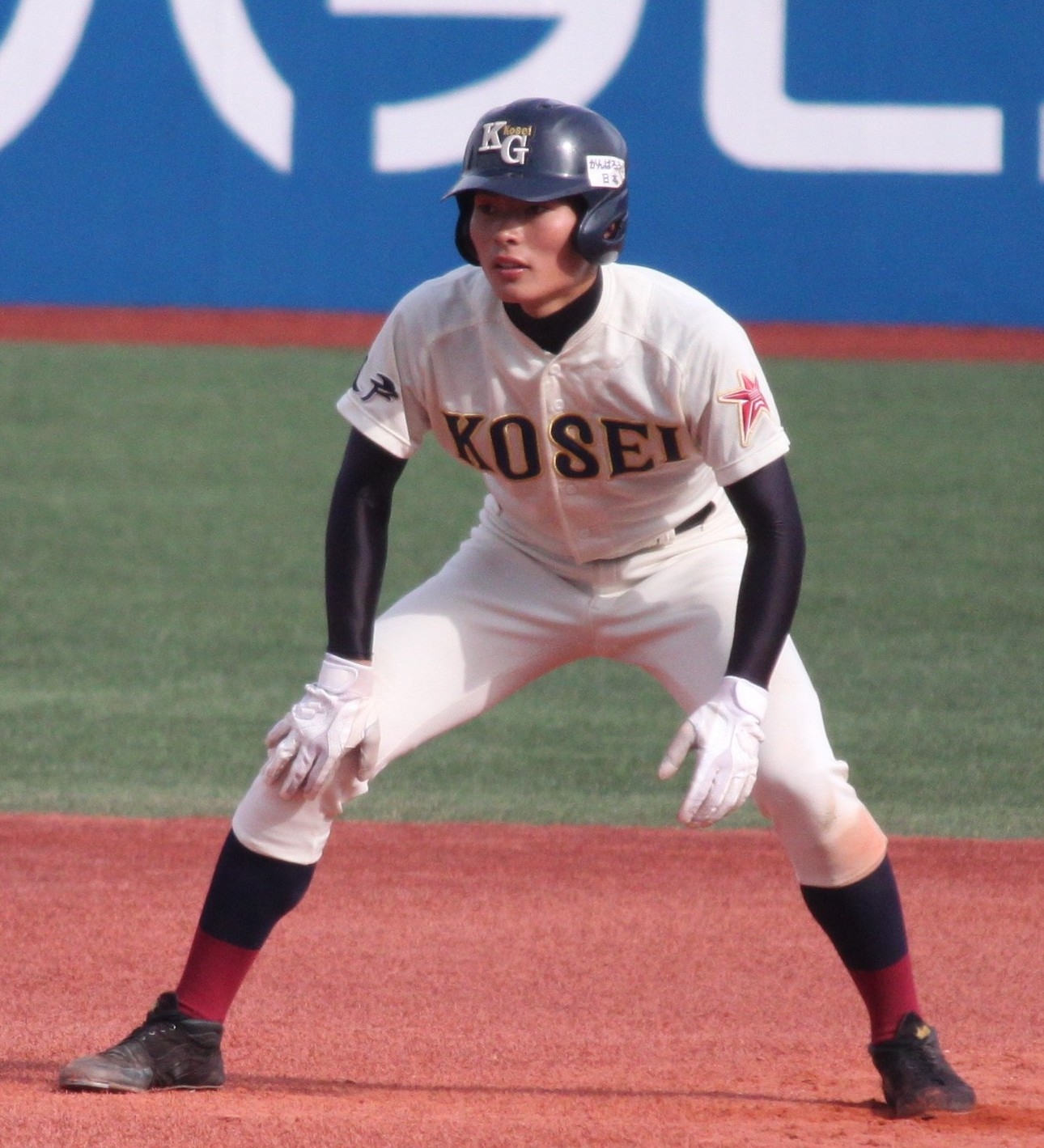
Hojo playing for Kosei Gakuin in 2011

Hojo started playing baseball in 4th grade at elementary school, and joined the All-Sayama Boys baseball club when he started at Mikita Junior High School.

He then entered Kosei Gakuin High School, a known baseball powerhouse in Aomori Prefecture. On his sophomore year, he appeared in the 2011 Summer Koshien, where he contributed 8 RBIs (highest in team history), helping his team make it all the way to the championship round. They finished as the runner-up however, when they were blanked by Nichidai-san High (11-0). During the Autumn Invitational Tournament of the same year, he batted at an average of 0.455, and racked up 7 RBIs including a lone homerun, helping his team win the championship.

In the following year's Summer Koshien, he recorded 4 homeruns as the team's 4th batter during the entire tournament, 2 of which were hit in 2 consecutive at-bats. This feat of hitting 4 homeruns in one tournament was last accomplished by former Yomiuri member Kazuhiro Kiyohara in 1985. In the tournament's final round, his team battled with pitching sensation and soon-to-be Tigers teammate Shintaro Fujinami of Osaka Toin High, but Kosei was once again denied the championship when they failed to score a single run (3-0). Nevertheless, due to his consistent performance at the plate which helped brought his team to 3 consecutive tournament championship rounds, 29 RBIs in all of his Koshien appearances (the most in Koshien history, tied with Kiyohara), and a total of 25 homeruns in his entire high school career, Hojo caught the attention of baseball scouts.

He also participated in the 2012 18U(AAA) Baseball World Championship.

== Hanshin Tigers ==
He was the Hanshin Tiger's 2nd round pick during the 2012 annual professional baseball draft, second to the highly sought-after Shintaro Fujinami. It was rumored that the Hiroshima Carps also planned to pick Hojo during the 2nd round, but when they heard that the Giants were planning to pick Seiya Suzuki in the same round, they changed their plan and picked Suzuki earlier instead. Hojo signed a 70 million yen contract with Hanshin for an annual salary of 7.2 million, and was assigned the jersey number 2.

2013

He spent his first year playing in Western League (farm) games. He played as shortstop in 84 games, batted at an average of 0.199 with 20 RBIs and a single home run. Fielding wise, he committed 18 errors. During offseason, he participated in Miyazaki Phoenix League games where he played different infield roles apart from shortstop in order to increase his chances of making it to the main roster in the next season.

2014

On July 17, he made his first Fresh All-Star Game appearance in Nagasaki as the clean-up batter (5th). He finished the season with 102 ni-gun game appearances, 23 RBIs, 2 homeruns and batting average of 0.259. His feel for the strike zone improved from the previous year as he led the league with 52 walks. He finally made it to the main roster on September 29, but never got any playing time in the end.

During offseason, he played for the national team in the WBSC U21 Baseball World Cup in Taiwan. He played in every round, batting 0.304, and contributed 8 RBIs including a 3-run homerun during the match against Venezuela, helping Japan finish as the runner-up winner. He was given the tournament's Best Nine Award as second baseman.

2015

With rumors of Takashi Toritani considering to be posted to the majors during the off-season, Hojoh was one of the candidates considered for his replacement as the team's main shortstop. Despite Toritani's declaration to stay with the team however, Hojoh was included in the main squad during spring training for the first time since he was drafted. But when he only managed to notch one hit during the pre-season exhibition games (0.067 average), he got sent back to the farm before the season began. Because of the team's abundance in infielders who specialized at either 2nd base or shortstop, Hojoh was assigned to 3rd base in most of his outings in the Western League (farm) games. His hitting improved as the season progressed, and he even batted clean-up in a couple of games.

He finally debuted as a pinch-hitter in the May 28 inter-league match against the Rakuten Golden Eagles, but his at-bat ended with a foul fly. This got him sent back to the farm once more, making this his first and final main squad at-bat for the season. Unfazed, he still continued to hit well in the farm. In the May 31 game against the Dragons, he together with Ryutaro Umeno and Taiga Egoshi notched a historic 3 consecutive home-run feat that was last accomplished in the Western League 35 years ago. He finished the season with a 0.243 average out of 112 Western League games (the most appearances for a player in the league), and led the team with 43 RBIs including 10 home runs.

2016

He again joined the main squad during spring training, and batted well during the exhibition games (0.333) which earned him a spot in the opening day roster. His first appearance was as a pinch-hitter on April 4, where he hit a solo home run against the Baystars' Kenta Ishida. A few games later, he began being included in the starting line up, and his starts gradually increased either as a 2nd or 3rd baseman. As Toritani went into a slump later in July, he then took over as the team's main shortstop. By August, he was batting lead-off at 0.311, and experienced his first Hero interview after he hit the winning run on August 10. He continued to hit well and reached his 100th hit by September 24, and became the 4th Hanshin player drafted out of high-school to reach 100 hits within his first four seasons. He spent the entire season in the main squad and appeared in 122 games, the most appearances among the team's infielders. At the plate, he finished with an average of 0.273, batted in 33 RBIs including 5 home runs, but defense-wise, he committed the most errors (12). Nevertheless, his improved overall performance earned him a pay raise that tripled his previous salary to 22 million yen.
