= Alex Guerrero (baseball) =

Cuban baseball player (born 1986)

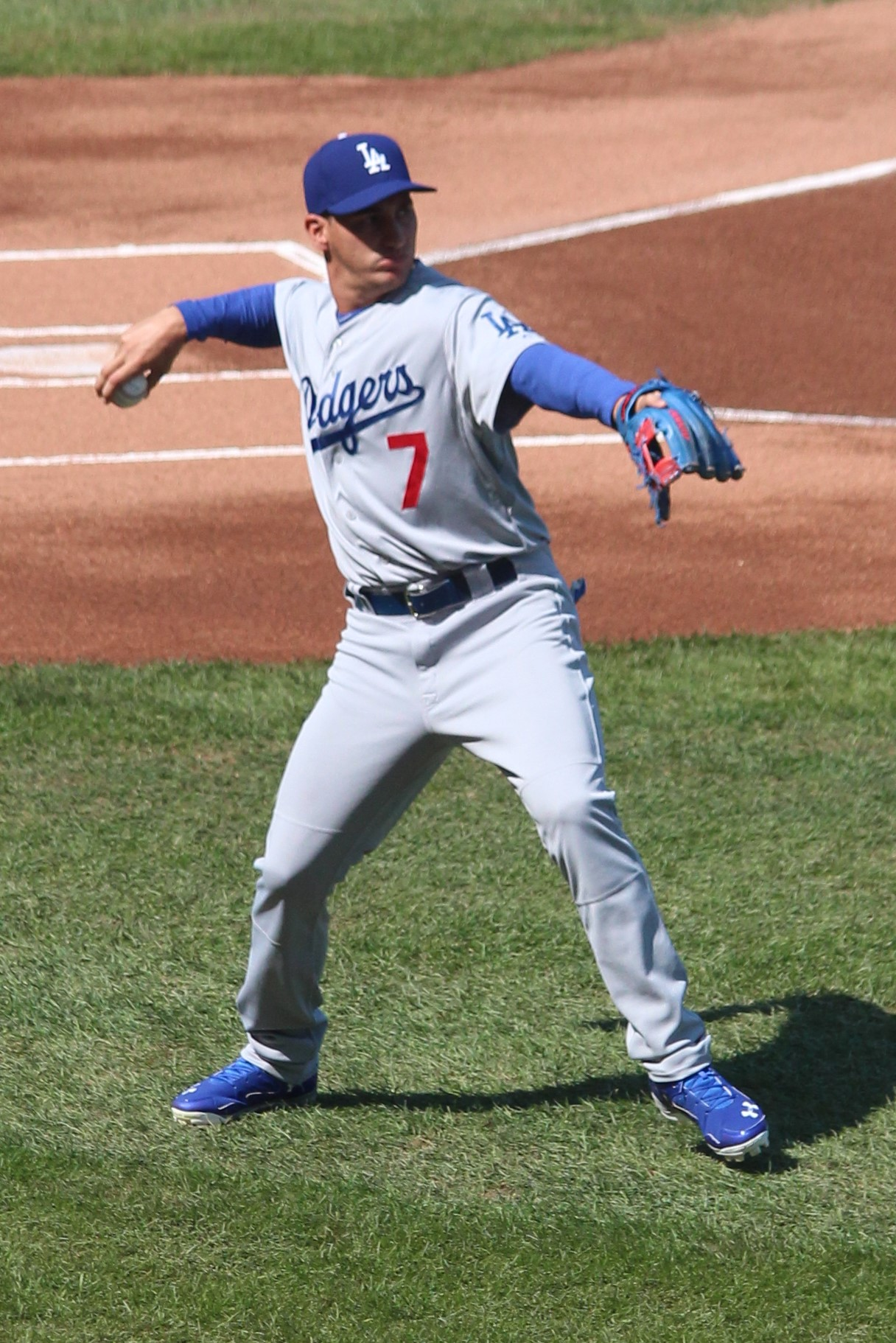
- Guerrero with the Los Angeles Dodgers
- Left fielder / Third baseman
- Born: November 20, 1986 (age 39); Las Tunas, Cuba
- Batted: Right Threw: Right

Professional debut
- MLB: March 22, 2014, for the Los Angeles Dodgers
- NPB: March 31, 2017, for the Chunichi Dragons

Last appearance
- MLB: October 4, 2015, for the Los Angeles Dodgers
- NPB: September 28, 2019, for the Yomiuri Giants

MLB statistics
- Batting average: .224
- Home runs: 11
- Runs batted in: 36

NPB statistics
- Batting average: .258
- Home runs: 71
- Runs batted in: 180
- Stats at Baseball Reference

Teams
- Los Angeles Dodgers (2014–2015); Chunichi Dragons (2017); Yomiuri Giants (2018–2019)

Career highlights and awards
- 1x NPB All-Star (2017); NL Rookie of the Month (April 2015)

Alexander Guerrero Perez (born November 20, 1986) is a Cuban-born former professional baseball left fielder and third baseman. He played in Major League Baseball (MLB) for the Los Angeles Dodgers and in Nippon Professional Baseball (NPB) for the Chunichi Dragons and Yomiuri Giants. He defected from Cuba in 2013 to pursue a contract in MLB. He signed with the Dodgers and made his MLB debut in 2014. He played primarily shortstop in Cuba, but played third base and left field for the Dodgers, who released him in 2016.

== Career ==
=== Cuban career ===
As a member of Cuba's Las Tunas team in the Cuban National Series, Guerrero was named to the 2010–2011 All-Star team as well as playing for the Cuba national baseball team at the 2012 Haarlem Baseball Week and the 2011 World Port Tournament. He was part of the initial roster for the 2013 World Baseball Classic but did not make the final roster and reportedly sat out the regular season because he was upset at his snub.

=== U.S. career ===
He defected from Cuba in 2013 and obtained residency in Haiti. He began training in the Dominican Republic and on September 9, 2013, it was reported that he had been cleared by the U.S. Office of Foreign Assets Control to sign with U.S. teams.

Guerrero was rumored to be signing with the Los Angeles Dodgers, with early reports putting his deal in the seven-year, $32 million area. However, his initial agents turned out to not be licensed and he switched to Scott Boras, who said the bidding was now wide open. On October 21, 2013, it was reported that Guerrero had reached a new agreement with the Dodgers, that would be worth $28 million over 4 years. The deal included a $10 million signing bonus and allows him to become a free agent after his age 30 season. The Dodgers officially announced his signing on October 22.

Guerrero made his professional debut with the Gigantes del Cibao in the Dominican Winter League. However, he dealt with hamstring issues and was limited to only 12 games, during which he hit .289.

=== Los Angeles Dodgers ===
==== 2014 ====
Guerrero made the Dodgers' 25-man opening day roster for the 2014 season. He made his MLB debut as a pinch hitter on March 22, 2014 against the Arizona Diamondbacks, but when Diamondbacks manager Kirk Gibson countered by putting in a right-handed pitcher, Dodgers manager Don Mattingly sent in a left-hander to pinch hit for Guerrero. Guerrero had his first official at-bat the next night, and struck out. After the two-game opening series in Sydney, Australia, Guerrero was optioned to the Triple-A Albuquerque Isotopes.

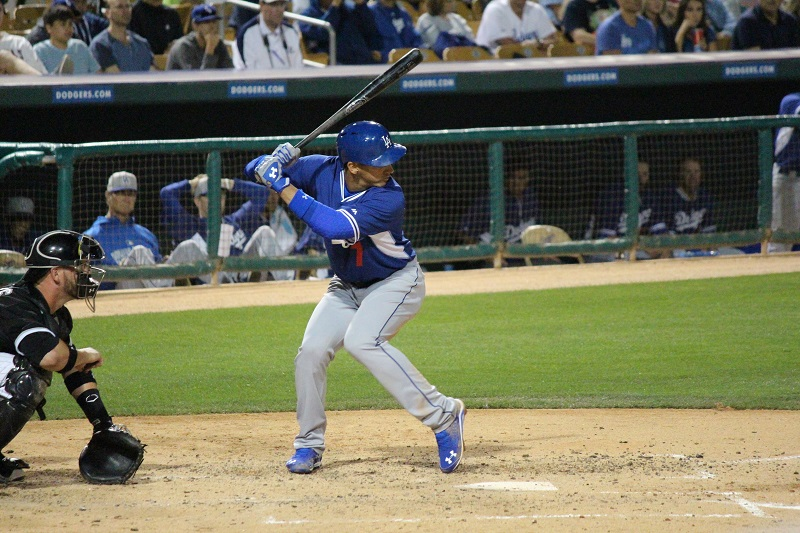
Guerrero with the Dodgers

During a game against the Salt Lake Bees on May 20, 2014, Guerrero was involved in a dugout scuffle with Albuquerque teammate Miguel Olivo in which Olivo bit off a portion of Guerrero's ear. He had to undergo a complicated plastic surgery operation to reattach the ear, necessitating several days in the hospital. In 65 games for the Isotopes, he played 51 games at second base, 9 in left field, 4 at shortstop and 1 at third base. He hit .329 with 15 homers and 49 RBI. The Dodgers recalled him when rosters expanded on September 1. He recorded his first Major League hit with a single to left field off of Erik Cordier of the San Francisco Giants on September 13. He appeared in 13 games with the Dodgers, primarily as a pinch hitter though he did play in left field for a few innings. He had just the one hit in 13 at-bats.

==== 2015 ====
In spring training, Guerrero made it clear he intended to exercise an unusual clause in his contract allowing him to refuse an assignment to the minor leagues. As it happened, he hit so well during spring training that he convinced the Dodgers he belonged on their opening day roster, despite concerns about his defense.

In his first start of the season, Guerrero had three hits in five at-bats. One of the hits was his first MLB home run, hit off Óliver Pérez of the Arizona Diamondbacks.

After two weeks, Guerrero was hitting so well there was a clamor for him to become the regular third baseman, as incumbent Juan Uribe was getting off to a slow start. Uribe, however, picked up his production, and Guerrero continued to be used in a utility role, playing at third base and at left field and pinch hitting. Despite not being a regular starter, Guerrero was named Rookie of the Month for April 2015, his first full month in the Major Leagues. He hit .423 with five homers and 13 RBI in only 13 games.

On June 2, with the Dodgers trailing the Colorado Rockies by three runs and down to their last strike in the top of the 9th inning, Guerrero hit the first grand slam of his career just over the center field wall to drive in what would be the winning run for the Dodgers.

His production tailed off down the stretch but he wound up playing in 117 games with 11 homers, 36 RBI and a .224 batting average.

==== 2016 ====
Guerrero injured his knee in spring training in 2016, causing him to begin the season on the disabled list. In a minor league rehab stint across three different levels in May, he played in 16 games and hit .136. When he was ready to rejoin the team, there was no spot available on the active roster so Guerrero was designated for assignment by the Dodgers on May 31, 2016 and removed from the 40-man roster. The Dodgers released Guerrero on June 8.

=== Chunichi Dragons ===
On November 26, 2016, Guerrero signed with the Chunichi Dragons of Nippon Professional Baseball. Guerrero broke a Chunichi franchise record for most consecutive games with a home run, with 6, after he cleared the fence against the Rakuten Eagles on 3 June 2017. He however fell short of equalling the NPB record of 7 consecutive games with a home run set by Randy Bass and Sadaharu Oh as he failed to register a hit in the final match of the series against the Eagles on 4 June. Guerrero was selected for the 2017 Central League All-Star team by choice of the manager. The Dragons released Guerrero on December 2.

=== Yomiuri Giants ===
On December 17, 2017, Guerrero signed with the Yomiuri Giants of Nippon Professional Baseball (NPB) for a two-year 800 million yen (US$5.1 million) deal. On December 2, 2019, he became a free agent.

=== Fubon Guardians ===
In May 2021, Guerrero agreed to a deal with the Fubon Guardians of the Chinese Professional Baseball League (CPBL). However, shortly after signing, Taiwan was shut down due to a COVID-19 outbreak and Guerrero was unable to enter the country. When borders reopened, Guerrero opted-out of his contract with the team without having played in a game.
