= I Like You, I Like You Very Much =

- DVD cover
- Directed by: Hiroyuki Oki
- Written by: Hiroyuki Oki
- Produced by: Akihiro Suzuki
- Starring: Chano; Hisanori Kitakaze
- Cinematography: Hiroyuki Oki
- Edited by: Film Craft
- Distributed by: ENK Promotion
- Release date: April 19, 1994
- Running time: 58 mins.
- Country: Japan
- Language: Japanese

I Like You, I Like You Very Much (あなたが好きです、大好きです。, Anata-ga suki desu, dai suki desu) is a 1994 Japanese pink film written and directed by Hiroyuki Oki, depicting gay life in Japan.

== Cast ==
- Chano
- Hisanori Kitakaze
- Naoya Matsumae
- Kazufumi Nishimoto
- Hiroyuki Oki
- Kazunori Shibuya
- Tomoko Taka
- Yoji Tanaka

== Accolades ==
It won the Silver Prize at the 1994 Pink Grand Prix ceremony. Filmmaker/actor Hiroyuki Oki was also given a Best New Director award for the film.

Preceded by Molester's Train: Nasty Behavior	Pink Grand Prix Silver Prize; 1994	Succeeded by Sexual Desires in the Ladies' Restroom: Dripping!
