= Yuki Kuniyoshi =

Japanese baseball player (born 1991)

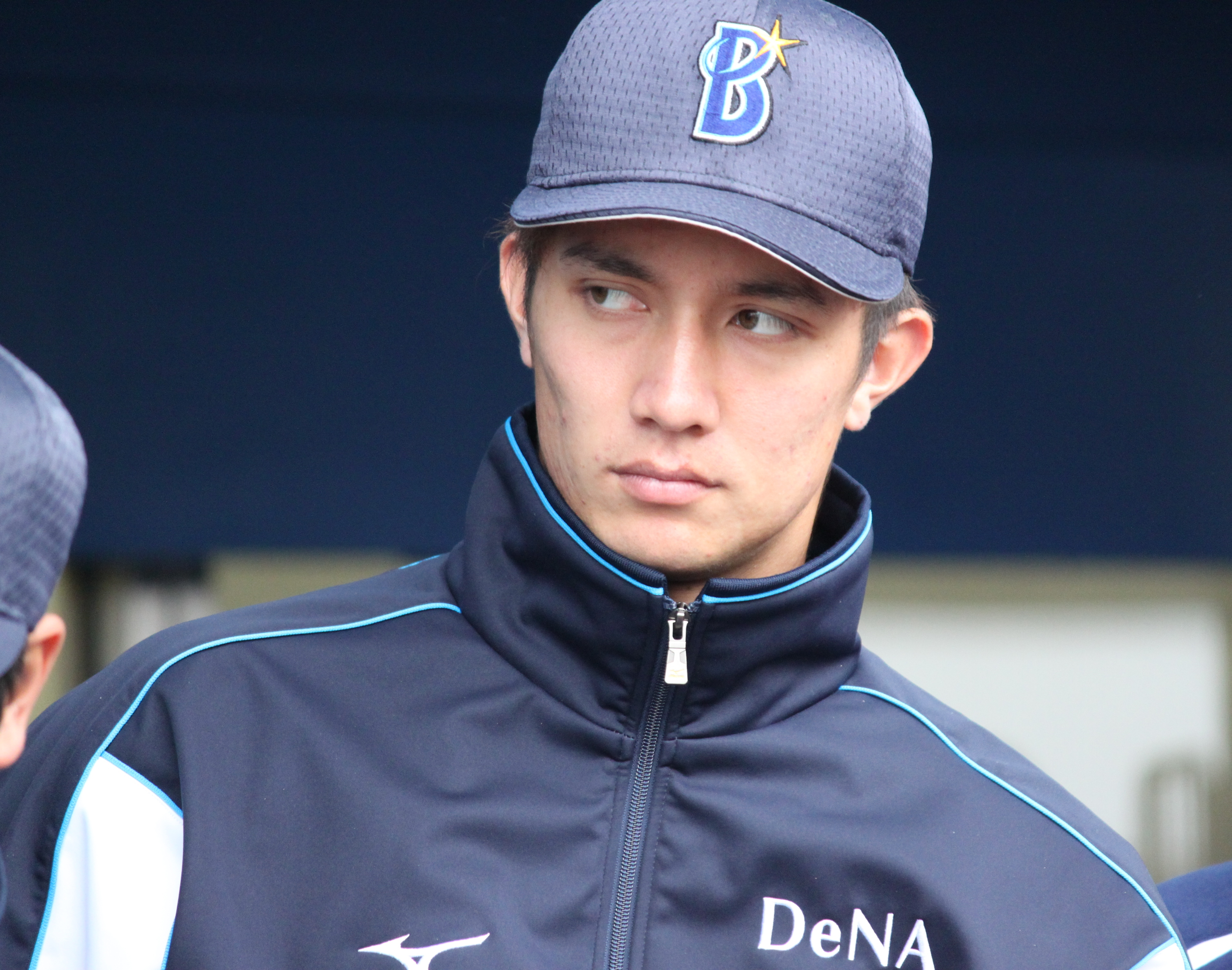
- Kuniyoshi with the Yokohama DeNA BayStars

Free agent
- Pitcher
- Born: September 24, 1991 (age 34); Hirakata, Osaka, Japan
- Bats: Right Throws: Right

NPB debut
- August 27, 2011, for the Yokohama BayStars

NPB statistics (through 2024 season)
- Win–loss record: 26-31
- Earned run average: 3.52
- Strikeouts: 466
- Stats at Baseball Reference

Teams
- Yokohama BayStars/Yokohama DeNA BayStars (2010–2021); Chiba Lotte Marines (2021–2025)

Yuki Kuniyoshi (国吉 佑樹, Kuniyoshi Yūki; born September 24, 1991) is a Japanese professional baseball pitcher who is a free agent. He has previously played in Nippon Professional Baseball (NPB) for the Yokohama DeNA BayStars and Chiba Lotte Marines.

== Career ==
=== Yokohama DeNA BayStars ===
Kuniyoshi played for the Yokohama DeNA BayStars from 2010 to 2021. In 11 seasons for the BayStars, he pitched to a 21-30 record and 3.87 ERA with 420 strikeouts in 446.0 total innings of work across 238 games.

Kuniyoshi signed with the Canberra Cavalry of the Australian Baseball League for the 2018/19 season.

=== Chiba Lotte Marines ===
On June 14, 2021, Kuniyoshi was traded to the Chiba Lotte Marines in exchange for Yuki Ariyoshi.

On January 6, 2026, Kuniyoshi signed with the Saraperos de Saltillo of the Mexican League. However, he suffered a back injury during spring training and was released by the club prior to the season on March 26.
