= Kōta Nakagawa =

Japanese baseball player (born 1994)

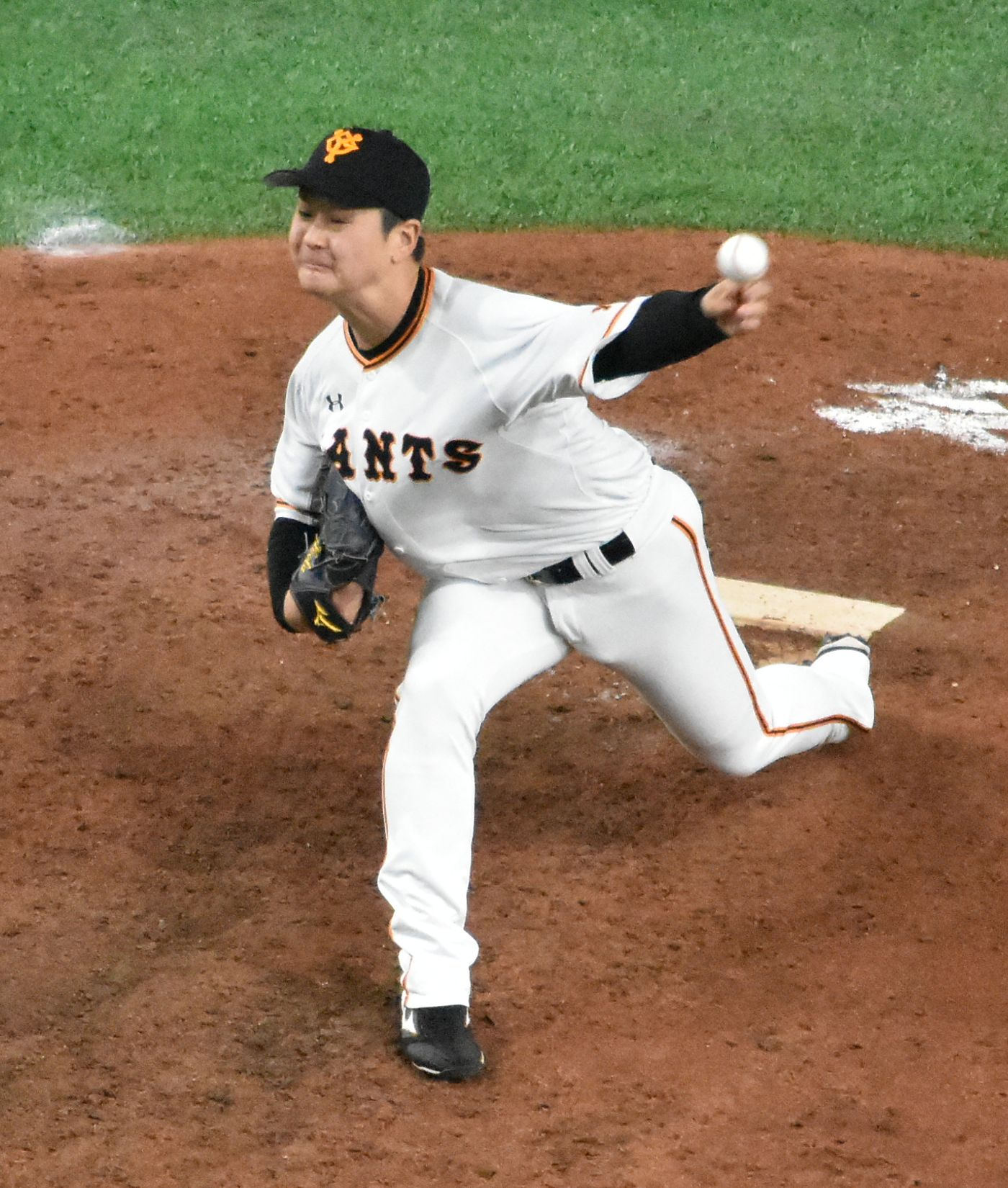
- Nakagawa with the Yomiuri Giants

Yomiuri Giants – No. 41
- Pitcher
- Born: February 24, 1994 (age 32); Tondabayashi, Osaka, Japan
- Bats: Left Throws: Left

NPB debut
- September 23, 2016, for the Yomiuri Giants

Career statistics (through August 1, 2026)
- Win–loss record: 16-18
- Earned Run Average: 2.88
- Strikeouts: 324
- Stats at Baseball Reference

Teams
- Yomiuri Giants (2016–present)

Kōta Nakagawa (中川 皓太, Nakagawa Kōta; born February 24, 1994) is a Japanese professional baseball pitcher for the Yomiuri Giants.
