= Tomo Otosaka =

Japanese baseball player (born 1994)

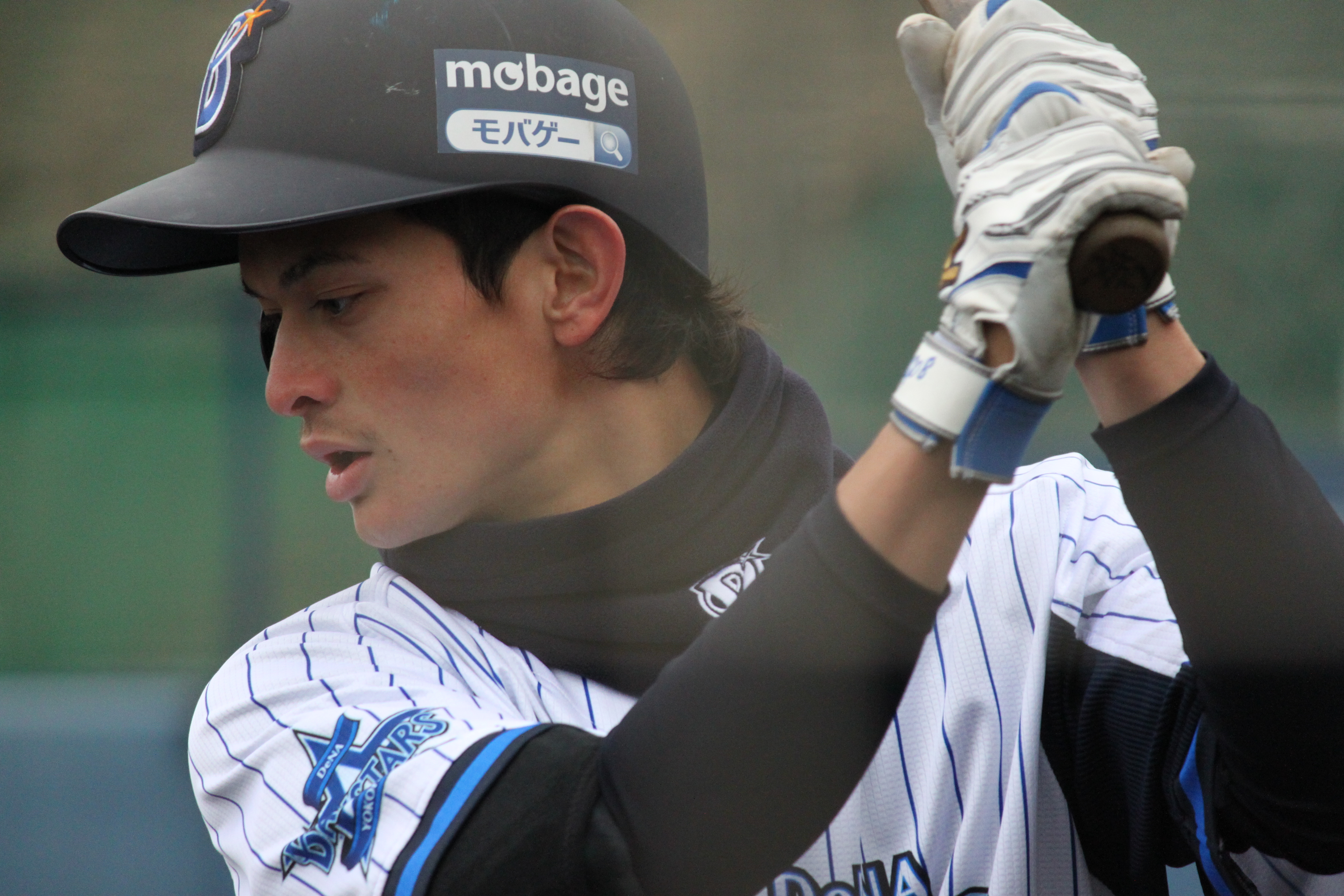
- Otosaka with the Yokohama DeNA BayStars

York Revolution – No. 6
- Outfielder
- Born: January 6, 1994 (age 32); Yokohama, Kanagawa, Japan
- Bats: Left Throws: Right

NPB debut
- May 26, 2014, for the Yokohama DeNA BayStars

NPB statistics (through 2025 season)
- Batting average: .229
- Home runs: 10
- Runs batted in: 53
- Stats at Baseball Reference

Teams
- Yokohama DeNA BayStars (2012–2021); Yomiuri Giants (2025)

Otosaka Rousselot Tomo Nicholas (乙坂・ルーセロ・智・ニコラス, Otosaka Tomo; born January 6, 1994) is a Japanese professional baseball outfielder for the York Revolution of the Atlantic League of Professional Baseball. He has previously played in Nippon Professional Baseball (NPB) for the Yokohama DeNA BayStars and Yomiuri Giants.

== Career ==
=== Yokohama DeNA BayStars ===
Otosaka began his professional career with the Yokohama DeNA BayStars of Nippon Professional Baseball (NPB) in 2012. He spent the 2012 and 2013 seasons with Yokohama's farm team, slashing .251 and .234, respectively. On May 26, 2014, Otosaka made his NPB debut, and notched his first career hit, a solo home run against the Chiba Lotte Marines, in one of only two at-bats on the year. In 2015, Otosaka played in 52 games for the BayStars, slashing .226/.276/.339 with 3 home runs and 10 RBI. For the 2016 season, Otosaka played in 55 games for the main team, hitting .270/.317/.374 with 1 home run and 8 RBI. The following season, Otosaka batted .190/.215/.333 with 2 home runs and 3 RBI in 83 games. After the 2017 season, he played for the Yaquis de Obregón in the Mexican Pacific League.

In 2018, Otosaka played in 73 games for Yokohama, posting a .204/.290/.226 slash line with no home runs and 7 RBI. The next season, he played in 97 games, slashing .245/.313/.358 with 2 home runs and 17 RBI. He spent the entire 2020 season with the club, making 85 appearances and hitting .208/.289/.267 with 1 home run and 7 RBI. On July 3, 2021.

=== Bravos de León ===
On January 31, 2022, Otosaka signed with the Diablos Rojos del México of the Mexican League. However, he was released on April 18, prior to the start of the LMB season.

On April 29, 2022, Otosaka signed with the Bravos de León of the Mexican League. He played in 38 games for León, slashing .361/.427/.500 with one home run, 10 RBI, and 14 stolen bases.

=== Saraperos de Saltillo ===
On June 14, 2022, Otosaka was traded to the Saraperos de Saltillo of the Mexican League. He appeared in 40 contests for Saltillo down the stretch, hitting .374/.469/.456 with 2 home runs, 15 RBI, and 12 stolen bases.

=== York Revolution ===
On February 21, 2023, Otosaka signed with the York Revolution of the Atlantic League of Professional Baseball. In 111 games for York, he slashed .333/.441/.408 with two home runs, 48 RBI, and 42 stolen bases.

=== Leones de Yucatán ===
On November 23, 2023, Otosaka signed with the Leones de Yucatán of the Mexican League. In 65 games for Yucatán in 2024, he hit .295/.409/.350 with no home runs, 20 RBI, and 12 stolen bases.

=== York Revolution (second stint) ===
On November 8, 2024, Otosaka was traded to the Tecolotes de los Dos Laredos of the Mexican League. However, he was released on February 10, 2025.

On February 25, 2025, Otosaka signed with the York Revolution of the Atlantic League of Professional Baseball. In nine appearances for York, Otosaka batted .405/.500/.649 with one home run, eight RBI, and four stolen bases.

=== Seattle Mariners ===
On May 9, 2025, Otosaka's contract was purchased by the Seattle Mariners. In nine appearances for the Triple-A Tacoma Rainiers, he went 6-for-23 (.261) with two RBI and one stolen base. Otosaka was released by the Mariners organization on June 28.

=== Yomiuri Giants ===
On July 12, 2025, Otosaka returned to Japan and signed with the Yomiuri Giants of Nippon Professional Baseball. Otosaka made five appearances for the Giants over the remainder of the season, going 1-for-5 (.200).

=== York Revolution (third stint) ===
On February 10, 2026, Otosaka signed with the York Revolution of the Atlantic League of Professional Baseball, marking his third stint with the team.

== Personal life ==
Otosaka's father is a former American ice hockey player.
