= Kinichiro Sakaguchi =

Kinichiro Sakaguchi (坂口 謹一郎, Sakaguchi Kin'ichirō; November 17, 1897 – December 9, 1994) was a Japanese agricultural chemist and microbiologist.

He was born in Niigata prefecture. He is the inventor of the Sakaguchi flask, a round-bottom long-neck shake flask. In Jōetsu, Niigata, a sake museum has a part of its exhibition dedicated to him.
