= Haruto Takahashi =

Japanese baseball player (born 1995)

Hanshin Tigers – No. 29
- Pitcher
- Born: November 7, 1995 (age 31); Shizuoka City
- Bats: Left Throws: Left

NPB debut
- April 11, 2018, for the Hanshin Tigers

Career statistics (through 2026 season)
- Games: 80
- Win–loss: 37-23
- Earned Run Average: 2.50
- Stats at Baseball Reference

Teams
- Hanshin Tigers (2018–present)

Career highlights and awards
- Eiji Sawamura Award (2026)

Haruto Takahashi (髙橋 遥人, Takahashi, Haruto; born November 7, 1995) is a Japanese professional baseball pitcher who currently plays for the Hanshin Tigers of Nippon Professional Baseball.

== Early baseball career ==
Influenced by his older brother, Haruto played softball at an early age, then played little league baseball for the Nishina Shonen Baseball Club in his hometown in Shizuoka.。

He entered Tokoha University Tachibana Integrated High, where doubling as a pitcher and right fielder, he helped his school win the national junior high softball tournament. In his 2nd year in high school, he pitched as a reliever in the 2012 Summer Koshien, but his team lost in the 1st round. The next year, despite declaring his intentions to become a professional baseball player after graduation, none of the teams drafted him, so he entered Asia University in Tokyo instead. He became a regular starter as his team participated in the Tohto University Baseball League, and even made it all the way to the 2016 Japan National Collegiate Baseball Championship Tournament where he was awarded Best 8. He finished with 5 wins, 7 losses and a 3.57 ERA in 31 league appearances.

== Hanshin Tigers ==
He was the Tiger's 2nd round pick during the 2017 NPB draft. He signed a 70 million yen contract with Hanshin, for an estimated annual salary of 12 million yen. He was assigned jersey number 29.

2018

The coaches made him undergo strength training during spring camp to improve his weak pitching arm as they've seen its potential. Shortly into the season, he was given the opportunity to debut as the starter for the April 11 match against the Carps. He pitched seven shutout innings and allowed only 2 hits and no runs, earning him his first career win. This victory made him the first Hanshin rookie pitcher in 6 decades to win his debut match in Koshien Stadium (since Minoru Murayama won against the Swallows in April 1959). Despite his starts having wider rest intervals than the team's other starting pitchers due to his weak arm, his continuous starts took its toll in June, prompting the coaches to stop him from pitching any further before his arm gets worse. His season ended with a 2–3 win loss record, and a 3.63 ERA. He received a 1 million raise in November, bringing his total annual salary to 13 million yen.

2019

He spent the first few months in the farm to give his arm more time to heal. His first start came on May 5 against the Baystars, but he failed to secure a win after giving up 5 runs in 4 innings. He also lost his next start, but redeemed himself on May 30 when he pitched 7 solid innings against the Giants and won the game. This was his first official win in more than a year. He continued to pitch well afterwards and was even in the running for the July MVP of the month after giving up at most 2 runs in 6 consecutive starts, but he kept failing to secure a win due to lack of run support. His continued starts took its toll on his arm once more however, and he went into a slump later in the season, losing 3 out of his 4 matches in September. He also pitched in relief during Randy Messenger's retirement game on September 29, and recorded his first career hold after pitching 2 scoreless innings. He finished the season with 3 wins, 9 losses, 1 hold and a 3.78 ERA in 19 game appearances. After Hanshin finished 3rd in the overall rankings, he started 2 games during the post-season Climax Series and helped his team beat the Baystars to reach the final stage. His improved performance earned him a 9 million pay raise, bringing his total annual salary to 22 million yen.

2020

Despite seeing less playtime in 2020 as the NPB season was shortened due to the Covid-19 pandemic, Takahashi brought his A-game early on. He held the Giants scoreless during his first start on August 6 and fanned a career first of 11. He gave away only 2 runs in his next 2 starts and finished August with 0.82 ERA. His early success against the Giants prompted the team to schedule most of his starts against them, and the gamble paid off as he notched a 2.03 ERA and gave away only 1 home run in all of his 6 starts against them. He was particularly effective against Giants prolific hitter Hayato Sakamoto who only managed 2 hits out of 16 at-bats (0.125). In contrast, he wasn't as effective against the Baystars where he recorded 4.91 ERA and 3 home runs in 2 starts. On October 5, he struck out a career-high of 14 and went the distance on 113 pitches to record his first career complete win. He finished the season with 5-4 in 12 starts, and a personal best ERA of 2.49 - second among the team's starters, behind Yuki Nishi's 2.26. 4 of his 5 wins were earned at their home stadium Koshien where he recorded a 1.47 ERA out of 5 starts there. This earned him a 7 million pay raise to bring his annual salary to 29 million yen.

His success during this season was partly attributed to forming his batteries with Seishiro Sakamoto instead of the team's mainstay catcher Umeno. After observing each batter, Sakamoto was able to set a good tempo for his throws and cleverly mixed the fastballs with the breaking pitches to confuse the opponent. Sakamoto also tends to direct Takahashi's pitches towards the edges of the strikezone

On October 26, 2026, Takahashi was named the winner of the Eiji Sawamura Award, after posting a 16–3 record with an 1.87 ERA, five complete games, four complete-game shutouts and 150 strikeouts in 159.0 innings of work.

== Pitching style ==
2020 Pitching Stats
Pitch	Percent Thrown	Hit Rate	Strikeout + Fanning Rate
Four-seam	44%	26%	19%
Two-seam	21%	16%	20%
Cutter	19%	29%	23%
Slider	11%	27%	33%
Curve	3%	29%	33%

A 5'11 southpaw pitcher with three quarters delivery, he throws a four-seam fastball as his main pitch, coupled with a cutter, a two-seamer, and an occasional curveball and slider. Despite his weak arm, his fastest pitch was clocked at 152 km/h (94 mph). His fastballs average around 150 km/h (93 mph) while his breaking balls were clocked around the 140 km/h (87 mph) range.

== Career statistics ==
- NPB Statistics
- Career statistics from Baseball Reference (Minors)
