= 2014 Nippon Professional Baseball draft =

2014 Nippon Professional Baseball Draft
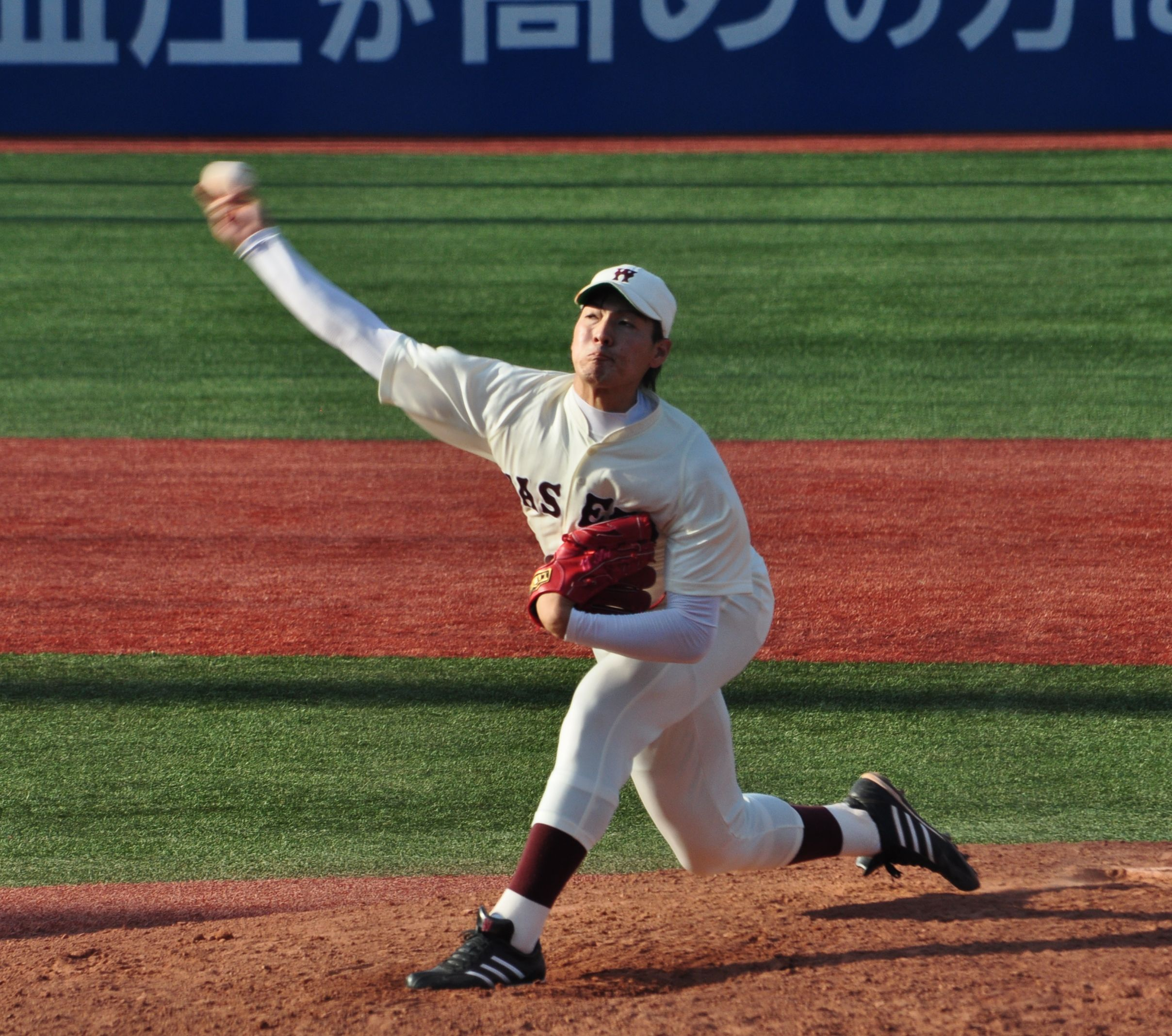
- Kohei Arihara, who was nominated and bid lottery for by four teams.

General information
- Sport: Baseball
- Date: October 23, 2014
- Location: Grand Prince Hotel Takanawa, Tokyo
- Networks: TBS (first round), sky-A
- Sponsored by: Taisho Pharmaceutical

Overview
- 105 total selections in 13 (Includes draft for developmental players) rounds
- League: Nippon Professional Baseball
- First round selections: Kohei Arihara; Tomohiro Anraku

The 2014 Nippon Professional Baseball (NPB) Draft was held on October 23, 2014, for the 50th time at the Grand Prince Hotel Takanawa to assign amateur baseball players to the NPB. It was arranged with the special cooperation of Taisho Pharmaceutical Co. with official naming rights. The draft was officially called "The Professional Baseball Draft Meeting supported by Lipovitan D".

== Summary ==
As of the 2008 Draft, High School, University and Industrial League players could be selected at the same time whereas previous to 2008, separate drafts were held for each level of player.

As with the previous year, Taisho Pharmaceuticals was the special partner with naming rights. The Draft was named "The 2014 Professional Baseball Draft Meeting supported by Lipovitan D." Lipovitan D is one of Taisho's main brands.

Only the first round picks were allowed to be contested with all picks from the second round onward being based on table placing in the 2014 NPB season in a waiver system. From the third round the order was reversed continuing in the same fashion until all picks were exhausted. The Draft waiver priority was decided upon the winners of the 2014 NPB All-Stars game, but as the series ended 1-1 preference was based on point difference between the Central and Pacific Leagues where the former had a higher differential.

In total, 81 players were signed to professional contracts including 46 pitchers, 7 catchers, 17 infielders and 11 outfielders with 23 development players also signed.

== First Round Contested Picks ==
	Player name	Position	Teams selected by
First Round	**Kohei Arihara**	Pitcher	Baystars、**Fighters**、Tigers, Carp
First Round	**Tomohiro Anraku**	Pitcher	**Eagles**、Swallows
Second Round	**Yasuaki Yamasaki**	Pitcher	**Baystars**、Tigers

- **Bolded** teams indicate who won the right to negotiate contract following a lottery.
- In the first round, **Kona Takahashi** (pitcher) was selected by the **Lions**, **Ryosuke Nomura** (pitcher) by the **Dragons**, **Shogo Nakamura** (Infielder) by the **Marines**, **Sachiya Yamasaki** (pitcher) by the **Buffaloes**, **Kazuma Okamoto** (Infielder) by the **Giants**, and **Yuki Matsumoto** (pitcher) by the **Hawks** in the first round without a bid lottery.
- In the second round, **Shingo Takeshita** (pitcher) was selected by the **Swallows** and **Takayoshi Noma** (Outfielder) by the **Carp** without a bid lottery.
- In the thrird round, the last remaining the **Tigers**, selected **Yuya Yokoyama** (pitcher).
- List of selected players.

== Selected Players ==
Key
*	Player did not sign

- The order of the teams is the order of second round waiver priority.
- **Bolded** After that, a developmental player who contracted as a registered player under control.
- List of selected players.

=== Tokyo Yakult Swallows ===
Pick	Player name	Position	Team
#1	Shingo Takeshita	Pitcher	Yamaha
#2	Ren Kazahari	Pitcher	Tokyo Nogyo University Hokkaido Okhotsk
#3	Koji Yamakawa	Catcher	Fukuoka Jyoto High School
#4	Tetsuya Terada	Pitcher	Kagawa Olive Guyners
#5	Yusaku Nakamoto	Pitcher	Hakuwa Victorys
#6	Hiroaki Dohi	Pitcher	Honda
#6	Izumi Hara	Outfielder	Daiichi Institute of Technology
Developmental Player Draft
#1	**Shogo Nakashima**	Outfielder	Fukuoka University

=== Tohoku Rakuten Golden Eagles ===
Pick	Player name	Position	Team
#1	Tomohiro Anraku	Pitcher	Saibi High School
#2	Fumiya Ono	Pitcher	Nishinippon Junior College High School
#3	Masayoshi Fukuda	Outfielder	Chuo University
#4	Luciano Fernando	Outfielder	Hakuoh University
#5	Takahiro Irino	Pitcher	Tokushima Indigo Socks
#6	Masashi Katoh	Pitcher	JR East
#7	Ryota Itoh	Infielder	Nippon Paper
Developmental Player Draft
#1	**Takumaru Yaoita**	Outfielder	Seiko Gakuen High School
#2	Hiroki Osakaya	Infielder	Aomori Chuo Gakuin University

=== Yokohama DeNA Baystars ===
Pick	Player name	Position	Team
#1	Yasuaki Yamasaki	Pitcher	Asia University
#2	Kenta Ishida	Pitcher	Hosei University
#3	Toshihiko Kuramoto	Infielder	Nippon Shinyaku
#4	Motoharu Fukuchi	Pitcher	Mitsubishi Hitachi Heavy Systems Nagoya
#5	Koki Yamashita	Infielder	Kokugakuin University
#6	Hiroki Momose	Infielder	Matsumoto-Daiichi High School
#7	Satoshi Iizuka	Pitcher	Nihon Bunri High School
Developmental Player Draft
#1	Toi Kamei	Catcher	Nissei High school

=== Saitama Seibu Lions ===
Pick	Player name	Position	Team
#1	Kona Takahashi	Pitcher	Maebashi Ikuei High School
#2	Yasuo Sano	Pitcher	Heisei International University
#3	Shuta Tonosaki	Infielder	Fuji University
#4	Yusuke Tamamura	Pitcher	Tsuruga Kehi High School
#5	Haruka Yamada	Infielder	Saga Prefectural Saga Technical High School
Developmental Player Draft
#1	**Daisuke Togawa**	Outfielder	Hokkai High School

=== Chunichi Dragons ===
Pick	Player name	Position	Team
#1	Ryosuke Nomura	Pitcher	Mitsubishi-Hitachi Power Systems Yokohama
#2	Tomohiro Hamada	Pitcher	Kyushu Sangyo University
#3	Shota Tomonaga	Outfielder	Nippon Express
#4	Shun Ishikawa	Infielder	Nippon Oil
#5	Takuma Katoh	Catcher	Aoyama Gakuin University
#6	Masataka Iryo	Outfielder	Nippon Oil
#7	Issei Endoh	Infielder	Tokyo Gas
#8	Masashi Yamamoto	Pitcher	Tokushima Indigo Socks
#9	Takeshi Kaneko	Pitcher	Osaka University of Commerce
Developmental Player Draft
#1	Yuichi Sato	Pitcher	Tokai Sagami High School
#2	Kodai Ishigaki	Pitcher	Inabe Sogo High School
#3	Masaru Fujiyoshi	Pitcher	Syugakukan High School
#4	**Hiroki Kondoh**	Outfielder	Meijo University

=== Chiba Lotte Marines ===
Pick	Player name	Position	Team
#1	Shogo Nakamura	Infielder	Waseda University
#2	Eisuke Tanaka	Pitcher	Kyoto University
#3	Daiki Iwashita	Pitcher	Seiryo High School
#4	Kandai Terashima	Catcher	Sōka University
#5	Kazuya Katsuki	Infielder	Osaka Toin High School
#6	Atsushi Miyazaki	Pitcher	Hiroshima Kokusai Gakuin University
#7	Naoto Wakimoto	Outfielder	Takasaki University of Health and Welfare High School

=== Hiroshima Toyo Carp ===
Pick	Player name	Position	Team
#1	Takayoshi Noma	Outfielder	Chubu Gakuin University
#2	Kazuki Yabuta	Pitcher	Asia University
#3	Atsuya Horie	Pitcher	Kagawa Prefectural Takamatsu-Kita High School
#4	Kouya Fujii	Pitcher	Okayama Sanyo High School
#5	Tatsuki Kuwahara	Infielder	Tokoha Gakuen Kikukawa High School
#6	Tetsuya Iida	Pitcher	JR East
#7	Daisuke Tada	Catcher	Tokushima Prefectural Naruto-Uzushio High School
Developmental Player Draft
#1	Kodai Matsuura	Catcher	MSH Academy
#2	Satoshi Kimura	Infielder	Tokoha Gakuen Tachibana High School

=== Hokkaido Nippon-Ham Fighters ===
Pick	Player name	Position	Team
#1	Kohei Arihara	Pitcher	Waseda University
#2	Yūshi Shimizu	Catcher	Kyushu International University High School
#3	Daiki Asama	Outfielder	Yokohama High School
#4	Naoya Ishikawa	Pitcher	Yamagata Central High School
#5	Hayao Segawa	Pitcher	Muroran Sharks
#6	Shota Tatsuta	Pitcher	Yamato-Koryo Senior High School
#7	Yuto Takahama	Infielder	Yokohama High School
#8	Kengo Ohta	Infielder	Kawagoe Technical High School
#9	Masataka Satoh	Catcher	Aichi Keisei High School

=== Hanshin Tigers ===
Pick	Player name	Position	Team
#1	Yuya Yokoyama	Pitcher	Nippon Steel & Sumitomo Metal
#2	Tsuyoshi Ishizaki	Pitcher	Nippon Steel & Sumitomo Metal
#3	Taiga Egoshi	Outfielder	Komazawa University
#4	Kouki Moriya	Pitcher	Honda
#5	Kai Ueda	Infielder	Ohmi Senior High School

=== Orix Buffaloes ===
Pick	Player name	Position	Team
#1	Sachiya Yamasaki	Pitcher	Meiji University
#2	Yuma Mune	Infielder	Yokohama Hayato High School
#3	Kodai Sano	Pitcher	Oita High School
#4	Ban Takagi	Pitcher	NTT East Japan
#5	Koki Saitoh	Pitcher	Hokusho High School
#6	Seiichi Sakayori	Pitcher	JR East
#7	Masahiro Nishino	Infielder	JR East
#8	Yuya Oda	Outfielder	Nippon Life
#9	Yu Suzuki	Pitcher	Tokyo Metropolitan Yukigaya High School

=== Yomiuri Giants ===
Pick	Player name	Position	Team
#1	Kazuma Okamoto	Infielder	Chiben Gakuen High School
#2	Chiaki Tone	Pitcher	Nihon University
#3	Hayato Takagi	Pitcher	Mitsubishi Heavy Industries Nagoya
#4	Daiki Tanaka	Pitcher	Kokugakuin University
Developmental Player Draft
#1	**Shinpei Shinohara**	Pitcher	Kagawa Olive Guyners
#2	Takuya Kawai	Infielder	J. F. Oberlin University
#3	**Takaya Tanaka**	Catcher	Yamanashi Gakuin University
#4	Shinnosuke Takahashi	Pitcher	Kisarazu Sogo High School

=== Fukuoka SoftBank Hawks ===
Pick	Player name	Position	Team
#1	Yuki Matsumoto	Pitcher	University of Morioka Affiliated High School
#2	Ryoya Kurihara	Catcher	Harue Technical High School
#3	Shogo Furusawa	Infielder	Kyushu International University High School
#4	Shunsuke Kasaya	Pitcher	Oita Commercial and Business High School
#5	Yosuke Shimabukuro	Pitcher	Chuo University
Developmental Player Draft
#1	Kazuhiro Koyama	Outfielder	Fuji Daiichi High School
#2	Seiya Saitoh	Outfielder	Iwata East High School
#3	Amon Yamashita	Pitcher	Komatsu Ohtani High School
#4	**Tamon Horiuchi**	Catcher	Yamamura International High School
#5	Eiji Kakinoki	Pitcher	Yanagawa High School
#6	Shota Kaneko	Outfielder	Ohmama High School
#7	Daiki Kono	Infielder	NOMO Baseball Club
#8	Keigo Nakamura	Pitcher	Toyama Thunder Birds

Preceded by **2013**	**Nippon Professional Baseball draft**	Succeeded by **2015**
