= Kodai Sano =

Kodai Sano may refer to:

- Kodai Sano (footballer)
- Kodai Sano (baseball)
