= Moriya (surname) =

Moriya (written: 森谷 or 守屋) is a Japanese surname. Notable people with the surname include:

- Akane Moriya (守屋 茜, born 1997), Japanese idol and model
- Azuma Moriya (守屋 東, 1884–1975), Japanese educator
- Fumika Moriya (森谷 史佳, born 1992), Japanese volleyball player
- Hiroki Moriya (守屋 宏紀, born 1990), Japanese tennis player
- Hiroshi Moriya (森屋 宏, born 1957), Japanese politician
- Keisuke Moriya (森谷 佳祐, born 1986), Japanese footballer
- Kentaro Moriya (森谷 賢太郎, born 1988), Japanese footballer
- Kōki Moriya (守屋 功輝, born 1993), Japanese baseball player
- Ryuichi Moriya (守屋 龍一, born 1985), Japanese archer
- Takemasa Moriya (守屋 武昌, born 1944), Japanese politician
