= Takuma Katō =

Japanese baseball player (born 1992)

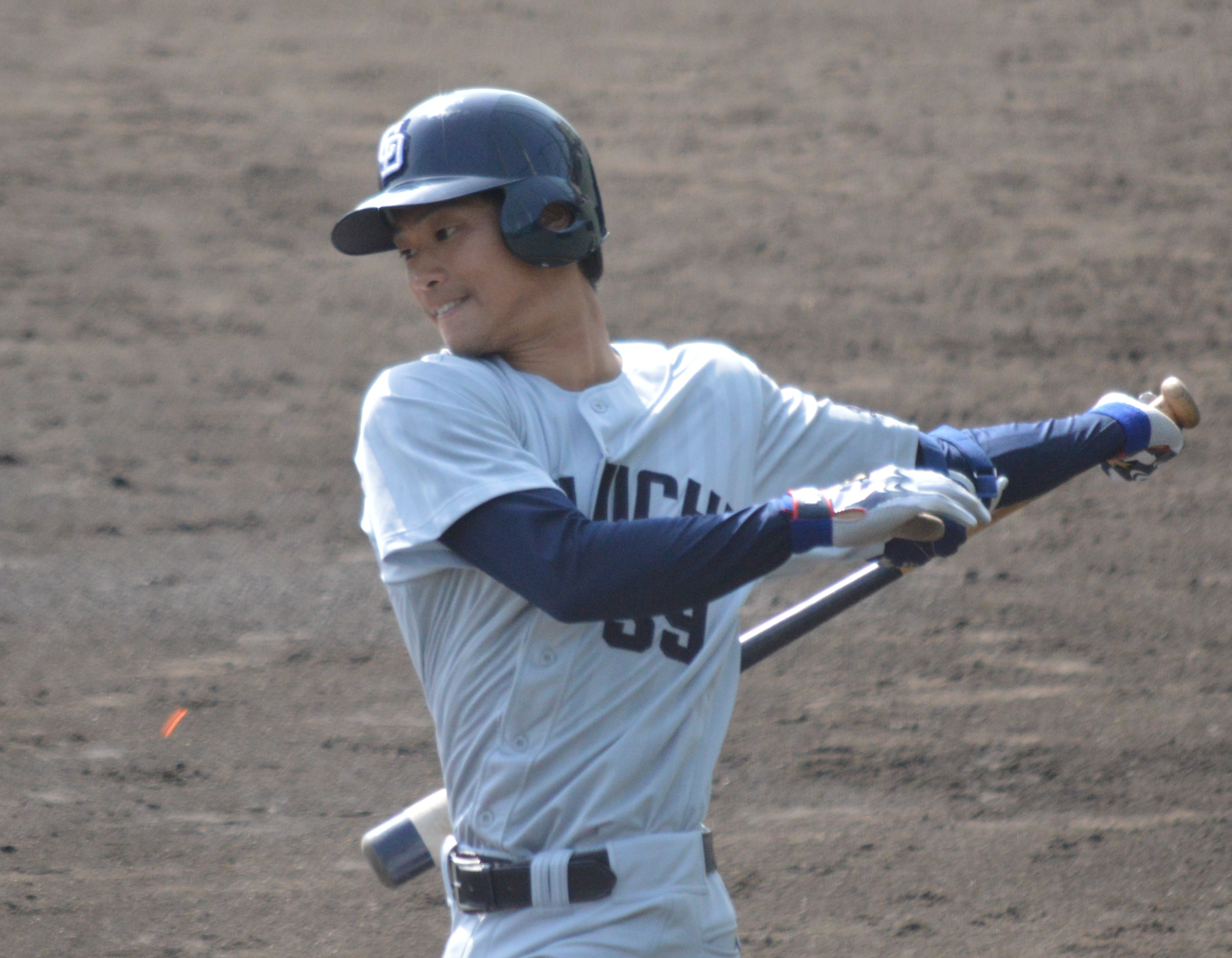

Chunichi Dragons – No. 49
- Catcher
- Born: April 29, 1992 (age 34); Matsusaka, Mie, Japan
- Bats: Right Throws: Right

debut
- May 31, 2015, for the Chunichi Dragons

NPB statistics (through 2024 season)
- Batting average: .173
- Home runs: 2
- RBI: 23
- Stats at Baseball Reference

Teams
- Chunichi Dragons (2015–2021); Chiba Lotte Marines (2021–2022); Chunichi Dragons (2023–Present)

Takuma Katō (加藤 匠馬, Katō Takuma; born April 29, 1992 in Matsusaka, Mie, Japan) is a professional Japanese baseball player. He plays catcher for the Chunichi Dragons, and formerly played for the Chiba Lotte Marines.

== Early career ==
Katō started playing baseball in elementary school and was a pitcher when he reached junior high.

At Mie High School, in his freshman year he converted to catching and by fall of his junior year he had become a regular behind the dish. He took part in the Spring Invitational in his senior year where he caught the attention of scouts after throwing out a runner.

He was regular catcher at Aoyama Gakuin University from fall of his first year where he learned to adapt his release from behind the plate to catch faster, more skilled runners.

On 22 October 2014, Katō was selected 5th by the Chunichi Dragons at the 2014 NPB Draft and on 16 November signed a provisional contract with a ¥35,000,000 sign-on bonus and a ¥8,000,000 yearly salary

== Professional career ==
=== 2015-2018 ===
On 31 May 2015, Katō made his first professional appearance as a defensive replacement against the Hokkaido Nippon Ham Fighters. On 22 May 2016 against the Yomiuri Giants, Katō made his first plate appearance in the 8th inning where he fell to a first base foul fly.

On 25 November 2016, Katō was selected alongside Ryōsuke Nomura, Shōta Suzuki, Ryōta Ishioka, Hayato Mizowaki and Hiroki Kondō to take part in the 2016 Asia Winter Baseball League.

In 2017, Katō made only one appearance in the Dragons first team while in 2018 he failed to make any appearances

=== 2019-Present ===
With incoming coaches Tsutomu Itō and Takeshi Nakamura wanting to solidify the catching position, Katō was identified, along with his "bazooka" arm to be given more time in the first-team to develop. With the team adopting a 3-catcher rotation of mainly Katō, Shōta Ōno and Takuya Kinoshita, he played in a total of 92 games, the most of any Chunichi catcher, batting .228.

On 15 June 2021, it was announced that Kato had been traded to the Chiba Lotte Marines for outfielder Shohei Kato.

== Play style ==
Katō's biggest asset is his strong arm nicknamed the "Katō bazooka".

He has been measured at a pop-time of 1.8 seconds. Chunichi coaches Tsutomu Itō and Takeshi Nakamura have said that "his arm rivals that of (Fukuoka SoftBank Hawks catcher) Takuya Kai while also mentioning that "smoke comes off the ball when he throws it".

In the 2018 Western League season against the stolen base league leaders, the Hanshin Tigers, Katō threw out 8 consecutive runners.

== Personal ==
The Dragons were Katō's local team as a boy and he recalls coming to Nagoya Dome twice to cheer on the team. Upon signing for the Dragons, Katō mentioned "I'm very happy to be putting on the uniform of the club I supported as a kid."

On 28 May 2018, Katō married, Kana, an office worker from Aichi prefecture.
