= Tatsuki =

Tatsuki (written: 樹, 達樹, 竜樹, 立規 or 辰希) is a unisex Japanese given name. It is also a Japanese surname (written: 立木). Notable people with the name include:

== Given name ==
- Tatsuki, Japanese director for anime shows such as Kemono Friends
- Tatsuki Fujii (藤井 達樹, born 1970), better known as Don Fujii, Japanese professional wrestler
- Tatsuki Fujimoto (藤本 タツキ, born 1992 or 1993), Japanese manga artist
- Tatsuki Higashiyama (東山 達稀, born 1999), Japanese footballer
- Tatsuki Katayama (片山 立規, born 1973), Japanese ice hockey player
- Tatsuki Kobayashi (小林 竜樹, born 1985), Japanese footballer
- Tatsuki Kohatsu (古波津 辰希, born 1993), Japanese footballer
- Tatsuki Kuwahara (桒原 樹, born 1996), Japanese former baseball player
- Tatsuki Machida (町田 樹, born 1990), Japanese figure skater
- Tatsuki Nara (奈良 竜樹, born 1993), Japanese footballer
- Tatsuki Seko (瀬古 樹, born 1997), Japanese footballer
- Tatsuki Shinotsuka (篠塚 辰樹, born 1998), Japanese kickboxer
- Tatsuki Suzuki (鈴木 竜生, born 1997), Japanese motorcycle racer
- Tatsuki Yoshino (吉野 樹, born 1997), Japanese handball player

== Surname ==
- Yoshihiro Tatsuki (立木 義浩, born 1937), Japanese photographer

== Fictional characters ==
- Tatsuki Arisawa (有沢 竜貴), a character in the manga series Bleach
- Tatsuki Iizuka (伊井塚 龍姫), a character in the manga series Hyakko
- Tatsuki Kuroi (黒井 直樹), a character in the manga series Gals!
- Tatsuki Nanase (七瀬 立樹), a character in the manga series C.M.B.
- Tatsuki Oohira, a character in the manga series Hands Off! (manga)
- Tatsuki (タツキ), the alias for Kiri Minase, the main character in the manga series Never Give Up!

== See also ==
- Tatsuki, a type of Pueblo clown figure
