= Shogo Nakamura =

Shogo Nakamura may refer to:

- Shogo Nakamura (baseball)
- Shogo Nakamura (runner)
