= Ryo Akiyoshi =

Japanese baseball player (born 1989)

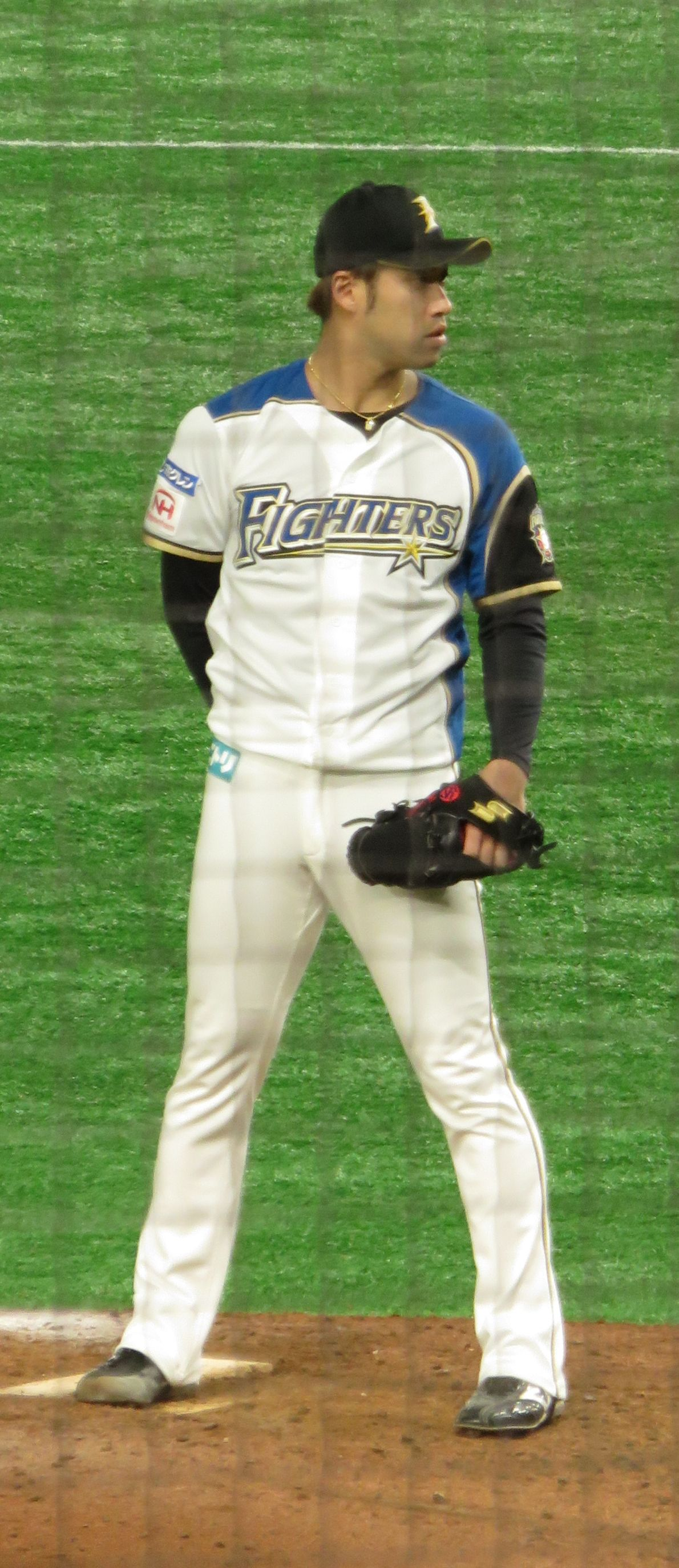
- Akiyoshi with the Hokkaido Nippon-Ham Fighters.

Free agent
- Pitcher
- Born: 21 March 1989 (age 37); Tokyo, Japan
- Bats: Right Throws: Right

NPB debut
- 1 April, 2014, for the Tokyo Yakult Swallows

NPB statistics (through 2022 season)
- Win–loss record: 20-24
- Earned run average: 3.05
- Strikeouts: 359
- Stats at Baseball Reference

Teams
- Tokyo Yakult Swallows (2014–2018); Hokkaido Nippon-Ham Fighters (2019–2021); Fukuoka SoftBank Hawks (2022)

Career highlights and awards
- NPB All-Star Game (2016)
Medals
Men's baseball
Representing Japan
2017 World Baseball Classic
Bronze medal – third place	2017	Team

Ryo Akiyoshi (秋吉 亮, Akiyoshi Ryō; born 21 March 1989 in Tokyo, Japan) is a Japanese professional baseball pitcher who is a free agent. He has previously played in Nippon Professional Baseball (NPB) for the Tokyo Yakult Swallows, Hokkaido Nippon-Ham Fighters, and Fukuoka SoftBank Hawks.

== Professional career ==
=== Tokyo Yakult Swallows ===
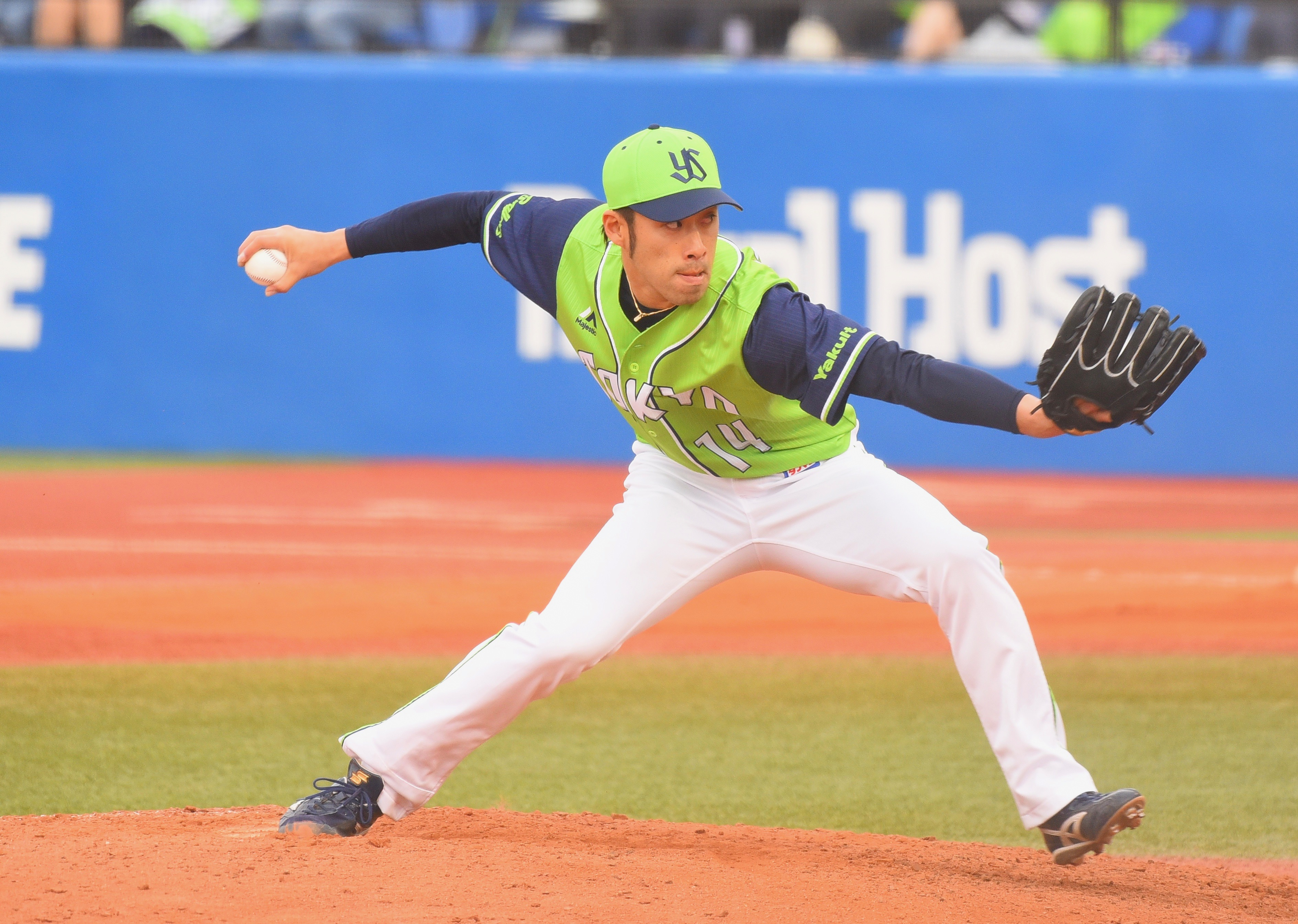
Akiyoshi with the Tokyo Yakult Swallows.

On 24 October 2013, Akiyoshi was drafted by the Tokyo Yakult Swallows in the 2013 Nippon Professional Baseball draft.

On 1 April 2014, Akiyoshi debuted in the Central League against the Hiroshima Toyo Carp as a starting pitcher. On Mayl 13, he pitched against the Yomiuri Giants and recorded his first win.

During the 2014–2018 season with the Swallows, he contributed to the team as a setup man. In all, he pitched in 283 games with a 19–17 Win–loss record, a 2.68 ERA, 67 Holds, 34 Saves, and 274 strikeouts in 298.2 innings.

On 16 July 2016, Akiyoshi was named an All-Star and pitched in the 2016 Mazda All-Star Game 2016.

=== Hokkaido Nippon-Ham Fighters ===
11 December 2018, Akiyoshi and Ryota Yachi were transferred to the Hokkaido Nippon-Ham Fighters in a 2-2 trade with Hirotoshi Takanashi and Kengo Ohta.

On 12 April 2019, he recorded his first save since joining the Fighters.

Akiyoshi played the 2019–2021 seasons with the Hokkaido Nippon-Ham Fighters, he contributed to the team as a Closer. In all, he pitched in 96 games with a 1–6 Win–loss record, a 4.04 ERA, 11 Holds, 37 Saves, and 84 strikeouts in 91.1 innings.

On 16 November 2021, he elected free agency following the 2021 season.

=== Fukui Nexus Elephants ===
On 31 January 2022, Akiyoshi signed with the Fukui Nexus Elephants of the independent league Nihonkai OCEAN League.

He recorded 18 Games pitched, a 1–2 Win–loss record, a 2.66 ERA, 7 Saves, and 35 strikeouts in 20.1 innings.

=== Fukuoka SoftBank Hawks ===
On 19 July 2022, Akiyoshi signed with the Fukuoka SoftBank Hawks. On 3 August, he made his debut as a pitcher for the Hawks. He pitched in only two games in the Pacific League in the 2022 season.

On 17 October 2022, the Hawks announced he was a free agent.

== International career ==
On 15 February 2016, Akiyoshi represented the Japan national baseball team at the Samurai Japan Warm-up Game Japan vs Chinese Taipei.

24 January 2017, he was elected to the Japan national baseball team at the 2017 World Baseball Classic.
