= Yuya Yokoyama =

Japanese baseball player (born 1994)

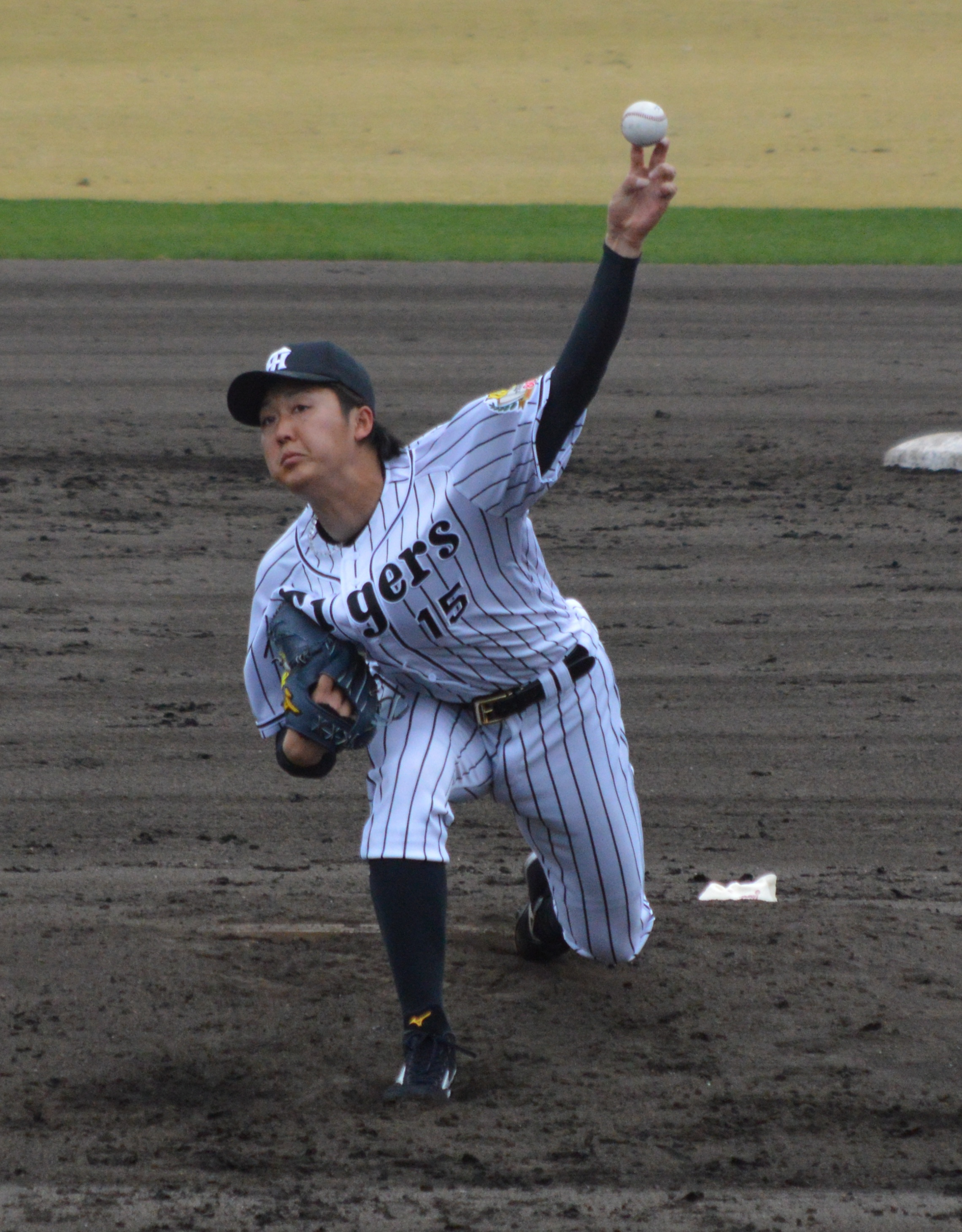
- Yokoyama with the Hanshin Tigers
- Pitcher
- Born: February 21, 1994 (age 32); Murayama, Yamagata, Japan
- Batted: Left Threw: Left

NPB debut
- May 21, 2015, for the Hanshin Tigers

Last NPB appearance
- October 14, 2020, for the Hanshin Tigers

NPB statistics
- Win–loss record: 9–3
- ERA: 4.67
- Strikeouts: 33
- Stats at Baseball Reference

Teams
- Hanshin Tigers (2015–2020)

Yūya Yokoyama (横山 雄哉, Yokoyama Yūya; born February 21, 1994 in Murayama, Yamagata) is a Japanese former professional baseball pitcher. He played in Nippon Professional Baseball (NPB) for the Hanshin Tigers from 2015 to 2020.

== Early baseball career ==
Born in Murayama City, Yūya started playing baseball in 2nd grade, and joined the Nakayama Municipal Junior High's baseball club when he entered middle school. During his sophomore year in Yamagata Central High School, he played as the team's ace pitcher in both spring and summer Koshien tournaments, but his school never made it past the first round. And even though he was often likened to Seibu's Yusei Kikuchi, a highly sought after pitching prodigy out of high school back in 2009, he did not receive any nominations from any of the 12 NPB teams in the 2011 draft.

Upon graduating high school, he joined Shin Nittetsu Sumikin Kashima to play for the industrial leagues. He became known for his cutting sliders and fastballs that maxed at 147 km/h, and was compared to Hanshin's Atsushi Nomi – a fellow lefty who also started his career at the industrial leagues under Osaka Gas. He also played for the national team in the 2014 21U Baseball World Cup, where he pitched a total of 10 innings in 3 games, and recorded 20 strikeouts, helping Japan finish second overall.

== Professional career ==
He was the Hanshin Tigers' 1st round pick (3rd choice, after they lost Kohei Arihara and Yasuaki Yamasaki) in the 2014 NPB draft. In November 26, he signed with the Tigers for a provisional contract of 100 million yen and 50 million signing bonus, for an annual salary of 15 million yen. He was assigned the jersey no. 15. With this, he became just the 2nd Tigers player to hail from Yamagata prefecture (since Shigeichi Aoki in 1978), and the 1st ever pitcher.

His teammate from Shin Nittetsu, Tsuyoshi Ishizaki was the Tiger's 2nd pick during the same draft, making them the first players from the same team to be drafted as the 1st and 2nd picks in franchise history, and the first pitchers from the same team to be drafted as such in NPB history.

After pitching in the 21U World Cup in November 2014, he experienced tightness in his left arm and avoided any throwing exercises for the rest of the year. In January, he was diagnosed with inflammation in his left sternoclavicular joint, and only resumed pitching in early February. He pitched his first practice game against Orix on March 8, and gave up 2 runs on 3 hits over 2 innings of work, topping out at 148 km/h. On April 18, he started a Western League (minors) game against Hiroshima and tossed seven shutout innings, striking out 6. He started another on May 15 against the same team, where he gave up a run on 4 hits over 5 innings of work.

He debuted in his home turf on May 21 against the Giants, and pitched 7 solid innings – topping out at 149 km/h. He gave up 6 hits, struck out 6, and surrendered the game's lone run from Leslie Anderson's two-base hit on top of the 6th. The Tigers won that day when Toritani batted in the winning hit on the 8th inning.

On November 27, 2020, Yokoyama announced his retirement.

== Playing style ==
Listed at 183 centimetres, Yokoyama is a southpaw pitcher with an overhand delivery. His fastball was clocked at a maximum of 151 km/h, and he can also throw sliders and loose curves for breaking balls, and forkballs for changeup.
