= Ren Kazahari =

Japanese baseball player (born 1993)

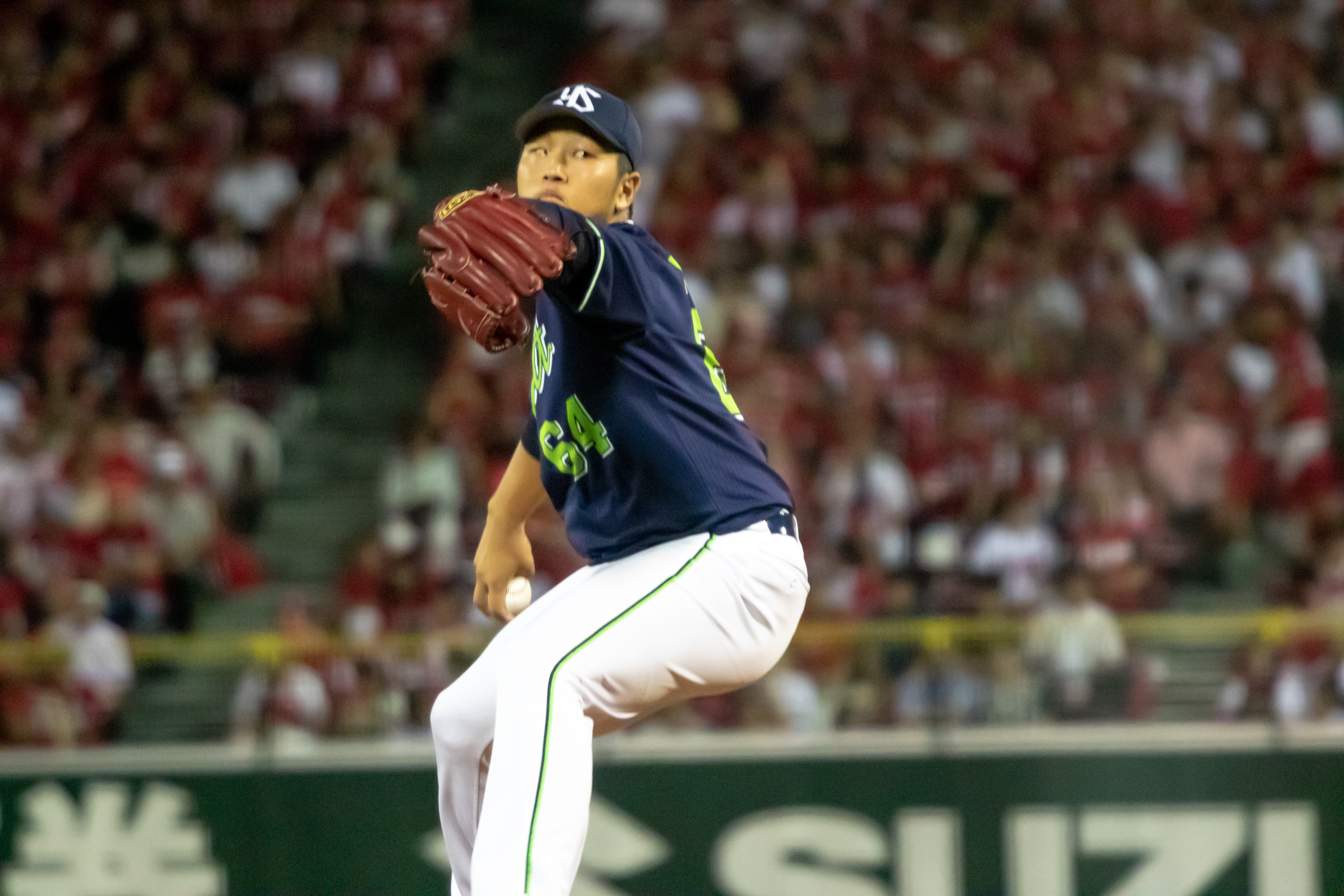

Free agent
- Pitcher
- Born: February 26, 1993 (age 33); Kunohe, Iwate, Japan
- Bats: Right Throws: Right

NPB debut
- May 3, 2015, for the Tokyo Yakult Swallows

NPB statistics (through 2021 season)
- Win–loss: 2–4
- Holds: 5
- ERA: 5.91
- Strikeouts: 108
- Stats at Baseball Reference

Teams
- Tokyo Yakult Swallows (2015–2020); Yokohama DeNA BayStars (2021)

Ren Kazahari (風張 蓮, Kazahari Ren; born February 26, 1993) is a Japanese professional baseball pitcher who is a free agent. He has previously played in Nippon Professional Baseball (NPB) for the Tokyo Yakult Swallows and Yokohama DeNA BayStars.

== Career ==
=== Tokyo Yakult Swallows ===
Tokyo Yakult Swallows selected Kazahari with the third selection in the 2014 NPB draft.

On May 3, 2015, Kazahari made his NPB debut.

On December 2, 2020, he became a free agent.

=== Yokohama DeNA BayStars ===
On December 10, 2020, Kazahari signed with Yokohama DeNA BayStars of NPB. Kazahari made five appearances for Yokohama in 2021, but struggled to a 7.71 ERA with six strikeouts over seven innings of work.

=== Wild Health Genomes ===
On February 23, 2022, Kazahari signed with the Wild Health Genomes of the Atlantic League of Professional Baseball. Kazahari pitched in 4 games for the Genomes, struggling to a 9.64 ERA with 5 strikeouts in 4.2 innings pitched. He was released by the team on August 1.
