= Ryosuke Nomura =

Japanese baseball player (born 1993)

Chunichi Dragons – No. 114
- Batting-practice Pitcher
- Born: July 9, 1993 (age 32); Shimizu, Shizuoka, Japan
- Batted: Right Threw: Right

debut
- June 25, 2015, for the Chunichi Dragons

Last NPB appearance
- July 14, 2015, for the Chunichi Dragons

NPB statistics
- Innings pitched: 2.2
- Earned run average: 10.13
- Strikeouts: 1
- Stats at Baseball Reference

Teams
- Chunichi Dragons (2015)

Ryosuke Nomura (野村 亮介, Nomura Ryosuke; born July 9, 1993) is a former Japanese baseball pitcher who played for Chunichi Dragons in Nippon Professional Baseball. He now serves the team as a batting practice pitcher.

The Chunichi Dragons drafted him in the first round of the 2014 draft.

== Early career ==
Born in Shimizu in Shizuoka Prefecture, Nomura started playing baseball from his first year of elementary school with the Sakata Little Giants. In his third year of middle school, he played for Sakata Shimizu at the National rubber-ball Baseball Championships.

He attended Shimizu High School where in his third year he appeared in the 2011 Spring Senbatsu tournament. In the first game he conceded three earned runs as winning pitcher against Kyoto Seisho and would in the second game throw a complete game for 3 earned runs but would unfortunately be on the losing end against Nichidaisan High. In the Summer Koshien Shizuoka prefectural tournament in the same year, Nomura's team got to the quarter-finals before being bundled out by Tokoha Gakuen Kikukawa High School.

He chose not to go through the university leagues and was picked up by the Mitusbishi-Hitachi Power Systems Yokohama baseball team that plays in the industrial leagues where in his first year he took part in the Intercity baseball tournament. In his second year he started 9 games for a 7.71 ERA but, after improvements and adjustments to his throwing form, Nomura came back in his third year with a 2.11 ERA. He was subsequently selected to represent Japan at the 2014 21U Baseball World Cup.

At the 2014 NPB Draft held on 23 October 2014, Nomura was selected as the first draft pick for the Chunichi Dragons and was given a ¥100,000,000 signing on bonus plus ¥5,000,000 in incentives to go with a ¥15,000,000 yearly salary. In the draft, it was Yasuaki Yamasaki who received the most attention and was to be expected to be subjected to first choice picks from almost all teams but as Dragons GM Hiromitsu Ochiai rated Nomura very highly, his selection was recommended to player-manager Motonobu Tanishige and the decision was made. Following Nomura's selection, Tanishige commented that "we have selected a player that can enter the starting rotation. He is a player with great control and stamina; someone we think is the most complete starting pitcher (available)."

He was given the number 20 formally worn by Chunichi aces Shigeru Sugishita, Hiroshi Gondoh, Senichi Hoshino and Tatsuo Komatsu. The number was relieved by the departure of Kenichi Nakata in the 2013 off-season.

Following the draft, he took part in the IBAF 2014 21U Baseball World Cup pitching as a closer in 3 games without conceding but gave up 5 hits and 2 earned runs in the final against Taiwan.

== Professional career ==
=== Chunichi Dragons ===
==== 2015 ====
On 25 June 2015, in a game against the Tokyo Yakult Swallows at the Nagoya Dome, Nomura made his debut relieving in the 9th inning. While he was able to take care of his first batter, Naomichi Nishiura, he would finish the game having walked 4 while giving up 3 earned runs.

He finished the season having made 3 appearances, pitching 2.2 innings for a 10.13 ERA.

In the Western League he made 14 appearances with a 1–2 record, pitching 34.1 innings with 23 strikeouts and a 3.41 ERA.

On 17 November, as Nomura failed to live up to expectation, his yearly salary was heavily slashed by senior management, reduced by ¥3,700,000 to ¥11,300,000.

==== 2016 ====
Nomura failed to make any appearances for the first team in 2016 and further had his salary slashed as a result from ¥11,300,000 to ¥8,480,000.

=== 2017 ===
Nomura once again failed to make an impact in 2017 and was cut from the team on October 4. Nomura later rejoined the club as a batting practice pitcher.

== Pitching Style ==
In his third year in the industrial leagues, Nomura clocked a high of 149 km/h with his fastball. He can also throw a variety of off-speed pitches including a curve, slider, forkball and cutter.

According to Dragons GM, Hiromitsu Ochiai, Nomura is "a pitcher that is everywhere" and was especially impressed on the third time he watched the player as the quality of his pitches never fell when he was seen as a closing pitcher.
