= Kai Ueda =

Japanese baseball player (born 1996)

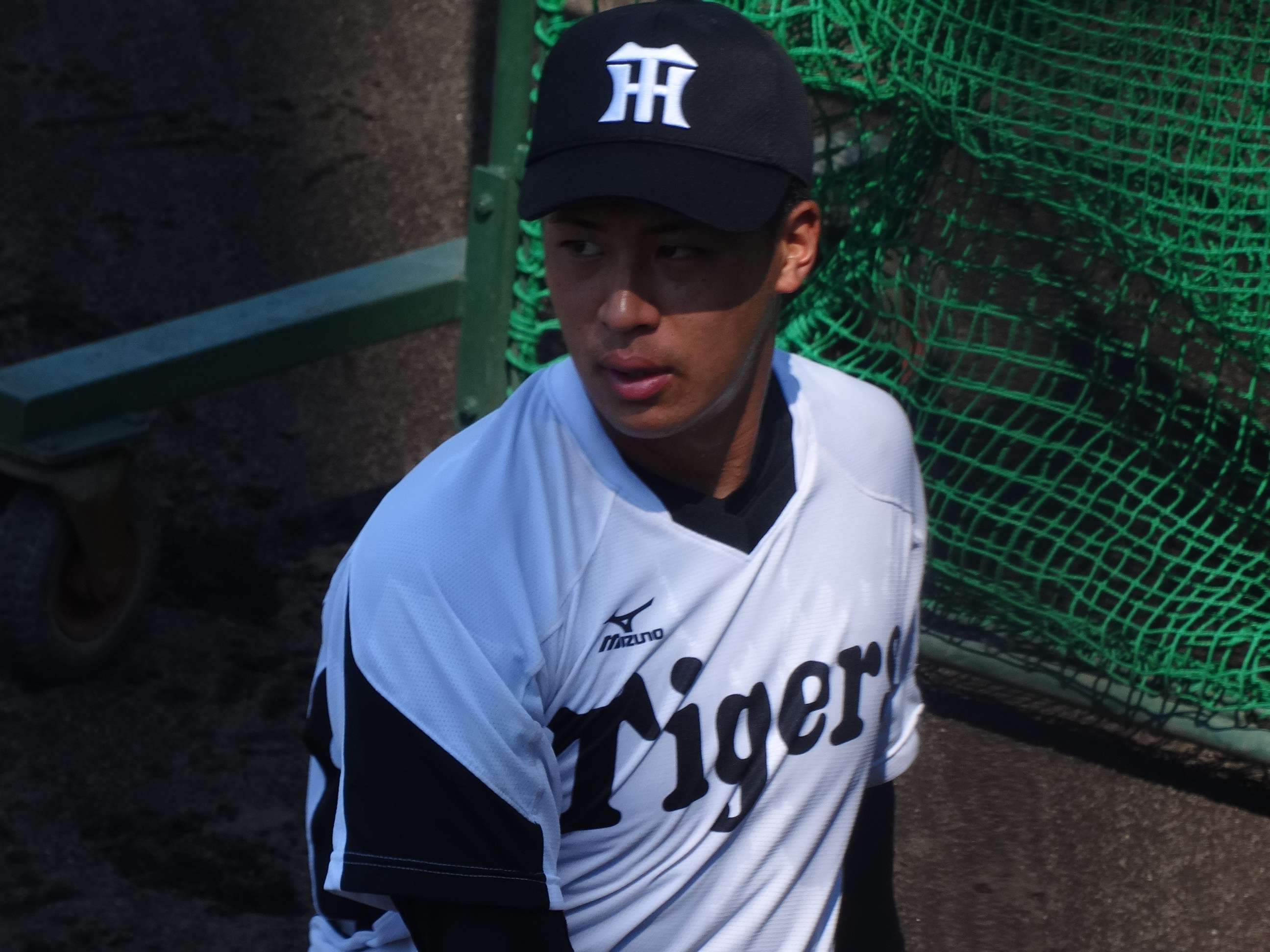
- Ueda at the Naruohama stadium, 2016

Hanshin Tigers – No. 62
- Infielder
- Born: April 19, 1996 (age 30); Kōka, Shiga, Japan
- Bats: Switch Throws: Right

NPB debut
- October 1, 2016, for the Hanshin Tigers

NPB statistics (through 2025 season)
- Batting average: .194
- Home runs: 1
- Runs batted in: 11
- Stolen bases: 67
- Stats at Baseball Reference

Teams
- Hanshin Tigers (2015–present)

Kai Ueda (植田 海, Ueda Kai; born April 19, 1996) is a Japanese professional baseball infielder for the Hanshin Tigers of Nippon Professional Baseball (NPB).

== Amateur career ==
Ueda started playing baseball in 2nd grade for the Kohnan Boys Baseball Club, where he alternated between pitcher and shortstop positions. It was only when he entered junior high that he decided to become a full-time shortstop.

He initially enrolled in the Japan Aviation High School in Yamanashi Prefecture, but decided to return to his hometown after a year. He transferred to Oumi High School where he secured the baseball team's shortstop position. In 2014, he helped his team make it all the way to the 96th Summer Koshien Tournament. Even though his team lost in the 3rd round, he recorded an impressive batting average of 0.571.

== Professional career ==
Before he graduated high school, he became the Hanshin Tigers' 5th round pick during the 2014 Nippon Professional Baseball draft. He signed the deal with the Tigers for a $5 million annual salary, and a 30 million signing bonus. He was assigned the jersey number 62.
