= Naoya Ishikawa =

Japanese baseball player (born 1996)

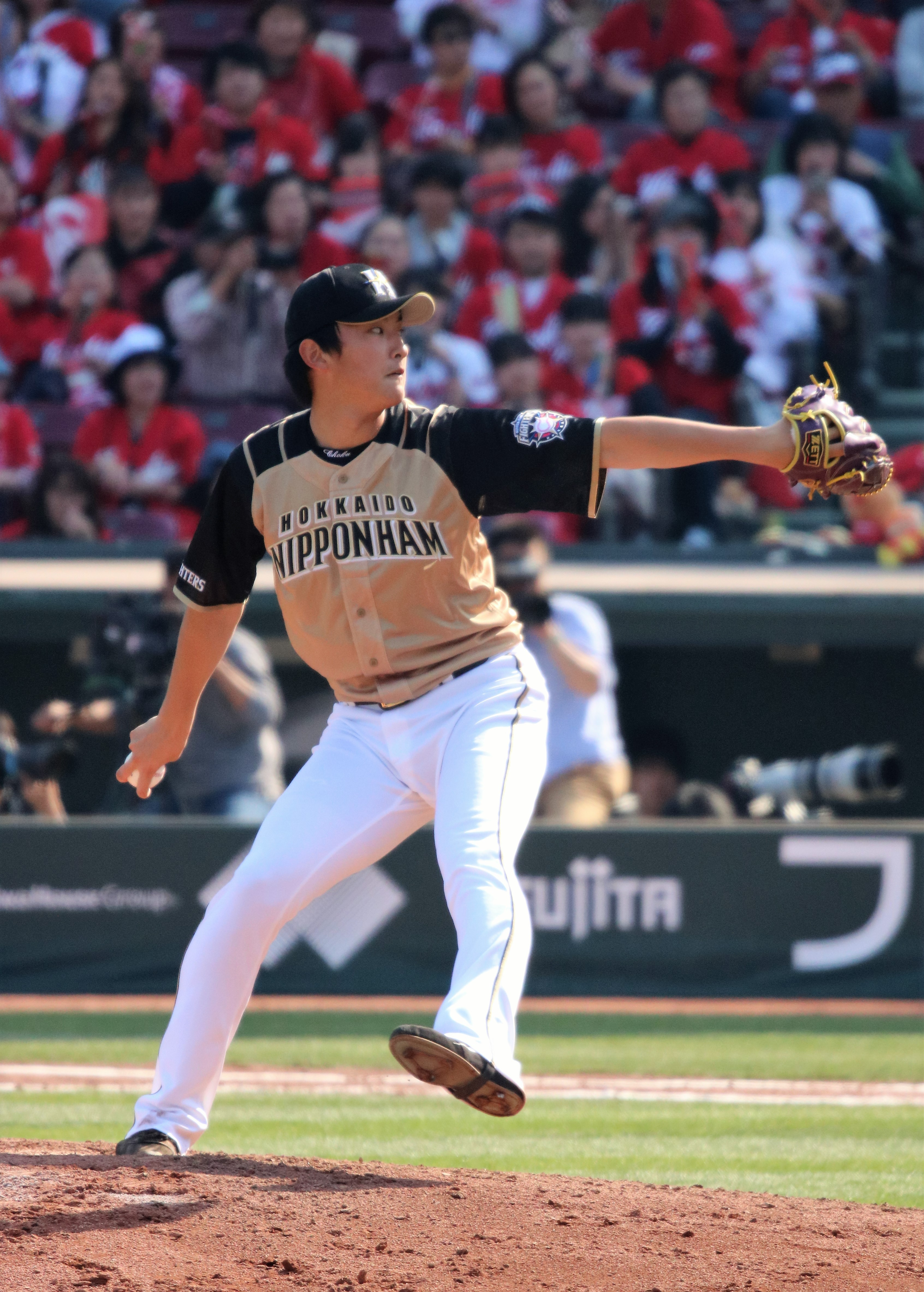

Oisix Niigata Albirex – No. 51
- Pitcher
- Born: July 11, 1996 (age 29); Amarume, Yamagata, Japan
- Bats: Right Throws: Right

NPB debut
- September 30, 2016, for the Hokkaido Nippon-Ham Fighters

Career statistics (through 2025 season)
- Win–loss record: 6-7
- Earned Run Average: 3.67
- Strikeouts: 228
- Holds: 58
- Saves: 31
- Stats at Baseball Reference

Teams
- Hokkaido Nippon-Ham Fighters (2015–2025); Oisix Niigata Albirex (2026–)

Naoya Ishikawa (石川 直也, Ishikawa Naoya; born July 11, 1996 in Higashitagawa, Yamagata, Japan) is a professional Japanese baseball player. He plays pitcher for the Oisix Niigata Albirex

== Career ==
=== Hokkaido Nippon-Ham Fighters ===
On October 23, 2014, Ishikawa was selected by the Hokkaido Nippon-Ham Fighters with their fourth pick of the 2014 NPB draft.

On October 22, 2025, Ishikawa was released by the Fighters.

=== Oisix Niigata Albirex ===
On December 10, 2025, Ishikawa signed with the Oisix Niigata Albirex.
