= Hiroki Momose =

Japanese baseball player (born 1997)

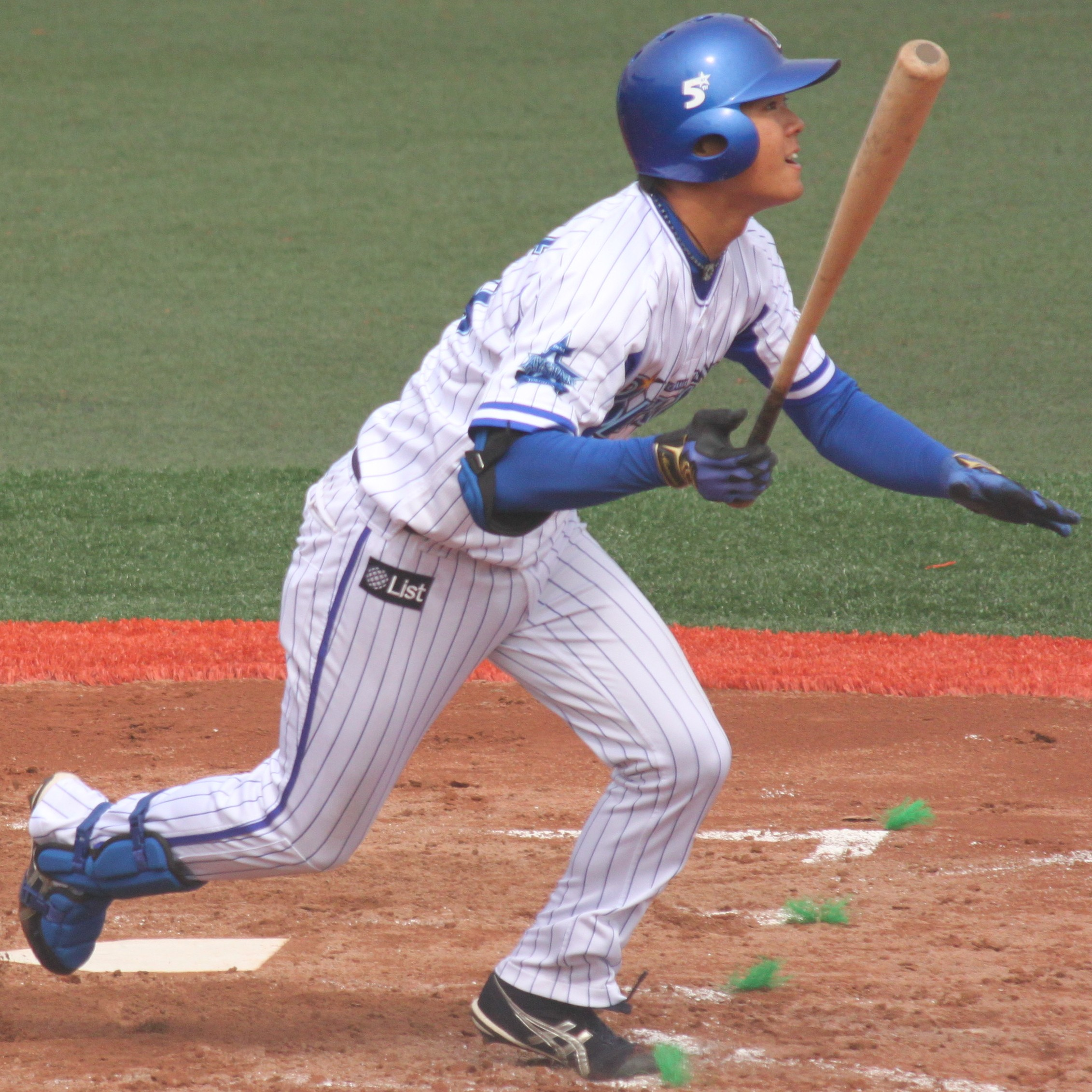
- Momose with the Yokohama DeNA BayStars
- Infielder
- Born: March 11, 1997 (age 29); Matsumoto, Nagano, Japan
- Batted: Right Threw: Right

NPB debut
- July 31, 2019, for the Yokohama DeNA BayStars

Last NPB appearance
- September 4, 2020, for the Yokohama DeNA BayStars

NPB statistics
- Batting average: .200
- Home runs: 0
- Runs batted in: 1
- Stats at Baseball Reference

Teams
- Yokohama DeNA BayStars (2015–2020)

Hiroki Momose (百瀬 大騎, Momose Hiroki; born March 11, 1997) is a Japanese former professional baseball infielder. He played in Nippon Professional Baseball (NPB) for the Yokohama DeNA BayStars.

== Career ==
Yokohama DeNA BayStars selected Momose with the sixth selection in the 2014 NPB draft.

On July 31, 2019, Momose made his NPB debut.

On December 15, 2020, Momose announced his retirement.
