= Takeshi Kaneko =

Japanese baseball player

Chunichi Dragons
- Pitcher/Scorer
- Born: February 25, 1993 (age 33); Ibaraki, Osaka, Japan
- Bats: Right Throws: Right

debut
- April 16, 2015, for the Chunichi Dragons

NPB statistics (through 2016)
- Win–loss: 0–0
- ERA: 4.91
- Strikeouts: 12

Teams
- Chunichi Dragons (2015–2017)

Takeshi Kaneko (金子 丈, Kaneko Takeshi; born February 25, 1993 in Ibaraki, Osaka, Japan) is a retired professional Japanese baseball player. He was a pitcher for the Chunichi Dragons.

== Early career ==
In his university career, Kaneko performed as both a starter and a reliever for Osaka University of Commerce. In the Kansai6 Baseball League in Spring of his third year, Kaneko recorded 4 consecutive shutouts. His overall record for his university was 65 games played with a 23–17 win-loss record and a 1.85 ERA. He is one year the university senior of teammate, Iori Katsura.

At the 2014 Nippon Professional Baseball draft, Kaneko was selected 9th by the Chunichi Dragons where he went on to sign a ¥6,000,000 contract with a ¥15,000,000 sign on bonus.

== Professional career ==
=== Chunichi Dragons ===
==== 2015 ====
On 16 April, Kaneko made his debut against the Hanshin Tigers at the Nagoya Dome in one inning of relief where he retired 3 batters in a row. He was the first of the 4 pitchers drafted in 2014 to make his debut.

Kaneko would go on to play in a further 10 games all coming as a relief pitcher where he threw 13.2 innings with a 3.95 ERA and 12 strikeouts.

==== 2016 ====
Only one appearance would happen for Kaneko in 2016 where on May 8 he took charge of the 9th inning against the Yomiuri Giants with the Dragons holding an 11–2 lead where Kaneko gave up a 2-run homerun to Yoshiyuki Kamei before closing out.
