= Tatsuki Kuwahara =

Japanese baseball player

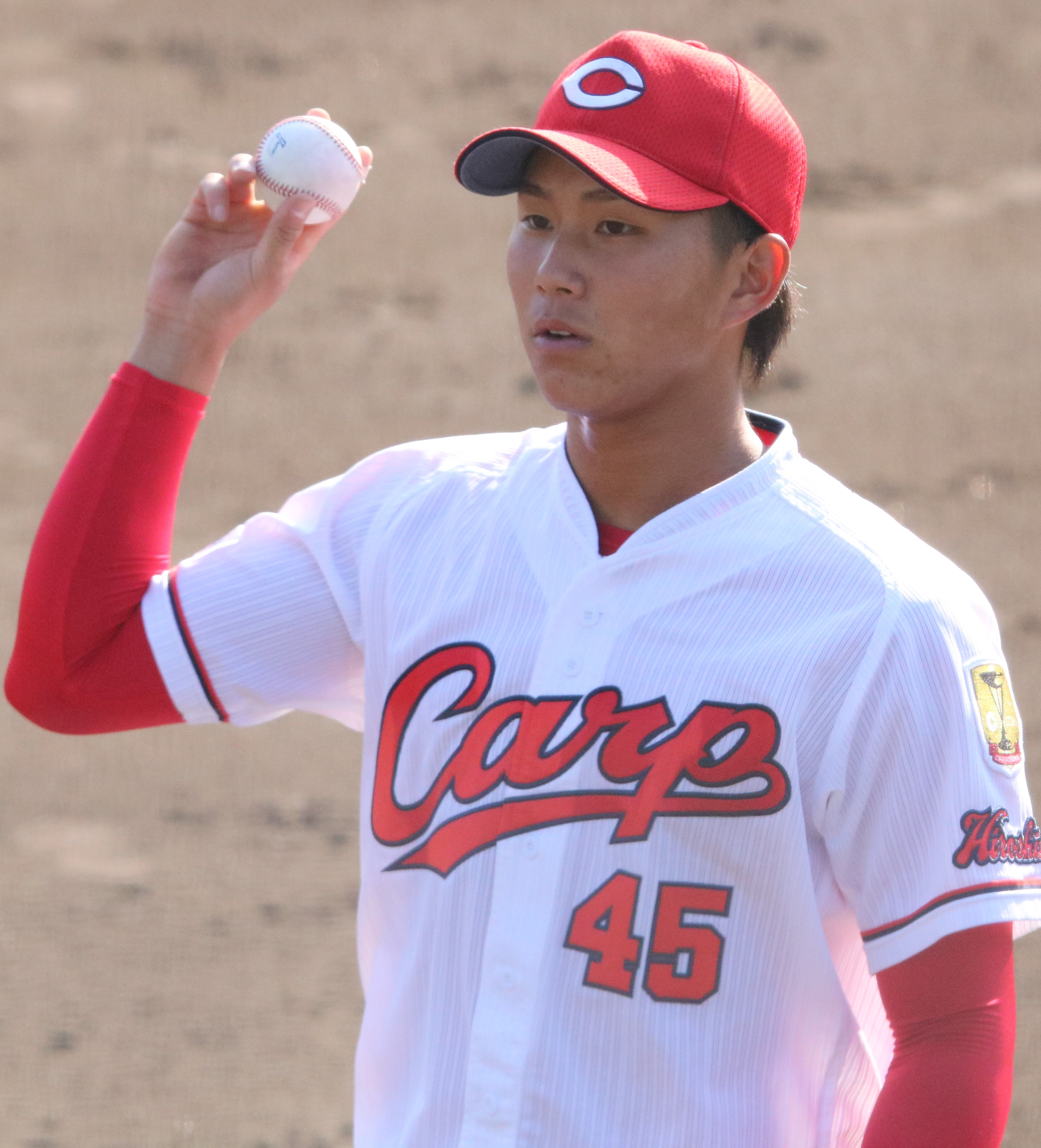
- Kuwahara in November 2017
- Infielder
- Born: July 4, 1996 (age 29); Kikugawa, Shizuoka Prefecture, Japan
- Batted: Left Threw: Right

NPB debut
- September 5, 2020, for the Hiroshima Toyo Carp

Last NPB appearance
- September 9, 2020, for the Hiroshima Toyo Carp

NPB statistics (through 2020 season)
- Games played: 3
- At-bats: 3
- Runs scored: 0

Teams
- Hiroshima Toyo Carp (2020)

Tatsuki Kuwahara (桒原 樹, Kuwahara Tatsuki; born July 4, 1996) is a Japanese former baseball player.

Kuwahara was selected from Tokoha Gakuen Kikukawa High School by the Hiroshima Toyo Carp in the 2014 Nippon Professional Baseball draft as the team's fifth pick. He played in the Western League for the Carp's affiliate team from 2014 to 2021. Kuwahara made his first-team debut on September 5, 2020, against the Yokohama DeNA BayStars. During the 2020 season, he played in three total games with the first-team, recording three at-bats and no hits.

On November 3, 2021, the Carp announced Kuwahara's release from the organization. He cited the emergence of younger players, such as Kota Hayashi and Kaito Kozono in his decision to retire as a player.
