= Yuya Oda =

Japanese baseball player (born 1989)

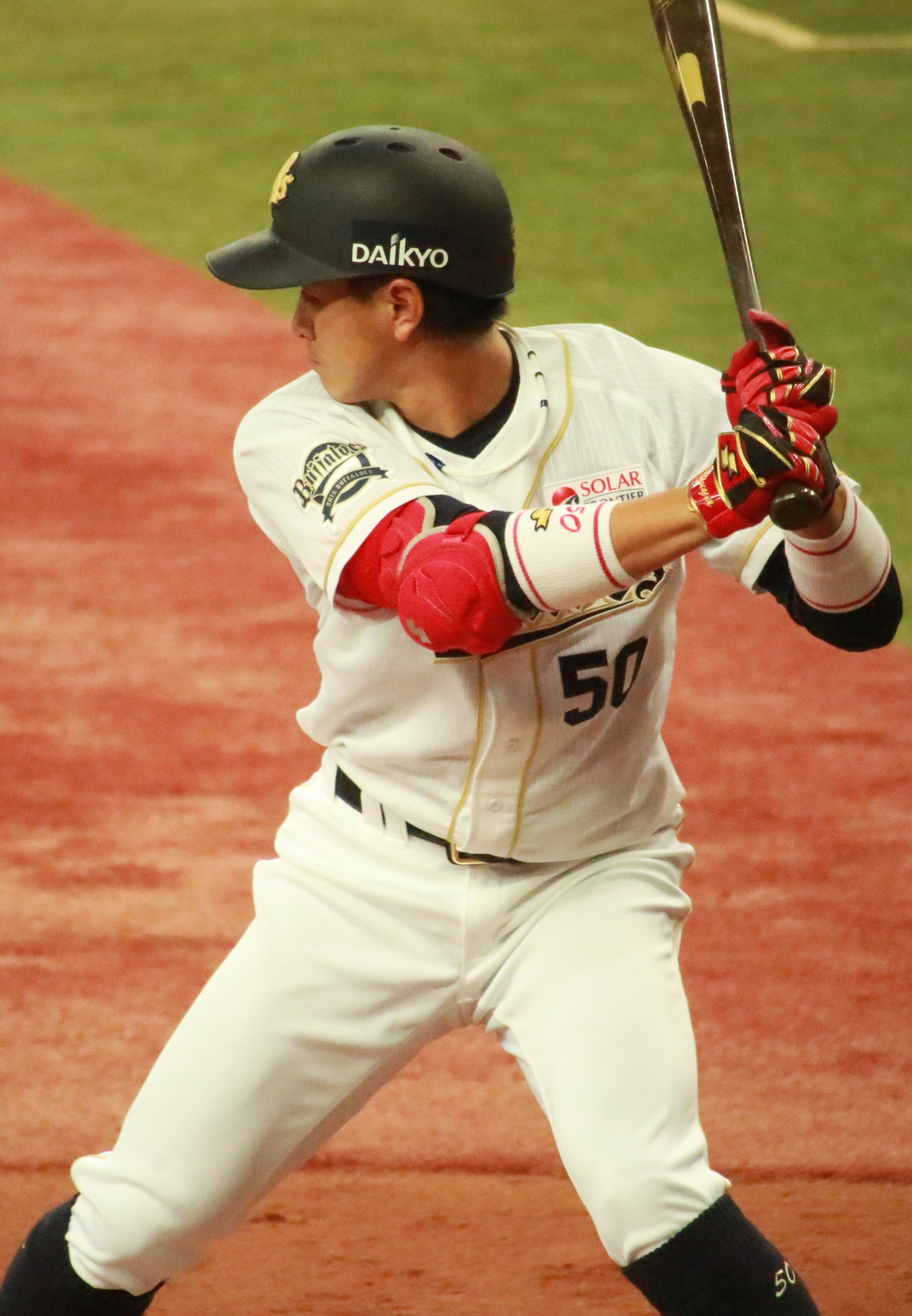
- Oda with the Orix Buffaloes

Orix Buffaloes – No. 90
- Outfielder / Coach
- Born: November 4, 1989 (age 36); Minamata, Kumamoto Prefecture, Japan
- Batted: Left Threw: Right

NPB debut
- August 5, 2015, for the Orix Buffaloes

Last NPB appearance
- September 24, 2024, for the Orix Buffaloes

NPB statistics
- Batting average: .239
- Home runs: 10
- RBI: 62
- Stats at Baseball Reference

Teams
- As player: Orix Buffaloes (2015–2024); As coach: Orix Buffaloes (2025–present)

Career highlights and awards
- Japan Series champion (2022)

Yuya Oda (小田 裕也, Oda Yuya; born November 4, 1989) is a Japanese former professional baseball outfielder. He played in Nippon Professional Baseball (NPB) from 2015 to 2024 for the Orix Buffaloes.

== Career ==
On September 16, 2024, Oda announced that he would be retiring following the conclusion of the season.
