= Kōki Yamashita =

Japanese baseball player (born 1993)

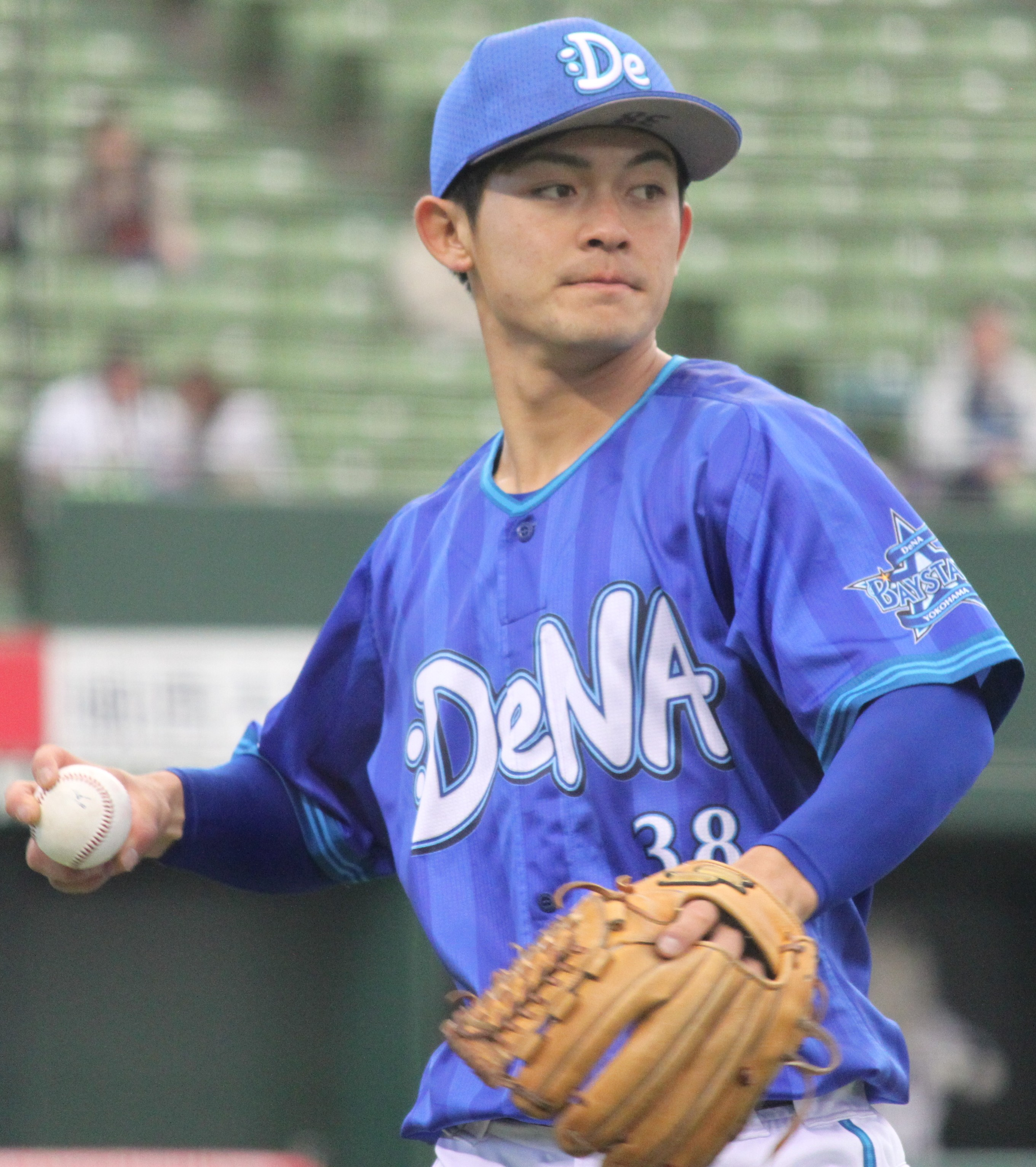
- Yamashita with the Yokohama DeNA BayStars
- Infielder
- Born: January 31, 1993 (age 33); Kimitsu, Chiba, Japan
- Batted: Right Threw: Right

debut
- March 27, 2015, for the Yokohama DeNA BayStars

Last appearance
- July 24, 2022, for the Yokohama DeNA BayStars

Career statistics (through 2022 season)
- Batting average: .210
- Home runs: 1
- Runs batted in: 18
- Stats at Baseball Reference

Teams
- Yokohama DeNA BayStars (2015–2022)

Kōki Yamashita (山下 幸輝, Yamashita Kōki; born January 31, 1993) is a professional Japanese baseball player. He plays infielder for the Yokohama DeNA BayStars.
