= Kōki Moriya =

Japanese baseball player (born 1993)

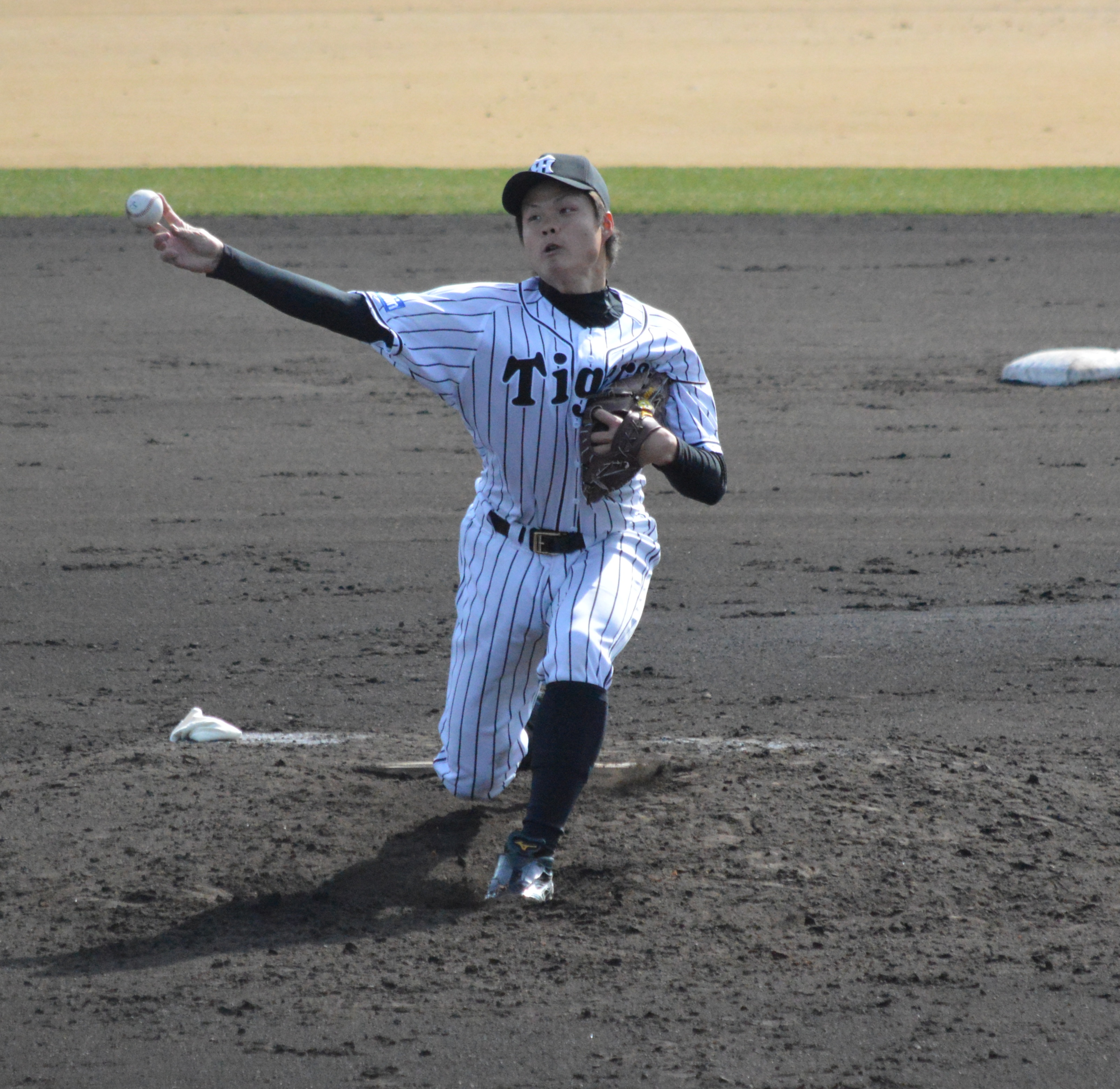
- Moriya with the Hanshin Tigers
- Pitcher
- Born: November 25, 1993 (age 32); Kurashiki, Okayama, Japan
- Batted: Right Threw: Right

NPB debut
- April 20, 2016, for the Hanshin Tigers

Last NPB appearance
- September 21, 2021, for the Hanshin Tigers

NPB statistics
- Win–loss record: 2–3
- Earned run average: 5.11
- Strikeouts: 68
- Stats at Baseball Reference

Teams
- Hanshin Tigers (2016–2022)

Kōki Moriya (守屋 功輝, Moriya,Kōki; born November 25, 1993) is a Japanese former professional baseball pitcher. He played in Nippon Professional Baseball (NPB) for the Hanshin Tigers from 2016 to 2021.

== Early baseball career ==
Kōki started playing little league baseball for the Tamashima Minami Elementary School and his team won runner up in the Okayama Prefectural Tournament during his 5th grade. He initially started as an outfielder, but switched to a pitching role when he played for Kurosaki Junior High. He went on to become the ace pitcher of Kurashiki Technical High, but his team never made it to either Spring Koshien or Summer Koshien.

When he went undrafted after graduation, he joined the Industrial Leagues under Honda Suzuka. He spent his first 2 years mostly in the dug out due to injuries, but in the succeeding year, he came to the rescue as a reliever in a crucial match against JR Tokai and helped his team reach the final round of the 2014 Intercity Baseball Tournament.

== Hanshin Tigers ==
He was chosen as the Hanshin Tigers' 4th round pick in the 2014 Nippon Professional Baseball draft. He signed a 50 million yen contract with the Tigers, with an estimated 8.4 million yen annual salary. He was assigned the jersey number 43.
