= Atsushi Miyazaki =

Japanese baseball player

- Pitcher
- Born: December 8, 1992 (age 33)
- Bats: Right Throws: Right

NPB debut
- 2016, for the Chiba Lotte Marines

NPB statistics (through 2017)
- Games pitched: 8
- ERA: 6.30
- Strikeouts: 9
- Stats at Baseball Reference

Teams
- Chiba Lotte Marines (2016–2017)

Atsushi Miyazaki (宮﨑 敦次, born December 8, 1992) is a Japanese former professional baseball pitcher who played for the Chiba Lotte Marines in Japan's Nippon Professional Baseball in 2016 and 2017.
