= Kyushu International University =

Private university in Yagata Higashi, Kitakyushu, Fukuoka Prefecture, Japan

Coordinates: 33°51′44″N 130°47′32″E

- 九州国際大学
- Type: private university
- Established: 1950
- Undergraduates: Law, Economics, International Studies
- Postgraduates: Law, Business and Environment
- Location: Kitakyushu, Fukuoka prefecture, Japan
- Website: http://www.kiu.ac.jp/

Kyushu International University (九州国際大学, Kyūshū kokusai daigaku) is a private university in Yahata Higashi, Kitakyushu, Fukuoka, Japan. The roots of the university can be found in the "Kyushu Law School", which was founded in 1930. The direct predecessor to the school, "Yahata University", was established in 1950, and it adopted the present name in 1989.

== History ==
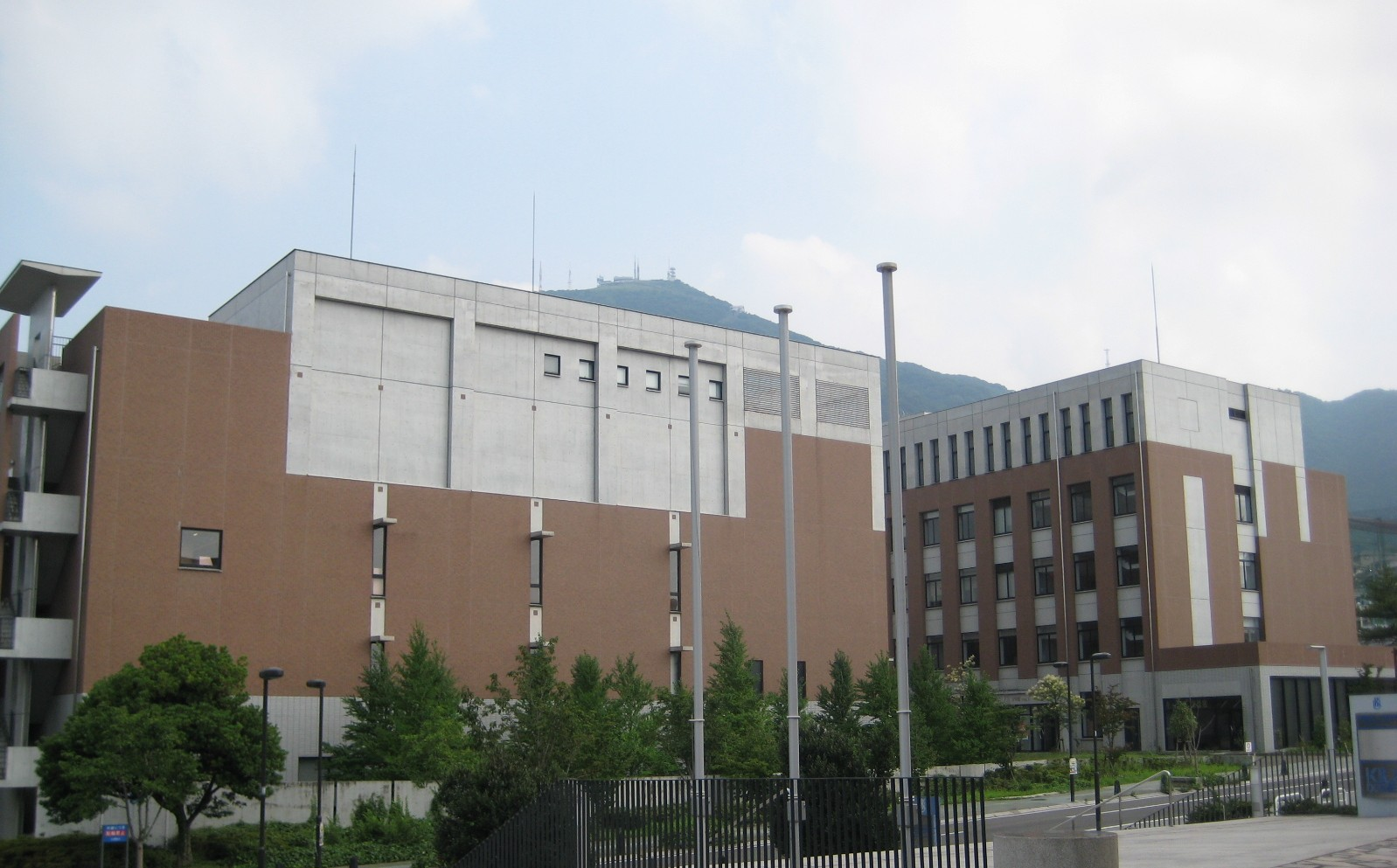
Kyushu International University

- 1930: Kyushu Law School (established)
- 1940: Kyushu College (renamed)
- 1947: Tobata College (renamed)
- 1949: Yahata College (renamed)
- 1950: Yahata University (reestablished)
- 1989: Kyushu International University (renamed)

== Faculties ==
- Law
- Economics
- International Studies (International Relations)

== Graduate Schools ==
- Law
- Business and Environment
