= Aomori Chuo Gakuin University =

Private university in Aomori, Aomori Prefecture, Japan

Coordinates: 40°47′01″N 140°45′43″E

- 青森中央学院大学
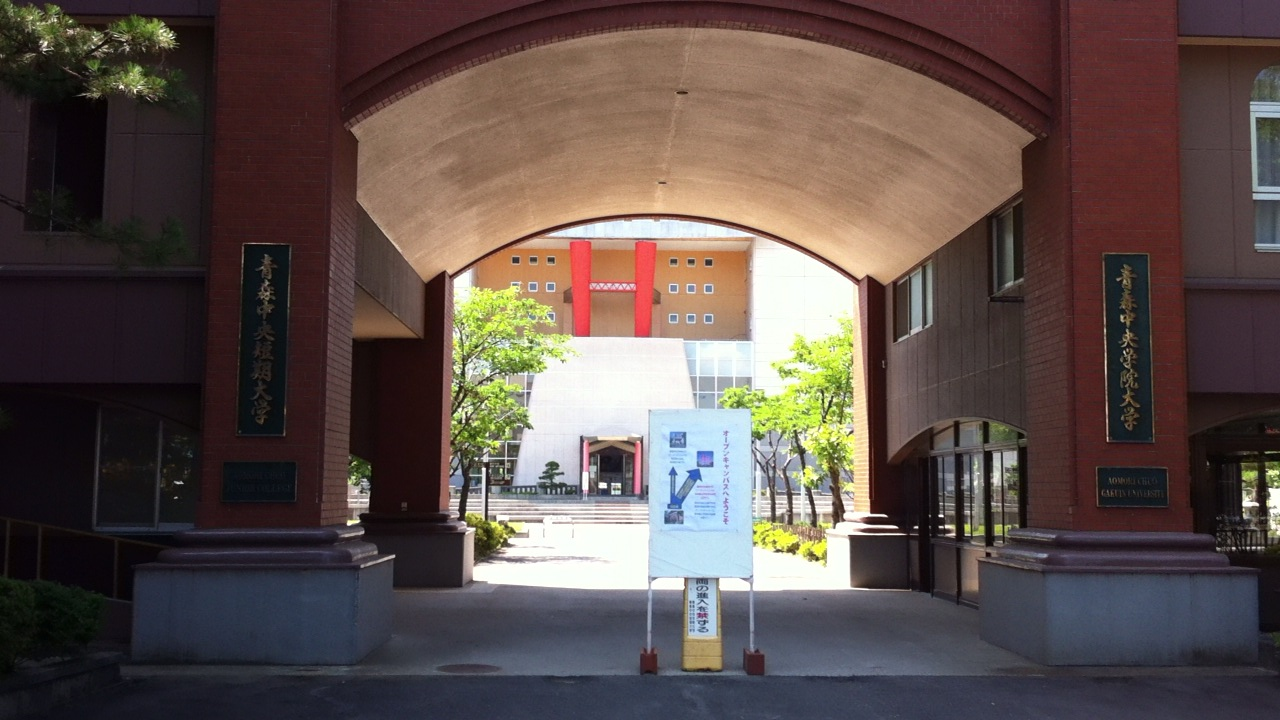
- Entrance
- Type: Private
- Established: 1946
- Location: Aomori, Aomori, Japan
- Website: Official website

Aomori Chuo Gakuin University (青森中央学院大学, Aomori Chūō Gakuin Daigaku) is a private university in the city of Aomori, Aomori Prefecture, Japan. The predecessor of the school was founded in 1946 as a junior college, and it became a four-year college in 1998.

The baseball team at Aomori Chūō Gakuin University plays in the Kita-Tõhoku University League.

== History ==
- 1964 - Aomori Tanaka Gakuen founded
- 1970 - Aomori Central Women's Junior College started
- 1998 - Aomori Central College starts school
- 2014 - Establishment of the Faculty of Nursing
- 2018 - Establishment of Midwifery specialization

== Departments ==
=== Faculties ===
- Department of Business Law
- Nursing discipline

=== College courses ===
- Specialise Regional Management Research
- Midwifery specialization
- Regional Management Institute
