= Hiroshima Kokusai Gakuin University =

University in Hiroshima Prefecture, Japan

Coordinates: 34°24′36″N 132°34′46″E

Hiroshima Kokusai Gakuin University (広島国際学院大学, Hiroshima kokusai gakuin daigaku) was a private university in Hiroshima, Hiroshima, Japan. The predecessor of the school was founded in 1927. It was chartered as a junior college in 1964 and became a four-year college in 1967. Recruitment ceased in 2020 due to declining student numbers and was abolished in 2023.
