= Kenta Ishida =

Japanese baseball player (born 1993)

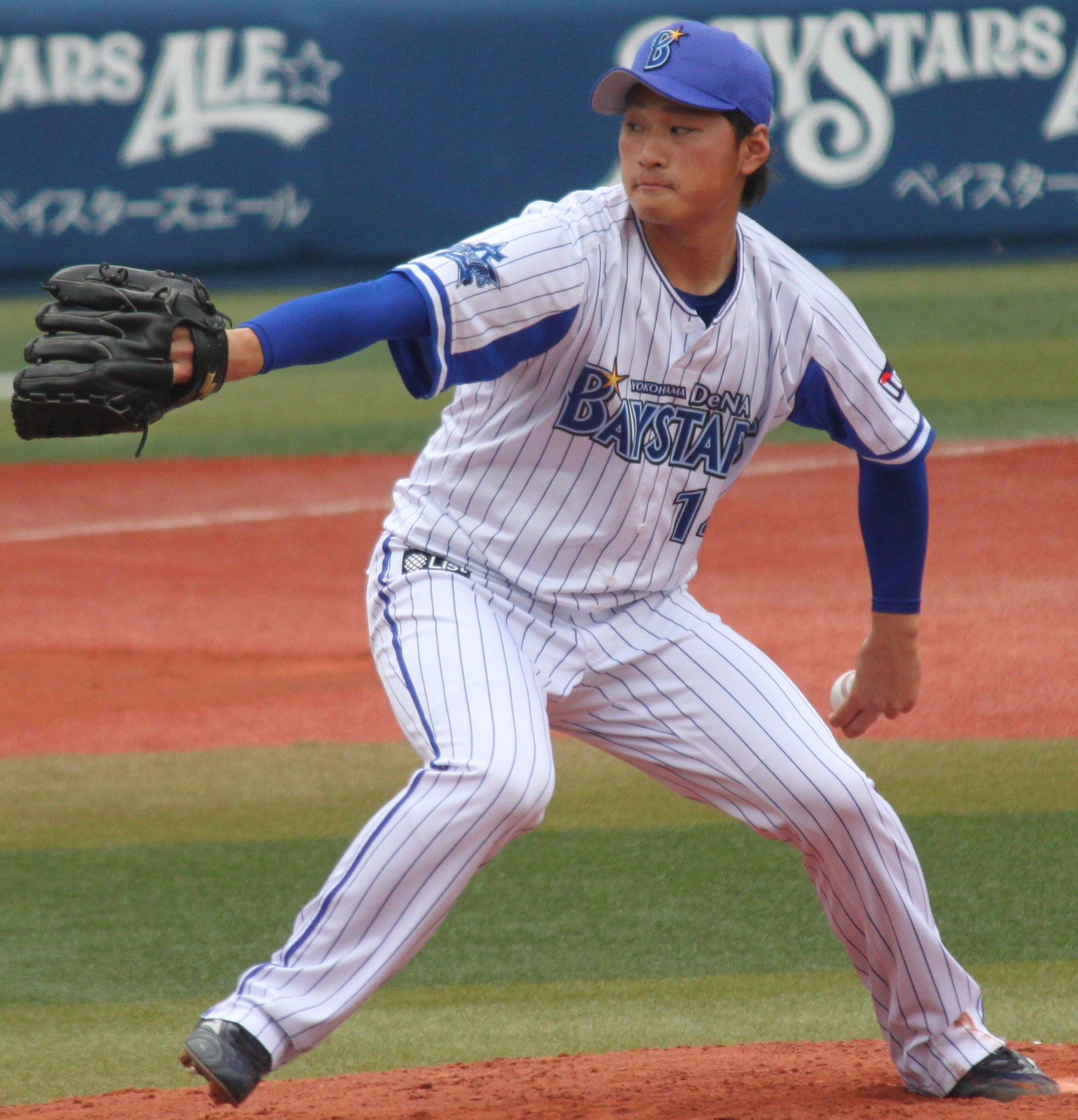
- Ishida with the Yokohama DeNA BayStars

Yokohama DeNA BayStars – No. 14
- Pitcher
- Born: March 1, 1993 (age 33); Hiroshima, Hiroshima, Japan
- Bats: Left Throws: Left

NPB debut
- July 14, 2015, for the Yokohama DeNA BayStars

Career statistics (through 2024 season)
- Win–loss record: 39-46
- Earned Run Average: 3.47
- Strikeouts: 734
- Saves: 0
- Holds: 37
- Stats at Baseball Reference

Teams
- Yokohama DeNA BayStars (2015–present)

Kenta Ishida (石田 健大, Ishida Kenta; born March 1, 1993) is a professional Japanese baseball pitcher for the Yokohama DeNA BayStars of Nippon Professional Baseball.
