= Motoharu Fukuchi =

Japanese baseball player (born 1990)

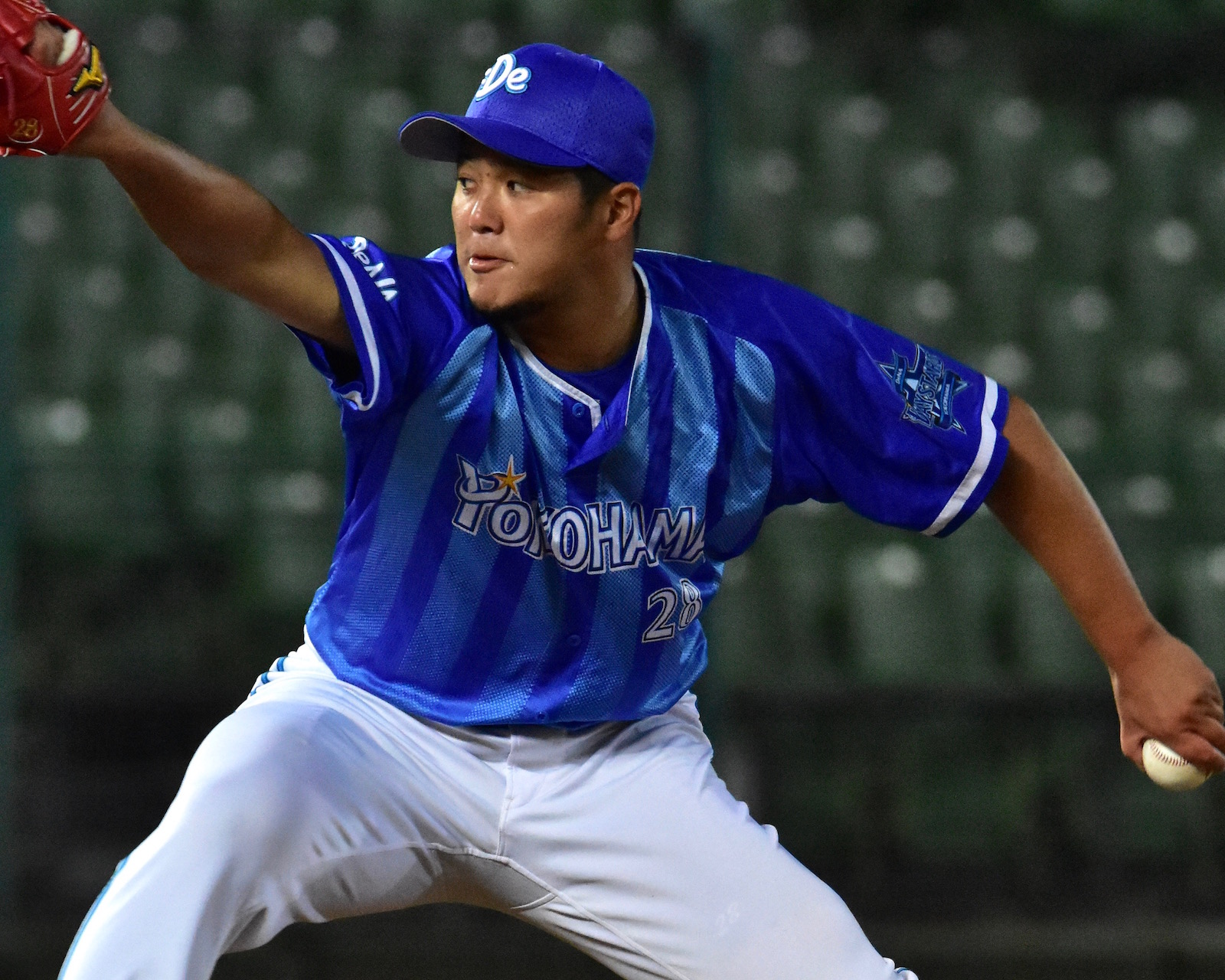
- Fukuchi with the Yokohama DeNA BayStars

Free agent
- Pitcher
- Born: June 21, 1990 (age 35); Nago, Okinawa, Japan
- Bats: Left Throws: Left

debut
- June 28, 2015, for the Yokohama DeNA BayStars

Career statistics (through 2018)
- Win–loss record: 0–1
- Earned run average: 5.64
- Strikeouts: 21

Teams
- Yokohama DeNA BayStars (2015–2018); Shinano Grandserows (2019-2020); Ryukyu BLUE OCEANS (2021); Oita B-Rings (2022-present)

Motoharu Fukuchi (福地 元春, Fukuchi Motoharu; born June 21, 1990 in Nago, Okinawa, Japan) is a professional Japanese baseball player who is currently a free agent. He previously played pitcher for the Yokohama DeNA BayStars.
