= Satoshi Iizuka =

Japanese baseball player

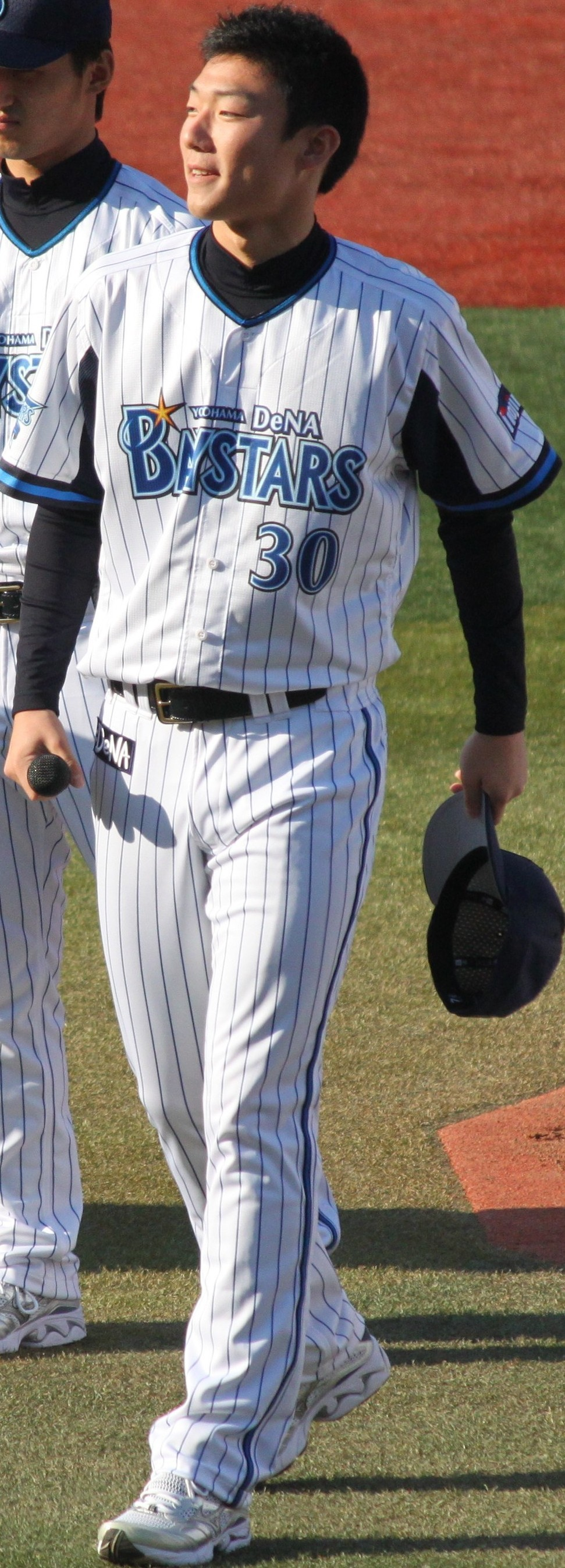
- Pitcher
- Born: October 11, 1996 (age 29); Jōetsu, Niigata, Japan
- Batted: Left Threw: Right

NPB debut
- June 19, 2017, for the Yokohama DeNA BayStars

Last NPB appearance
- August 4, 2019, for the Yokohama DeNA BayStars

Career statistics (through 2020 season)
- Win–loss record: 2–10
- Earned run average: 5.29
- Strikeouts: 70
- Stats at Baseball Reference

Teams
- Yokohama DeNA BayStars (2015–2021)

Satoshi Iizuka (飯塚 悟史, Iizuka Satoshi; born July 12, 1993 in Jōetsu, Niigata, Japan) is a professional Japanese baseball player. He plays pitcher for the Yokohama DeNA BayStars.

- Career statistics from Baseball Reference (Minors)
- NPB.com
