= Yūshi Shimizu =

Japanese baseball player (born 1996)

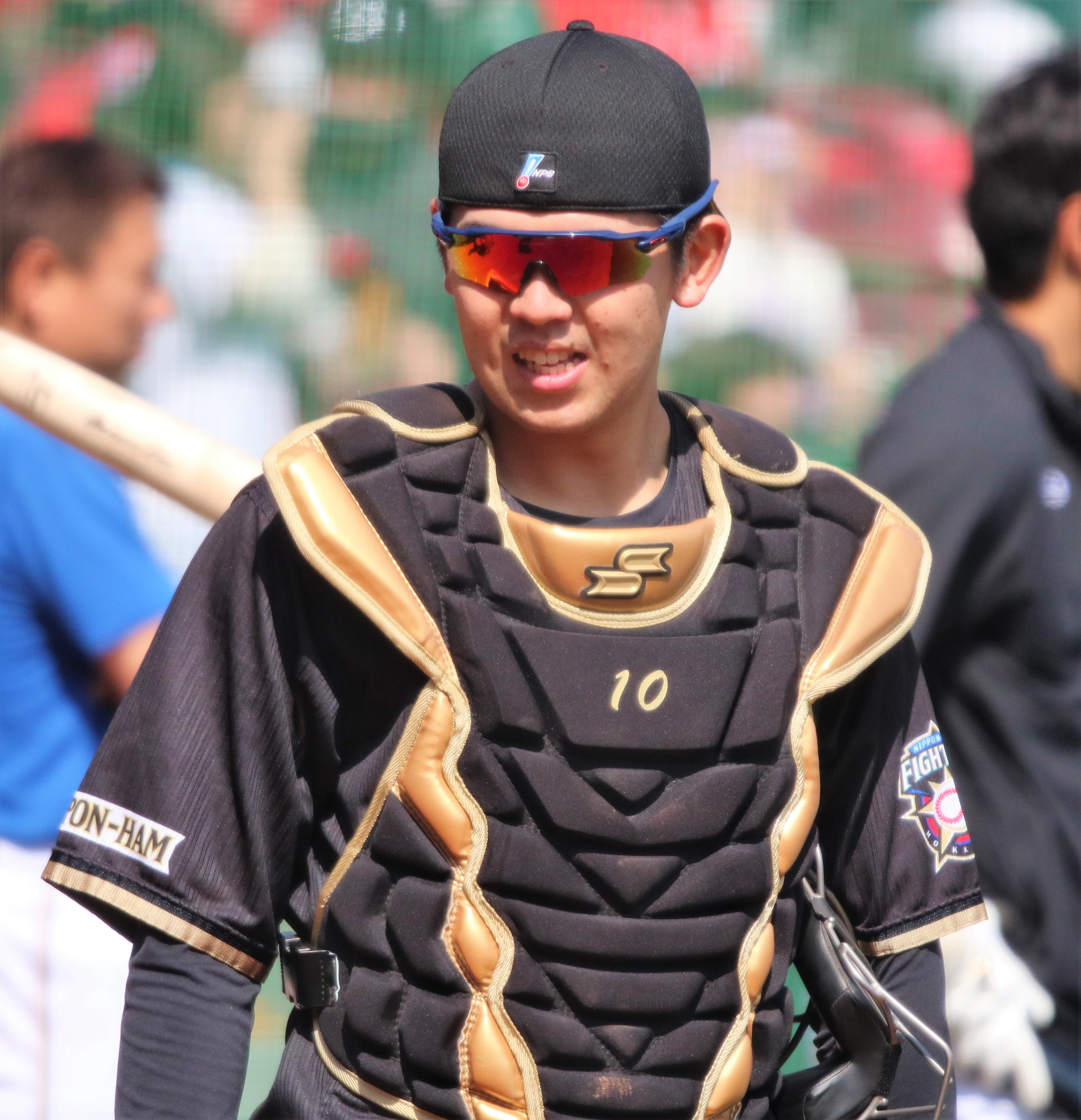

Hokkaido Nippon Ham Fighters – No. 10
- Catcher
- Born: May 22, 1996 (age 29); Ōshima District, Yamaguchi, Japan
- Bats: Right Throws: Right

debut
- October 1, 2015, for the Hokkaido Nippon-Ham Fighters

Career statistics (through 2020 season)
- Batting average: .222
- Home runs: 16
- Runs batted in: 71
- Stats at Baseball Reference

Teams
- Hokkaido Nippon-Ham Fighters (2015–present)

Yūshi Shimizu (清水 優心, Shimizu Yūshi; born May 22, 1996 in Ōshima District, Yamaguchi, Japan) is a professional Japanese baseball player. He plays catcher for the Hokkaido Nippon-Ham Fighters.
