= Masayoshi Fukuda =

Japanese baseball player (born 1992)

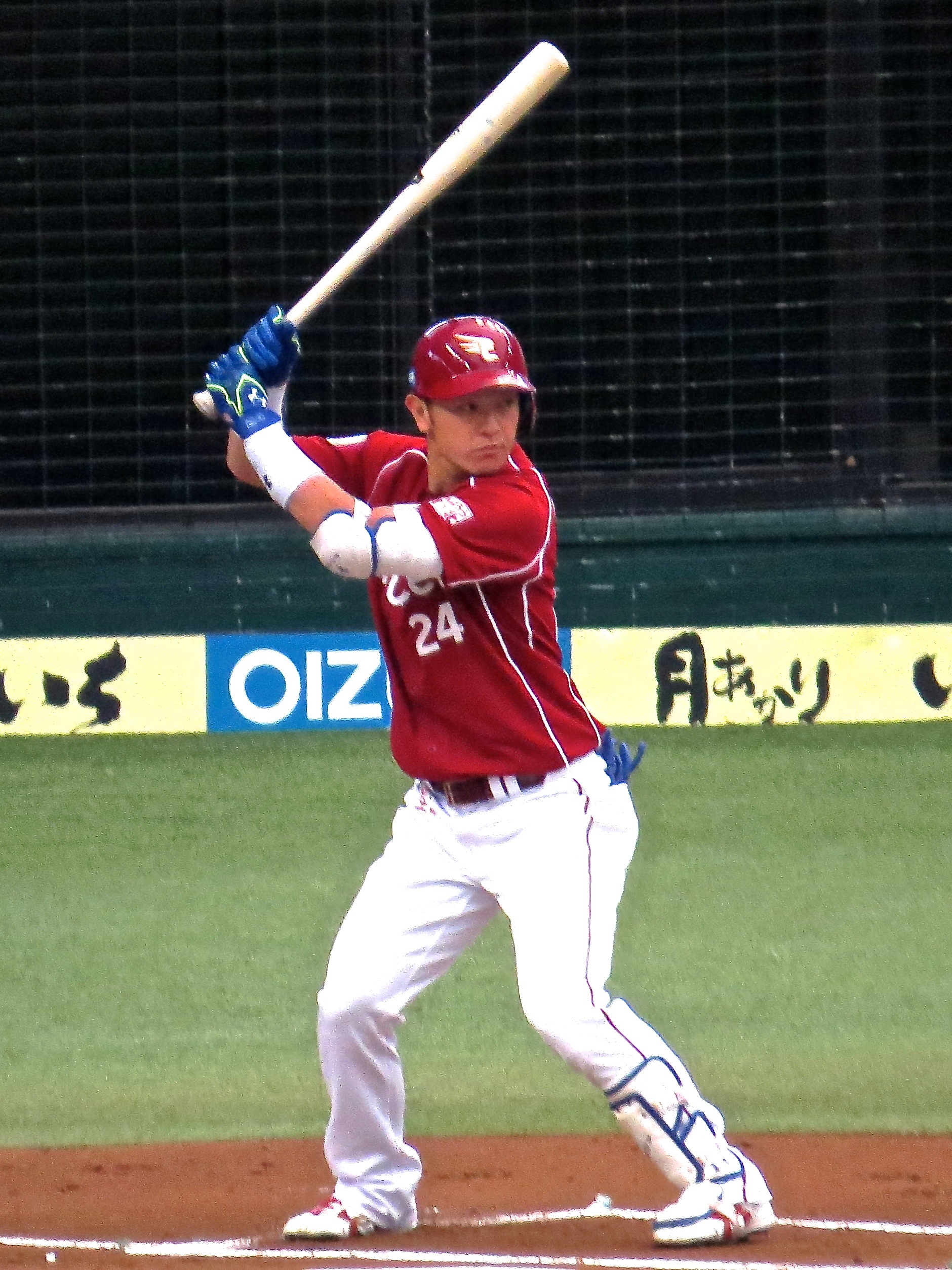
- Fukuda with the Tohoku Rakuten Golden Eagles
- Outfielder
- Born: April 17, 1992 (age 34)
- Bats: Right Throws: Right

NPB debut
- 2015, for the Tohoku Rakuten Golden Eagles

NPB statistics (through 2017)
- Batting average: .210
- Home runs: 3
- RBI: 21
- Stats at Baseball Reference

Teams
- Tohoku Rakuten Golden Eagles (2015–2017)

Masayoshi Fukuda (福田 将儀, born April 17, 1992, in Sanmu, Chiba Prefecture) is a Japanese former professional baseball outfielder in Japan's Nippon Professional Baseball. He played for the Tohoku Rakuten Golden Eagles from 2015 to 2017.
