= Fumiya Ono =

Japanese baseball player (born 1996)

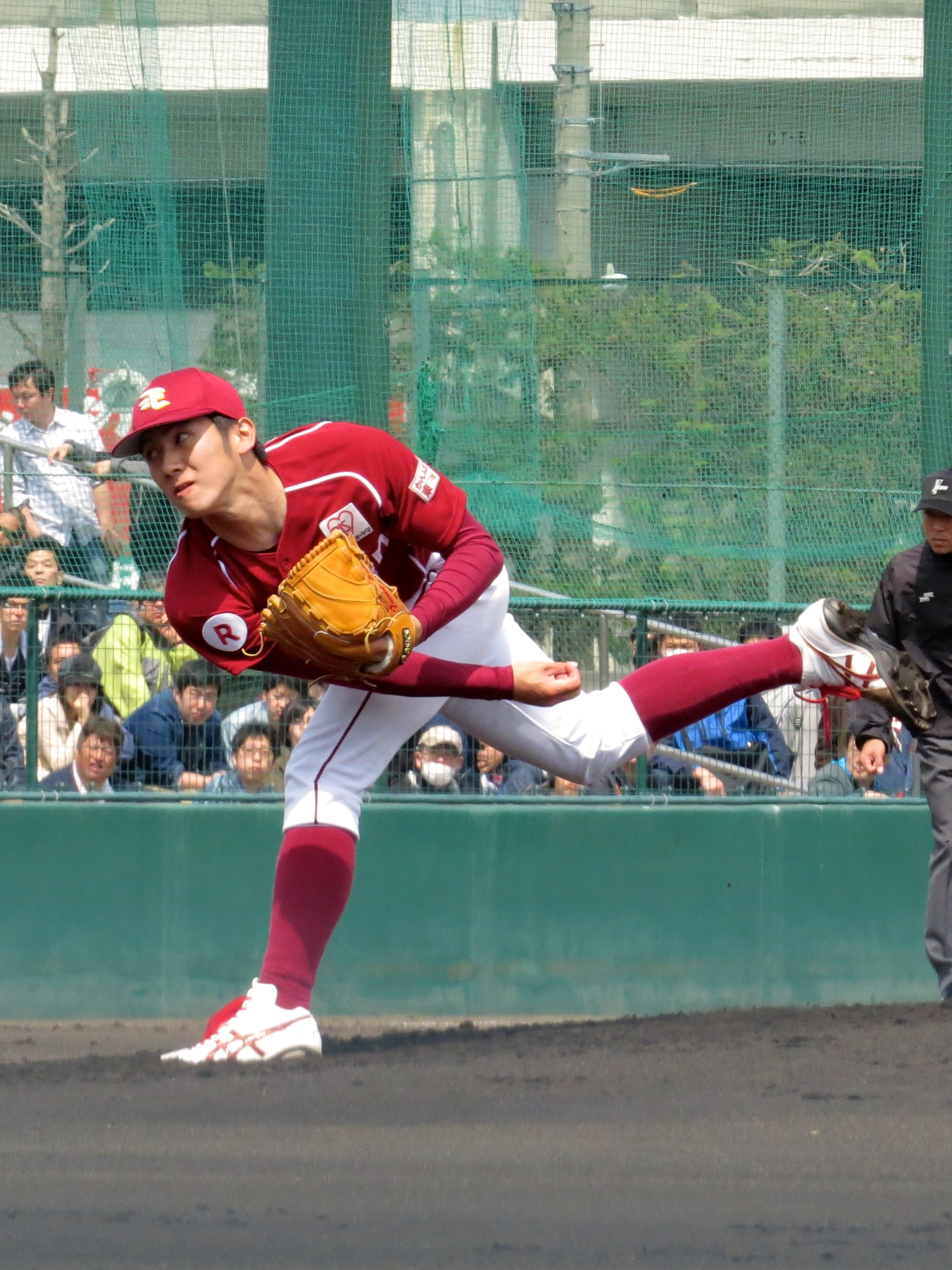
- Ono with the Tohoku Rakuten Golden Eagles

Chiba Lotte Marines – No. 37
- Pitcher
- Born: October 23, 1996 (age 29); Kurume, Fukuoka, Japan
- Bats: Right Throws: Right

NPB debut
- August 19, 2015, for the Tohoku Rakuten Golden Eagles

NPB statistics (through 2024 season)
- Win–loss record: 2–7
- ERA: 4.14
- Strikeouts: 159
- Saves: 0
- Holds: 34

Teams
- Tohoku Rakuten Golden Eagles (2015-2019); Chiba Lotte Marines (2020-present)

Career highlights and awards
- 1x NPB All-Star (2022)

Fumiya Ono (小野 郁, Ono Fumiya; born October 23, 1996) is a Japanese professional baseball pitcher for the Chiba Lotte Marines of the Nippon Professional Baseball (NPB). He previously played for the Tohoku Rakuten Golden Eagles.

== Career ==
On December 19, 2019, he was sent to Chiba Lotte Marines as compensation for Daichi Suzuki, who signed with Rakuten as a free agent after the 2019 NPB season He was named an NPB All-Star in 2022.
