= Takayoshi Noma =

Japanese baseball player (born 1993)

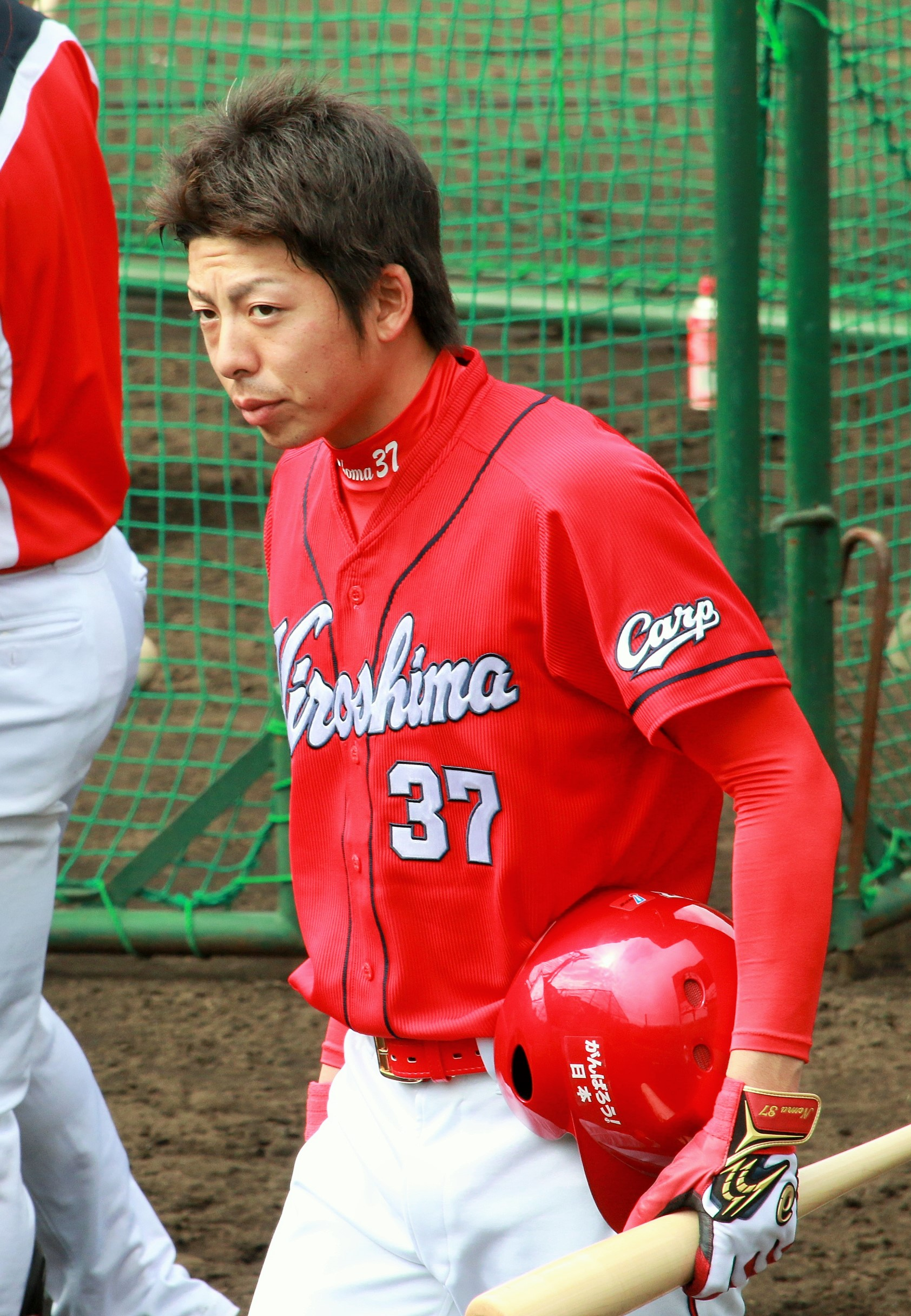
- Noma with the Hiroshima Toyo Carp

Hiroshima Toyo Carp – No. 37
- Outfielder
- Born: January 28, 1993 (age 33); Miki, Hyōgo, Japan
- Bats: Left Throws: Right

NPB debut
- March 27, 2015, for the Hiroshima Toyo Carp

NPB statistics (through 2021 season)
- Batting average: .261
- Home runs: 10
- Runs batted in: 88
- Stolen Bases: 61
- Stats at Baseball Reference

Teams
- Hiroshima Toyo Carp (2015–present)

Takayoshi Noma (野間 峻祥, Noma Takayoshi; born January 28, 1993 in Miki, Hyōgo, Japan) is a Japanese professional baseball player for the Hiroshima Toyo Carp of Nippon Professional Baseball (NPB).

On February 27, 2019, he was selected for Japan national baseball team at the 2019 exhibition games against Mexico.

He uses Dragostea Din Tei by Moldovan pop group O-Zone as his walk-up song, because "Numa Numa" in the lyrics sounds like "Noma Noma" to Japanese people.
