= Masashi Yamamoto (baseball) =

Japanese baseball player

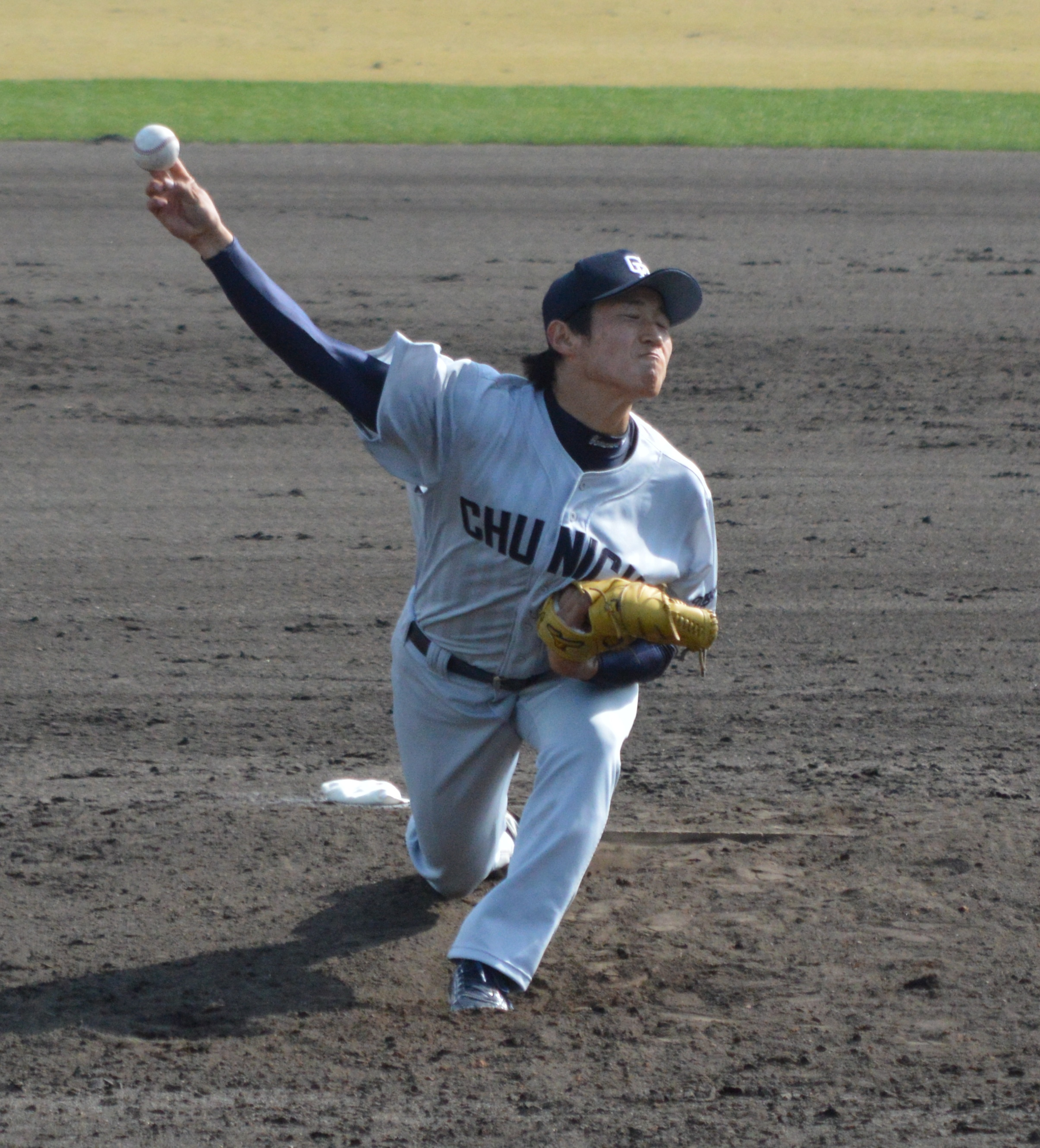
- Yamamoto with the Chunichi Dragons

Kanagawa Future Dreams – No. 37
- Pitcher
- Born: November 3, 1994 (age 31); Hiroshima, Hiroshima, Japan
- Bats: Left Throws: Right

NPB debut
- August 13, 2015, for the Chunichi Dragons

NPB statistics (through 2015)
- Win–loss record: 0 – 0
- ERA: 10.38
- Strikeouts: 2

Teams
- Chunichi Dragons (2015–2018)

Masashi Yamamoto (山本 雅士, Yamamoto Masashi; born November 3, 1994 in Hiroshima, Hiroshima, Japan) is a Japanese professional baseball pitcher for the Kanagawa Future Dreams of the Baseball Challenge League (BCL). He has previously played in Nippon Professional Baseball (NPB) for the Chunichi Dragons.

== Career ==
On 28 October 2016, it was announced that Yamamoto would be taking a pay cut for the 2017 season and being moved on to a trainee contract.
