= Kengo Ohta =

Japanese baseball player (born 1997)

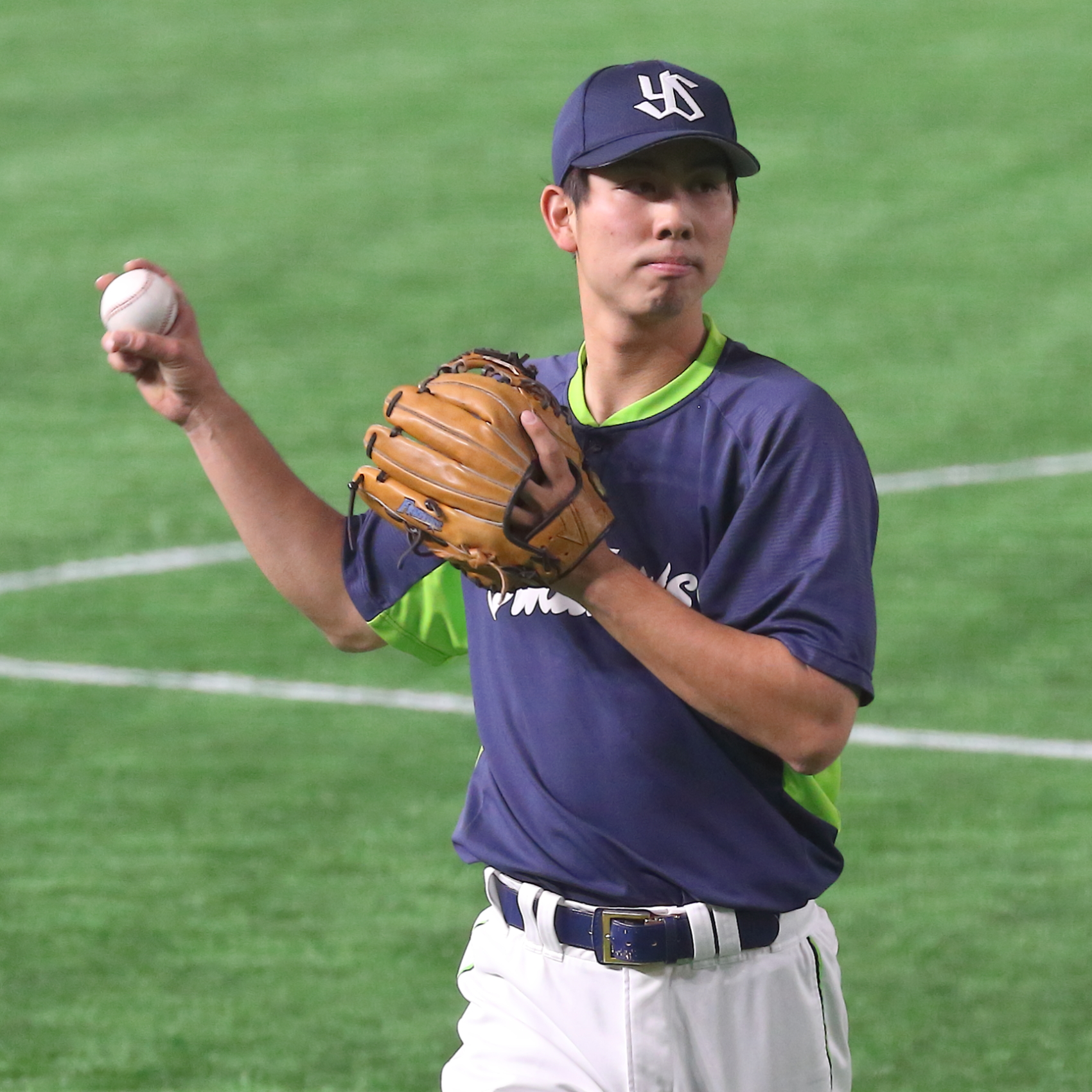
- Infielder / Outfielder
- Born: January 19, 1997 (age 29); Kawagoe, Saitama, Japan
- Batted: Left Threw: Right

NPB debut
- July 18, 2017, for the Hokkaido Nippon-Ham Fighters

Last NPB appearance
- October 2, 2025, for the Tokyo Yakult Swallows

Career statistics
- Batting average: .231
- Hits: 190
- Home runs: 5
- Runs batted in: 63
- Stolen bases: 3
- Stats at Baseball Reference

Teams
- Hokkaido Nippon-Ham Fighters (2015–2018); Tokyo Yakult Swallows (2019–2025)

Kengo Ohta (太田 賢吾, Ohta, Kengo; born January 19, 1997) is a professional Japanese baseball player. He plays infielder for the Tokyo Yakult Swallows.
