= Kodai Sano (baseball) =

Japanese baseball player (born 1996)

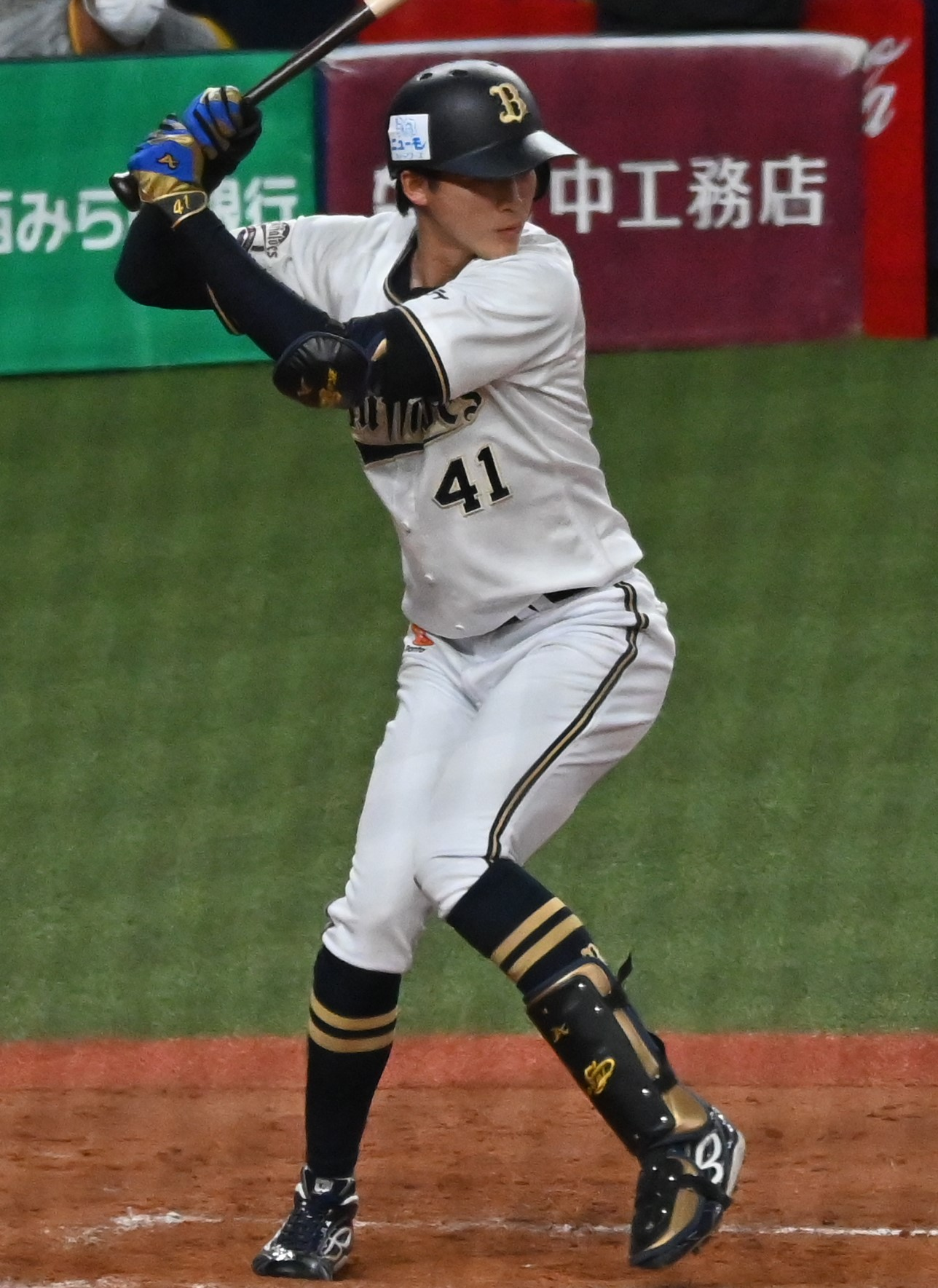

Orix Buffaloes – No. 41
- Outfielder
- Born: September 2, 1996 (age 29); Saiki, Ōita, Japan
- Bats: Switch Throws: Right

NPB debut
- October 5, 2018, for the Orix Buffaloes

Career statistics (through 2023 season)
- Batting average: .200
- Hits: 97
- Home runs: 5
- Runs batted in: 26
- Stolen bases: 50

Teams
- Orix Buffaloes (2018-present)

Career highlights and awards
- Japan Series champion (2022)

Kodai Sano (佐野 皓大, Sano Kodai; born September 2, 1996) is a professional Japanese baseball player. He is an outfielder for the Orix Buffaloes of Nippon Professional Baseball (NPB).
