= Shogo Nakamura (baseball) =

Japanese baseball player (born 1992)

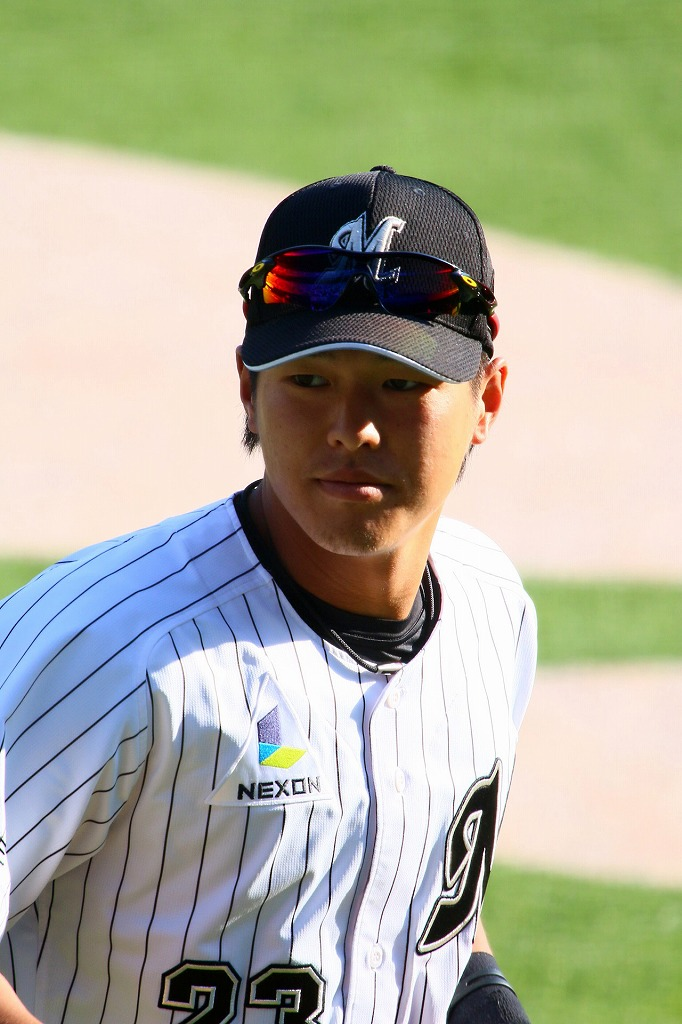
- Nakamura with the Chiba Lotte Marines

Chiba Lotte Marines – No. 8
- Infielder
- Born: May 28, 1992 (age 34); Miki, Hyōgo, Japan
- Bats: Right Throws: Right

debut
- March 29, 2015, for the Chiba Lotte Marines

NPB statistics (through 2021 season)
- Batting average: .255
- Home runs: 62
- RBI: 310
- Stats at Baseball Reference

Teams
- Chiba Lotte Marines (2015–present)

Career highlights and awards
- Best Nine Award (2021); 2x NPB All-Star (2018, 2021); 2× Pacific League Golden Glove Award (2018, 2021)

Shogo Nakamura (中村 奨吾, Nakamura Shōgo; born May 28, 1992 in Miki, Hyōgo, Japan), nicknamed "Brave Man", is a professional Japanese baseball player. He plays infielder for the Chiba Lotte Marines.

== Career ==
He was selected 2018 NPB All-Star game.

On February 27, 2019, he was selected for Japan national baseball team at the 2019 exhibition games against Mexico.
