= Yasuaki Yamasaki =

Japanese baseball player (born 1992)

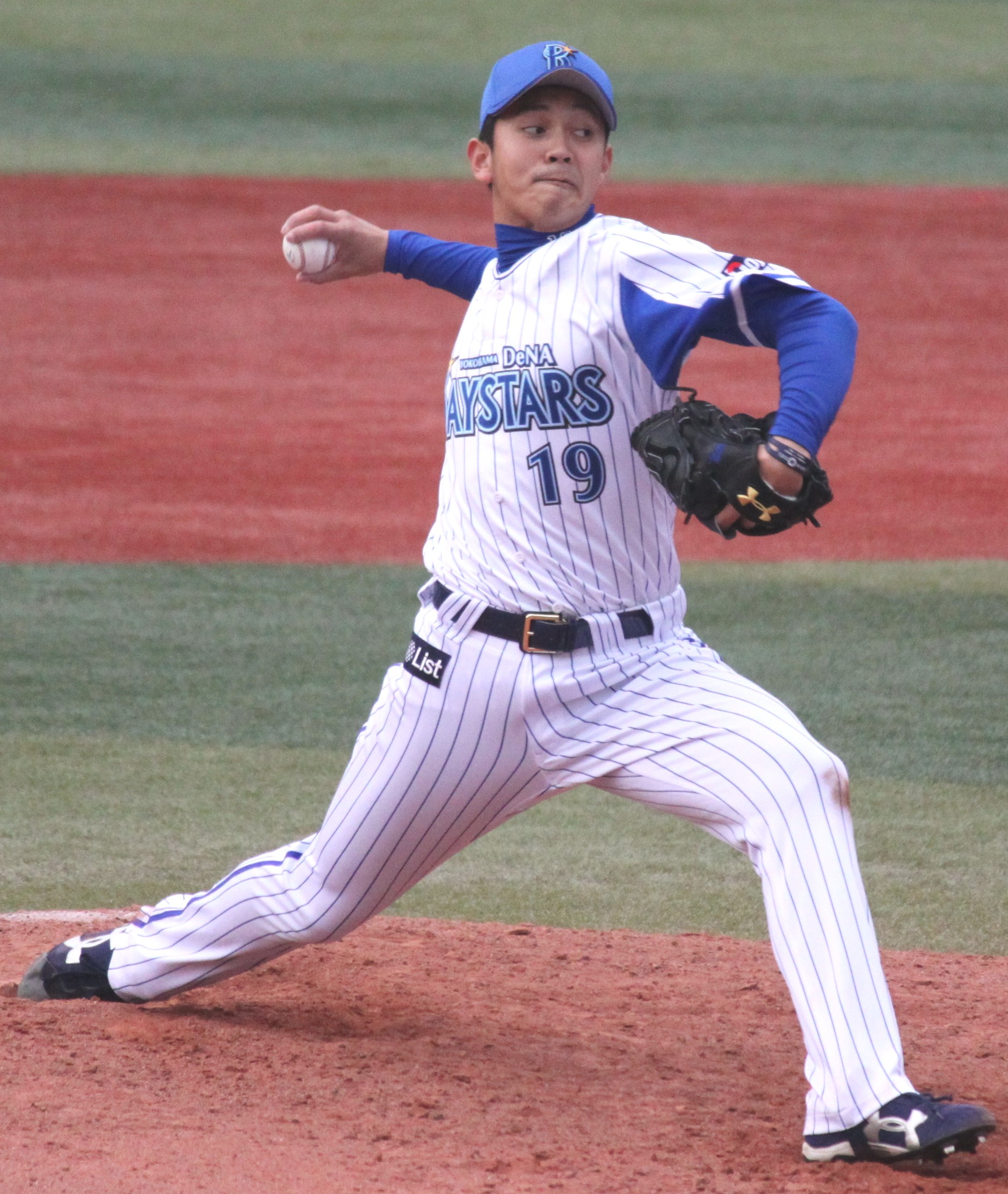
- Yamasaki with the Yokohama DeNA BayStars

Yokohama DeNA BayStars – No. 19
- Pitcher
- Born: October 2, 1992 (age 33); Arakawa, Tokyo, Japan
- Bats: Right Throws: Right

NPB debut
- March 28, 2015, for the Yokohama DeNA BayStars

Career statistics (through 2023)
- Win–loss Record: 19-31
- Earned Run Average: 2.78
- Strikeouts: 494
- Saves: 227
- Stats at Baseball Reference

Teams
- Yokohama DeNA BayStars (2015–present)

Career highlights and awards
- Japan Series champion (2024); 7× NPB All-Star (2015–2019, 2021, 2023); 2015 Central League Rookie of the Year
Medals
Men's baseball
Representing Japan
Summer Olympics
Gold medal – first place	2020 Tokyo	Team
2015 WBSC Premier12
Bronze medal – third place	2015 Tokyo	Team
Gold medal – first place	2019 Tokyo	Team

Yasuaki Yamasaki (山崎 康晃, Yamasaki Yasuaki; born October 2, 1992 in Arakawa, Tokyo) is a Japanese professional baseball pitcher for the Yokohama DeNA BayStars of Nippon Professional Baseball (NPB).

== Career ==
Yamasaki was drafted with the first pick by the Yokohama DeNA BayStars in 2014 Nippon Professional Baseball draft. He has been selected as an all-star five times in his career.

== International career ==
Yamasaki was selected for the Japan national baseball team at the 2015 WBSC Premier12.

On August 20, 2018, he was selected to be on the Samurai Japan Roster for the 2018 MLB Japan All-Star Series.

On February 27, 2019, he was selected for the Japan national baseball team at the 2019 exhibition games against Mexico.

On October 1, 2019, he was again selected for the Japan national team at the 2019 WBSC Premier12.

== Personal life ==
Yamasaki has a Japanese father and a Filipino mother.
