= 2025 Pacific League Climax Series =

Japanese baseball series

First stage
Team (Wins)		Manager	Season
Hokkaido Nippon-Ham Fighters (2)		Tsuyoshi Shinjo	83–57–3 (.593), 4½ GB
Orix Buffaloes (0)		Mamoru Kishida	74–66–3 (.529), 13½ GB
- Dates: October 11–12

Final stage
Team (Wins)		Manager	Season
Fukuoka SoftBank Hawks (4)		Hiroki Kokubo	87–52–4 (.626), 4½ GA
Hokkaido Nippon-Ham Fighters (3)		Tsuyoshi Shinjo	83–57–3 (.593), 4½ GB
- Dates: October 15–20
- MVP: Liván Moinelo (SoftBank)

The 2025 Pacific League Climax Series was a set of two consecutive playoff series between the three top-placing teams in Nippon Professional Baseball's Pacific League (PL). The first stage started on October 11 and the final stage concluded on October 20. The first stage was a best-of-three series between the second-place Hokkaido Nippon-Ham Fighters and the third-place Orix Buffaloes. The final stage was a best-of-six series with the Fukuoka SoftBank Hawks, the PL champion, being awarded a one-win advantage against the Hokkaido Nippon-Ham Fighters, the winner of the first stage. The Fukuoka SoftBank Hawks avoided getting reverse swept to advance to the 2025 Japan Series, competing against the winner of the 2025 Central League Climax Series, the Hanshin Tigers.

== Background ==
For the eighth consecutive year, Persol Holdings sponsored the naming rights for the Pacific League Climax Series, and it was officially known as the "2025 Persol Climax Series PA".

The Fukuoka SoftBank Hawks clinched their second straight Pacific League (PL) championship and 21st overall on September 17 with only four games remaining in the season. Unlike 2024 in which they occupied first place for the majority of the season, the Hawks' 2025 campaign started poorly. The team fell as low as seven games under .500 by early May and found itself last in the PL, six games behind first. Injuries to key players Yuki Yanagita, Kensuke Kondoh, Ryoya Kurihara, Ukyo Shuto, and Kenta Imamiya contributed to SoftBank's slow start and forced manager Hiroki Kokubo to dip into the team's depth early to give new players an opportunity to cover for the injured veterans. After April, the team bounced back and won at least 14 games in each of the next five months. They won interleague play in June, first moved into the top spot in the PL in late July, and secured first place for good in early August. Outfielder Tatsuru Yanagimachi won the interleague Most Valuable Player (MVP) award and contended for the PL batting title all year, ultimately coming in second to teammate Taisei Makihara who finished with a .304 batting average. Both are contenders for PL MVP. Hawks' pitching also excelled throughout the season. Three of their starting pitchers accumulated at least 140 innings pitched and earned run averages (ERA) of 2.78 or lower, four had at least 12 wins, and Liván Moinelo led NPB with a 1.46 ERA. Relief pitcher Kazuki Sugiyama also led the league in saves. Ukyo Shuto stole the most bases for the third straight season.

For the second straight season, the Hokkaido Nippon-Ham Fighters finished in second place behind SoftBank, however they considerably narrowed the gap between the teams compared to the previous season. In his fourth year as manager, Tsuyoshi Shinjo kept Fighters in first place for most of the first half of the season with good pitching and a strong offensive lineup. By the end of the season, they led all of NPB in complete games pitched and home runs. Franmil Reyes led the PL in home runs and runs batted in (RBIs), with 32 and 90, respectively. Despite being overtaken by SoftBank in the second half, Nippon-Ham secured a Climax Series berth on September 14. Starter Hiromi Itoh tied for the most wins in the PL and also finished the season with the most strikeouts. He would go on to be awarded the Sawamura Award, the team's first since Yu Darvish 18 years prior. They continued to battle the first-place Hawks for the PL championship through September and kept the pennant race close but ultimately came up short. The Fighters surpassed 80 wins for the first time since the 2016 season, the last time the team won the PL or the Japan Series.

On the same day that SoftBank secured the PL pennant, the Orix Buffaloes defeated the Tohoku Rakuten Golden Eagles to secure third-place, a Climax Series berth, and a winning record. First-year manager Mamoru Kishida led the team back to the playoffs for the first time since 2023.

== First stage ==
Intra-league teams play 25 games against each other during the regular season. The Hokkaido Nippon-Ham Fighters and the Orix Buffaloes split their season series 12–12–1, however the Fighters finished nine games ahead of the Buffaloes. The two teams had only met in the postseason two times prior to this year, with Nippon-Ham winning both series. A best-of-three series, all games in the first stage were hosted by Nippon-Ham, the higher seeded team, at their home ballpark, Es Con Field Hokkaido.

=== Summary ===
Nippon-Ham won the series, 2–0.

Game	Date	Score	Location	Time	Attendance
1	October 11	Orix Buffaloes – 0, Hokkaido Nippon-Ham Fighters – 2	Es Con Field Hokkaido	2:52	34,165
2	October 12	Orix Buffaloes – 4, Hokkaido Nippon-Ham Fighters – 5	Es Con Field Hokkaido	3:20	35,024

=== Game 1 ===
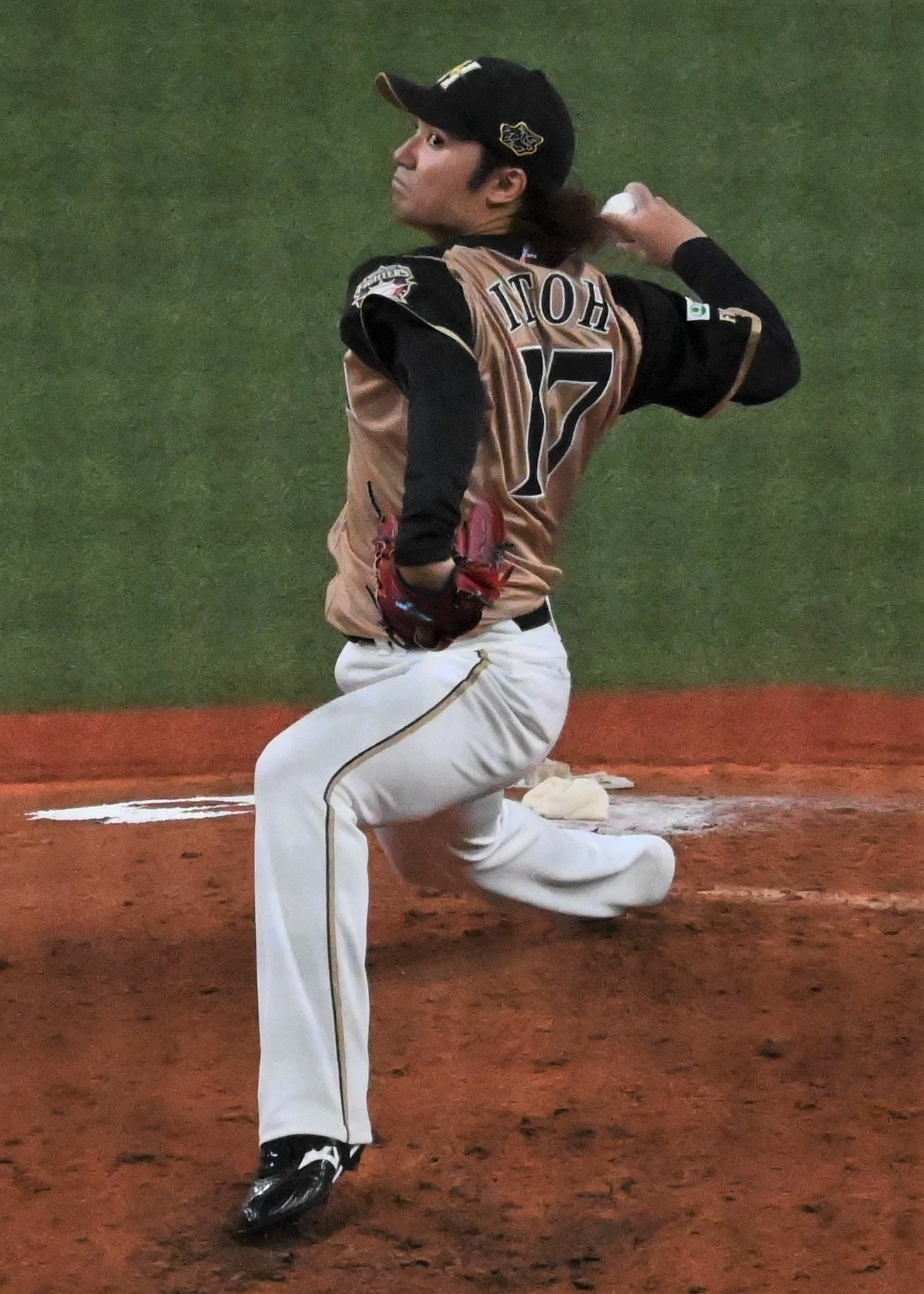
Hiromi Itoh pitched seven scoreless innings in Game 1.

Saturday, October 11, 2025, 2:02 pm (JST) at Es Con Field Hokkaido in Kitahiroshima, Hokkaido
Team	1	2	3	4	5	6	7	8	9	R	H	E
Orix	0	0	0	0	0	0	0	0	0	0	4	0
Nippon-Ham	0	1	0	1	0	0	0	0	X	2	8	1
WP: Hiromi Itoh (1–0) LP: Shunpeita Yamashita (0–1) Sv: Yukiya Saito (1); Home runs: ORX: None; NIP: Yuya Gunji (1); Attendance: 34,165; Boxscore

For Game 1, Hiromi Itoh was the starting pitcher for Nippon-Ham and Shunpeita Yamashita started for Orix. Itoh allowed no runs over seven innings, giving up just four hits while striking out nine. In the second inning, the Buffaloes hit two singles with two outs to put a runner in scoring position, but Itoh struck out Taishi Hirooka to end the inning. The Fighters responded in the bottom half of the inning with a double by Yuya Gunji, who then advanced to third base on a sacrifice bunt and then scored via a single by Chusei Mannami. Orix threatened to score again in the fourth inning when the bases were loaded after Itoh issued two walks with two outs. Hirooka then grounded out to keep the Buffaloes scoreless, however. Nippon-Ham responded again in the bottom of the inning with a solo homerun by Gunji off Yamashita. Yamashita only allowed the two runs over his six innings pitched, but Orix's offense only collected four hits all game. Nippon-Ham pitcher Yukiya Saito entered the game in the ninth inning and struck out all three Buffaloes batters to earn his first postseason save and secure the 2–0 shutout win.

=== Game 2 ===
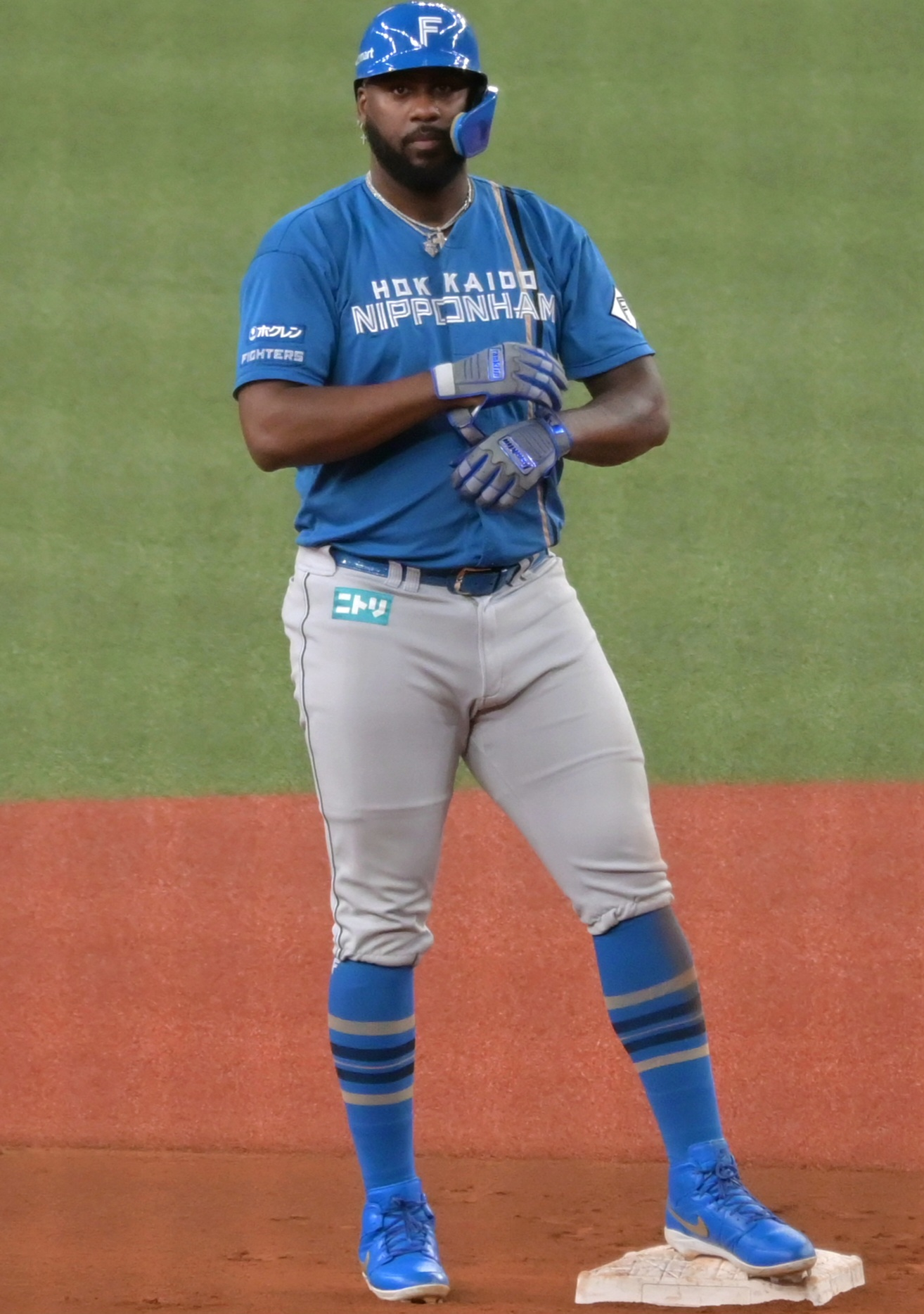
Franmil Reyes drove in the winning run in Game 2.

Sunday, October 12, 2025, 2:01 pm (JST) at Es Con Field Hokkaido in Kitahiroshima, Hokkaido
Team	1	2	3	4	5	6	7	8	9	R	H	E
Orix	0	1	3	0	0	0	0	0	0	4	6	0
Nippon-Ham	0	1	2	0	0	0	0	2	X	5	12	0
WP: Kenta Uehara (1–0) LP: Sho Iwasaki (0–1) Sv: Yukiya Saito (2); Home runs: ORX: Yutaro Sugimoto (1), Kotaro Kurebayashi (1); NIP: None; Attendance: 35,024; Boxscore

Game 2 featured starting pitchers Hiroya Miyagi for Orix and Koki Kitayama for the Nippon-Ham. The first run of the game came via Orix's Yutaro Sugimoto solo home run in the second inning. Nippon-Ham responded in the bottom half of the inning with an RBI single by Shun Mizutani to tied the game 1–1. The scoring continued the next inning when Kotaro Kurebayashi hit a home run with runners on first and third bases to again give the Buffaloes the lead. The Fighters' Kotaro Kiyomiya countered in the bottom of the inning with a triple that scored two to bring the team within one run of Orix.

Orix's Miyagi was removed from the game after the inning, and instead starter Allen Kuri was brought in to pitch in relief. Nippon-Ham's Kitayama was replaced an inning later. The game remained 4–3 until Sho Iwasaki entered to pitch for the Buffaloes in the eighth inning. After recording two outs, Iwasaki gave up consecutive hits to Mannami and Kota Yazawa to put runners on first and second bases. Franmil Reyes then hit a single over the right fielder's head to drive in both runners and take the lead. Saito closed out the game for Nippon-Ham by retiring all three batters he faced to record the save, secure the win, and advance to the final stage.

== Final stage ==
As winners of the Pacific League, the Fukuoka SoftBank Hawks advanced directly to the final stage of the Climax Series to host the Fighters, the eventual winner of the first stage. The Hawks won the season series against the Fighters 13–12 and finished 4½ games ahead of them. The two teams had faced each other in the Climax Series five times previously, with SoftBank winning three of them. This series was a rematch of the previous year's final stage. For the final stage, the PL champion Hawks were awarded a one-game advantage over the Fighters. A best-of-six series, all games in the final stage were hosted by SoftBank, the higher seeded team, at their home ballpark, Mizuho PayPay Dome.

=== Summary ===
Hawks won the series, 4–3*.

Game	Date	Score	Location	Time	Attendance
1	October 15	Hokkaido Nippon-Ham Fighters – 1, Fukuoka SoftBank Hawks – 2 (10)	Mizuho PayPay Dome	3:25	40,066
2	October 16	Hokkaido Nippon-Ham Fighters – 0, Fukuoka SoftBank Hawks – 3	Mizuho PayPay Dome	3:07	39,337
3	October 17	Hokkaido Nippon-Ham Fighters – 6, Fukuoka SoftBank Hawks – 0	Mizuho PayPay Dome	3:14	40,142
4	October 18	Hokkaido Nippon-Ham Fighters – 9, Fukuoka SoftBank Hawks – 3	Mizuho PayPay Dome	3:23	40,142
5	October 19	Hokkaido Nippon-Ham Fighters – 7, Fukuoka SoftBank Hawks – 1	Mizuho PayPay Dome	3:03	39,410
6	October 20	Hokkaido Nippon-Ham Fighters – 1, Fukuoka SoftBank Hawks – 2	Mizuho PayPay Dome	2:44	39,942

*The Pacific League regular season champion is given a one-game advantage in the final stage.

=== Game 1 ===
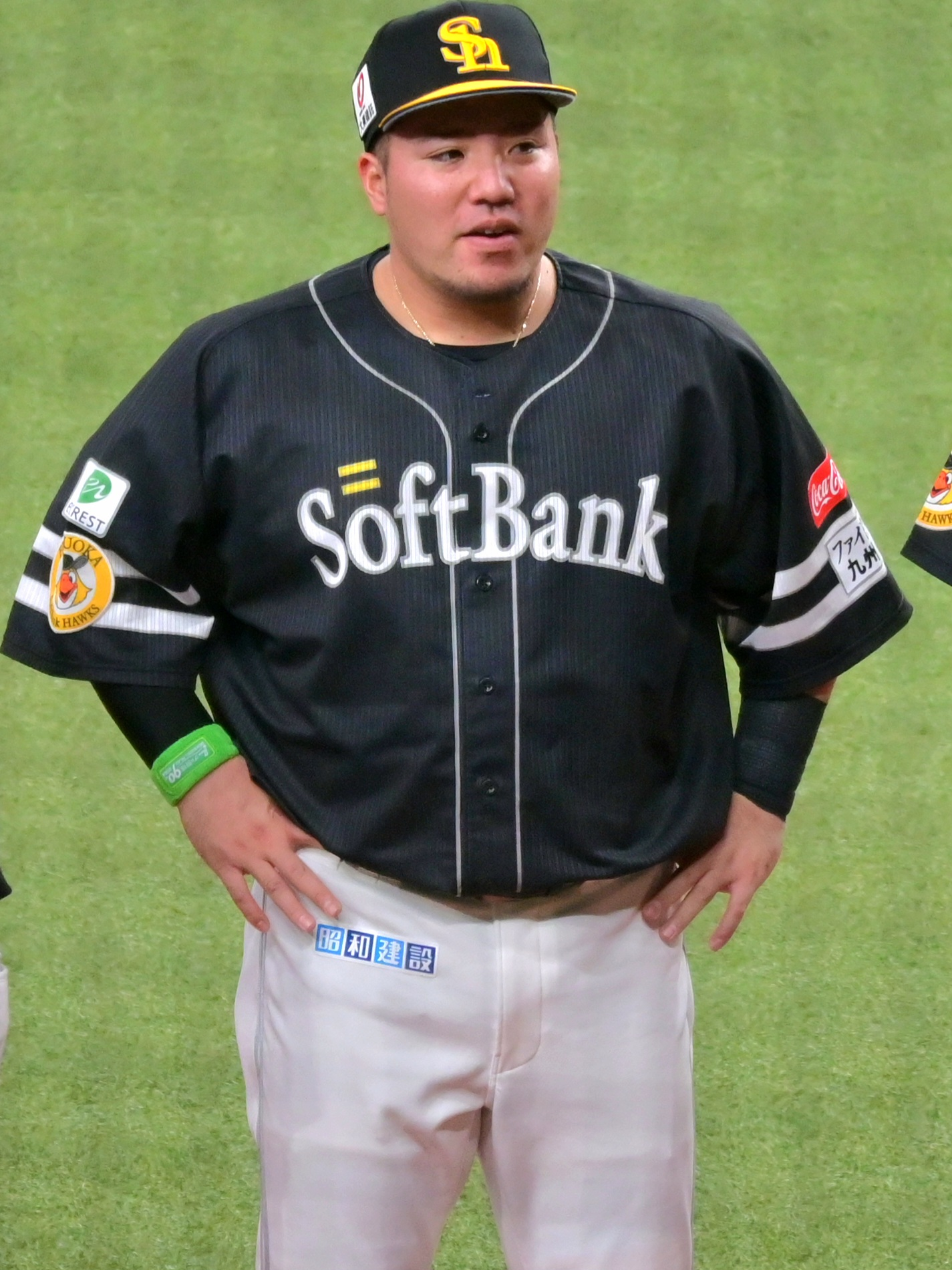
Hotaka Yamakawa hit a walk-off single in Game 1.

Wednesday, October 15, 2025, 6:00 pm (JST) at Mizuho PayPay Dome in Fukuoka, Fukuoka Prefecture
Team	1	2	3	4	5	6	7	8	9	10	R	H	E
Nippon-Ham	0	0	0	0	0	0	0	1	0	0	1	9	1
SoftBank	0	0	0	0	0	0	1	0	0	1X	2	10	2
WP: Koya Fujii (1–0) LP: Shoma Kanemura (0–1); Home runs: NIP: Franmil Reyes (1); SOF: Isami Nomura (1); Attendance: 40,066; Boxscore

Singer-songwriter and Fukuoka native Leo Ieiri performed the Japanese national anthem before Game 1, and former SoftBank player Seiichi Uchikawa threw out the ceremonial first pitch. Liván Moinelo was the starting pitcher for the Hawks and Kota Tatsu for the Fighters. In the first inning, Moinelo loaded the bases by issuing a walk, making a throwing error, and hitting a batter. With two outs, however, he got Kotaro Kiyomiya to ground out to end the inning. The Fighters had runners on base again in the second and third innings but were again unable to score. Tatsu also kept the Hawks scoreless. He retired all three batters in the bottom of the third inning. In the fifth, he gave up consecutive hits to Yuki Yanagita and Tatsuru Yanagimachi but was able to get Ryoya Kurihara to fly out to right field to escape the inning without allowing any runs. Tatsu left the game without giving up a run after managing a similar situation in the sixth inning. Meanwhile, Moinelo struck out all three Fighters batters in the sixth and seventh innings.

Seigi Tanaka entered the game in the bottom of the seventh inning in relief of Tatsu and immediately gave up a solo home run to the first batter he faced, Isami Nomura. The Fighters' Franmil Reyes responded the next inning by hitting a solo home run of his own off of the Hawks' first relief pitcher, Yuki Matsumoto. With the score tied 1–1, the game entered extra innings. Shoma Kanemura, the Nippon-Ham's fifth pitcher of the night, struggled in the tenth inning. He walked two batters and allowed a hit to load the bases before he was removed from the game. With one out and the bases loaded, Taisho Tamai came in to face Hotaka Yamakawa. Yamakawa hit a walk off single to win the game.

=== Game 2 ===
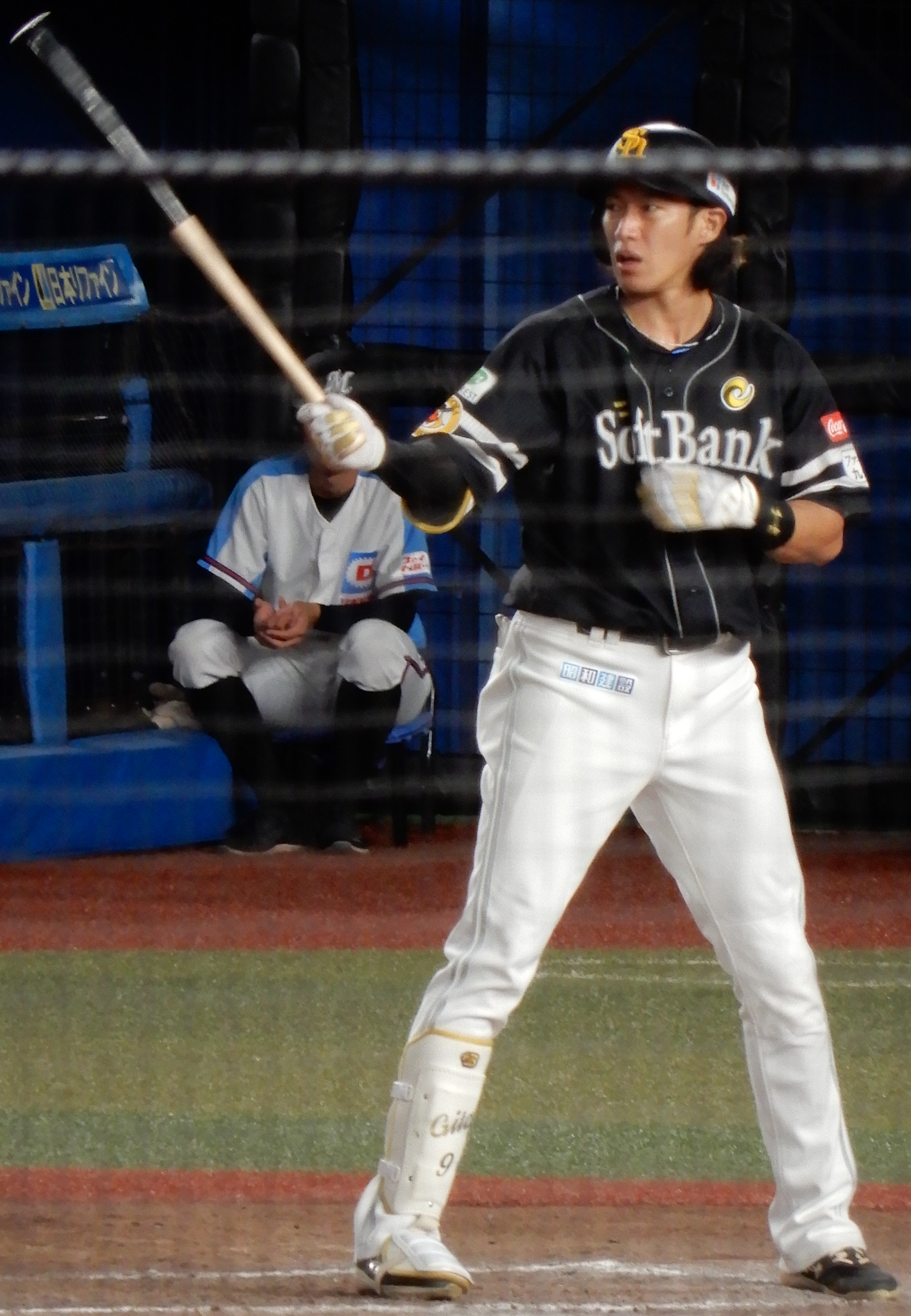
Yuki Yanagita hit a three-run home run in Game 2.

Thursday, October 16, 2025, 6:01 pm (JST) at Mizuho PayPay Dome in Fukuoka, Fukuoka Prefecture
Team	1	2	3	4	5	6	7	8	9	R	H	E
Nippon-Ham	0	0	0	0	0	0	0	0	0	0	6	0
SoftBank	0	0	0	0	0	0	0	3	X	3	6	0
WP: Yuki Matsumoto (1–0) LP: Ren Fukushima (0–1) Sv: Kazuki Sugiyama (1); Home runs: NIP: None; SOF: Yuki Yanagita (1); Attendance: 39,337; Boxscore

Nobuhiro Matsuda, another former Hawks player, threw the ceremonial first pitch before Game 2. SoftBank started pitcher Kohei Arihara, while DeNA started Ren Fukushima. Throughout the game, the Fighters were unable to capitalize on scoring opportunities. In the first inning, a walk from Chusei Mannami and a single by Kiyomiya put runners on first and third bases with one only out, however Reyes and Ariel Martínez both struck out. In Game 1, Yuya Gunji was hitless in his five at bats. In Game 2, with runners on second and third bases with one out, he hit a foul flyball caught for an out in the fourth inning. He later grounded out in the sixth inning with two outs and the bases loaded. Arihara left the game after the inning and the Hawks' relief pitching kept the Fighters from the scoring in remaining three innings.

In Fukushima's starting effort, he kept SoftBank scoreless for the majority of the game. He gave up a double to Yanagimachi in the fourth inning with only one out but struck out the next two batters to end the inning. Through seven innings, tying his longest professional outting, Fukushima had already thrown 116 pitches and struck out ten batters, both professional career highs. Yamakawa opened the eighth inning with a single and the Hawks followed up with sacrifice bunt and a walk to put two runners on base with one out. Kenta Uehara then came in to relieve Fukushima who had thrown a total of 125 pitches and allowed only three hits. Yanagita, Uehara's first batter faced, then hit a three-run home run, providing the only runs needed to give the Hawks the win.

=== Game 3 ===
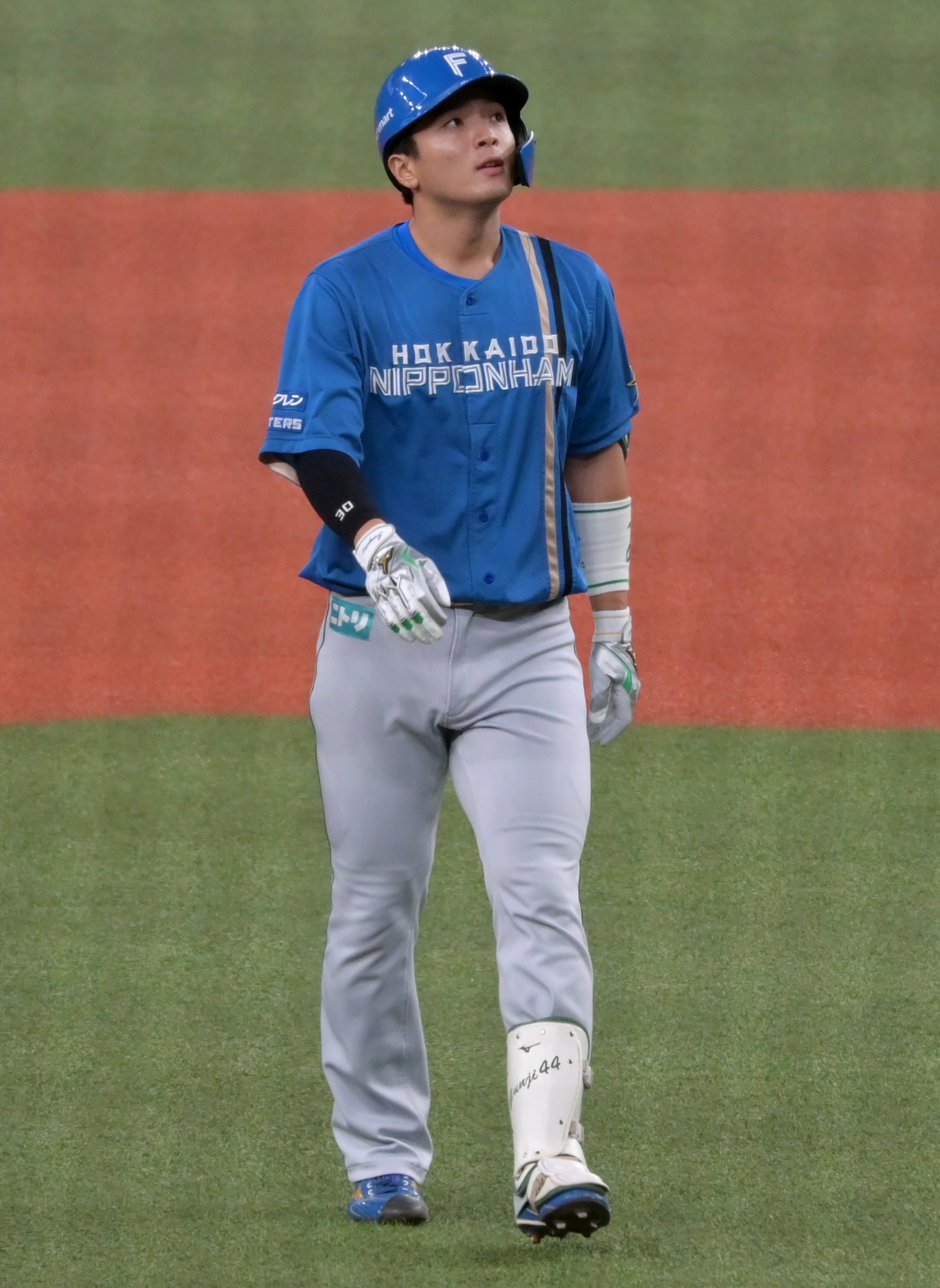
Yuya Gunji had four RBIs in Game 3.

Friday, October 17, 2025, 6:00 pm (JST) at Mizuho PayPay Dome in Fukuoka, Fukuoka Prefecture
Team	1	2	3	4	5	6	7	8	9	R	H	E
Nippon-Ham	1	0	0	1	0	0	4	0	0	6	9	0
SoftBank	0	0	0	0	0	0	0	0	0	0	5	0
WP: Hiromi Itoh (0–0) LP: Naoyuki Uwasawa (0–0); Home runs: NIP: Franmil Reyes (2), Shu Yamagata (1); SOF: None; Attendance: 40,142; Boxscore

Game 3 featured starting pitchers Hiromi Itoh for Nippon-Ham and Naoyuki Uwasawa for SoftBank. In the first inning, Shun Mizutani singled to right field, and then a passed ball and a Reyes walk put runners on first and third bases with one out. Gunji, who had struggled in the previous two games, then hit a sacrifice fly to collect an RBI and give the Fighters the lead. It was their first lead of the series. Reyes doubled the lead with a solo home run in the fourth inning and Shu Yamagata extended it to three with another solo home run off of Uwasawa in the seventh. Later in the inning, with the bases loaded, Gunji hit a three-run double to make it 6–0. Uwasawa left the game with two outs in the seventh giving up six runs, five of which were earned. For Nippon-Ham, Itoh pitched eight scoreless innings with 11 strikeouts helping the team win their first game and extended the series.

=== Game 4 ===
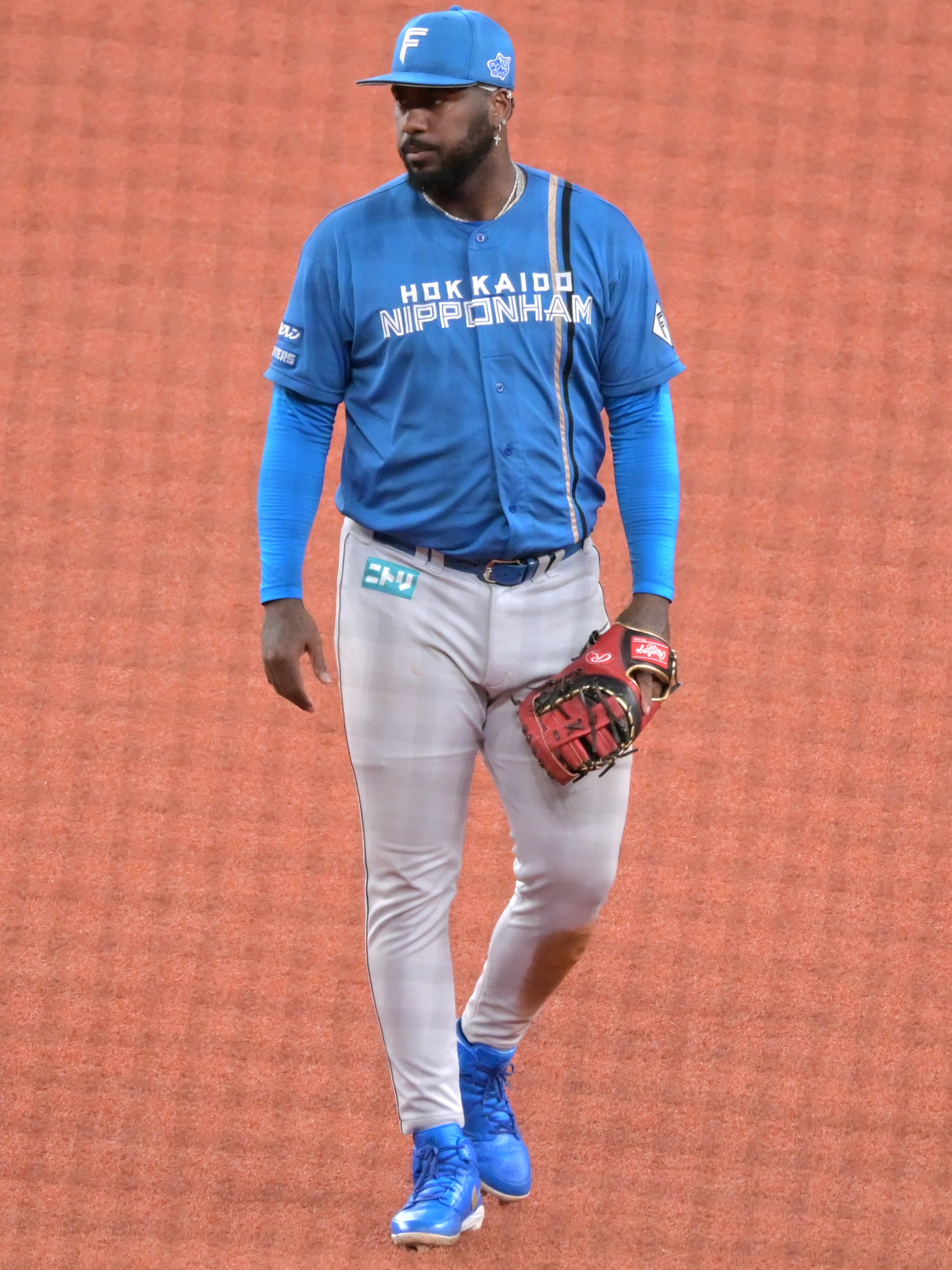
Reyes hit two home runs in Game 4.

Saturday, October 18, 2025, 2:00 pm (JST) at Mizuho PayPay Dome in Fukuoka, Fukuoka Prefecture
Team	1	2	3	4	5	6	7	8	9	R	H	E
Nippon-Ham	0	0	4	2	1	0	2	0	0	9	14	0
SoftBank	1	0	1	0	1	0	0	0	0	3	8	0
WP: Koki Kitayama (1–0) LP: Tomohisa Ohzeki (0–1); Home runs: NIP: Franmil Reyes 2 (4), Shun Mizutani (1); SOF: Isami Nomura (1); Attendance: 40,142; Boxscore

Game 4 featured starting pitchers Koki Kitayama for the Fighters and Tomohisa Ohzeki for the Hawks. SoftBank was the first to score, with Akira Nakamura hitting an RBI triple with two out in the bottom of the first inning. Nakamura would later leave the game on a stretcher in the third inning after he collided with the first base umpire while attempting to reach base on his ground ball hit. The Fighters took the lead in the third inning. Mizutani walked and Yamagata hit an RBI-triple to tie the game, and then Reyes hit a two-run home run off of Ohzeki to put them ahead 3–1. The inning continued with a double by Gunji and a single by Kiyomiya, prompting Ohzeki to be removed from the game. Martinez then drew a walk to load the bases with one out and Mannami hit a sacrifice fly to add another run and close out a four-run inning. Nippon-Ham added to their run total the next inning with a solo home run by Mizutani that hit the right field foul pole, and Kiyomiya added an RBI single to center field. Reyes hit a two-run home run in the seventh inning making the score 7–3. The home run was his fourth of the series and second of the game. He ended the day with three hits and four RBIs. In addition to the first inning run, Kitayama allowed one run each in the third and fifth innings and finished the day after the seven-innings pitched.

=== Game 5 ===
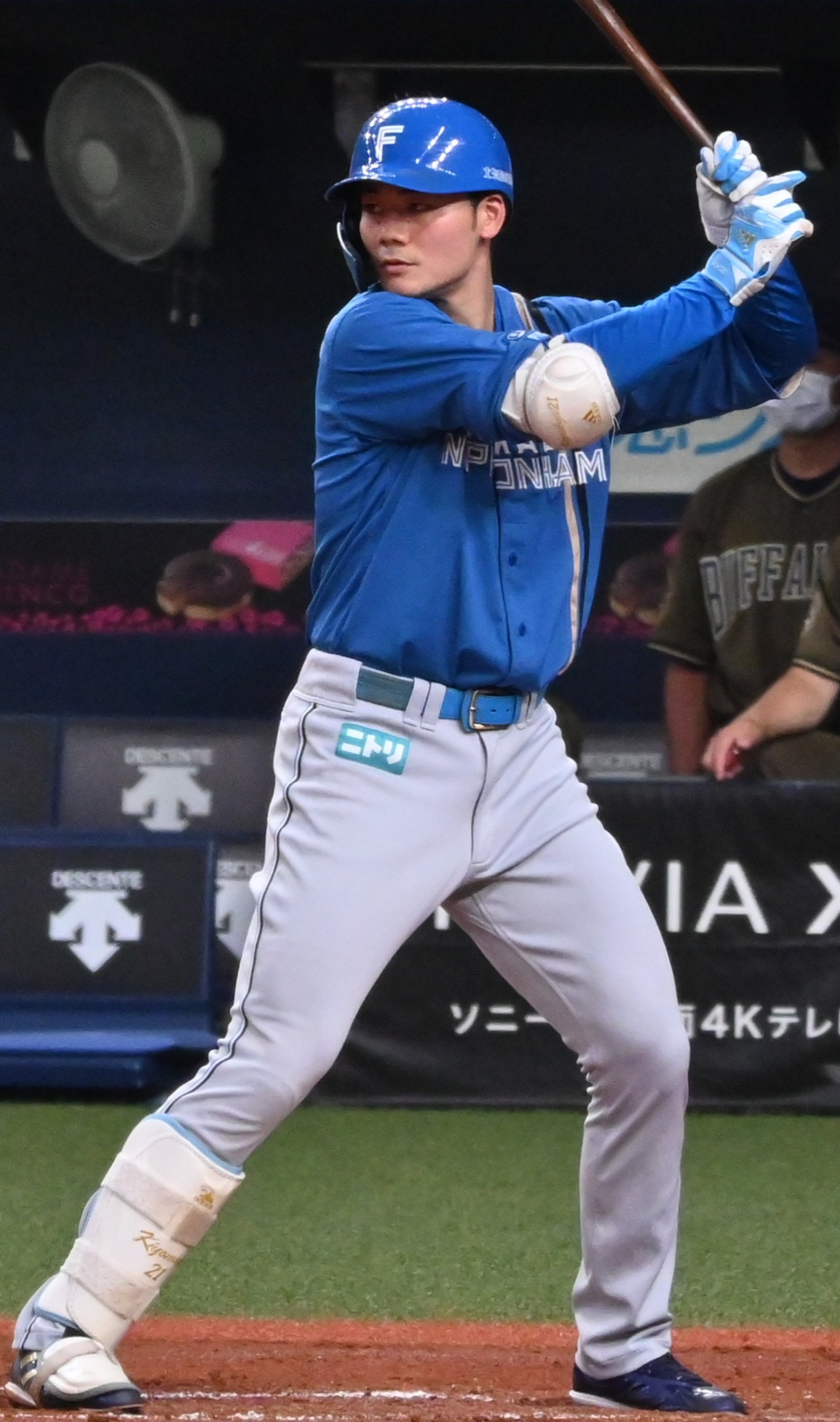
Kotaro Kiyomiya had three RBIs in Game 5.

Sunday, October 19, 2025, 1:00 pm (JST) at Mizuho PayPay Dome in Fukuoka, Fukuoka Prefecture
Team	1	2	3	4	5	6	7	8	9	R	H	E
Nippon-Ham	0	0	0	3	3	1	0	0	0	7	8	0
SoftBank	0	0	0	0	0	0	1	0	0	1	6	2
WP: Sachiya Yamasaki (1–0) LP: Ryosuke Ohtsu (0–1); Home runs: NIP: None; SOF: Hotaka Yamakawa (1); Attendance: 39,410; Boxscore

Gu Lin Ruei-yang was the starting pitcher for the Fighters and Ryosuke Ohtsu for the Hawks. In the first inning, SoftBank's Shuto stole second base but collided with shortstop Yamagata in the process. Yamagata's left leg was injured on the play and had to be carried off on a stretcher and replaced. Ohtsu allowed a single to Kazunari Ishii, Yamagata's replacement, in the fourth inning and then walked the next two batters to load the bases with no outs. Kiyomiya and Yua Tamiya then both drove in a run each with productive outs. Next, Mannami hit a single to put runners on first and third bases, and Kota Yazawa hit an RBI double to close out the scoring in the inning and giving the Fighters a three-run lead. Nippon-Ham's scoring continued the next innings. In the fifth, Kiyomiya hit a two-run double and Tamiya drove in a runner from third via a successful squeeze play. In the sixth, Mannami hit a triple and SoftBank's Yamakawa misplayed a hit by Tatsuki Mizuno and made an errant throw to first base, allowing Mannami to score.

Gu Lin pitched 4 2/3 innings, giving up only two hits and no runs while striking out six. Sachiya Yamasaki earned the win in relief of Guf Lin. The Fighters' third pitcher of the game, Takayuki Kato, gave up a solo home run to Yamakawa in the seventh inning, but their next two pitchers kept the Hawks scoreless to force a winner-take-all Game 6.

=== Game 6 ===
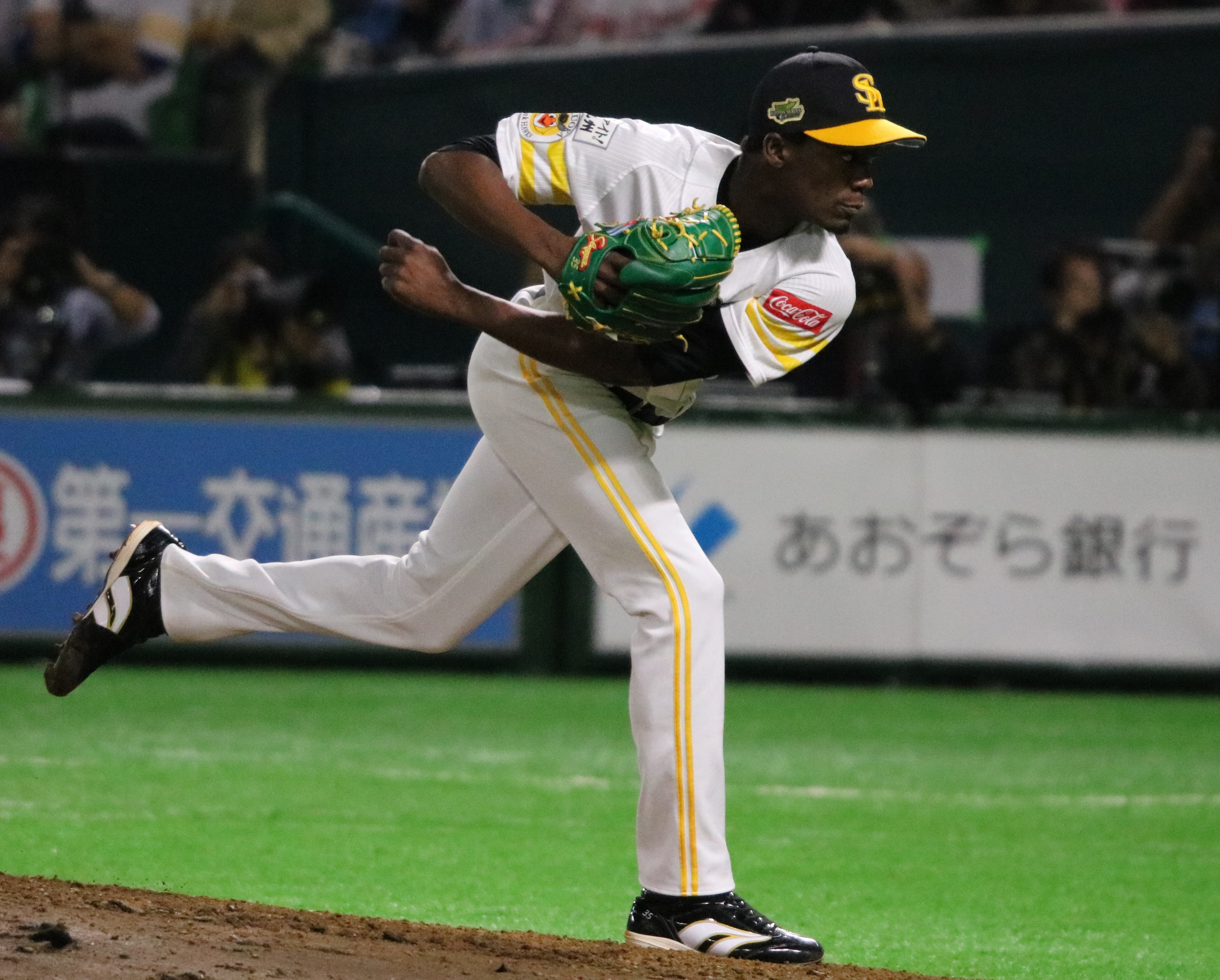
Liván Moinelo started Game 6 and was named the series MVP.

Monday, October 20, 2025, 6:00 pm (JST) at Mizuho PayPay Dome in Fukuoka, Fukuoka Prefecture
Team	1	2	3	4	5	6	7	8	9	R	H	E
Nippon-Ham	0	0	0	1	0	0	0	0	0	1	3	1
SoftBank	0	0	1	0	1	0	0	0	X	2	6	0
WP: Liván Moinelo (1–0) LP: Kota Tatsu (0–1) Sv: Kazuki Sugiyama (2); Attendance: 39,942; Boxscore

Game 6 was a pitching rematch of Game 1, with Moinelo starting for the Hawks and Tatsu starting for the Fighters. SoftBank was the first to score when Takashi Umino reached base on a groundball single, advanced to second on a single by Taisei Makihara, and scored on a throwing error by Nippon-Ham first baseman Kiyomiya in the third inning. The Fighters were able to tie the game 1–1 the next inning on an RBI double by Gunji. However, in the fifth inning, Tatsu walked Yamakawa, struck out the next two batters, and then allowed three consecutive singles; the first two loaded the bases and the third by Hikaru Kawase scored a run and gave the Hawks a 2–1 lead. Nippon-Ham's Tatsu gave up just two runs in 5 2/3 innings pitched, however SoftBank's Moinelo pitched seven innings and allowed only a single run on three hits with six strikeouts.

== Aftermath ==
The Fighters were the first team in NPB playoff history to force a winner-take-all game after falling behind 0–3 in the series. The Hawks' win qualified them to play in the Japan Series for the second consecutive year. It will also be their 22nd time overall, surpassing the Saitama Seibu Lions as the PL team with the most Japan Series appearances. After Game 6, pitcher Liván Moinelo was named the final stage's most valuable player (MVP) and received a one million yen prize. He started the first and last games of the series, earning one win and no losses with an ERA of 0.64. SoftBank sprayed champagne, wine, cola, and sake on each other to celebrate the win. Traditionally they would have sprayed beer, however, due to a cyberattack to Asahi Group Holdings that caused a beer shortage, they were forced to use alternatives.
