= Yanagimachi =

Yanagimachi is a Japanese surname. Notable people with the surname include:

- Mitsuo Yanagimachi (born 1945), Japanese screenwriter and film director
- Ryuzo Yanagimachi (born 1928), Japanese biologist
- Tatsuru Yanagimachi (born 1997), Japanese baseball player
