= 2025 Japan Series =

Nippon Professional Baseball's championship series

Team (Wins)	Managers	Season
Fukuoka SoftBank Hawks (4)	Hiroki Kokubo	87–52–4 (.626), 4½ GA
Hanshin Tigers (1)	Kyuji Fujikawa	85–54–4 (.612), 13 GA
- Dates: October 25–30
- Venue(s): Mizuho PayPay Dome (SoftBank); Koshien Stadium (Hanshin)
- MVP: Hotaka Yamakawa (SoftBank)
- FSA: Teruaki Sato (Hanshin)
- Umpires: Shoji Arisumi, Hidetomo Ashihara, Kohei Makita, Naoto Shikita, Kazuyuki Shirai, Takahiro Tsuchiyama, Tetsuo Yamaji

Broadcast
- Television: TBS, NHK-BS, Fuji TV, TV Asahi, ABC, NNN, TVer, U-Next, Abema, Hulu
- TV announcers: Norihiro Akahoshi, Koji Akiyama, Shoma Hiramatsu, Ken Iguchi, Chikafusa Ikeda, Masao Inoue, Masayuki Kakefu, Munenori Kawasaki, Hiromi Makihara, Nobuhiro Matsuda, Akinobu Okada, Kazuhiro Sasaki, Junichi Takano, Shingo Takatsu, Yohei Takeshita, Takashi Toritani, Seiichi Uchikawa

The 2025 Japan Series (日本シリーズ, Nippon Shirīzu; branded as the SMBC Nippon Series 2025 for sponsorship reasons) was the championship series of Nippon Professional Baseball's (NPB) 2025 season. The 76th edition of the Japan Series, it was a best-of-seven playoff series played between the Central League (CL) Climax Series champion Hanshin Tigers and the Pacific League (PL) Climax Series champion Fukuoka SoftBank Hawks. The Hawks defeated the Tigers in five games.

SoftBank returned to the Japan Series for the second consecutive year after losing the previous year to the CL's third-seeded team. This was their 22nd overall appearance, a new PL record. For Hanshin, this was their eighth Japan Series overall appearance, with their last coming in 2023, a series that they won to secure their first championship in 38 years. The Hawks won all three previous meetings between the two teams in the championship round, with the last time being 2014. As per NPB tradition, home field advantage was awarded to the Pacific League team, as the Central League team held advantage the previous year.

Hanshin clinched their first CL championship in two years on September 7, the earliest pennant win in CL history. Kyuji Fujikawa, former Tiger and Major League player, led the team to the pennant in his first year as manager. They finished the season 13 games ahead of the second-place Yokohama DeNA BayStars, and as winners of the CL, they advanced directly to the final stage of the CL Climax Series where they hosted the BayStars. The Tigers began the best-of-six series with a one-win advantage and swept the next three games against DeNA to advance. SoftBank clinched their second straight PL championship late in the season after a close race with the Hokkaido Nippon-Ham Fighters. Injuries to key players contributed to a slow start and forced manager Hiroki Kokubo to dip into the team's depth early. They bounced back after April and played well in the final five months of the season, including an interleague title. SoftBank moved directly to the final stage of the PL Climax Series with an automatic one-win advantage over the Fighters and won the first two games to make it 3–0. However, Nippon-Ham came back to win the next three games and tie the series at three games apiece. The Hawks went on to win Game 6 to advance to the Japan Series.

In a reflection of the 2014 Japan Series between the Tigers and Hawks, in which the Tigers won Game 1, but lost Games 2–5 to allow the Hawks to win the Japan Series, Game 1 was once again won by the Tigers, their first ever Japan Series win in Fukuoka in eight games. However, Ukyo Shuto's record-breaking five-hit game contributed to SoftBank's 14 total hits that powered the Hawks to a 10–1 victory in Game 2 to tie the series. The next two games were tight contests ultimately won by SoftBank, in part thanks to home runs hit by Hotaka Yamakawa in both. With home runs in Games 2, 3, and 4, Yamakawa tied the record for most consecutive Japan Series games with a home run. The Hawks clinched their 12th Japan Series championship at Koshien Stadium in Game 5, doing so in extra innings for their first Japan Series victory in five years and their eighth title since 2011. SoftBank's Yamakawa was named the Japan Series Most Valuable Player.

== Background ==
In their 90th anniversary season, the Hanshin Tigers clinched their first Central League (CL) championship in two years and seventh overall on September 7, the earliest pennant win in CL history. The previous record was September 8, set by the Yomiuri Giants in 1990. Kyuji Fujikawa, former Tigers closer and Major League player, led the team to the pennant in his first year as manager. At the time the championship was decided, the Tigers were 17 games ahead of the second-place team, and all of the other CL teams had losing records. Hanshin was the top team in the Central League throughout the season. The team struggled during interleague play in June, losing seven straight games, their biggest losing streak of the season. Strong pitching and good offense powered Hanshin's success throughout the season. They were league best in runs scored and runs allowed at the time of clinching. By season's end, Teruaki Sato finished with 40 home runs and 102 runs batted in (RBIs), both NPB bests for the year and making him a likely PL Most Valuable Player (MVP) candidate. Teammates Shota Morishita had the second-most home runs in the CL with 23 and Koji Chikamoto stole the most bases in the league for the fourth straight year. As for pitching, starter Hiroto Saiki finished the season with a CL-best 1.55 earned run average (ERA) and Shoki Murakami accumulated the most wins and strikeouts. Daichi Ishii also pitched 50 straight scoreless innings in relief, a Nippon Professional Baseball (NPB) record.

Hanshin finished the season 13 games ahead of the second-place Yokohama DeNA BayStars. As winners of the Central League, they advanced directly to the final stage of the CL Climax Series where they hosted the BayStars, eventual winner of the first stage. The Tigers began the best-of-six series with a one-win advantage and swept the next three games against DeNA to advance to the Japan Series.

The Fukuoka SoftBank Hawks clinched their second straight Pacific League (PL) championship and 21st overall on September 27 with only four games remaining in the season. Unlike 2024 in which they occupied first place for the majority of the season, the Hawks' 2025 campaign started poorly. The team fell as low as seven games under .500 by early May and found itself last in the PL, six games behind first. Injuries to key players Yuki Yanagita, Kensuke Kondo, Ryoya Kurihara, Ukyo Shuto, and Kenta Imamiya contributed to SoftBank's slow start and forced manager Hiroki Kokubo to dip into the team's depth early to give new players an opportunity to cover for the injured veterans. After April, the team bounced back and won at least 14 games in each of the next five months. They won interleague play in June, first moved into the top spot in the PL in late July, and secured first place for good in early August. Outfielder Tatsuru Yanagimachi won the interleague MVP award and contended for the PL batting title all year, ultimately coming in second to teammate Taisei Makihara who finished with a .304 batting average. Both are contenders for PL MVP. Hawks' pitching also excelled throughout the season. Three of their starting pitchers accumulated at least 140 innings pitched and ERAs of 2.78 or lower, four had at least 12 wins, and Liván Moinelo led NPB with a 1.46 ERA. Relief pitcher Kazuki Sugiyama also led the league in saves. Ukyo Shuto stole the most bases for the third straight season.

As winners of the Pacific League, SoftBank advanced directly to the final stage of the PL Climax Series. There they played the second-place Hokkaido Nippon-Ham Fighters, the eventual first stage winner. The Hawks were granted the automatic one-win advantage and won the first two games of the series to make it 3–0. However, the Fighters came back to win the next three games and tie the series at three games apiece. It was the first time in NPB Climax Series history that a team forced a winner-take-all game after falling behind 0–3 in a series. SoftBank went on to win the final game 2–1 and advanced to the Japan Series for the second straight year.

First stage
Central League
2	Yokohama DeNA BayStars	2
3	Yomiuri Giants	0
Pacific League
2	Hokkaido Nippon-Ham Fighters	2
3	Orix Buffaloes	0

Final stage
1	Hanshin Tigers	4
2	Yokohama DeNA BayStars	0
1	Fukuoka SoftBank Hawks	4
2	Hokkaido Nippon-Ham Fighters	3

Japan Series
CL1	Hanshin Tigers	1
PL1	Fukuoka SoftBank Hawks	4

== Series notes ==
2025 Japan Series managers

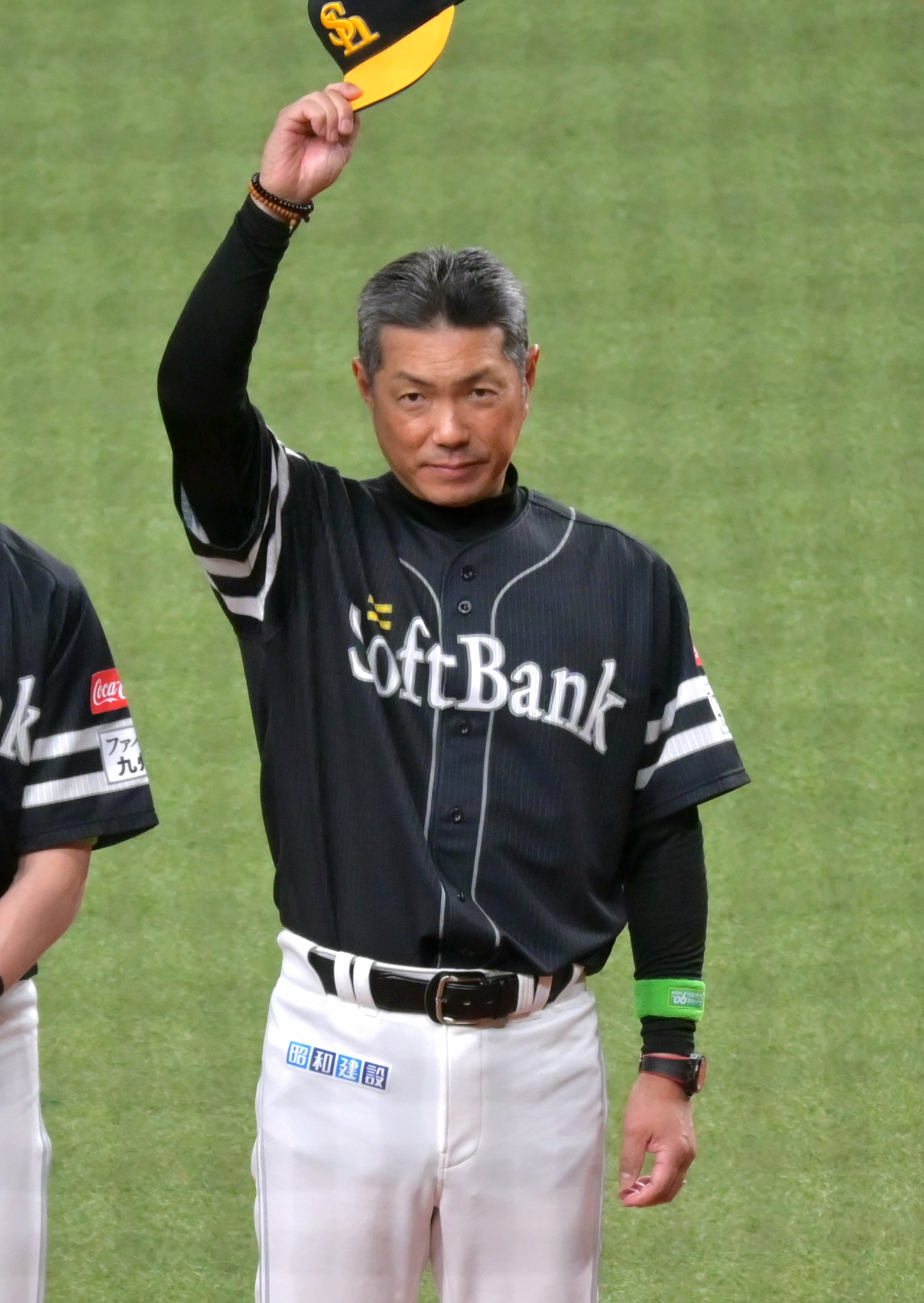
Hiroki Kokubo, SoftBank

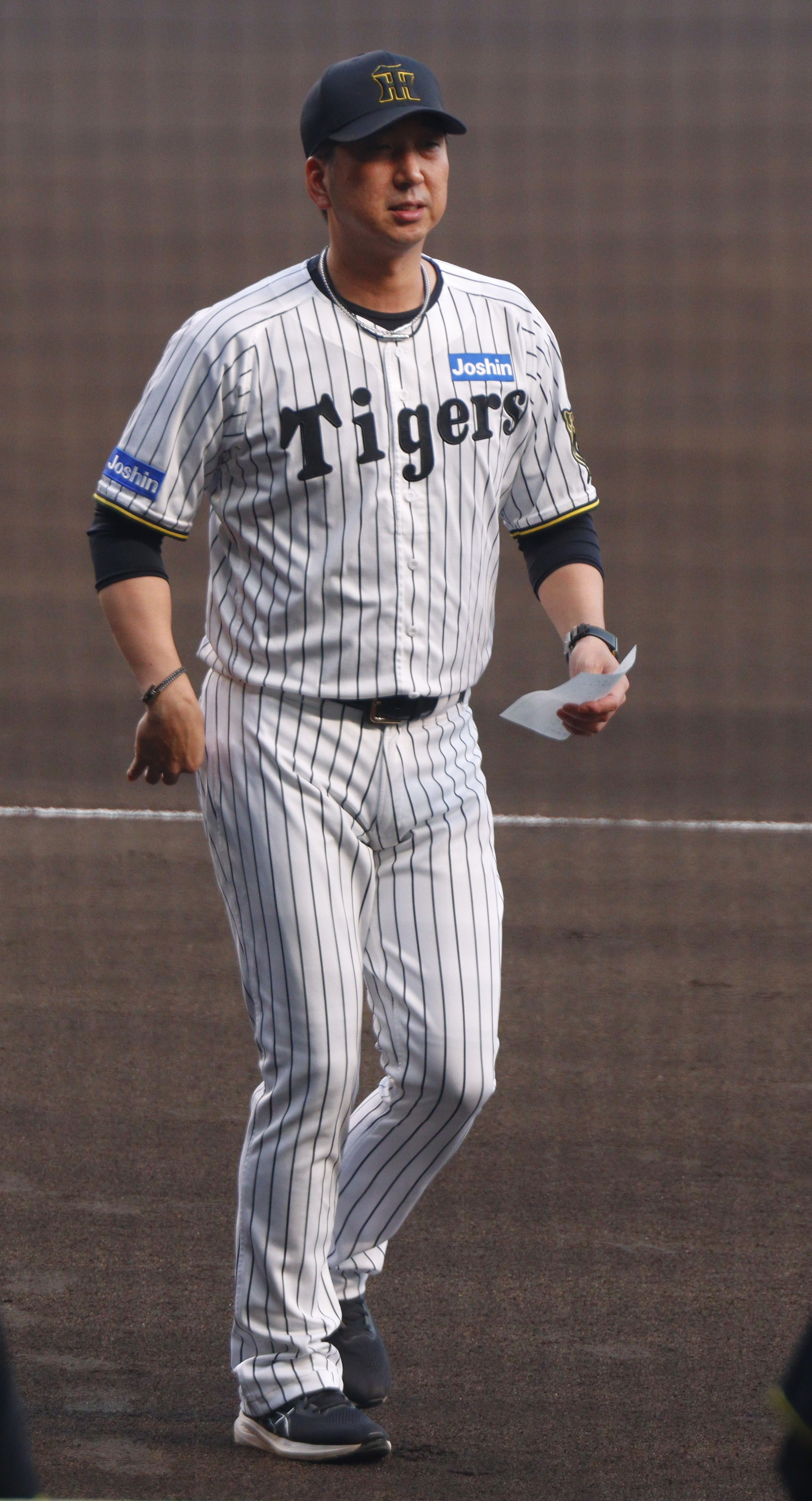
Kyuji Fujikawa, Hanshin

SoftBank is considered to be a current NPB dynasty, winning seven of the ten Japan Series from 2011 to 2020. This is their second consecutive Japan Series appearance, however, the team lost in 2024 to the Yokohama DeNA BayStars, the third-seeded CL team. The Hawks won the first two games in that series but then lost the next four games to lose the championship to a team that was considered to be a heavy underdog. This series is also their 22nd Japan Series appearance, surpassing the Saitama Seibu Lions as the PL team with the most championship appearances. Hanshin's last appearance in the Japan Series was two years ago in 2023, a series that they won to secure their first Japan Series championship in 38 years and only their second overall. This series is their eighth time appearing in the championship round.

The two teams have met in the championship series three times. In their first meeting, the 1964 Japan Series, the then Osaka-based Hawks defeated the Tigers in seven games. They again beat the Tigers in seven games during their second meeting in 2003. The last time the two teams met in the Series was in 2014, when the Hawks defeated the Tigers a third time, four games to one. The Tigers had lost all seven road games in the two Series played against the Hawks since their move to Fukuoka, a occurrence dubbed the "curse of Hakata" by Japanese media. In their only regular season meeting during interleague play in June this season, SoftBank won the series 2–1.

Home field advantage for the Japan Series alternates between the Pacific and Central League representatives every year. For 2025, it was the PL's turn to hold the advantage, so home field was awarded to the Hawks. The designated hitter rule was only in effect for games one and two, played at Mizuho PayPay Dome Fukuoka, home of the Hawks, as the CL has not adopted the rule. Sumitomo Mitsui Banking Corporation (SMBC) sponsored the event for the twelfth consecutive year and held the naming rights for the series, with its full title being "SMBC Nippon Series 2025".

== Summary ==
SoftBank won the series, 4–1.

Game	Date	Score	Location	Time	Attendance
1	October 25	Hanshin Tigers – 2, Fukuoka SoftBank Hawks – 1	Mizuho PayPay Dome	3:17	36,882
2	October 26	Hanshin Tigers – 1, Fukuoka SoftBank Hawks – 10	Mizuho PayPay Dome	3:13	36,910
3	October 28	Fukuoka SoftBank Hawks – 2, Hanshin Tigers – 1	Koshien Stadium	3:27	41,594
4	October 29	Fukuoka SoftBank Hawks – 3, Hanshin Tigers – 2	Koshien Stadium	3:30	41,591
5	October 30	Fukuoka SoftBank Hawks – 3, Hanshin Tigers – 2 (11)	Koshien Stadium	4:09	41,606

== Game summaries ==
=== Game 1 ===
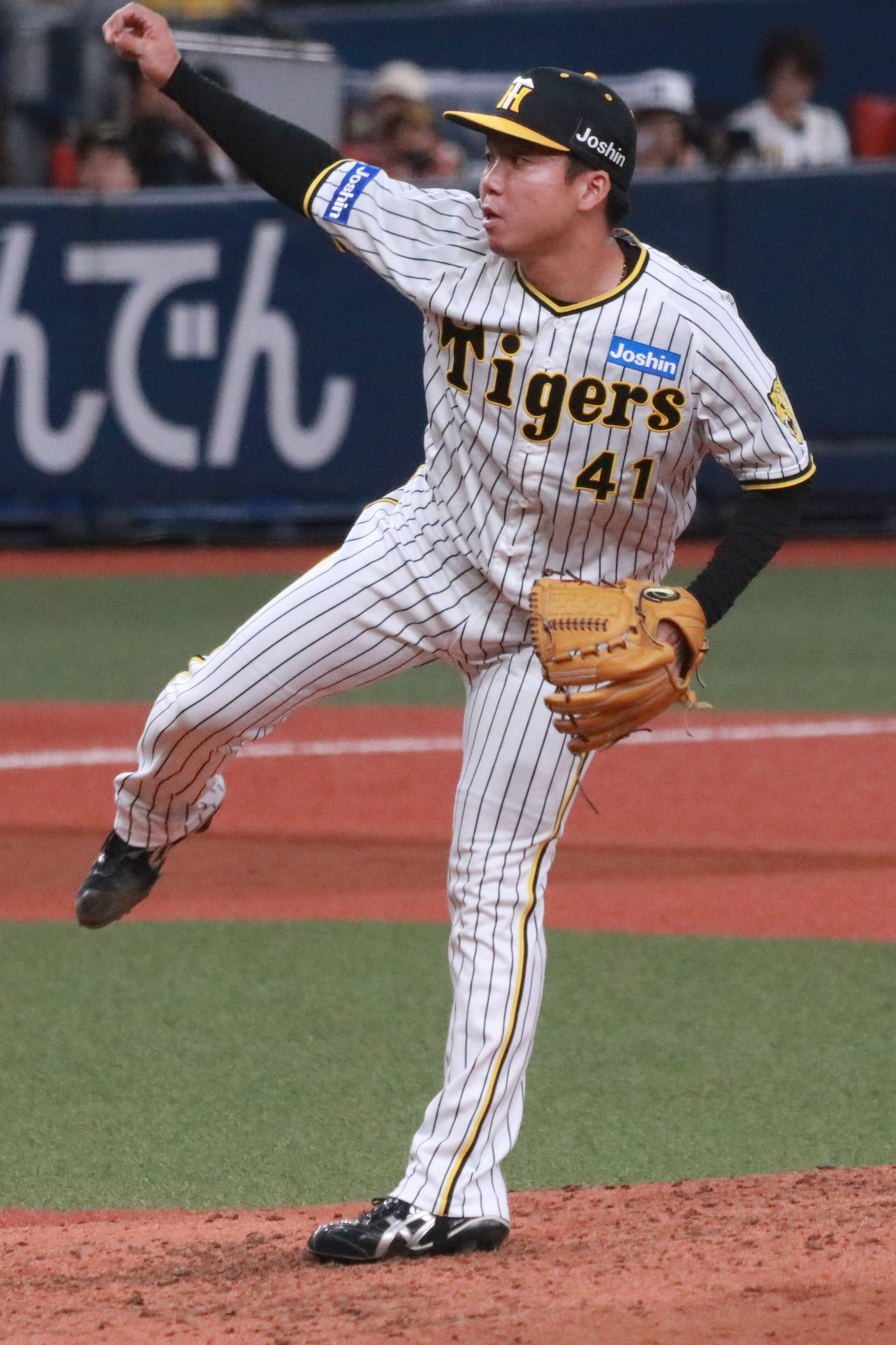
Shoki Murakami pitched seven innings to earn the win for the Tigers in Game 1.

Saturday, October 25, 2025, 6:32 pm (JST) at Mizuho PayPay Dome in Fukuoka, Fukuoka Prefecture
Team	1	2	3	4	5	6	7	8	9	R	H	E
Hanshin	0	0	0	0	0	2	0	0	0	2	6	1
SoftBank	1	0	0	0	0	0	0	0	0	1	8	0
WP: Shoki Murakami (1–0) LP: Kohei Arihara (0–1) Sv: Daichi Ishii (1); Attendance: 36,882; Boxscore

Before the start of Game 1, sopranist Tomotaka Okamoto sang the Japanese national anthem, and former Hawks manager Kimiyasu Kudo, who led the team to five championships, threw out the ceremonial first pitch. Of the 18 starting players for Game 1, none were foreign-born. It was the first time in 25 years that there were no foreign-born starting players in a Japan Series game. Shoki Murakami started for the Tigers, while Kohei Arihara started for the Hawks. Back for the Japan Series after missing the entirety of the Climax Series due to pain on his left side, Kensuke Kondo began the game's scoring in the bottom of the first inning when he hit an RBI single for the Hawks. In the top of the sixth inning, the Tigers scored two runs after Koji Chikamoto hit a single and recorded a stolen base, followed by a bunt single by Takumu Nakano, moving Chikamoto to third base, and Nakano stealing second base. Shota Morishita then tied the game with an RBI ground out and Teruaki Sato gave the Tigers the lead with an RBI double. Murakami allowed one run in seven innings pitched. Though SoftBank had two baserunners in the ninth inning after a Yuki Yanagita single and Ukyo Shuto reached base on a catcher's interference call, Daichi Ishii ended the inning without allowing a run. It was Ishii's 12th consecutive scoreless postseason game since 2021, and it earned him his first save in the Japan Series. The win was Hanshin's first in Fukuoka in the Japan Series in eight tries. For SoftBank, it was the first time they lost Game 1 of a Japan Series since 2014.

=== Game 2 ===
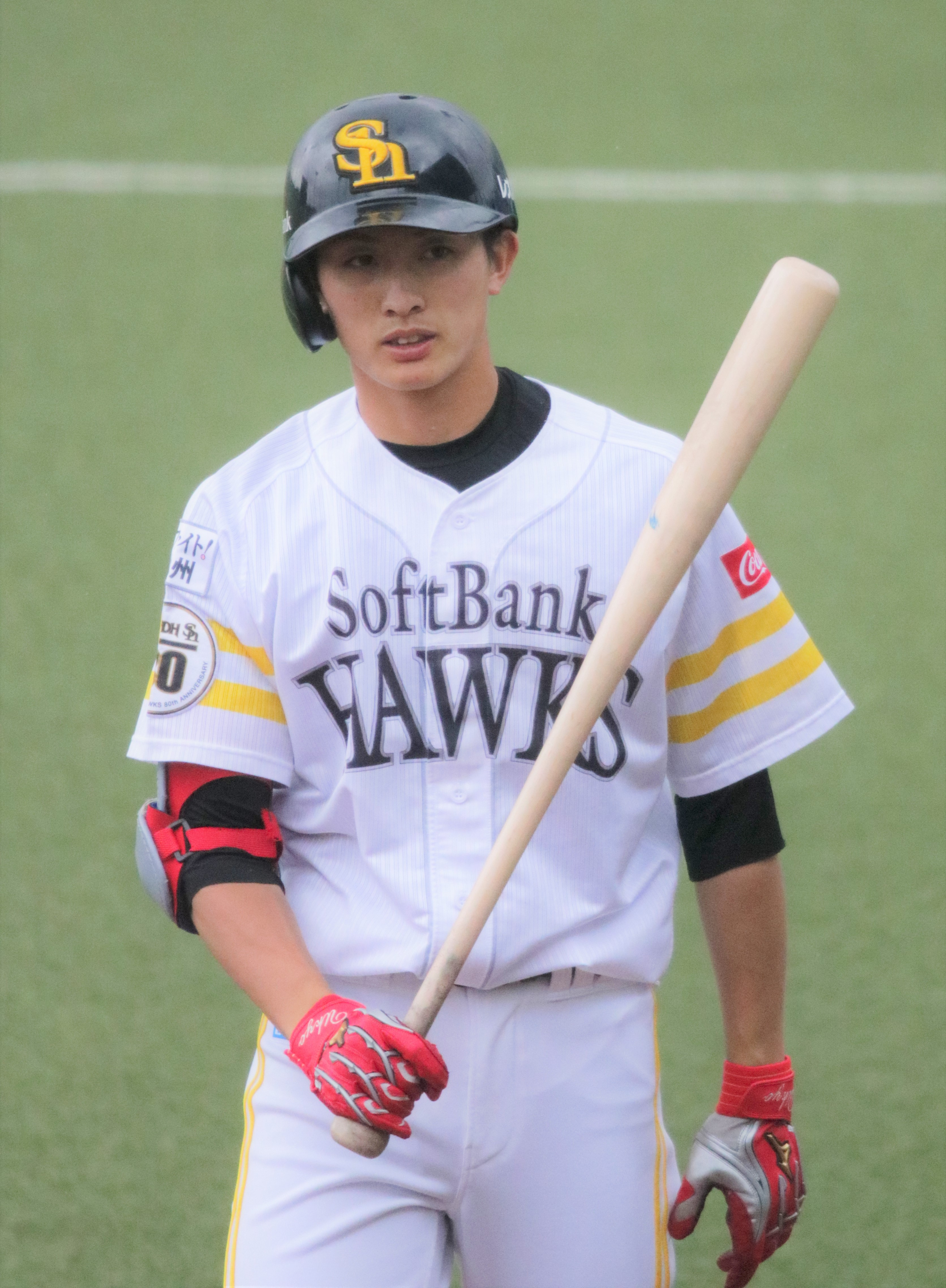
Ukyo Shuto had a record five hits in Game 2.

Sunday, October 26, 2025, 6:33 pm (JST) at Mizuho PayPay Dome in Fukuoka, Fukuoka Prefecture
Team	1	2	3	4	5	6	7	8	9	R	H	E
Hanshin	1	0	0	0	0	0	0	0	0	1	6	0
SoftBank	3	6	0	0	1	0	0	0	X	10	14	0
WP: Naoyuki Uwasawa (1–0) LP: Jon Duplantier (0–1); Home runs: HAN: None; SOF: Hotaka Yamakawa (1); Attendance: 36,910; Boxscore

Sponsor Sumitomo Mitsui Banking Corporation's corporate mascot, Midosuke, threw out the ceremonial first pitch. Naoyuki Uwasawa started Game 2 for the Hawks while Jon Duplantier started for the Tigers. Hanshin took a 1–0 lead in the top of the first inning with an RBI single by Teruaki Sato, but the Hawks scored three runs in the bottom of the first inning all with two outs. Ryoya Kurihara first tied the game with an RBI single and then a two-run double by Hotaka Yamakawa gave the Hawks a two-run lead. The Hawks added six more runs in the second inning, starting with an RBI triple by Ukyo Shuto, who later scored on a wild pitch. Kensuke Kondo then hit an RBI double, driving Duplantier from the game, and Yamakawa followed with a two-run home run off Yuta Iwasada. Duplantier allowed seven runs in 1 2/3 innings in his first appearance since August 9. He gave up six hits and walked three batters.

Iwasada left the game in the third inning after being hit by a ball that loaded the bases. Making his first postseason appearance, rookie Takato Ihara entered the game and induced Kondo to ground out, ending the inning. Ihara continued pitching, retiring all three batters in the fourth and striking out the first two in the fifth. The Hawks then recorded consecutive hits to put runners on first and third, and a wild pitch by Ihara allowed another run to score. The Hawks finished the game with 14 hits. Five of those hits came from Shuto, who set the record for most hits in a single Japan Series game. Uwasawa pitched six innings for the Hawks to earn the win and help put an end to their five-game Japan Series losing streak dating back to last year.

=== Game 3 ===
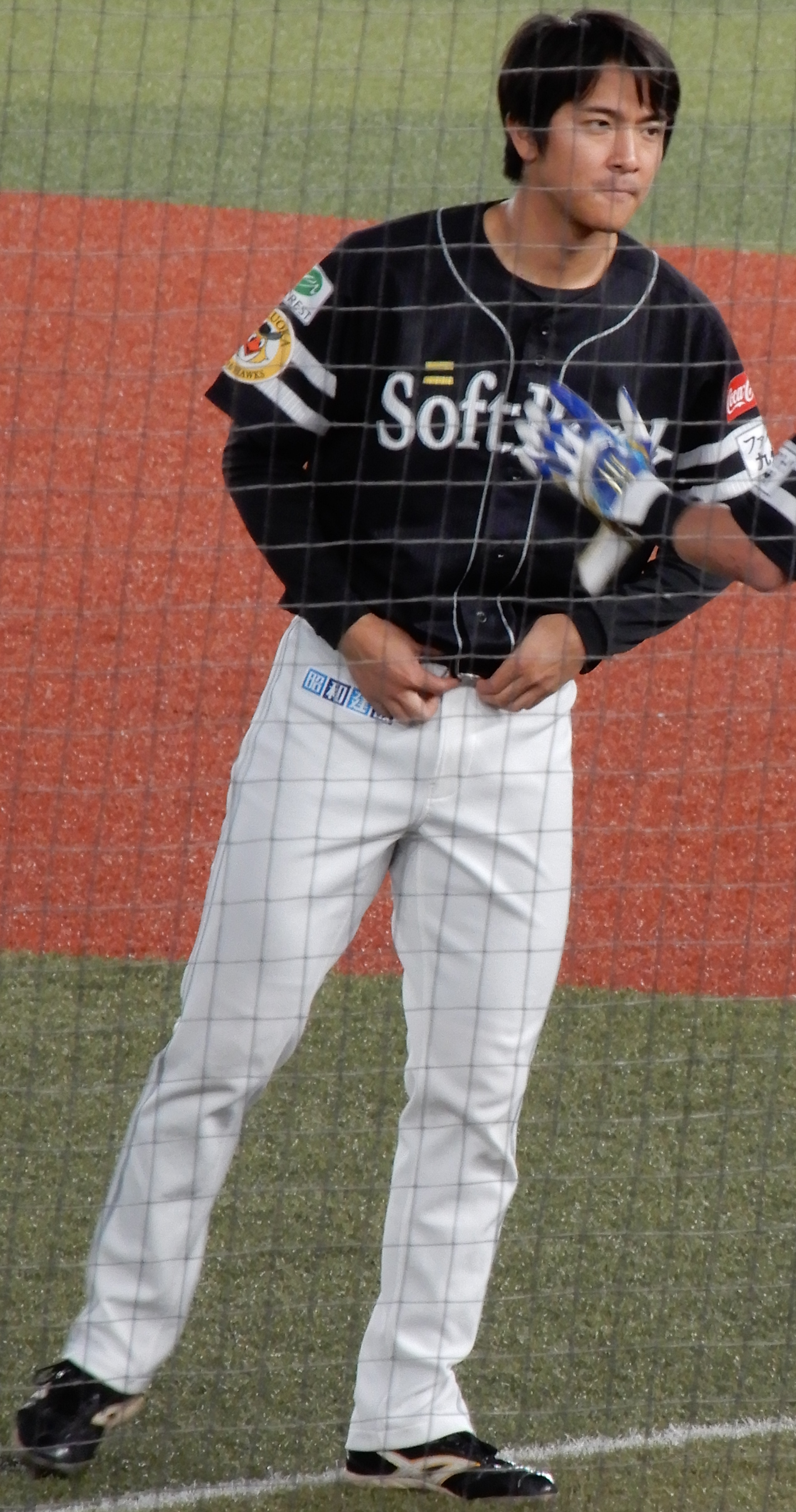
Tatsuru Yanagimachi hit a game-winning RBI triple in Game 3.

Tuesday, October 28, 2025, 6:04 pm (JST) at Koshien Stadium in Nishinomiya, Hyōgo Prefecture
Team	1	2	3	4	5	6	7	8	9	R	H	E
SoftBank	0	0	0	1	0	1	0	0	0	2	6	2
Hanshin	1	0	0	0	0	0	0	0	0	1	6	0
WP: Liván Moinelo (1–0) LP: Hiroto Saiki (0–1) Sv: Kazuki Sugiyama (1); Home runs: SOF: Hotaka Yamakawa (2); HAN: None; Attendance: 41,594; Boxscore

Singer Wakadanna of the reggae group Shonan no Kaze performed the Japanese national anthem and the Hanshin Tigers Junior Team threw out the ceremonial first pitch before Game 3. SoftBank started pitcher Liván Moinelo, while Hanshin started Hiroto Saiki. The Tigers took an early lead when Teruaki Sato hit an RBI double in the first inning, his third straight game with an RBI. Hotaka Yamakawa then hit a home run for the second straight game for the Hawks that tied the game at 1–1 in the fourth inning. In the bottom half of the fourth, Hanshin had runners on first and second with one out but were unable to score. They threatened again in the sixth inning when they their first two batters drew walked, one intentionally, but Moinelo was again able to pitch out of the inning with the help of a spectacular catch by shortstop Kenta Imamiya to end the inning.

In SoftBank's half of the sixth inning, Yuki Yanagita singled to open the inning and advanced to second base on a sacrifice bunt by Ukyo Shuto. Tatsuru Yanagimachi hit an RBI triple off of Saiki to score Yanagita and give the Hawks the lead. After walking Yamakawa to put runners on first and third bases, Saiki was relieved by Masaki Oyokawa who got Ryoya Kurihara to hit into an inning-ending double play. Hanshin's Saiki pitched 5 1/3 innings, striking out seven and walking three and allowed both SoftBank runs. Moinelo allowed one run on four hits, striking out six batters and walking two in six innings pitched. Ryuhei Obata opened the seventh inning for the Tigers by reaching base on an error by Yamakawa and then reached third with only one out via a stolen base and a passed ball. Koya Fujii prevented a run, however, by striking out Koji Chikamoto and Takumu Nakano to finish the inning. Hawks relief pitchers Fujii, Yuki Matsumoto, and Kazuki Sugiyama kept the Tigers from scoring for the remainder of the game to secure the victory.

=== Game 4 ===
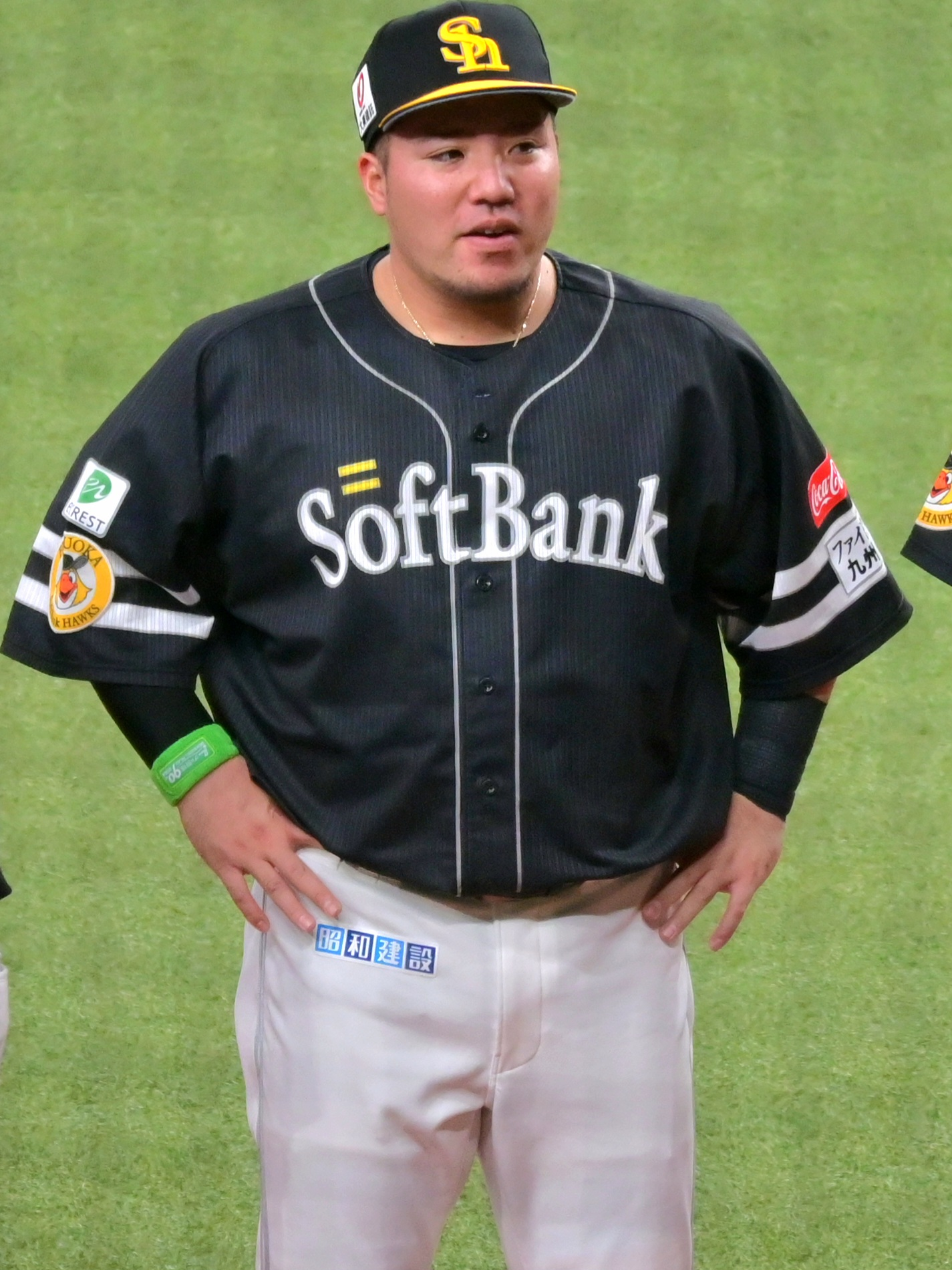
Hotaka Yamakawa hit home runs in Games 2, 3, and 4.

Wednesday, October 29, 2025, 6:01 pm (JST) at Koshien Stadium in Nishinomiya, Hyōgo Prefecture
Team	1	2	3	4	5	6	7	8	9	R	H	E
SoftBank	0	1	0	0	1	1	0	0	0	3	9	3
Hanshin	0	0	0	0	0	0	0	2	0	2	6	0
WP: Ryosuke Ohtsu (1–0) LP: Haruto Takahashi (0–1) Sv: Kazuki Sugiyama (2); Home runs: SOF: Hotaka Yamakawa (3); HAN: None; Attendance: 41,591; Boxscore

Iroha Nagata, captain of the Japan women's national rugby union team, threw out the ceremonial first pitch. The starting pitchers for Game 4 were Ryosuke Ohtsu for the Hawks and Haruto Takahashi for the Tigers. Hotaka Yamakawa hit a solo home run for the Hawks in the second inning to open the game's scoring. In the fifth inning, Ohtsu drew a one-out walk and Yuki Yanagita singled to left. Ukyo Shuto then hit a ball back toward the mound and struck Takahashi in the left elbow. The hit loaded the bases and prompted Takahashi's removal from the game. He had struck out five and walked one. Reliever Seishu Hatake then gave up a sacrifice fly to Tatsuru Yanagimachi to give SoftBank another run. He walked Yamakawa to again load the bases but struck out Ryoya Kurihara to end the inning.

Ohtsu had kept Hanshin scoreless through five innings, allowing only three hits. SoftBank's Taisei Makihara hit a single in the sixth inning and advanced to second base via a sacrifice bunt. Even though he had thrown just 59 pitches heading into the sixth inning, Ohtsu was removed from the game with a 2–0 lead and replaced by Kensuke Kondo as a pinch hitter. Kondo had started as the Hawks designated hitter in the first two games of the series at home but was unable to at Koshien where the designated hitter rule was not in effect. He capitalized on his first hitting opportunity in two games by hitting an RBI single to score Makihara. The Tigers scored two runs in the eighth inning after Koji Chikamoto hit a single and Takumu Nakano drew a walk, followed by an RBI single by Teruaki Sato and an RBI groundout by Yusuke Oyama bringing Hanshin within one run. Kazuki Sugiyama didn't allow a run in the ninth inning, however, and the Hawks won 3–2.

=== Game 5 ===
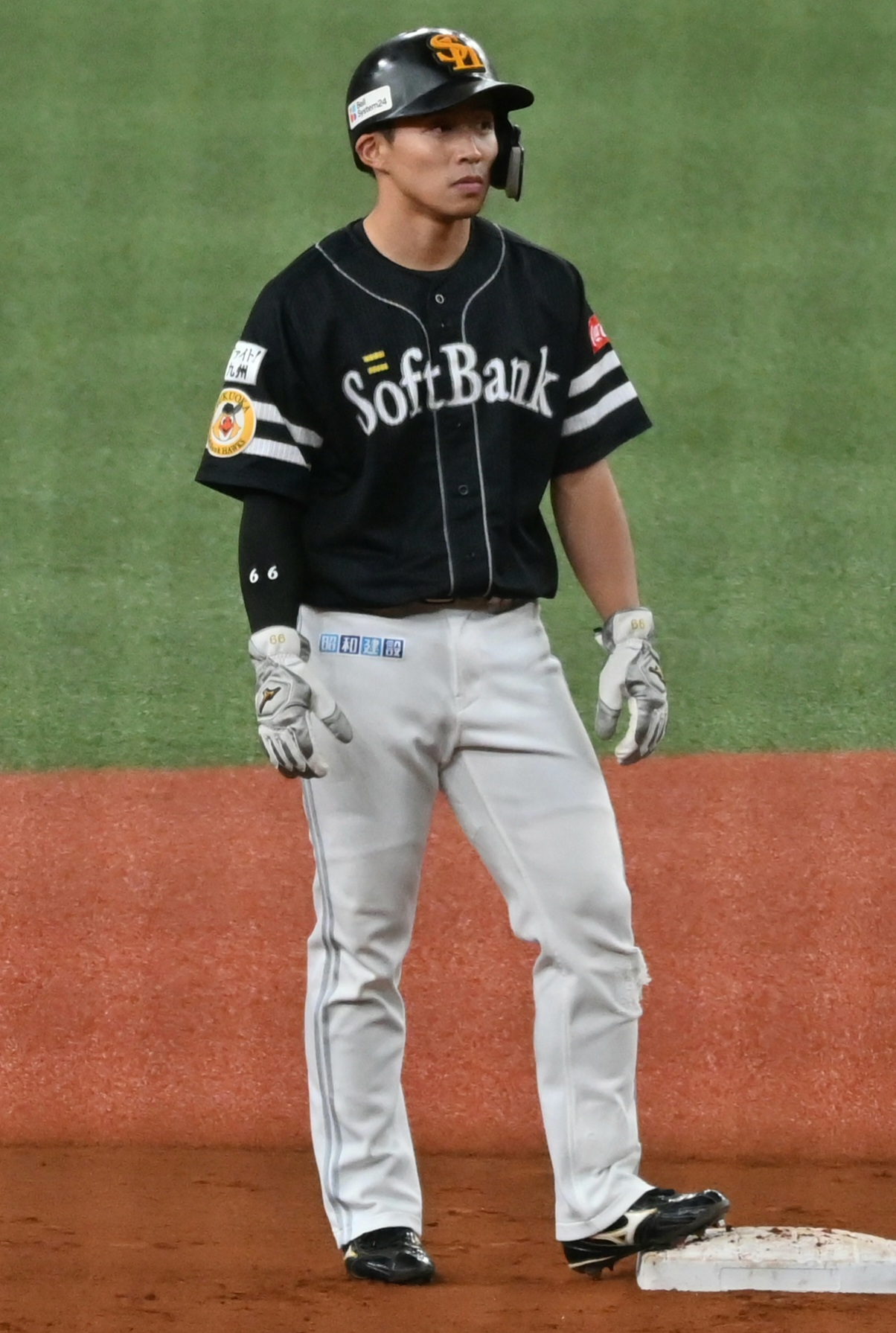
Isami Nomura hit a game-winning home run in the 11th inning in Game 5.

Thursday, October 30, 2025, 6:00 pm (JST) at Koshien Stadium in Nishinomiya, Hyōgo Prefecture
Team	1	2	3	4	5	6	7	8	9	10	11	R	H	E
SoftBank	0	0	0	0	0	0	0	2	0	0	1	3	10	0
Hanshin	0	1	0	0	1	0	0	0	0	0	0	2	8	1
WP: Kazuki Sugiyama (1–0) LP: Shoki Murakami (1–1) Sv: Yuki Matsumoto (1); Home runs: SOF: Yuki Yanagita (1), Isami Nomura (1); HAN: None; Attendance: 41,606; Boxscore

The matchup pitted Hanshin's Kotaro Otake against Softbank's Kohei Arihara. Seishiro Sakamoto gave the Tigers an early lead on an RBI single in the second inning while Teruaki Sato increased the lead with a line drive single in the fifth inning. Otake pitched six scoreless innings for the Tigers. However, Yuki Yanagita hit a two-run home run in the eighth inning off of reliever Daichi Ishii, who hadn't given up a run since April 4 and hadn't given up a home run since July 13, 2023, to tie the game for the Hawks, eventually sending the game to extra innings. Isami Nomura hit a leadoff home run in the 11th inning to give the Hawks a 3–2 lead. The Tigers got a baserunner in the bottom of the 11th but failed to score a run, clinching the Hawks' first Japan Series title in five years.

== Aftermath ==
The Hawks' series win was their first championship title in five years and twelfth overall, putting them within one championship of the Saitama Seibu Lions for the most Japan Series championships by a Pacific League team. After Game 5, Hotaka Yamakawa was named the Japan Series Most Valuable Player. He batted 5-for-13 with three home runs, seven RBIs, and six walks for the series. His three home runs came in three consecutive games, (Games 2, 3, and 4) tying the Japan Series record. Teruaki Sato batted 7-for-19 with five RBIs and won the Fighting Spirit Award, given to the best player on the losing team. Sato recorded his RBIs across all five games, tying a Japan Series record for most consecutive games with an RBI, and the only player to record one in every game played in the series. SoftBank's Yuki Yanagita, Kazuki Sugiyama, and Koya Fujii were all named as recipients of the Outstanding Player Award. Hawks' captain Yanagita was also voted the SMBC Everyone's Cheering Award winner by fans.

== Media coverage ==
The Japan Series was televised in Japan by a variety of television stations and streaming services. Three of the seven games were broadcast by NHK-BS, with TBS, Fuji TV, Nippon News Network, Asahi Broadcasting Corporation, and TV Asahi also carrying some games. All games were streamed online via TVer, with U-Next, Hulu, Abema, FOD, and Fuji TV ONEsmart also streaming some games. Along with the networks' commentators, various former NPB players, coaches and managers were also providing commentary during game broadcasts.

Game	Networks	Streaming	Commentators	Ref
1	TBS	U-Next, TVer	Koji Akiyama, Hiromi Makihara, Ken Iguchi	
2	Fuji TV, NHK-BS	Fuji TV ONEsmart, FOD, TVer	Shingo Takatsu, Takashi Toritani, Nobuhiro Matsuda, Chikafusa Ikeda, Yohei Takeshita	
3	TBS, NHK-BS	U-Next, TVer	Masayuki Kakefu, Kazuhiro Sasaki, Seiichi Uchikawa, Masao Inoue	
4	NNN	Hulu, TVer	Norihiro Akahoshi, Seiichi Uchikawa, Shoma Hiramatsu	
5	ABC	Abema, TVer	Akinobu Okada, Munenori Kawasaki, Junichi Takano	

== See also ==
- 2025 World Series
- 2025 Korean Series
