= Ren Fukushima =

Japanese baseball player (born 2003)

Ren Fukushima 福島 蓮
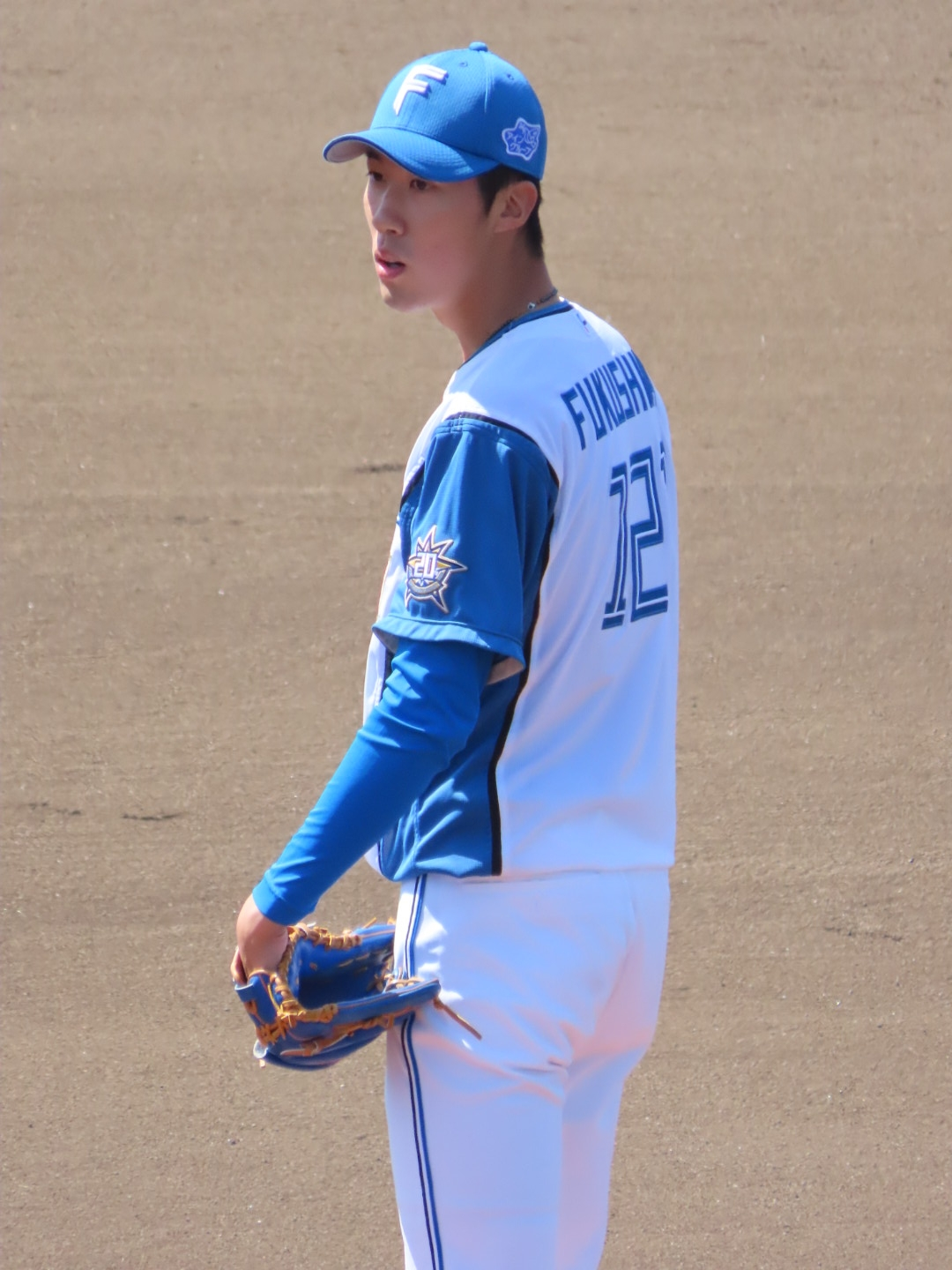

Hokkaido Nippon-Ham Fighters – No. 45
- Pitcher
- Born: April 25, 2003 (age 22); Hachinohe, Aomori, Japan
- Bats: Right Throws: Right

NPB debut
- April 17, 2024, for the Hokkaido Nippon-Ham Fighters

Career statistics (through 2025 season)
- Win–loss record: 7-3
- Earned Run Average: 3.00
- Strikeouts: 72
- Saves: 0
- Holds: 0

Teams
- Hokkaido Nippon-Ham Fighters (2022–present)

Ren Fukushima (福島 蓮, Fukushima Ren; born April 25, 2003 in Hachinohe, Aomori, Japan) is a Japanese professional baseball pitcher for the Hokkaido Nippon-Ham Fighters of Nippon Professional Baseball (NPB).
