= Isami Nomura =

Japanese baseball player (born 1996)

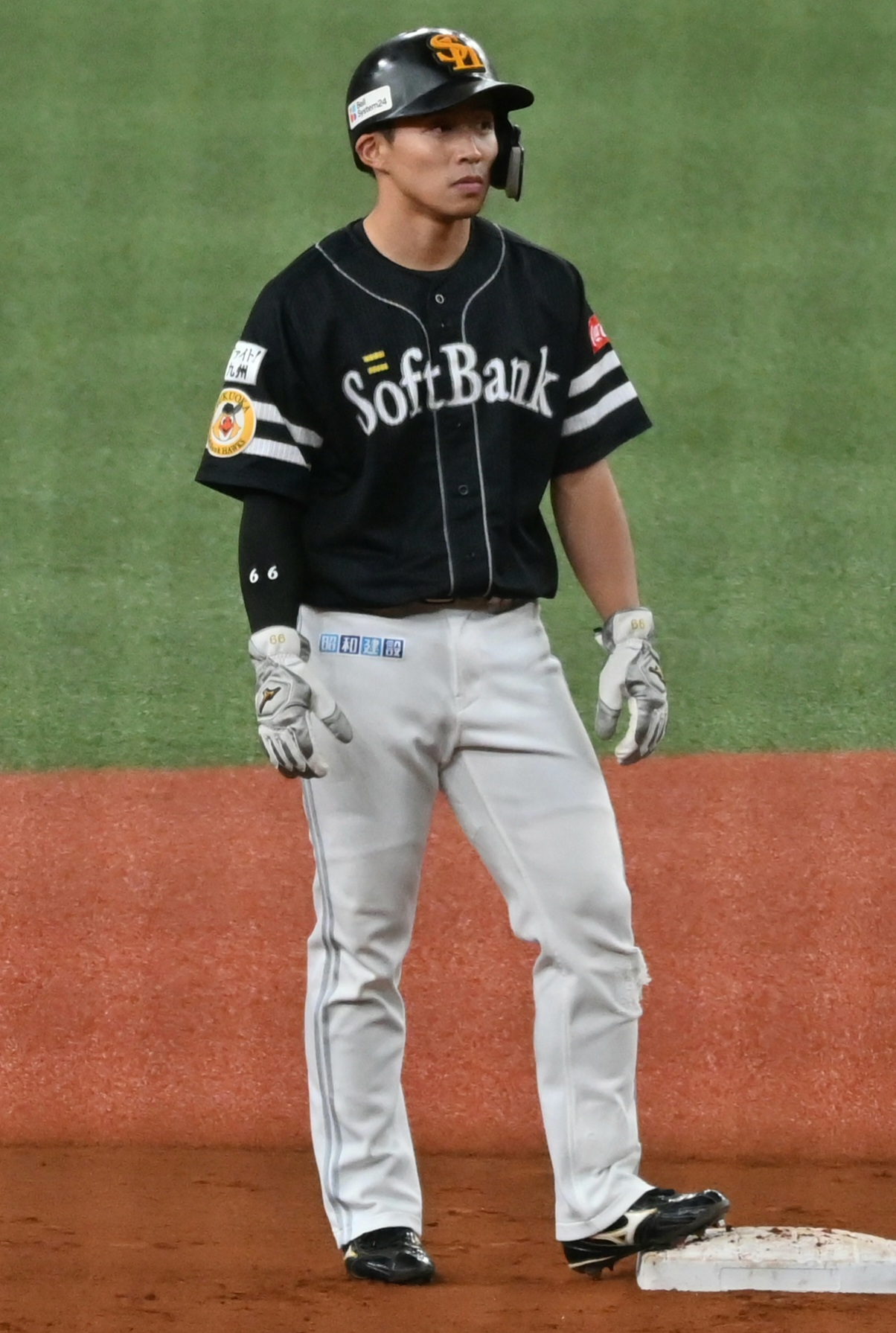
- Nomura with the Fukuoka SoftBank Hawks.

Fukuoka SoftBank Hawks – No. 99
- Infielder
- Born: December 1, 1996 (age 29); Kobe, Hyōgo, Japan
- Bats: Right Throws: Right

NPB debut
- March 25, 2022, for the Fukuoka SoftBank Hawks

NPB statistics (through 2025 season)
- Batting average: .240
- Home runs: 25
- Runs batted in: 73

Teams
- Fukuoka SoftBank Hawks (2022–present)

Career highlights and awards
- Japan Series champion (2025)

Isami Nomura (野村 勇, Nomura Isami; born December 1, 1996) is a Japanese professional baseball infielder for the Fukuoka SoftBank Hawks of Nippon Professional Baseball (NPB).

== Professional career ==
On October 11, 2021, Nomura was drafted by the Fukuoka Softbank Hawks in the 2021 Nippon Professional Baseball draft.

On March 25, 2022, Nomura made his first league debut in the Pacific League against the Hokkaido Nippon-Ham Fighters as a pinch runner.

On March 29 He recorded his first stolen base against the Chiba Lotte Marines On April 6, he played as a no.2 and left field against the Orix Buffaloes and recorded his first hit. He also recorded his first home run on April 21 against the Buffaloes.

On August 21, Nomura hit two home runs against the Hokkaido Nippon-Ham Fighters, bringing his total to 10. It was the first time a rookie player had hit a 10 homers since Masataka Yoshida in 2016 and the first Hawks team record in 83 years, since Kazuto Tsuruoka did it in 1939.

On October 2 against the Chiba Lotte Marines, he recorded 10 stole bases, becoming the first rookie player to hit a 10 home runs and a 10 stolen bases in the Pacific League in 37 years since Hiromitu Kumano in 1985.

In 2022 season, he finished the regular season with a .239 batting average, 10 home runs, 25 runs batted in, and 10 stolen bases in 97 games as a rookie player.

In 2023 season, Nomura has been suffering from lower back pain since spring training and underwent lower back surgery on March 31. As a result, he spent the first half of the season undergoing rehabilitation, and finished the season with a batting average of .160, a 3 home runs, and a 7 RBIs in 50 games.
