= Shū Yamagata =

Japanese baseball player (born 2002)

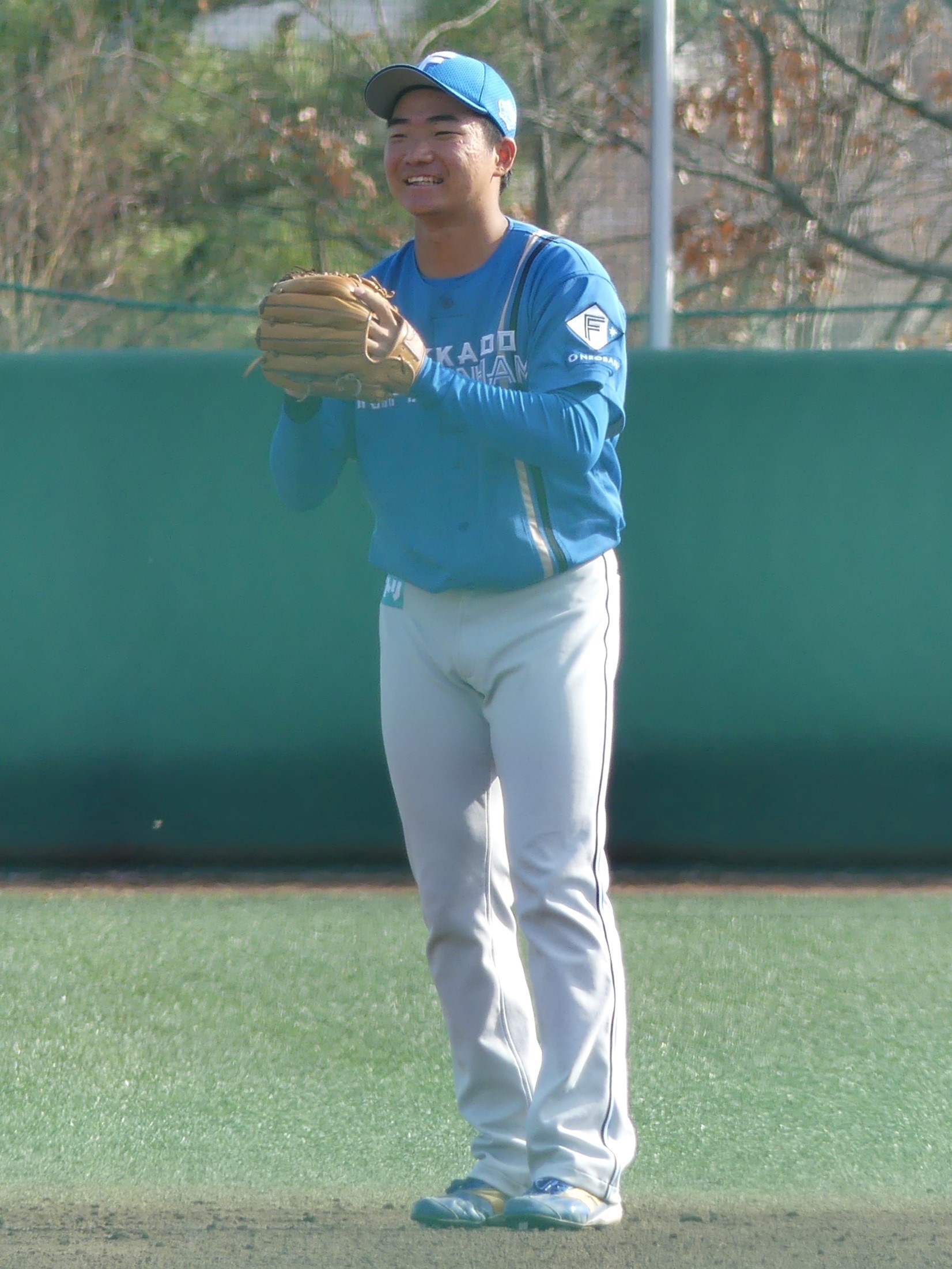

Hokkaido Nippon-Ham Fighters – No. 54
- Infielder
- Born: May 1, 2002 (age 23); Kokubunji, Tokyo, Japan
- Bats: Right Throws: Right

NPB debut
- April 15, 2025, for the Hokkaido Nippon-Ham Fighters

NPB statistics (through 2025 season)
- Batting average: .232
- Hits: 43
- Home runs: 3
- Runs batted in: 11
- Stolen base: 3
- Stats at Baseball Reference

Teams
- Hokkaido Nippon-Ham Fighters (2025–present)

Shū Yamagata (山縣 秀, Yamagata Shū; born May 1, 2002) is a Japanese professional baseball infielder for the Hokkaido Nippon-Ham Fighters in Nippon Professional Baseball.
