= Daichi Ishii =

Japanese baseball player (born 1997)

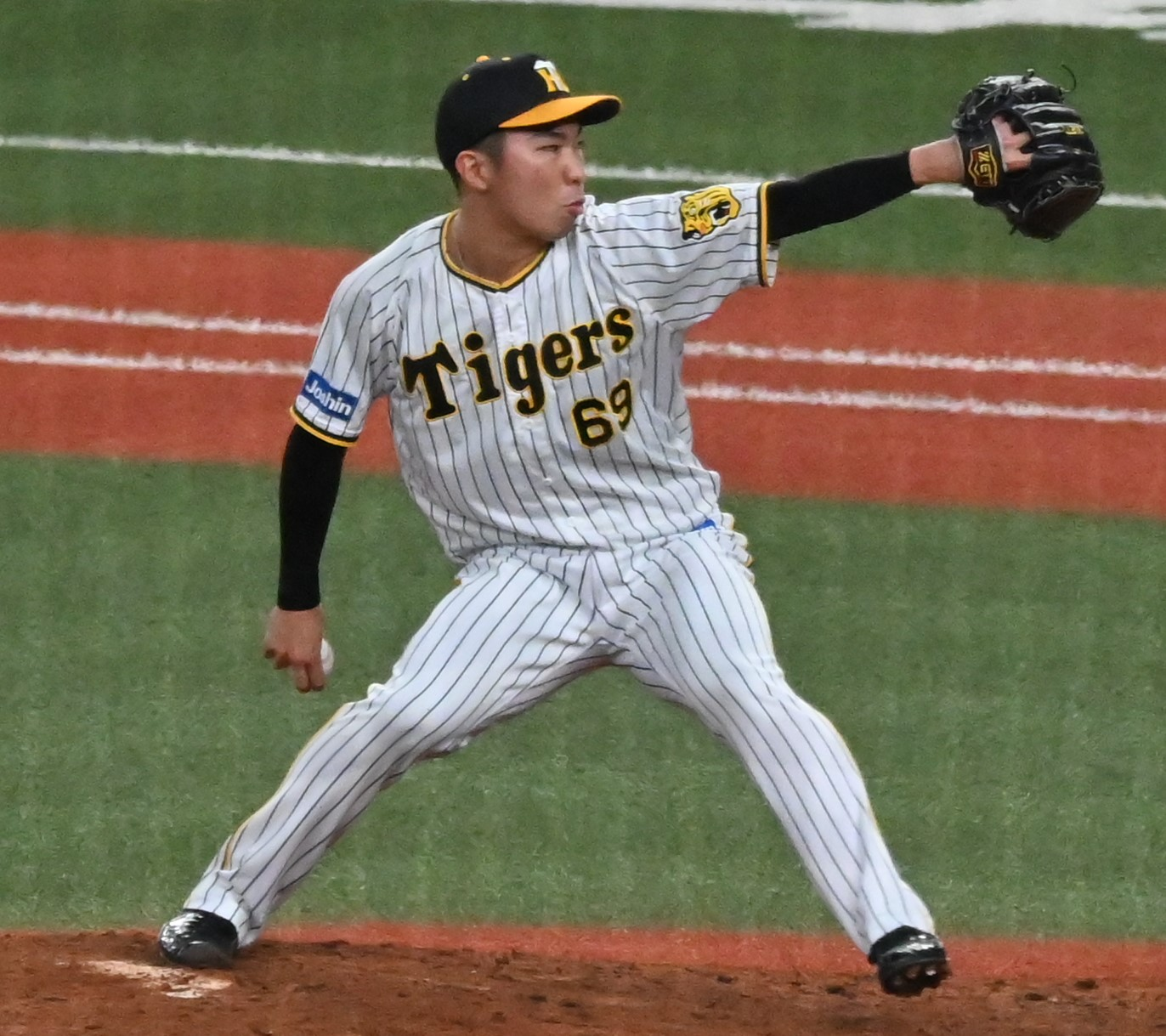

Hanshin Tigers – No. 69
- Pitcher
- Born: July 29, 1997 (age 29); Akita, Akita, Japan
- Bats: Right Throws: Right

NPB debut
- March 26, 2021, for the Hanshin Tigers

NPB statistics (through 2025 season)
- Win–loss record: 6–4
- Earned run average: 1.43
- Strikeouts: 169
- Saves: 10
- Holds: 85
- Stats at Baseball Reference

Teams
- Hanshin Tigers (2021–present)

Career highlights and awards
- Japan Series champion (2023); NPB All-Star (2025); NPB records: 50 consecutive scoreless appearances

Daichi Ishii (石井 大智, Ishii Daichi; born July 29, 1997) is a Japanese professional baseball pitcher for the Hanshin Tigers of Nippon Professional Baseball (NPB).
