= Hotaka Yamakawa =

Japanese baseball player (born 1991)

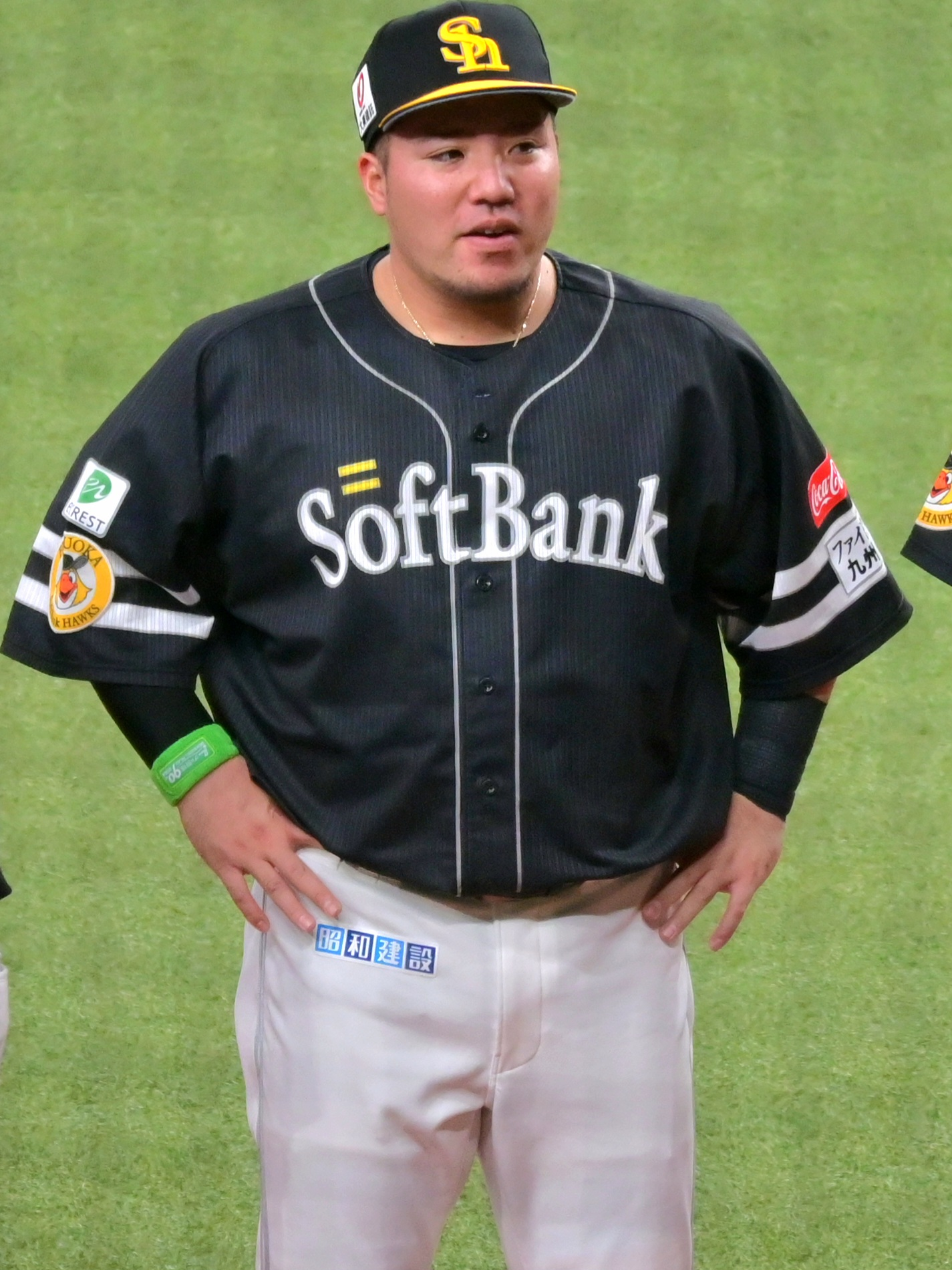
- Yamakawa with the Fukuoka SoftBank Hawks in 2024

Fukuoka SoftBank Hawks – No. 5
- First baseman
- Born: November 23, 1991 (age 34); Naha, Okinawa, Japan
- Bats: Right Throws: Right

NPB debut
- June 21, 2014, for the Saitama Seibu Lions

NPB statistics (through 2025 season)
- Batting average: .251
- Home runs: 275
- Runs batted in: 736
- Stats at Baseball Reference

Teams
- Saitama Seibu Lions (2014–2023); Fukuoka SoftBank Hawks (2024–present)

Career highlights and awards
- Japan Series champion (2025); Japan Series Most Valuable Player Award (2025); Pacific League MVP (2018); 6× NPB All-Star (2018, 2019, 2021, 2022, 2024, 2025); 4× Pacific League home run leader (2018, 2019, 2022, 2024); Pacific League RBI leader 2× (2022, 2024); 3× Pacific League Best Nine Award (2018, 2019, 2022); Hochi Professional Sports Award (2018)
Medals
Men's baseball
Representing Japan
World Baseball Classic
Gold medal – first place	2023 Miami	Team

Hotaka Yamakawa (山川 穂高, Yamakawa Hotaka; born November 23, 1991) is a Japanese professional baseball infielder for the Fukuoka SoftBank Hawks of Nippon Professional Baseball (NPB). He has previously played in NPB for the Saitama Seibu Lions. Yamakawa led the Pacific League in home runs in 2018, 2019, 2022, and 2024.

== Career ==
He was selected for the Pacific League all star team for the 2018 NPB All-Star game. On October 10, 2018, he was selected by the Japan national baseball team to play for them at the 2018 MLB Japan All-Star Series. He was also selected by Samurai Japan to play for them during the 2023 World Baseball Classic, winning gold with them.

Yamakawa batted 5-for-13 with three home runs, seven RBIs, and six walks for the 2025 Japan Series. He won the Japan Series Most Valuable Player Award. His three home runs came in three consecutive games, (Games 2, 3, and 4) tying the Japan Series record.

== Sexual assault allegations ==
On May 11, 2023, it was reported from Bunshun Online that the Tokyo Metropolitan Police Department was investigating Yamakawa for sexually assaulting a female acquaintance at a hotel in Tokyo in November 2022. Bunshun Online reported that said female acquaintance had suffered bleeding injuries from the vagina and other parts of the body, and that the police had received a damage report on suspicion of indecent assault and rape. However, Yamakawa stated that all was consensual and he had relations with the woman. In response to this, on May 12, the Lions removed Yamakawa from their active roster indefinitely. On May 29, it was announced that Yamakawa would not face charges as a result of the allegations.
