= Ukyo Shuto =

Japanese baseball player (born 1996)

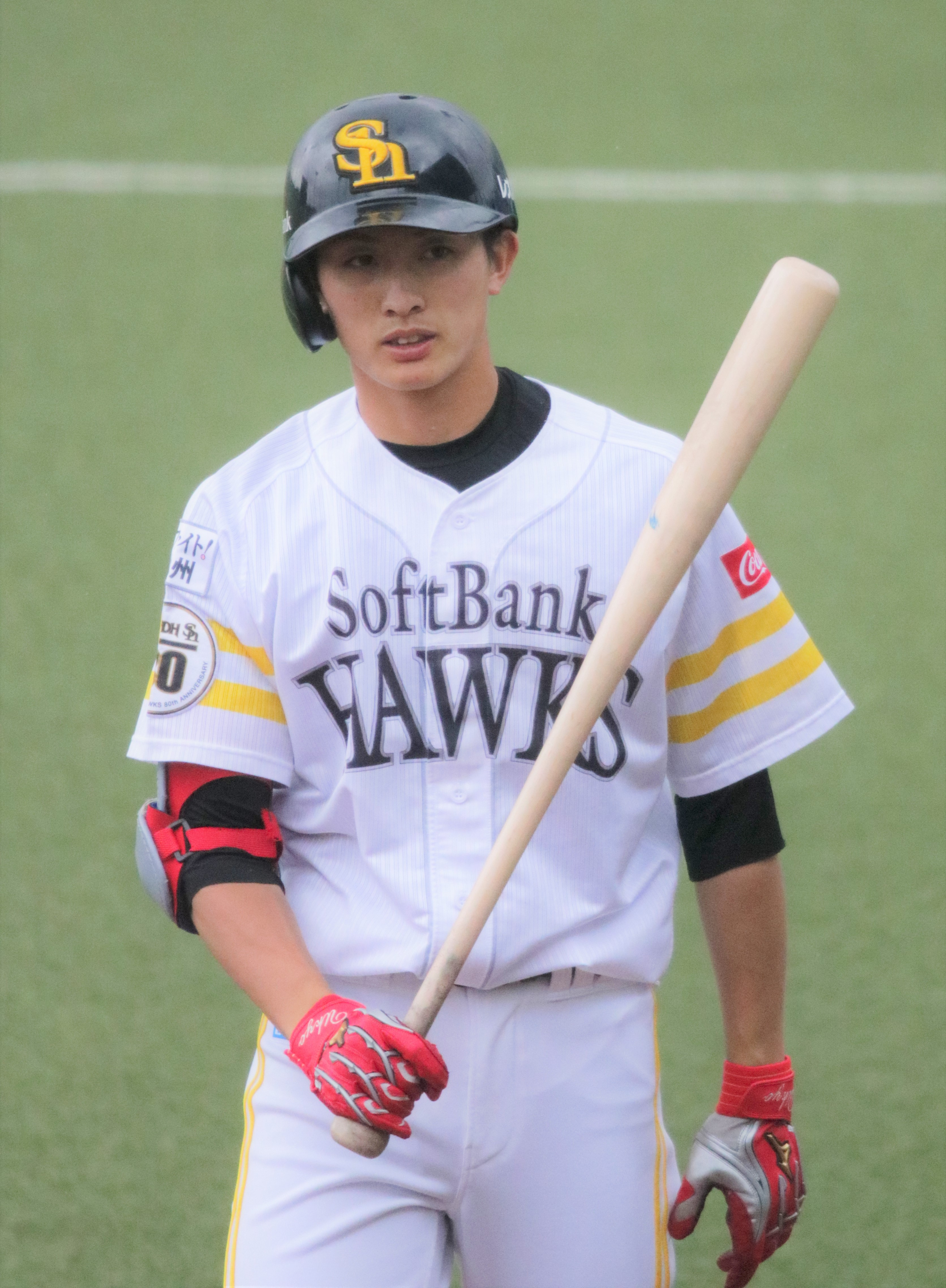
- Shuto with the Fukuoka SoftBank Hawks

Fukuoka SoftBank Hawks – No. 23
- Infielder / Outfielder
- Born: February 10, 1996 (age 30); Ōta, Gunma, Japan
- Bats: Left Throws: Right

NPB debut
- April 7, 2019, for the Fukuoka SoftBank Hawks

NPB statistics (through June 6, 2026)
- Batting average: .260
- Home runs: 18
- Runs batted in: 147
- Stolen bases: 244
- Stats at Baseball Reference

Teams
- Fukuoka SoftBank Hawks (2018–present)

Career highlights and awards
- 4× Japan Series champion (2019–2020, 2025–2026); 2x NPB All-Star (2024, 2025); 2× Pacific League Stolen bases Leader (2020, 2023); NPB Commissioner's Special Award
Medals
Men's baseball
Representing Japan
World Baseball Classic
Gold medal – first place	2023 Miami	Team
WBSC Premier12
Gold medal – first place	2019 Tokyo	Team
U-23 Baseball World Cup
Silver medal – second place	2018 Barranquilla	Team

Ukyo Shuto (周東 佑京, Shūtō Ukyō; born February 10, 1996) is a Japanese professional baseball infielder and outfielder for the Fukuoka SoftBank Hawks of Nippon Professional Baseball (NPB).

In 2020, Shuto set a record by stealing a base in 13 consecutive games.

== Amateur career ==
Shuto participated three times in the Japan National Collegiate Baseball Championship and once in the Meiji Shrine Baseball Championship while studying at the Tokyo University of Agriculture Hokkaido Okhotsk.

In 2017, Shuto was selected as the most valuable player in the Hokkaido Universities Baseball League.

== Professional career ==
On October 26, 2017, Shuto was drafted as a developmental player by the Fukuoka SoftBank Hawks in the 2017 Nippon Professional Baseball draft.

In 2018 season, he played in informal matches against the Shikoku Island League Plus's teams and amateur baseball teams, and played in the Western League of NPB's second leagues. On October 3, despite being a developmental player, he was selected as the Japan national baseball team for the 2018 U-23 Baseball World Cup because of his speed and defense.

On March 26, 2019, Shuto signed a 6 million yen contract with the Fukuoka SoftBank Hawks as a registered player under control. In the 2019 season, he played mainly as a defensive player and a pinch runner and recorded 25 stolen bases while being caught five times while batting .196/.212/.294 in 102 at bats.

On October 30, 2020, Shuto achieved 13 games consecutive stolen bases, breaking the NPB record for Yutaka Fukumoto's 11 games consecutive stolen bases in 1974 and the MLB record for 12 games consecutive stolen bases for Bert Campaneris in 1969. In 2020 season, Shuto won the Pacific League stolen bases leader award with a record of 50 stolen bases, and hitting .270/.325/.352 in 307 at bats, with a one home run, a 27 RBIs. In the 2020 Japan Series against the Yomiuri Giants, Shuto contributed to the team's fourth consecutive Japan Series championship with one hit, one stolen base and good defense. December 17, Shuto was honored for the Pacific League Stolen bases Leader Award and NPB Commissioner's Special Award at the NPB AWARD 2020.

In the 2021 season, he had played in the season opener, but on June 10 he broke the index finger of his right hand and was dropped from the first team registration. He also underwent surgery on his right shoulder on September 10, the team announced. Because of this, he only played in 70 games, finishing the season with a .201 batting average, three home runs, five runs batted in, and 21 stolen bases.

On June 7, 2022, Shuto recorded a total of 100 stolen bases in the interleague play against the Hanshin Tigers. He also hit his first walk-off home run on June 18 against the Tohoku Rakuten Golden Eagles and his first lead-off home run on August 4 against the Hokkaido Nippon-Ham Fighters. In 2022 season, he finished the regular season with a .267 batting average, five home runs, a 15 RBI, and a 22 stolen bases in 80 games.

On April 11, 2023, Shuto recorded a three stolen bases in a game against the Hokkaido Nippon-Ham Fighters. He also recorded a total of 150 stolen bases in the against the Orix Buffaloes on September 23, 2023. Shuto played 114 games, and finished the season with a .241 batting average, a 2 home runs, a 36 stolen bases, and a 17 RBIs.

His 36 stolen bases are tied with Hiroto Kobukata for the top record in the Pacific League, and he was honored with the Pacific League Stolen bases Leader Award at NPB AWARD 2023 for the first time since the 2020 season.

== International career ==
On October 3, 2018, despite being a developmental player, he was selected as the Japan national baseball team for the 2018 U-23 Baseball World Cup because of his speed and defense.

On October 1, 2019, unusual case, Shuto was evaluated for base-running technique as a pinch runner and was selected as the Japan national baseball top team for the 2019 WBSC Premier12 tournament. He led the tournament with four stolen bases.

Shuto was called up to the Japan national baseball team for the Samurai Japan Series 2022 and recorded a stolen base against the Australia on November 10, 2022.

Shuto joined Samurai Japan for the 2023 World Baseball Classic, where he is remembered for scoring the winning run on a walk off double by Munetaka Murakami in the semifinals against Mexico. He was pinch running for Masataka Yoshida, who drew a walk the previous at-bat. He ran from first to home in 10.28 seconds, maxing at 30.4 feet per second.
