= Ryosuke Ohtsu =

Japanese baseball player (born 1999)

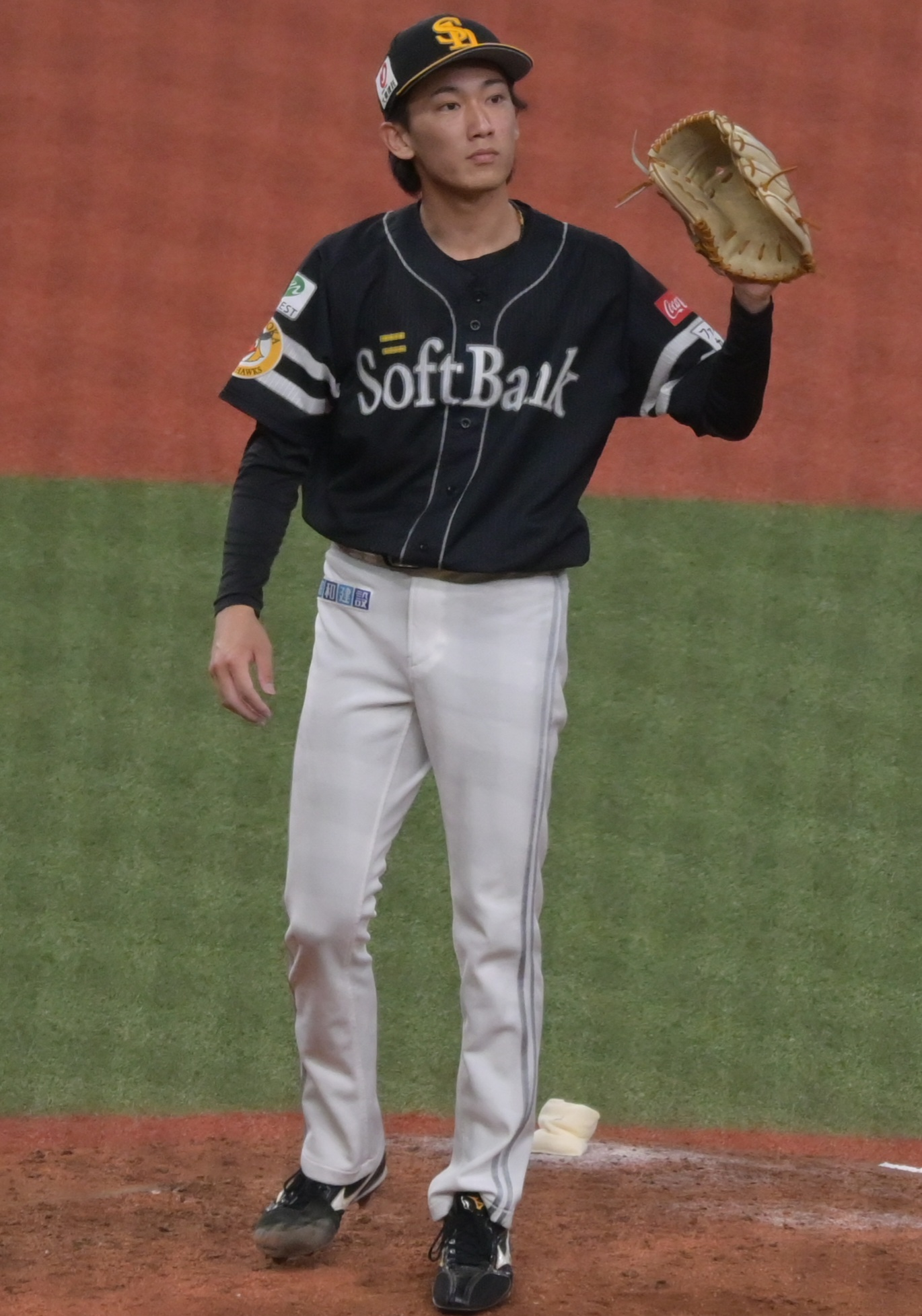
- Ohtsu with the Fukuoka SoftBank Hawks.

Fukuoka SoftBank Hawks – No. 19
- Pitcher
- Born: January 13, 1999 (age 27); Shime, Fukuoka, Japan
- Bats: Left Throws: Right

NPB debut
- April 1, 2023, for the Fukuoka SoftBank Hawks

NPB statistics (through 2025 season)
- Win–loss record: 15-9
- ERA: 2.51
- Strikeouts: 154
- Stats at Baseball Reference

Teams
- Fukuoka SoftBank Hawks (2023–present)

Career highlights and awards
- NPB All-Star (2024); Japan Series champion (2025)

Ryosuke Ohtsu (大津 亮介, Ohtsu Ryōsuke; born January 13, 1999) is a Japanese professional baseball pitcher for the Fukuoka SoftBank Hawks of Nippon Professional Baseball (NPB).

== Professional career ==
On October 20, 2022, Ohtsu was drafted second round pick by the Fukuoka SoftBank Hawks in the 2022 Nippon Professional Baseball draft.

On April 1, 2023, Ohtsu pitched his debut game against the Chiba Lotte Marines as a relief pitcher. He also recorded his first hold on April 27 against the Tohoku Rakuten Golden Eagles.

On June 18, in the interleague play against the Hanshin Tigers, Ohthu took he mound as a relief pitcher in the bottom of the 6th inning with the score 0-0 and a runner on second base, and with just one pitch he made a double play and ended the inning. The Hawks then scored, making him the winning pitcher for the first time. And he became the second pitcher in the NPB to win his first career winning pitcher after only one throw as a rookie.

In 2023 season, he finished the regular season with a 46 Games pitched, a 2–0 win–loss record, a 2.43 ERA, a 13 holds, a 21 strikeouts in 40.2 innings.
