= Tatsuru Yanagimachi =

Japanese baseball player (born 1997)

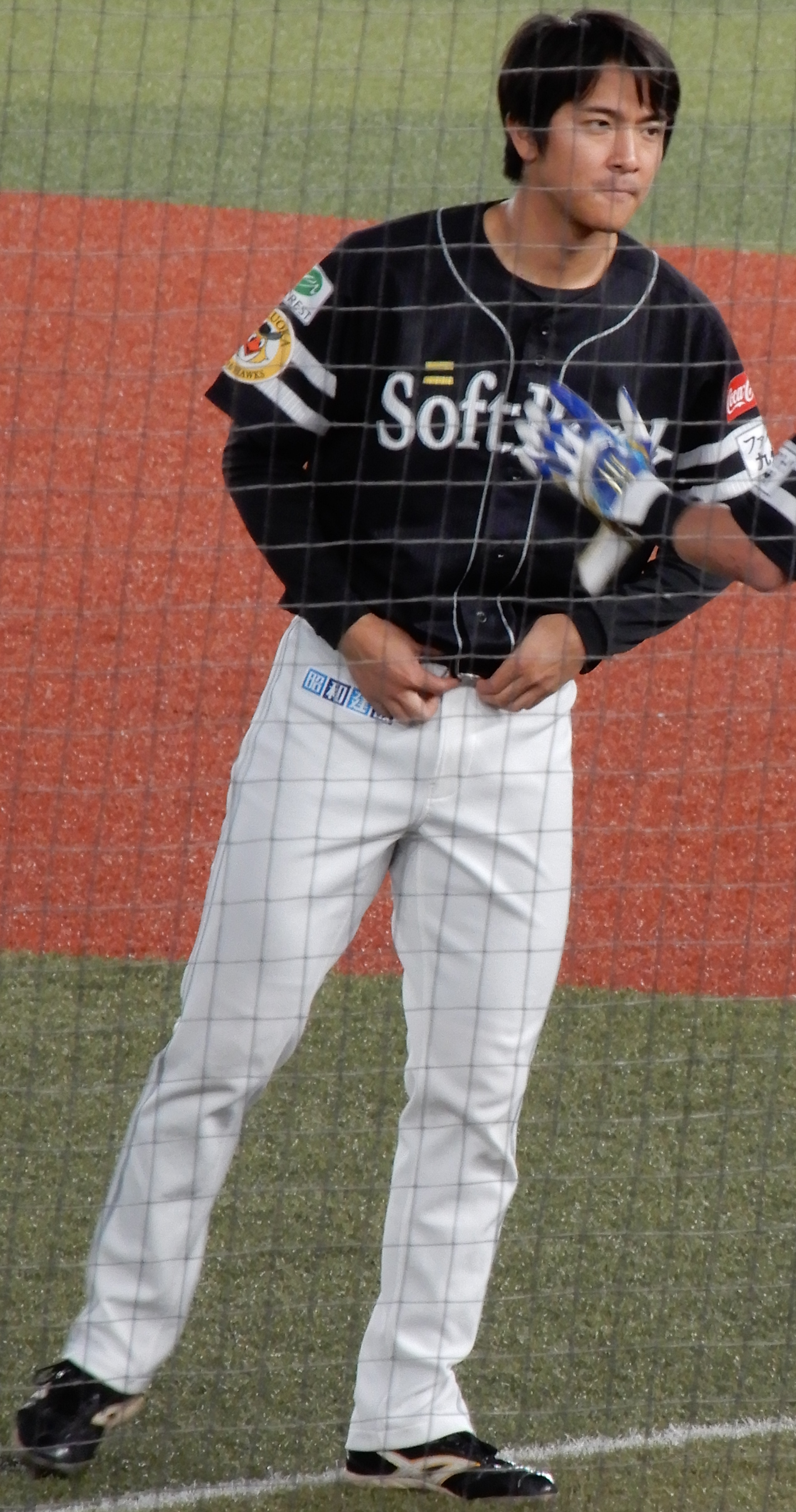
- Yanagimachi with the Fukuoka SoftBank Hawks.

Fukuoka SoftBank Hawks – No. 32
- Outfielder
- Born: April 20, 1997 (age 29); Inashiki, Ibaraki, Japan
- Bats: Left Throws: Right

NPB debut
- June 21, 2020, for the Fukuoka SoftBank Hawks

NPB statistics (through 2025 season)
- Batting average: .274
- Home runs: 11
- Runs batted in: 159
- Stats at Baseball Reference

Teams
- Fukuoka SoftBank Hawks (2020–present)

Career highlights and awards
- Pacific League Best Nine Award (2025); 2× Japan Series champion (2020, 2025); NPB All-Star (2025)
Medals
Men's baseball
Representing Japan
World University Baseball Championship
Gold medal – first place	2018 Chiayi	Team

Tatsuru Yanagimachi (柳町 達, Yanagimachi Tatsuru; born April 20, 1997) is a Japanese professional baseball outfielder for the Fukuoka SoftBank Hawks of Nippon Professional Baseball (NPB).

== Early baseball career ==
Yanagimachi went on to Keio University and was selected as the Best Nine Award in the Tokyo Big6 Baseball League in the first grade spring league. When he was in the 4th grade, he recorded a total of 100 hits, the 33rd in the history of the Tokyo Big6 Baseball League.

== Professional career ==
On October 17, 2019, Yanagimachi was drafted by the Fukuoka SoftBank Hawks in the 2019 Nippon Professional Baseball draft.

On June 21, 2020, Yanagimachi debuted in the Pacific League against the Chiba Lotte Marines. And on October 31, he recorded his first hit and RBI against the Saitama Seibu Lions. In 2020 season, Yanagimachi played 12 games in the Pacific League. And he was selected as the Japan Series roster in the 2020 Japan Series.

On June 8, 2021, Yanagimachi was named to the starting lineup for the first time in the interleague play against the Hiroshima Toyo Carp and recorded two hits. He also recorded his first home run against the Chiba Lotte Marines on October 25, and was the first multi-hit with three hits in one game. In 2021 season, he made 20 appearances in the Pacific League.

March 31, 2022, Ryoya Kurihara injured his left knee, so he was placed on the first team registration and had a multi-hit game that day against the Chiba Lotte Marines. He had since been used in the starting lineup at left fielder after Seiji Uebayashi injured his Achilles tendon on May 19. He continued his good form and reached the qualifying number of at bats in 29 games on May 31, ranking third in the league with a .317 batting average. But he was taken off the first team registration on June 6 due to a lower-body condition. He returned on June 17 and scored a run on a two-base hit against the Tohoku Rakuten Golden Eagles. He also tested positive for COVID-19, and by regulation was removed from the first team registration on August 20, with a return date of September 8. In 2022 season, he finished the regular season with a .277 batting average, 89 hits, and 32 RBI, playing in 107 games as a regular left fielder, the most of his career, despite suffering an accidental COVID-19 infection and a lower body condition.

In 2023 season, Yanagimachi became a regular left fielder by recording three RBIs, tied for the most in his career, in the interleague play against the Chunichi Dragons on June 1. He also scored the winning hit against the Hokkaido Nippon-Ham Fighters on September 18, ending his team's losing streak. He finished the regular season with a .257 batting average, 80 hits, and 34 RBIs batted in 116 games.

== International career ==
In 2018, Yanagimachi represented the Japan national baseball team at the 2018 World University Baseball Championship.

In 2019, Yanagimachi represented the Japan national baseball team at the 2019 USA VS Japan Collegiate All-Star Series.
