= 2025 Nippon Professional Baseball draft =

Japanese baseball draft event

2025 Nippon Professional Baseball Draft
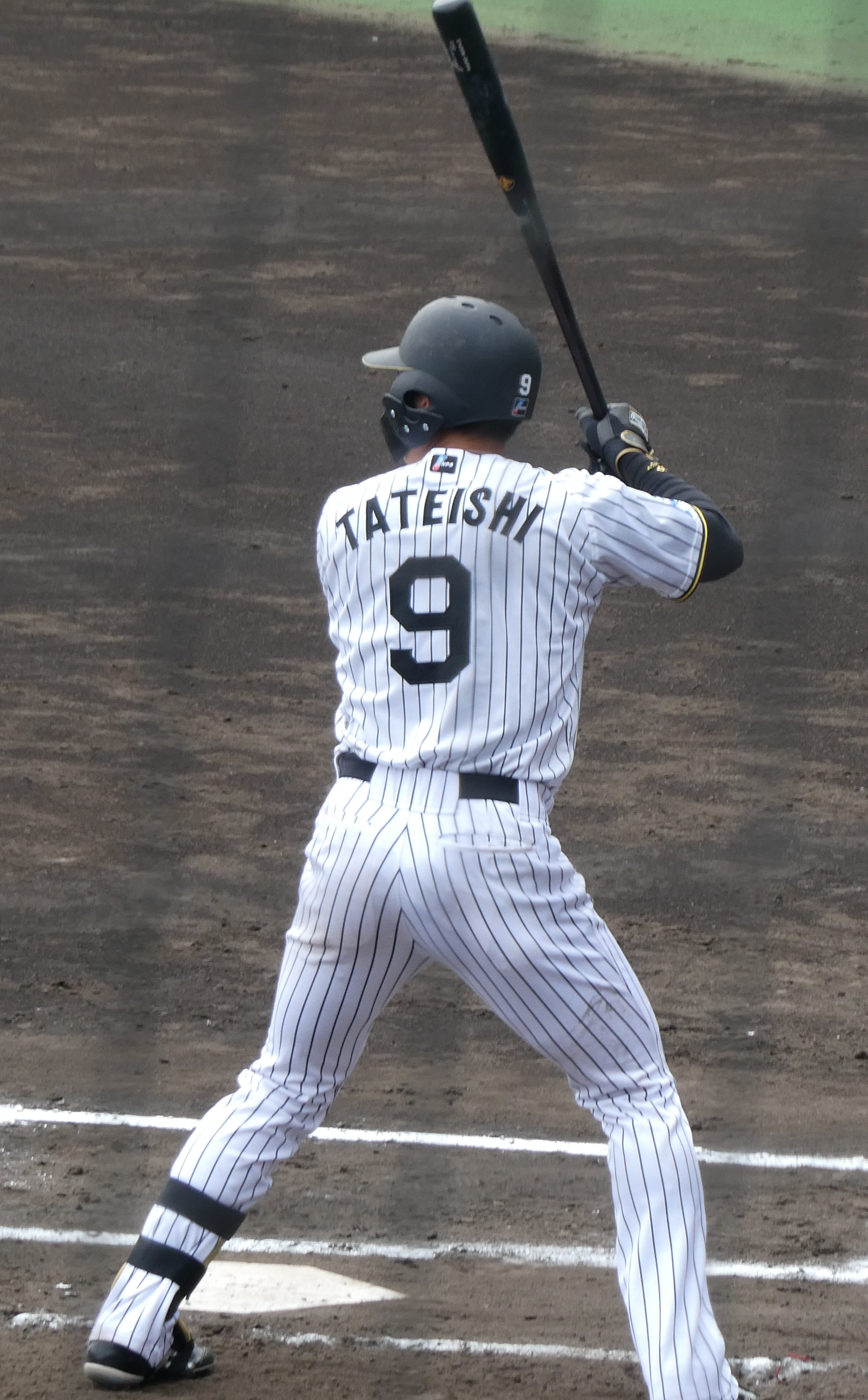
- Masahiro Tateishi, who was nominated by three different teams in the first round bid lottery.

General information
- Sport: Baseball
- Date: October 23, 2025
- Location: Grand Prince Hotel Takanawa, Tokyo
- Networks: TBS (first round), sky-A
- Sponsored by: Taisho Pharmaceutical

Overview
- 116 total selections in 15 (Includes draft for developmental players) rounds
- League: Nippon Professional Baseball
- First round selections: Masahiro Tateishi (Nominated by 3 teams.), Genki Ishigaki, Rintaro Sasaki (Nominated by 2 teams.), Ren Hirakawa (Nominated by 2 teams in re-draft.)

The 2025 Nippon Professional Baseball (NPB) Draft was held on October 23, 2025, for the 61st time at the Grand Prince Hotel Takanawa to assign amateur baseball players to the NPB. It was arranged with the special cooperation of Taisho Pharmaceutical with official naming rights. The draft was officially called "The Professional Baseball Draft Meeting supported by Lipovitan D ". It has been sponsored by Taisho Pharmaceutical for the 13th consecutive year since 2013.

== Format ==
The first round of the draft is conducted via a bid lottery, where every team submits bids for players they'd like to draft. Players who receive multiple nominations result in a drawing of the lots between the nominating teams. The losing teams of the lottery resubmit selections until they get a player without any nominations. Starting from the second round, teams will select in reverse order of the standings, alternating between Central League and Pacific League teams. This year, the Central League will have priority. From the third round the order was reversed continuing in the same fashion until all picks were exhausted. The draft ends when all teams are "selected" or when the total number of selected players reaches 120.

On August 29, 2025, NPB Commissioner Katsuhiko Nakamura announced that players eligible for the upcoming 2026 Major League Baseball draft draft were also eligible for the 2025 NPB draft. Most notably, this includes Rintaro Sasaki, who opted to play college baseball at Stanford instead of entering the NPB draft. Nakamura commented that "we have also confirmed with MLB. He will be eligible for our (draft), and if MLB selects him the following year, it will be possible to negotiate with either side. We have confirmed this. We have answered inquiries from each team. There was a question at the executive committee meeting in July, so we have provided an explanation to all 12 teams."

== First Round ==
	Player name	Position	Teams selected by
First Nomination	Masahiro Tateishi	INF	Carp, Fighters, **Tigers**
First Nomination	Genki Ishigaki	RHP	Buffaloes, **Marines**
First Nomination	Rintaro Sasaki	INF	BayStars, **Hawks**
First Nomination	Sōta Fujiwara	RHP	**Eagles**
First Nomination	Taiga Kojima	C	**Lions**
First Nomination	Ayuto Matsushita	INF	**Swallows**
First Nomination	Masaki Nakanishi	RHP	**Dragons**
First Nomination	Kazuyuki Takemaru	LHP	**Giants**
Second Nomination	Ren Hirakawa	OF	**Carp**, Fighters
Second Nomination	Atsuya Fujikawa	RHP	**Buffaloes**
Second Nomination	Koichiro Oda	INF	**BayStars**
Third Nomination	Jay Ohkawa	RHP	**Fighters**

- **Bolded** teams indicate who won the right to negotiate a contract following a lottery.

List of selected players.

== Selected Players ==
Key
*	Player did not sign

- The order of the teams is the order of second round waiver priority.
- **Bolded** After that, a developmental player who contracted as a registered player under control.

=== Chiba Lotte Marines ===
- Selections

Pick	Player name	Position	Team
1	Genki Ishigaki	RHP	Takasaki University of Health and Welfare Takasaki High School
2	Kaito Mouri	LHP	Meiji University
3	Raito Okumura	LHP	Yokohama High School
4	Yūya Sakurai	INF	Shohei High School
5	Hayato Fuji	RHP	Nippon Express Baseball Club
6	Ryōju Okamura	C	Tomishima High School
7	Yamato Tanaka	RHP	Honda Suzuka Baseball Club
Developmental Player Draft
1	Yuto Nakayama	RHP	Mito Keimei High School
2	Kaishu Takahashi	RHP	Tokushima Indigo Socks
3	Ryo Sugiyama	OF	Aichi Gakuin University

=== Chunichi Dragons ===
- Selections

Round	Player name	Position	Team
1	Masaki Nakanishi	RHP	Aoyama Gakuin University
2	Yoshinori Sakurai	RHP	Tohoku Fukushi University
3	Kunitada Shinozaki	RHP	Tokushima Indigo Socks
4	Kiramu Noto	OF	Meishu Gakuen Hitachi High School
5	Mao Shimpo	INF	Tohoku Fukushi University
6	Asahi Hanada	OF	Toyo University
Developmental Player Draft
1	Kenshin Makino	LHP	Niigata Albirex Baseball Club
2	Taiga Ishikawa	INF	Kakegawa Nishi High School
3	Aisuke Mikami	OF	Ehime Mandarin Pirates

=== Fukuoka SoftBank Hawks ===
- Selections

Round	Player name	Position	Team
1	Rintaro Sasaki*	INF	Stanford
2	Ryūta Inagawa	RHP	Kyushu Kyoritsu University
3	Gōta Suzuki	RHP	Osaka University of Commerce
4	Masato Sagara	RHP	Gifu Kyoritsu University
5	Takanori Takahashi	INF	JR East Baseball Club
Developmental Player Draft
1	Kanta Ikeda	C	Sekine Gakuen High School
2	Ayumu Ezaki	INF	Fukui University of Technology Affiliated Fukui High School
3	Ryusei Ohya	RHP	Chukyo University
4	Reo Ohashi	INF	OISCA Hamamatsu International High School
5	Takahiro Suzuki	OF	CLUB REBASE
6	Renta Nagasaki	RHP	Shiga Gakuen High School
7	Emil Serrano Prenza	OF	Happy Science Academy High School
8	Hokuto Ohyama	RHP	Chuo University Semi-Hardball Baseball Club

=== Hanshin Tigers ===
- Selections

Round	Player name	Position	Team
1	Masahiro Tateishi	INF	Soka University
2	Shogo Tanihata	INF	Nihon University
3	Kaisei Okashiro	OF	University of Tsukuba
4	Saku Hayase	RHP	Kamimura Gakuen High School
5	Shuto Noto	RHP	Niigata Albirex Baseball Club
Developmental Player Draft
1	Ryōsuke Jingu	RHP	Tokyo University of Agriculture, Hokkaido-Okhotsk
2	Shōei Yamasaki	OF	Hyogo Bravers

=== Hiroshima Toyo Carp ===
- Selections

Round	Player name	Position	Team
1	Ren Hirakawa	OF	Sendai University
2	Taichi Saito	RHP	Asia University
3	Naru Katsuda	INF	Kindai University
4	Taiki Kudoh	RHP	Hokkai Gakuen University
5	Seiya Akagi	RHP	Bukkyo University
6	Atsumi Nishikawa	INF	Kamimura Gakuen Iga High School
7	Hayato Takagi	RHP	Chukyo University
Developmental Player Draft
1	Yuta Kobayashi	C	Josai University
2	Daiki Kishimoto	INF	Tokushima Indigo Socks

=== Hokkaido Nippon-Ham Fighters ===
- Selections

Round	Player name	Position	Team
1	Jay Ohkawa	RHP	Meiji University
2	Kane Edokpolo	OF	Osaka Gakuin University
3	Ruan Ohtsuka	INF	Tokai University
4	Minato Handa	INF	Nihon University Fujisawa High School
5	Kaito Fujimori	C	Meitoku Gijuku High School
Developmental Player Draft
1	Hiroki Tsuneya	INF	Hokkai Gakuen University
2	Towa Yokoyama	LHP	Aomori Chuo Gakuin University

=== Orix Buffaloes ===
- Selections

Round	Player name	Position	Team
1	Atsuya Fujikawa	RHP	Nobeoka Gauken High School
2	Haruki Mori	RHP	Osaka Tōin High School
3	Ryūga Satoh	LHP	Takasaki University of Health and Welfare Takasaki High School
4	Yosuke Kubota	OF	Sapporo Nihon University High School
5	Shū Takaya	RHP	Hokkai Gakuen University
6	Kenny Ishikawa*	LHP/OF	Georgia
7	Shikira Nogami	C	Meishu Gakuen Hitachi High School
Developmental Player Draft
1	Haruto Mikata	OF	Tochigi Golden Braves
2	Matthew Ichiro Shapiro	RHP	Toyama GRN Thunderbirds
3	Souta Nakanishi	INF	Nissei High School
4	Issei Watanabe	LHP	Sendai University

=== Saitama Seibu Lions ===
- Selections

Round	Player name	Position	Team
1	Taiga Kojima	C	Meiji University
2	Hakua Iwaki	LHP	Chuo University
3	Shun Akiyama	OF	Chukyo University
4	Keita Horikoshi	RHP	Tohoku Fukushi University
5	Sōwa Yokota	INF	Yamamura Gauken High School
6	Yūshin Kawada	OF	Shikoku Bank Baseball Club
Developmental Player Draft
1	Yuito Arai	INF	Hachioji Academy
2	Takumu Imaoka	INF	Kamimura Gakuen High School
3	Keishin Sato	RHP	Tokushima Indigo Socks
4	Sohta Hamaoka	LHP	Kawawa High School
5	Hiroto Hiraguchi	LHP	Japan University of Economics
6	Yuma Masaki	RHP	Sophia University
7	Ginto Ando	OF	Tokushima Indigo Socks

=== Tohoku Rakuten Golden Eagles ===
- Selections

Round	Player name	Position	Team
1	Sōta Fujiwara	RHP	Hanazono University
2	Tasuke Itoh	RHP	Waseda University
3	Akira Shigenaga	INF	Chuo University
4	Toshiya Ohsakae	C	Ishikawa High School (School Corporation)
5	Taisei Itoh	LHP	Reimei High School
6	Ryu Kitani	RHP	Oji Baseball Club
7	Shoya Sakaue	OF	Kindai University
Developmental Player Draft
1	Daita Horomura	OF	Toyama GRN Thunderbirds
2	Shion Ohtsubo	OF	Ishikawa Million Stars
3	Takuma Nakazawa	RHP	Hakuoh University
4	Kyōsuke Kaneko	INF	Kanagawa University
5	Taiga Shimahara	C	Ehime Mandarin Pirates

=== Tokyo Yakult Swallows ===
- Selections

Round	Player name	Position	Team
1	Ayuto Matsushita	INF	Hosei University
2	Reo Matsukawa	INF	Josai University
3	Taiyo Yamazaki	RHP	Soka University
4	Shohta Masui	LHP	Toyota Motor Corporation Baseball Club
5	Rengo Suzuki	LHP	Tokai University Kofu High School
6	Takumi Ishii	INF	NTT East Japan Baseball Club
7	Ryuto Iida	RHP	ENEOS Baseball Club
Developmental Player Draft
1	Yume Komiya	LHP	Kawasaki City High School for Science and Technology

=== Yokohama DeNA BayStars ===
- Selections

Round	Player name	Position	Team
1	Koichiro Oda	INF	Aoyama Gakuin University
2	Shunya Shimada	RHP	Toyo University
3	Asahi Miyashita	INF	Toyo University
4	Hirmoi Katayama	LHP	Honda Baseball Club
5	Shuto Naruse	INF	NTT West Japan Baseball Club
Developmental Player Draft
1	Uta Shimizu	INF	Kyoto International High School

=== Yomiuri Giants ===
- Selections

Round	Player name	Position	Team
1	Kazuyuki Takemaru	LHP	Saginomiya Seisakusho Baseball Club
2	Ren Tawa	RHP	Waseda University
3	Kyohei Yamashiro	LHP	Asia University
4	Gakuto Minagawa	OF	Chuo University
5	Yuto Kohama	INF	Okinawa Electric Power Company Baseball Club
6	Kento Fuji	INF	Urawa Gakuin High School
Developmental Player Draft
1	Eijiro Tomishige	LHP	Kanagawa Future Dreams
2	Kira Hayashi	RHP	Rissho University
3	Rentaro Matsui	C	Toyohashi Chuo High School
4	Yusaku Kohno	LHP	Aichi Gakuin University
5	Taisei Chinen	OF	Niigata Albirex Baseball Club

Preceded by **2024**	**Nippon Professional Baseball draft**	Succeeded by **2026**
