= 2026 Nippon Professional Baseball draft =

Japanese baseball draft event

2026 Nippon Professional Baseball Draft

General information
- Sport: Baseball
- Date: October 22, 2026
- Location: Grand Prince Hotel Takanawa, Tokyo
- Networks: TBS (first round), sky-A
- Sponsored by: Taisho Pharmaceutical

Overview
- 127 total selections in 24 (Includes draft for developmental players) rounds
- League: Nippon Professional Baseball
- First round selections: Taisei Suzuki, Kai Watabe (Nominated by 2 teams.), Ren Miyahara (Nominated by 2 teams in re-draft.)

The 2026 Nippon Professional Baseball (NPB) Draft was held on October 23, 2026, for the 62nd time at the Grand Prince Hotel Takanawa to assign amateur baseball players to the NPB. It was arranged with the special cooperation of Taisho Pharmaceutical with official naming rights. The draft was officially called "The Professional Baseball Draft Meeting supported by Lipovitan D ". It has been sponsored by Taisho Pharmaceutical for the 14th consecutive year since 2013.

== Format ==
The first round of the draft is conducted via a bid lottery, where every team submits bids for players they'd like to draft. Players who receive multiple nominations result in a drawing of the lots between the nominating teams. The losing teams of the lottery resubmit selections until they get a player without any nominations. Starting from the second round, teams will select in reverse order of the standings, alternating between Central League and Pacific League teams. This year, the Central League will have priority. From the third round the order was reversed continuing in the same fashion until all picks were exhausted. The draft ends when all teams are "selected" or when the total number of selected players reaches 120.

Due to the dissolution of the Panasonic Baseball Club and the Sega Sammy Baseball Club, all players belonging to either squad were made draft-eligible.

Following the draft, a special post-draft show was held, hosted by Emiri Nakagawa and Shinya Miyamoto.

== First Round ==
	Player name	Position	Teams selected by
First Nomination	Taisei Suzuki	RHP	Hawks, Marines
First Nomination	Kai Watabe	C	Dragons, Eagles
First Nomination	Ryosuke Fujisawa	OF	Swallows
First Nomination	Sena Hoshino	LHP	BayStars
First Nomination	Futo Kakuta	RHP	Buffaloes
First Nomination	Keito Kawajiri	RHP	Lions
First Nomination	Haruki Komoda	TWP	Fighters
First Nomination	Shoki Oda	RHP	Giants
First Nomination	Nanato Sakakibara	OF	Tigers
First Nomination	Tanaka Yamasato	INF	Carp
Second Nomination	Ren Miyahara	RHP	Dragons, Marines
Third Nomination	Yuto Yonezawa	LHP	Marines

List of selected players.

== Selected Players ==
Key
*	Player did not sign

- The order of the teams is the order of second round waiver priority.
- **Bolded** After that, a developmental player who contracted as a registered player under control.

=== Chiba Lotte Marines ===
- Selections

Pick	Player name	Position	Team
1	Yuto Yonezawa	LHP	Kansai University
2	Yuta Maeda	LHP	Takaoka Daiichi High School
3	Shunta Nagaya	RHP	ENEOS Baseball Club
4	Yoshinobu Kuroda	OF	Higashi Nippon International University
5	Fuga Shinjo	OF	Nara University High School
6	Kosei Tanaka	OF	Nichinan Gakuen High School
Developmental Player Draft
1	Hisoka Wakato	INF	Takagawa Gakuen High School
2	Toma Sasaki	RHP	Hamanaki Higashi High School
3	Shion Uchida	INF	Sekine Gakuen High School

=== Chunichi Dragons ===
- Selections

Round	Player name	Position	Team
1	Ren Miyahara	RHP	Kindai University
2	Masato Shishibaki	OF	Oji Baseball Club
3	Ran Maejima	C	Asia University
4	Yugo Suzuki	RHP	Chukyo High School
5	Kairi Nishida	LHP	Kyoto International High School
6	Tomohiro Shimizu	C	Yamaha Baseball Club
Developmental Player Draft
1	Ryo Naito	RHP	Ueda Nishi High School
2	Keito Nakanishi	OF	Osaka Toin High School

=== Fukuoka SoftBank Hawks ===
- Selections

Round	Player name	Position	Team
1	Taisei Suzuki	RHP	Aoyama Gakuin University
2	Gaku Arima	LHP	Ritsumeikan University
3	Kazuhiro Watanabe	LHP	Keio University
4	Kojun Fujimori	OF	Hosei University
5	Shunta Inomata	RHP	Tohoku Fukushi University
6	Aota Kotsubo	LHP	Yanagawa High School
7	Taiga Nakagawa	INF	Shigakkan University
8	Iki Funami	RHP	National Taiwan University of Sport
9	Genei Sato	RHP	Penn State
Developmental Player Draft
1	Ryosuke Niwa	RHP	Wakayama City Wakayama High School
2	Hyuga Kanda	LHP	Tsuruga High School
3	Koki Sugimoto	RHP	KT Wiz
4	Shoki Tamoto	RHP	Komazawa University
5	Yujiro Kameda	LHP	Yamamura Gakuen High School
6	Eiji Konoshita	RHP	Takagawa Gakuen High School
7	Taiga Tsujimura	OF	Tohoku Fukushi University
8	Yuta Murayama	RHP	Kansai University of International Studies
9	Musashi Nagayama	INF	Japan Wellness High School (Okinawa)
10	Fudai Nerei	INF	Fresno City College
11	Toranosuke Kamiya	OF	Chiba Sky Sailors
12	Akira Tsurukawauchi	RHP	Osaka University of Commerce
13	Yukinori Matsubayashi	RHP	Osaka University of Commerce
14	Shugo Murakumo	C	Tsuruga High School
15	Mamoru Hirayama	C	Fukuoka Prefectural Tochiku High School

=== Hanshin Tigers ===
- Selections

Round	Player name	Position	Team
1	Nanato Sakakibara	OF	Meiji University
2	Takumi Baba	RHP	Nippon Sport Science University
3	Shota Tsnemi	LHP	Osaka University of Economics
4	Kanata Aiba	INF	Yamaha Baseball Club
5	Riku Matoba	RHP	Tenri University
6	Kaito Koshikawa	C	Tokyo Gas Baseball Club
7	Koki Ishii	RHP	Tokushima Indigo Socks
Developmental Player Draft
1	Kenshin Yamashita	RHP	Tokushima Indigo Socks
2	Seiya Araki	RHP	Tokushima Indigo Socks

=== Hiroshima Toyo Carp ===
- Selections

Round	Player name	Position	Team
1	Tanaka Yamasato	INF	Asia University
2	Keiya Nishino	C	Ritsumeikan University
3	Genki Nohara	RHP	Kyoto Sangyo University
4	Ryohei Yoshikawa	RHP	Chiba University of Commerce
5	Hotaka Mitsuhiro	INF	Meiji University
6	Kodai Mori	RHP	NTT East Japan Baseball Club
Developmental Player Draft
1	Jin Kurumatani	INF	Ibaraki Astro Planets
2	Asahi Tashiro	C	University of Tsukuba
3	Kaito Minayoshi	INF	Nagasaki International University

=== Hokkaido Nippon-Ham Fighters ===
- Selections

Round	Player name	Position	Team
1	Haruki Komoda	TWP	Yamanashi Gakuin High School
2	Sho Mure	OF	Kyushu International University High School
3	Ryosuke Sueyoshi	LHP	Okinawa Shogaku High School
4	Sora Kato	RHP	Meisei University
5	Shoto Okamoto	RHP	Korigaoka High School
Developmental Player Draft
1	Kohei Okada	OF	Osaka Institute of Technology
2	Yuki Fuji	RHP	Fukuoka Prefectural Shingu High School
3	Sota Hangui	INF	Tokyo University of Agriculture Second High School
4	Shinya Ojima	INF	Tohoku Fukushi University
5	Keisuke Imazu	INF	Keio University

=== Orix Buffaloes ===
- Selections

Round	Player name	Position	Team
1	Futo Kakuta	RHP	Fuji University
2	Shin Nakai	RHP	Komazawa University
3	Akito Haruyama	OF	Osaka University of Commerce
4	Ruito Kondo	RHP	Otaru Funba High School
5	Ryosuke Nomura	RHP	Bukkyo University
6	Yuga Chiba	RHP	Honda Baseball Club
Developmental Player Draft
1	Ryota Kurokawa	RHP	Hanasaki Tokuharu High School
2	Ryuto Ijiri	C	Sendai University
3	Kengo Yoshida	C	Tochigi Golden Braves
4	George Howell Evan Kawata	INF	Jobu University
5	Kashu Wakato	INF	Doho University
6	Daisuke Suguwara	OF	Sendo Ichiba

=== Saitama Seibu Lions ===
- Selections

Round	Player name	Position	Team
1	Keito Kawajiri	RHP	Asia University
2	Seiya Kakimoto	RHP	Panasonic Baseball Club
3	Yusuke Sawayama	LHP	Yamaha Baseball Club
4	Ryo Tanaka	C	Third Junior & Senior High School of Nihon University
5	Yamato Nakatsu	OF	Nippon Life Baseball Club
Developmental Player Draft
1	Ryodai Miura	RHP	Ibaraki Astro Planets
2	Kenshin Kawashima	RHP	Ryukoku University Heian High School
3	Koki Goto	C	Numazu Commercial High School

=== Tohoku Rakuten Golden Eagles ===
- Selections

Round	Player name	Position	Team
1	Kai Watabe	C	Aoyama Gakuin University
2	Keigo Okada	INF	Meiji University
3	Shin Higuchi	LHP	Oji Baseball Club
4	Yoshiaki Hagihara	C	Toshiba Baseball Club
5	Yoshihiro Taka	INF	Niigata Albirex Baseball Club
6	Miyato Watanabe	LHP	Kochi Fighting Dogs
Developmental Player Draft
1	Goki Nemoto	OF	Toyama GRN Thunderbirds
2	Yu Fujihara	OF	Tokushima Indigo Socks
3	Han-geun Kim	LHP	Ibaraki Astro Planets
4	Kodai Terai	INF	Tokushima Indigo Socks

=== Tokyo Yakult Swallows ===
- Selections

Round	Player name	Position	Team
1	Ryosuke Fujisawa	OF	Tokyo Gas Baseball Club
2	Yuto Sato	OF	Tohoku Fukushi University
3	Seiya Fukuhara	C	Meiji University
4	Eidai Takada	INF	Miyakonjo High School
5	Shinya Kawahira	RHP	Ibaraki Astro Planets
6	Yamato Ishizawa	LHP	Nippon Steel Muroran Sharks
7	Shunsuke Watanabe	INF	Tokushima Indigo Socks
Developmental Player Draft
1	Hyuga Nishino	INF	Ehime Mandarin Pirates
2	Masahiro Takahashi	RHP	Soka High School
3	Kanta Ozaki	LHP	Sega Sammy Baseball Club

=== Yokohama DeNA BayStars ===
- Selections

Round	Player name	Position	Team
1	Sena Hoshino	LHP	Osaka University of Commerce
2	Masanori Honishi	TWP	Japan Aviation High School Ishikawa
3	Kansai Sugimoto	TWP	UBC
4	Ryosei Koganei	RHP	Aomori University
5	Eito Kiguchi	RHP	Jobu University
6	Riku Kamizato	C	ENEOS Baseball Club
7	Wataru Sakaguchi	OF	Honda Baseball Club

Note: The BayStars made no Developmental Player Draft selections

=== Yomiuri Giants ===
- Selections

Round	Player name	Position	Team
1	Shoki Oda	RHP	Yokohama High School
2	Reito Hirata	RHP	Oita Commercial High School
3	Shoma Ikeda	INF	Yokohama High School
4	Mahiro Sugimoto	LHP	Chiben Gakuen High School
5	Kaito Ito	INF	Chuo University
6	Kaisei Matsudaira	RHP	Kanagawa University
Developmental Player Draft
1	Eito Tanibuchi	C	Osaka Tōin High School
2	Kyuta Yanai	INF	Ube Technical High School
3	Takehito Shima	OF	Honkuetsu High School
4	Rikuto Matsuda	OF	Matsugen Mioshima Baseball Club
5	Rentaro Seki	C	Kawasaki Municipal Junior High School

Preceded by 2025	Nippon Professional Baseball draft	Succeeded by 2027
