= Koya Fujii =

Japanese baseball player (born 1996)

Kouya Fujii
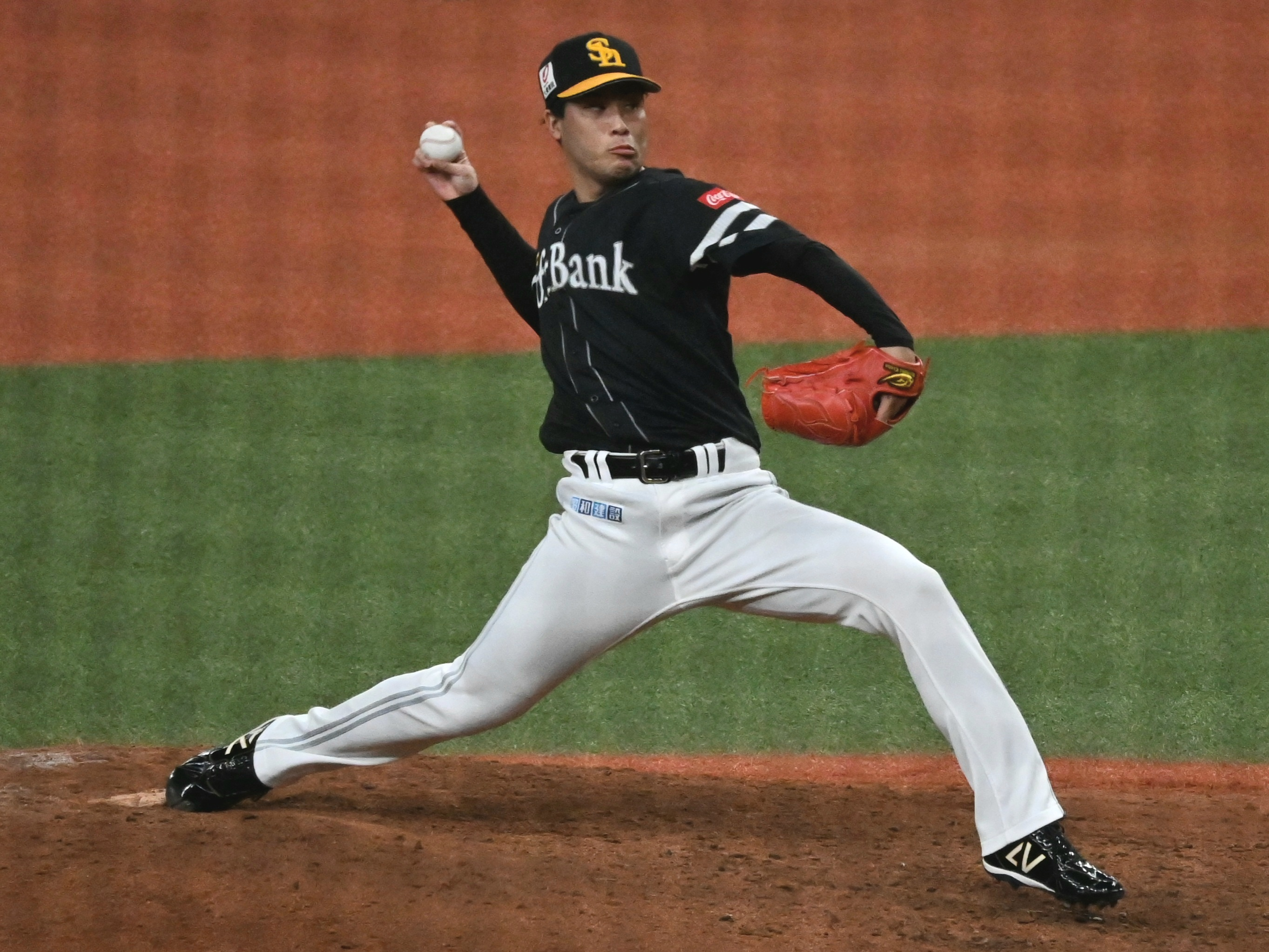
- Fujii with the Fukuoka SoftBank Hawks.

Fukuoka SoftBank Hawks – No. 48
- Pitcher
- Born: July 29, 1996 (age 29); Kasaoka, Okayama, Japan
- Bats: Left Throws: Right

NPB debut
- September 30, 2017, for the Hiroshima Toyo Carp

Career statistics (through 2024 season)
- Win–loss record: 13–5
- Earned run average: 2.53
- Strikeouts: 240
- Stats at Baseball Reference

Teams
- Hiroshima Toyo Carp (2015–2020); Fukuoka SoftBank Hawks (2022–present)

Career highlights and awards
- Japan Series champion (2025)

Kōya Fujii (藤井 皓哉, Fujii Kōya; born July 29, 1996) is a Japanese professional baseball pitcher for the Fukuoka SoftBank Hawks of Nippon Professional Baseball (NPB). He has previously played in NPB for the Hiroshima Toyo Carp.

== Professional career ==
=== Hiroshima Toyo Carp ===
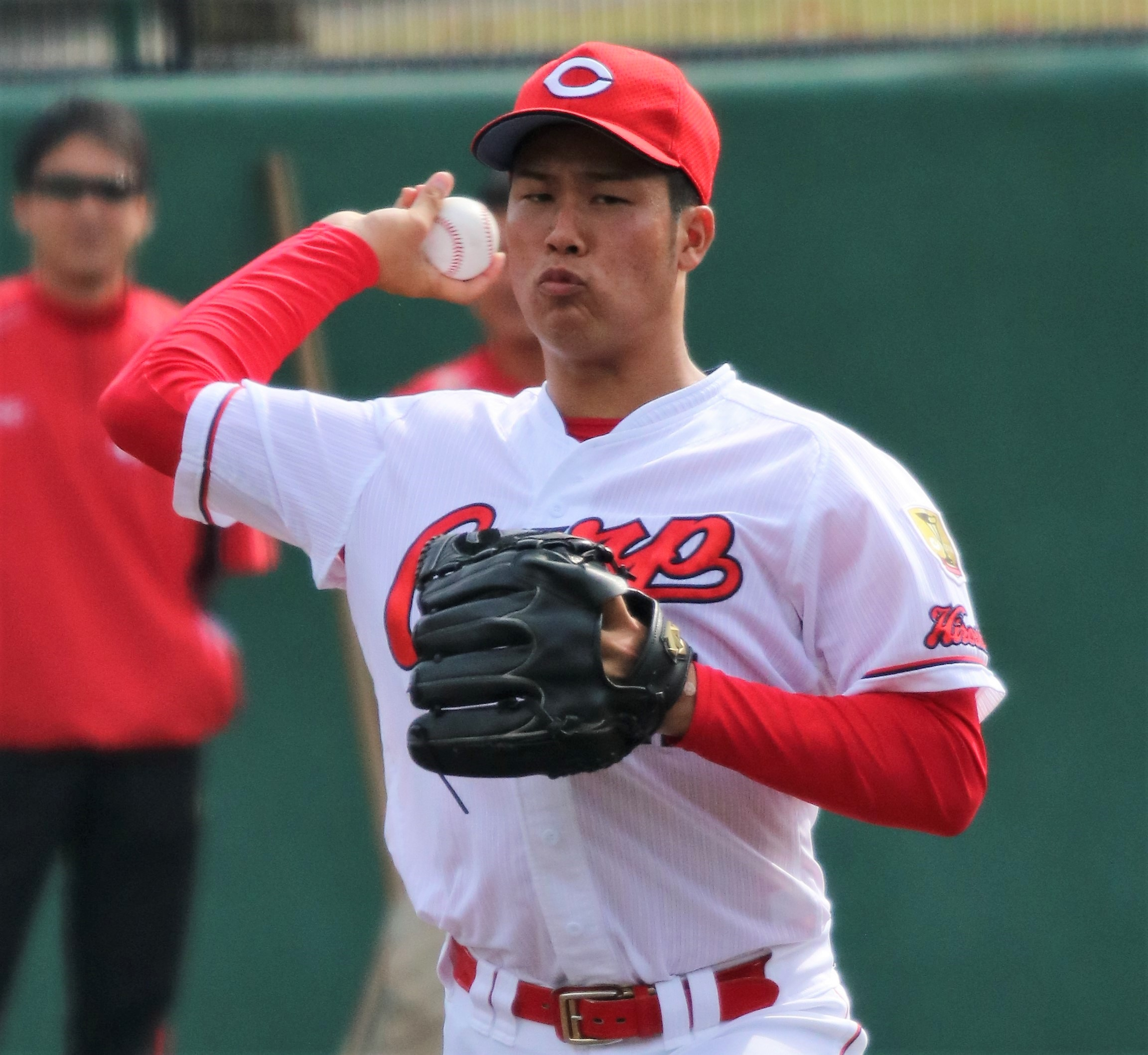
Fujii with Hiroshima Toyo Carp.

On October 23, 2014, Fujii was drafted by the Hiroshima Toyo Carp in the 2014 Nippon Professional Baseball draft.

==== 2015–2020 season ====
In 2015–2016 season, Fujii played in the Western League of NPB's second league.

On September 30, 2017, Fujii debuted in the Central League against the Yokohama DeNA BayStars as a relief pitcher, and recorded holds. In 2017 season, he pitched in two games in the Central League.

On June 6, 2018, he pitched against the Hokkaido Nippon-Ham Fighters in an Interleague play (NPB) and recorded his first win. In 2018 season, he finished the regular season with 8 games pitched, a 1–0 win–loss record, a 6.14 ERA, and a 21 strikeouts in 14.2 innings. In 2018 season, he finished the regular season with 8 games pitched, a 1–0 win–loss record, a 6.14 ERA, and a 21 strikeouts in 14 2/3 innings.

In 2019 season, he pitched in 4 games in the Central League.

In 2020 season, he never got a chance to pitch in the first league. On November 4, 2020, the Carp announced he would be released.

=== Kochi Fighting Dogs ===
On December 29, 2020, Fujii signed with the Kochi Fighting Dogs of the independent league Shikoku Island League Plus.

On May 9, 2021, he achieved a no-hitter in an interleague match against the Fukuoka SoftBank Hawks 3rd squad. This later became the notch for the Hawks to acquire Fujii.

In 2021 season, he finished the regular season with 22 games pitched, a 11–3 win–loss record, a 1.12 ERA, and a 180 strikeouts in 145 innings.

=== Fukuoka SoftBank Hawks ===
On December 14, 2021, Fujii signed with the Fukuoka SoftBank Hawks a 5.5 million yen contract as a developmental player.

On March 22, 2022, he re-signed a 6.5 million yen contract as a registered player under control. He pitched as a relief pitcher in the match against the Hokkaido Nippon-Ham Fighters on March 27, and won the NPB for the first time in four years. On June 1, he recorded his first save against the Yomiuri Giants in an Interleague play (NPB). Since then, he has contributed to the team as a setup man, finished the regular season with 55 Games pitched, a 5–1 win–loss record, a 1.12 ERA, 22 holds, 3 saves, and 81 strikeouts in 56 1/3 innings.

From the 2023 season, Fujii became a starting pitcher, and became the winning pitcher for the first time as a starting pitcher against the Chiba Lotte Marines on April 1. He was then part of the starting pitching rotation, but on June 11, he was diagnosed with a left internal oblique muscle strain and headed for rehabilitation. But he returned on July 25. After that, he contributed to the team as a setup man. Fujii finished the regular season with 34 Games pitched, a 5-3 win–loss record, a 2.33 ERA, 9 holds, and 84 strikeouts in 69 2/3 innings.
