= Ryota Nakamura (baseball) =

Japanese baseball player (born 1998)

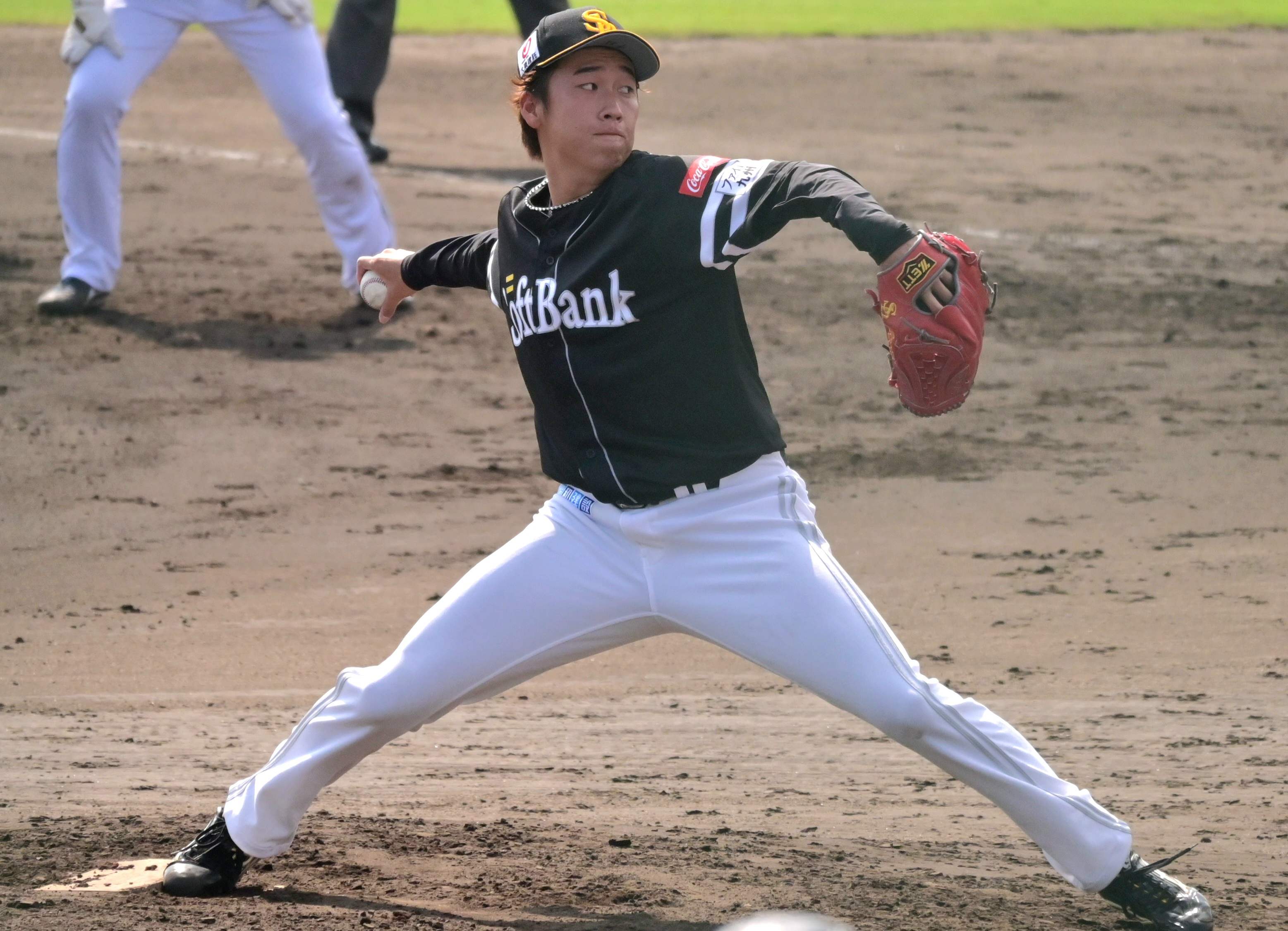

Chiba Lotte Marines – No. 124
- Pitcher
- Born: May 18, 1998 (age 27); Yotsukaidō, Chiba, Japan
- Bats: Right Throws: Right

NPB debut
- July 7, 2022, for the Fukuoka SoftBank Hawks

NPB statistics (through 2022 season)
- Win–loss record: 0-0
- ERA: 33.75
- Strikeouts: 1
- Stats at Baseball Reference

Teams
- Fukuoka SoftBank Hawks (2021–2021)

Ryota Nakamura (中村 亮太, Nakamura Ryota; born May 18, 1998) is a Japanese professional baseball Pitcher for the Chiba Lotte Marines of Nippon Professional Baseball.

== Professional career ==
On October 26, 2020, Nakamura was drafted as a developmental player by the Fukuoka Softbank Hawks in the 2020 Nippon Professional Baseball draft.

In 2021 season, he played in the Western League of NPB's minor leagues and informal matches against Shikoku Island League Plus's teams and amateur baseball teams.

On July 2, 2022, Nakamura signed a 6.5 million yen contract as a registered player under control. On July 7, he pitched his debut game against the Tohoku Rakuten Golden Eagles as a relief pitcher.

On November 10, 2022, the Hawks re-signed Nakamura as a developmental player at an estimated salary of 6.5 million yen, which is the same as his current salary. On November 27, he changed his uniform number from 60 to 137 beginning with the 2023 season, it was announced. July 24, he will change his uniform number from 137 to 20, it was announced.
