= Kenta Kurose =

Japanese baseball player (born 1997)

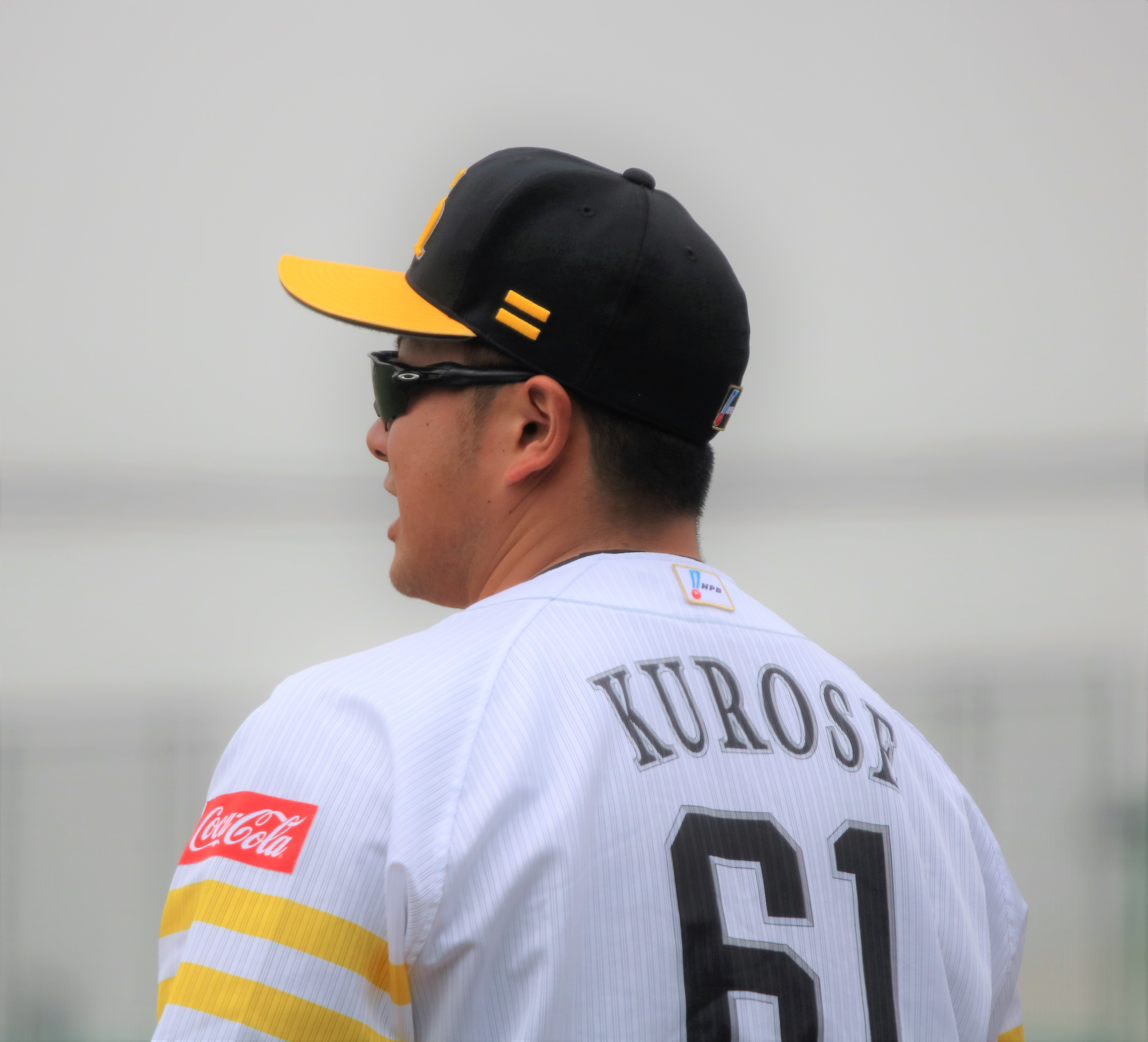
- Kurose with the Fukuoka SoftBank Hawks
- Infielder
- Born: August 12, 1997 (age 28); Sennan, Osaka, Japan
- Bats: Right Throws: Right

NPB debut
- July 30, 2022, for the Fukuoka SoftBank Hawks

NPB statistics (through 2022 season)
- Batting average: .167
- Home runs: 0
- RBI: 1
- Hits: 2

Teams
- Fukuoka SoftBank Hawks (2016–2022)

Kenta Kurose (黒瀬 健太, Kurose Kenta; born August 12, 1997) is a Japanese former professional baseball Infielder of Nippon Professional Baseball(NPB). He previously played in NPB for the Fukuoka SoftBank Hawks.

== Professional career ==
=== Active player era ===
On October 22, 2015, Kurose was drafted by the Fukuoka Softbank Hawks in the 2015 Nippon Professional Baseball draft. During the 2016–2018 season, Kurose played in the Western League of NPB's second leagues, but did not get a chance to be promoted to the Pacific League, and signed a contract as a developmental player from the 2019 season. In the 2019–2021 season, he played in informal matches against the Shikoku Island League Plus's teams and amateur baseball teams, and played in the Western League of NPB's minor leagues.

On July 28, 2022, Kurose signed a 6.5 million yen contract as a registered player under control for the first time in four seasons. On July 30, he debuted in the Pacific League against the Saitama Seibu Lions, and recorded his first RBI on July 31. October 22, 2022, the Hawks announced he was a free agent.

=== After retirement ===
Kurose has been a team staff member for the Fukuoka SoftBank Hawks since the 2023 season.
