= Daiju Nomura =

Japanese baseball player (born 2000)

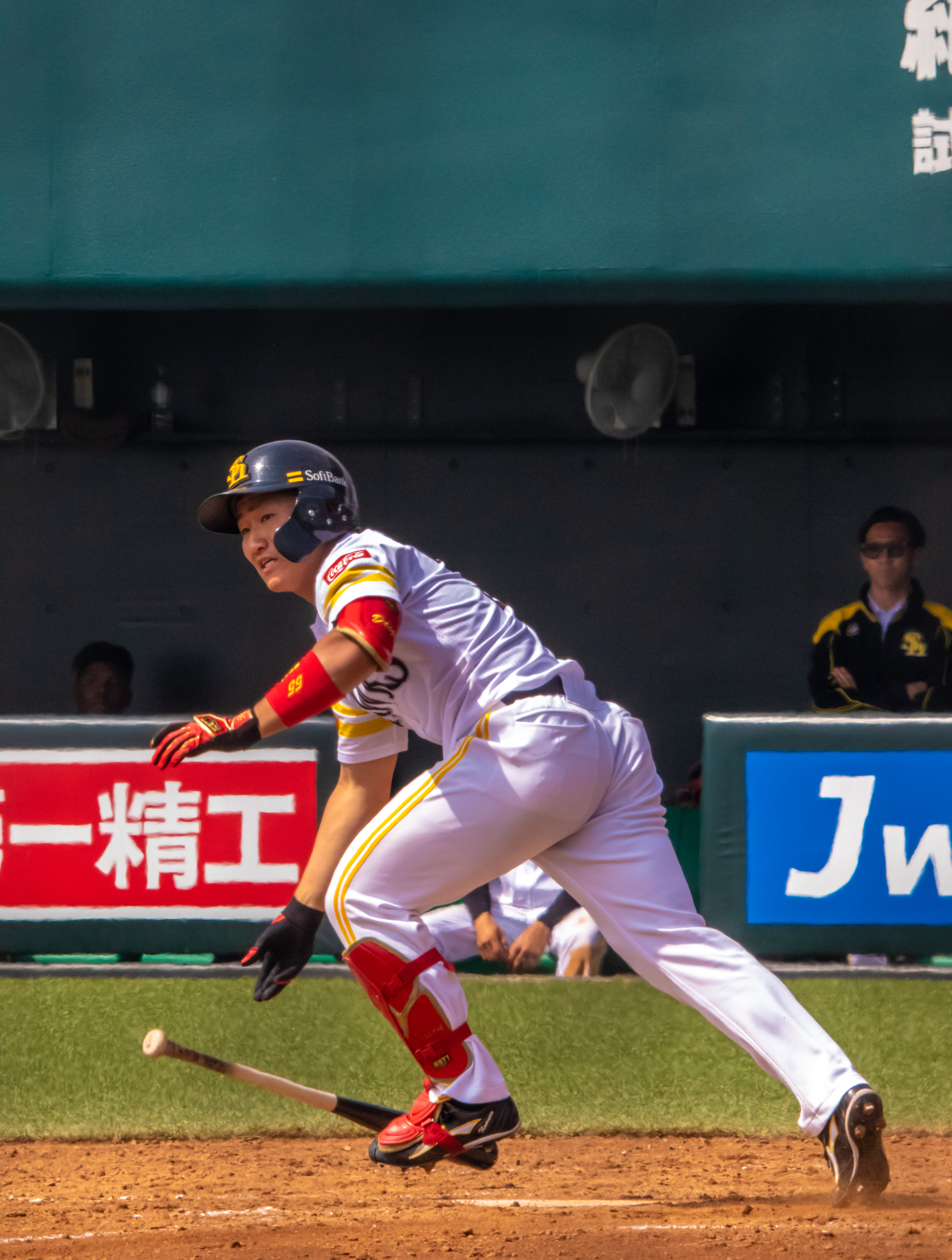
- Nomura with the Fukuoka SoftBank Hawks.

Saitama Seibu Lions – No. 120
- Infielder, Catcher
- Born: September 10, 2000 (age 25); Takarazuka, Hyōgo, Japan
- Bats: Right Throws: Right

NPB debut
- September 28, 2019, for the Fukuoka SoftBank Hawks

NPB statistics (through July 8, 2024)
- Batting average: .214
- Home runs: 1
- RBI: 16

Teams
- Fukuoka SoftBank Hawks (2019–2024); Saitama Seibu Lions (2024–present)

Daiju Nomura (野村 大樹, Nomura Daiju; born September 10, 2000) is a Japanese professional baseball infielder and catcher for the Saitama Seibu Lions of Nippon Professional Baseball (NPB). He has previously played in NPB for the Fukuoka SoftBank Hawks.

== Early baseball career ==
Nomura participated in the 2nd grade spring the 89th Japanese High School Baseball Invitational Tournament, as a Third baseman of the Waseda Jitsugyo High School with Kōtarō Kiyomiya. And he recorded a total of 68 home runs in his three years in high school.

== Professional career ==
=== Fukuoka SoftBank Hawks ===
On October 25, 2018, Nomura was drafted by the Fukuoka SoftBank Hawks in the 2018 Nippon Professional Baseball draft.

On September 28, 2019, Nomura debuted in the Pacific League against the Orix Buffaloes, and recorded his first career hit. Overall in 2019, Nomura played in two total games for Fukuoka. In the 2020 season, Nomura was unable to play in the Pacific League and played 74 games in the Western League with a batting average of .263 and three home runs. In 2021, Nomura appeared seven games for the Hawks, going 3–for–17 (.177) with three RBI.

In the 2022 season, Nomura was registered first team on June 27, 2022, and recorded a hit that day against the Chiba Lotte Marines. On July 13, against the Orix Buffaloes, he recorded the game-winning RBI. On August 24, he was active against the Tohoku Rakuten Golden Eagles with three hits, a multi-hit game. While the team's main players were taken off the first team registration due to a positive test for COVID-19, Nomura, Kenta Tanigawara, and Shu Masuda, known as the Chikugo Hawks (a nickname given to the younger reserve players. Chikugo is the name of the place where the Hawks farm team is located.), supported the team's difficult situation with 20 hits and 16 runs in four games. He finished the regular season with a .229/.270/.329 slash line, 16 hits, and eight RBI across 31 games.

On August 22, 2023, Nomura hit his first career home run against the Chiba Lotte Marines. He also stole a base for the first time in a game against Tohoku Rakuten Golden Eagles on September 20. In the 2023 campaign, Nomura played 41 games, and finished the season with a .216/.253/.284 batting line, one home run, and four RBI.

Nomura made only two appearances for Fukuoka in 2024, going hitless in both of his at–bats.

=== Saitama Seibu Lions ===
On July 5, 2024, Nomura was traded to the Saitama Seibu Lions in exchange for Hiromasa Saito.
