= Kenta Tanigawara =

Japanese baseball player (born 1997)

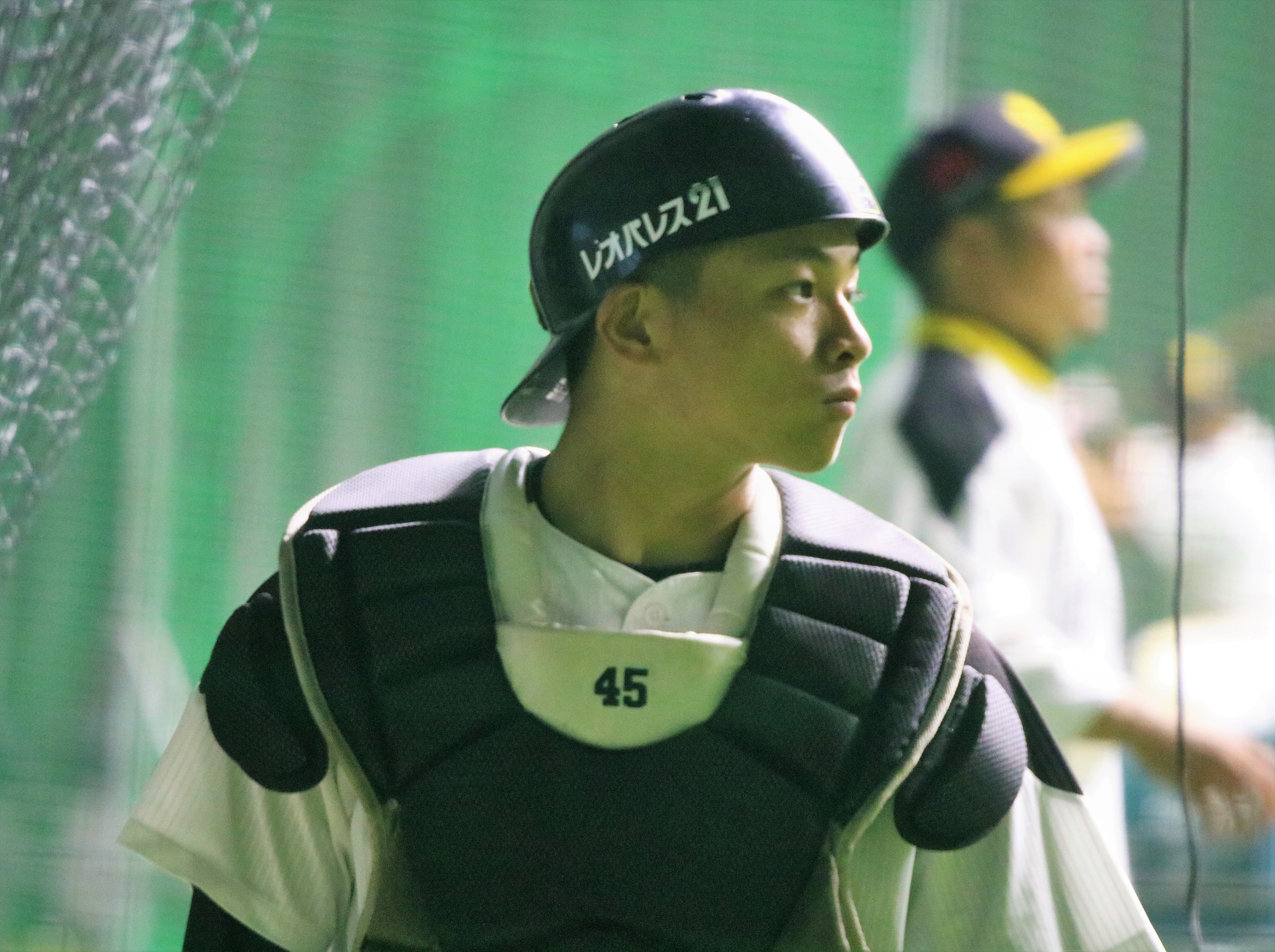
- Tanigawara with the Fukuoka SoftBank Hawks.

Fukuoka SoftBank Hawks – No. 45
- Catcher
- Born: April 16, 1997 (age 28); Toyohashi, Aichi, Japan
- Bats: Left Throws: Right

NPB debut
- June 19, 2021, for the Fukuoka SoftBank Hawks

NPB statistics (through 2025 season)
- Batting average: .233
- Home runs: 4
- Run batted in: 22

Teams
- Fukuoka SoftBank Hawks (2016–present)

Career highlights and awards
- 2× Japan Series champion (2020, 2025)

Kenta Tanigawara (谷川原 健太, Tanigawara Kenta; born April 16, 1997) is a Japanese professional baseball catcher for the Fukuoka SoftBank Hawks of Nippon Professional Baseball (NPB).

== Professional career ==
On October 22, 2015, Tanigawara was drafted by the Fukuoka Softbank Hawks in the 2015 Nippon Professional Baseball draft.

In 2016–2020 season, he played in the Western League of NPB's minor leagues and played in informal matches against Shikoku Island League Plus's teams.

In the 2020 Japan Series against the Yomiuri Giants, he was selected as the Japan Series roster.

On June 19, 2021, Tanigawara debuted in the Pacific League against the Hokkaido Nippon-Ham Fighters, and recorded his first Home run. In 2021 season, he played 59 games and was used primarily as a substitute and defensive lineman.

In 2022 season, Tanigawara contributed to the team primarily as an outfield defender and substitute, finishing the season with a .234 batting average and eight runs batted in in 75 games. However, while COVID-19 caused the team's main players to be eliminated from the Player registration one after another, he went 4 hits-for-4 at bats with four RBI against the Tohoku Rakuten Golden Eagles on August 23. He was a member of the "Chikugo Hawks" and supported the team until the main players returned. (a nickname given to the younger reserve players. Chikugo is the name of the place where the Hawks farm team is located.)

Tanigawara mainly contributed to the team as a reserve player in the late stages of games by playing catcher and outfield defense, but he appeared as a starter for the first time in a match against the Chiba Lotte Marines on July 29, 2023. In 2023 season, he played 61 games, and finished the season with a .233 batting average, 3 stolen bases, and a 3 RBIs.
