= Rintaro Sasaki =

Japanese baseball player (born 2005)

Miami Marlins
- First baseman
- Born: April 18, 2005 (age 21); Hanamaki, Iwate, Japan
- Bats: Left Throws: Right
- Stats at Baseball Reference

Rintaro Sasaki (佐々木 麟太郎, Sasaki Rintaro; born April 18, 2005) is a Japanese professional baseball first baseman in the Miami Marlins organization.

== Amateur career ==
Sasaki attended Hanamaki Higashi High School in Iwate Prefecture, and played for the school's baseball team. Sasaki set the Japanese high school record with 140 home runs. He graduated in March 2024.

Sasaki decided to enroll at Stanford University to play college baseball for the Stanford Cardinal rather than enter the Nippon Professional Baseball draft, as he hoped to play in Major League Baseball (MLB). He arrived in time for the spring semester in 2024, but did not join the team for the 2024 season to acclimate to the United States. Sasaki played for the Trenton Thunder of the MLB Draft League in June 2024 and for the Greeneville Flyboys of the Appalachian League in July. He debuted with the Cardinal in 2025. Baseball America rated Sasaki as the best freshman in collegiate baseball before the season. He had a .269 batting average with seven home runs and 41 runs batted in in 52 games played for the Cardinal. After the 2025 collegiate season, Sasaki played collegiate summer baseball for the Cotuit Kettleers of the Cape Cod Baseball League.

== Professional career ==
Sasaki was eligible for the 2025 Nippon Professional Baseball draft and the 2026 Major League Baseball draft. The Fukuoka SoftBank Hawks and the Yokohama DeNA BayStars selected him in the first round of the NPB draft, with the Hawks winning his negotiating rights. The Miami Marlins selected Sasaki in the eighth round, with the 235th overall selection, in the 2026 Major League Baseball draft.

On July 19, Sasaki announced in a press conference in his hometown of Hanamaki that he would sign with the Marlins. He signed the following day, for a $210,200 signing bonus.

== Personal life ==
Sasaki's father, Hiroshi Sasaki, was his coach in high school. Hiroshi also coached Shohei Ohtani and Yusei Kikuchi; Kikuchi considers Rintaro to be like a younger brother.
