= Nippon Professional Baseball Agreement =

Nippon Professional Baseball Agreement (日本プロフェッショナル野球協約, Nippon Professional Yakyū Kyoyaku) is an agreement that the Nippon Professional Baseball Organization stipulates all NPB regulations, such as player contracts, draft and commissioner authority.

== Summary ==
Nippon Professional Baseball Agreement came into effect on June 21, 1951 and is being revised from time to time.

This Agreement consists of this article and the unified contract document format used by all players when making a contract.

All regulations such as draft meetings, player contracts, commissioner authority, etc. are stipulated, and NPB is operated based on this agreement, which is also called the "Constitution of Nippon Professional Baseball".

As the rules attached to this agreement, the rules of the Developmental player system (日本プロ野球育成選手に関する規約) and the rules of the operation of the Nippon Professional Baseball draft (新人選手選択会議規約) and the rules of the free agent system. (フリーエージェント規約) etc. are stipulated.

== Composition ==
- Chapter 1: General rules
- Chapter 2: Commissioner
- Chapter 3: Executive Committee
- Chapter 4: Owners' Meeting
- Chapter 5: Commissioner Secretariat
- Chapter 6: Qualification to participate
- Chapter 7: Region protection rights
- Chapter 8: Player contract
- Chapter 9: Hold players
- Chapter 10: Reinstatement procedure
- Chapter 11: Limitation on the number of players
- Chapter 12: Salary limits
- Chapter 13: Transfer of player contract
- Chapter 14: Draft meeting
- Chapter 15: Adoption of rookie player
- Chapter 16: Umpire and scorer
- Chapter 17: Game
- Chapter 18: Harmful behavior
- Chapter 19: Prohibition of interests
- Chapter 20: Sue
- Chapter 21: Note
- Chapter 22: Free agent
- Chapter 23: Special case of structural reform
- Chapter 24: Japan Series participation team decision match

== See also ==
- Nippon Professional Baseball
- Nippon Professional Baseball rosters
- Registration of players under control
- Developmental player system
