= Rei Tamaki =

Japanese pornographic actor

- 玉木 玲
- Born: 岩楯 祥吾 (Shōgo Iwadate); August 25, 1986 (age 40); Tokyo, Japan
- Education: Asia University (Japan)
- Occupations: Pornographic actor; AV actor
- Years active: 2011–
- Notable work: 1. SNIS-751 - Shinjin NO. 1 Sutairu kasshoku no junshin muku shojo yugetsu aisha 18-sai AV debyu; 2. Sukeru nôbura, porori shi chau Jcup chakui-shin chichi no yûwaku 3. Damena otto no tame ni nûdomoderu ni natta teishuku kyonyû tsuma; 4. Ne~e nê etchi shi chau? Chiramise gen'eki aidoru to H na gakuen-sei katsu senzoku dai 3-dan aidoru ga masakano shikkin made...ww

Rei Tamaki (Japanese: 玉木 玲) is a Japanese pornographic actor. He is known for his strength and incredible self-control, as he can last anywhere from 30 seconds to 50 minutes without ejaculating.

== Career ==
He made his debut in 2011. According to Genjin Moribayashi, he is the most explosive talent among the next generation of male actors. Moribayashi noted his unique ability to remain perfectly still after penetration and ejaculate instantly, often before the director or staff can even react. Moribayashi emphasized that this is not premature ejaculation, but rather a disciplined form of 'controlled ejaculation.'

His latest work was released in April 2022.

== Trivia ==
- He is said to resemble Mirai Moriyama.
- His nickname is "Tama-chan (たまちゃん)."
