= John Stevens (scholar) =

American Buddhist scholar and aikidoka (1947–2025)

- Born: December 2, 1947; Evanston, Illinois, U.S.
- Died: July 21, 2025 (aged 77); Honolulu, Hawaii, U.S.
- Nationality: American
- Style: Aikido
- Teacher: Rinjiro Shirata
- Rank: 7th dan, Aikikai

John William Stevens (December 2, 1947 – July 21, 2025) was an American Buddhist priest, author, professor of Buddhist studies and Aikido teacher.

Stevens lived in Sendai, Japan, from 1973 to around 2008, where he taught Eastern philosophy and Aikido at Tohoku Fukushi University. His Aikido rank was 7th dan Aikikai. After leaving Japan, he moved to Honolulu, Hawaii, where he resided until his death on July 21, 2025.

== Biography ==
Stevens was born in Chicago but grew up in Evanston, Illinois. He moved to Sendai in 1973 in order to study Buddhism and began practicing Aikido soon afterwards. He trained with many teachers throughout his career, but his main teacher was Shirata Rinjiro (9th dan Aikikai), about whom he wrote the book Aikido: The Way of Harmony. He created his own system, which he called Classical Aikido, which is a complete system emphasizing misogi, kotodama, and the unity of aiki-ken, aiki-jo, and taijutsu (body arts). He taught it at numerous seminars all over the world.

== Criticism ==
John Stevens is known to insert his own wording as well as remove original significant wording in his Japanese to English technical translation in aikido publication.

In 1992 edition of The Art of Peace, it's implied that Ueshiba said "True victory is self-victory". However, in note of direct teaching from Ueshiba, there never was intention of causal, equivalent or containing relationship between Masakatsu (正勝) and Agatsu (吾勝). Furthermore, Ueshiba never used term "The Art of Peace" as replacement for aikido; his own names were Aiki, Aikido, Takemusu Aiki, Shobu Aiki, Budo. In the book, however, Stevens' term almost universally replaced any term refer to aikido.

== Bibliography ==
Stevens wrote over thirty books on Buddhism, Aikido and Asian culture, including:

- Training with the Master – Lessons with Morihei Ueshiba ISBN 1-57062-568-9 (2004 Edition)
- Zen Brushwork: Focusing the Mind With Calligraphy and Painting
- Lust for Enlightenment: Buddhism and Sex ISBN 0-87773-416-X
- The Sword of No-Sword: Life of the Master Warrior Tesshu ISBN 1-57062-050-4
- The Secrets of Aikido ISBN 1-57062-235-3 (1997 Edition)
- Abundant Peace ISBN 0-87773-350-3
- Aikido: The Way of Harmony ISBN 0-394-71426-1
- Invincible Warrior ISBN 1-57062-394-5 (1999 Edition)
- Zen Bow, Zen Arrow (2012) ISBN 9780834827233
- Marathon Monks of Mount Hiei (Shambhala 1988, Echo Point Books 2013 paperback, ISBN 978-1626549951)
- The Philosophy of Aikido (2013 paperback edition) ISBN 978-1626549937
- Extraordinary Zen Masters: A Maverick, a Master of Masters, and a Wandering Poet (2013 paperback edition) ISBN 978-1626549920
- Sacred Calligraphy of the East (2013 paperback edition) ISBN 978-1626549944
- The Way of Judo: A Portrait of Jigoro Kano (2013) ISBN 978-1590309162
- Three Budo Masters (1995) ISBN 4-770018-52-5
- The Shambhala Guide to Aikido (1996) ISBN 978-1-57062-170-3
- Budo Secrets (2001) ISBN 1-570624-46-1

=== Translations and collections ===
- The Art of Peace ISBN 1-59030-144-7 (2011 Edition)
- Best Aikido: The Fundamentals (Illustrated Japanese Classics) ISBN 4-7700-2762-1
- The Aikido Master Course: Best Aikido 2 ISBN 4-7700-2763-X
- Budo Secrets ISBN 1-57062-915-3
- Dewdrops on a Lotus Leaf: Zen Poems of Ryokan
- One Robe, One Bowl: The Zen Poetry of Ryokan
- Wild Ways: Zen Poems of Ikkyu (Companions for the Journey)
- Lotus Moon: The Poetry of Rengetsu (Companions for the Journey) ISBN 1-893996-36-0
- Rengetsu: Life and Poetry of Lotus Moon ISBN 1-6265-4931-1
- Mountain Tasting: Zen Haiku by Santoka Taneda ISBN 0-8348-0151-5
- The Heart of Aikido: The Philosophy of Takemusu Aiki by Morihei Ueshiba ISBN 4770031149
- The Essence of Aikido: The Teachings of Morihei Ueshiba (1993) ISBN 4-770017-27-8
