= Nippon Professional Baseball draft =

Conference held by the Nippon Professional Baseball Organization (NPB)

- Current season, competition or edition: 2026 Nippon Professional Baseball draft
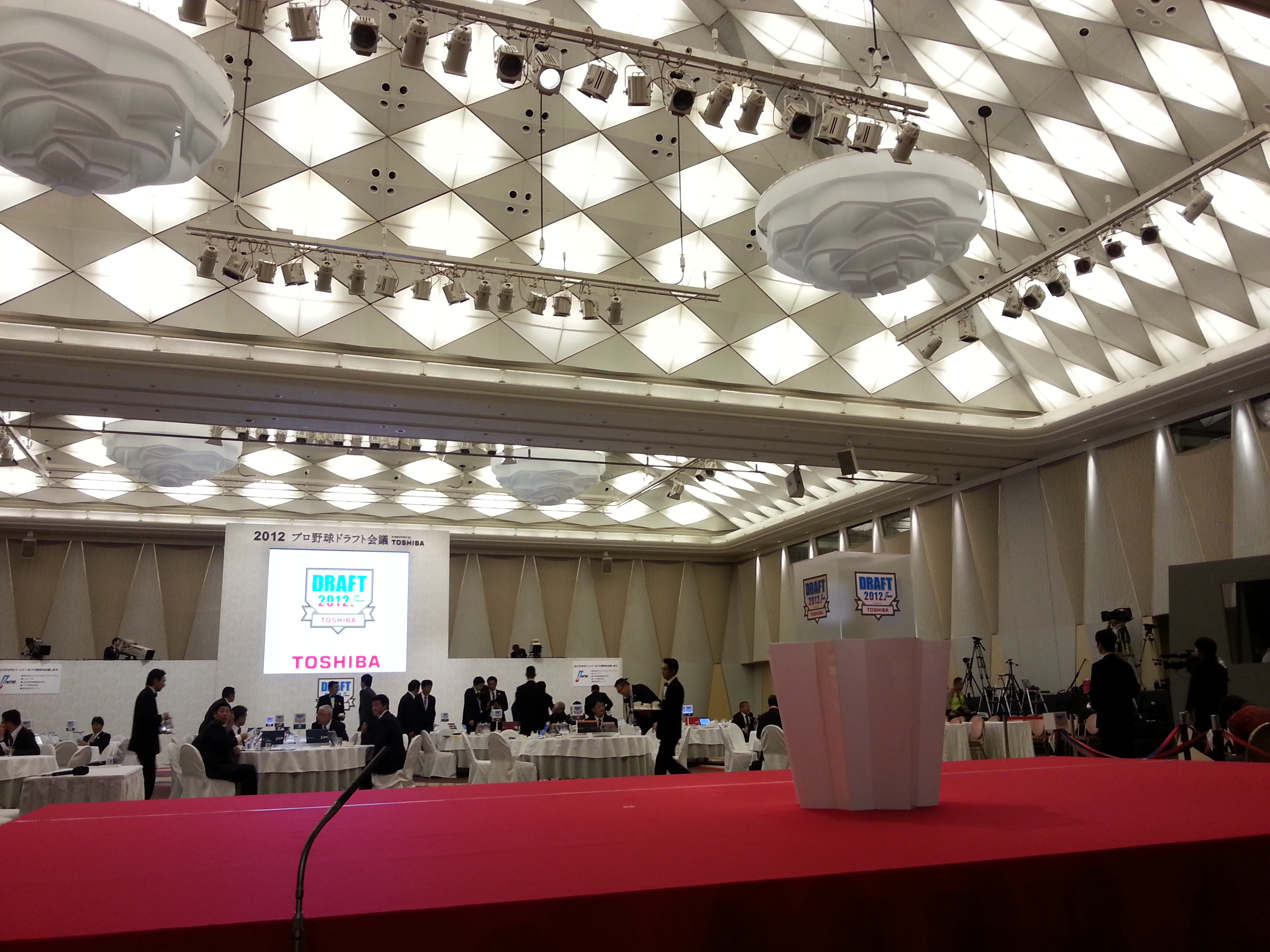
- Draft meeting (2012)
- Conference: Draft meeting
- League: Nippon Professional Baseball
- Sport: Baseball
- Founded: 1965
- Commissioner: Atsushi Saito
- Organizing body: Nippon Professional Baseball Organization (NPB)
- No. of teams: 12
- Country: Japan
- Region: Tokyo
- Broadcaster: TBS Television (Japan)
- Sponsors: Toshiba（2009-2012） Taisho Pharmaceutical（2013-）
- Website: The Professional Baseball Draft Meeting

The Nippon Professional Baseball Draft Meeting is a conference held by the Nippon Professional Baseball Organization (NPB) to select rookie players. The official name of the conference is the Rookie Selection Meeting. Since 2009, the Grand Prince Hotel Takanawa has been used as the venue. It was arranged with the special cooperation of Taisho Pharmaceutical with official naming rights since 2013. The draft was officially called "The Professional Baseball Draft Meeting supported by Lipovitan D ".

== Summary ==
This conference is hosted by the Nippon Professional Baseball Organization (NPB) every October and gives each NPB team the right to negotiate contracts with rookie players based on the procedures stipulated in the Rookie Player Selection Meeting Rules. The draft for Developmental players Selection Meeting will also be held on the same day at the same venue. However, this meeting will only be held if the total number of players selected does not reach 120 at the end of the rookie player selection meeting.

== Regulations ==
=== Current Selection Method ===
First round nominations picks

- The first round picks shall be made by a "bidding lottery" with all teams submitting the names of players they wish to select at the same time.
- In the case of a single pick, the choice of that team will be finalized, and in the case of overlapping picks, the decision will be made by lottery.
- Teams not selected in the lottery will bid again, and if there are duplicate picks, the lottery will be held again to determine the winner, and the process will be repeated until all teams' first round picks are finalized.

After second round picks

- From 2019, the Professional Baseball Executive Committee has decided that the Central League and the Pacific League will be given the second round of waiver priority alternately every other year, and in 2022 Pacific League received the waiver priority.
- From the third round the order is reversed continuing in the same fashion until all picks were exhausted.

Maximum number of picks

- The selection process ends when all teams are "done selecting" or when the total number of players selected reaches 120. However, the number of drafted players does not include those who belong to domestic independent leagues or foreign professional baseball players.
- In principle, each team may pick up to 10 players. However, if the total number of picks does not reach 120 due to other teams completing their selections with fewer than 10 picks, the 11th and subsequent picks may be nominated.

Developmental Players Draft Meeting

- If the total number of players selected at the end of the Rookie Player Selection Conference has not reached 120, a Developmental Players Selection Meeting will be held with the participation of the teams that wish to participate.

=== Players eligible to be picked ===
- The player meets the requirements of Article I of the Rookie Player Selection Meeting Rules. That is, players who have never joined a Japanese professional baseball team in the past and have Japanese nationality or have attended a Japanese junior high school, high school and its equivalent, or university and its equivalent organization.
- Foreign players are eligible for nomination if they have graduated from a Japanese high school or university.

(e.g., Dai-Kang Yang, Kim Mu-young)

- If the player is currently enrolled in a Japanese school, he is expected to graduate in March of the year following the draft meeting; if the player is a university student, he has been enrolled in the school for four years.
- Players who belong to the Japan High School Baseball Federation and the All Japan Collegiate Baseball Federation may only be selected if they have been publicly notified by their respective federations as a submitter of the Application form for professional baseball.
- Players in independent leagues in Japan, such as the Shikoku Island League Plus and the Baseball Challenge League, and free agent Japanese players who belonged to leagues outside Japan, such as Major League Baseball.

Players who cannot be nominated

- Athletes who withdrew from the school after April 1 of the year in which the draft meeting was held.
- Players who have not submitted an Application form for professional baseball, and players who have been public noticed ineligible for the NPB Draft by the All Japan Collegiate Baseball Federation.
- Players who are members of the Japan Baseball Federation (Amateur players from companies and baseball clubs) under an agreement with the Federation may not be drafted for two seasons after registering with the Federation. However, players who have graduated from high school and junior high school will not be drafted for three seasons after registration. No more than two pitchers may be selected from the same team without the approval of the team and the Nippon Professional Baseball Federation.

Prohibition of assignment of negotiating rights

- The right to negotiate a player contract acquired at the Draft Meeting may not be waived or transferred to another team. (Rookie Player Selection Conference Rules, Article10)

Term of validity and loss of bargaining rights

- If a team fails to finalise a contract with a drafted player before the end of March the year following the selection meeting; The team shall forfeit its right to negotiate a contract with that player; However, the right to negotiate a contract with a player already in the NPB shall expire at the end of January the year following the selection meeting. (Rookie Player Selection Conference Rules, Article11)

== See also ==
- Nippon Professional Baseball
- Nippon Professional Baseball rosters
- Developmental player system
