= Sanyo Crowns =

Sanyo Crowns (山陽クラウンズ)

Information
- League: Kansai Farm League (1952)
- Ballpark: Himeji Stadium
- Established: 1950
- Folded: 1952
- Ownership: Sanyo Electric Railway

Sanyo Crowns was a baseball team that played a single season in 1952 in the Kansai Farm League.

Formed in September 1950 by the Sanyo Electric Railway Company and officially called Sanyo Electric Railway Baseball Club and played at Himeji Stadium (not the stadium built in 1959) in Himeji, Hyogo Prefecture.

Unlike the other teams in the Kansai Farm Team it was not affiliated with any team in the Nippon Professional Baseball League.

The team only played their first season with the farm league and folded in October 1952.
