= Shūdō Higashinakano =

Japanese historian (born 1947)

- Born: October 19, 1947 (age 78); Kagoshima Prefecture, Japan
- Other name: 東中野 修道

Academic background
- Education: Kagoshima University (BA); Osaka University

Academic work
- Discipline: History
- Institutions: Asia University

Shūdō Higashinakano (東中野 修道, Higashinakano Shūdō; born October 19, 1947) is a Japanese historian and conspiracy therorist. He is an emeritus professor of intellectual history at Asia University.

== Biography ==
Higashinakano came to public attention when he criticized Iris Chang's 1997 book The Rape of Nanking. He argued in an opinion column that appeared in Sankei Shimbun that the book was "pure baloney", alleging that there was "no witness of illegal executions or murders". Referring to the war crimes trial in Tokyo after World War II, he opined that "there existed no 'Rape of Nanking' as alleged by the Tokyo Trial." He claimed to have identified 90 historical factual errors in the first 64 pages of The Rape of Nanking. In the 1998 Penguin Books edition, four minor edits were made, none of which were related to the Japanese atrocities committed in China.

Higashinakano presented his arguments in his book Thorough Review of Nanjing Massacre (published in English as The Nanking Massacre: Fact versus Fiction, 1998). In 2006, Xia Shuqin (夏淑琴), a Chinese woman whose testimony he sought to discredit in his book, took Higashinakano to court in China, winning 1.6 million yuan in damages. Higashinakano had claimed that she had not been a witness of the Nanjing Massacre and was not the child filmed by the missionary John Magee during the event. The case was later pursued in Japanese courts. On February 5, 2009, the Supreme Court of Japan ordered Higashinakano to pay JPY 4 million in damages to Xia Shuqin, asserting that he had libelously defamed her. Higashinakano and his publisher Tendensha appealed, but lost their case. Higashinakano was unable to prove that Xia and the girl in the film were different people.
