= Shoki Oda =

Japanese baseball player (born 2008)

- Pitcher
- Born: July 3, 2008 (age 18); Kitakyushu, Fukuoka Prefecture, Japan
- Bats: Right Throws: Right

Shoki Oda (織田 翔希, Oda Shoki; born July 3, 2008) is a Japanese baseball pitcher.

== Career ==
Oda attended Yokohama High School in Yokohama. In his second year, Oda, alongside Yorito Okumura, led Yokohama to win the 2025 Japanese High School Baseball Invitational Tournament.

In the 2026 High School Baseball Championship, Oda recorded a pitch of 156 km/h (97 mph), breaking the tournament record that was previously shared by Yoshinori Sato, Tomohiro Anraku and Genki Ishigaki. Against eventual champions Chiben Gakuen Wakayama in the quarterfinals, Oda gave up a three-run home run that led to their defeat. On August 22, 2026, Oda was called up to the Japan national under-18 baseball team for the U-18 Asian Baseball Championship.

Despite being projected as one of the top prospects for the 2026 Nippon Professional Baseball draft, Oda announced on October 15 that he would instead pursue a career in the United States. On October 21, the Yomiuri Giants selected Oda with their first round pick in the NPB draft.
