= Kazunari Ishii =

Japanese baseball player (born 1994)

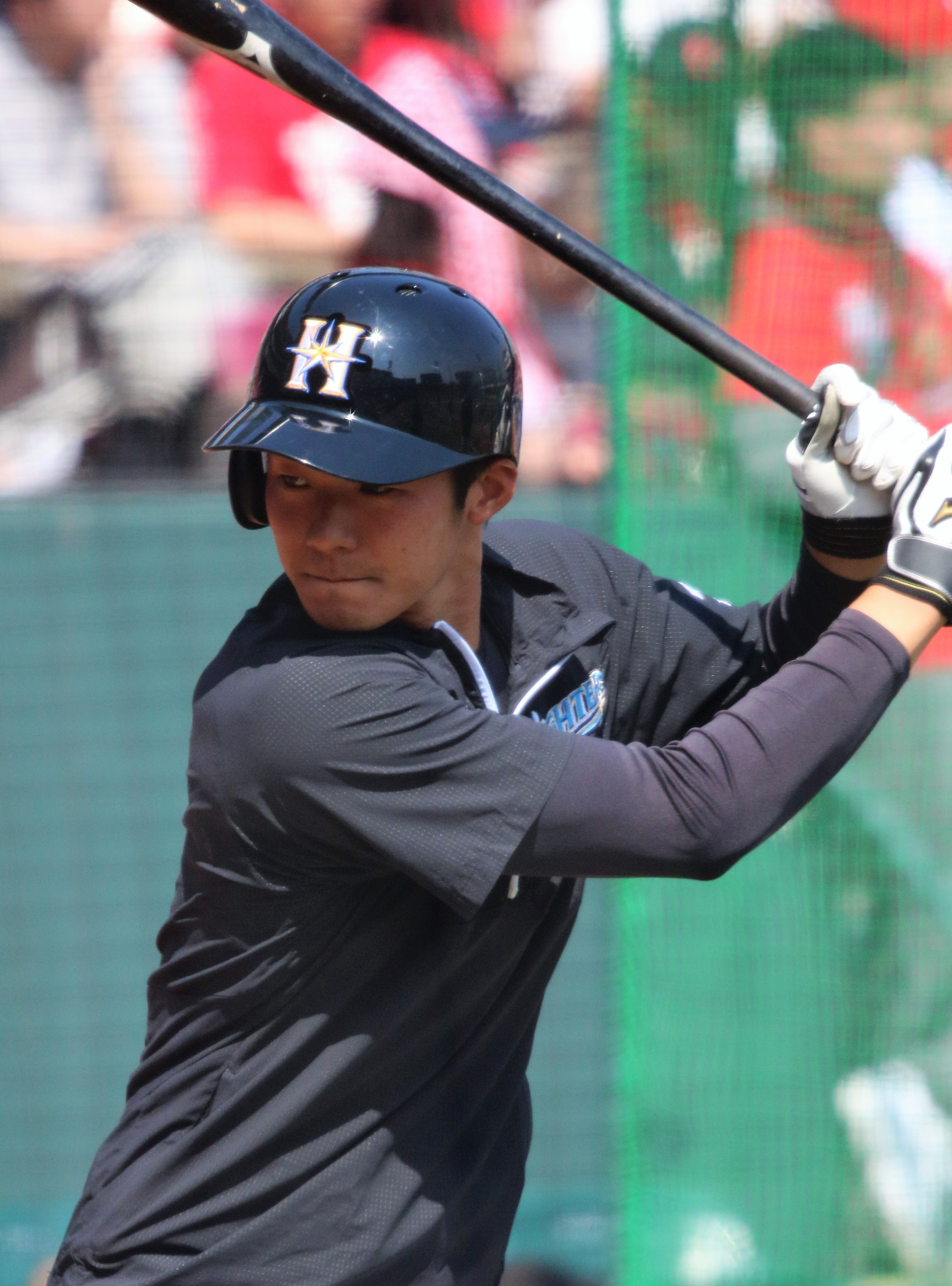

Saitama Seibu Lions – No. 4
- Infielder
- Born: May 6, 1994 (age 32); Tochigi, Japan
- Bats: Left Throws: Right

NPB debut
- March 31, 2017, for the Hokkaido Nippon-Ham Fighters

NPB statistics (through 2025 season)
- Batting average: .223
- Home runs: 28
- Runs batted in: 156
- Stats at Baseball Reference

Teams
- Hokkaido Nippon-Ham Fighters (2017–2025); Saitama Seibu Lions (2026–present)

Kazunari Ishii (石井 一成, Ishii Kazunari; born May 6, 1994) is a Japanese professional baseball infielder for the Saitama Seibu Lions of Nippon Professional Baseball (NPB). He has previously played in NPB for the Hokkaido Nippon-Ham Fighters.

His younger brother Takumi is also a professional baseball player who plays for Tokyo Yakult Swallows.
