= Shunya Shimada =

Japanese baseball player (born 2003)

Yokohama DeNA BayStars – No. 15
- Pitcher
- Born: 30 April 2003 (age 23); Totsuka-ku, Yokohama, Kanagawa, Japan
- Bats: Right Throws: Right

NPB debut
- 29 April, 2026, for the Yokohama DeNA BayStars

Career statistics (through 22 August 2026)
- Win–loss record: 1–1
- Earned run average: 5.03
- Strikeouts: 16
- Saves: 0
- Holds: 0

Teams
- Yokohama DeNA BayStars (2026–present)

Career highlights and awards
- Pitched an immaculate inning on 13 May 2026

Shunya Shimada (島田舜也, Shunya Shimada; born 30 April 2003) is a Japanese professional baseball player. He is a pitcher for the Yokohama DeNA BayStars of Nippon Professional Baseball (NPB).

== Career ==
Shimada was selected by Yokohama DeNA BayStars in the second round of the 2025 NPB draft. He made his Nippon Professional Baseball (NPB) debut on 29 April 2026. On 13 May 2026, in the fifth inning, Shimada pitched an immaculate inning and led to a 5–0 shutout victory and secured his first career win. This was the 23rd immaculate inning in the NPB and he is the second rookie to do so since 1954, when Takao Kajimoto accomplished the same feat. Shimada was the first rookie in the history of the Central League to throw an immaculate inning.
