= Kazuyuki Takemaru =

Japanese baseball player (born 2002)

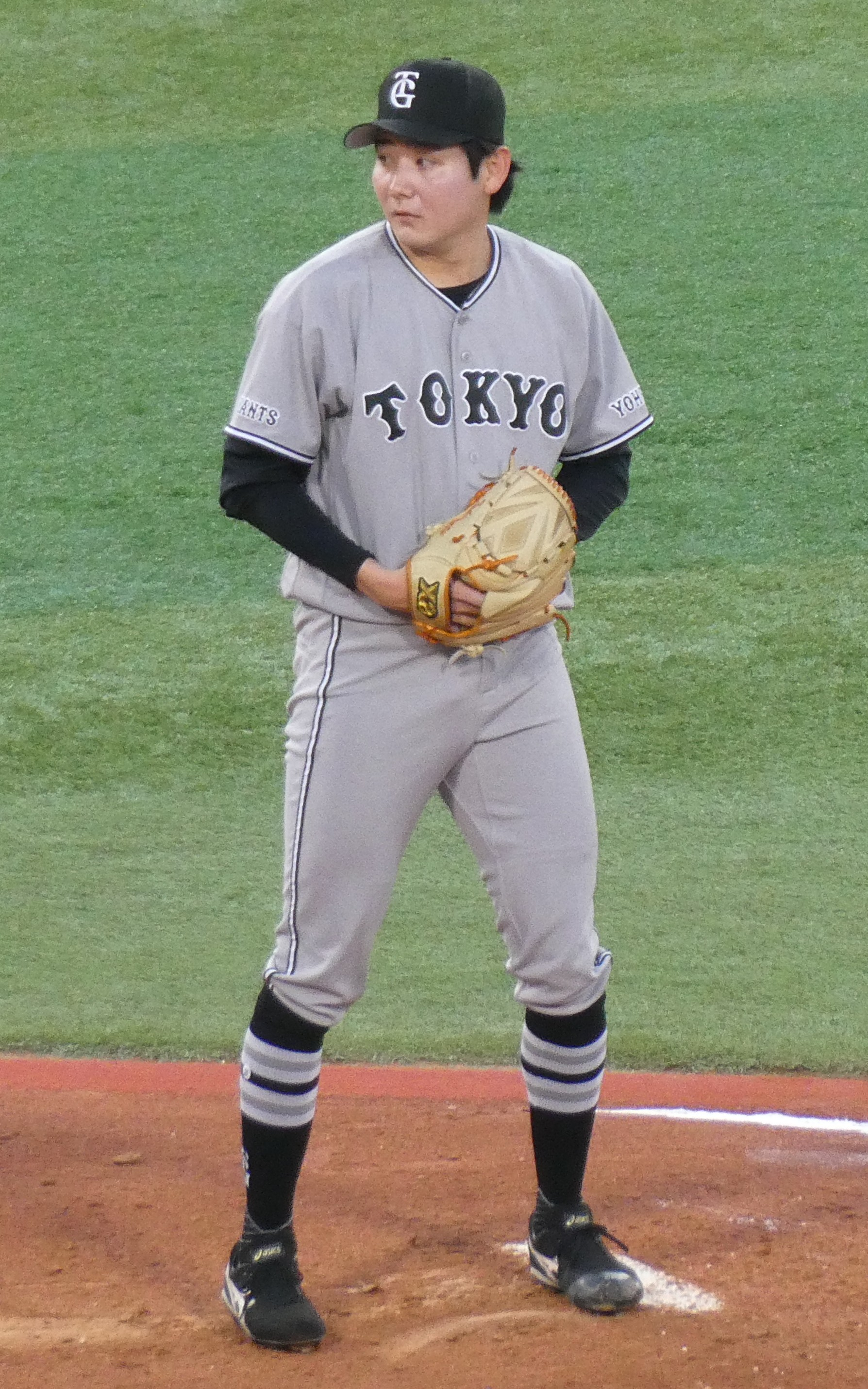

Yomiuri Giants – No. 21
- Pitcher
- Born: February 26, 2002 (age 24); Hiroshima, Hiroshima, Japan
- Bats: Left Throws: Left

NPB debut
- March 27, 2026, for the Yomiuri Giants

Career statistics (through August 1, 2026)
- Win–loss record: 7–8
- Earned run average: 3.54
- Strikeouts: 101

Teams
- Yomiuri Giants (2026–present)

Kazuyuki Takemaru (竹丸 和幸, Takemaru Kazuyuki; born February 26, 2002, in Hiroshima, Hiroshima, Japan) is a professional Japanese baseball player. He is a pitcher for the Yomiuri Giants of Nippon Professional Baseball (NPB).
