= Ruan Ohtsuka =

Japanese baseball player (born 2003)

Hokkaido Nippon-Ham Fighters – No. 49
- Infielder
- Born: October 26, 2003 (age 22); Tochigi, Tochigi, Japan
- Bats: Left Throws: Right

NPB debut
- April 17, 2026, for the Hokkaido Nippon-Ham Fighters

Teams
- Hokkaido Nippon-Ham Fighters (2026–present)

Ruan Ohtsuka (大塚 瑠晏, Ohtsuka Ruan; born October 26, 2003) is a Japanese professional baseball infielder for the Hokkaido Nippon-Ham Fighters in Nippon Professional Baseball.
