= Ren Tawa =

Japanese baseball player (born 2003)

Yomiuri Giants – No. 30
- Pitcher
- Born: May 2, 2003 (age 23); Kyoto, Kyoto, Japan
- Bats: Right Throws: Right

NPB debut
- March 28, 2026, for the Yomiuri Giants

Career statistics (through 2026 season)
- Win–loss record: 0-0
- Earned run average: 1.91
- Strikeouts: 18
- Saves: 0
- Holds: 3
- Stats at Baseball Reference

Teams
- Yomiuri Giants (2026–present)

Ren Tawa (田和 廉, Tawa Ren; born May 2, 2003, in Kyoto, Kyoto, Japan) is a professional Japanese baseball player. He is a pitcher for the Yomiuri Giants of Nippon Professional Baseball (NPB).
