= Hakua Iwaki =

Japanese baseball player (born 2001)

Saitama Seibu Lions – No. 20
- Pitcher
- Born: September 17, 2003 (age 22); Nakaniikawa, Toyama, Japan
- Bats: Left Throws: Left

NPB debut
- March 31, 2026, for the Saitama Seibu Lions

Teams
- Saitama Seibu Lions (2026–present)

Career highlights and awards
- 1× NPB All-Star (2026)

Hakua Iwaki (岩城 颯空, Iwaki Hakua; born September 17, 2003) is a Japanese professional baseball pitcher for the Saitama Seibu Lions of Nippon Professional Baseball (NPB).
