= Takumi Ishii =

Japanese baseball player (born 2002)

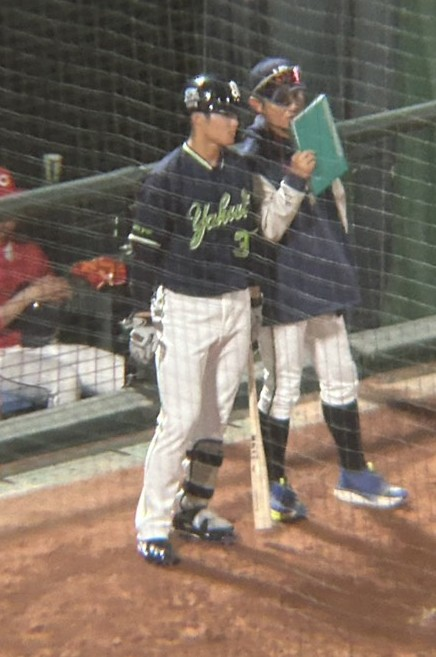
- Ishii with the Tokyo Yakult Swallows

Tokyo Yakult Swallows – No. 38
- Infielder
- Born: March 2, 2002 (age 24); Nasu, Tochigi, Japan
- Bats: Right Throws: Right

NPB debut
- May 9, 2026, for the Tokyo Yakult Swallows

Teams
- Tokyo Yakult Swallows (2026–present)

Takumi Ishii (石井 巧, Ishii Takumi; born March 2, 2002) is a Japanese professional baseball infielder for the Tokyo Yakult Swallows of Nippon Professional Baseball (NPB).

His elder brother Kazunari is also a professional baseball player.
