= Nippon Professional Baseball rosters =

A Nippon Professional Baseball team's roster is the group of players who are, by the NPB Agreement, allowed to play in Nippon Professional Baseball's top-fight leagues, the Central League and the Pacific League (NPB Agreement, Article 81). This list is created from each team's list of players under control (Article 52), and players can be registered to the roster arbitrarily and at any time during the season (Article 85). Changes to the rosters are announced by NPB every day for the duration of the season.

== Summary ==
A team's roster consists of up to 29 registered players who may play in official Central League or Pacific League matches (Article 81.2). For any given match, 25 players may be benched. Up to four non-Japanese players can be registered at any one time; of those, no more than three may be pitchers, and no more than three may be position players (Article 82-2). Players can be removed from the roster at any time for any reason and replaced with another player under control. Any player removed from the roster may return to the roster once ten days have passed, after which the team can re-register the player at any time during the season (Article 85). Because players can be removed without penalty, players are repeatedly removed from the roster and re-registered for strategic reasons, such as reorganizing the rotation of starting pitchers or allowing younger players to get experience playing against top-flight opponents. As of the 2024 season, up to 31 players can be registered due to special measures to prevent the spread of infection due to the effects of COVID-19, and up to 26 of may enter the bench. Additionally the same measures allow up to 5 foreign players to be registered. However, only four foreign players may be benched. If no matches are played for ten days for scheduling reasons, all players will be removed from the roster.

Registered players are also called first-squad players. Non-registered players are called second-squad players or third-squad players, and play in the second-flight Eastern League or Western League. Second- or third-squad players also play some unofficial games against teams from independent or corporate leagues (Article 81, Article 170). Unlike in Major League Baseball (MLB), where minor-league players belong primarily to minor-league teams, the second- and third-squad players all belong to the same NPB team, with differences in contracts being limited to salaries and contract duration. Developmental players may not be registered and may not play in official Central League or Pacific League matches.

For the play-offs and the Japan Series, teams select a roster of 40 players. These players may not be replaced by players not on the 40-player roster.

== Exceptions ==
Players who have been removed from the roster due to suspected concussion may return to the roster even if the ten days since removal have not passed. The player who is designated as a replacement for the player with a suspected concussion is also allowed to return early if removed from the roster due to the former player's return.

When a retiring player participates in an official match as his retirement match, for the day of his retirement match, that player may be added to the team's roster without removing another player.

During the COVID-19 pandemic, players suspected of having COVID-19 who were removed from the roster were permitted to be re-added before ten days if they tested negative.

== Other regulations ==
The minimum annual salary of first-squad players is 16 million yen (Article 89-2.1). Players with salaries less than 16 million yen must be paid a bonus proportional to their number of days on the roster.

Free agency attained based on the number years register to the roster. Players with at least 145 days registered to the roster are given one year of credit towards free agency. Registered days from seasons with less than 145 days registered to the roster are accumulated separately, with 145 accumulated days counting as one year.

== See also ==
- Nippon Professional Baseball
- Nippon Professional Baseball Agreement
- List of current Nippon Professional Baseball team rosters
- Registration of players under control
- Developmental player system
