= Ayuto Matsushita =

Japanese baseball player (born 2003)

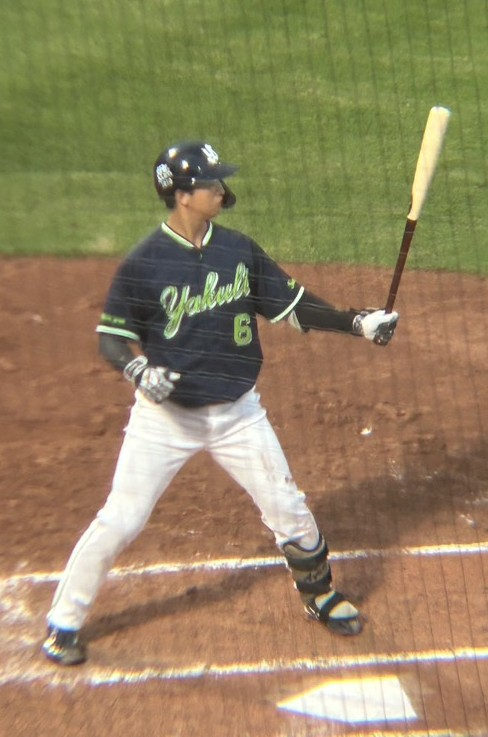
- Nagaoka with the Tokyo Yakult Swallows

Tokyo Yakult Swallows – No. 6
- Infielder
- Born: April 14, 2003 (age 23); Minamiashigara, Kanagawa, Japan
- Bats: Right Throws: Right

NPB debut
- May 29, 2026, for the Tokyo Yakult Swallows

Teams
- Tokyo Yakult Swallows (2026–present)

Ayuto Matsushita (松下 歩叶, Matsushita Ayuto; born April 14, 2003) is a Japanese professional baseball infielder for the Tokyo Yakult Swallows of Nippon Professional Baseball (NPB).
