= Tohoku Fukushi University =

Private university in Sendai, Miyagi, Japan

Coordinates: 38°16′47″N 140°50′53″E

- 東北福祉大学
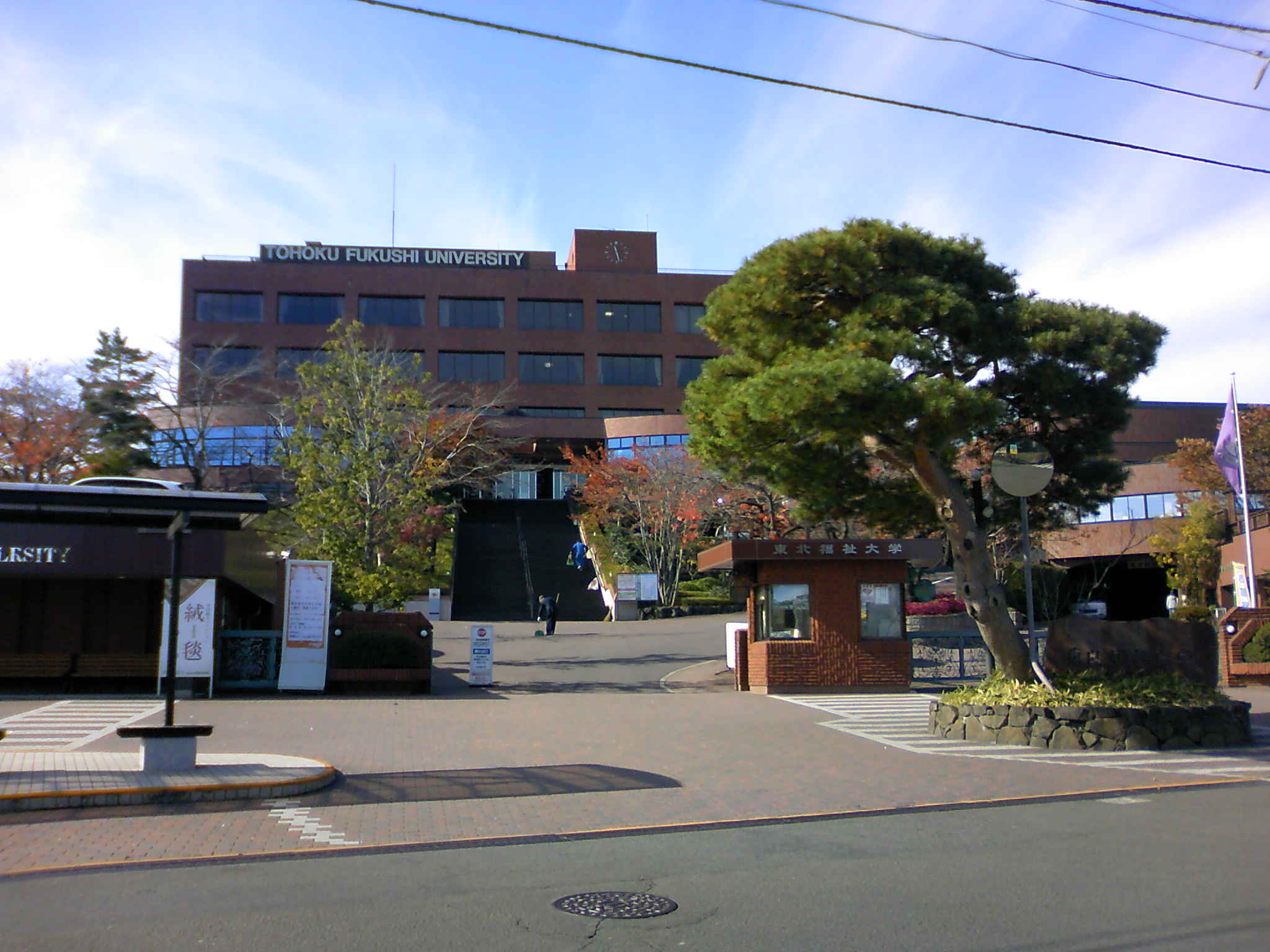
- Tohoku Fukushi University
- Type: Private
- Established: 1875 / 1962
- Location: Aoba-ku, Sendai, Miyagi Prefecture, Japan
- Website: www.tfu.ac.jp

Tohoku Fukushi University (東北福祉大学, Tōhoku Fukushi daigaku) is a Japanese private university in Sendai.

== Notable alumni ==
=== Politics ===
- Shintaro Ito
- Itsunori Onodera

=== Sports ===
- Baseball
  - Mamoru Kishida
  - Takashi Saito
  - Kazuhiro Sasaki
  - Kazuhiro Wada
  - Ken Kadokura
  - Tomoaki Kanemoto
- Figure skating
  - Akiko Suzuki
- Golf
  - Hidemasa Hoshino
  - Hiroshi Iwata
  - Yūsaku Miyazato
  - Hideto Tanihara
  - Hideki Matsuyama

=== Visual arts ===
- Leiji Matsumoto

== Notable professors ==
- John Stevens (scholar)
