= Developmental Player System =

The Developmental Player System (育成選手制度, Ikusei Sensyu Seido) is a system that allows players to be held for the purpose of training players separately from the 70 registered players under control of each team created in the fall of 2005 at Nippon Professional Baseball (NPB). It is akin to the practice squads seen in other sports.

== Summary ==
The system was established in 2005 to create an environment in which amateur players could gain playing experience after company-owned amateur baseball teams were folding following the economic recession of the Lost Decades. Players who are part of the system are considered "semi-controlled" in that they play for the team they are signed to but they are not a controlled player and thus their team doe not have exclusive rights to them.

The Developmental Player System include players drafted as rookies (e.g. Yusuke Kosai, Michitaka Nishiyama), foreign players signed as developmental players (e.g., Raidel Martínez, Liván Moinelo), players drafted as registered players under control but re-signed with a team as developmental players due to their abilities (e.g., Kenta Kurose), players who became free agents with their former team and signed with another team (e.g., Masaru Nakamura, Kouya Fujii), and players who were removed from the registration of players under control and re-signed as a developmental player as an injury rehabilitation assignment (e.g., Takuya Kuwahara, Hiroya Shimamoto). There is an argument that de-registering players who cannot play due to injury and re-signing them as developmental players will protect their careers; on the other hand, the use of the developmental players system, instead of systems like the Major League Baseball (MLB) Injured list, is criticized as contrary to the original intent of this system to develop and provide opportunities to amateur players. The oldest player to become a developmental player is Soichi Fujita, who signed in 2011 at the age of 39. The longest period as a developmental player was Kousuke Naruse's eight seasons (2011-2018) as of the 2022 season.

== Regulations for Developmental Players ==
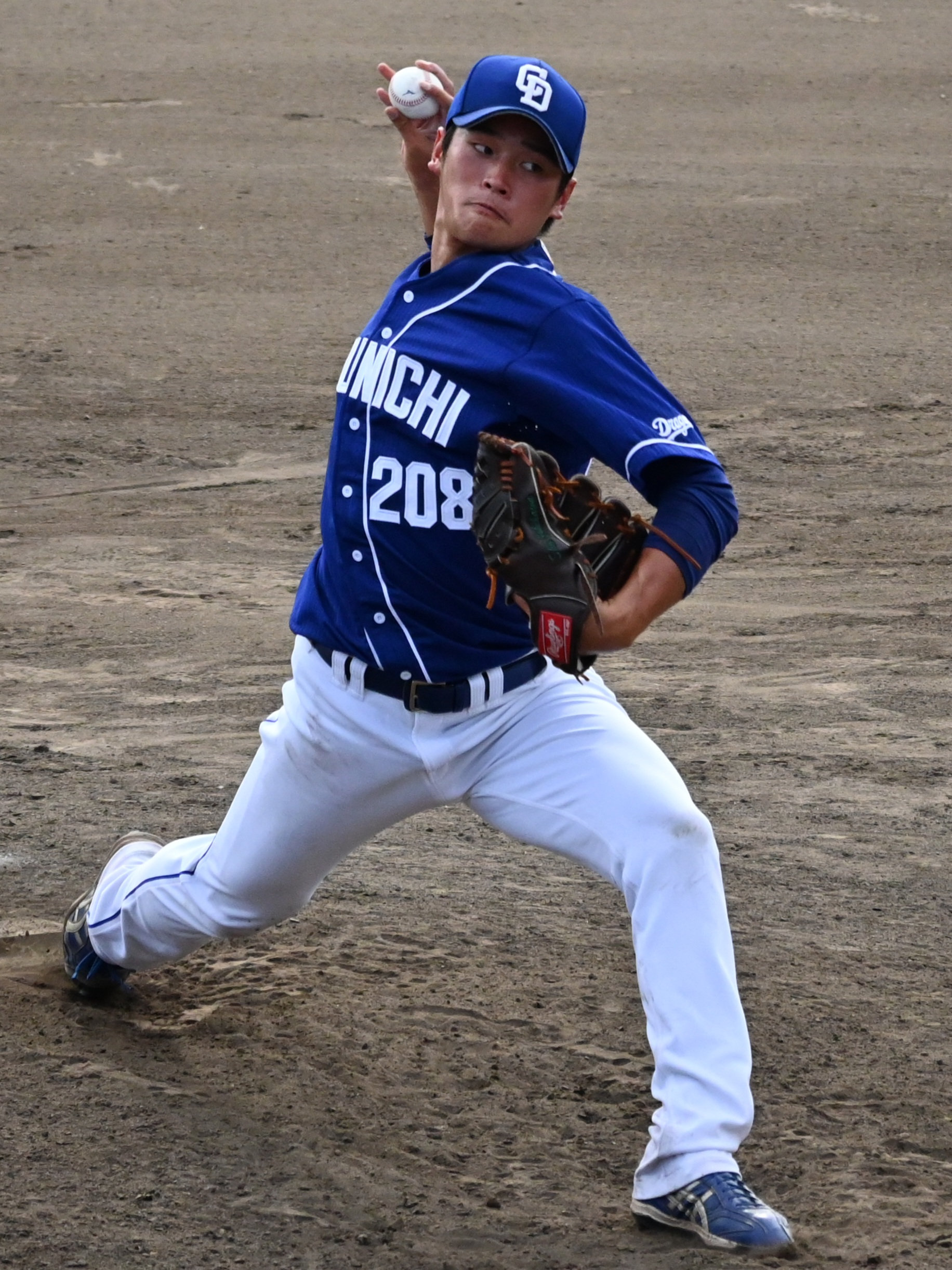
Pitcher Shō Ishikawa, wearing the distinctive three-digit uniform number unique to players in the Developmental Player System.

Player Rules

- Developmental players are not allowed to participate in official NPB games. However, up to five players per team per game are allowed to play in the Eastern League and Western League, the NPB's minor leagues. These minor league farm teams are considered a team's second squad. If a team as a large amount of developmental and minor league players, they may form a third squad and play in games against independent league teams (such as the Shikoku Island League Plus and Baseball Challenge League), corporate amateur teams, or university teams. The Fukuoka SoftBank Hawks's third squad plays more than 100 games a year. While there is a difference in contract between a registered players under control and a developmental players, unlike the relationship between players Major League Baseball and Minor League Baseball in North America, all NPB are players on the same team regardless of which squad they are on, and use the same practice facility and player dormitory.
- A Developmental Player System contract is for a maximum of three years. After this contract expires, the player can become a free agent once and sign with the same team again for a one year extension. After the fourth season, and each subsequent season, the NPB will announce the player's free agent status. This measure is intended to increase the player's chances of signing a registration of players under control contract, and during the free agent period, he can negotiate with other teams. For example, in 2019, Hiroki Hasegawa moved from the Fukuoka Softbank Hawks to the Tokyo Yakult Swallows. A one-year contract is also possible for a registered players under control to re-sign as a developmental player after a free agent announcement has been made. Players who have not been under contract for three seasons will be placed on the roster of pending developmental players, and other teams will not be able to negotiate with them.
- The minimum salary is ¥2.4 million and ¥3 million is paid as a preparation fee when drafted. However, since there is no cap on annual salary, some teams sign players at higher salaries, and players who are re-signed as developmental players from a registered players under control often maintain the salary level of a registered players under control.
- A developmental player's uniform number will be a three-digit number (e.g. 001, 101, or 201) in the numbers of other players and staff being one- or two-digits.

Regulations for teams that own developmental players

- The deadline for re-signing a developmental player to a registered player under control contract is from the end of the season to July 31st during the following season. However, teams are not permitted to change a player's contract status from a registered under control to developmental during the season.
- Developmental players can only be owned by teams with at least 65 controlled players on their roster by July 31 each eason, and teams with fewer than 65 controlled players cannot own them. However, if a team reports to the Executive Committee that it has re-signed a developmental player as a controlled player or acquired a new controlled player to bring the number of controlled players to 65 or more, and if this is approved, the team may retain the developmental player. There is no limit to the number of developmental players owned and how many a team has depends on the team's policy. For example, the Yomiuri Giants and Fukuoka SoftBank Hawks often have more than 30 developmental players, enough to field a third-level squad; conversely, the Hanshin Tigers tend to have only a few players. The Fukuoka SoftBank Hawks selected 14 new developmental players in the 2022 draft to implement a four-team system starting in the 2023 season.

Developmental Players Draft Meeting

- If the total number of players selected at the end of the Rookie Player Selection Conference has not reached 120, a Developmental Players Selection Meeting will be held with the participation of the teams that wish to participate.

Developmental players trade

- Article 11 of the Nippon Professional Baseball Developed Player Regulations states that a trade of a developmental player held by July 31 is allowed, but as of the 2022 season, there are no examples of such a trade.

== Outcome ==
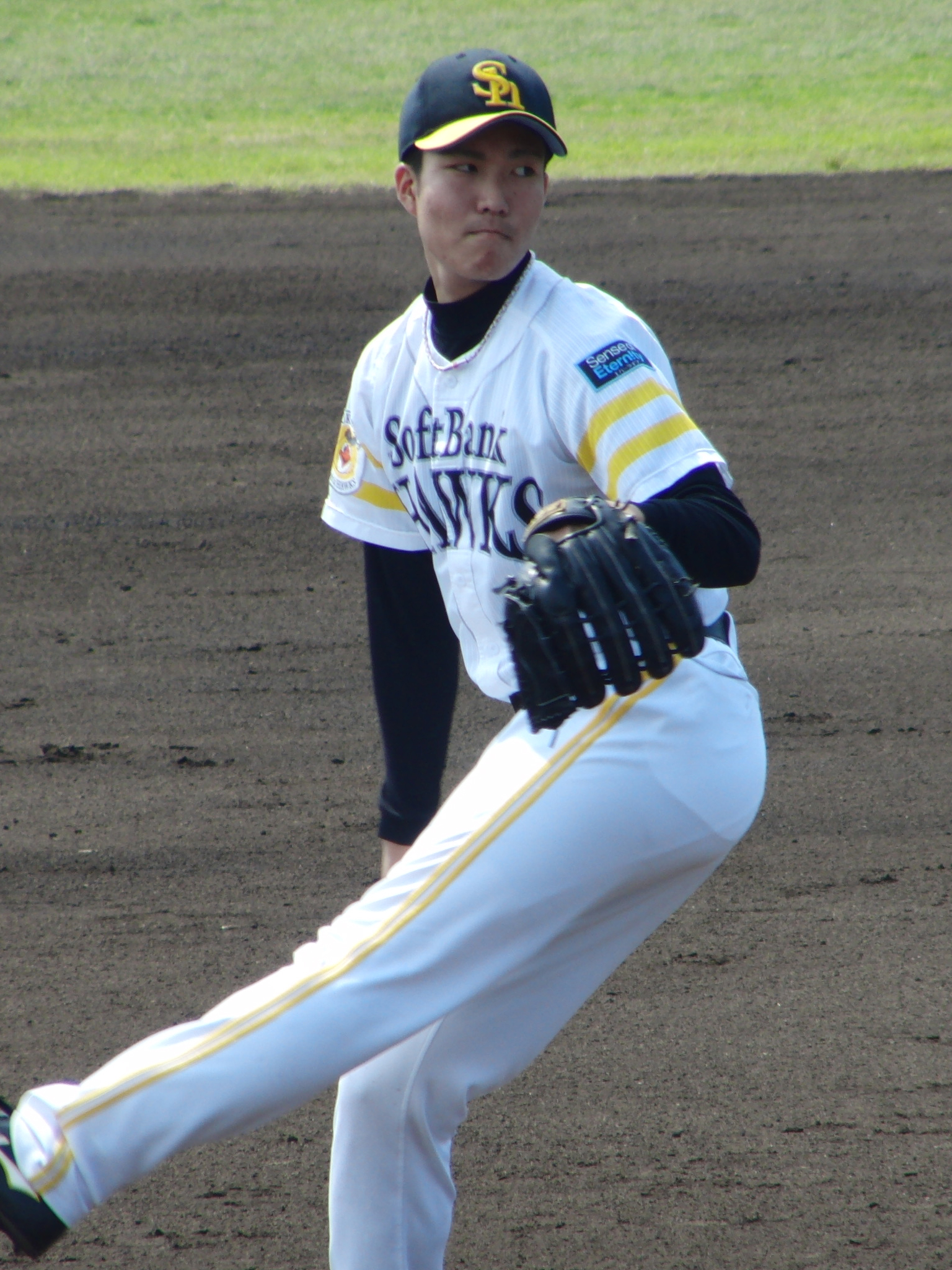
Kodai Senga with the Fukuoka SoftBank Hawks

The developmental player system, which began in the 2005 season, has been successful in producing major players for each team (e.g. Yoshiki Sunada, Yuji Nishino). The Yomiuri Giants, who have been heavily utilizing this system since the beginning, have signed more than 50 developmental players as their registered players under control as of the 2022 season. The Fukuoka Softbank Hawks have also signed 40 developmental players as their registered players under control, and have produced players like Kodai Senga and Takuya Kai who have won league titles and awards and represented Japanese baseball on the national baseball team. The Hokkaido Nippon-Ham Fighters, which had been reluctant to acquire developmental players, drafted a player as a developmental player for the first time in the 2018 draft. In the 2022 draft, 51 players will be selected as developmental players, the largest number in history, and the acquisition of developmental players is a growing trend.

Holders of league titles and awards from developmental players
Player name	Team	enrollment	League Titles and Awards
Shuta Ishikawa	Fukuoka SoftBank Hawks	2013 Draft.	1× Pacific League winning percentage leader (2020); 1× Pacific League the most wins Champion (2020); Pitched a no-hitter on August 18, 2023
Takuya Kai	Fukuoka SoftBank Hawks	2010 Draft.	6× Pacific League Golden Glove Award (2017–2022); 3× Pacific League Best Nine Award (2017, 2020. 2022)
Raidel Martínez	Chunichi Dragons	Signed in 2017.	1× Central League Saves leader (2022)
Tetsuya Matsumoto	Yomiuri Giants	2006 Draft.	1× Central League Rookie of the Year (2009)
Liván Moinelo	Fukuoka SoftBank Hawks	Signed in 2017.	1× Pacific League Best Relief Pitcher Award (2020); 1× Pacific League Holds leader (2020)
Yoshifumi Okada	Chiba Lotte Marines	2008 Draft.	2× Pacific League Golden Glove Award (2011, 2012)
Yariel Rodríguez	Chunichi Dragons	Signed in 2020.	1× Central League Best Relief Pitcher Award (2022); 1× Central League Holds leader (2022)
Kodai Senga	Fukuoka SoftBank Hawks	2010 Draft.	2× Pacific League strikeout leader (2019, 2020); 1× Pacific League ERA leader (2020); 1× Pacific League winning percentage leader (2017); 1× Pacific League the most wins champion (2020); 2× Pacific League Best Nine Award (2019, 2020); 2× Pacific League Golden Glove Award (2019, 2020); Pitched a no-hitter on September 6, 2019
Ukyo Shuto	Fukuoka SoftBank Hawks	2017 Draft.	1×Pacific League Stolen bases Leader (2020)
Tetsuya Yamaguchi	Yomiuri Giants	2005 Draft.	1× Central League Rookie of the Year (2009); 3× Central League Best Relief Pitcher Award (2009, 2012-2013)

== Current developmental player rosters ==
=== Central League ===
Current Central League Developmental players rosters 2026

Position	Players		source
Chunichi Dragons
Pitchers	203 Kenya Inoue (ja:井上剣也); 205 Shota Habu (ja:土生翔太); 211 Kodai Umetsu	213 Akio Moriyama (ja:森山暁生); 219 Randy Martínez	
Catchers	206 Ryunosuke Yamaasa (ja:山浅龍之介)		
Infielders	202 Naiki Nakamura (ja:中村奈一輝); 207 Keishi Tsuda (ja:津田啓史)	216 Taiga Ishikawa (ja:石川大峨); 218 Rii Kawakami (ja:川上理偉)	
Outfielders	217 Aisuke Mikami (ja:三上愛介)		
Hanshin Tigers
Pitchers	122 Ippei Ogawa; 123 Kai Matsubara (ja:松原快)	125 Ryo Itoh (ja:伊藤稜); 132 Anthony Martinez (ja:アンソニー・マルティネス	
Infielders	130 Toshiaki Kawasaki (ja:川﨑俊哲)	130 Jean Arnaez (ja:ジーン・アルナエス)	
Outfielders	120 Junya Nishi; 130 Shuei Yamasaki (ja:山﨑照英)	134 Stanley Consuegra (ja:スタンリー・コンスエグラ)	
Hiroshima Toyo Carp
Pitchers	123 Tsubasa Kobune (ja:小船翼); 126 Kaito Takeshita (ja:竹下海斗); 127 Kei Kawano (ja:河野佳)	127 Mirai Sugihara (ja:杉原望来); 120 Develson Aria	
Catchers	122 Toshiki Yasutake (ja:安竹俊喜)	124 Yuta Kobayashi	
Infielders	125 Daiki Kishimoto	130 Moises Ramirez	
Outfielders	131 Nelson Robert (ja:ネルソン・ロベルト)		
Tokyo Yakult Swallows
Pitchers	013 Hyūga Takeyama (ja:竹山日向); 015 Yume Komiya (ja:小宮悠瞳); 016 Yusei Nishihama (ja:西濱勇星)	017 Shōsei (ja:髙橋翔聖); 019 Takuma Sato (ja:佐藤琢磨 (野球))	
Catchers	022 Ryunosuke Matsumoto (ja:松本龍之介)	027 Takuma Nakagawa (ja:中川拓真)	
Infielders	025 Tatsunori Negishi (ja:根岸辰昇)	016 Yusei Nishihama (ja:西濱勇星)	
Yokohama DeNA BayStars
Pitchers	102 Manato Shimizu (ja:清水麻成); 103 Koki Kanabuchi (ja:金渕光希); 111 Haru Yoshioka (ja:吉岡暖)	136 Ryudai Morishita (ja:森下瑠大); 140 Ryunosuke Matsumoto (ja:松本隆之介)	
Catchers	127 Ryota Joko (ja:上甲凌大)	130 Taiga Kondoh (ja:近藤大雅)	
Infielders	125 Soh Ogasawara (ja:小笠原蒼); 129 Kenji Nishimaki	131 Uta Shimizu (ja:清水詩太)	
Outfielders	155 Daiki Kobari (ja:小針大輝)		
Yomiuri Giants
Pitchers	011 Eijiro Tomishige (ja:冨重英二郎); 012 Kira Hayashi (ja:林燦); 014 Shotaro Horie (ja:堀江正太郎); 015 Keishin Suzuki; 016 Takahiro Chiba (ja:千葉隆広); 018 Motoya Kinoshita (ja:木下幹也); 019 Junki Sonoda (ja:園田純規); 021 Hayate Matsui (ja:松井颯); 023 Tomoki Tamura (ja:田村朋輝); 026 Yusefu Yoshimura (ja:吉村優聖歩); 028 Ryu Tomida (ja:富田龍)	029 Ayumu Nishikawa; 030 Shido Fukita; 034 Tessei Morimoto (ja:森本哲星); 041 Huang Chin-hao (ja:黃錦豪); 042 Francis Guzmán; 047 Yusaku Kawano; 050 Yugo Bandoh; 063 Yuki Hanada (ja:花田侑樹); 077 Hayato Ishita (ja:石田隼都); 090 Juza Ishida (ja:石田充冴); 099 Makoto Kyomoto (ja:京本眞)	
Catchers	006 Rentaro Matsui; 009 Lee Kun-Hee; 020 Ryusuke Kita	022 Keita Kameda; 024 Tatsuya Sakamoto (ja:坂本達也)	
Infielders	002 Ayumu Nakata (ja:中田歩夢); 004 Gen Murayama (ja:村山源); 005 Yuya Tanoue (ja:田上優弥)	025 Raia Takeshita (ja:竹下徠空); 027 Rio Kitamura (ja:北村流音); 067 Jumpei Kawarada	
Outfielders	008 Hakuto Aizawa (ja:相澤白虎)	049 Christían Feliz	

=== Pacific League ===
Current Pacific League Developmental players rosters 2026

Position	Players		source
Chiba Lotte Marines
Pitchers	121 Fumiya Motomae; 123 Seiun Akiyama (ja:秋山正雲); 124 Ryota Nakamura; 125 Kirato Nagashimada (ja:永島田輝斗); 126 Yuto Nakamura (ja:中山優人)	131 Yuta Ibaragi (ja:茨木佑太); 132 Kosuke Nagashima (ja:長島幸佑); 133 Ryota Takeuchi (ja:武内涼太); 139 Chariel Radney (ja:チャリエル・ラドニー)	
Catchers	137 Konoshin Tomiyama (ja:富山紘之進)		
Infielders	120 Yūta Kaneda (ja:金田優太); 129 Rui Katsumata (ja:勝又琉偉)	130 Tsuyoshi Tanimura (ja:谷村剛); 134 Shinya Matsuishi (ja:松石信八)	
Outfielders	128 Ryo Sugiyama (ja:杉山諒); 135 Hikaru Kohno (ja:髙野光海)	136 Kazuki Fujita (ja:藤田和樹); 138 Stiven Acevedo (ja:スティベン・アセベド)	
Fukuoka SoftBank Hawks
Pitchers	120 Takehiro Hasegawa; 126 Yuwa Miyasato (ja:宮里優吾); 128 Shinichiro Kawano (ja:河野伸一朗); 132 Toya Kawaguchi (ja:川口冬弥); 134 Kenichi Murata (ja:村田賢一); 137 Kenshiro Tsukayama (ja:津嘉山憲志郎); 138 Yuta Aihara (ja:相原雄太); 139 Sanshiro Izaki (ja:井﨑燦志郎); 140 Koichiro Okada (ja:岡田皓一朗); 141 Ryotaro Sawayanagi (ja:澤柳亮太郎); 145 Hammond (ja:田中怜利ハモンド); 146 Ryusei Ohya	148 Takuma Yamasaki (ja:山崎琢磨); 149 Taiga Kumagai (ja:熊谷太雅); 152 Dan Shioji (ja:塩士暖); 155 Renta Nagasaki; 157 Sota Tanoue; 160 Keishin Nagamizu (ja:長水啓眞); 161 Kaito Uchino (ja:内野海斗); 162 Junpei Okaue (ja:岡植純平); 163 Akito Sasaki (ja:佐々木明都); 169 Yusei Tobita (ja:飛田悠成); 176 Dario Sarduy (ja:ダリオ・サルディ)	
Catchers	130 Sou Ohtomo (ja:大友宗); 125 Kota Makihara (ja:牧原巧汰)	133 Kanta Ikeda; 171 Ryota Morishima (ja:盛島稜大)	
Infielders	121 Zairen; 122 Keio Fujino (ja:藤野恵音); 124 Shuji Kuwahara (ja:桑原秀侍); 127 Yuki Hirose (ja:広瀬結煌); 129 Kyoshiro Sakura (ja:佐倉俠史朗); 131 Koki Nakazawa (ja:中澤恒貴)	144 Ayumu Ezaki (ja:江崎歩); 150 Reo Ohashi; 159 Kyogo Yamashita (ja:山下恭吾); 170 Ayuma Nishio (ja:西尾歩真); 174 Jonathan Moreno; 175 David Almonte	
Outfielders	123 Shuya Ohizumi (ja:大泉周也); 143 Koha Gyofu (ja:漁府輝羽); 147 Hayato Kinoshita; 151 Takahiro Suzuki; 154 Ikumi	158 Emil; 166 Kaito Shigematsu (ja:重松凱人); 168 Kota Satoh (ja:佐藤航太); 173 José Osuna (ホセ・オスーナ)	
Hokkaido Nippon-Ham Fighters
Pitchers	113 Yamato Katoh (加藤大和); 114 Ryodai Matsumoto (ja:松本遼大); 121 Sorato Kawakatsu (ja:川勝空人); 122 Junki Shibuya (ja:澁谷純希)	124 Towa Yokoyama; 140 Suguru Fukuda; 154 Kanato Anzai (ja:安西叶翔); 159 Haruka Nemoto	
Catcherss	120 Touki Hiwatari (ja:日渡騰輝)		
Infielders	111 Taiki Hamada (ja:濵田泰希)		
Outfielders	125 Taisei Fujita (ja:藤田大清); 127 Ataru Yamaguchi (ja:山口アタル)	168 Hinode Hoshino (ja:星野ひので)	
Orix Buffaloes
Pitchers	002 Matthew; 004 Issei Watanabe; 041 Hiroto Suga (ja:寿賀弘都); 044 Taketo Ashida (ja:芦田丈飛); 053 Taiga Uehara (ja:上原堆我)	056 Kento Inui (ja:乾健斗); 120 Atsuya Kogita; 121 Yuki Udagawa; 128 Yuito Mae (ja:前佑囲斗); 135 Kosuke Kawachi (ja:河内康介)	
Catchers	034 Kyoichiro Murakami (ja:村上喬一朗)	055 Kosuke Tajima	
Infielders	003 Souta Nakanishi; 045 Sota Kawano (ja:河野聡太); 051 Tomoki Imasaka (ja:今坂幸暉)	052 Musashi Shimizu (ja:清水武蔵); 122 Kosei Ohsato (ja:大里昂生); 126 Kazuya Katsuki (ja:香月一也)	
Outfielders	001 Haruto Mikata; 054 Seiichi Teramoto (ja:寺本聖一)	127 Kendai Gen (ja:元謙太)	
Saitama Seibu Lions
Pitchers	114 Towa Uema (ja:上間永遠); 115 Takeru Sasaki; 117 Taisei Miyazawa (ja:宮澤太成); 118 Keishin Saito (ja:斎藤佳紳); 120 Daiki Miura (三浦大輝); 124 Sohta Hamaoka (ja:濱岡蒼太); 125 Sinclair (シンクレア); 128 Hiroto Hiraguchi (ja:平口寛人); 129 Masahiro Kawashimo (ja:川下将勲)	131 Shota Kise (ja:木瀬翔太); 134 Yuma Masaki (ja:正木悠馬); 136 Rei Takahashi; 141 Musa; 142 Fred; 144 Jorge González; 145 Ronny Oliver; 146 Akshay More	
Catchers	113 Kaito Noda (ja:野田海人)	120 Daiju Nomura	
Infielders	111 Yuito Arai (ja:新井唯斗); 112 Takumu Imaoka (ja:今岡拓夢); 119 Teruki Koga (ja:古賀輝希); 126 Asahi Taniguchi (ja:谷口朝陽)	130 Koji Kaneko (ja:金子功児); 138 Haruma Fukuo (ja:福尾遥真); 140 Juan Corniel (ja:フアン・コルニエル); 141 Francisco Aponte	
Outfielders	116 Koichi Okumura (ja:奥村光一); 132 Ramal (ラマル); 135 Ginto Ando (ja:安藤銀杜)	137 Haruto Sawada (ja:澤田遥斗); 139 Okem (オケム); 143 Carlos	
Tohoku Rakuten Golden Eagles
Pitchers	029 Kazuto Tokuyama (ja:德山一翔); 061 Takuma Matsuda (ja:松田啄磨); 130 Yonawil Florimon	133 Takuma Nakazawa (ja:中沢匠磨); 197 Hsiao Chi (ja:蕭齊)	
Catchers	022 Kei Mizukami (ja:水上桂)	122 Taiga Shimahara (ja:島原大河)	
Infielders	132 Yuya Kishimoto (ja:岸本佑也)		
Outfielders	079 Ginji Maeda (ja:前田銀治); 126 Daita Horomura (ja:幌村黛汰)	129 Shion Ohtsubo (ja:大坪梓恩)	

== See also ==
- Nippon Professional Baseball
- List of current Nippon Professional Baseball team rosters
- Registration of players under control
- List of developmental players for the Nippon Professional Baseball (at Japanese-language Wikipedia)
