= Asia University (Japan) =

Private university in Tokyo, Japan

Coordinates: 35°42′20″N 139°32′03″E

- 亜細亜大学
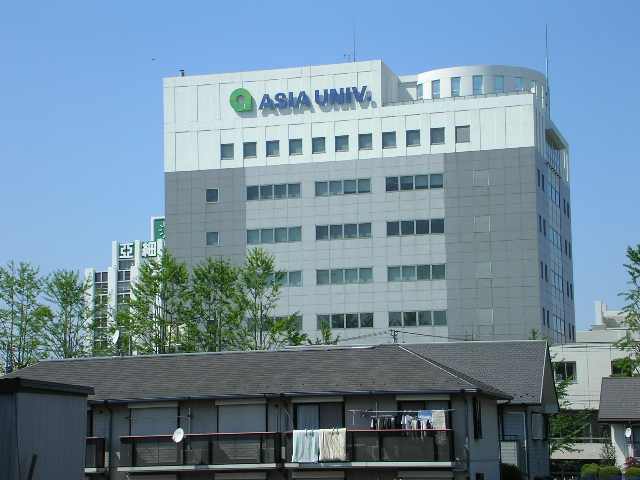
- Asia University
- Motto: 自助協力 (Self-help and Cooperation)
- Type: Private
- Established: 1941
- President: Kengo Nagatsuna
- Students: 7,006 (May 1, 2014)
- Undergraduates: 6,419
- Postgraduates: 100
- Location: 5-24-10 Sakai, Musashino-shi, Tokyo 180-8629, Japan, Musashino, Tokyo, Japan
- Campus: Suburban
- Website: www.asia-u.ac.jp/english/index.html

The Asia University of Japan (亜細亜大学, Ajia Daigaku) is a private university located in Musashino, Tokyo, Japan that offers courses in Business Administration, Economics, Law, International Relations, Sociology and Sports Science.

The university was founded in 1941 by Kozo Ota as Koa Senmon Gakko (Koa Professional School) on the site of the present Asia University campus. Ota believed that education should be based on a spiritual closeness between teachers and students. It was a unique school at the time, as it accommodated all students in dormitories divided by course of study; Continental Asia, Southern Pacific Islands and Japan ("Homeland").

It shares its name with another university located in Taiwan.

== Tohto University Baseball League ==
Asia University has performed consistently well in Division 1 of the Tohto University Baseball League, the intercollegiate baseball league that features 21 prominent universities in the Tokyo area.

== Faculties ==
- Faculty of Business
- Faculty of Economics
- Faculty of Law
- Faculty of International Relations
- Faculty of Sociology
- Faculty of Health and Sports Sciences

== Center for English Language Education ==
The Asia University (AU) Center for English Language Education (CELE) is a department at Asia University, located in Musashino, Tokyo, Japan. Serving the university since 1989, CELE was founded by former AU President Professor Shinkichi Eto. CELE employs between 25 and 30 native English speakers as full-time lecturers.

== Events ==
- Freshman Orientation Camp(Deai no Hiroba)
- Sports Festival
- Asia Festival(School Festival)

== Studying abroad ==
- AUAP (Asia University America Program)
- AUCP (Asia University China Program)
- AUEP (Asia University Exchange Program)
- AUGP (Asia University Global Program)

== Notable alumni and faculty ==
- Shudo Higashinakano: Historian and professor of intellectual history who argues that the Nanjing Massacre is a hoax.
- Becky: A popular television host, and occasional actress and singer.
- Aoi Nakamura: Actor
- Ai Kato: Actress
- Ayaka Nishiwaki: Member of technopop group Perfume.
- Risa Yoshiki: A glamour model, actress, celebrity, and enka singer.
- Hiromitsu Kitayama: Member of Johnny's Entertainment group Kis-My-Ft2
- Yoshihiko Kikuchi: A leader in the Church of Jesus Christ of Latter-day Saints
- Matsumura Hokuto: Member of Johnny's Entertainment group SixTONES
