= Registration of players under control =

Registration of players under control (支配下選手登録, shihaika senshu tōroku) is the process of notifying Nippon Professional Baseball (NPB) that a professional baseball team affiliated with the NPB has the exclusive right to sign a contract with a specific player as established under Article 52 of the Nippon Professional Baseball Agreement. A player whose unified contract documents have been approved and published by NPB is called a registered player under control (支配下登録選手, shihaika tōroku senshu) or a controlled player (支配下選手, shihaika senshu), and under Article 68 of the NPB Agreement, the team retains exclusive contract rights to the player until the player becomes a free agent.

== Summary ==
All players on each NPB team not considered developmental players are controlled players. Among controlled players, those on Nippon Professional Baseball rosters play in the first league's Central League and Pacific League, and other players play in the second league (NPB Agreement, Article 81). Players must fulfill their obligation to participate in official games held by NPB as well as unofficial games and training conducted by teams, the Nippon Professional Baseball All-Star Series, the Nippon Professional Baseball playoffs, and the Japan Series during the contract period.

== Regulations ==
- Each team can have up to 70 controlled players. (NPB Agreement Article 79)
- Player contracts are made through unified contract documents. (NPB Agreement Article 45)
- The team that signs the player contract must apply to the NPB commissioner for approval of the contract. (NPB Agreement Article 52–1)
- When the NPB Commissioner approves a player's contract, they must announce that they are controlled players. (NPB Agreement Article 52–3)
- Any player whose player contract has been unconditionally terminated or deemed terminated pursuant to the provisions of this Agreement, or who has forfeited or waived the right to be retained by the team during the suspension period, shall be free to enter into a player contract with any team after public announcement by the player and the Commissioner as a free agent player. (NPB Agreement Article 58)
- No new player contracts will be accepted from August 1 through the day following the end of the Climax Series. (NPB Agreement Article 64)
- If a trade is carried out between teams, the player registration under the control of the previous team will be deleted, and the player under control will be registered in the new team. The trade deadline is from the day after the end of the Climax Series to July 31 of the next season. (NPB Agreement Articles 105, 108, 110)
- The minimum annual salary for players under control is 4.2 million yen, but if a player with an annual salary of less than 16 million yen is registered as a player in the first squad, they can receive an amount that is multiplied by 1/150 of the difference and then multiplied by the number of days of registration. (NPB Agreement Article 89, 89–2)
- Controlled players that the team intends to sign for the next year will be announced by the NPB as contract pending players on December 2, and the team will have exclusive negotiating rights for contract renewals of the players. (NPB Agreement Articles 49, 66, 67, 68)

(Example: Tokyo Yakult Swallows List of players with pending contracts for FY2022.)

- Players who do not appear on the list of players with pending contracts will be publicly announced as free agent players by the NPB on December 2. (NPB Agreement Article 69)
- Contract for the next year, players who were controlled players in that year can apply for approval of the player from December 1 of that year, and other players can apply for the NPB Commissioner from the day after the Climax Series ends. (NPB Agreement Article 52–2)
