= Western League (Japanese baseball) =

Minor baseball league in Japan

- Classification: Ni gun (1952–present)
- Sport: Baseball
- Founded: 1952 (74 years ago)
- No. of teams: 6
- Country: Japan
- Most recent champion: Fukuoka SoftBank Hawks
- Most titles: Hanshin Tigers (18)
- Broadcaster: For the Fans
- Website: npb.jp/farm

The Western League (ウエスタン・リーグ, Uesutanrīgu) is one of the two minor leagues (マイナーリーグベースボール, Mainārīgubēsubōru) of Japanese professional baseball. The league is owned and managed by the Pacific League of Nippon Professional Baseball (NPB).

The league traces its roots to the Kansai Farm League, a formerly independent baseball league outside the realm of the NPB. It formerly included 7 teams, which quickly transformed into 6 due to the disbandment of once famous ballclub Sanyo Crowns. The first farm teams or second armies joined the league for the 1955 season.

A league champion is determined at the end of each season. The Hanshin Tigers have won 18 Western League titles, the most in the league's history, followed by the Chunichi Dragons (16) and the SoftBank Hawks (12).

== Structure and season ==
The league is currently based on a round robin system with at most 33 games against each other team in the league, which allows second teams to play a maximum of 132 games per year, including interleague games with the Eastern League. The number of scheduled games will vary from team to team, and games that are cancelled will not be replaced. The league championship is thus decided on winning percentage.

=== Interleague play ===
Interleague play exists. Interleague play is played in May during the Miyazaki Sunshine Series (宮崎サンシャインシリーズ). Plus, the WL champion meets the Eastern league's champion in the Farm Japan Championship Game, a single game to determine an overall champion of farm baseball, which has been held annually since 1987.

== Current teams ==
Team	City	Stadium
Chunichi Dragons	Nakagawa-ku, Nagoya	Nagoya Stadium
Orix Buffaloes	Konohana-ku, Osaka	Maishima Baseball Stadium
Hanshin Tigers	Amagasaki, Hyōgo	Nippon Steel SGL Stadium
Hiroshima Toyo Carp	Yū, Yamaguchi	Hiroshima Toyo Carp Yū Training Field
Fukuoka SoftBank Hawks	Chikugo, Fukuoka	HAWKS Baseball Park Chikugo
Kufu HAYATE Ventures Shizuoka	Shizuoka, Shizuoka	Shizuoka City Shimizu Ihara Stadium

== History ==
=== Kansai Farm League ===
The league was created in 1952 as the Kansai Farm League, and was initially completely separate from the workings of the Nippon Professional Baseball. It featured the minor league teams of the six professional teams that had their homefields in the western region of Japan, as well one independent team not affiliated with an NPB franchise.

The initial complement of teams:

- Hankyu Braves
- Hanshin Jaguars
- Nagoya Dragons
- Nankai Hawks
- Nishitetsu Lions
- Sanyo Crowns — independent
- Shochiku Robins

The Sanyo Crowns were dissolved after the 1952 season. The Shochiku Robins merged with the Taiyo Whales in 1953, but the Kintetsu Pearls' farm team joined the league that year, keeping the number of teams at six.

In 1954 the six teams of Nippon Professional Baseball's Central League decided to form their own minor league, called the New Japan League. With the Chunichi Dragons and Hanshin Tigers affiliates dropping out to join the new minor league, only four teams remained in the Kansai Farm League.

=== Formation of the Western League ===
Both minor league decided to join forces with NPB in 1955, and the 14 farm teams of the Central League and Pacific League were split up to create the Western League and Eastern League, each with seven teams.

1955 Western League lineup (minor league homefield shown in parentheses):

- Chunichi Dragons (Nagoya, Aichi)
- Hankyu Braves (Kobe, Hyōgo)
- Hanshin Jaguars (Nishinomiya, Hyōgo)
- Hiroshima Greens (Iwakuni, Yamaguchi)
- Kintetsu Pearls
- Nankai Hawks (Fukuoka, Fukuoka)
- Nishitetsu Lions

=== Shrinkage ===
The Lions moved their franchise to Saitama in 1979 to join the Eastern League, leaving six teams, and in 2005 the Orix BlueWave and Osaka Kintetsu Buffaloes merged to become the Orix Buffaloes, leaving five teams in the Western League.

=== Format History ===
Until 2002, teams played each other 18 times per year (9 home and 9 away) giving a 90-game season. In 2003 and 2004, the season was divided into two stages, with teams playing each other nine times in each stage. The two stage winners would then meet in a play-off game in October with the winners of the first stage hosting the game.

In 2005, the split-season system was abolished and teams played each other 22 times each (11 home, 11 away) giving an 88-game season. From 2011 to 2014, the number of games played has increased to 104 games (26 vs each opponent). From 2015, the number of games increased to a maximum of 132 per team with teams meeting up to 33 times per season.

League rankings include all games played - including interleague games against teams in the Eastern League, played during the Miyazaki Sunshine Series in May - with winning percentage determining positions as teams play different numbers of games (cancelled games are not rescheduled).

Prior to 2013 only games hosted by a team whose first team belongs to the Pacific League (Orix and SoftBank) included the designated hitter system (DH system). Since 2013 games hosted by Hanshin also used the DH system and Hiroshima followed suit in 2015. At present .

In principle, games can only run to 10 innings. However, in the case of a preliminary game held at the same venue as an official game of the first team, or in the case of a regional game held at a different venue the next day, extra innings are not played after two and a half or three hours (depending on the venue) from the start of the game. Even if the score is tied in the final inning or the home team wins the game after the top of the 9th inning, the bottom of the 9th will still be played. Even if time expires before the fifth inning is completed, the game shall always be played until the fifth inning.

In addition, a tournament has been held in May every year since 1961, in which all teams participate and the tournament is held at a neutral site (the 29th tournament in 1986 through the 40th tournament in 1997 were added to the official round-robin tournament).

Also, a few pro-am exchange tournaments are held during the season between teams that are not scheduled to play and teams from the Japan Baseball Federation.
