= Takahashi =

Takahashi (高橋; lit. "high bridge") is the third most common Japanese surname. Less common variants include 髙橋, 高梁, 孝橋, 鷹橋, 高槁, 高端, 鷹啄, 喬橋 and 鷹羽司.

== Notable people with the surname Takahashi ==
- Aaron Takahashi, Japanese-American actor
- Ai Takahashi (高橋 愛; born 1986), Japanese singer and actress
- Ai Takahashi (kickboxer) (高橋 藍; born 1982), Japanese kickboxer
- Aki Takahashi (高橋 アキ; born 1944), Japanese classical pianist
- Akiya Takahashi (高橋 明也; born 1953), Japanese art historian
- Akifumi Takahashi (高橋 聡文; born 1983), Japanese baseball player
- Ao Takahashi (高梁 碧; born 1979), Japanese voice actress
- Asuka Takahashi (髙橋 明日香; born 1999), Japanese badminton player
- Atsushi Takahashi (高橋 篤史; born 1965), Japanese astronomer
- Ayaka Takahashi (高橋 礼華; born 1990), Japanese badminton player
- Ayuo Takahashi (born 1960), Japanese-American musician
- Banmei Takahashi (高橋 伴明; born 1949), Japanese film director
- Belinda Takahashi (高橋 ベリンダ), professor and creator of the Juno Baby product line
- Bo Takahashi (born 1997), Japanese-Brazilian baseball player
- Bruna Takahashi (born 2000), Brazilian table tennis player
- Chiaki Takahashi (高橋 智秋; born 1977), Japanese voice actress
- Chiaki Takahashi (politician) (高橋 智秋; born 1956), Japanese politician
- Chiemi Takahashi (高橋 千恵美; born 1976), Japanese long-distance runner
- Chiyoko Takahashi (1912–1994), American lawyer
- Chizuko Takahashi (高橋 千鶴子; born 1959), Japanese politician
- Daigo Takahashi (髙橋 大悟; born 1999), Japanese footballer
- Daiji Takahashi (born 1977), Japanese mixed martial artist
- Daisuke Takahashi (髙橋 大輔; born 1986), Japanese figure skater
- Daisuke Takahashi (footballer) (高橋 大輔; born 1983), Japanese footballer
- Daisuke Takahashi (mathematician), Japanese mathematician
- Daito Takahashi (高橋 大斗; born 1980), Japanese Nordic combined skier
- Eiki Takahashi (高橋 英輝; born 1992), Japanese racewalker
- Erina Takahashi, Japanese-English ballerina
- Fumiya Takahashi (高橋文哉; born 2001), Japanese actor
- Ganari Takahashi (高橋 がなり; born 1958), Japanese businessman
- Genichi Takahashi (高橋 厳一; born 1980), Japanese footballer
- Genichiro Takahashi (高橋 源一郎; born 1951), Japanese writer
- Gentaro Takahashi (高橋 元太郎; born 1974), Japanese professional wrestler
- Hana Takahashi (高橋 はな; born 2000), Japanese women's footballer
- Harumi Takahashi (高橋 はるみ; born 1954), Japanese politician
- Harunori Takahashi (高橋 治則; died 2005), Japanese billionaire real estate developer
- Haruto Takahashi (髙橋 遥人; born 1995), Japanese baseball player
- Hideki Takahashi (高橋 英樹; born 1944), Japanese actor
- Hideko Takahashi, Japanese illustrator
- Hideto Takahashi (高橋 秀人; born 1987), Japanese footballer
- Hidetoki Takahashi (高橋 英辰; 1916–2000), Japanese footballer and manager
- Hidezo Takahashi (高橋 秀蔵; born 1934), Japanese cross-country skier
- Hikaru Takahashi (髙橋 ひかる; born 2001), Japanese actress and model
- Hiro Takahashi (高橋 ひろ; 1964–2005), Japanese singer-songwriter and composer
- Hiroaki Takahashi (高橋 宏明; born 1976), Japanese judoka
- Hiroatsu Takahashi (高橋 弘篤; born 1984), Japanese skeleton racer
- Hiroki Takahashi (高橋 広樹; born 1974), Japanese actor, voice actor and singer
- Hiroko Takahashi (cross-country skier) (高橋 弘子; born 1942), Japanese cross-country skier
- Hiroko Takahashi (高橋 裕子; born 1979), better known as Ao Takahashi, Japanese voice actress
- Hiroko Takahashi (高橋 浩子; 1969–2013), better known as Kaoru Shimamura, Japanese voice actress
- Hiromitsu Takahashi (高橋 宏光; born 1959), Japanese artist
- Hiromu Takahashi (高橋 広夢; born 1989), Japanese professional wrestler
- Hiroshi Takahashi (architect) (高橋 ヒロシ; born 1953), Japanese architect
- Hiroshi Takahashi (artist) (高橋 ヒロシ; born 1965), Japanese manga artist
- Hiroshi Takahashi (table tennis) (高橋 浩), Japanese table tennis player
- Hiroyuki Takahashi (game producer) (高橋 宏之; born 1957), Japanese video game producer and designer
- Hisako Takahashi (高橋 久子; 1927–2013), Japanese judge
- Hisanori Takahashi (高橋 尚成; born 1975), Japanese baseball player
- Hitomi Takahashi (actress) (高橋 ひとみ; born 1961), Japanese actress
- Hitomi Takahashi (singer) (高橋 瞳; born 1989), Japanese singer
- Ibō Takahashi (高橋 伊望; 1888–1947), Imperial Japanese Navy admiral
- Ikuro Takahashi (高橋 幾郎), Japanese drummer
- Ikuro Takahashi (botanist) (高橋 郁郎; 1892–1981), Japanese botanist
- Issei Takahashi (footballer) (髙橋 壱晟; born 1998), Japanese footballer
- Issey Takahashi (高橋 一生; born 1980), Japanese actor
- Joseph Takahashi (born 1951), Japanese-American neurobiologist and geneticist
- Jun Takahashi (高橋 盾; born 1969), Japanese fashion designer
- Junya Takahashi (高橋 潤哉; born 1997), Japanese footballer
- Juri Takahashi (高橋 朱里; born 1997), Japanese Singer and K-Pop idol from Rocket Punch
- Kakuichi Takahashi (高橋 赫一; 1906–1942), Imperial Japanese Navy officer
- Kaneko Takahashi (高橋 カネ子; born 1942), Japanese speed skater
- Kaori Takahashi (actress) (高橋 かおり; born 1975), Japanese actress
- Kaori Takahashi (synchronised swimmer) (高橋 馨; born 1974), Japanese synchronized swimmer
- Karin Takahashi (髙橋 果鈴; born 2000), Japanese actress and singer
- Karin Takahashi (voice actress) (高橋 花林; born 1994), Japanese voice actress
- Kasumi Takahashi (born 1980), Japanese-Australian rhythmic gymnast
- Katsuhiko Takahashi (高橋 克彦; born 1947), Japanese writer
- Katsunari Takahashi (高橋 勝成; born 1950), Japanese golfer
- Katsunori Takahashi (高橋 克典; born 1964), Japanese singer and actor
- Katsuro Takahashi (高橋 勝郎; 1939–1998), better known as Maedagawa, Japanese sumo wrestler
- Katsuya Takahashi, conspirator in the Sarin gas attack on the Tokyo subway
- Kazuaki Takahashi (高橋 一彰; born 1968), Japanese rugby union player
- Kazue Takahashi (高橋 和枝; 1929–1999), Japanese voice actress
- Kazuhiro Takahashi (sledge hockey) (高橋 和廣; born 1978), Japanese sledge hockey player
- Kazuki Takahashi (高橋 和希; 1961–2022), Japanese manga artist and game creator
- Kazumi Takahashi (高橋 和巳; 1931–1971), Japanese writer
- Kazumi Takahashi (baseball) (高橋 一三; 1946–2015), Japanese baseball player
- Kazuo Takahashi (高橋 和生; born 1969), Japanese mixed martial artist
- Kazuya Takahashi (高橋 和也; born 1969), Japanese actor
- Kei Takahashi (高橋 敬; born 1979), Japanese luger
- Keiji Takahashi (高橋 奎二; born 1997), Japanese baseball player
- Keiko Takahashi (高橋 惠子; born 1955), Japanese actress
- Keita Takahashi (高橋 慶太; born 1975), Japanese game designer and artist
- Keitarou Takahashi (高橋 慶太郎), Japanese manga artist
- Ken Takahashi (高橋 建; born 1969), Japanese baseball player
- Kenichi Takahashi (高橋 健一; born 1973), Japanese long-distance runner
- Kenichi Takahashi (basketball) (高橋 憲一; born 1980), Japanese basketball player
- Kenji Takahashi (footballer, born 1970) (高橋 健二), Japanese footballer
- Kenji Takahashi (footballer, born 1985) (髙橋 健史), Japanese footballer
- Kenji Takahashi (sailor) (高橋 賢次; born 1982), Japanese sailor
- Kensuke Takahashi (futsal player) (高橋 健介; born 1982), Japanese futsal player
- Kensuke Takahashi (actor) (高橋 健介; born 1994), Japanese actor
- Keihan Takahashi (高橋 慶帆; born 2003), Japanese male volleyball player
- Kentaro Takahashi (高橋 健太郎; born 1995), Japanese volleyball player
- Kiyomi Takahashi (高橋 清美; born 1966), Japanese swimmer
- Kiyoshi Takahashi (高橋 喜佳; born 2002), Japanese underground dancer
- Koichi Takahashi (高橋 幸一; 1950–1997), better known as Aobayama, Japanese sumo wrestler
- Kōji Takahashi (高橋 幸治; born 1935), Japanese actor
- Kona Takahashi (高橋 光成; born 1997), Japanese baseball player
- Kosaku Takahashi (高橋 耕作; born 1944), Japanese cyclist
- Kosuke Takahashi (高橋 浩祐; born 1968), Japanese journalist
- Takahashi Korekiyo (高橋 是清; 1854–1936), Japanese politician and Prime Minister of Japan
- Kouki Takahashi (高橋 江紀; 1987–2011), Japanese motorcycle racer
- Kōzō Takahashi (高橋 幸造; born 1982), Japanese volleyball player
- Kumiko Takahashi (animator) (高橋 久美子), Japanese animator and character designer
- Kumiko Takahashi (singer) (高橋 久美子; born 1954), Japanese singer
- Kumiko Takahashi (writer) (高橋 久美子; born 1982), Japanese writer
- Kuni Takahashi (高橋 邦典; born 1966), Japanese photojournalist
- Kuniaki Takahashi (高橋 邦明; born 1972), Japanese drifting driver
- Kunihiko Takahashi (高橋 邦彦; born 1969), Japanese pool player
- Kunimitsu Takahashi (高橋 国光; 1940–2022), Japanese motorcycle racer and racing driver
- Kuniyuki Takahashi, Japanese DJ and music producer
- Mai Takahashi (高橋 真唯; born 1984), Japanese actress and model
- Makoto Takahashi (voice actor) (高橋 信), Japanese voice actor
- Mamoru Takahashi (born 1956), Japanese golfer
- Manato Takahashi (高橋 真登), Japanese footballer
- Mariko Takahashi (gymnast) (高橋 麻理子; born 1988), Japanese gymnast
- Mariko Takahashi (model and actress) (高橋 マリ子; born 1984), Japanese model and actress
- Mariko Takahashi (singer) (高橋 真梨子; born 1949), Japanese singer
- Maryjun Takahashi (高橋 メアリージュン; born 1987), Japanese actress and model
- Masahiro Takahashi (高橋 昌大; born 1985), Japanese footballer
- Masanao Takahashi (高橋 正直; born 1982), Japanese equestrian
- Masanori Takahashi (高橋正則), commonly known as Kitaro
- Masao Takahashi (born 1929), Canadian judoka
- Masayo Takahashi (高橋 政代; born 1961), Japanese physician, ophthalmologist and stem cell researcher
- Matsuyoshi Takahashi (高橋 松吉; born 1955), Japanese cyclist
- Masayuki Takahashi (高橋 雅之; born 1962), Japanese sailor
- Michael Takahashi (高橋 マイケル; born 1974), Japanese-American basketball player
- Michiaki Takahashi (高橋 理明; 1928–2013), Japanese virologist
- Michio Takahashi (高橋 道雄; born 1960), Japanese shogi player
- Midori Takahashi (高橋 翠; born 1980), Japanese volleyball player
- Migaku Takahashi, Japanese engineer
- Miho Takahashi (高橋 美帆; born 1992), Japanese swimmer
- Mikako Takahashi (高橋 美佳子; born 1980), Japanese voice actor and singer
- Miki Takahashi (高橋 美紀), Japanese voice actress and singer
- Minami Takahashi (高橋 みなみ; born 1991), Japanese singer, idol and actress
- Minami Takahashi (voice actress) (高橋 未奈美; born 1990), Japanese voice actress
- Mitsuomi Takahashi (高橋 光臣; born 1982), Japanese actor
- Miyuki Takahashi (高橋 みゆき; born 1978), Japanese volleyball player
- Miyuki Takahashi (athlete) (高橋 美由紀; born 1946), Japanese pentathlete
- Momoko Takahashi (高橋 萌木子; born 1988), Japanese sprinter
- Morio Takahashi (高橋 守雄; 1883–1957), Japanese politician
- Takahashi Motokichi (高橋 元吉; 1893–1965), Japanese poet
- Motosuke Takahashi (高橋 資祐; 1941–2007), Japanese animator and anime director
- Takahashi no Mushimaro (高橋 虫麻呂), 8th-century Japanese poet
- Mutsumi Takahashi (高橋 睦心), Japanese-Canadian journalist
- Mutsuo Takahashi (高橋 睦郎; born 1937), Japanese poet and writer
- Nanae Takahashi (高橋 奈苗; born 1978), Japanese professional wrestler
- Naoki Takahashi (高橋 直樹; born 1976), Japanese footballer
- NaoKo TakaHashi (高橋 尚子; born 1973), Japanese artist
- Naoko Takahashi (高橋 尚子; born 1972), Japanese long-distance runner
- Naoya Takahashi (髙橋 直也; born 2001), Japanese footballer
- Naozumi Takahashi (高橋 直純; born 1971), Japanese singer and voice actor
- Natsuki Takahashi (高橋 夏樹), Japanese former actress
- Narumi Takahashi (高橋 成美; born 1992), Japanese figure skater
- Natsuko Takahashi (高橋ナツコ), Japanese screenwriter
- Niko Takahashi (born 2005), Japanese footballer
- Nobuko Takahashi (ambassador) Ambassador to Denmark
- Norio Takahashi (高橋 範夫; born 1971), Japanese footballer
- Takahashi Oden (高橋 お伝; 1848–1879), Japanese murderer
- Phil Takahashi (born 1957), Canadian judoka
- Ran Takahashi (髙橋 藍; born 2001), Japanese male volleyball player
- Ray Takahashi (born 1958), Canadian sport wrestler and judoka
- Rei Takahashi (高橋 礼; born 1995), Japanese baseball player
- Rie Takahashi (高橋 李依; born 1994), Japanese voice actress and singer
- Rieko Takahashi (高橋 理恵子; born 1967), Japanese actress and voice actress
- Rokuro Takahashi (高橋 六郎; 1909–?), Japanese rower
- Rumiko Takahashi (高橋 留美子; born 1957), Japanese manga artist
- Ryo Takahashi (footballer, born 1993) (高橋 諒), Japanese footballer
- Ryo Takahashi (footballer, born 2000) (高橋 亮), Japanese footballer
- Ryō Takahashi (musician) (高橋諒; born 1985), Japanese musician and composer
- Ryoichi Takahashi (高橋 良一; 1898–1963), Japanese entomologist
- Ryoko Takahashi (高橋 涼子; born 1973), Japanese biathlete
- Ryōsuke Takahashi (高橋 良輔; born 1943), Japanese anime director, screenwriter, and producer
- Ryota Takahashi (高橋 良太; born 1986), Japanese footballer
- Ryuki Takahashi (高橋 龍輝; born 1993), Japanese actor
- Ryuta Takahashi (髙橋 隆大; born 2004), Japanese footballer
- Sadamu Takahashi (高橋 定), Japanese naval aviator
- Saiko Takahashi (高橋 彩子; born 1976), Japanese women's footballer
- Sakae Takahashi, (1919–2001), Japanese American politician
- Sakae Takahashi (footballer) (高橋 栄), Japanese footballer
- Sakuye Takahashi (高橋 作衛; c. 1865 – 1920), Japanese international law scholar
- Sankichi Takahashi (高橋 三吉; 1882–1966), Imperial Japanese Navy admiral
- Saori Takahashi (高橋 沙織; born 1992), Japanese volleyball player
- Sayaka Takahashi (高橋 沙也加; born 1992), Japanese badminton player
- Satoshi Takahashi (born 1968), Japanese karateka
- Seiji Takahashi (高橋 聖二; born 1993), Japanese ice hockey player
- Seiji Takahashi (高橋 聖二; born 1985), Japanese Entrepreneur
- Shigehiro Takahashi (高橋 繁浩; born 1961), Japanese swimmer
- Shigeo Takahashi (高橋 成夫; 1912–1990), Japanese swimmer
- Shigeru Takahashi (高橋 茂), Japanese footballer
- Takahashi Shigetane (高橋 紹運; 1548–1586), Japanese samurai
- Shin Takahashi (高橋 しん; born 1967), Japanese manga artist
- Shinichiro Takahashi (高橋 真一郎; born 1957), Japanese footballer and manager
- Shinji Takahashi (baseball) (高橋 信二; born 1978), Japanese baseball player
- Shinji Takahashi (religious leader) (高橋 信次; 1927–1976), Japanese religious leader
- Shinji Takahashi (sport shooter) (高橋 信司; born 1937), Japanese sport shooter
- Shinji Takahashi (volleyball) (髙橋 慎治; born 1980), Japanese volleyball player
- Shinkichi Takahashi (高橋 新吉; 1901–1987), Japanese poet
- Shohei Takahashi (高橋 祥平; born 1991), Japanese footballer
- Shoko Takahashi (高橋 省子), Japanese table tennis player
- Shunki Takahashi (高橋 峻希; born 1990), Japanese footballer
- Takahashi Shōtei (高橋 松亭; 1871–1945), Japanese artist
- Shuhei Takahashi (高橋 周平; born 1994), Japanese baseball player
- Shunta Takahashi (高橋 駿太; born 1989), Japanese footballer
- Soya Takahashi (高橋 壮也; born 1996), Japanese footballer
- Subaru Takahashi (高橋 昴; 1902–1992), Japanese cross-country skier
- Susumu Takahashi (高橋 進; 1920–2001), Japanese middle-distance runner
- Tadayuki Takahashi (高橋 忠之; born 1956), Japanese ice dancer and coach
- Takako Takahashi (高橋 たか子; 1932–2013), Japanese writer
- Takanobu Takahashi (高橋 孝信; born 1951), Japanese academic and translator
- Takeo Takahashi (高橋 丈夫), Japanese anime director
- Takeo Takahashi (footballer) (高橋 武夫; born 1947), Japanese footballer and manager
- Taku Takahashi (高橋 拓; born 1974), Japanese musician and record producer
- Takumi Takahashi (高橋 巧; born 1989), Japanese motorcycle racer
- Takuya Takahashi (高橋 拓也; born 1989), Japanese footballer
- Tatsuhiko Takahashi (髙橋 竜彦; born 1974), Japanese golfer
- Tatsuo Takahashi (高橋 辰夫; 1928–2001), Japanese politician
- Tatsuya Takahashi (髙橋 龍也; born 1970), Japanese writer for anime
- Teiji Takahashi (高橋 貞二; 1926–1959), Japanese actor
- Teruo Takahashi (高橋 輝男; born 1941), Japanese wrestling referee and writer
- Tetsuya Takahashi (高橋 哲哉; born 1966), Japanese video game conceptor
- Tetsuya Takahashi (composer) (高橋 哲也), Japanese composer
- Tina Takahashi, Canadian judoka
- Tomoko Takahashi (born 1966), Japanese artist
- Tomomi Takahashi (baseball) (高橋 朋己; born 1988), Japanese baseball player
- Tomomi Takahashi (pole vaulter) (高橋 卓巳; born 1956), Japanese pole vaulter
- Tomotaka Takahashi (高橋 智隆; born 1975), Japanese roboticist
- Toru Takahashi (baseball) (高橋 徹; born 1987), Japanese baseball player
- Toru Takahashi (Internet) (高橋 徹; born 1941), Japanese computer network researcher and businessman
- Toru Takahashi (racing driver) (高橋 徹; 1960–1983), Japanese racing driver
- Toshiki Takahashi (footballer) (高橋 利樹; born 1998), Japanese footballer
- Toshio Takahashi (高橋 敏夫; born 1949), Japanese water polo player
- Tsutomu Takahashi (高橋 ツトム; born 1965), Japanese manga artist
- Wes Takahashi, American animator and visual effects supervisor
- Yashichiro Takahashi (高橋 弥七郎), Japanese writer
- Yasuhiko Takahashi (髙橋 靖彦; born 1985), Japanese wheel gymnastics acrobat
- Yasuko Takahashi, commonly known as Izumi Aki
- Yasushi Takahashi (高橋 康; 1924–2013), Japanese theoretical physicist
- Yōichi Takahashi (高橋 陽一; born 1960), Japanese manga artist
- Yōichirō Takahashi (高橋 陽一郎; born 1963), Japanese film and television director
- Yoko Takahashi (高橋 洋子; born 1966), Japanese singer
- Yoko Takahashi (fighter) (高橋 洋子; born 1973), Japanese mixed martial artist and kickboxer
- Yoshiaki Takahashi (高橋 良秋; born 1963), Japanese boxer
- Yoshie Takahashi (高橋 ヨシ江; born 1932), Japanese long jumper
- Yoshihiko Takahashi (高橋 慶彦; born 1957), Japanese baseball player
- Yoshihiro Takahashi (高橋 義廣; born 1953), Japanese manga artist
- Yoshiki Takahashi (footballer) (高橋 義希; born 1985), Japanese footballer
- Yoshiki Takahashi (高橋 義生), ring name of Kazuo Takahashi (born 1969), Japanese mixed martial artist
- Yoshinobu Takahashi (高橋 由伸; born 1975), Japanese baseball player
- Yōsuke Takahashi (高橋 葉介; born 1956), Japanese manga artist
- Yōsuke Takahashi (rugby union) (高橋 洋丞; born 1991), Japanese rugby union player
- Yu Takahashi (高橋 優; born 1983), Japanese singer-songwriter
- Yu Takahashi (actress) (高橋 ユウ; born 1991), Japanese actress and model
- Yugo Takahashi (高橋 裕吾), Japanese voice actor
- Takahashi Yuichi (高橋 由一; 1828–1894), Japanese painter
- Yuichi Takahashi (athlete) (高橋 勇市), Japanese Paralympic athlete
- Yūji Takahashi (高橋 悠治; born 1938), Japanese classical pianist, composer, critic and writer
- Yuji Takahashi (footballer) (高橋 祐治; born 1993), Japanese footballer
- Yujiro Takahashi (高橋 裕二郎; born 1981), Japanese professional wrestler
- Yuki Takahashi (高橋 裕紀; born 1984), Japanese motorcycle racer
- Yūki Takahashi (baseball) (髙橋 優貴; born 1997), Japanese baseball player
- Yuki Takahashi (wrestler) (高橋 侑希), Japanese sport wrestler
- Yukihiro Takahashi (高橋 幸宏; 1952–2023), Japanese musician
- Yukiko Takahashi (高橋 有紀子; born 1967), Japanese volleyball and beach volleyball player
- Yuko Takahashi (高橋 侑子), Japanese triathlete
- Yuma Takahashi (高橋 悠馬; born 1990), Japanese footballer
- Yumiko Takahashi (高橋 由美子; born 1974), Japanese actress and singer
- Yuriko Takahashi (高橋 百合子; born 1973), Japanese weightlifter
- Yusuke Takahashi (高橋 悠介; born 1997), Japanese tennis player
- Yutaka Takahashi (高橋 泰; born 1980), Japanese footballer
- Yutaka Takahasi (高橋 裕; born 1927), Japanese engineer
- Yutaro Takahashi (高橋 祐太郎; born 1987), Japanese footballer
- Yuuta Takahashi (高橋 優太; born 1984), Japanese actor
- Yuuta Takahashi (Magic: The Gathering player) (高橋 優太), Japanese Magic: The Gathering player

== Fictional characters ==
- Daichi Takahashi and Eriko Takahashi, from High School Girls
- Kenshi Takahashi, from the Mortal Kombat series
- Misaki Takahashi, from Junjo Romantica
- Mitsuko Takahashi, from Someday's Dreamers
- Tetsuya Takahashi, from Forbidden Dance
- Nanami Takahashi, from the manga We Were There
- Mr. Takahashi, from Curb Your Enthusiasm
- Takeda Takahashi, from Mortal Kombat X
- Takahashi from Fallout 4
- Keisuke Takahashi from Initial D
- Ryosuke Takahashi from Initial D
