= Takuya Kinoshita =

Japanese baseball player (born 1991)

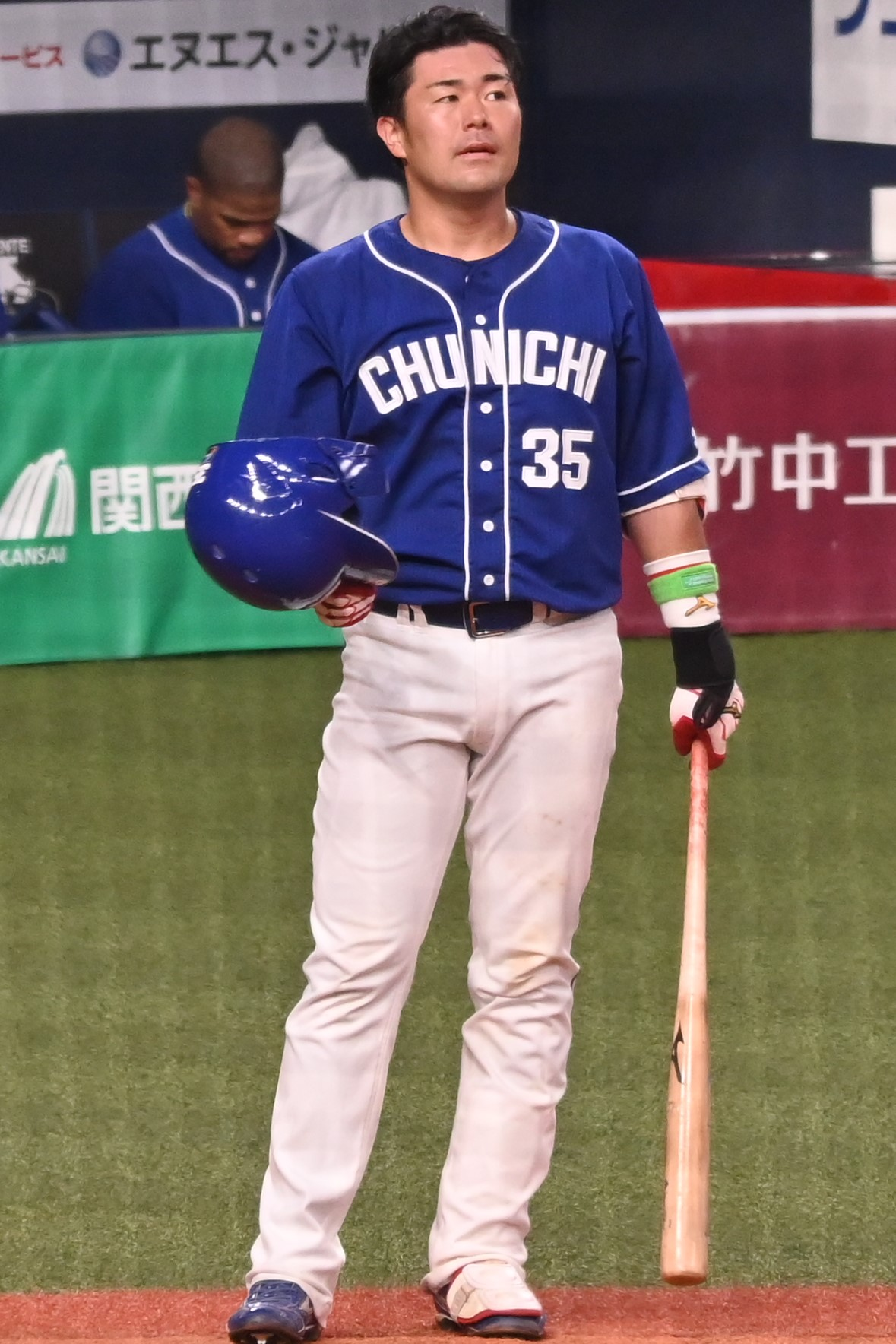

Chunichi Dragons – No. 35
- Catcher
- Born: December 18, 1991 (age 34); Kochi City, Kochi, Japan
- Bats: Right Throws: Right

debut
- 5 August, 2016, for the Chunichi Dragons

Career statistics (through July 26, 2026)
- Batting average: .247
- Home runs: 37
- RBI: 185
- Stats at Baseball Reference

Teams
- Chunichi Dragons (2016–present)

Career highlights and awards
- 2× NPB All-Star (2021, 2022); 2× The Best Battery Award with Pitcher Yudai Ohno (2020), Pitcher Yuya Yanagi (2021)

Takuya Kinoshita (木下 拓哉, Kinoshita Takuya; born December 18, 1991) is a Japanese professional baseball catcher for the Chunichi Dragons of Nippon Professional Baseball (NPB).

== Early career ==
In Spring of his second year at Kochi High School, Kinoshita solidified himself as starting catcher for the team and in his 2nd and 3rd year he appeared with the school at the summer koshien.

He attended Hosei University in Tokyo and in his third year was selected alongside future Chunichi Dragons team-mate Shota Sugiyama as catcher in the best 9 of the Autumn 2012 Tokyo Big6 Baseball League. While at Hosei University, he formed a battery with current Yokohama DeNA Baystars pitchers Kenta Ishida and Kazuki Mishima.

Upon graduation, Kinoshita was picked up by Toyota Motors where in his first year with the industrial league team, he helped them to victory in the 2014 All-Japan Amateur Baseball Tournament.

At the 2015 NPB Draft, he was selected as the third pick for the Chunichi Dragons and on 4 December 2015, signed a contract for ¥10,000,000 per year with a ¥65,000,000 sign-on bonus. Kinoshita was given the number 35 upon joining the Dragons.

== Professional career ==
=== Chunichi Dragons ===
==== 2016 ====
On 15 July, along with teammates Shun Ishikawa and Shota Tomonaga, he was selected for the Western League representative team for the 2016 Fresh All-Stars game in Okayama. He came in as a substitute catcher late in the game and was caught in center field in his only at-bat.

On 5 August, Kinoshita made his first appearance for the Dragons first team off the bench against the Yomiuri Giants in a 5-0 loss.

On 7 August, he made his first starting debut against the Yokohama DeNA Baystars in a combined rookie battery with number 1 2015 draft pick Shinnosuke Ogasawara; the first time in 18 years (the last being Kenshin Kawakami and Fumihiro Suzuki in 1998). Kinoshita then struck his first home-run in pro ball in his first at-bat of the game to give the Dragons a 1-0 lead.

==== 2017-2018 ====
Due to the poor form of 2016 regular catcher, Shōta Sugiyama, Kinoshita saw more time behind the plate, playing in 51 games however due to injuries, the rise of Masato Matsui and the addition of Shōta Ōno via free agency, limited his appearances to 9 in 2018.

==== 2019 ====
Under the new management of Tsuyoshi Yoda and catching staff Tsutomu Itō and Takeshi Nakamura, Kinoshita was on the starting day roster and rotated through much of the season alongside Takuma Katō and Ōno making 39 appearances in the first team.
