= Koichi Uehara =

Japanese professional golfer

Personal information
- Nationality: Japan
- Born: 25 November 1947 (age 78) Shizuoka Prefecture, Japan
- Height: 1.72 m (5 ft 8 in)
- Weight: 69 kg (152 lb; 10.9 st)

Career
- Sport: Golf
- Status: Professional
- Former tour: Japan Golf Tour
- Professional wins: 11

Number of wins by tour
- Japan Golf Tour: 7

Koichi Uehara (born 25 November 1947) is a Japanese professional golfer.

== Professional career ==
Uehara played on the Japan Golf Tour, winning seven times.

== Professional wins (11) ==
=== PGA of Japan Tour wins (7) ===
No.	Date	Tournament	Winning score	Margin of victory	Runner-up
1	28 Aug 1977	Hokkaido Open	E (73-68-74-73=288)		
2	27 Aug 1978	Hokkaido Open (2)	−2 (72-67-71-76=286)	7 strokes	(Japan) Yasuo Kuninaka
3	17 Sep 1978	Sanpo Classic	−14 (67-69-68-70=274)	4 strokes	(Japan) Haruo Yasuda
4	28 Sep 1980	Hokkaido Open (3)	+6 (71-76-72-75=294)	2 strokes	(Japan) Shoichi Sato
5	5 Sep 1982	Hokkaido Open (4)	+1 (71-72-76-70=289)	5 strokes	(Japan) Katsunari Takahashi
6	2 Sep 1984	Hokkaido Open (5)	−9 (70-70-68-71=279)		
7	7 Oct 1984	Japan Open Golf Championship	−5 (71-68-70-74=283)	2 strokes	(Japan) Koichi Suzuki

PGA of Japan Tour playoff record (0–1)

No.	Year	Tournament	Opponents	Result
1	1979	Japan Open Golf Championship	(Japan) Isao Aoki, (Taiwan) Kuo Chie-Hsiung, (Japan) Yoshitaka Yamamoto	Kuo won with birdie on fourth extra hole Aoki and Uehara eliminated by birdie on first hole

=== Other wins (4) ===
- 1976 Hokkaido Open
- 1979 Niigata Open
- 1993 Hokkaido Open
- 2000 Hokkaido Open

== See also ==
- List of male golfers
