= Shinnosuke Ogasawara =

Japanese baseball player (born 1997)

Shinnosuke Ogasawara 小笠原慎之介
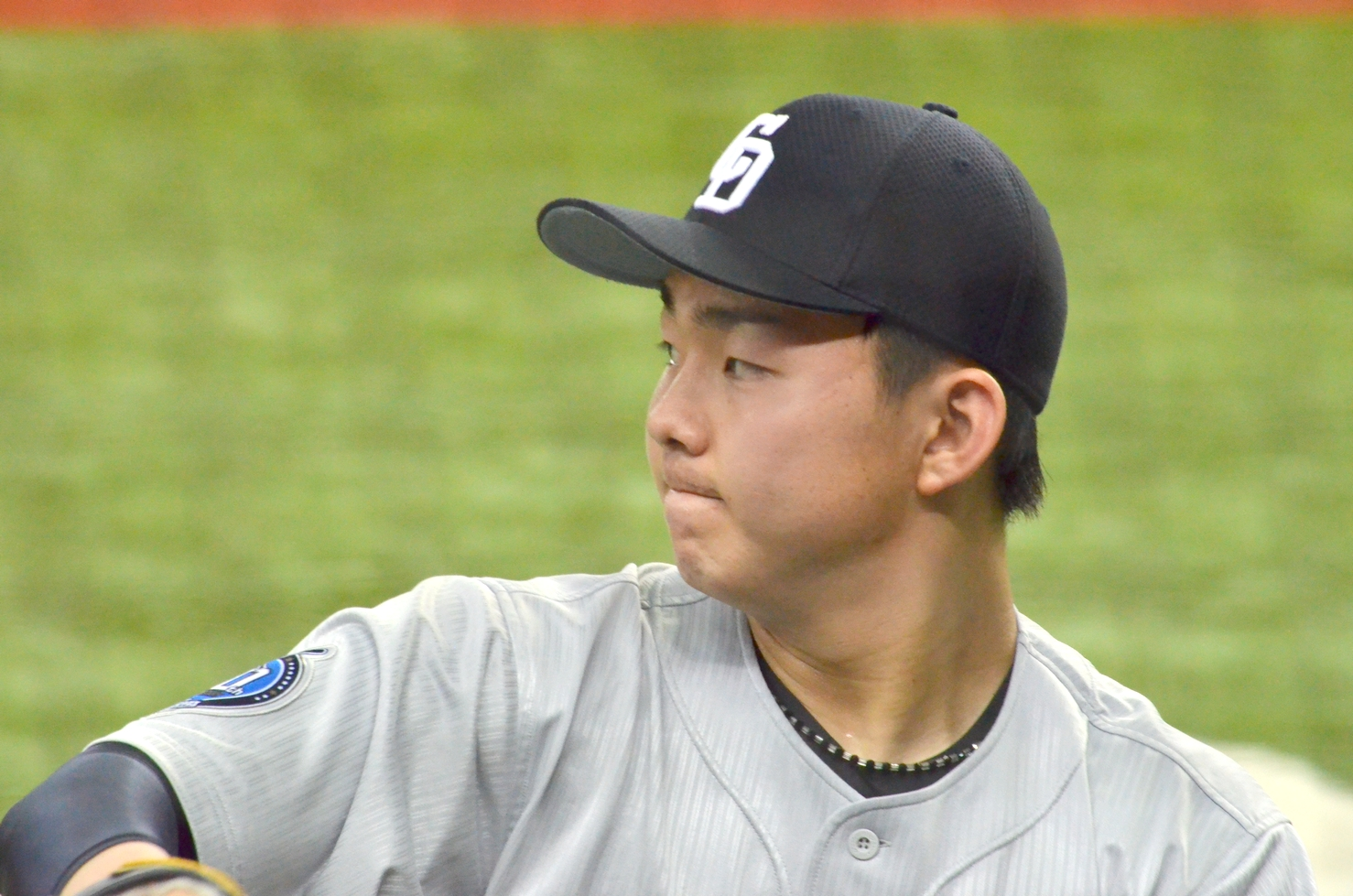
- Ogasawara with the Chunichi Dragons in 2016

Yomiuri Giants – No. 98
- Pitcher
- Born: October 8, 1997 (age 29); Fujisawa, Kanagawa, Japan
- Bats: Left Throws: Left

Professional debut
- NPB: May 31, 2016, for the Chunichi Dragons
- MLB: July 6, 2025, for the Washington Nationals

NPB statistics (through August 18, 2026)
- Win–loss record: 49–67
- Earned run average: 3.56
- Strikeouts: 788

MLB statistics (through 2025 season)
- Win–loss record: 1–1
- Earned run average: 6.98
- Strikeouts: 30
- Stats at Baseball Reference

Teams
- Chunichi Dragons (2016–2024); Washington Nationals (2025); Yomiuri Giants (2026–present)

Career highlights and awards
- NPB All-Star (2023)
Medals
Men's baseball
Representing Japan
U-18 Baseball World Cup
Silver medal – second place	2015 Osaka	Team

Shinnosuke Ogasawara (小笠原 慎之介, Ogasawara Shinnosuke; born October 8, 1997) is a Japanese professional baseball pitcher for the Yomiuri Giants of Nippon Professional Baseball (NPB). He has previously played in NPB for the Chunichi Dragons, and in Major League Baseball (MLB) for the Washington Nationals.

Ogasawara was the winning pitcher at the 2015 Summer Koshien tournament and was regarded as the second best high school pitching prospect in the 2015 NPB draft behind Gifu Commercial High School's Jumpei Takahashi. He holds the record for the worst start to a rookie season in the Japanese Central League going 0–5 in decisions before registering his first professional win.

He has represented Japan on the international stage at under-15 and under-18 level helping his country to a runner-up position in the 2015 U-18 Baseball World Cup.

== Early career ==
=== Junior high school ===
While studying at Zengyo Junior High School, Ogasawara played for the Shonan Boys where in his last year with team he helped them to win the annual Giants Cup. In the semi-final, he threw down 9 strikeouts in 7 innings for only 2 runs allowed and in the final threw 3 innings and 6Ks for one hit. His success in the tournament led to his selection in the Japan U-15 squad.

=== Tokai University Sagami Senior High School ===
Ogasawara rose to prominence as his school, Tokai University Sagami Senior High, won the 2015 Koshien tournament. He pitched a winning 161 ball game in the final against Sendai Ikuei Gakuen High School as well as hitting a solo home run in the 9th inning to clinch the title. In the tournament, Ogasawara pitched in 6 games, throwing down 26.1 innings, taking 23 strikeouts and conceding 9 earned runs with an ERA of 3.08.

=== Japan U-18 National Baseball Team ===
He took part in the 27th U-18 Baseball World Cup in 2015 where he helped the team to second place after being beaten in the final by the USA. Ogasawara finished the tournament with an untarnished 0.00 ERA. He pitched 6 innings against Australia taking 9 strikeouts allowing 3 hits while he pitched just two innings against Cuba in the semi-final with two strikeouts.

=== 2015 NPB Draft ===
At the 2015 NPB Draft, he was the contested first draft pick for the Chunichi Dragons and the Nippon Ham Fighters after both teams lost out on Jumpei Takahashi to the SoftBank Hawks. The Dragons would eventually prevail in acquiring the star high school pitcher, in a lottery with the Fighters, and won the right to negotiate a contract. Ogasawara was given a ¥100,000,000 signing on bonus plus ¥50,000,000 in incentives to go with a ¥15,000,000 yearly salary

He was given the number 11 which was previously worn by Chunichi ace, Kenshin Kawakami.

== Professional career ==
=== Chunichi Dragons ===
==== Rookie Year ====
On 31 May 2016, Ogasawara made his professional debut for the Dragons against the SoftBank Hawks as the first high school rookie to debut on the opening day of interleague play. Ogasawara started the game and pitched 5 innings including 4 strikeouts, 7 walks and one earned run. It would not however be a debut win as a late inning 4-run blow-out from closer Koji Fukutani gave the win to the Hawks. On 7 June, Ogasawara would be robbed once again of his maiden win this time against the Orix Buffaloes as Shinji Tajima gave up a run in the 9th inning to even the scores. Reliever Toshiya Okada would take the win after the game went to extra innings. On 16 June, Ogasawara would lose his first game as a pro after pitching 5 innings conceding 7 hits and 3 earned runs against the Chiba Lotte Marines resulting in his de-registering from the first team.

On 11 July, Ogasawara made an appearance in the 9th inning against the Yokohama DeNA Baystars at Yokohama Stadium in his first return to his home prefecture, Kanagawa, since being drafted. He would finish the game with a scoreless inning including a strikeout of Baystars slugger and 2016 NPB All-Star, Yoshitomo Tsutsugoh.

On 24 July at the Nagoya Dome, Ogasawara made his first starting appearance in Nagoya and the Central League against the Tokyo Yakult Swallows where he was the losing pitcher once more, allowing three runs on three hits and three walks in five innings, while striking out two.

On 7 August, in another game against the Yokohama DeNA Baystars, Ogasawara formed a combined rookie battery with number 3 2015 draft pick Takuya Kinoshita; the first time in 18 years for the Dragons (the last being Kenshin Kawakami and Fumihiro Suzuki in 1998).

On 20 August, against the Baystars, he pitched a season high 7 innings but was unable to claim his first win of the season after giving up Yoshitomo Tsutsugoh's 36th home run of the season in his first inning. It marked one of Ogasawara's best returns as a starter however as he used his curveball to good effect to claim 8 strikeouts only conceding 3 hits and two runs. The game would be his 5th straight loss marking it the worst debut season for a high school rookie pitcher in 55 years in the NPB and the worst ever in the Central League.

On 4 September, Ogasawara finally achieved his first win in his 12th match of the season against the Yomiuri Giants at the Tokyo Dome pitching 7 innings, taking 10 strikeouts and conceding three earned runs in a 5–3 win. He became the 7th Dragons high school rookie since Shinji Imanaka in 1989 to get a win in his first season. Ogasawara's following start against the Yakult Swallows at Meiji Jingu Stadium on 18 September would also result in a win where he threw down 6.2 scoreless innings with 6 strikeouts, 6 walks and 4 hits to help the Dragons climb off the bottom of the table.

Ogasawara finished his rookie season with a 2–6 record in decisions taking 58 strikeouts with an ERA of 3.36.

In Fall training however, after being pushed to throw over 200 pitches in one day, he suffered from cartilage damage in his left elbow and required surgery effectively ruling him out for the entirety of the off-season.

On 12 November, Ogasawara received a ¥3,000,000 pay increase moving to an annual salary of ¥18,000,000.

==== 2017-2018 ====
Ogasawara spent the beginning of the season tuning up on the farm following his injury in late 2016, but made his first appearance of the season on 6 May, in a single relief inning against the Yomiuri Giants. Ogasawara would go on to make his first start of the season on 9 May where he threw down 5 innings for 3-earned runs in a 3–1 loss to the Yokohama DeNA Baystars at Nagoya Dome.

Following his second win of the season against the Yomiuri Giants on 24 June, Ogasawara became the first teenage pitcher since Yutaka Enatsu in 1967 to have a 2–0 untarnished record against the Giants to start his career.

Ogasawara started the 2018 season as opening day pitcher. Issues with injury however limited Ogasawara's appearances over the year and on the 4 August, underwent surgery on his elbow, identical to the surgery he had received the year before. Ogaswara would not make any further appearances, ending the year pitching 107.1 innings at a 4.11 ERA. As a result, he received no pay raise at the end of the season.

=== Washington Nationals ===
On January 24, 2025, Ogasawara signed a two-year, $3.5 million contract with the Washington Nationals of Major League Baseball (MLB). He was optioned to the Triple-A Rochester Red Wings to begin the season, for whom he recorded a 4.80 ERA across three starts. On July 6, Ogasawara was promoted to the major leagues for the first time. He made his first MLB appearance that same day, pitching 2 2/3 innings in relief.

Ogasawara had his first MLB at bat on August 27, 2025 in a game against the New York Yankees, when catcher Drew Millas broke his finger and designated hitter Riley Adams had to take his place, leaving a batting position open. Ogasawara was already pitching in the game and interim manager Miguel Cairo decided to let Ogasawara bat for himself, a rare instance in MLB. Ogasawara struck out on three pitches against Yankees pitcher Max Fried. He made 23 appearances (two starts) for Washington during his rookie campaign, but struggled to a 6.98 ERA with 30 strikeouts. On October 29, Ogasawara was removed from the 40-man roster and sent outright to Triple-A Rochester.

In 2026, Ogasawara made 11 starts split between Rochester and the Double-A Harrisburg Senators, accumulating a 2–2 record and 2.91 ERA with 64 strikeouts across 58 2/3 innings pitched. He was released by the Nationals organization on June 15, 2026.

=== Yomiuri Giants ===
On June 18, 2026, Ogasawara signed with the Yomiuri Giants of Nippon Professional Baseball.

== Pitching style ==
Ogasawara throws 4 pitches with an overhand delivery – a fastball sitting around 90 mph (tops out at 95 mph), a 62 mph curveball, a slider and a change-up that released in a similar way to his fastball delivery.

Upon his debut, Ogasawara threw mostly only his fastball and his change-up in the strike zone however with further experience he started landing his curveball and slider in the zone taking more strikeouts in the process.

== Personal life ==
"Shinnosuke" is a name inherited from his grandfather.

He shares the same hometown as Dragons team-mate Shuhei Takahashi and the two attended the same elementary school and played at the same junior baseball side Shonan Boys. They played together in a local park as boys and their homes are said to be separated by about 10 minutes walk. When Shuhei turned professional with the Dragons, it was the then middle-school student Ogasawara that presented him with a celebratory bouquet.

He has spoken of his admiration for Masahiro Yamamoto (formerly of the Dragons) and Hiroki Kokubo, former Fukuoka SoftBank Hawks infielder and then manager of the Japan national baseball team. Ogasawara has also expressed respect for former New York Mets and San Francisco Giants outfielder Tsuyoshi Shinjo, hoping to emulate his career.

He is also a fan of pro wrestling and the WWE. Ogasawara admires Japanese wrestler, Tatsumi Fujinami.

Ogasawara also enjoys the Japanese idol girl group SKE48 and supports Jurina Matsui. He has been cheering her on since elementary school and knew of her since her featuring on AKB48's 2008 single Ōgoe Diamond. He mentions that "I thought she was really young and really gave her all." On 5 May 2017, when Ogasawara was with the first team, it was Matsui who performed the first pitch ceremony where the SKE48 performer admitted to following Ogasawara on Twitter and knowing of his fondness for pro-wrestling.
