= Eileen Spinelli =

American poet (born 1942)

Eileen Spinelli (née Mesi; born August 16, 1942) is an American author of children's books and poetry.

== Biography ==
She was born in Philadelphia, Pennsylvania. She wanted to be a writer from a young age. She grew up in Secane, Pennsylvania, and attended high school in Rose Valley, Pennsylvania. She won a poetry writing contest when she was in high school.

She began writing for children in 1979, when her own children were older and more independent. She writes both prose and in poetry. Most of her books are picture books, but she has also written novels for children.

Her husband is author Jerry Spinelli. They met while working for a magazine company: she in circulation; he as an editor. They have six children.

== Awards and reception ==
Somebody Loves You, Mr. Hatch received a Christopher Award.

Kirkus Reviews gave starred reviews to her books When You Are Happy, Heat Wave, In Our Backyard Garden, Sophie's Masterpiece, Three Pebbles and a Song, and Cold Snap. Cold Snap was also named one of the best children's books of 2012 by Kirkus Reviews. Here Comes the Year, Three Pebbles for a Song, The Dancing Pancake, Night Shift Daddy, When Mama Comes Home Tonight, and Song for the Whooping Crane received starred reviews from Publishers Weekly. When No One is Watching received a starred review from School Library Journal. Miss Fox's Class Goes Green received the Green Book Award in the picture book's category in 2010.

== Selected works ==
- Birdie (Eerdmans, 2019)
- Love You Always (WorthyKids/Ideals, 2017). Illustrated by Gillian Flint.
- Thankful (Zonderkidz, 2015). Illustrated by Archie Preston.
- God's Amazing World! (Ideals, 2014). Illustrated by Melanie Florian.
- Another Day as Emily (Knopf, 2014). Illustrated by Joanne Lew-Vriethoff.
- Nora's Ark (Zonderkidz, 2013). Illustrated by Nora Hilb.
- When No One Is Watching (Eerdmans, 2013). Illustrated by David Johnson.
- Cold Snap (Knopf, 2012). Illustrated by Marjorie Priceman.
- Jonah's Whale (Eerdmans, 2012). Illustrated by Giuliano Ferri.
- A Big Boy Now (Harper/HarperCollins, 2012). Illustrated by Megan Lloyd.
- The Perfect Christmas (Holt/Ottaviano). Illustrated by JoAnn Adinolfi.
- Now It Is Summer (Eerdmans, 2011). Illustrated by Mary Newell DePalma.
- Do You Have a Dog? (Eerdmans, 2011). Illustrated by Geraldo Valério.
- Do You Have a Cat? (Eerdmans, 2010). Illustrated by Geraldo Valério.
- The Dancing Pancake (Knopf, 2010). Illustrated by Joanne Lew-Vriethoff.
- Buzz (Simon & Schuster, 2010). Illustrated by Vincent Nguyen.
- Love My Shoes! (Ideals/CandyCane, 2011). Illustrated by Holli Conger.
- Today I Will: A Year of Quotes, Notes, and Promises to Myself (Knopf, 2009). With Jerry Spinelli.
- Princess Pig (Knopf, 2009). Illustrated by Tim Bowers.
- When Papa Comes Home Tonight (Simon & Schuster, 2009). Illustrated by David McPhail.
- Silly Tilly (Marshall Cavendish, 2009). Illustrated by David Slonim.
- Hug a Bug (HarperCollins, 2008). Illustrated by Dan Andreasen.
- The Best Story (Dial, 2008). Illustrated by Anne Wilsdorf.
- Callie Cat, Ice Skater (Whitman, 2007). Illustrated by Anne Kennedy.
- Heat Wave (Harcourt, 2007). Illustrated by Betsy Lewin.
- Where I Live (Dial, 2007). Illustrated by Matt Phelan.
- Summerhouse Time (Knopf, 2007). Illustrated by Joanne Lew-Vriethoff.
- Someday (Dial, 2007). Illustrated by Rosie Winstead.
- Polar Bear, Arctic Hare (Wordsong/Boyds Mills, 2007). Illustrated by Eugenie Fernandes.
- Hero Cat (Marshall Cavendish, 2006). Illustrated by Jo Ellen McAllister Stammen.
- When You Are Happy (Simon & Schuster, 2006). Illustrated by Geraldo Valério.
- The Best Time of Day (Gulliver/Harcourt, 2005). Illustrated by Bryan Langdo.
- City Angel (Dial, 2005). Illustrated by Krysten Brooker.
- Now It Is Winter (Eerdmans, 2004). Illustrated by Mary Newell DePalma.
- I Know It's Autumn (HarperCollins, 2004). Illustrated by Nancy Hayashi.
- Feathers: Poems about Birds (Henry Holt, 2004). Illustrated by Lisa McCue.
- While You Are Away (Hyperion, 2004). Illustrated by Renée Graef.
- Do You Have a Hat? (Simon & Schuster, 2004). Illustrated by Geraldo Valério
- In Our Backyard Garden (Simon & Schuster, 2004). Illustrated by Marcy Ramsey.
- Three Pebbles and a Song (Dial, 2003). Illustrated by S.D. Schindler.
- Something to Tell the Grandcows (Eerdmans, 2004). Illustrated by Bill Slavin.
- What Do Angels Wear? (HarperCollins, 2003). Illustrated by Emily Arnold McCully.
- The Perfect Thanksgiving (Henry Holt, 2003). Illustrated by JoAnn Adinolfi.
- Moe McTooth: An Alley Cat's Tale (Clarion, 2003). Illustrated by Linda Bronson.
- Bath Time (Marshall Cavendish). Illustrated by Janet Pederson.
- Rise the Moon (Dial, 2003). Illustrated by Raúl Colón.
- Horse in the Pigpen (HarperCollins, 2002). By Linda Williams and Spinelli; illustrated by Megan Lloyd.
- Wanda's Monster (Whitman, 2002). Illustrated by Nancy Hayashi.
- Kittycat Lullaby (Hyperion, 2001). Illustrated by Anne Mortimer.
- In My New Yellow Shirt (Henry Holt, 2001). Illustrated by Hideko Takahashi.
- Here Comes the Year (Henry Holt, 2001). Illustrated by Keiko Narahashi.
- Six Hogs on a Scooter (Orchard Books, 2000). Illustrated by Scott Nash.
- Night Shift Daddy (Hyperion, 2000). Illustrated by Melissa Iwai.
- Song for the Whooping Crane (Eerdmans, 2000). Illustrated by Elsa Warnick.
- Together at Christmas (Albert Whitman, 2012). Illustrated by Bin Lee.
- Where Is the Night Train Going? Bedtime Poems (Boyds Mills Press, 1996). Illustrated by Cyd Moore.
- Sophie's Masterpiece: A Spider's Tale (Simon & Schuster, 2001). Illustrated by Jane Dyer.
- Coming Through the Blizzard: A Christmas Story (Simon & Schuster Children's, 1999). Illustrated by Jenny Tylden-Wright.
- When Mama Comes Home Tonight (Simon & Schuster/Aladdin, 1998). Illustrated by Jane Dyer.
- If You Want to Find Golden (Whitman, 1993). Illustrated by Stacey Schuett.
- Boy, Can He Dance! (Four Winds/MacMillan, 1993). Illustrated by Paul Yalowitz.
- Somebody Loves You, Mr. Hatch (Simon & Schuster Children's, 1991). Illustrated by Paul Yalowitz.
- The Little Old Lady Who Was Not Afraid of Anything (Harper Trophy, 1988). By Linda Williams and Spinelli; illustrated by Megan Lloyd.
- Thanksgiving at the Tappletons' (HarperCollins, 1982) illustrated by Maryann Cocca-Leffler; reissue (HarperCollins, 2003) illustrated by Megan Lloyd.

=== As contributor ===
Lullaby and Kisses Sweet: Poems to Love With Your Baby (Abrams Appleseed, 2005). Edited by Lee Bennett Hopkins; illustrated by Alyssa Nassner.

=== Miss Fox's Class, illustrated by Anne Kennedy ===
- Miss Fox's Class Gets It Wrong (Whitman, 2012)
- Miss Fox's Class Earns a Field Trip (Whitman, 2010)
- Miss Fox's Class Goes Green (Whitman, 2009)
- Peace Week in Miss Fox's Class (Whitman, 2009)
- Miss Fox's Class Shapes Up (Whitman, 2001)

=== Lizzie Logan ===
- Lizzie Logan, Second Banana (Simon & Schuster, 1998)
- Lizzie Logan Gets Married (Simon & Schuster, 1997)
- Lizzie Logan Wears Purple Sunglasses (Simon & Schuster, 1995). Illustrated by Melanie Hope Greenberg.
