= Shōta Tomonaga =

Japanese baseball player (born 1991)

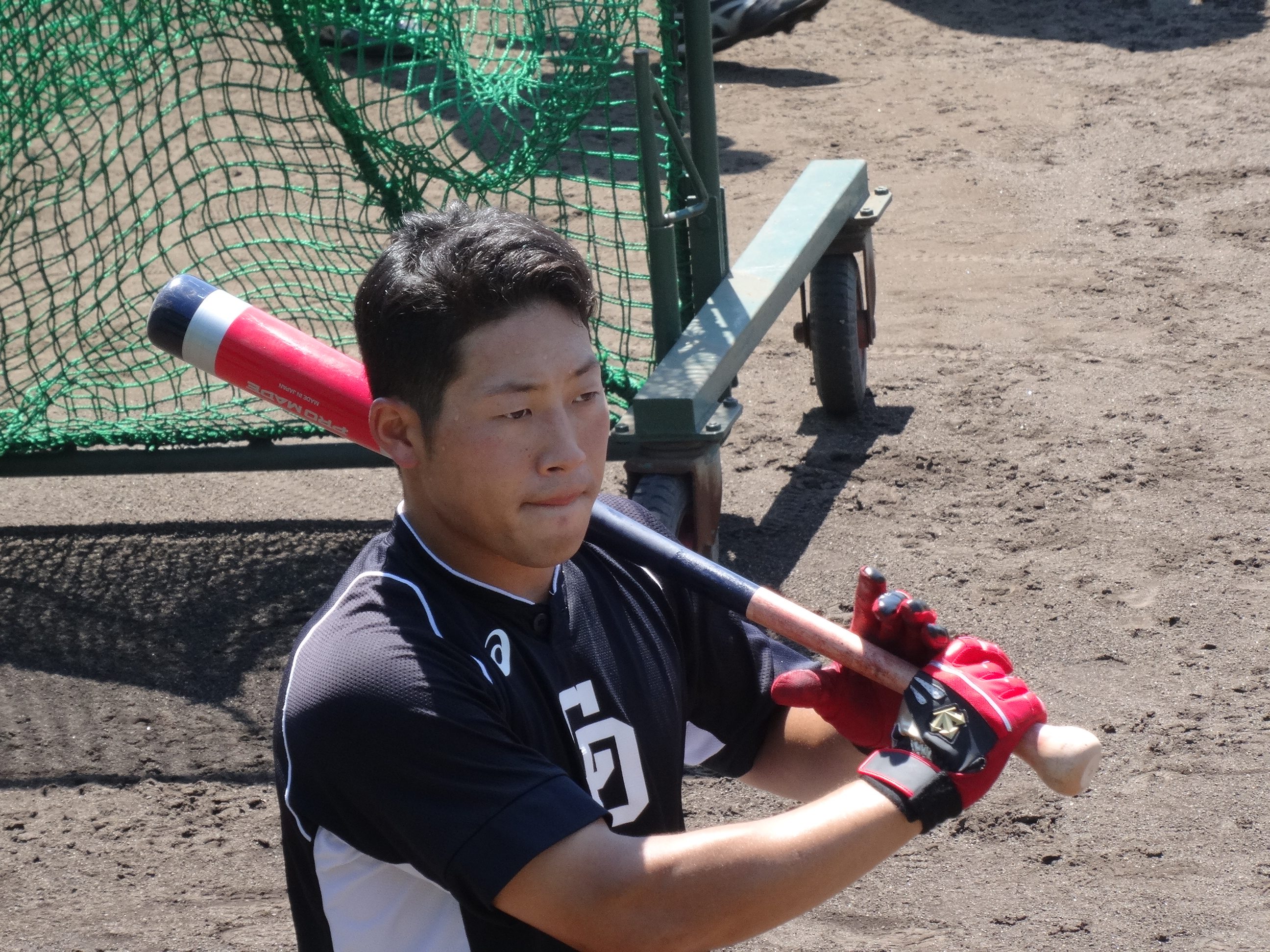
- Outfielder
- Born: April 1, 1991 (age 35); Hadano, Kanagawa, Japan
- Bats: Left Throws: Right

NPB debut
- April 4, 2015, for the Chunichi Dragons

NPB statistics (through 2016)
- Batting average: .111
- Home runs: 0
- RBI: 0
- Stats at Baseball Reference

Teams
- Chunichi Dragons (2015–2019)

Shōta Tomonaga (友永 翔太, Tomonaga Shōta; born April 1, 1991 in Hadano, Kanagawa, Japan) is a retired Japanese professional baseball outfielder. He played for the Chunichi Dragons of the Nippon Professional Baseball(NPB).

== Professional career ==
In the 2015 off-season he along with team mates Iori Katsura, Shuhei Takahashi, Tomohiro Hamada and Junki Kishimoto were loaned to the Taiwanese winter league

Along with teammates Shun Ishikawa and Takuya Kinoshita, Tomonaga was selected for the Western League representative team for the 2016 Fresh All-Stars game in Okayama. Tomonaga started in centre-field, batting 3rd in the line-up and recorded 1 hit in 4 at-bats.

On December 2, 2019, he became free agent.

== Career statistics ==
Nippon Professional Baseball
Year	Age	Team	G	AB	R	H	2B	3B	HR	TB	RBI	SB	AVG	OBP	SLG	OPS
2015	24	Chunichi	7	18	0	1	0	0	0	1	0	2	.056	.105	.056	.161
2016	25	Chunichi	12	10	2	0	0	0	0	2	0	0	.222	.222	.222	.444
**Career**			**19**	**27**	**2**	**3**	**0**	**0**	**0**	**3**	**0**	**2**	**.111**	**.143**	**.111**	**.254**

Bold indicates league leader; statistics current as of 29 September 2016
