= Junki Kishimoto =

Japanese baseball player (born 1996)

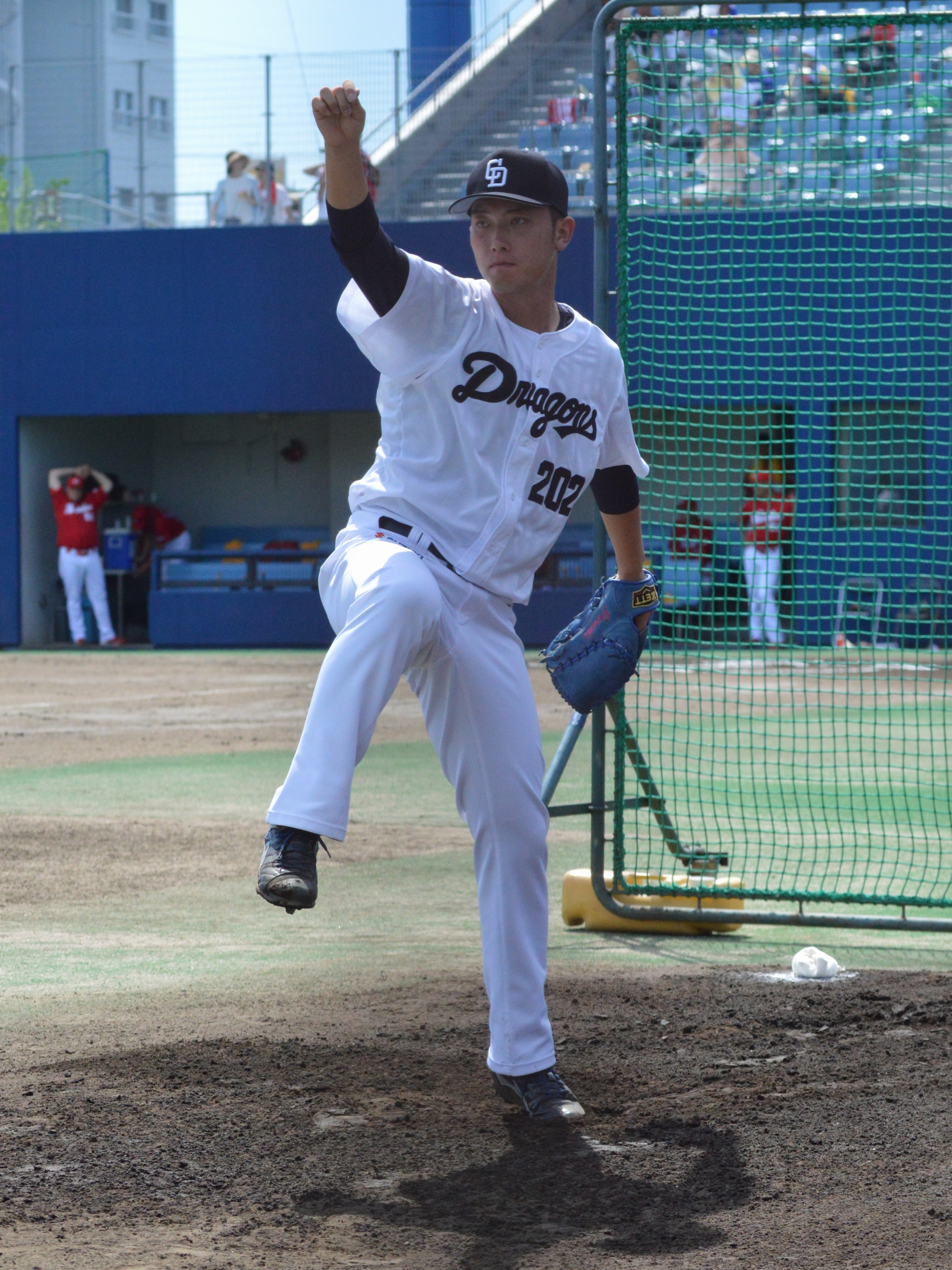

Kumamoto Golden Larks – No. 33
- Pitcher
- Born: February 19, 1996 (age 30); Sabae, Fukui, Japan
- Bats: Right Throws: Right
- Stats at Baseball Reference

Teams
- Chunichi Dragons (2014–2017)

Junki Kishimoto (岸本淳希, Kishimoto Junki; born February 19, 1996) is a Japanese baseball pitcher who is a free agent. He has previously played in Nippon Professional Baseball (NPB) for the Chunichi Dragons.

== Professional career ==
=== Chunichi Dragons ===
In the 2015 off-season, Kishimoto and his team mates, Iori Katsura, Shuhei Takahashi, Shota Tomonaga and Tomohiro Hamada were loaned to the Taiwanese winter league

On 29 March 2016, he was loaned to the Kagawa Olive Guyners in the Shikoku Island League Plus.

On 16 November 2016, Kishimoto was given a first team contract including a number change from 202 to 59.

After failing to reach the first team in 2017, Kishimoto was released by the Dragons and subsequently joined Hitachi Baseball Club in the industrial leagues to reignite his career.
