= Shūhei Takahashi =

Japanese baseball player (born 1994)

Shūhei Takahashi 高橋 周平
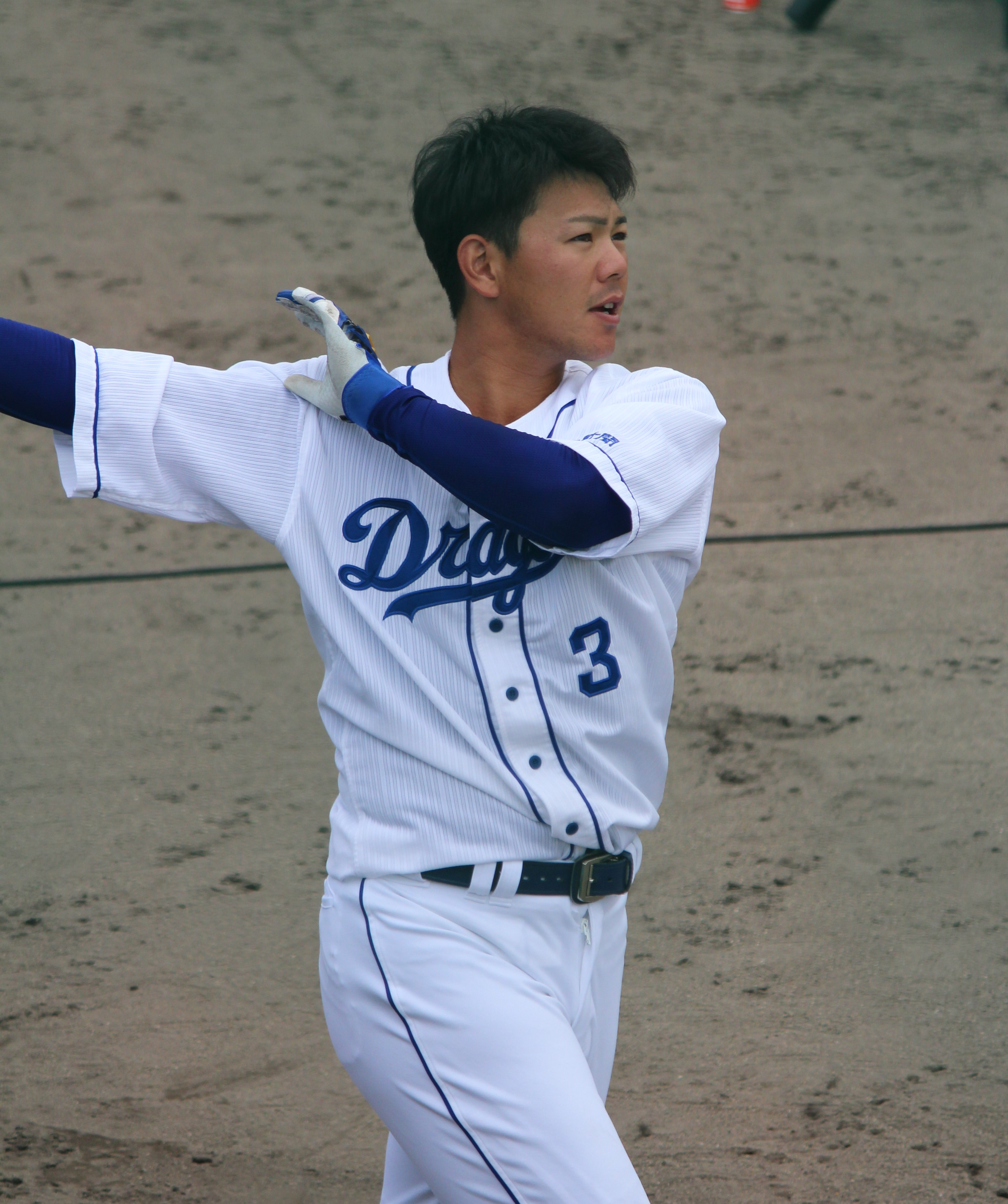
- Takahashi taking BP in Chatan, Okinawa, November 6, 2022

Chunichi Dragons – No. 3
- Infielder
- Born: January 18, 1994 (age 32); Fujisawa, Kanagawa, Japan
- Bats: Left Throws: Right

NPB debut
- March 31, 2012, for the Chunichi Dragons

NPB statistics (through July 26, 2026)
- Batting average: .258
- Home runs: 57
- Runs batted in: 378
- Stats at Baseball Reference

Teams
- Chunichi Dragons (2012–present)

Career highlights and awards
- 2x Golden Glove Award (2019-2020); 1x Best Nine (2019); 1x NPB All-Star (2019)

Shūhei Takahashi (高橋 周平, Takahashi Shūhei; born January 18, 1994 in Fujisawa, Kanagawa) is a Japanese professional baseball infielder for the Chunichi Dragons of Nippon Professional Baseball (NPB).

== Early career ==
Takahashi started playing baseball from grade 1 at Fujisawa Zengyo Elementary school as a pitcher. He started to play with local club, Shonan Boys from his Fujisawa Zengyo Middle School days and as a middle-school junior experienced the final of the Giants Cup in 2007. For high school, Takahashi had his sights set on playing for Yokohama High School but received an invitation to play for Tokai University Kofu High School by coach Junichi Izumi, which he accepted. Ryo Watanabe, currently of the Nippon Ham Fighters, played at the same school but was two years Takahashi's junior.

In spring of his first year of high school, he was deployed as a third-baseman and 4th in the batting line-up, becoming a regular for the team. From autumn, however, Takahashi was played as a short-stop. In spring of his second year in a practice game against Kashiwa Municipal High School, Takahashi recorded 2 grand slams in one inning. In spring of his third and final year, he contributed to victory in the prefectural tournament, hitting .471 along the way. In the final of the tournament, Takahashi recorded what would be a Yamanashi Prefecture record with his 57th home run. In the summer, his team bombed out of the Yamanashi Prefectural qualifying tournament for the Koshien, but was then selected for the Japanese representative team to play in the 2011 Asian Junior Baseball Championship. In 5 games and 20 at-bats, Takahashi smashed 10 base hits, registering 13 RBIs. In the final against the Republic of Korea, he would hit a 2-run homer that would make up his 71st home run as a high schooler, the 9th most in history for a high schooler, as well as claim tournament MVP honors.

In the 2011 NPB draft, Takahashi was the first pick for the Orix Buffaloes, Tokyo Yakult Swallows and the Chunichi Dragons where the Dragons won the rights to negotiate for the youngster's contract. He became the first high schooler in NPB draft history to have 3 teams select him as their first pick despite not having Koshien experience. On 25 November at a hotel within Yokohama city, Shūhei signed a provisional contract worth 12 million yen per year with a sign-on bonus of 100 million yen. This became the highest wage ever given to a high schooler in Chunichi history.

Takahashi was given the number 31, which was, up until 2009, worn by first-baseman Masahiko Morino.

== Professional career ==
=== Chunichi Dragons ===
==== 2012-2015 ====
On June 17, Shūhei hit his first pro home run, the winner, at the Kyocera Dome off the pitching of then Orix Buffaloes righty, Hayato Terahara. He became the youngest drafted high school hitter to achieve the feat at 18 years, 4 months old and the first high school rookie to hit a homer for the Dragons since Masahiko Morino in 1997 and 8th overall. It was also only the second time that a maiden homer by a high school rookie became the winning run, the last time being by Morimichi Takagi in 1960. He would also rake 7 home runs to claim home-run champion honours in the Western League.

In 2013, due to an injury to Dominican 3rd baseman, Hector Luna, Takahashi was given the chance to state his credentials in his preferred position for the last half of the season. On August 1 in a game against the Hanshin Tigers at Koshien Stadium, Takahashi became the youngest player in Chunichi history to hit a come from behind grand slam. In the off-season, Takahashi switched numbers with outfielder Kei Nomoto with the young infielder taking on the number 9.

With regular all-star short-stop Hirokazu Ibata leaving the team for the Yomiuri Giants at the end of the 2013 season and Luna and Morino set at 3rd and 1st base respectively, Takahashi was given a chance in the pre-season to solidify his spot as a regular at Ibata's former position. However, due to poor batting form, he did not make the opening day roster with Anderson Hernandez being preferred over him. Following that set-back, Takahashi was deployed in the Western league at either third base or short-stop, and, as with the previous year, made his return to the first team with an injury to Luna. On July 7, he was promoted to the first team to be the replacement third-baseman and on the July 14, hit his first home run of the season against the Yokohama DeNA BayStars while homering again against the Giants at Nagoya Dome on July 25. On August 12, Takahashi registered his 8th home run of the season at Gifu Prefectural Baseball Stadium with an out of the park home run.

Once again in the off-season, Shūhei had his number changed, this time to the famed number of Dragons legend, Kazuyoshi Tatsunami the number 3. (The number had been vacated by the departing Daiki Yoshikawa; Takahashi's 9 was given to the newly drafted Shun Ishikawa)

In 2015, Takahashi experienced a poor season with the bat, averaging only .208 and as such was dropped from the first team in July, not to return for the rest of the season. In the off-season he along with team mates Tomohiro Hamada, Iori Katsura, Shota Tomonaga and Junki Kishimoto were loaned to the Taiwanese winter league where Shūhei averaged .254 with 2 home runs.

==== Breaking-out and captaincy (2016-2019) ====
With the release of Hector Luna in the 2015 off-season, Shūhei was all but guaranteed third base and took his place in the starting day line-up, batting 7, against the Hanshin Tigers. After Ryosuke Hirata's injury early in the season, due to superb batting form, Shūhei was elevated to number 3 in the line-up. Up until the end of April, he was averaging .276 with 3 homers and 13 RBIs. However on April 30, Shūhei broke a bone in his wrist while playing against the Hiroshima Carp where he had to be substituted mid-game and as such was de-registered from the first team the following day.

On July 28, after spending time with the farm team recuperating, Takahashi made his return to the Dragons line-up against the Yokohama DeNA Baystars batting 6th in the line-up, fielding at third base. He contributed to the 15-2 victory with 2 hits and 4 RBIs to mark a tremendous return to the starting line-up against his hometown team.

2016 ended with Takahashi touching personal best totals for season at-bats, RBIs, hits and OBP.

Shūhei started the 2017 season on with the farm team, but was called up on 4 May quickly to replace Alex Guerrero at third-base against the Hiroshima Toyo Carp following the Cuban slugger's 2 errors the previous game. Shūhei batted 6th fielding at third base. On May 18 after achieving only 2 hits in 18 plate appearances and averaging .111, Shūhei was dropped from the first team.

With Nobumasa Fukuda entrenched at Takahashi's preferred position at third base, he was re-trained to play second base during spring camp. On May 31, against the Orix Buffaloes, Shūhei tied an NPB record with 4 doubles in consecutive plate appearances. Shūhei was able to be a mainstay throughout the season recording a personal best of 128 games played and for the first time passed the regulation number of at-bats to be considered for end of season awards. Shūhei also recorded double-digit homeruns for the first time in his career.

On January 16, it was announced that Takahashi would be the team captain for the 2019 season.

== Personal ==
Shūhei enjoys shopping and his favourite food is ramen.

Due to the influence of his older brother, he is a fan of Tsuyoshi Nagabuchi. His brother is a former member of the Tokai University Sagami High School baseball team.

Growing up, Takahashi was a keen admirer of Giants and New York Yankees legend, Hideki Matsui. When he was drafted by the Dragons, he made mention of his respect and admiration for his new team-mate, Masahiko Morino.

Since 2014 he has been sponsored by Adidas.

Shūhei shares the same hometown as teammate Shinnosuke Ogasawara and the two attended the same elementary school and played at the same junior baseball side Shonan Boys. They played together in a local park as boys and their homes are said to be separated by about 10 minutes walk. When Shuhei turned professional with the Dragons, it was the then middle-school student Ogasawara that presented him with a celebratory bouquet.

On January 4, 2017, it was announced that Takahashi had married local Aichi office worker, Yuri, following a 4-year relationship, with plans to hold a wedding ceremony at the end of the 2017 season.

On 27 November 2018, Shūhei became a father for the first time with the birth of a daughter.

== Career statistics ==
Nippon Professional Baseball
Year	Age	Team	G	AB	R	H	2B	3B	HR	TB	RBI	SB	AVG	OBP	SLG	OPS
2012	18	Chunichi	41	71	5	11	1	0	2	18	3	0	.155	.178	.254	.432
2013	19	Chunichi	66	197	19	49	13	1	5	79	27	0	.249	.290	.401	.691
2014	20	Chunichi	61	144	14	37	8	1	6	65	14	0	.257	.292	.451	.744
2015	21	Chunichi	51	154	10	32	6	1	4	52	18	2	.208	.287	.338	.624
2016	22	Chunichi	75	255	28	64	14	2	4	94	29	0	.251	.319	.369	.690
2017	23	Chunichi	41	129	12	30	6	0	2	42	10	0	.233	.306	.326	.632
2018	24	Chunichi	128	433	35	110	26	2	11	173	69	0	.254	.305	.400	.704
2019	25	Chunichi	117	430	50	126	28	5	7	185	59	3	.293	.345	.430	.776
**Career**			**580**	**1813**	**173**	**459**	**102**	**12**	**41**	**708**	**229**	**5**	**.253**	**.308**	**.390**	**.698**

Bold indicates league leader; statistics current as of 9 January 2020
