= Iori Katsura =

Japanese baseball player (born 1991)

Iori Katsura 桂依央利
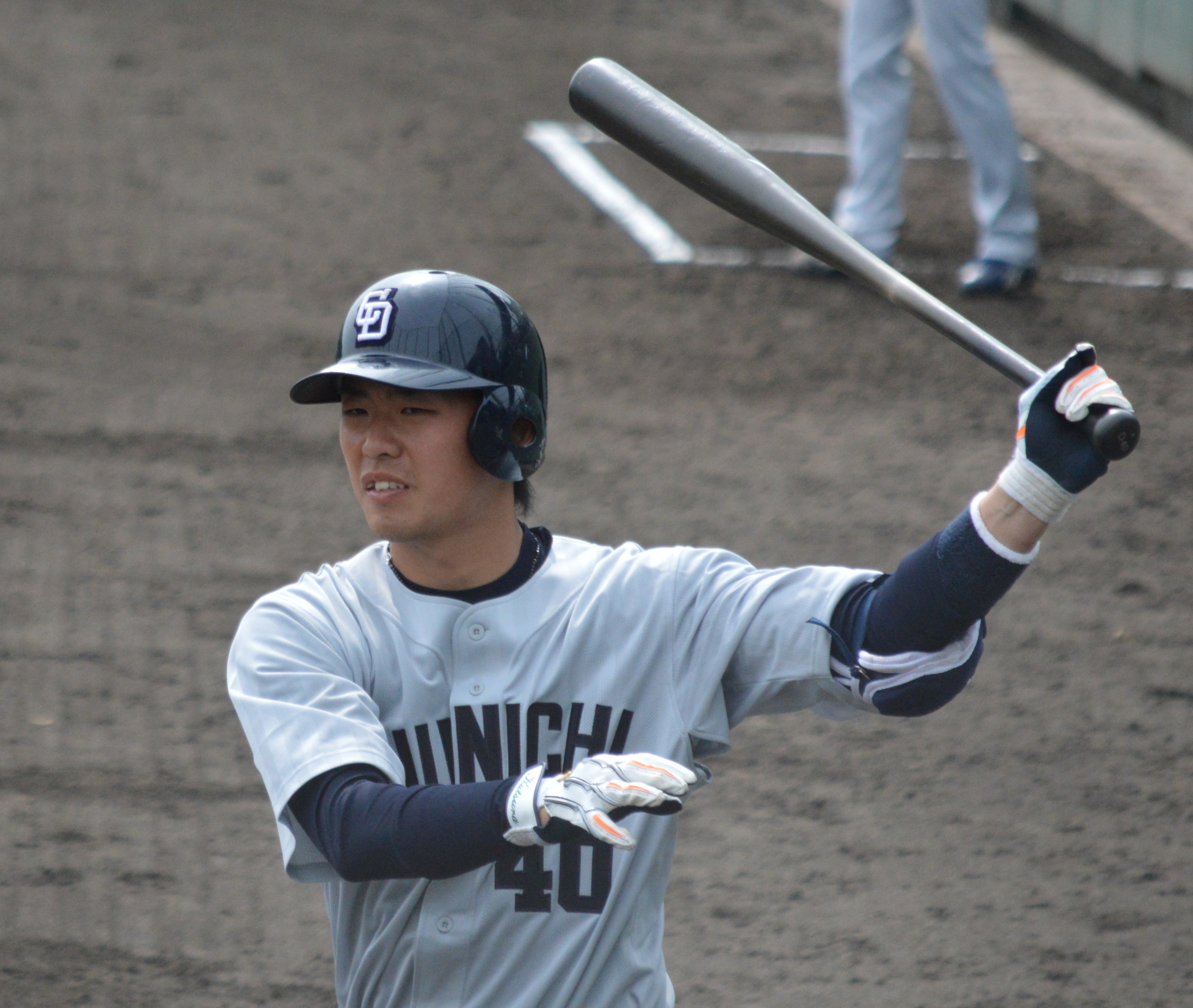
- Catcher
- Born: July 9, 1991 (age 34); Higashisumiyoshi-ku, Osaka, Japan
- Bats: Right Throws: Right

debut
- April 21, 2015, for the Chunichi Dragons

NPB statistics (through 2020 season)
- Batting average: .204
- Home runs: 5
- RBI: 20
- Stats at Baseball Reference

Teams
- Chunichi Dragons (2014–2022)

Iori Katsura (桂 依央利, Katsura Iori; born July 9, 1991) is a professional Japanese baseball catcher. He last played professionally for the Chunichi Dragons.

== Professional career ==
In the 2015 off-season he along with team mates Tomohiro Hamada, Shuhei Takahashi, Shota Tomonaga and Junki Kishimoto were loaned to the Taiwanese winter league
