= Tomohiro Hamada =

Japanese baseball player (born 1992)

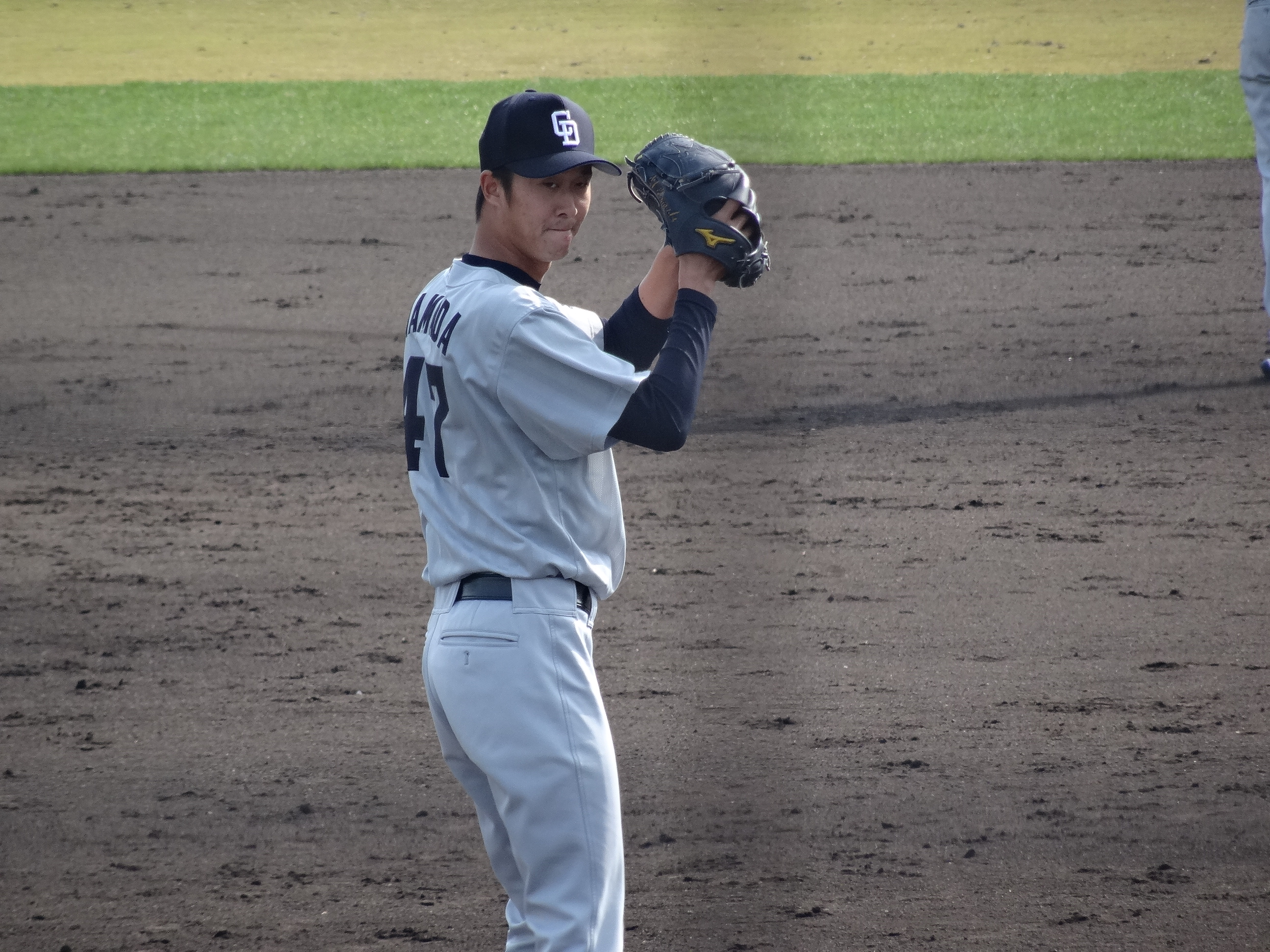
- Pitcher
- Born: October 1, 1992 (age 33); Miyazaki, Miyazaki, Japan
- Bats: Left Throws: Left

debut
- April 19, 2015, for the Chunichi Dragons

NPB statistics (through 2015)
- Win–loss record: 0 – 0
- ERA: 40.50
- Strikeouts: 2
- Stats at Baseball Reference

Teams
- Chunichi Dragons (2015–2020)

Tomohiro Hamada (浜田 智博, Hamada Tomohiro; born October 1, 1992 in Miyazaki, Miyazaki, Japan) is a professional Japanese baseball player. He most recently played pitcher for the Chunichi Dragons. He is currently a free agent.

== Early career ==
In Hamada's senior year with Miyazaki Technical High School, he reached the spring koshien. As the team's ace, he pitched a full game for only two hits in the first round against Maebashi Technical High School but came up short in the second round against Kohei Arihara's Koryo High school conceding a run in the final inning in a walk-off loss.

Following graduation he attended Kyushu Sangyo University and in fall of his junior year in a game against Kyushu Institute of Technology he recorded a no-hitter. In spring of his senior year, he guided his team to the best 4 of the Japan National Collegiate Baseball Championship and in the fall he appeared at the Meiji Jingu Baseball Tournament. He ended his university career with a 24–8 record in decisions.

On 23 October 2014, he was selected as the second draft pick for the Chunichi Dragons at the 2014 Nippon Professional Baseball draft where he was given the number 47 shirt.

== Professional career ==
=== Chunichi Dragons ===
==== 2015 ====
On the 10 April 2015, Hamada was registered for the first team and on 19 April made his first team debut against the Hiroshima Carp in the 8th inning where he gave up a career first home run to Takayoshi Noma followed by a succession of 5 hits resulting in 3 earned runs and leaving him in tears. This was the first time a rookie facing his first batter conceded a career first homerun to a fellow rookie. While there was much expectation over the development of Hamada, this would remain his only game of the season as he was relegated to the farm team for the remainder of the year. As a result of his and the team's poor performance, his contract was slashed by 25% to \7,500,000.

In the 2015 off-season he along with teammates Iori Katsura, Shuhei Takahashi, Shota Tomonaga and Junki Kishimoto were loaned to the Taiwanese winter league

==== 2016 ====
Hamada failed to make any appearances for the first team in the 2016 season with his contract being downgraded to a trainee contract for 2017.
