= Hokkaido Open =

The Hokkaido Open is a golf tournament which was on the Japan Golf Tour from 1977 to 1991. It was first played in 1967. It is played in September at a variety of courses in Hokkaidō.

== Winners ==
- 2025 Daiki Hasegawa
- 2024 Daiki Hasegawa
- 2023 Nanase Wada
- 2022 Dainoshin Kudo (amateur)
- 2021 Fumihiro Ebine
- 2020 No tournament due to COVID-19 pandemic
- 2019 Ryuichi Kondo
- 2018 Shunsuke Otani
- 2017 Masashi Okajima
- 2016 Shunsuke Otani
- 2015 Naruhito Ueda
- 2014 Hideki Kase
- 2013 Terumichi Kakazu
- 2012 Takeshi Sakiyama
- 2011 Eiji Mizoguchi
- 2010 Naruhito Ueda
- 2009 Katsunori Kuwabara
- 2008 Yuudai Maeda
- 2007 Tatsunari Nukata
- 2006 Kiyotaka Inoue
- 2005 Achi Sato
- 2004 Nobuhiro Masuda
- 2003 Nobuhiro Masuda
- 2002 Hisayuki Sasaki
- 2001 Hiromichi Kubo
- 2000 Koichi Uehara
- 1999 Naoya Okawa
- 1998 Shigehisa Goo
- 1997 Fumio Tanaka
- 1996 Toshinori Horiki
- 1995 Miyuki Omori
- 1994 Ken Oyama
- 1993 Koichi Uehara
- 1992 Kazuhiko Takami
- 1991 Katsunari Takahashi
- 1990 Katsunari Takahashi
- 1989 Mamoru Takahashi
- 1988 Mamoru Takahashi
- 1987 Akihiko Kojima
- 1986 Katsunari Takahashi
- 1985 Katsunari Takahashi
- 1984 Koichi Uehara
- 1983 Katsunari Takahashi
- 1982 Koichi Uehara
- 1981 Mitsuyoshi Goto
- 1980 Koichi Uehara
- 1979 Shoichi Sato
- 1978 Koichi Uehara
- 1977 Koichi Uehara
- 1976 Koichi Uehara
- 1975 Kanae Nobechi
- 1974 Kenji Takeda
- 1973 Masaaki Yamamoto
- 1972 Kenji Takeda
- 1971 Kanae Nobechi
- 1970 Jun Nobechi
- 1969 Kenji Takeda
- 1968 Shimizu Kubota
- 1967 Jun Nobechi
