= Megan Lloyd =

American illustrator of children's books

Megan Lloyd (born November 5, 1958) is an American illustrator of children's books. A book she illustrated, The Little Old Lady Who Was Not Afraid of Anything, was a Publishers Weekly seasonal bestseller for multiple years. Another book, Fancy That, received a starred review from Publishers Weekly.

Lloyd lives in Pennsylvania.

== Selected works ==
- Williams, Linda. The Little Old Lady Who Was Not Afraid of Anything. New York: HarperTrophy. 1988.
- Guiberson, Brenda Z. Cactus Hotel. Henry Holt and Company. 1991.
- Kimmel, Eric A. Baba Yaga: A Russian Folktale. Holiday House. 1991
- O'Connor, Jane, and Robert O'Connor. Super Cluck. HarperCollins. 1991
- Guiberson, Brenda Z. Spoonbill Swamp. Henry Holt. 1992.
- Guiberson, Brenda Z. Lobster Boat. Henry Holt and Company. 1993.
- Kindt McKenzie, Ellen. The Perfectly Orderly House. Henry Holt & Company. 1994.
- Birdseye, Tom. A Regular Flood of Mishap. Holiday House. 1994
- Esbensen, Barbara Juster. Dance with Me. New York: HarperCollins Children's Books. 1995.
- White, Linda. Too Many Pumpkins. Holiday House. 1996.
- Otto, Carolyn. What Color is Camouflage? HarperCollins. 1996.
- Jenkins, Priscilla Belz. Falcons Nest on Skyscrapers. HarperCollins. 1996.
- Kimmel, Eric A. Seven at One Blow. Holiday House. 1998.
- Berger, Melvin. Chirping Crickets. HarperCollins. 1998.
- Tews, Susan. The Gingerbread Doll. New York: Clarion Books. 2001.
- Williams, Linda. Horse in the Pigpen. New York: HarperCollins. 2002.
- Hershenhorn, Esther. Fancy That. New York: Holiday House. 2003. STARRED REVIEW
- Spinelli, Eileen. Thanksgiving at the Tappletons. New York: HarperTrophy. 2004. (reissue edition)
- Edwards, Pamela Duncan. The Mixed-Up Rooster. New York: Katherine Tegen Books. 2006.
- Miller, Bobbi. Davy Crockett Gets Hitched. Holiday House. 2009.
- White, Linda. Too Many Turkeys. Holiday House. 2010.
- White, Becky. Betsy Ross. Holiday House. 2011.
- Shore, Diane Z. This Is the Feast. New York: HarperCollins. 2008.
- Spinelli, Eileen. A Big Boy Now. New York: HarperCollins. 2012.
- Miller, Bobbi. Miss Sally Ann and the Panther. Holiday House. 2012
