= Shun Ishikawa =

Japanese baseball player (born 1990)

Shun Ishikawa 石川駿
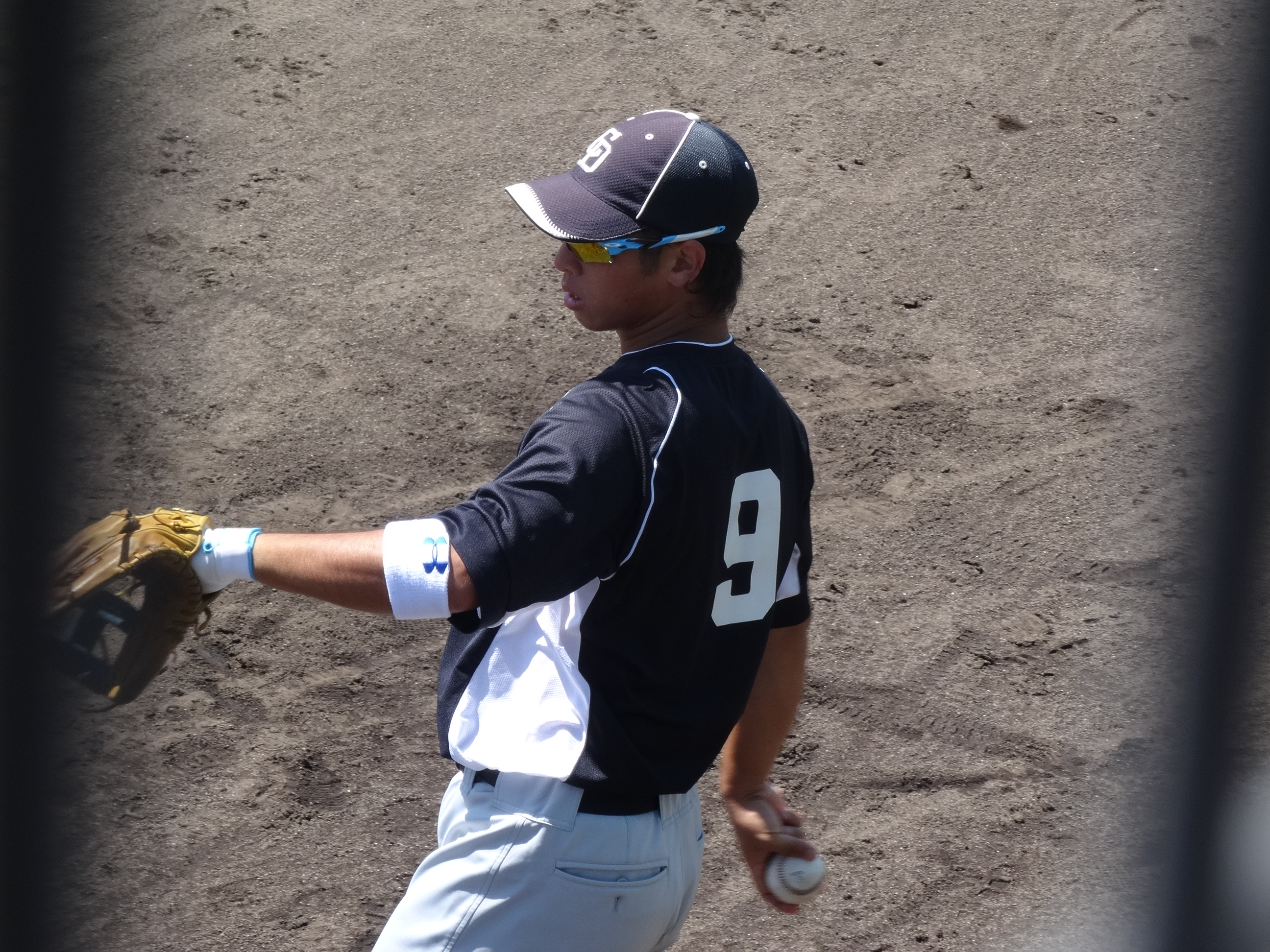
- Infielder
- Born: May 26, 1990 (age 36); Kusatsu, Shiga, Japan
- Batted: Right Threw: Right

NPB debut
- June 8, 2016, for the Chunichi Dragons

Last NPB appearance
- July 15, 2020, for the Chunichi Dragons

NPB statistics (through 2020 season)
- Batting average: .244
- Home runs: 1
- RBI: 6
- Stats at Baseball Reference

Teams
- Chunichi Dragons (2015–2020)

Shun Ishikawa (石川駿, born May 26, 1990, in Kusatsu, Shiga, Japan) is a Japanese former professional baseball infielder. He has played in Nippon Professional Baseball (NPB) for the Chunichi Dragons.

== Career ==
Chunichi Dragons selected Ishikawa with the forth selection in the 2014 NPB draft.

Along with teammates Takuya Kinoshita and Shota Tomonaga, he was selected for the Western League representative team for the 2016 Fresh All-Stars game in Okayama. Ishikawa started the game at first base, batting 6th and managed one hit in his 3 at-bats.

On November 3, 2020, Ishikawa announced his retirement.
