= Mamoru Takahashi =

Japanese professional golfer (born 1956)

Personal information
- Nationality: Japan
- Born: 11 April 1956 (age 70) Hokkaido, Japan
- Height: 1.80 m (5 ft 11 in)
- Weight: 80 kg (180 lb; 13 st)

Career
- Sport: Golf
- Status: Professional
- Former tour: Japan Golf Tour
- Professional wins: 2

Number of wins by tour
- Japan Golf Tour: 2

Mamoru Takahashi (born 11 April 1956) is a Japanese professional golfer.

== Professional career ==
Takahashi played on the Japan Golf Tour, winning twice.

== Professional wins (2) ==
=== PGA of Japan Tour wins (2) ===
| No. | Date | Tournament | Winning score | Margin of victory | Runner-up |
|---|---|---|---|---|---|
| 1 | 4 Sep 1988 | Hokkaido Open | −8 (72-70-71-67=280) | Playoff | (Japan) Katsunari Takahashi |
| 2 | 3 Sep 1989 | Hokkaido Open (2) | −3 (67-78-71-69=285) | Playoff | (Japan) Katsunari Takahashi |
