= Hideko Takahashi =

Japanese-American illustrator

Hideko Takahashi is a children's book illustrator. She was born in Osaka, Japan and educated in at Doshisha University in Kyoto, Japan. In 1990, she moved to Los Angeles to attend Otis College of Art and Design. Her work is included in Cooper Hewitt Museum. She did her a majority of schooling and education life in Kyoto, Japan, until later she moved to the U.S. in 1990 to attend Otis. After graduation, in 1994, she began to work as a freelance illustrator. Since then, she has made a professional career out of creating numerous illustrations for children's books, including: Beach Play, Good Night God Bless, Hot Dog on TV, Lull-a-bye Little One, The Ding Dong Clock, In My New Yellow Shirt, My Loose Tooth and Come to My Party and Other Shape Poems, Matthew's Truck and Princess Fun. Lynn Plourde, author of Snow Day, writes of Takahashi, "Hideko's illustrations have such kid-appeal and look deceptively simple (with basic colors and shapes), but they are filled with fun angles and perspectives and amazing details (cards look like real playing cards, and a braided rug is so textured you want to touch it)." In 2001, Takahashi moved to her adopted home of Seattle, which is now her favorite city.

== Education ==
Graduated from Doshisha University, Kyoto, Japan.

Graduated from Otis College of Art and Design, Los Angeles in 1994.

== Area of Interests ==
Hideko Takahashi has worked professionally as an illustrator for numerous children’s books, magazines, and educational materials. Her areas of interest include playful illustrations of children, dogs, and insects, which are among her favorite subjects. She has recalled enjoying drawing while watching television at home, an activity she continues to enjoy.

== Achievements ==
- Certificate of Merit 38th Annual Illustration West, Society of Illustrators of Los Angeles
- Bank Street College of Education’s Best Children’s Books of the Year 2001 for In My New Yellow Shirt
- Los Angeles Times Best Children’s Books, 2002 for Snow Day
- Chicago Public Library’s Best of the Best Books of 2004, Bank Street College of Education’s Best Children’s Books of the Year 2005 and Cooperative Children’s Book Center’s Choices 2005 for Come to My Party and Other Shaped Poems
- 2009 Kansas State Reading Circle Recommended Reading and Cooperative Children’s Book Center’s Choices 2008 for The Peace Bell

== Client List ==
- Candlewick Press
- Carus Publishing Company
- Childcraft
- Dial (Penguin, USA)
- G. P. Putnam’s Sons (Penguin, USA)
- Harcourt
- Henry Holt and Company
- Houghton Mifflin
- Japan-America Society of the State of Washington
- Kar-Ben Publishing
- Lee & Low Books
- MacMillan McGraw-Hill
- Mudpuppy
- New Harbinger Publications
- Nick Jr. Magazine
- Pig Toe Press
- Random House
- Rigby
- Running Press
- Scholastic
- Sesame Street Magazine
- Simon and Schuster
- Sterling Publishing
- Taiwan Wisdom Publishing

== Selected books ==
- Beach Play; by Marsha Hayles
- Good Night, God Bless; by Susan Heyboer O'Keefe
- Hot Dog on TV; by Karen T. Taha
- Lull-a-bye Little One; Dianne Ochiltree
- The Ding Dong Clock; by Carol H. Behrman
- In My New Yellow Shirt; by Eileen Spinelli
- My Loose Tooth; by Stephen Krensky
- Come to My Party and Other Shape Poems; by Heidi Roemer
