= Shōta Sugiyama =

Japanese baseball player (born 1991)

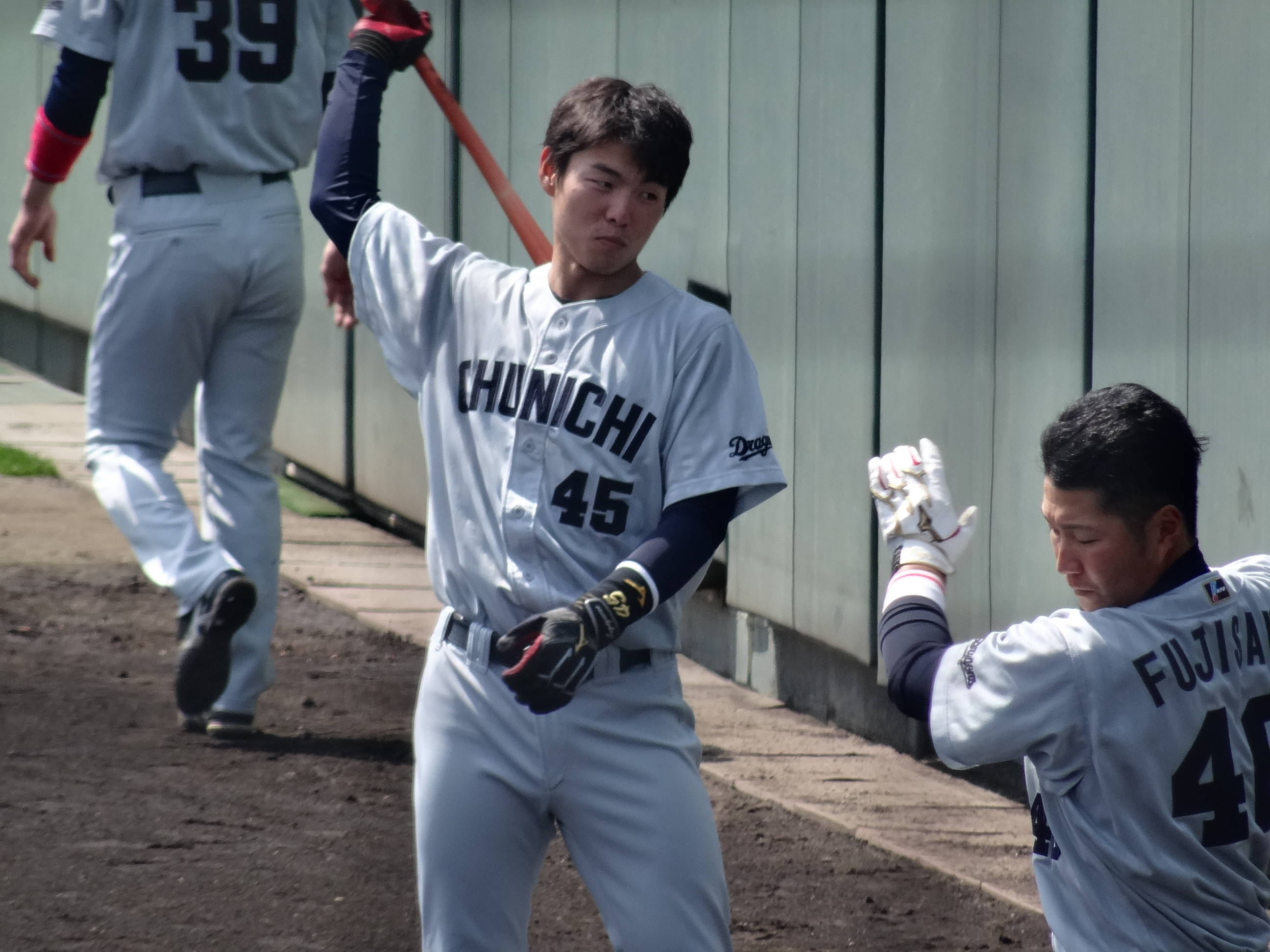
- Taken on March 22, 2015 at Hanshin Naruohama Stadium

Ryukyu Blue Oceans – No. 22
- Catcher
- Born: February 10, 1991 (age 35); Asahi, Chiba, Japan
- Bats: Right Throws: Right

debut
- May 20, 2015, for the Chunichi Dragons

NPB statistics (through 2016)
- Batting average: .232
- Home runs: 6
- RBIs: 44

Teams
- Chunichi Dragons (2013–2019)

Shōta Sugiyama (杉山 翔大, Sugiyama Shōta; born February 10, 1991 in Asahi, Chiba, Japan) is a professional Japanese baseball player. He last played catcher for the Chunichi Dragons.
