= Shoichi Sato =

Japanese golfer

Personal information
- Nationality: Japan
- Born: 6 December 1947 (age 78) Hokkaido Prefecture, Japan
- Height: 1.79 m (5 ft 10 in)
- Weight: 80 kg (180 lb; 13 st)

Career
- Sport: Golf
- Status: Professional
- Former tour: Japan Golf Tour
- Professional wins: 4

Number of wins by tour
- Japan Golf Tour: 2
- Other: 2

Shoichi Sato (佐藤 正一, Satō Shōichi; born 6 December 1947) is a Japanese professional golfer.

== Professional career ==
Sato played on the Japan Golf Tour, winning twice. Both wins came in 1979, in the Fujisankei Classic and the Hokkaido Open.

== Professional wins (4) ==
=== PGA of Japan Tour wins (2) ===
No.	Date	Tournament	Winning score	Margin of victory	Runner-up
1	13 May 1979	Fujisankei Classic	−5 (68-71-75-69=283)	1 stroke	(Japan) Isao Aoki
2	27 Aug 1979	Hokkaido Open	−9 (71-72-69-67=279)	5 strokes	(Japan) Hiroshi Yamada

=== Other wins (1) ===
- 1980 Tobu Pro-Am

=== Senior wins (1) ===
- 2015 Japan Professional Gold Senior Championship Golf Partner Cup
