= Migaku Takahashi =

Japanese engineer

Migaku Takahashi from Tohoku University, Sendai, Japan was named Fellow of the Institute of Electrical and Electronics Engineers (IEEE) in 2014 for contributions to thin film technology for high-density recording media and heads.
