= Fumihiro Suzuki =

Japanese baseball player and coach (born 1975)

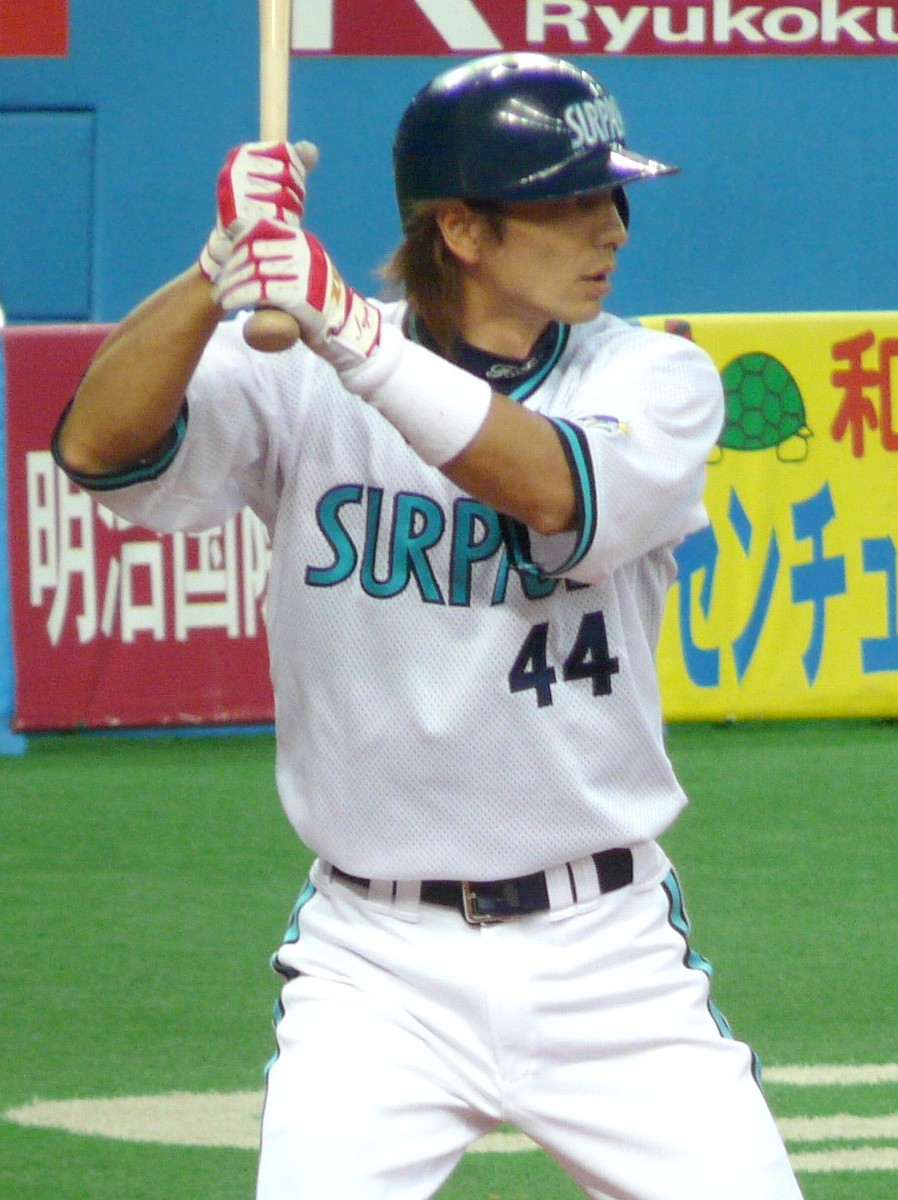
- Catcher/Coach
- Born: May 23, 1975 (age 50)
- Batted: Right Threw: Right

NPB debut
- October 9, 1998, for the Chunichi Dragons

Last NPB appearance
- September 17, 2012, for the Orix Buffaloes

NPB statistics
- Batting average: .185
- Home runs: 3
- RBI: 56
- Stats at Baseball Reference

Teams
- As player: Chunichi Dragons (1998–2002); Osaka Kintetsu Buffaloes (2003); Orix Buffaloes (2005–2012); As coach: Orix Buffaloes (2013–2020)

Fumihiro Suzuki (鈴木 郁洋, born May 23, 1975) is a retired Japanese professional baseball catcher and current coach for the Orix Buffaloes in Japan's Nippon Professional Baseball. He previously played with the Chunichi Dragons and the Osaka Kintetsu Buffaloes. Suzuki also played for Team Japan at the 2000 Olympics.
