= Katsunari Takahashi =

Japanese professional golfer (born 1950)

Katsunari Takahashi 高橋勝成
Personal information
- Nationality: Japan
- Born: 5 August 1950 (age 76) Hokkaidō, Japan
- Height: 1.76 m (5 ft 9 in)
- Weight: 80 kg (180 lb; 13 st)

Career
- Sport: Golf
- Turned professional: 1975
- Former tour: Japan Golf Tour
- Professional wins: 30

Number of wins by tour
- Japan Golf Tour: 10
- Other: 20

Katsunari Takahashi (高橋勝成, Takahashi Katsunari) (born Go Seung-Seong (高勝成, 고승성) 5 August 1950) is a Japanese professional golfer of Korean ancestry.

== Career ==
Takahashi was born in Asahikawa, Hokkaidō. He won 10 tournaments on the Japan Golf Tour.

== Professional wins (30) ==
=== PGA of Japan Tour wins (10) ===
| No. | Date | Tournament | Winning score | Margin of victory | Runner-up |
|---|---|---|---|---|---|
| 1 | 4 Sep 1983 | Hokkaido Open | −7 (68-71-74-68=281) | 7 strokes | (Japan) Toshiaki Nakamura |
| 2 | 25 Sep 1983 | Hiroshima Open | −15 (67-68-66-72=273) | Playoff | (Japan) Tateo Ozaki |
| 3 | 19 May 1985 | Japan PGA Match-Play Championship | 2 and 1 | | (Japan) Akira Yabe |
| 4 | 30 Jun 1985 | Mizuno Open | −11 (67-71-67=205) (Note: Shortened to 54 holes due to weather.) | Shared title with (Japan) Tateo Ozaki | |
| 5 | 8 Sep 1985 | Hokkaido Open (2) | −6 (71-69-74-68=282) | 8 strokes | (Japan) Mamoru Takahashi |
| 6 | 7 Sep 1986 | Hokkaido Open (3) | −12 (72-69-65-70=276) | 7 strokes | (Japan) Kazuhiro Takami |
| 7 | 17 May 1987 | Japan PGA Match-Play Championship Unisys Cup (2) | 37 holes | | (Japan) Masashi Ozaki |
| 8 | 30 Oct 1988 | ABC Lark Cup | −11 (65-66-72-74=277) | 1 stroke | (Japan) Masashi Ozaki |
| 9 | 2 Sep 1990 | Hokkaido Open (4) | −10 (69-68-73-68=278) | 5 strokes | (Japan) Mamoru Takahashi |
| 10 | 8 Sep 1991 | Hokkaido Open (5) | −7 (69-66-76-70=281) | 3 strokes | (Japan) Fumio Tanaka |

PGA of Japan Tour playoff record (1–5)

| No. | Year | Tournament | Opponent(s) | Result |
|---|---|---|---|---|
| 1 | 1981 | Gunmaken Open | (Japan) Satsuki Takahashi | |
| 2 | 1983 | Niigata Open | (Japan) Isao Aoki, (Japan) Hideto Shigenobu | Shigenobu won with par on first extra hole |
| 3 | 1983 | Hiroshima Open | (Japan) Tateo Ozaki | Won with par on third extra hole |
| 4 | 1988 | Hokkaido Open | (Japan) Mamoru Takahashi | |
| 4 | 1989 | Hokkaido Open | (Japan) Mamoru Takahashi | |
| 5 | 1995 | PGA Philanthropy Tournament | (Japan) Kazuhiro Takami, (United States) Brian Watts | Takami won with birdie on first extra hole |

=== Asia Golf Circuit wins (1) ===
| No. | Date | Tournament | Winning score | Margin of victory | Runner-up |
|---|---|---|---|---|---|
| 1 | 18 Apr 1976 | Korea Open | −2 (71-73-70=214) | Playoff | (Myanmar) Mya Aye |

Asia Golf Circuit playoff record (1–0)

| No. | Year | Tournament | Opponent | Result |
|---|---|---|---|---|
| 1 | 1976 | Korea Open | (Myanmar) Mya Aye | Won with par on sixth extra hole |

=== Other wins (4) ===
- 1979 Gunma Open
- 1986 Ibaraki Open
- 1987 Kuzuha International, Setonaikai Open

=== Japan Senior PGA Tour wins (13) ===
- 2000 (2) Japan PGA Senior Championship, Japan Senior Open
- 2001 (2) Komatsu Open, FANCL Senior Classic
- 2002 (1) FANCL Senior Classic
- 2003 (3) FANCL Senior Classic, PGA Philanthropy Big Rizak Senior Tournament, Japan Senior Open
- 2004 (2) Castle Hill Open, Japan Senior Open
- 2005 (1) PGA Philanthropy Rebornest Senior Open
- 2007 (1) Aderans Wellness Open
- 2017 (1) Trust Group Cup Sasebo Senior Open

=== Other senior wins (2) ===
- 2004 MK Charity Senior Open
- 2017 Kansai Pro Golf Grand Senior Championship

== Team appearances ==
- World Cup (representing Japan): 1987
- Four Tours World Championship (representing Japan): 1989

== See also ==
- List of golfers with most Japan Golf Tour wins
